= Magical Treatise of Solomon =

Grimoire influential on the Key of Solomon

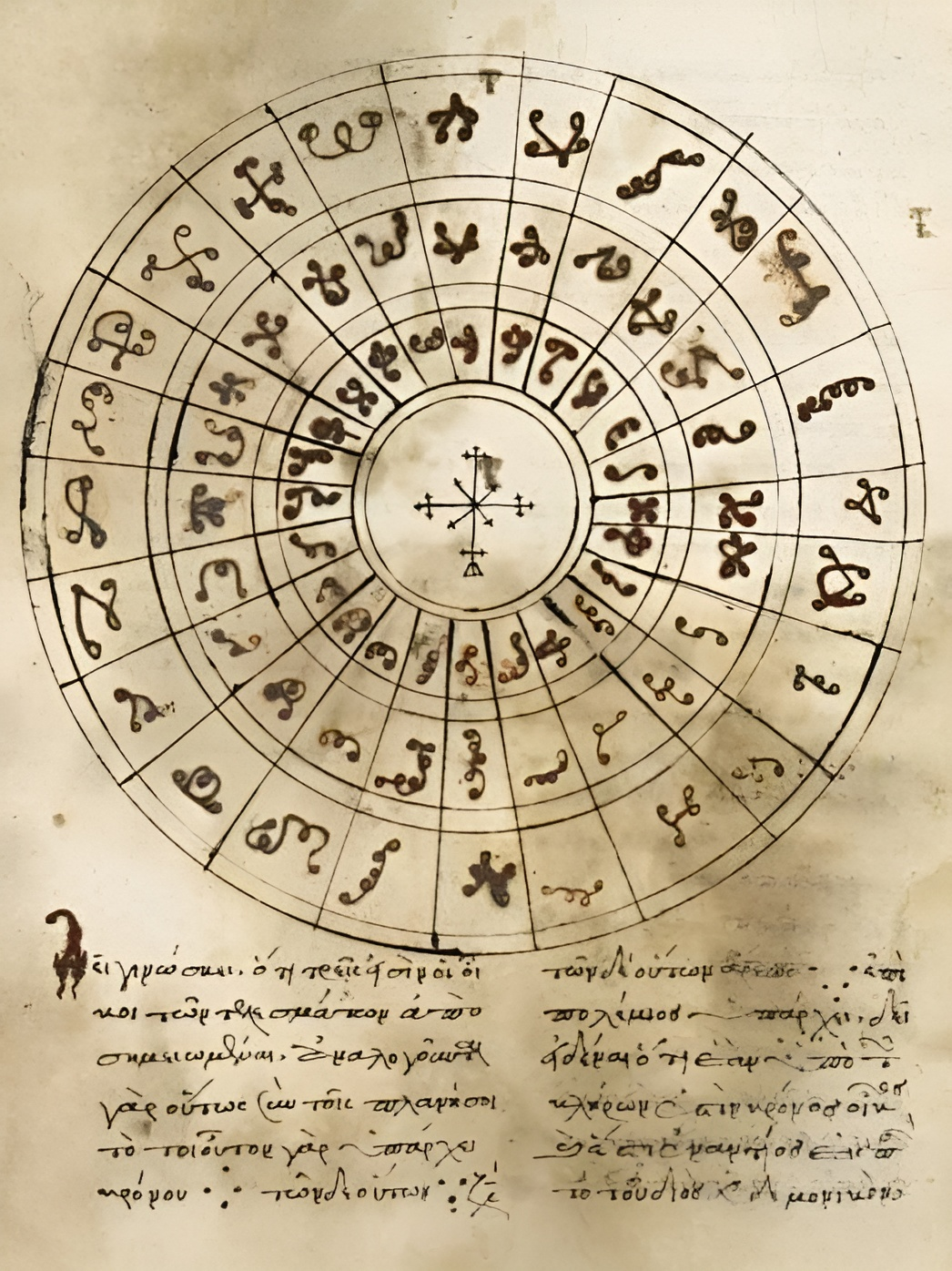
- 15th century Greek manuscript, now at the British Library, London
- Author: Unknown
- Language: Medieval Greek
- Genre: Grimoire

The Magical Treatise of Solomon, also known as the Hygromanteia (Greek: Ὑγρομαντεία) (Note: Greek pronunciation: [iɣromanˈdia], lit. 'liquid divination'; anglicized as the Hygromancy of Solomon.) or Solomonikê (Greek: Σολομωνική), (Note: Greek pronunciation: [solomoniˈki]; Sometimes also found as the Little Key of the Whole Art of Hygromancy, Found by Several Craftsmen and by the Holy Prophet Solomon.) is a collection of late Byzantine grimoires. A pseudepigraphon, the book was written in medieval Greek and purports to contain Solomon's instructions to his son Rehoboam on various magical techniques and tools. It includes guides on how to summon and control spirits and their powers, instructions on the selection of charms and the magical uses of herbs, as well as different means of divination and astrological beliefs. The Magical Treatise survives in fragments from a number of manuscripts dating from the 15th century CE. The book has been important for the history of European magic, serving as a link between the earlier Greek magical practices and the later grimoires of Western Europe. During the early modern period, the book began to be translated in Latin, becoming the source for future European grimoires, most notably the Key of Solomon.

== History ==
=== Composition ===
The oldest preserved manuscripts of the Magical Treatise date from the 14th century, and the majority from the 15th century CE. Torijano (2002) asserts that the text originates from the early Byzantine period and it might have been composed in Italy, as the Greek text appears to be particularly well-composed and it shows some Italian influence. He further suggests that, due to the lack of obvious signs of Christianization in the text, the work preserves much older material that could go as far back as the early centuries of the common era; a theory that is either accepted or at least regarded as plausible. Marathakis (2011) writes that if, according to Torijano, the text was first composed in Italy, it would have been some time between the 6th and 11th centuries, when parts of Italy were under Byzantine rule. Nevertheless, Marathakis finds it more probable that the work was in fact composed in Venetian-ruled Crete some time between the 13th or 14th centuries. McCown argued that the book was known to Byzantine scholars prior to the 13th century based on Niketas Choniates' reference of a certain "Solomonic book", which allowed sorcerers to summon demons in legions. Marathakis notes that, except for the Magical Treatise, this description also fits the earlier Testament of Solomon, which could be the book that Choniates was referring to instead.

=== Influence ===
The Magical Treatise of Solomon served as a bridge connecting the magical practices of late antiquity and the Middle Ages with the later European grimoires of the Renaissance, the most widely known being the Key of Solomon. Early copies of the Magical Treatise were appended to or incorporated elements of the Roman-era Testament of Solomon. Portions of the Treatise also select ideas which may bear distant relationships to the Book of Abramelin, the Greek Magical Papyri (particularly the "Sword of Dardanus"), Sefer Raziel HaMalakh, Sepher Ha-Razim, the Sword of Moses, and the Cyranides.

The Magical Treatise itself has been an important source of material for the Key of Solomon, from which a number of European grimoires later derived. The introduction of the Magical Treatise in the Italian peninsula likely occurred after the sack of Constantinople by the Ottomans, which caused a wave of scholars to migrate to Italy, bringing with them a large number of Greek manuscripts for safety. Among those manuscripts, their Hygromanteia would almost certainly be included. As a result of the close affinity between the two works, the Greek Magical Treatise is sometimes regarded as the earliest copy of the Key of Solomon before its translation into Latin in the 16th century. Similarly, one of the earliest manuscripts of the Key of Solomon is also classified as a late copy of the Magical Treatise. Some manuscripts of the Treatise featured demons assigned to the four cardinal directions, distinct from those found in the Lesser Key of Solomon and related works, but very similar to those found in later works such as the Grand Grimoire and Grimoirium Verum. Portions of the Treatise also have some relationship to the Heptameron of Pietro d'Abano, the Lesser Key of Solomon, and the Sworn Book of Honorius.

== Contents ==
The Magical Treatise provides instructions on how to create planetary, daily, and hourly talismans, a magic sword, vessels for divination and conjuration, wax figures, scrolls (written in the blood of a bat), a ring, special clothing, and a garland, all intended to control summoned spirits. Angelic conjurations, general prayers to God, and prayers to control planetary influences are listed. Astrological beliefs, including supposed relationship between planets and select plants, are presented as esoteric knowledge. Different angels and demons over different planets, days, and hours are named, as well as what function they perform, although the lists are mostly unique to each manuscript. Angels mentioned include Michael, Gabriel, Uriel, Raphael, and Anael. Demons mentioned include Asmodeus, Abizouth, Oniskeliá, Lucifer (as Loutzipher), Astaroth, and Beelzebub.

== Editions ==
- The Magical Treatise of Solomon, or Hygromanteia; Trans. & Ed. Ioannis Marathakis, Fore. Stephen Skinner; Golden Hoard Press, 2011.
- Translation of select manuscripts in Solomon, the Esoteric King: From King to Magus, Development of a Tradition (pp. 231–309); by Pablo A. Torijano, Brill, Jan 2002. Also featured in pp. 311–325 of Old Testament Pseudepigrapha: More Noncanonical Scriptures, Volume 1; ed.s Richard Bauckham, James R. Davila, Alexander Panayotov; Wm. B. Eerdmans Publishing, 2013.
- Transcription of one manuscript in Anecdota Atheniensia (pp. 397–445), by Armand Delatte; Liége, 1927. Noted to be the most well known available on archive.org

== Sources ==
- Davies, Owen (2010). Grimoires, A History of Magic Books. Oxford University Press. ISBN 9780199590049.
- Rankine, David (2012). "From Roots to Fruits – A History of the Grimoire Tradition". In Lycourinos, Damon Zacharias (ed.). Occult traditions. ISBN 978-0987158130.
- Marathakis, Ioannis; Skinner, Stephen (2011). The Magical Treatise of Solomon, Or Hygromanteia. Golden Hoard Press. ISBN 978-0-7387-3140-7.
- Marathakis, Ioannis (2012). "A Source of The Key of Solomon - The Magic Treatise or Hygromacy, or Epistle to Rehoboam". In Lycourinos, Damon Zacharias (ed.). Occult Traditions. ISBN 978-0987158130.
- Torijano, Pablo (2021) [2002]. Solomon the Esoteric King: From King to Magus, Development of a Tradition. BRILL. ISBN 978-90-04-49449-7.
- Torijano, Pablo (2013). "The Hygromancy of Solomon". In Bauckham, Richard; Davila, James; Panayotov, Alex (eds.). Old Testament Pseudepigrapha: More Noncanonical Scriptures. Wm. B. Eerdmans Publishing. ISBN 978-0802827395.
