= Book of Saint Cyprian =

Group of 17th, 18th, and 19th century grimoires

Cyprian of Antioch (and Justina)

Book of Saint Cyprian (Portuguese: Livro de São Cipriano; Spanish: Libro de San Cipriano) is a name for various grimoires of the 17th, 18th, and 19th centuries, all pseudepigrapha attributed to the 3rd-century Saint Cyprian of Antioch (not to be confused with Cyprian of Carthage). According to popular legend, Cyprian of Antioch was a pagan sorcerer who converted to Christianity.

== The Iberian Cyprian ==
The Iberian Cyprian is not a single text but multiple texts in Spanish and Portuguese, mostly from the 19th century. There was, however, a now lost pre-modern Cyprianic literature with no apparent connection to any extant works beyond being inspired by the Cyprianic legend.

=== The Portuguese Cyprian ===
The Portuguese version of the Book of Cyprian often bears prefixes such as "Great and True," "Only Complete," or "Authentic," and typically subtitled "The Sorcerer's Treasure" (ou thesouro de feiticeiro). The content is apparently Catholic, though deeply rooted in Bruxaria, and it is popular (particularly in Brazil) among practitioners of Quimbanda, Umbanda, and Candomblé. The Sorcerer's Treasure contains very little evocation, instead drawing upon oral traditions relating to divination, healing spells, prayers (including some to one's guardian angel), exorcisms, love magic, the locations of buried treasures throughout Galicia, and sometimes even treatises on animal magnetism -- all set within a framework of folk Catholicism. Most editions start off with the legend of St Cyprian and commonly contain sections on alchemy, astrology, cartomancy, conjuring devils, divination, exorcisms, ghosts, hidden treasures, love magic, luck magic, omens, oneiromancy, palmistry, and prayers. Some editions also contain the success stories of a French peasant named Victor Siderol, who purportedly discovered hidden treasures thanks to the book. The Brazilian forms of the Sorcerer's Treasure vary drastically, though the Portuguese editions are rather stable (at least in comparison).

The most representative edition is the Livraria Económica edition, which was translated into English as The Book of St. Cyprian - The Sorcerer's Treasure by José Leitão with further additions from more recent editions (such as the Moderna Editorial Lavores).

According to Leitão, Portuguese Cyprianic literature represents a combination of Iberian magical beliefs and traditional African religion. The Portuguese Inquisition's focus on Crypto-Judaism (instead of witchcraft) made it easier for magical practitioners to Christianize traditional Iberian magical and imported African religious beliefs. The Inquisition unintentionally aided this by treating traditional African religious practices and beliefs as deviant forms of Catholicism rather than as something outside the religion. Many of these practices were to have later influenced Portuguese Cyprianic literature. Leitão further claims that Portuguese Cyprianic literature developed in three phases:

- the development of diverse oral traditions concerning St Cyprian.
- the collection of the oral traditions into a "standard" Book of Cyprian, which in turn gave rise to further oral traditions about the book itself.
- the standardized book being rearranged, expanded, and redacted with the advent of the printing press and South American syncretism.

=== The Spanish Cyprian ===
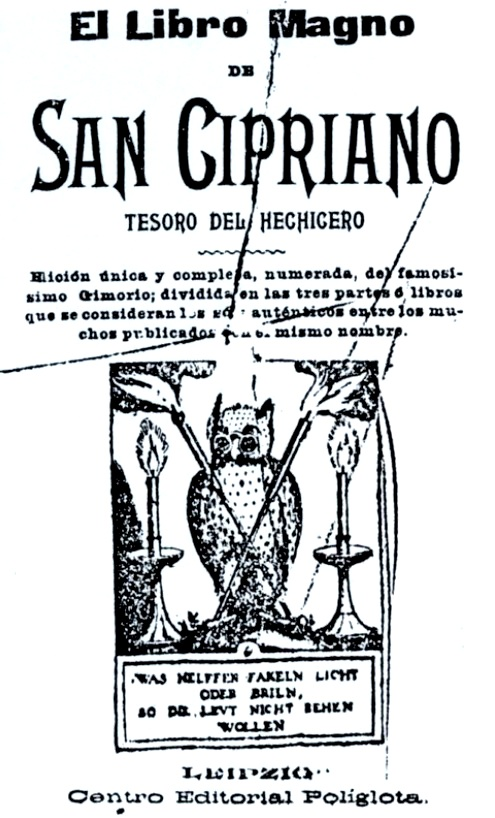
The title page of a Spanish edition

Most Spanish version claim to have been written by a Jonas Sulfurino ("Sulphury Jonas"), are similar (though distinct from) the Key of Solomon, and are typically a rehash of the Grand Grimoire. The most complete and popular version, titled Libro Infernal, combines elements of the Grand Grimoire, the Key of Solomon, and the Grand et Petit Albert. The Libro Infernal was also translated to Italian in 1920 by its original publisher.

The oldest extant Cyprianic work dates to 1810 and claims to have been translated from Latin. It is titled "Heptameron or Magical Elements," but despite this title bears little resemblance to the purported grimoire by Pietro d'Abano or any other European spell book. Later, an edition of the Grand Grimoire was appended to a book on the Galician Inquisition, claimed to be "the Ciprianillo." Following this was another edition of the Grand Grimoire which added the supposed copyist-monk Jonás Sufurino to the legend. Later editions added material on animal magnetism, cartomancy, hypnotism, Spiritualism, and The Black Pullet.

== The Scandinavian Cyprian ==
The Scandinavian Cyprianus svarteboken (black books) are a distinct tradition with no connection beyond the shared story of St Cyprian. One of these, the Black Books of Elvarum, dates back to 1682 and claims to go back to 1529.

== The Wellcome Cyprian ==
A Latin manuscript (Wellcome MS 2000) attributed to "M: L: Cypriani" (or "Magistri Ludi Cypriani," 'teacher Cypriani') entitled Clavis Inferni sive magia alba et nigra approbata Metratona ('The Key of Hell with white and black magic proven by Metatron') was discovered by Stephen Skinner and David Rankine in 2004. It dates to either 1717 or 1757, though internal evidence suggests 1857 as another possible date.

It is unrelated to Iberian or Scandinavian Cyprianic literature (beyond its patron saint), but is definitely related to pseudo-d'Abano's Heptameron, Heinrich Cornelius Agrippa, the Sixth and Seventh Books of Moses, contemporary Faustbuchen from Das Kloster, Liber Lunae, Trithemius's Polygraphie, and the Magical Calendar

== Bibliography ==
- Castro, Félix Francisco (2010). Harms, Dan (ed.). "The Books of Saint Cyprian". Papers Falling from an Attic Window.
- Leitão, José (2014). The Book of St. Cyprian - The Sorcerer's Treasure. Hadean press. ISBN 9781907881329.
- Skinner, Stephen; Rankine, David (2010). The Grimoire of Saint Cyprian - Clavis Inferni. Llewellyn Worldwide Limited. ISBN 9780738723488.
