= Pentacle =

Magical talisman

Pentagram, a common symbol on a pentacle

Hexagram, a common symbol on the six-point version of a pentacle

A pentacle (also spelled and pronounced as pantacle in Thelema, following Aleister Crowley, though that spelling ultimately derived from Éliphas Lévi) is a talisman that is used in magical evocation, and is usually made of parchment, paper, cloth, or metal (although it can be of other materials), upon which a magical design is drawn. Symbols may also be included (sometimes on the reverse), a common one being the six-point form of the Seal of Solomon.

Pentacles may be sewn to the chest of one's garment, or may be flat objects that hang from one's neck or are placed flat upon the ground or altar. Pentacles are almost always shaped as disks or flat circles. In the Hermetic Order of the Golden Dawn, though, a pentacle is placed within the triangle of evocation.

Many varieties of pentacle can be found in the grimoire called the Key of Solomon. Pentacles are also used in Wicca, alongside other magical tools. In the Hermetic Order of the Golden Dawn and Wicca, pentacles symbolize the classical element earth. In the 1909 Rider–Waite–Smith tarot deck (the pentacles of which were designed by Arthur Edward Waite), and subsequent tarot decks that are based upon it, and in Wicca, pentacles prominently incorporate a pentagram in their design. This form of pentacle is formed upon a disk which may be used either upon an altar or as a sacred space of its own.

== Definitions ==
The first documents to depict pentacles were the 16th-century grimoires called the Heptameron by pseudo-Pietro d'Abano, and the Key of Solomon. In the Heptaméron, there is only one pentacle, whereas in the Key of Solomon, there are dozens of different pentacles. The Heptameron's pentacle is a hexagram that is embellished by patee crosses and letters, whereas the Key of Solomon's pentacles have a very broad variety of designs, only two of which are pentagrammic. That contrasts with the later popular definitions of pentacles from the 1900s, which state that pentacles are inherently pentagrammic.

Gerald Gardner, known by some as the 'Father of Wicca', got his concept of pentacles in large part from the 1909 Rider–Waite–Smith tarot deck, in which the pentacles are disks that are covered with a pentagram. In Gardner's 1949 book High Magic's Aid and 1954 book Witchcraft Today, Gardner defined a pentacle as a "five-pointed star", intending to mean a pentagram. In his 1959 book The Meaning of Witchcraft, Gardner defined a pentacle as a synonym of 'pentagram'.

There is a particular definition of 'pentacle' among many latter-day Wiccans: Namely, a 'pentacle' refers to a 'pentagram' circumscribed by a circle.

== Etymology ==
The word is first recorded in English usage in 1561, from earlier French use. The French word had the meaning of "talisman". The French word is in turn from the Latinized word 'pentaculum' (using the Latin diminutive suffix -culum), which is in turn from the Italian word 'pentacolo'.

The Oxford English Dictionary in earlier editions (2nd edition 1989) went on to say that "some would connect it" with the Middle French word 'pentacol' (1328) or 'pendacol' (1418), a jewel or ornament worn around the neck (from pend- hang, à to, col or cou neck). This is the derivation the Theosophical Society employ in their glossary:

...it seems most likely that it comes through Italian and French from the root pend- "to hang", and so is equivalent to a pendant or charm hung about the neck. From the fact that one form of pentacle was the pentagram or star-pentagon, the word itself has been connected with the Greek pente (five).

== As magical objects ==
Pentacles, despite the sound of the word, often had no connotation of "five" in the old magical texts, but were, rather, magical talismans inscribed with any symbol or character. When they incorporated star-shaped figures, these were more often hexagrams than pentagrams. Pentacles showing a great variety of shapes and images appear in the old magical grimoires, such as the Key of Solomon; as Heinrich Cornelius Agrippa summarises it, their use was to "fore-know all future things, & command whole nature, have power over devils, and Angels, and do miracles." Agrippa attributes Moses' feats of magic in part to his knowledge of various pentacles.

A Fourth Book of Occult Philosophy (c. 1565), which was falsely attributed to Agrippa, gives detailed instructions as to how pentacles should be formulated:

But we now come to speak of the holy and sacred Pentacles and Sigils. Now these pentacles, are as it were certain holy signes preserving us from evil chances and events, and helping and assisting us to binde, exterminate, and drive away evil spirits, and alluring the good spirits, and reconciling them unto us. And these pentacles do consist either of Characters of the good spirits of the superiour order, or of sacred pictures of holy letters or revelations, with apt and fit versicles, which are composed either of Geometrical figures and holy names of God, according to the course and maner of many of them; or they are compounded of all of them, or very many of them mixt.

Francis Barrett, in his influential work The Magus of 1801 (Book 2, part 2), repeats these instructions almost verbatim.

Another common design employed in pentacles is a magic square, such as the Sator-Arepo-Tenet square.

In the Golden Dawn magical system, the Earth Pentacle is one of four elemental "weapons" or tools of an Adept. These weapons are "symbolical representations of the forces employed for the manifestation of the inner self, the elements required for the incarnation of the divine."

Other pentacles for the evocation of spirits are also employed in the Golden Dawn system; these are engraved with the name and sigil of the spirit to be invoked, inside three concentric circles, having painted on their reverse a circle and cross like a celtic cross.

According to Aleister Crowley's instructions for the A∴A∴, the pentacle is a disc of wax, gold, silver-gilt or Electrum Magicum, eight inches diameter and half an inch thick; the Neophyte should "by his understanding and ingenium devise a symbol to represent the Universe", and engrave this on the disc.

There is, therefore, nothing movable or immovable under the whole firmament of heaven which is not included in this pantacle, though it be but "eight inches in diameter, and in thickness half an inch." Fire is not matter at all; water is a combination of elements; air almost entirely a mixture of elements; earth contains all both in admixture and in combination. So must it be with this Pantacle, the symbol of earth.

A pentacle is also employed as a magical tool within Wicca, generally to summon certain energies or summon spirits.

=== Method of employment ===
In many old grimoires dealing with magical evocation, the pentacle is described as being hung about the neck, providing protection and authority to the operator. Johannes Trithemius has the magician donning the pentacle just before casting the protective circle:

Then taking your ring and pentacle, put the ring on the little finger of your right hand; hang the pentacle round thy neck; (Note, the pentacle may be either wrote on clean virgin parchment, or engraven on a square plate of silver and suspended from thy neck to the breast)....

One version of the Key of Solomon mentions both a "Great Pentacle" which is drawn in a book, as well as a collection of other pentacles which are drawn in ink on separate pieces of parchment for use as amulets:

Thou shalt preserve them to suspend from thy neck, whichever thou wilt, on the day and hour wherein thou wast born, after which thou shalt take heed to name every day ten times, the Name which is hung from thy neck, turning towards the East, and thou mayest be assured that no enchantment or any other danger shall have power to harm thee.

The pentacle is of central importance in the evocation of spirits. A fairly typical evocation involves a series of conjurations of increasing potency, each involving the display of the pentacle:

... If they then immediately appear, it is well; if not, let the master uncover the consecrated pentacles which he should have made to constrain and command the spirits, and which he should wear fastened round his neck, holding the medals (or pentacles) in his left hand, and the consecrated knife in his right; and encouraging his companions, he shall say with a loud voice:

Here be the symbols of secret things, the standards, the ensigns, and the banners, of God the conqueror; and the arms of the almighty One, to compel the aerial potencies. I command ye absolutely by their power and virtue that ye come near unto us, into our presence, from whatsoever part of the world ye may be in, and that ye delay not to obey us in all things wherein we shall command ye by the virtue of God the mighty One. Come ye promptly, and delay not to appear, and answer us with humility.

If they appear at this time, show them the pentacles, and receive them with kindness, gentleness, and courtesy; reason and speak with them, question them, and ask from them all things which thou hast proposed to demand.

But if, on the contrary, they do not yet make their appearance, holding the consecrated knife in the right hand, and the pentacles being uncovered by the removal of their consecrated covering, strike and beat the air with the knife as if wishing to commence a combat, comfort and exhort thy companions, and then in a loud and stern voice repeat the following conjuration: ...

Once the spirit has appeared and been constrained, the pentacle is covered again, but is uncovered whenever demands are made of the spirit or when it is compelled to depart.

In the Golden Dawn system, the pentacles are not suspended from the neck, but wrapped in a cloth covering. Instead of wearing a pentacle, the magician wears fastened to their breast a lamen.

=== Gallery ===
The "Pentacle of Solomon" from the 17th century grimoire Lesser Key of Solomon. Its purpose is to constrain spirits during magical evocation.

The Second Pentacle of Jupiter, from the Key of Solomon (Clavicula Salomonis). This was found on the body of Anselm, Bishop of Würzburg, on the night of his death in 1749. He was rumored to be an alchemist.

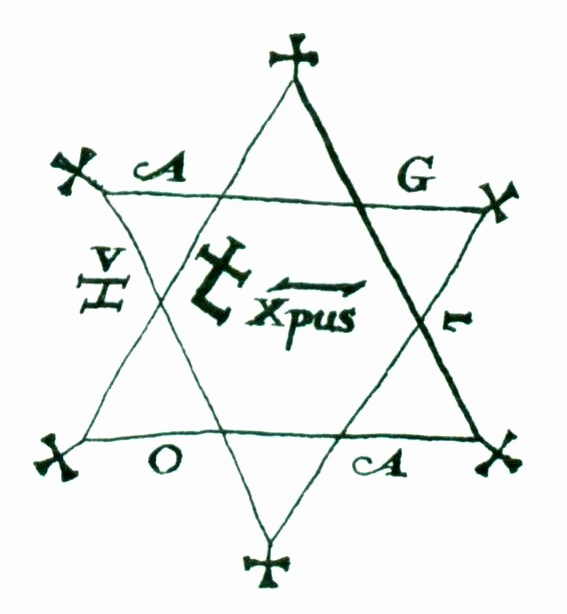
The pentacle in the 1500s grimoire Heptaméron. It is to be drawn on kid-skin parchment on the day and in the hour of Mercury, the Moon increasing.

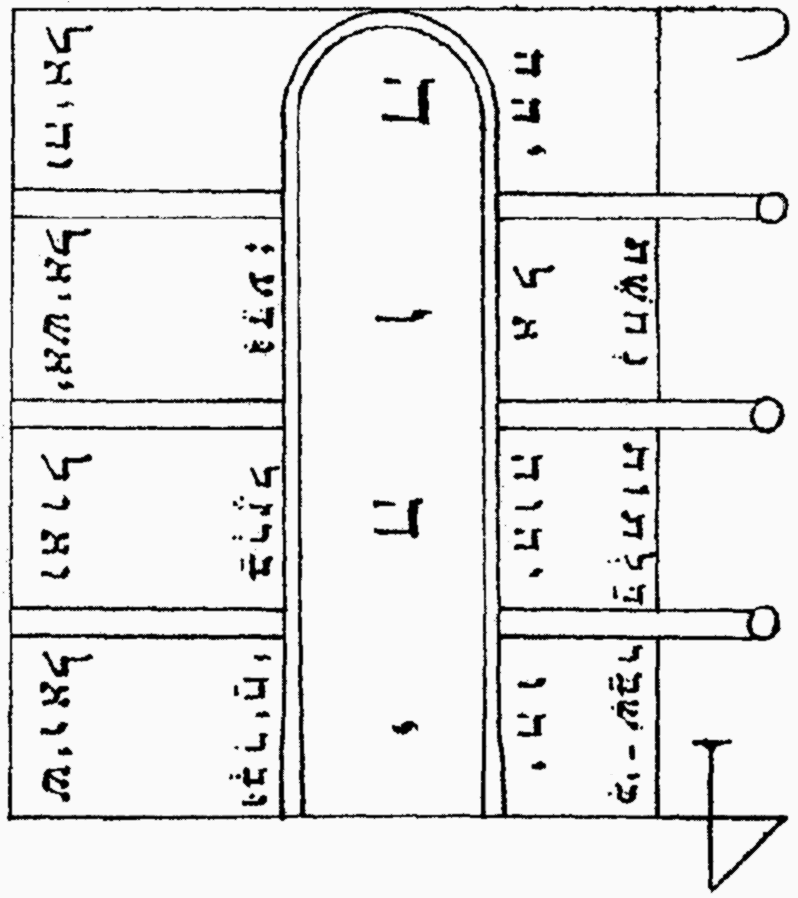
The "First Pentacle of the Moon" from the Key of Solomon. It serves "to call forth and invoke the spirits of the moon, and further serveth to open doors, in whatever way they may be fastened." It is to be drawn in silver or grey.

The Earth Pentacle in the Golden Dawn system of magic, one of the elemental "weapons" or tools of an adept.

USVA Headstone Emblem 37.

== In tarot ==
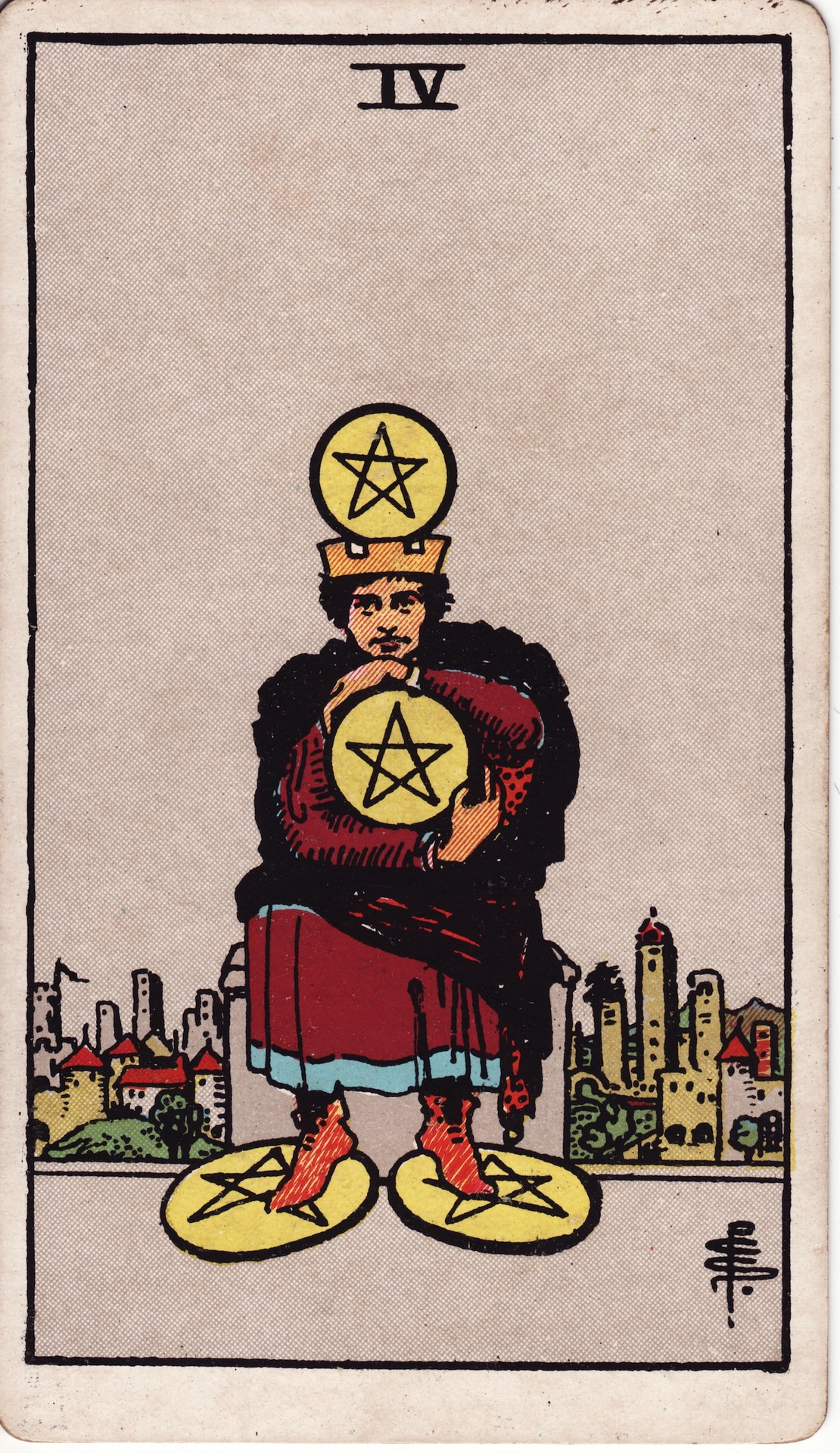
The traditional suit of coins became "pentacles" in the 1909 Rider–Waite tarot deck, designed by Golden Dawn initiates A. E. Waite and Pamela Colman Smith.

Much like conventional playing cards, the Minor Arcana of the tarot are divided into four suits. The suit names have evolved over time, and based on the innovation of Éliphas Lévi, contemporary English-language writers on tarot divination often prefer "pentacles" for the suit of coins.

The 1909 Rider–Waite–Smith tarot deck was the first to use an actual suit of pentacles, where Arthur Edward Waite designed the pentacles as golden disks with a pentagram on them. The influence of that deck resulted in widespread use of the pentacle symbol, particularly among Wiccans.

== In mathematics ==
The term pentacle is used in Tilings and patterns by Branko Grünbaum and G. C. Shephard to indicate a five-pointed star composed of ten line segments, similar to a pentagram but containing no interior lines.

== See also ==
- Wuxing, the five phase cycle in Chinese philosophy.
