= Black Pullet =

French grimoire

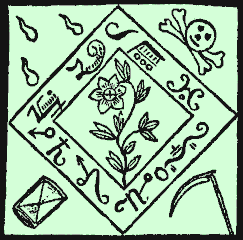
This design for an amulet comes from the Black Pullet grimoire. Embroider it upon black satin, and say "Nades, Suradis, Maniner", and a djinn is supposed to appear; tell the djinn "Sader, Prostas, Solaster", and the djinn will bring you your true love. Say "Mammes, Laher" when you tire of her.

The Black Pullet (original French: La poule noire) also known in French as "la poule aux œufs d'or" (the hen that lays golden eggs) is a grimoire that proposes to teach the "science of magical talismans and rings", including the art of necromancy and Kabbalah. It is believed to have been written in the 18th century by an anonymous French officer who served in Napoleon's Grande Armée. The text takes the form of a narrative centering on the French officer during the Egyptian expedition led by Napoleon when his unit is suddenly attacked by Bedouins. The French officer manages to escape the attack, but is the only survivor. An old Turkish man appears suddenly from the pyramids and takes the French officer into a secret apartment within one of the pyramids. He nurses him back to health whilst sharing with him the magical teachings from ancient manuscripts that escaped the "burning of Ptolemy's library".

The book contains instructions on creating magical properties such as talismanic rings and amulets and how to master their extraordinary powers. Perhaps the most fascinating magical property claimed in the book is the Black Pullet, otherwise known as the Hen that lays Golden Eggs. The grimoire claims that the person who understands and attains the power to instruct the Black Pullet will gain unlimited wealth. The notion of such a lucrative possession has been reflected throughout history in fables, fairy tales and folklore.

This text has often been associated with two other texts, the Red Dragon (or The Grand Grimoire) and the Black Screech Owl. The latter is also confusingly known as The Black Pullet or Treasure of the Old Man of the Pyramids. It is, in fact, an alternate printing of the original Black Pullet with only slight changes. All three grimoires claim to possess the science of ancient magic.

== See also ==
- The Book of Abramelin
- The Sworn Book of Honorius
- Key of Solomon
- Grand Grimoire
- Christian Kabbalah
