= The True Black Magic =

Pseudepigraphical grimoire (book of spells)

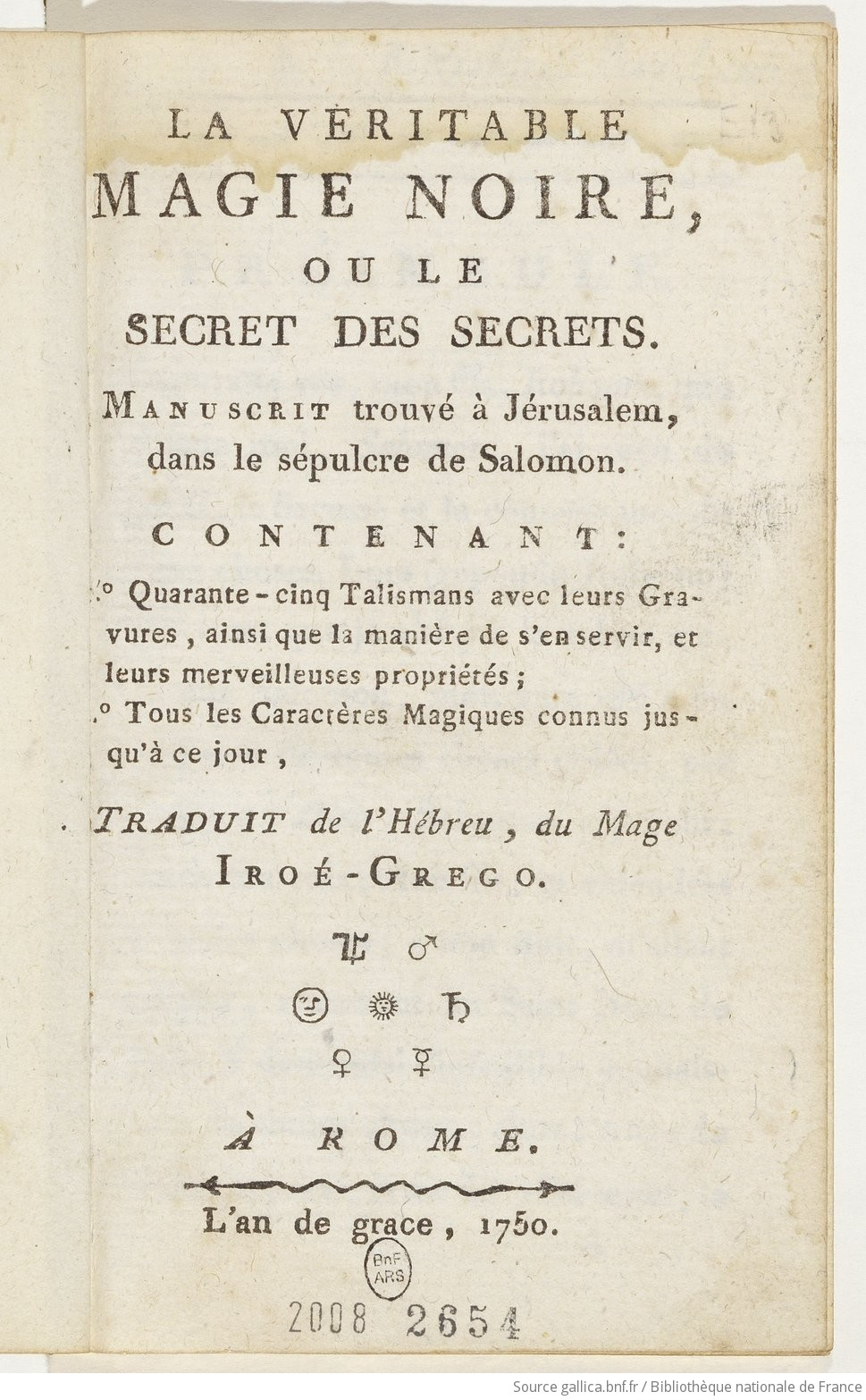
Title page of the grimoire The True Black Magic (La véritable magie noire).

The True Black Magic (French: La véritable magie noire), also known as The secret of secrets, is a pseudepigraphical grimoire or book of spells attributed to King Solomon. It probably dates back to the 14th or 15th century.

== Editions ==
Only two known copies of the text exist, both dated 1750 but printed in ca. 1790 and 1830. One of the editions is held in the Bibliothèque nationale de France, while the other is in private hands. Both editions are supposedly French translations by Iroé Grego from original manuscripts in Hebrew.

The edition held in the Bibliothèque nationale de France has been analyzed by A. E. Waite in The Book of Ceremonial Magic.

== Content ==
The grimoire is divided in two books. The first one contains instructions the magician has to follow to prepare for the magical rituals, and several spells to achieve supernatural powers. The second book is dedicated to 45 pentacles that also allow the user to obtain treasures, powers, and control over spirits and demons.
