= Grimoire of Pope Leo =

Pseudepigraphical book of magic

The Grimoire of Pope Leo or Enchiridion of Pope Leo is a French grimoire (a textbook of magic) that is pseudepigraphically attributed to Pope Leo III. The book claims to have been published in 1523, but the earliest known version of the text is from 1633. It was listed in police records in association with the Affair of the Poisons, and a copy was owned by Marc Antoine René de Voyer.

This grimoire, along with other Bibliothèque bleue grimoires such as the Grimoire of Pope Honorius and Petit Albert, were brought to the French Caribbean colonies, becoming the foundation of that region's literary magical tradition.

== Bibliography ==
- Davies, Owen (2009). Grimoires: A History of Magic Books. Oxford University Press USA. ISBN 9780199204519. OCLC 244766270.
