= Clavicula =

Clavicula may refer to:

- Clavicle, a slender, S-shaped long bone approximately 6 inches that serves as a strut between the shoulder blade and the sternum
- Mappae clavicula, a medieval Latin text containing manufacturing recipes for crafts materials
- Clavicula Salomonis (disambiguation)

== See also ==
- Clavis (disambiguation)
