= Clauneck =

Goetic daemon

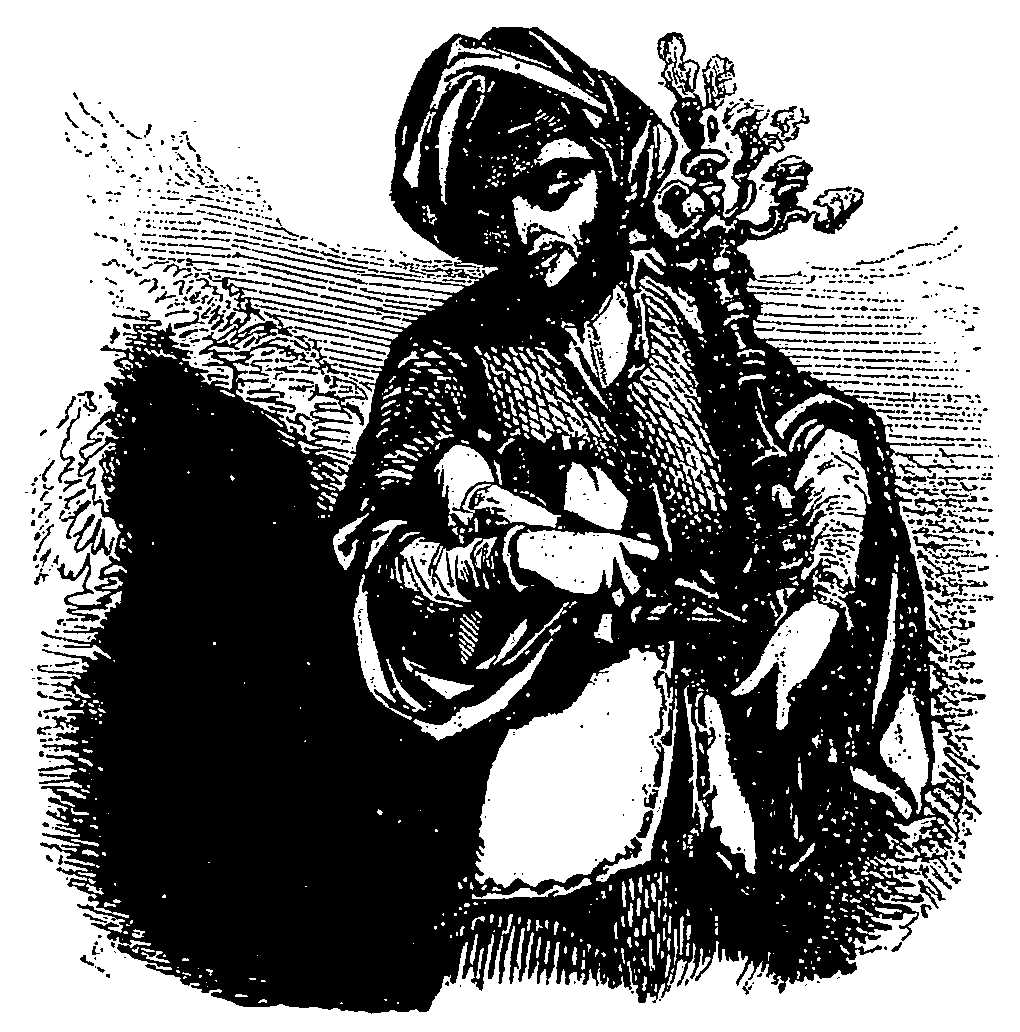
Clauneck, an illustration from the "Dictionnaire Infernal" by French occultist Jacques Collin de Plancy.

Clauneck (also called Chaunta, Elantiel, Claunt and Claunth) is a daemon appearing in the grimoires Key of Solomon, Grimorium Verum and Dictionnaire Infernal.

In Key of Solomon, the earliest known text in which he appears (18th century), his name is rendered as "Claunth", and he is said to be able "to give wealth, and to take it away". The book goes on to describe a ritual by which one invokes him alongside Lucifer to magically transform slips of parchment into gold coins.

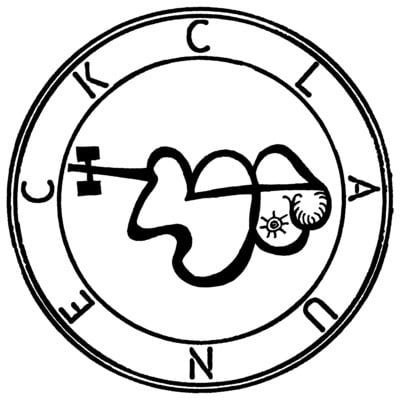
Seal of Clauneck

Clauneck makes his most famous appearance in the Grimorium Verum, known from French and Italian copies dating from the 19th century. He's one of the eighteen Servitors of Syrach, and is said to be well loved by Lucifer; he is, usually, summoned for his ability to bestow wealth, either by bringing money over a great distance or by assisting in the discovery of hidden treasures. Clauneck is the demon of wealth, known to be obedient to his summoners, but only to those who show him the proper respect.

== Modern Interpretations ==
- Clauneck appears in the video game Cult of the Lamb in the form of a duck, providing the protagonist with upgrades.
- The 2020 concept album Indwell by solo deathcore project Methwitch tells the story of a man summoning Clauneck, but accidentally instead opening a portal for demons who then slowly torture him to death.
- In contemporary occult practices, Clauneck is sometimes invoked in chaos magic or ceremonial magic for goals related to abundance, prosperity, and financial stability. Modern practitioners may view him as an archetype or symbolic representation of these forces rather than a literal being.
