= Cyprian and Justina =

Pair of Christians martyred in 304

Saints Cyprian and Justina
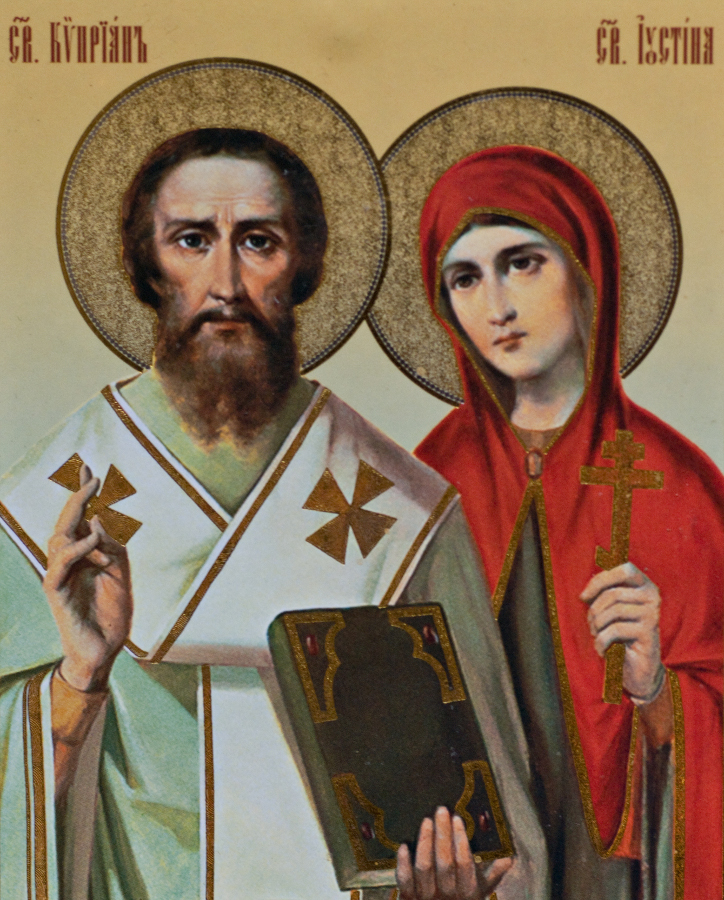
- Cyprian and Justina, icon from Ukraine

Martyrs
- Born: 3rd century AD
- Died: September 26, 304; Nicomedia, Bithynia, Asia Minor, Roman Empire (modern-day İzmit, Kocaeli, Turkey)
- Venerated in: Oriental Orthodoxy; Eastern Orthodox Church; Roman Catholic Church
- Feast: September 26, October 2 (Eastern Orthodox Church), 21 Thout (Coptic Orthodox Church)

Saints Cyprian and Justina (Greek: Κυπριανός & Ίουστίνη) are honored in the Catholic Church, Eastern Orthodox Church and Oriental Orthodoxy as Christians of Antioch, who in 304, during the Diocletianic Persecution, suffered martyrdom at Nicomedia (modern-day İzmit, Turkey) on September 26. According to Roman Catholic sources, no Bishop of Antioch bore the name of Cyprian.

The historian of religion Gilles Quispel has argued that the story of Cyprian is a prototype of the Faust story.

== Origin ==
The story must have arisen as early as the 4th century, as it is mentioned by both St. Gregory Nazianzen and Prudentius; both, nevertheless, have conflated Cyprian with St. Cyprian of Carthage, a mistake often repeated. The legend is given in Greek and Latin in Acta SS. September, VII. Ancient Syriac and Ethiopic versions of it have been published. Their story is told in the Golden Legend.

The outline of the legend or allegory is found with diffuse descriptions and dialogues in the unreliable Symeon Metaphrastes and was made the subject of a poem by Empress Aelia Eudocia.

== Legend ==
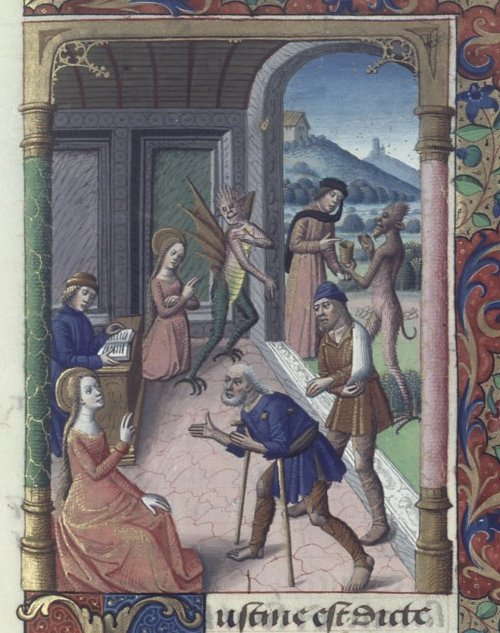
Saint Cyprian and the demon, 14th-century manuscript of the Golden Legend.

Cyprian, named Hieromatyr, and known by the title of "the Magician" (to distinguish him from Cyprian, Bishop of Carthage), received a liberal education in his youth, and particularly applied himself to astrology; after which he traveled for improvement through Greece, Egypt, India, etc. Cyprian was a magician in Antioch and dealt in sorcery.

Justina is known for converting Cyprian, and is said to have been a young woman who took private vows of chastity. She was killed during the persecutions of the Roman emperor Diocletian in AD 304.

A would-be suitor – a pagan lawyer – sought the aid of Cyprian's magic to induce Justina into marrying him. Cyprian sent a demon to torment Justina, hoping to arouse carnal passions within her. The charms and spells had no effect on Justina, who, in chastity and purity, spent her time in prayer and fasting. Cyprian again employed sorcery, sending "the chief of the demons" to Justina, who likewise was conquered by a certain "Sign of Christ". Brought to despair, Cyprian made the Sign himself and in this way was freed from the toils of Satan. Cyprian summarily burned any books of spells and sorcery in his possession in front of a bishop of the Church, sealing his commitment to a new life as a Christian. He was baptized and received into the Church and was made preeminent by miraculous gifts. Cyprian then became, in succession, a deacon, priest, and finally, bishop after being named as the successor to Anthimus, bishop of Antioch, while Justina became abbess of a convent.

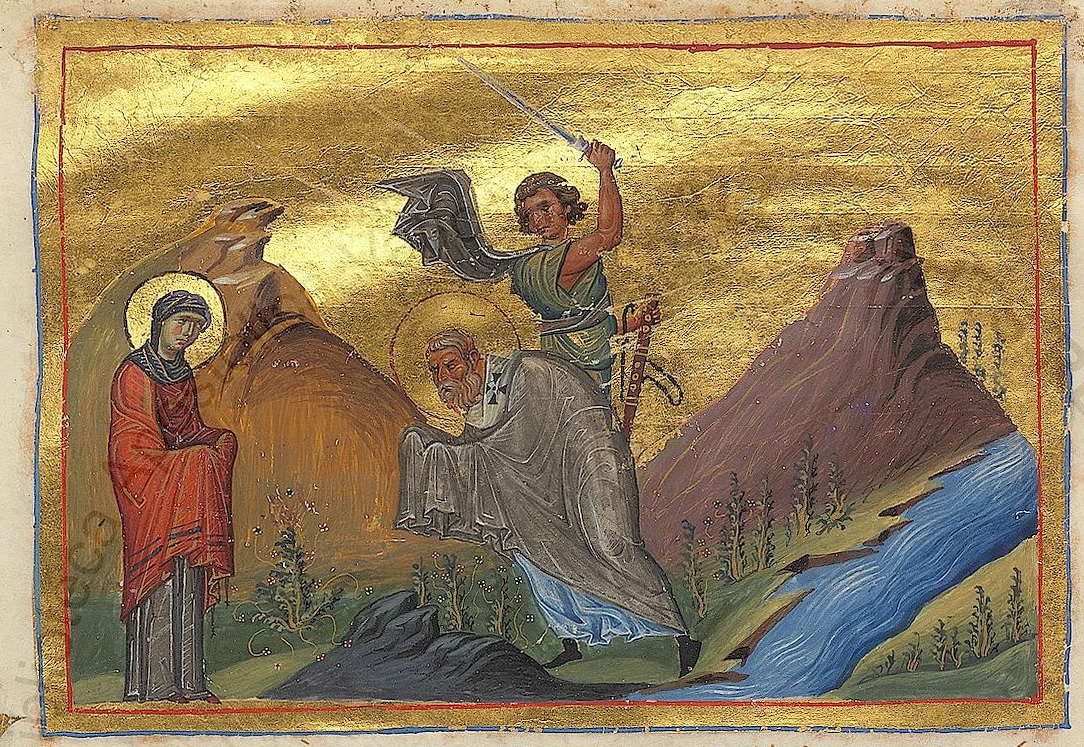
The martyrdom of Cyprian and Justina shown in the 11th century Menologion of Basil II.

During the Diocletian Persecution, On the 6th Day of the 7th Month both were seized and taken to Damascus, where they were tortured. As their faith never wavered, they were brought before Diocletian at Nicomedia, where at his command they were beheaded on the bank of the Gallus River, a tributary of the Sangarius River. The same fate befell a man named Theoctistus, who upon observing Cyprian's faith, declared himself a Christian. After the bodies of the saints had lain unburied for six days, they were taken by Christian sailors to Rome, where they were interred on the estate of a noble lady named Rufina and later entombed in Constantine's basilica. Cyprian was aged 64, beheaded on his Birthday. Justina's age was unknown.

Justina is mentioned in Foxe's Book of Martyrs. It was under the 10th Persecution in AD 303 while Diocletian was Emperor of Rome. It says:

" In the course of time he [Cyprian] became acquainted with Justina, a young lady of Antioch, whose birth, beauty, and accomplishments, rendered her the admiration of all who knew her. A pagan gentleman applied to Cyprian, to promote his suit with the beautiful Justina; this he undertook, but soon himself converted, burnt his books of astrology and magic, received baptism, and felt animated with a powerful spirit of grace. The conversion of Cyprian had a great effect on the pagan gentleman who paid his addresses to Justina, and he in a short time embraced Christianity. During the persecutions of Diocletian, Cyprian and Justina were seized upon as Christians, the former was torn with pincers, and the latter chastised; and, after suffering other torments, both were beheaded."

== Veneration and liturgical celebration ==
Their feast day appeared in the General Roman Calendar of Roman Rite from the thirteenth century until it was deleted in 1969 because of the lack of historical evidence of their existence. Their names were also removed from the 2001 revision of the Roman Martyrology, the official but professedly incomplete list of saints recognized by the Roman Catholic Church. The Roman Martyrology, however, includes five other saints called Cyprian and two named Justina. Some traditionalist Catholics continue to observe their feast based on pre-1970 versions of the Roman Calendar.

== In popular culture ==
The Spanish author, Pedro Calderón de la Barca, took the story as the basis of a drama: El mágico prodigioso. In 2005, American author Tono Rondone published a novel, The Martyrs, which is a continuation of this tradition.

The Great Book of Saint Cyprian is full of prayers and spells, and is widely sold in the Portuguese- and Spanish-speaking world.

Cyprianus is a popular name for a grimoire in Scandinavian folklore.

== See also ==
- List of Christians martyred during the reign of Diocletian
