= Key of Solomon (disambiguation) =

The Key of Solomon is a 14th- or 15th-century pseudoepigraphical grimoire attributed to King Solomon.

Key of Solomon may also refer to:

- The Lesser Key of Solomon, a 17th-century anonymous grimoire
- Solomon's Key, a 1986 video game by Tecmo
  - Solomon's Key 2, a 1992 video game by Tecmo
- The Solomon Key, the working title of the 2009 novel The Lost Symbol by Dan Brown
- "The Lesser Key of Solomon" (Sleepy Hollow), a 2013 television episode

== See also ==
- Clavicula Salomonis (disambiguation)
