= Archidoxis magica =

Grimoire of the 16th century

The Archidoxis magica (The Archidoxes of Magic) is a pseudo-Paracelsian grimoire of the 16th century. The book discusses magical sigils for the use on talismans or amulets.

37	78	29	70	21	62	13	54	5
6	38	79	30	71	22	63	14	46
47	7	39	80	31	72	23	55	15
16	48	8	40	81	32	64	24	56
57	17	49	9	41	73	33	65	25
26	58	18	50	1	42	74	34	66
67	27	59	10	51	2	43	75	35
36	68	19	60	11	52	3	44	76
77	28	69	20	61	12	53	4	45

Sigill Lunae, a 9×9 magic square (sum 369), to be inscribed on a silver talisman

It was first printed in 1591 as part of the tenth and final volume of the collected works of Paracelsus by Johannes Huser of Basel. Even at this time, the editor expressed doubts as to the text being a genuine work by Paracelsus.

The work is the main reason for Paracelsus' reputation as a magician: While Paracelsus did publish works on astrology and divination, there is no reliable evidence that he was pursuing talismanic magic. Schneider (1982) has compared the text of all extant manuscript and printed versions with the text of a then-newly discovered early manuscript, with the conclusion that Paracelsian authorship seems "less unlikely" than previously thought, as the presumed original composition may indeed date to the lifetime of Paracelsus, who died in 1541, but Schneider still concludes that the work as a whole is "spurious" even though portions (especially the first four books) might indeed be based on writings by Paracelsus, and might be contemporary with Paracelsus' own Neun Bücher Archidoxis (a work on medicine written c. 1526 and first printed in 1567).

It was translated into English by R. Turner in 1656, as Of the Supreme Mysteries of Nature. Turner's text is in three parts, The Secrets of Alchemy (pp. 1–28), Of Occult Philosophy (pp. 29–90), Of the Mysteries of the Signes of the Zodiack (pp. 91–158), followed by a short text on The transmutation of metals.

The Lesser Key of Solomon, a grimoire of the mid-17th century, is substantially based on the Archidoxis magica.
