= The Book of Protection =

The Book of Protection: Being a Collection of Charms
- 2011 edition published by Cambridge University Press
- Editor: Hermann Gollancz
- Translator: Hermann Gollancz
- Language: English
- Genre: Book of charms, prayer book
- Publisher: Henry Frowde; Cambridge University Press
- Publication date: 1912
- Publication place: United Kingdom
- Pages: 236
- ISBN: 9781108027748

The Book of Protection: Being a Collection of Charms is a collection of East Syriac Christian charms and incantations associated with the so-called 'Nestorian' Church (today's Assyrian Church of the East), edited and translated by Hermann Gollancz from three Syriac manuscripts which date back to early 19th century and earlier. The compilation was first published in 1912 by Henry Frowde, with 27 illustrations from Codex A.

== Brief history ==
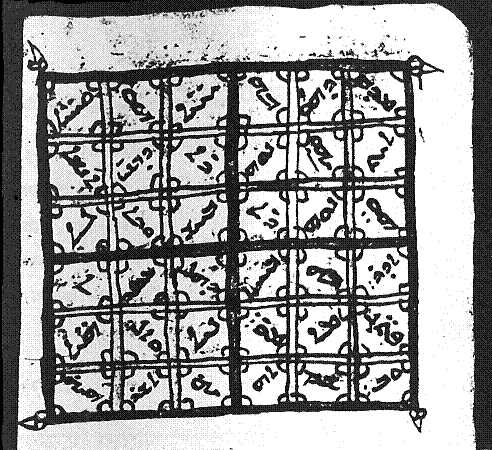
Magic diagram containing the words of St John. Illustration from Codex A.

The book is a translation of three manuscripts written in Syriac, two of them were in the possession of Hermann Gollancz, the third from Cambridge University Library. They were probably written or compiled by a native of the country which lies to the north of Mosul. The owner was possibly a priest or some kind of officer of the Nestorian Church to whom men made application for spells, incantatory prayers and formulae of blessing to help them both spiritually and physically. According to the tradition, this collection of prayers and charms was given to Adam by the angels, and which was then handed down and augmented up to the time of King Solomon.

The two manuscripts in Gollancz's possession, were first brought to public notice at the International Congress of Orientalists held at Paris in 1897. Gollancz described that it was his intention at first simply to make a reference to William Wright's A catalogue of the Syriac manuscripts preserved in the library of the University of Cambridge (1901), which has a description concerning these manuscripts. However, he then decided to publish the full collection, together with a translation.

== Description ==
Codex A is the larger manuscript that was owned by Gollancz, it is dated '2114 of the blessed Greeks', which corresponds to the year 1802–3. This one contains a much larger number of incantations, the place in which it was written is Shibani, Turkish Kurdistan. The smaller one, which is called Codex B, is older and has vowel signs throughout. The headings in both are in red, the main portion in black. The third one, Codex C, is the Cambridge manuscript. They all contain illustrations, such as the Angel Gabriel mounted on a white horse driving his spear into the body of the devil-woman of the evil eye; George of Lydda spearing the Great Dragon; Elijah and Enoch eating the fruit of the Tree of Life, et cetera.

== Synopsis ==
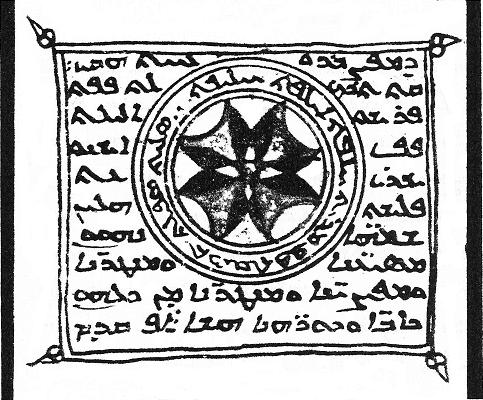
The Names of God on the Ring of Solomon. Illustration from Codex A.

The charms range from antidotes to headaches, colic and 'teeth chattering' to prayers for protecting flocks, herds and possessions generally; for controlling mad dogs, unruly cows and 'the gun of warriors', as well as for warding off the evil eye. The source of the power which underlies these charms is the Name of God YHWH and His other names Adonai, El Shaddai, El Sabaoth, et cetera. They begin with the Trinitarian formula and often invoke specific biblical stories to add force. Codex C shows that the compiler, like the Hebrews in Kabbalah, Samaritans and Ethiopians, believed firmly in the power of a spell cast in the names of the archangels and angels.
