= The Grimoire of Pope Honorius =

17th to 18th century grimoire

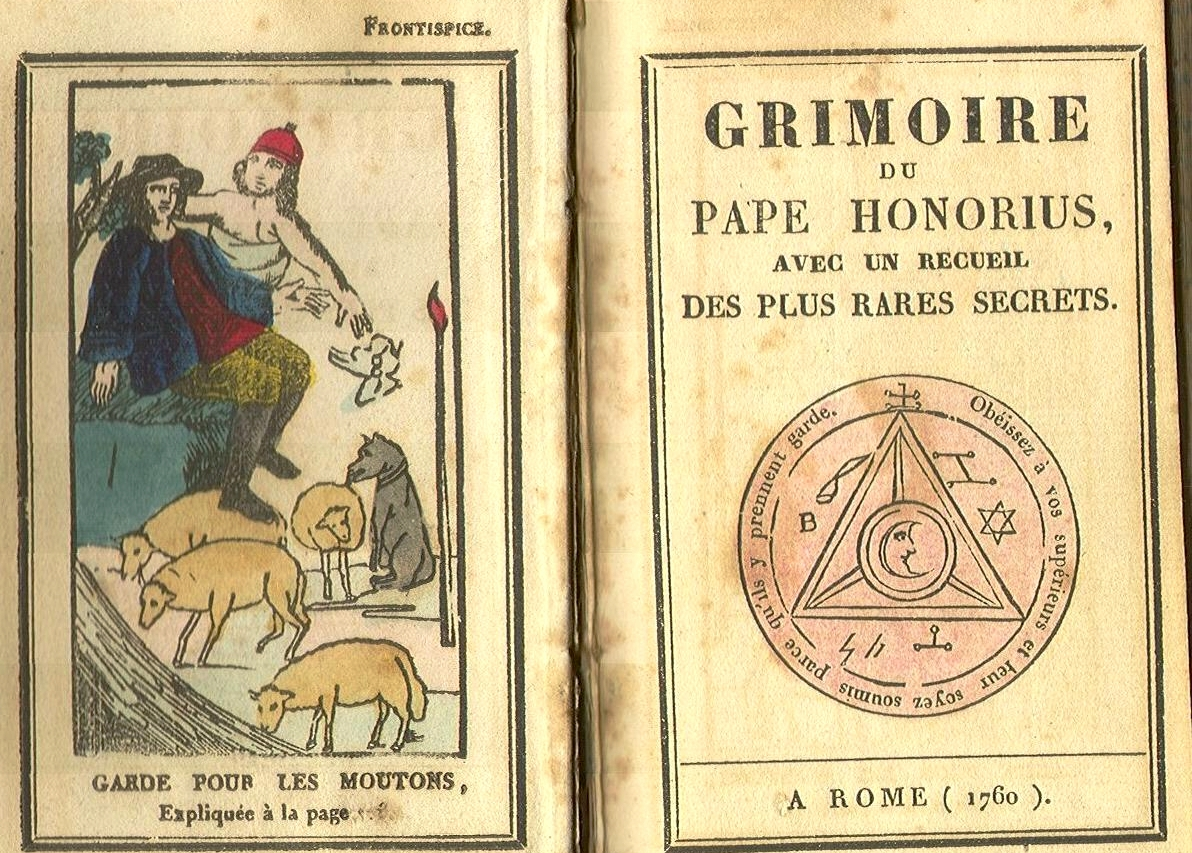
Grimoire du Pape Honorius (1760)

The Grimoire of Pope Honorius, or Le Grimoire du Pape Honorius, is a 17th to 18th century grimoire, which claims to have been written by Pope Honorius III (1150–1227). It is unique among grimoires in that it was specifically designed to be used by a priest, and some of the instructions include saying a Mass. While its name might be derived from the 13th century grimoire The Sworn Book of Honorius, its content is closer to later grimoires like the Key of Solomon and Grimorium Verum.

The first edition of the Grimoire is said to have appeared in 1629, and was likely forged near the end of the sixteenth century, roughly four hundred years after the death of its supposed author. According to A. E. Waite, "...[I]t is a malicious and somewhat clever imposture, which was undeniably calculated to deceive ignorant persons of its period who may have been magically inclined, more especially ignorant priests, since it pretends to convey the express sanction of the Apostolical Seat for the operations of Infernal Magic and Necromancy." According to Éliphas Lévi, "Some old copies of the Grimoire of Honorius bear, however, the name of Honorius II, but it is impossible to make a sorcerer of that elegant Cardinal Lambert (...) But it so happens that the name of Honorius II is for us as a ray of light pointing to the true author of the frightful grimoire in question (...) In 1061, the bishops of Lombardy, impelled by Gilbert of Parma, protested against the election of Anselm, Bishop of Lucca, who had been raised to the papal chair as Alexander II. They chose Cadulus or Cadalus, an intriguing Bishop of Parma, a man capable of all crimes and a public scandal in respect of simony and concubinage. He assumed the name of Honorius II. (...) The anti-pope was deposed by the Council of Mantua and Henry IV obtained his pardon. Cadalus returned into obscurity and it is then probably that he decided to become the high priest of sorcerers and apostates, in which capacity, and under the name of Honorius II, he composed the Grimoire that passes under this name."

== See also ==
- Goetia
