= Lamen (magic) =

Magical pendant worn around the neck

John Dee's heptarchic lamen

A lamen (Latin, meaning "plate") is a magical pendant used as a protective 'magical breastplate' worn around the neck so that it hangs upon the breast over the heart. Its uses vary but, most commonly, the term refers to a symbol of authority and a focus of magical energies.

== In ceremonial magic ==
Aleister Crowley described the lamen as "a sort of coat of arms. It expresses the character and powers of the wearer." Crowley and DuQuette have proposed that the magical lamen might be a modern adaptation of the priestly breastplate of the ancient Hebrews.

The magician may wear a lamen as a representation of his personal relation to his godhead or the universal forces of balance and enlightenment.

Within group ceremony, lamens are frequently worn as symbols of particular offices or roles within the ritual work. Many magical orders also use a particular lamen design to show membership and align energies of individual members with the group dynamic.

Rose Cross lamen as used by the Hermetic Order of the Golden Dawn

Various magical orders use lamens in one or more of these ways, including Ordo Templi Orientis and Hermetic Order of the Golden Dawn.

Lamens may also be used by magicians to evoke certain spirits of the Key of Solomon. Specialized lamens are also used in the workings described in The Book of Abramelin.
