= Clavis =

Clavis may refer to:

- Glossary, an alphabetical list of terms in a particular domain of knowledge with the definitions for those terms
- Handcuffs, restraint devices designed to secure an individual's wrists in proximity to each other
- Clavis (publisher), a Flemish publishing house of children's literature
- Clavis aurea, a Latin phrase meaning "golden key"
- O Clavis David, a O Antiphon for December 20
- Clavis Patrum Graecorum, a series of volumes that aims to contain a list of all the Fathers of the Church who wrote in Greek from the 1st to the 8th centuries
- Clavis Salomonis (English: Key of Solomon), a pseudepigraphical grimoire attributed to King Solomon

== See also ==
- Clavicula (disambiguation)
