= The Magus (Barrett book) =

Book by occultist Francis Barrett

The Magus, or Celestial Intelligencer is a handbook of the occult and ceremonial magic compiled by occultist Francis Barrett published in 1801.

== Contents and sources ==
Much of the material was collected by Barrett from older occult handbooks, as he hints in the preface:

We have collected out of the works of the most famous magicians, such as Zoroaster, Hermes, Apollonius, Simon of the Temple, Trithemius, Agrippa, Porta (the Neapolitan), Dee, Paracelsus, Roger Bacon, and a great many others...

In fact, most of the material comes from Agrippa's Three Books of Occult Philosophy and Pietro d'Abano's Heptameron.

Previous demonologists such as Binsfeld (1589) had drawn up lists that comprised a hierarchy of devils, and attributed to them the power to instigate people to commit the seven deadly sins. Lucifer was associated with Pride, Satan with Anger and so forth. In The Magus Barrett altered the "roster of devils" and Satan now became a prince of deluders (serving conjurers and witches).

== Publication and influence ==
The book was originally published with two books in a single volume, as was common with many texts of this period. It facilitated the modern revival of magic by making information from otherwise rare books more readily available.

== See also ==
- Ceremonial magic
- Classification of demons
- Christian angelic hierarchy
