= Clavicula Salomonis =

Clavicula Salomonis may refer to:

- Clavicula Salomonis, the Latin title of the 14th- or 15th-century grimoire Key of Solomon
- Lemegeton Clavicula Salomonis, the Latin title of the 17th-century grimoire The Lesser Key of Solomon
- Clavicula Salomonis (EP), a 2005 EP by De Magia Veterum

== See also ==
- Key of Solomon (disambiguation)
