= The Sworn Book of Honorius =

Medieval grimoire

The Sworn Book of Honorius (Latin: Liber juratus Honorii, also Liber sacer, sacratus or consecratus) is a medieval grimoire purportedly written by Honorius of Thebes. The Latin word juratus, which is typically translated "sworn", is intended to mean "oathbound". Its name comes from the alleged compiler Honorius of Thebes, son of Euclid.

The book is one of the oldest existing medieval grimoires as well as one of the most influential.

== Historical references ==
Its date of composition is uncertain, but it is possibly mentioned as Liber Sacer in the 13th century, apparently asserting a date in the High Middle Ages. The first certain historical record is the 1347 trial record of Étienne Pépin from Mende, Gévaudan, in the Kingdoms of France and Navarre. Johannes Hartlieb (1456) mentions it as one of the books used in necromancy. The oldest preserved manuscript dates to the 14th century, Sloane MS 3854 (fol 117-144). Sloane MS 313, dating to the late 14th or early 15th century, was once in the possession of John Dee.

The first printed manuscript of this work did not appear until 1629.

== Content ==
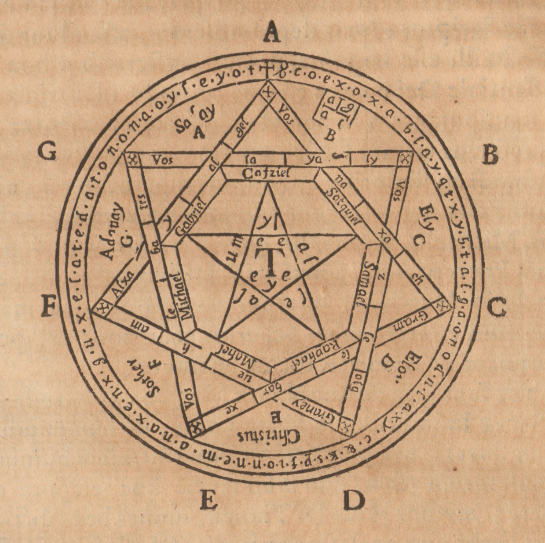
Oedipus Aegyptiacus; amulet of Venus and Mars derived from the sigillum dei ("small seal of god") of the Sworn Book of Honorius

The Sworn Book is supposedly the product of a conference of magicians who decided to condense all of their knowledge into one volume. In 93 chapters, it covers a large variety of topics, from how to save one's soul from purgatory to catching thieves or finding treasures. It has many instructions on how to conjure and command demons, to work other magical operations and knowledge of what lies in Heaven among other highly sought information. Like many grimoires, it has lengthy dissertations for proper operation and seals to be used.

The author says, "I, Honorius, have laid out the works of Solomon in such a manner in my book," indicating that his sourcebooks are attributed to Solomon. The Sworn Book features the Seal of Solomon and contains ritual elements which are characteristic of the Pseudo-Solomonic corpus of magical literature. Indeed, the so-called "northern European" or "London" version of the Sworn Book uses prayers from the glossed version of the Notory Art (Ars Notoria), a medieval treatise on angelic magic attributed to King Solomon.

Berengario Ganell's version of the Sworn Book, contained within his Best of the Sacred Magic (Summa Sacrae Magicae), uses the fifty-one prayers from the little prayer book called The Book of Three Souls (Liber Trium Animarum) rather than those found in the Notory Art.

== Author ==
The purported author, Honorius of Thebes, is a possibly mythical character from the Middle Ages. Considerable mystery still exists about the identity of Honorius. Honorius of Thebes is also claimed to be the creator of the Theban alphabet, in Heinrich Cornelius Agrippa's De Occulta Philosophia (1533) and Johannes Trithemius's Polygraphia (1518).

According to the Sworn Book of Honorius, he is supposed to be "the son of Euclid, master of the Thebians". The book, however, provides little elucidation as to who this might be; no sources to substantiate the claim are given. The reader might assume that Thebes in Greece is intended, but no better context can be inferred.

== Editions ==
- Joseph H Peterson, The Sworn Book of Honorius: Liber Iuratus Honorii, Ibis Press (2016), ISBN 978-0892542154.
- Daniel Driscoll, The Sworn Book of Honourius the Magician, Heptangle Books, 1977.
- Gösta Hedegård, Liber Iuratus Honorii: A Critical Edition of the Latin Version of the Sworn Book of Honorius, Studia Latina Stockholmiensia 48, Almqvist & Wiksell (2002), ISBN 978-91-22-01970-1.

== See also ==
- The Grimoire of Pope Honorius
- Renaissance magic
