= The Book of Ceremonial Magic =

1910 book by Arthur Edward Waite

- Cover of the 1961 edition
- Author: Arthur Edward Waite
- Publisher: Rider & Son
- Publication date: 1910 (privately in 1898)

The Book of Ceremonial Magic by Arthur Edward Waite offers a history of notable grimoires, refutes many legends surrounding them, and analyzes their theological systems. After Waite privately distributed an earlier edition as The Book of Black Magic and of Pacts in 1898, Rider & Son published the work with its new title in 1910.
