= The Sword of Moses =

Apocryphal book of ancient Hebrew magic

The Sword of Moses (Harba de-Moshe) is an apocryphal Aramaic–Hebrew book of magic, written or compiled by an anonymous Jew sometime before the 11th century, probably in Byzantine or early Muslim Palestine.

It was edited by Moses Gaster in Zikhron Ya'akov in 1896 from a 13th- or 14th-century manuscript from his own collection, formerly MS Gaster 78, now London, British Library MS Or. 10678. Gaster assumed that the text predates the 11th century, based on a letter by Hai ben Sherira (939-1038) which mentions the book alongside the Sefer haYashar, described as another book of formulas, and that it may even date to as early as the first four centuries. Yuval Harari disagrees, saying, "It seems more reasonable that the book stemmed from the (later) era of magical treatises, such as Pishra de-Rabbi Hanina ben Dosa or Havdala de-Rabbi Aqiva. Although there is no hard proof for the date of origin of any of these compositions (including The Sword of Moses), scholars tend to agree that they were compiled during the third quarter of the first millennium."

Besides the medieval manuscript used by Gaster, a short fragment of the text survives in Cod. Oxford 1531. A new critical edition was printed in 1997 by the Israeli scholar Yuval Harari based on a variant text found in another manuscript. An English translation of the same was published in 2012.

== Contents ==
The largest manuscript of the Sword of Moses begins with a description of the heavenly realms and angels, and soon moves onto describing various prayers, invocations, and ritual procedures that the reader is to perform before he is able to use the "Sword"; this term refers to a huge list of magical names later in the text, divided into 136 sections, each with a different magical use. The list of names is given first, followed by its uses in the next section:

[1]If at a full moon you wish to seize and to bind a man and a woman so that they will be with each other, and to annul spirits and blast-demons and satans, and to bind a boat, and to free a man from prison, and for every thing, write on a red plate from TWBR TSBR until H’ BŠMHT.[2] And if you wish to destroy high mountains and to pass (in safety) through the sea and the land, and to go down into fire and come up, and to remove kings, and to cause an optical illusion, and to stop up a mouth, and to converse with the dead, and to kill the living, and to bring down and raise up and adjure angels to abide by you, and to learn all the secrets of the world, write on a silver plate, and put in it a root of artemisia, from TWBR TSBR until H’BŠMHT. [3]For a spirit that moves in the body, write on magzab from TWBR until MNGYNWN. [4]For a spirit that causes inflammation, write from MGNYNWN until HYDRSṬ'.

Here is a brief abstract of the original Sword of Moses by Gaster:

The Sword of Moses. In the name of the mighty and holy God! Four angels are appointed to the “Sword” given by the Lord, the Master of mysteries, and they are appointed to the Law, and they see with penetration the mysteries from above and below; and these are their names — SKD HUZI, MRGIOIAL, VHDRZIOLO, TOTRISI. [CQD HUZI MRGIZIAL, UHDRZIULU, TUTRISI] And over these are five others, holy and mighty, who meditate on the mysteries of God in the world for seven hours every day, and they are appointed to thousands of thousands, and to myriads of thousands of Chariots, ready to do the will of their Creator.

Here is a brief abstract of the book The Sword of Moses :

In the name of mighty and holy God!

Four angels are appointed to the Sword given by the Lord, the Master of mysteries, and they are appointed the Law, and they see with penetration the mysteries from above and below; and these are their names-SHAQADHUZIAY, MARGIYOIEL, ASHARUYLIAY, TOTRUSIYAY. Pronounced Shaqad Hozi, Marji-wial, Hade-ru-i-zelu, Tu-ter-i-si And over these are five others, holy and mighty, who meditate on the mysteries of God in the world for seven hours every day, and they are appointed to thousands of thousands, and to myriads of thousands of Chariots, ready to do the will of their Creator. If you look at the transliteration of the Sacred names of the 4 angels appointed to the Sword. You will see I have decoded them. SKD HUZI= SHAQADHUZIAY MRGIOIAL= MARGIYOIEL VHDRZIOLO= ASHARUYLIAY TOTRISI= TOTRUSIYAY

[CQD HUZI MRGIZIAL, UHDRZIULU, TUTRISI]

== Editions ==
- Gaster, Moses. "(1897) חרבא דמשה". www.hebrewbooks.org.
- Yuval Harari, אקדמון Israel (1997) חרבא דמשה: מהדורה חדשה ומחקר
- Harari, Yuval (2012). "The Sword of Moses (Ḥarba de-Moshe): A New Translation and Introduction". Magic, Ritual, and Witchcraft. 7 (1): 58–98. doi:10.1353/mrw.2012.0008. S2CID 162236993.
- Geoffrey Harris, Author Of The Sword Of Moses With All The Divine Names
- L'Épée de Moïse, H'arba de-Moshé, Traité de Magie Juive. Collection Kabbale. Sesheta-Publications.fr, 2021.

Магия Моисея (сборник) / Пер. И. Бенгальский, Е. Кузьмин. — СПб.: Издательство «Академия исследований культуры», 2024.

== See also ==
- Old Testament Pseudepigrapha
- Assumption of Moses
