= Grand Grimoire =

18th-century grimoire

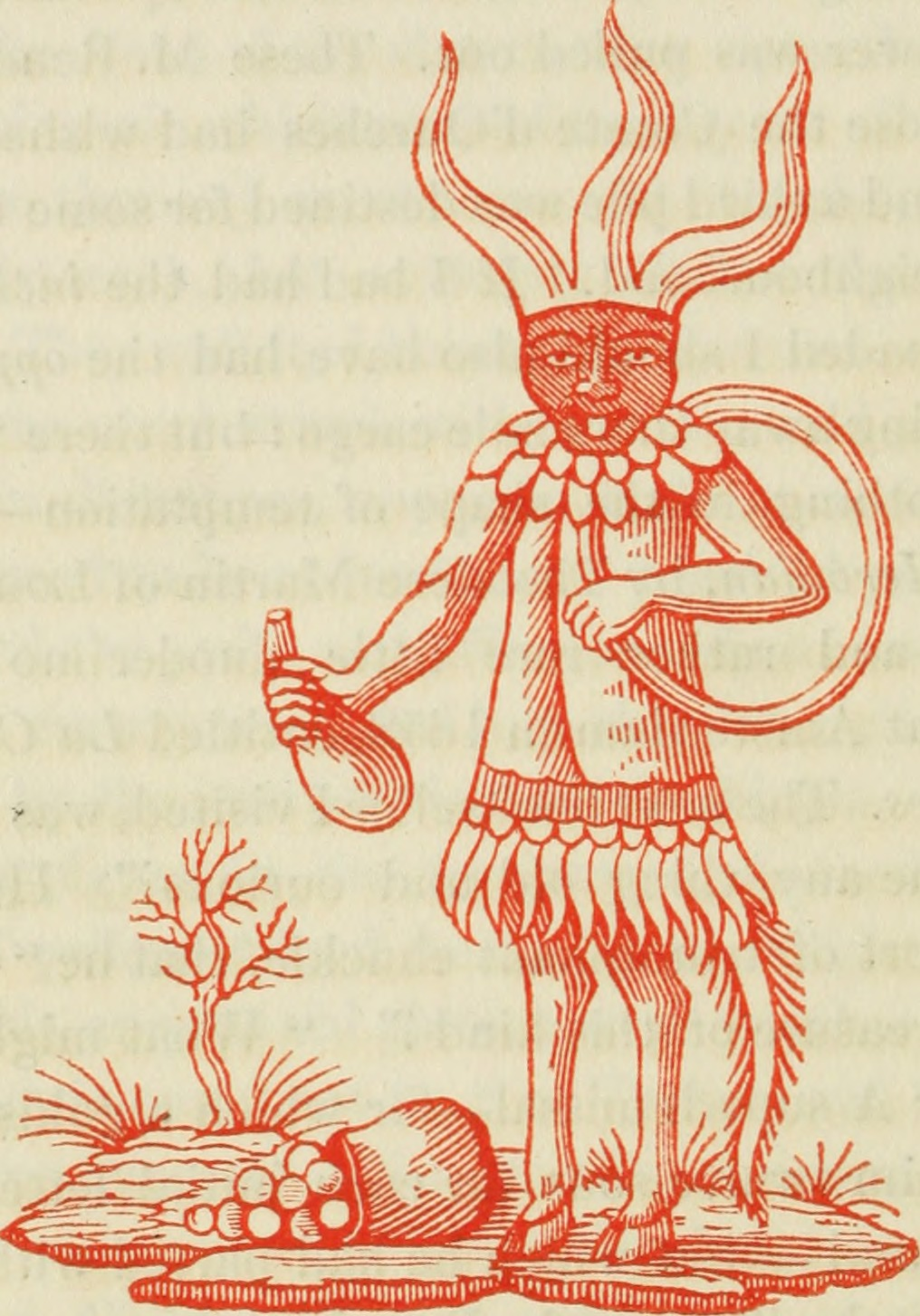
Frontispiece for an edition of The Grand Grimoire

The Grand Grimoire, also known as Le Dragon Rouge or The Red Dragon, is a black magic goetic grimoire. Different editions date the book to 1521, 1522 or 1421. Owen Davies suggests 1702 is when the first edition may have been created and a Bibliothèque bleue version (a popular edition, similar to a chapbook) of the text may have been published in 1750. The 19th-century French occultist Éliphas Lévi considered the contemporary edition of Le Dragon Rouge to be a counterfeit of a true, older Grand Grimoire.

The "introductory chapter" was written by Antonio Venitiana del Rabina, who said he had gathered his information from original writings of King Solomon. Much of the material of this grimoire derives from the Key of Solomon and the Lesser Key of Solomon, pseudepigraphical grimoires attributed to King Solomon. The first book contains instructions for summoning Lucifer or the demon Lucifuge Rofocale, for the purpose of forming a deal with the Devil.

== Contents ==
The book is divided into two books. The first book contains instructions for summoning a demon and for the construction of tools with which to force the demon to do one's bidding. The second book is divided further into two parts: the Sanctum Regnum ("Holy Kingdom") and Secrets, de L'Art Magique du Grand Grimoire ("Secrets, of the magic art of the Grand Grimoire"). The Sanctum Regnum contain instructions for making a pact with the demon, allowing one to command the spirit without the tools required by book one, but at greater risk. Secrets contains simple spells and rituals one can employ after having performed the ritual of the first book. Some editions contain a short text between these two parts, Le Secret Magique, où le Grand Art de pouvoir parler aux Morts (The Magic Secret, or the Grand Art of being able to speak with the dead), dealing with necromancy.

The book describes several demons as well as the rituals to summon them in order to make a pact with them. It also details several spells for winning a lottery, talking to spirits, being loved by a girl, making oneself invisible, etc.

=== List of demons ===
This book mentions three greater demons. These demons are similarly prioritized in Grimorium Verum.

- Lucifer, emperor
- Beelzebub, prince
- Astaroth, grand duke

It also mentions six lesser demons:

- Lucifuge Rofocale, prime minister
- Satanachia, commander in chief (in French, "commandant en chef")
- Agaliarept, commandant
- Fleurèty, lieutenant-general
- Sargatanas, brigadier-major
- Nebiros, marshal and inspector general

== In popular culture ==
The 1989 horror film Warlock features a "Grand Grimoire" as the core plot device, which is equated with the Key of Solomon and Book of Shadows.

The 2007 novel God's Demon by Wayne Barlowe features most of the Grand Grimoire's named demons as characters, including Sargatanas as its protagonist.

In its 2014-15 second season, the Fox TV series Sleepy Hollow presents the Grand Grimoire as once owned by occultist John Dee and coveted by an evil warlock named Solomon Kent. It became possessed by one of the series' antagonists, Henry Parrish, and helped cause the demise of protagonist Katrina Crane.

Danyal Hussein, the killer of Bibaa Henry and Nicole Smallman in Kingsbury, London in 2020, claimed to have invoked Lucifuge Rofocale prior to the killings. He hoped that by sacrificing their lives to the demon, he would win a lottery. Hussein had promised to "sacrifice" at least six women every six months in a handwritten agreement with the devil, signed with his own blood.

== See also ==
- Grand Albert
- Petit Albert
