= Grimorium Verum =

Eighteenth-century grimoire

The full sigil of Lucifer, as it originally appeared in the Grimorium Verum

The Grimorium Verum (Latin for True Grimoire) is an 18th-century grimoire attributed to one "Alibeck the Egyptian" of Memphis, who purportedly wrote it in 1517. Like many grimoires, it claims a tradition originating with King Solomon.

The grimoire is not a translation of an earlier work as purported, its original appearing in French or Italian in the mid-18th century, as noted already by A. E. Waite who discussed the work in his The Book of Ceremonial Magic (1911), stating:

The date specified in the title of the Grimorium Verum is undeniably fraudulent; the work belongs to the middle of the eighteenth century, and Memphis is Rome.

One version of the Grimoire was included as The Clavicles of King Solomon: Book 3 in one of the French manuscripts S. L. MacGregor Mathers incorporated in his version of the Key of Solomon, but it was omitted from the Key with the following explanation:

At the end there are some short extracts from the Grimorium Verum with the Seals of evil spirits, which, as they do not belong to the Key of Solomon proper, I have not given. For the evident classification of the Key is in two books and no more.

Idries Shah also published some of it in The Secret Lore of Magic: Book of the Sorcerers in 1957.

== Contents of the book ==
=== Book one ===
"Concerning the character of demons" In particular the superior spirits of Lucifer, Beelzebub, Astaroth, including the many inferior spirits below them and their invoking sigils.

=== Book two ===
"Of planetary hours"

=== Book three ===
"The preparation of the operator"

=== Book four ===
"Here begins the Sanctum Regnum, called the royalty of spirits, or the Little Key of Solomon, a most learned Hebraic necromancer and Rabbi. This book contains various combinations of characters whereby the powers can be invoked or brought forth whensoever you may wish, each according to his faculty."

== Editions ==
- Trident Books (1994, 2nd. ed. 1997) ISBN 1-879000-03-2
- Joseph H. Peterson (2007) ISBN 978-1-4348-1116-5
- Jake Stratton-Kent (2009). Scarlet Imprint. ISBN 978-0-9567203-2-0.
- Tarl Warwick (2015). ISBN 978-1-5192-0928-3.
