= Pietro d'Abano =

Italian philosopher and astrologer (c. 1257–1316)

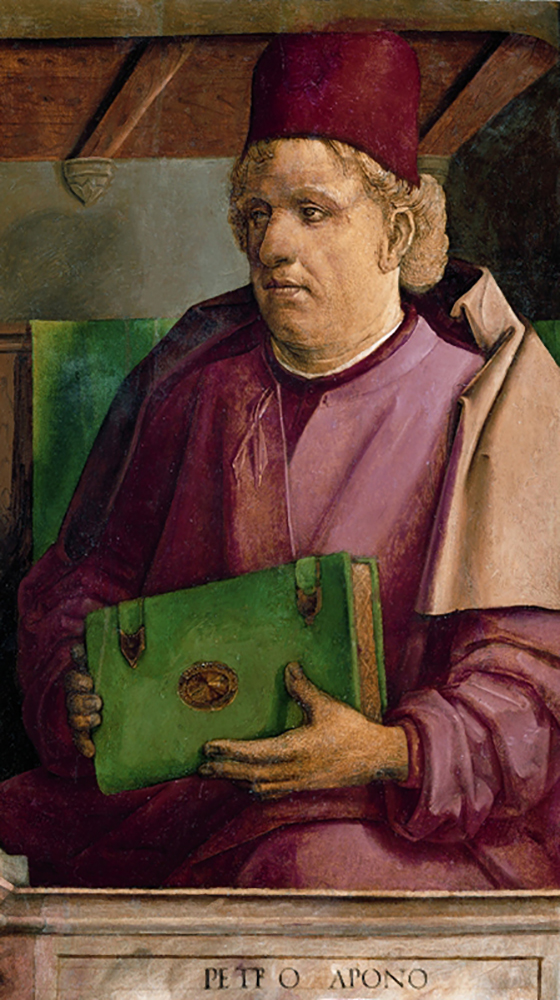
- Born: c. 1257; Abano Terme
- Died: c. 1315; Rome
- Occupations: Philosopher; Astrologer; Physician

Pietro d'Abano, also known as Petrus de Apono, Petrus Aponensis or Peter of Abano (c. 1257 – 1316), was an Italian philosopher, astrologer, and professor of medicine in Padua. He was born in the Italian town from which he takes his name, now Abano Terme. He gained fame by writing Conciliator Differentiarum, quae inter Philosophos et Medicos Versantur. He was eventually accused of heresy and atheism, and came before the Inquisition. He died in prison in 1316 (some sources say 1315) before the end of his trial.

== Biography ==
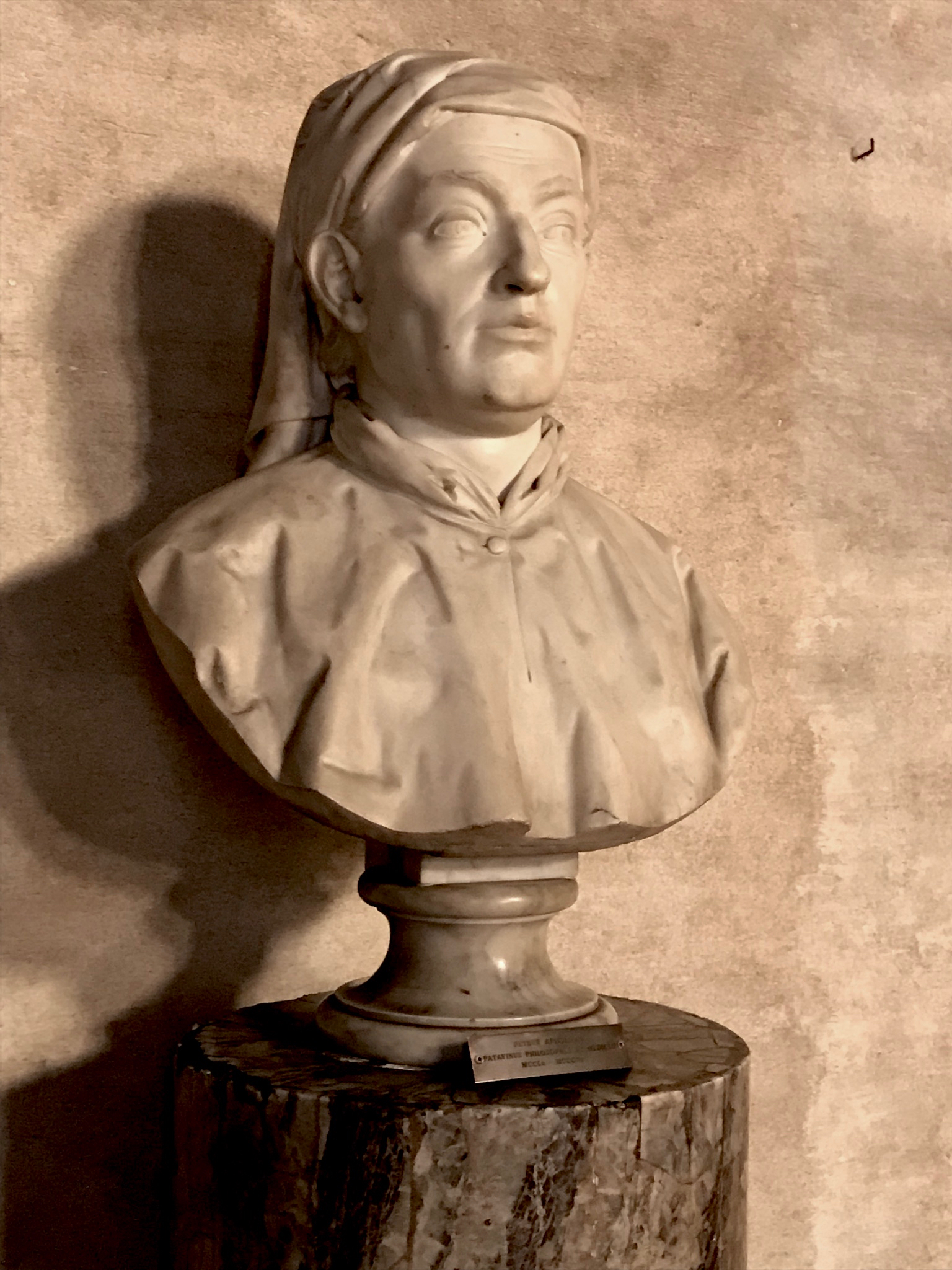
Bust of Pietro d'Abano at the University of Padua in Palazzo del Bo, Padua.

Little is known about his early life, particularly before his studies. He lived in Greece for a period of time before he moved and commenced his studies for a long time at Constantinople (between 1270 and 1290). Here, he learned the Greek language. Around 1300 he moved to Paris, where he was promoted to the degrees of doctor in philosophy and medicine, in the practice of which he was very successful, but his fees were remarkably high. In Paris, he began to have issues with the inquisition. Here, he became known as "the Great Lombard". In 1306, he left Paris and returned to Padua. Here, he gained a reputation as a physician. In Padua he befriended an older scholar Paolo Tosetti. Also an astrologer, he was charged with practicing magic: the particular accusations being that he brought back into his purse, by the aid of the devil, all the money he paid away, and that he possessed the philosopher's stone.

Gabriel Naudé, in his Antiquitate Scholae Medicae Parisiensis, gives the following account of him:

Let us next produce Peter de Apona, or Peter de Abano, called the Reconciler, on account of the famous book which he published during his residence in your university. It is certain that physic lay buried in Italy, scarce known to any one, uncultivated and unadorned, till its tutelar genius, a villager of Apona, destined to free Italy from its barbarism and ignorance, as Camillus once freed Rome from the siege of the Gauls, made diligent enquiry in what part of the world polite literature was most happily cultivated, philosophy most subtilly handled, and physic taught with the greatest solidity and purity; and being assured that Paris alone laid claim to this honour, thither he presently flies; giving himself up wholly to her tutelage, he applied himself diligently to the mysteries of philosophy and medicine; obtained a degree and the laurel in both; and afterwards taught them both with great applause: and after a stay of many years, loaden with the wealth acquired among you, and, after having become the most famous philosopher, astrologer, physician, and mathematician of his time, returns to his own country, where, in the opinion of the judicious Scardeon, he was the first restorer of true philosophy and physic. Gratitude, therefore, calls upon you to acknowledge your obligations due to Michæl Angelus Blondus, a physician of Rome, who in the last century undertaking to publish the Conciliationes Physiognomicæ of your Aponensian doctor, and finding they had been composed at Paris, and in your university, chose to publish them in the name, and under the patronage, of your society.

He carried his enquiries so far into the occult sciences of abstruse and hidden nature, that, after having given most ample proofs, by his writings concerning physiognomy, geomancy, and palmistry, he moved on to the study of philosophy, physics, and astrology. These studies proved extremely advantageous to him. The first two led to his introduction to all the popes of his time and gained him a reputation among scholars. Beyond that, his mastery of astrology is shown by

- the astronomical figures he had painted in the great hall of the palace at Padua
- his translations of the books of the great learned rabbi Abraham Aben Ezra
- his own books on critical days
- the improvement of astronomy
- and the testimony of the renowned mathematician Regiomontanus, who praised his mastery of astrology in his public oration at Padua on Al-Farghani's masterwork Elements of astronomy on the celestial motions.

== Writings ==
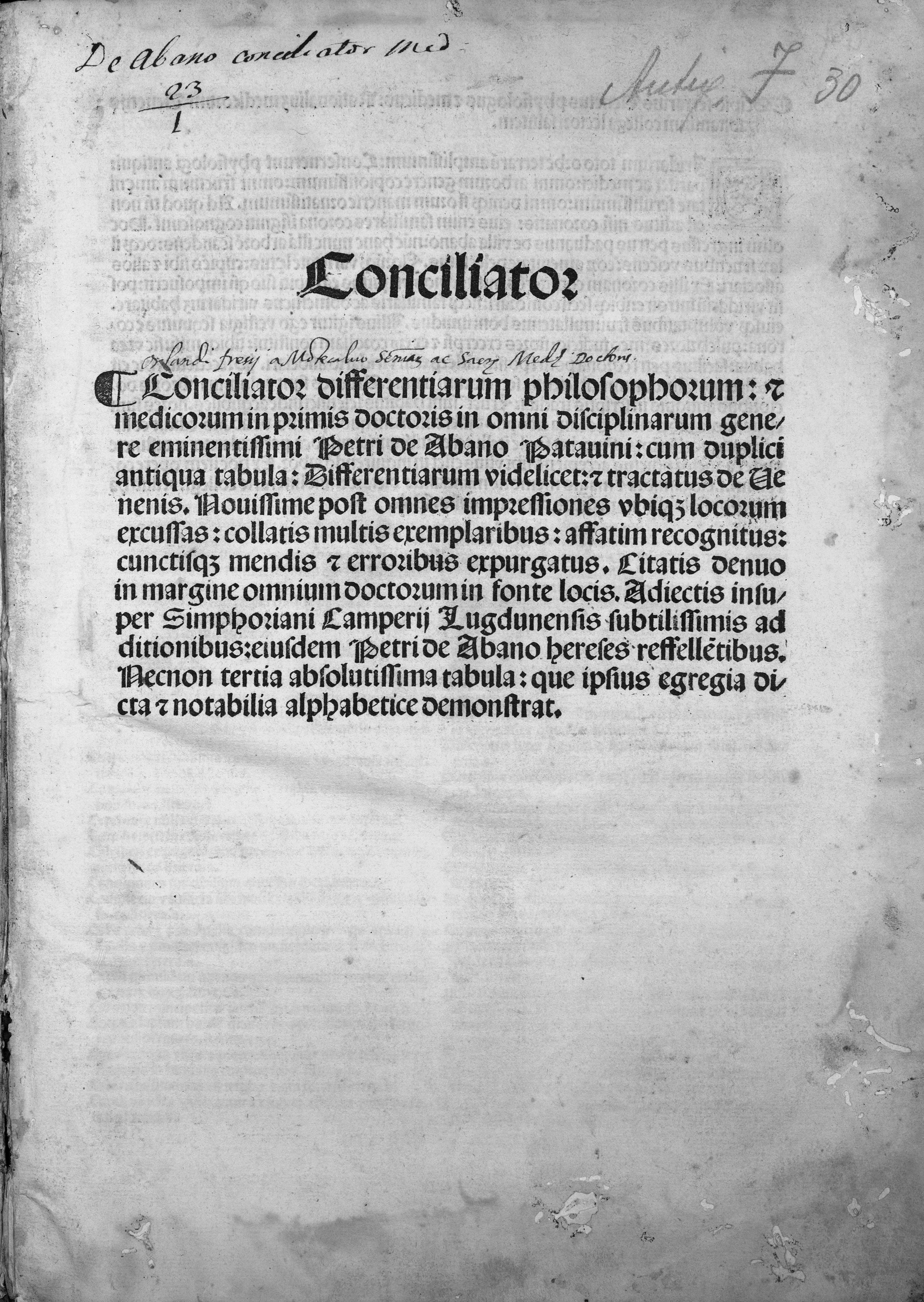
Conciliator differentiarum philosophorum et precipue medicorum

In his writings he expounds and advocates the medical and philosophical systems of Averroes, Avicenna, and other Islamic writers. His best known works are the Conciliator differentiarum quae inter philosophos et medicos versantur and De venenis eorumque remediis, both of which are extant in dozens of manuscripts and various printed editions from the late fifteenth through sixteenth centuries. The former was an attempt to reconcile apparent contradictions between medical theory and Aristotelian natural philosophy, and was considered authoritative as late as the sixteenth century. Part of the Pietro's work revolved around reconciling apparent differences between what was known regarding the five senses at the time and Aristotelian natural philosophy.

Regarding Touch, Pietro aligned both Aristotle's views with at the time modern medical information regarding nerves. On this, Pietro explains that while nerves are important in the sensation of touch, they are not the only part of the body responsible for the sensation. He goes on to state that because nerves exist throughout the body, the heart must also be involved. Furthering this idea, he explains that flesh and nerves are the medium of the sensation, and take this sensation back to the heart. This aligns with Aristotle's vision of the heart being the central organ regarding touch. Pietro adds nerves as the secondary organ in this matter.

On smell, Pietro refutes the claim that Aristotle thought smell was evaporation, which many authors believed at the time. Instead, Pietro claims that Aristotle presented a counter example, citing that Aristotle asked if smell was in the water for fish. Because evaporation happens in the air, and not in the water, Pietro insists that smell, in Aristotle's view, could not have been fuming evaporation. In Problemata, Pietro argues that the idea of smell being some kind of fuel is not an Aristotelian viewpoint, but one of Plato and his followers. Pietro goes on to discuss how Aristotle says in De sensu et sensato 5 that there were two different kinds of smell: objects that are essentially smelly, and object that are accidentally smelly. The distinction is between how objects are, and how objects are perceived to be. Regarding anatomy, Pietro theorized that smell was carried through the nose by nerves which then went to the common sense in the brain. Pietro also theorized how smell worked with other senses. For example, Pietro discussed how smell and taste work together, theorizing that animal spirits were affected by smelly evaporations through the lungs, which gave them a nourishing effect.

The famous grimoire called the Heptameron, though anonymous, has been traditionally attributed to Pietro. The Heptameron is a concise book of ritual magical rites concerned with conjuring specific angels for the seven days of the week, whence the title derives. He is also credited with writing De venenis eorumque remediis, which expounded on Arab theories concerning superstitions, poisons and contagions.

== Beliefs in magic and healing ==
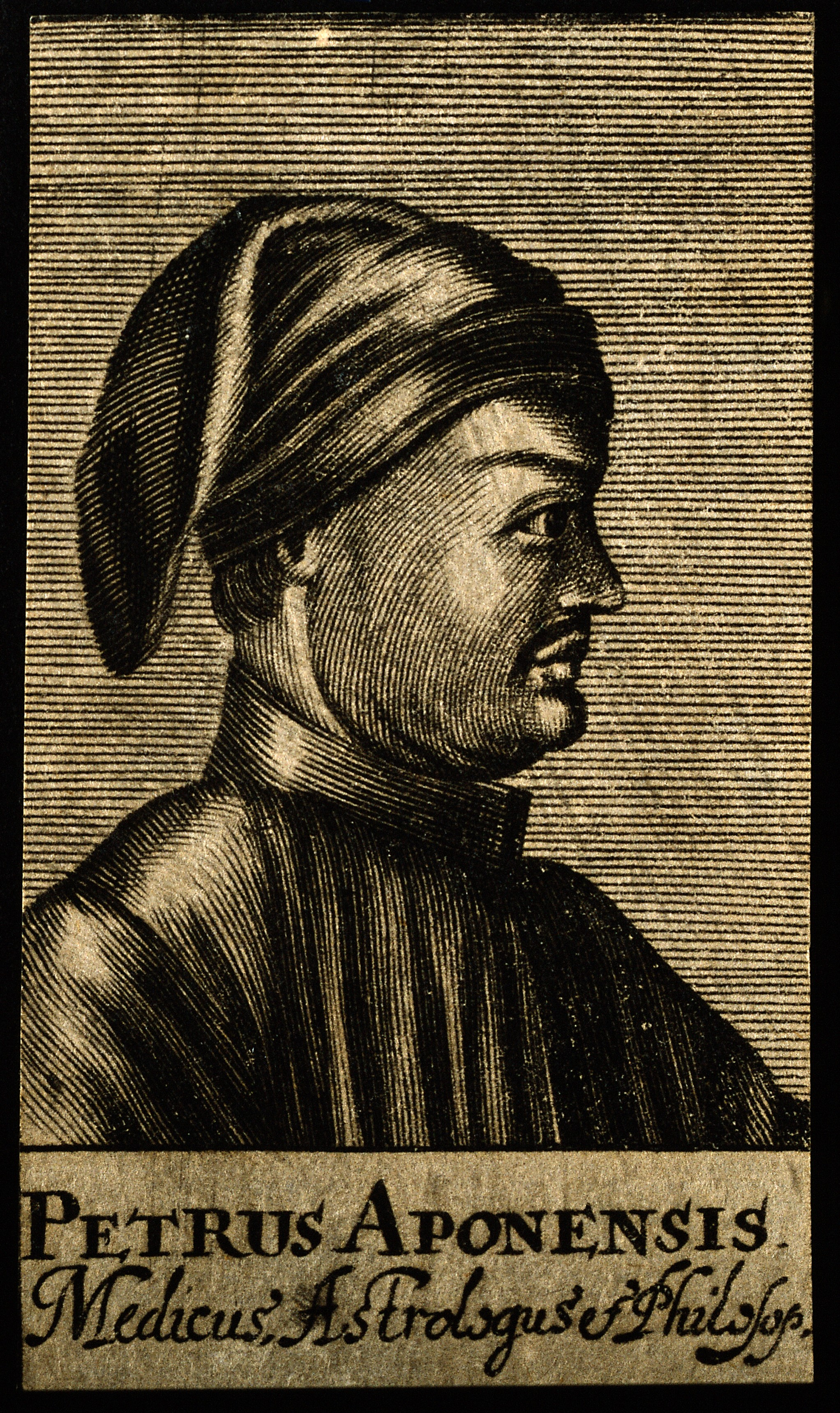
Petrus de Abano. Line engraving, 1688.

Most of d'Abano's studies were on the healing arts and the superstitions surrounding them. He believed that only physical matter could interact with a person's body as it was also made of matter. Therefore things that are immaterial or had no way to interact directly with a patient would have no physical effect on the patient. This led to him consistently refuting the interference of God, prayer, angels, demons, charms, and incantations in acts of healing. This did not prevent him however, from studying why they appeared to work. He was also an avid believer in astral magic, often referring to the celestial bodies when working with medicine

One of his studies was on the actual source of healing power behind healing prayers and charms. While he refuted the physical effects of these practices, he could not deny their apparent effectiveness. He argued that the actual meaning and religious symbolism behind the content for prayers and charms didn't matter. He instead stated that the source of healing came from a bond of trust between the minds/souls of the one speaking or using the charm and the one being healed. This bond of trust would then allow the recipient to be persuaded by the one saying the prayer/using the charm.

He also denied the influence of demons and the devil for illnesses and everyday life.

== Inquisition, trial and death ==
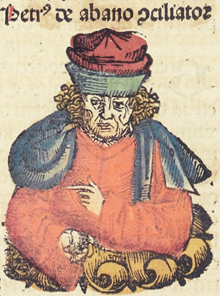
Generic portrait of Petr[us] de abano conciliator, woodcut from the Nuremberg Chronicle, 1493. The reversed "c" is a standard Latin abbreviation for the prefix "con-".

Pietro d'Abano investigated three times for alleged heresy. The first investigation was ended prematurely by the Pope. The other investigations resulted in trials, but Pietro died before the trials reached a verdict. He was found guilty however, and his body was ordered to be exhumed and burned, but a group of friends had secretly moved it from place to place finally resting in St. Augustine's Church without burial Honors. The Inquisition had to content itself with the public proclamation of its sentence and the burning of d'Abano in effigy. It was claimed that he possessed the Philosophers Stone, and that all money he paid would return to him. The effigy burning was done to hopefully discourage people from reading his writing.

He was considered a great magician of the era by many, yet it was not on the score of magic that the Inquisition sentenced Pietro to death, but rather his denial of the influence of spirits (angels and demons). This is contradictory since it was believed by authors of the time that he had 7 spirits he had contained in crystal. He instead attributed the unnatural to celestial bodies, meaning during his second trial it was not for the crime of magic but for heresy.

It is unclear exactly how Pietro d'Abano died, however it is believed that he died in 1315. From his will we know that he did have children though little is known.
