= The Book of Abramelin =

Book by Abraham of Worms

- Dover edition (1975)
- Author: uncertain
- Translator: Samuel Liddell MacGregor Mathers
- Language: likely German
- Genre: Western mysticism
- Publication date: unknown; no later than c. 1608
- English publication date: 1897
- Dewey Decimal: 133.43

The Book of Abramelin tells the story of an Egyptian mage named Abraham, or Abra-Melin, who taught a system of magic to Abraham of Worms, a Jew from Worms, Germany, presumed to have lived from c. 1362 to c. 1458. The system of magic from this book regained popularity in the 19th and 20th centuries, partly due to Samuel Liddell MacGregor Mathers's translation, The Book of the Sacred Magic of Abramelin the Mage.

The book presents an autobiography written in the form of an epistolary novel. The character of Abraham of Worms narrates his travel to the Egyptian desert and to a town bordering the Nile. An elderly Egyptian mage offers him two manuscripts containing knowledge of Kabbalistic magic, but extracts an oath that bounds Abraham in the service of God and the divine law.

The work was translated into English in 1897 by Samuel L. MacGregor Mathers and more recently in 1995 by Georg Dehn and Steven Guth. Dehn attributed authorship of The Book of Abramelin to Rabbi Yaakov Moelin (Maharil) (Hebrew יעקב בן משה מולין; c. 1365–1427), a German Jewish rabbi. This identification has since been disputed.

== Structure ==
The grimoire is framed as a sort of epistolary novel or autobiography in which Abraham of Worms describes his journey from Germany to Egypt and reveals Abramelin's magical and Kabbalistic secrets to his son Lamech. Internally the text dates itself to the year 1458.

The story involves Abraham of Worms passing his magical and Kabbalistic secrets on to his son and tells how he acquired his knowledge. Abraham recounts how he found Abramelin the Mage living in the desert outside an Egyptian town, Arachi or Araki, which borders the Nile. Abramelin's home sat atop a small hill surrounded by trees. He was an Egyptian mage and taught a powerful form of Kabbalistic magic to Abraham. He was a "venerable aged man", and very courteous and kind. He discussed nothing but the "Fear of God", the importance of leading a well-regulated life, and the evils of the "acquisition of riches and goods".

Abramelin extracted a promise from Abraham that he would give up his "false dogmas" and live "in the Way and Law of the Lord." He then gave Abraham two manuscript books to copy for himself, asking for ten gold florins, which he took with the intention of distributing to seventy-two poor persons in Arachi. Upon his return fifteen days later, after having disposed of the payment money, Abramelin extracted an oath from Abraham to "serve and fear" the Lord, and to "live and die in His most Holy Law." After this, Abramelin gave Abraham the "Divine Science" and "True Magic" embedded within the two manuscripts, which he was to follow and give to only those whom he knew well.

== Origin and manuscript sources ==
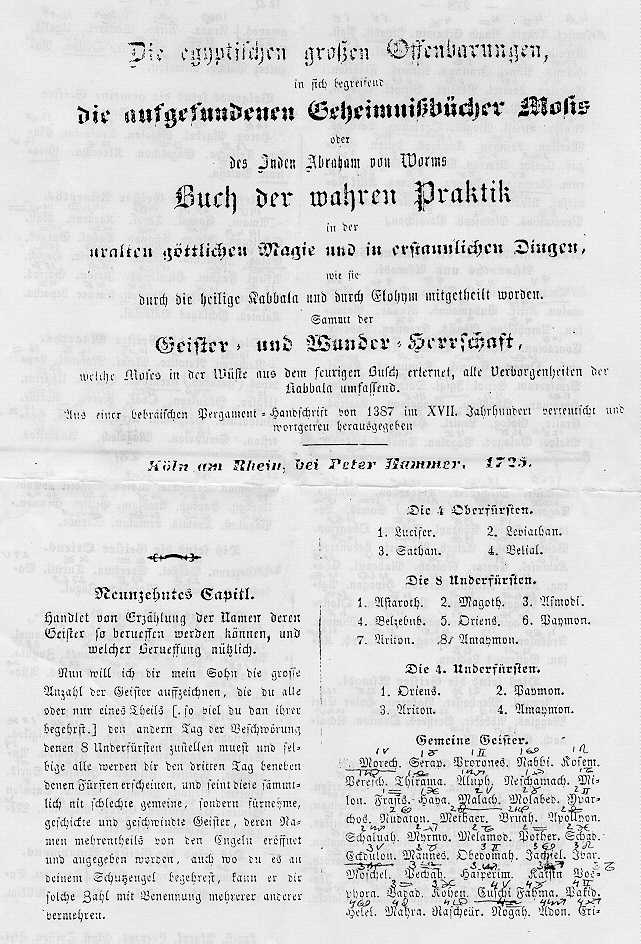
The 1725 Hammer edition, first printed version

The book exists in the form of twelve manuscripts and an early printed edition. The provenance of the text has not been definitively identified. The earliest manuscripts are two versions that date from about 1608, are written in German and are now found in Wolfenbüttel. (Note: Abraham eines Juden von Worms untereinander versteckte zum Theil aus der Kabala and Magia gezogene, zum Theil durch vornehme Rabbiner als Arabern un anderen so wie auch von seinem Vater Simon erhaltene, nachgehend, aber meisten Theils selbst erfahrene un probirte, in diese nachfolgende Schrift verfaste und endlich an seinen jüngeren Sohn Lamech hinterllaßene Künste: so geschehen ud geschrieben circa Annum 1404. Wolfenbüttel Library, Codex Guelfibus 10.1.) (Note: Abraham ben Simon bar Juda ben Simon. Das Buch der wahren praktik von der alten Magia. Anno 1608. Wolfenbüttel Library, Codex Guelfibus 47.13.) Another two manuscripts are in Dresden, and date from about 1700 and 1750 respectively. (Note: Cabala Mystica Aegyptiorum et Patriarchum. Anonymous. Staxon State and University Library, Dresden. MS N 161.) (Note: Magia Abraham oder Underricht von der Heiligen Cabala. Signatur TS. Saxon State and University Library, Dresden. MS M 111.)

The first printed version, also in German, dates to 1725 and was printed in Cologne by Peter Hammer. A partial copy in Hebrew is found in the Bodleian Library in Oxford, and dates from around 1740. (Note: Sefer Segullot Melachim. Anonymous. Oxford University, Bodleian Library. MS. OPP.594.) An 18th-century manuscript copy exists in French in the Bibliothèque de l'Arsenal in Paris. Another 17th-century manuscript in Italian exists in the 'Legato Martinengo' of the Queriniana Library in Brescia, Italy. It was part of the collection of the Count and Qabbalist Leopardo Martinengo of Barco and Torre Pallavicina. The manuscript, unknown for centuries to international researchers until 2009, has been found by academic researcher Maria Elena Loda in the esoteric section. At the moment, it is the only known manuscript translation in the Italian language of the Abramelin grimoire.

All German copies of the text consist of four books: an autobiographical account of the travels of Abraham of Worms to Egypt, a book of assorted materials from the corpus of the practical Kabbalah (including some which are duplicated in the German-Jewish grimoire called the Sixth and Seventh Books of Moses) and the two books of magic given by Abramelin to Abraham. The well-known English translation by S. L. MacGregor Mathers from the French manuscript in Paris contains only three of the four books. The ritual as described in the Mathers manuscript lasts six months. Newer compilations and translations contain all four books, and describe a duration of 18 months for completing the ritual. The Hebrew version in Oxford is limited to Book One, without reference to the further books.

Of all the extant sources, the German manuscripts in Wolfenbüttel and Dresden are taken by scholars to be the authoritative texts. According to respected Kabbalah scholar Gershom Scholem, the Hebrew version in Oxford was translated into Hebrew from German. An analysis of the spelling and language usage in the French manuscript indicates that it dates to the 18th century and that it was also likely copied from a German original. Although the author quotes from the Jewish Book of Psalms, the version given is not from the Hebrew; rather, it is from the Latin Vulgate, a translation of the Bible employed by Roman Catholics at that time.

The German esoteric scholar Georg Dehn has argued that the author was Rabbi Yaakov Moelin (Hebrew: יעקב בן משה מולין; ca. 1365–1427), a German Jewish Talmudist and posek (authority on Jewish law).

== Practical magic and ritual ==
The practical magic described in The Book of Abramelin involves a detailed ritual lasting six to eighteen months, depending on the version. This ritual is designed to achieve communion with one's Holy Guardian Angel and involves strict purity practices, prayer, and the use of magic word squares.

=== Magic word squares ===
The practical magic of Abramelin (found in both Book III of the French text, and Book IV of the German original) centres around a set of talismans composed of magic word squares. These are similar to traditional magic squares, though the latter are usually composed of numbers, while Abramelin's squares contain letters. Commonly word squares are used as puzzles or as teaching aids for students. In the context of Abramelin, the focus becomes mystical—so that each square should contain words or names that relate to the magical goal of the square. A parallel is found in the famous Sator Arepo Tenet Opera Rotas word square, an altered version of which is also found among Abramelin's squares.

For example, a square entitled "To walk underwater for as long as you want" contains the word MAIAM (מים), the Hebrew word for "water". A square for recovering treasures of jewelry begins with the word TIPHARAH (תפארה, a variant of Tiferet), which can mean "golden ring" in Hebrew and is also the name of the sphere of "Beauty" (which has the planetary attribution of the Sun) on the Kabbalistic tree of life.

== Influence and legacy ==
The Book of Abramelin has had a significant influence on Western esotericism, particularly on the practices of the Hermetic Order of the Golden Dawn and Aleister Crowley. Crowley’s engagement with the Abramelin operation is documented in his autobiographical works, where he describes his attempts to perform the ritual and its impact on his magical practices.

== Translations ==
In 1897, The Book of the Sacred Magic of Abramelin the Mage was translated into English by the British occultist Samuel L. MacGregor Mathers from a 15th-century French version of the manuscript. This translation contains three of the four books. The magic described in the grimoire significantly influenced the Hermetic Order of the Golden Dawn, an organization Mathers co-founded.

In 2006, Georg Dehn edited and published The Book of Abramelin: A New Translation, which includes all four books and is based on the original German sources. This edition provides a more complete and accurate representation of the text.

== See also ==
- Bornless Ritual – Ritual of Western ceremonial magic
- Ceremonial magic – Variety of rituals of magic
- A Dark Song a movie about the ritual
- Goetia (magic) – Invocation of demons
- Magic (supernatural) § Baroque period
- Renaissance magic – Magical science during the Renaissance
