= Pseudo-Albertus =

Pseudo-Albertus or Pseudo-Albert is a term referring to the authors of works falsely ascribed to Albertus Magnus (Albert the Great). Such works include:

- Secreta mulierum
- Semita recta
- Expositio in Apocalypsim
- Two works printed together under the title Liber aggregationis:
  - De virtutibus (fully Liber de virtutibus herbarum, lapidum, et animalium), also called Experimenta Alberti or Secreta Alberti
  - De mirabilibus mundi
- Grand Albert, a collection of magical texts centred on the Liber aggregationis
- Petit Albert, an abridgement of the Grand Albert
