= Book of Secrets =

Book of Secrets may refer to:

== Film and television ==
- National Treasure: Book of Secrets, a 2007 American film
- America's Book of Secrets, an American television series
- "Book of Secrets" (L.A.'s Finest), a 2019 television episode

== Literature ==
- Books of secrets, compilations of technical and medicinal recipes and magic formulae that began to be printed in the 16th century and were published continuously down to the 18th century
- Book of Secrets (Syriac), a Syriac treatise which survives in a single manuscript copied in the 13th century
- The Book of Secrets (novel), a 1994 novel by M. G. Vassanji
- Sefer HaRazim (Book of Secrets), a Jewish magical text supposedly given to Noah by the angel Raziel, and passed down throughout biblical history until it ended up in the possession of Solomon
- Book of Mysteries, also known as The Book of Secrets, an ancient Essene text found in fragmentary form among the Dead Sea Scrolls
- Book of Mysteries (Manichaeism), also known as The Book of Secrets, one of the Seven Scriptures of Manichaeism
- Grand Albert, also known as the Book of Secrets, a grimoire that has often been attributed to Albertus Magnus
- The Book of Secrets, a book series by Rajneesh
- Kitāb al-Asrār (Book of Secrets), a 10th-century book by Abu Bakr al-Razi

== Music ==
- Book of Secrets (album), a 1998 album by Balance of Power
- The Book of Secrets (album), a 1997 album by Loreena McKennitt

== See also ==
- Liber Secretorum (disambiguation)
- The Secret Book, a 2006 Macedonian film
