= Popular science =

Interpretation of science intended for a general audience

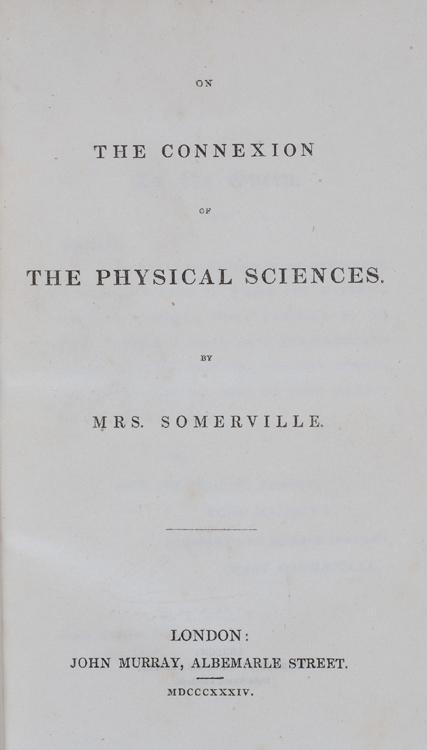
Title page of Mary Somerville's On the Connexion of the Physical Sciences (1834), an early popular-science book

Popular science is an interpretation or presentation of science intended for a general audience. Works of popular science may take many forms, including books, film and television documentaries, magazine articles, and web pages.

Popular science may be written by scientists themselves or by professional journalists. While science journalism focuses specifically on recent scientific developments, popular science is more broad-ranging.

== History ==
Before the modern specialization and professionalization of science, there was often little distinction between "science" and "popular science", and works intended to share scientific knowledge with a general reader existed as far back as Greek and Roman antiquity. Without these popular works, much of the scientific knowledge of the era might have been lost. For example, none of the original works of the Greek astronomer Eudoxus (4th century BC) have survived, but his contributions were largely preserved due to the didactic poem Phenomena written a century later and commented on by Hipparchus. Explaining science in poetic form was not uncommon, and as recently as 1791, Erasmus Darwin wrote The Botanic Garden, two long poems intended to interest and educate readers in botany. Many Greek and Roman scientific handbooks were written for the lay audience, and this "handbook" tradition continued right through to the invention of the printing press, with much later examples including books of secrets such as Giambattista Della Porta's Magia Naturalis (1558) and Isabella Cortese's Secreti (1561).

The 17th century saw the beginnings of the modern scientific revolution and the consequent need for explicit popular science writing. Although works such as Galileo's The Assayer (1632) and Robert Hooke's Micrographia (1665) were read by both scientists and the public, Newton's Principia (1687) was incomprehensible for most readers, so popularizations of Newton's ideas soon followed. Popular science writing surged in countries such as France, where books such as Fontenelle's Conversations on the Plurality of Worlds (1686) were best-sellers.

The 18th century saw increasing professionalism in science and a separation of academic science into special disciples. This created gap between experts and lay readers which popular science writing attempted to bridge.

By 1830, astronomer John Herschel had recognized the need for the specific genre of popular science. In a letter to philosopher William Whewell, he wrote that the general public needed "digests of what is actually known in each particular branch of science... to give a connected view of what has been done, and what remains to be accomplished." Indeed, as the British population became not just increasingly literate but also well-educated, there was growing demand for science titles. Mary Somerville became an early and highly successful science writer of the nineteenth century. Her On the Connexion of the Physical Sciences (1834), intended for the mass audience, sold quite well. Arguably one of the first books in modern popular science, it contained few diagrams and very little mathematics. Ten editions of the book were published, and it was translated into multiple languages. It was the most popular science title from the publisher John Murray until On the Origin of Species (1859) by Charles Darwin.

The discoveries of the early 20th century widened the gap between scientists and public understanding. With World War II and the rise of the military-industrial complex, mistrust of science grew, leading to many efforts like science museums to spread science knowledge more broadly.

Popular science publications dramatically expanded beginning in the 1970s. For example, the circulation of Scientific American grew from 425,000 to 715,000 between 1970 and 1984. Many new magazines devoted to popular science appeared during this era, including Omni, Discover, and Physics Today.

== Role ==
Popular science is a bridge between scientific literature as a professional medium of scientific research, and the realms of popular political and cultural discourse. The goal of the genre is often to capture the methods and accuracy of science while making the language more accessible. Many science-related controversies are discussed in popular science books and publications, such as the long-running debates over biological determinism and the biological components of intelligence, stirred by popular books such as The Mismeasure of Man and The Bell Curve.

The purpose of scientific literature is to inform and persuade peers regarding the validity of observations and conclusions and the forensic efficacy of methods. Popular science attempts to inform and convince scientific outsiders (sometimes along with scientists in other fields) of the significance of data and conclusions and to celebrate the results. Statements in the scientific literature are often qualified and tentative, emphasizing that new observations and results are consistent with and similar to established knowledge wherein qualified scientists are assumed to recognize the relevance. By contrast, popular science emphasizes uniqueness and generality, taking a tone of factual authority absent from the scientific literature.

== Common threads ==
Some usual features of popular science productions include:

- Entertainment value or personal relevance to the audience
- Emphasis on uniqueness and radicalness
- Exploring ideas overlooked by specialists or falling outside established disciplines
- Generalized, simplified science concepts
- Presented for an audience with little or no science background, hence explaining general concepts more thoroughly
- Synthesis of new ideas that cross multiple fields and offer new applications in other academic specialties
- Use of metaphors and analogies to explain difficult or abstract scientific concepts

== Pop sci ==
The term "popular science" appears in a shortened form as pop science or pop sci, but some science communicators use the shortened forms with a different meaning. Steven Pinker, a Harvard professor and author of several popular science books, distances himself from the term "pop science" while embracing popular science writing as part of his work as a scholar. Eduard Kaeser describes "pop science" as a kitsch form of popular science writing, that pushes science popularization towards the spectacular and superficial aspects.

== Criticism ==
Comparisons between original scientific reports, derivative science journalism, and popular science typically reveals at least some level of distortion and oversimplification.

== See also ==
- Citizen science – Amateur scientific research
- Kalinga Prize – UNESCO science award
- List of science museums
- List of science communicators
- List of popular science mass media outlets
- Nature documentary – Documentary genre
- Popular Mechanics – American science magazine
- Popular psychology – Simplified everyday psychology
- Public awareness of science – Aspect of education and communication
- Scientific celebrity – Scientists well-known to the public
- Science communication – Public communication of science-related topics to non-experts
- Science & Entertainment Exchange – Science education
- Science museum – Museum focused on science topics
- Science by press conference – Aspect of science news
- Science outreach – Public relations by scientific organizations
- Physics outreach – Broadening awareness and understanding of physics
- Sense about Science – British non-profit organisation
- TED (conference) – American-Canadian organization of conferences
