= Pietro Leggiadri Gallani =

Italian politician (1762–1825)

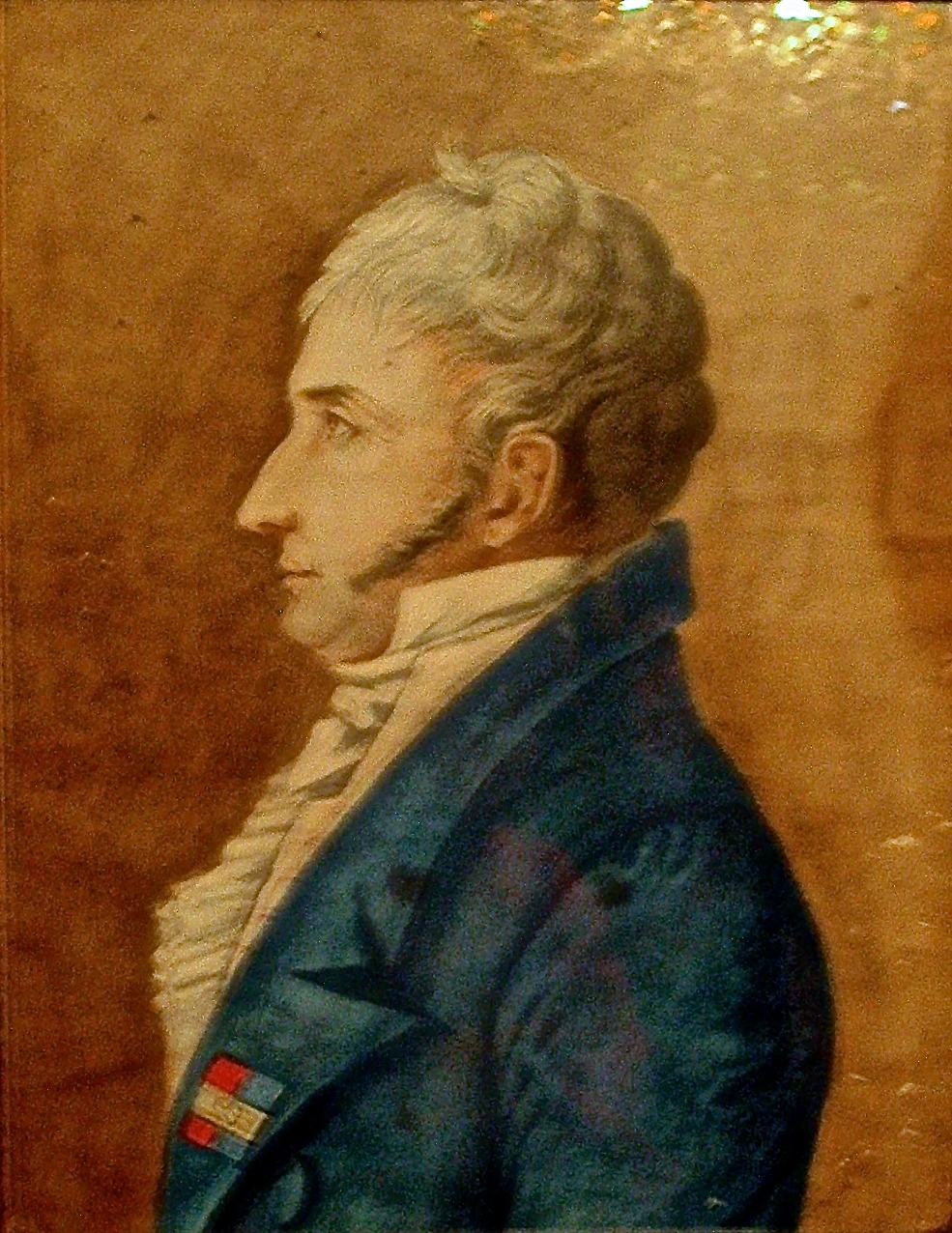
Pietro Andrea Leggiadri Gallani, Portrait in Family's Possession

Pietro Leggiadri Gallani (25 September 1762 – 7 November 1825) was a politician and official in the Duchy of Parma during four administrations, the rules of Duke Ferdinand Bourbon (1765-1802), the French administration (1802-1808), French occupation of Jean-Jacques-Regis de Cambaceres (1808-1814) and Duchess Marie Loiuse (1814-1847).

He was the 5th great grandson of Giuseppe Leggiadri Gallani, the Parmesan poet and dramatist (1516-1590).

Pietro Andrea was born on 25 September 1762 of Paolo Leggiadri Gallani and Maria Fiorenza Vedrotti, named after his maternal grandfather, Pier Andrea Vedrotti.

== Travel ==
It is stated in many biographies, mainly that in "Dizionario Biografico dei Parmigiani" etc, see below, that he was "a man endowed with great qualities of intellect, honesty and activity". He improved his mind as a young man travelling in the greater part of Europe including all of Italy, Malta, Great Britain, Holland, Germany, Spain and Portugal. Many of the artefacts he collected during his travels were contributed to the Palatine museum in Parma. In 1803 he met writer Michele Colombo in London. In this year Napoleon closed the English Channel so they, together with some other compatriots, travelled to Scotland thence to Denmark and Sweden and eventually to Parma. Colombo however returned to Paris.

== Career ==
He had attained the rank of 2nd lieutenant of artillery in 1783 and entered upon a rapid and shining career. In 1786 he was appointed to the ducal bodyguard. 5 years later (1788) he was nominated riding master of the "camp" of Don Ferdinando (Duke of Parma from 1765 to 1802).

His grandfather, Giovanni Leggiadri Gallani, had been elevated to the nobility by Fillipo Bourbon Duke of Parma in 1752 and in 1790 Pietro acquired from Count Giuseppe Camuti the feu of Belvedere comprising the Tower of Rusino (it), Madurera (Tizzano), Moragnano, Musiara etc and in this way became acknowledged Count of Belvedere (13/04/1790).

In 1792 he was nominated major duomo to Duke Ferdinand of Bourbon. In 1809 he became "Maire" of Parma (at the time of the French occupation), first serving as deputy.

Between 1814 and 1815 he was Podesta of Parma, retiring on 05/03/1815 on promotion to Counsellor of State.

He remained a Counsellor of State until his death.

In 1818 he was appointed President of the Council of Census.

== Villa ==
Between 1810 and 1820 Pietro had constructed a villa in Fraore on a considerable area of land that the family had acquired over the years.

The villa, originally referred to as Villa Leggiadri Gallani became Villa Panizzi. (See "Le Ville Parmensi") and in the early 2000s had badly deteriorated. Following sale to a new owner the villa (now renamed Villa Leggiadri-Gallani) was restored by Architects Fabio Corrradi, work starting in 2013.

== Honours ==
His honours and appointments were as follows:

- 10/09/1810 - Nominated President of the Assembly of San Donato.
- 30/06/1811 - Nominated member of the Legion of Honour
- 1812 - President of the Electoral College of the district of Parma convened in 1812
- 1813 Cavaliere of the Imperial Order of Riunione (Order abolished with the fall of the Napoleonic Empire in 1815).
- Member of the Noble Philharmonic Academy of Parma
- 11/02/1813 - Nominated Rector of the Academy of Fine Arts of Parma
- In 1814 he became honorary President of the University of Parma.
- In 1817 he was created a member of the Legion of Honour (at the time of Marie Loiuse). See also 1811.
- 11/12/1818 - Elected Cavalier of the Order of Constantine.
- 17/03/1821 - Member of the Tribunal of Counts.

== Marriage ==
He married Countess Amalia Simonetta on 08/09/1806 when he was 43 and she 20. [As evidenced by entry number 1295 in the alphabetical list of entries in the Parma State Archives "Atti di Matrimonie" and the actual marriage entry (nr 110 - in French). Antonio Cerati the philologist and writer wrote an epistle on the occasion of the marriage. He and Amalia Simonetta had 10 children. Giuseppe 09/07/1807, Maria 02/03/1809, Paolo 19/06/1810, Tullo 29/09/1811, Adelaide 20/01/1813, Luiga 07/03/1814, Paola 18/02/1815 Paolo 20/08/1817, Giuseppe 20/09/1818 and Teresa 29/09/1823.

Of the 5 survivors 3 were boys, Tullo, Paolo and Giuseppe and 2 girls Adelaide and Teresa. The first Giuseppe died at the age of 8 on 04/07/1815.

== Death ==
He died on 07/11/1825, aged 63, only 2 years after the birth of his last daughter, Teresa in 1823, and his funeral service was held at the church of San Benedetto in Parma. Chiesa di San Benedetto (Parma) After his death, his widow commissioned a marble plaque with a latin inscription executed by Don Ramiro Tonani. It was erected on a wall of the church but was apparently lost when the church was damaged during the second world war.

The new Viletta cemetery was constructed between 1817 and 1823, Napoleon having decreed that people were not to be buried in churches. Pietro was in fact buried in the "Capella" of the "Ordine Constantiniano di San Giorgio" in the South Gallery of La Viletta. The Villetta archives state that he was buried there on 09/11/1825. it:Gazetta di Parma 15 Nov 1825.

His death certificate states that he died at Nr 7 Borgo delle Colonne. The book " Palazzi & Casate di Parma" states that Pietro and his family lived in 5 Borgo Colonne (Casa Hotz) in central Parma. This appears to be incorrect since the census records all indicate that the family lived at 7 Borgo Colonne. His will was made on 13 February 1825 leaving his estate to his wife and 3 sons.

The census of 1809 indicates Pietro aged 45 and Amalia aged 22 living in 7, Borgo Colonne with their son Giuseppe aged 1, together with Pietro's father Giuseppe and mother Maddalena. The census of 1828 indicates the widowed Amalia living in 7, Borgo Colonne with three of her children, Tullo (16), Adelaide (15) and Paolo (10). The census of 1829 indicates the widow Amalia living in 7, Borgo Colonne with two of her children, Tullo (17) and Paolo (11). The census of 1830 indicates the widowed Amalia aged 42 living in 7, Borgo Colonne with two of her children, Tullo (19) and Paolo (12). The census of 1831 indicates the widowed Amalia aged 43 living in 7, Borgo Colonne with three of her children, Tullo (20), and Paolo (12).

On the East side of Parma there is a street named after him: "Via Pietro Leggiadri Gallani - Uomo Di Stato".
