= Liber Secretorum =

Liber Secretorum (Latin for 'book of secrets') may refer to:

- Liber Secretorum Fidelium Crucis by Marino Sanudo Torsello
- Liber Secretorum Eventuum by Jean de Roquetaillade
- Liber Secretorum Alberti Magni, another name for the Grand Albert

== See also ==
- Book of Secrets (disambiguation)
