= Hand of Glory =

Dried and pickled hand of a hanged man

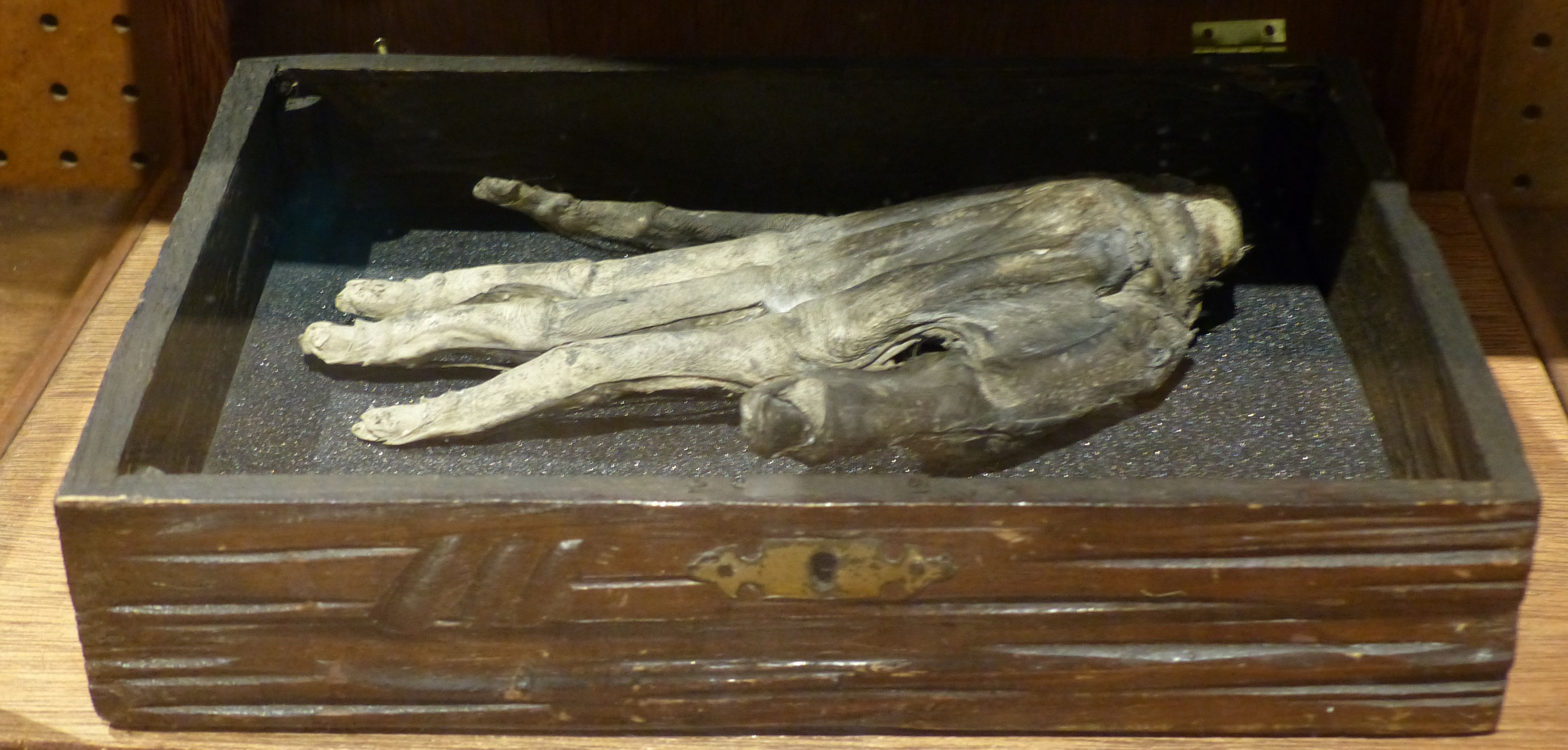
A hand of glory on display at Whitby Museum

A Hand of Glory is the dried and pickled hand of a hanged man, often specified as being the left (Latin: sinister) hand, or, if the person was hanged for murder, the hand that "did the deed."

Old European beliefs attribute great powers to a Hand of Glory. The process for preparing the hand and the candle used with it are described in 18th-century documents, with certain steps disputed due to difficulty in properly translating phrases from that era. The concept has inspired short stories and poems since the 19th century.

== History of the term ==
Etymologist Walter Skeat reports that, while folklore has long attributed mystical powers to a dead man's hand, the specific phrase Hand of Glory is in fact a folk etymology: it derives from the French main de gloire, a corruption of mandragore, which is to say mandrake. Skeat writes, "The identification of the hand of glory with the mandrake is clinched by the statement in Cockayne's Leechdoms, i. 245, that the mandrake 'shineth by night altogether like a lamp'". Cockayne in turn is quoting Pseudo-Apuleius, in a translation of a Saxon manuscript of his Herbarium.

== Powers attributed ==
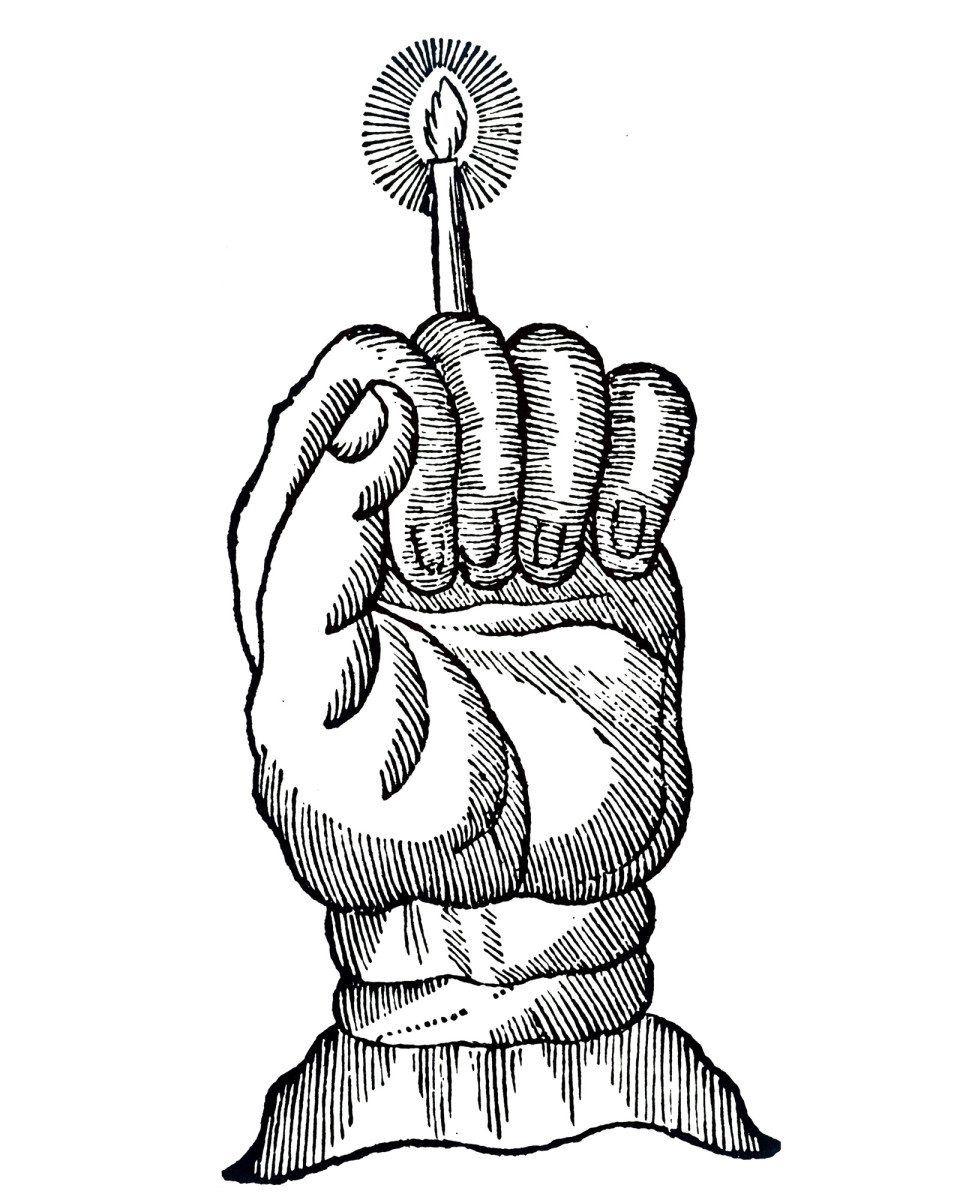
A hand of glory holding a candle, from the 18th century grimoire Petit Albert

According to old European beliefs, a candle made of the fat from a malefactor who died on the gallows, lighted, and placed (as if in a candlestick) in the Hand of Glory, which comes from the same man as the fat in the candle, would render motionless all persons to whom it was presented. The method for holding the candle is sketched in Petit Albert. The candle could be put out only with milk.

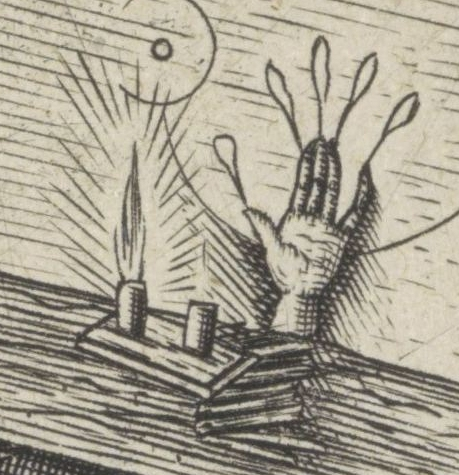
A hand of glory on a mantelpiece, in a detail of the 1565 artwork The Elder Saint Jacob Visiting the Magician Hermogenes by Pieter van der Heyden

The Hand of Glory also purportedly had the power to unlock any door it came across. The method of making a Hand of Glory is described in Petit Albert, and in the Compendium Maleficarum.

== Process ==
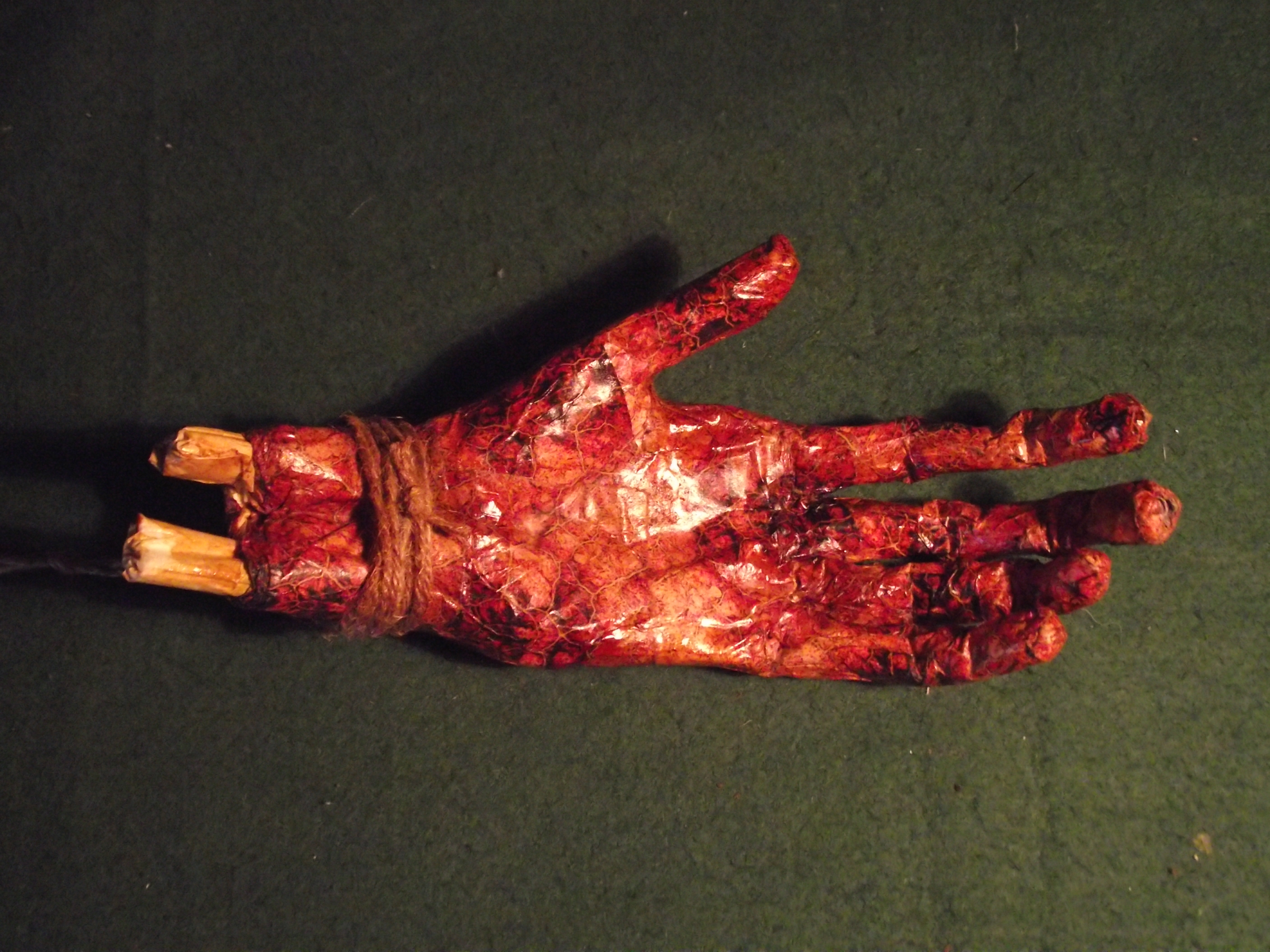
A papier-mâché hand of glory

The 1722 Petit Albert describes in detail how to make a Hand of Glory, as cited from him by Émile-Jules Grillot de Givry:

Take the right or left hand of a felon who is hanging from a gibbet beside a highway; wrap it in part of a funeral pall and so wrapped squeeze it well. Then put it into an earthenware vessel with zimat, nitre, salt and long peppers, the whole well powdered. Leave it in this vessel for a fortnight, then take it out and expose it to full sunlight during the dog-days until it becomes quite dry. If the sun is not strong enough put it in an oven with fern and vervain. Next make a kind of candle from the fat of a gibbeted felon, virgin wax, sesame, and ponie, and use the Hand of Glory as a candlestick to hold this candle when lighted, and then those in every place into which you go with this baneful instrument shall remain motionless

De Givry points out the difficulties with the meaning of the words zimat and ponie, saying it is likely "ponie" means horse-dung. De Givry is expressly using the 1722 edition, where the phrase is, according to John Livingston Lowes "du Sisame et de la Ponie" and de Givry notes that the meaning of "ponie" as "horse dung" is entirely unknown "to us", but that in local Lower Normandy dialect, it has that meaning. His reason for regarding this interpretation as "more than probable" is that horse-dung is "very combustible, when dry".

In the French 1752 edition (called Nouvelle Édition, corrigée & augmentée, i.e., "New Edition, corrected and augmented"), however, this reads as "..du sisame de Laponie..", that is, in Francis Grose's translation from 1787, "sisame of Lapland", or Lapland sesame. This interpretation can be found many places on the Internet, and even in books published at university presses. Two books, one by Cora Daniels, another by Montague Summers, perpetuate the Lapland sesame myth, while being uncertain whether zimat should mean verdigris or the Arabian sulphate of iron.

The Petit Albert also provides a way to shield a house from the effects of the Hand of Glory:

The Hand of Glory would become ineffective, and thieves would not be able to utilise it, if you were to rub the threshold or other parts of the house by which they may enter with an unguent composed of the gall of a black cat, the fat of a white hen, and the blood of the screech-owl; this substance must be compounded during the dog-days

An actual Hand of Glory is kept at the Whitby Museum in North Yorkshire, England, together with a text published in a book from 1823. In this manuscript text, the way to make the Hand of Glory is as follows:

It must be cut from the body of a criminal on the gibbet; pickled in salt, and the urine of man, woman, dog, horse and mare; smoked with herbs and hay for a month; hung on an oak tree for three nights running, then laid at a crossroads, then hung on a church door for one night while the maker keeps watch in the porch-"and if it be that no fear hath driven you forth from the porch ... then the hand be true won, and it be yours"

== Pop culture ==
In J. K. Rowling's Harry Potter and the Chamber of Secrets (1998), a hand of glory is seen on display in Borgin and Burke's, credited with producing candlelight which only the holder can see. It is later used by Draco Malfoy in Harry Potter and the Half-Blood Prince (2005), in combination with magical smoke bombs, to cause complete darkness for his enemies.

In Cassandra Clare's Lady Midnight (2016), the warlock Malcolm Fade tries resurrecting his late lover with a dozen hands of glory.

In Charles Stross's The Laundry Files (2004– ), the hand of glory is a common piece of equipment, depicted as causing a user to become imperceptible when the fingertips are set alight, or firing blasts of energy when a phase conjugate mirror is affixed to the base and a pre-programmed trigger phrase is concentrated upon by the user. The creation of a Hand of Glory is depicted as using the self-defence reflex of extra-dimensional parasites, and thus only requiring a nerve-dense limb. Consequently, most Hands of Glory depicted in the series are those of pigeons.

In John Bellairs' young-adult novel The House With A Clock In Its Walls, the villain Mrs. Izard constructs a hand of glory and uses it to paralyze two of the protagonists.

Middlegame features a hand of glory on the cover and in use by James Reed.

Grant Morrison's Invisibles series expands on the concept, with a Hand of Glory used in rituals to take practitioners beyond time

== See also ==
- Order of the Occult Hand
- The Monkey's Paw
