= Kitāb al-nawāmīs =

Arabic book of magic

Start of the only known surviving excerpt of the original Arabic text of the Kitāb al-nawāmīs

The Kitāb al-nawāmīs is an Arabic book of magic written in the late ninth century in a Ṣābian milieu. It falsely claims to be a work of Plato. The complete Arabic text does not survive, but a complete Latin translation of the twelfth century does, going under the title Liber vaccae or the Book of the Cow.

The work is divided into two books of 45 and 40 chapters, respectively. Each chapter contains a magical experiment or recipe, including for creating rational animals or hybrids, creating phenomena in the sky, controlling the rain or trees, acquiring wisdom, influencing the sense of vision, creating inextinguishable lights, getting one's wishes granted, seeing spirits, making animals submissive, manipulating fire and making miraculous seeds and inks.

== Title ==
The original title in Arabic, Kitāb al-nawāmīs, is often translated Book of the Laws, since nawāmīs is the plural of nāmūs, an Arabic transliteration of Greek nomos (law). It was chosen so as to sound genuine, since there is an authentic work of Plato entitled Laws. The Arabic term nawāmīs, however, came to mean "secrets" and this is how it is defined in medieval dictionaries. Liana Saif suggests "book of the sacred secrets" is a better translation of Kitāb al-nawāmīs and accurately reflects its content.

In Latin translation, the book circulated under various titles. The original title of the translation was Liber aneguemis, the latter word being a mere transliteration of al-nawāmīs. This was sometimes corrupted to Liber neumich. The alternative title Libri institutionum (and variants like Liber institucionum activarum) is an attempt at translation. Other titles are taken from the work's contents. Liber tegimenti is a reference to the preface, wherein the original title (Kitāb al-nawāmīs) is said to be a tegimentum (covering) concealing the true meaning. Liber regimenti, the title found in De mirabilibus mundi, appears to be a corruption of this. Liber vaccae ('Book of the Cow'), the title chosen by Giovanni Pico della Mirandola, refers to the first experiment, which involves a cow.

== Genre ==
By medieval classifications, the Kitāb al-nawāmīs is a work of natural magic (sīmāʾ, magia naturalis) as opposed to ritual magic. That is, it is "based solely on the exploitation of the hidden forces of nature" and does not directly involve demons or other spirits.

Modern scholars have employed many terms. On account of the substances used and the end products of its experiments, it may be classed as "organic magic". Its complex procedures and focus on marvel and spectacle place it in the realm of "illusionist" rather than divinatory magic. David Pingree labels it "psychic magic" because its uses body parts and fluids which souls were believed to inhabit.

== Date and place of origin ==
The Kitāb al-nawāmīs was produced by the Ṣābians of Ḥarrān in the late ninth century. The earliest citation of it is found in a Pseudo-Jābirian work of the early tenth century. Robert Goulding suggests that second book was composed separately and added to the first early on.

The preface falsely claims that the work is Ḥunayn ibn Isḥāq's translation of Galen's synopsis of Plato's Laws. An actual translation or adaptation of Plato's Laws based on Galen's synopsis and attributed to Ḥunayn is partially extant. No fuller translation is known. The purpose of the forgery was "that their anonymous authors hoped to give additional weight to the authority of their works." The pagan religion of the Ṣābians, however, was genuinely influenced by Neoplatonism. Some words in the Arabic text are clearly transliterations of Greek words.

The ascription to Plato was considered suspect by the earliest Latin writers to comment on it, William of Auvergne (d. 1249) and Nicole Oresme (d. 1382). It was rejected outright by Pico della Mirandola, who calls the work "full of detestable dreams and nonsense ... no less alien to Plato than these dreadful things are alien to Plato's decency and wisdom."

== Synopsis ==
Start of the Liber vaccae in the Vatican manuscript

After a preface, the Kitāb al-nawāmīs is divided into two books, called maior (greater) and minor (lesser). There are 85 chapters containing approximately as many "experiments", 45 in the first book and 40 in the second. Some surviving copies lack chapter 26 and chapters 39 and 40 appear to be later additions.

The experiments are organized thematically. Sophie Page identifies ten groupings (and three isolated chapters) in the first book:

1. Chapters 1–4, experiments for creating creatures
2. Chapters 5–11, suffumigations for creating celestial marvels
3. Chapters 12–15, experiments for influencing the rain
4. Chapters 16–20, experiments for "how to adapt houses so that they have marvelous appearances or so that those who enter them have marvelous experiences"
5. Chapters 21–23, experiments for making trees animate
6. Chapters 24–26, experiments for acquiring wisdom and secret knowledge
  Chapter 27, an isolated experiment for creating a hybrid creature
7. Chapters 28–31, recipes for lotions to influence the eyesight of the experimenter or others
  Chapter 32 lacks an experiment, but describes the original possessors of nawāmīs as engaged in the worship of heavenly bodies
8. Chapters 33–36, experiments for creating inextinguishable lights
9. Chapters 37–41, experiments for creating happiness and getting one's wishes
10. Chapters 41–44, recipes for lotions to allow one to see spirits, including demons
  Chapter 45, a suffumigation for making animals submissive

While the first book concerns control over rational and animal life and contact with spirits, the second is "more modest domestic magic or parlour tricks ... to provoke wonder and provide entertainment." The experiments in the second book mostly concern fire and its maniuplation (such as candles that create optical illusions), although chapters 1–3 and 28–30 are about marvellous seeds and inks, respectively.

== Reception and interpretation ==
The Kitāb al-nawāmīs does not give any reasons or bases for its experiments. It is lacking in "articulate description of its theoretical foundations". The earliest work to attempt an explanation is the Ghāyat al-ḥakīm, an anonymous twelfth-century book of magic. After summarizing the contents of the first book of the Kitāb al-nawāmīs, it explains that the magic works "by means of the effects of images, the employment of spiritual powers, and the implanting of their powers in the motionless forms which consist of elemental substances so that they become moving spiritual (forms) producing marvellous effects." According to David Pingree, the idea is that souls can be implanted in physical bodies allowing them to move. The effects produced will depend on the kinds of soul and body so combined. This underlying principle is derived from a statement in Plato's actual Laws, which is cited in the preface to the Kitāb al-nawāmīs, that the soul "is the cause of change and of all motion for all things".

The closest Arabic text to the Kitāb al-nawāmīs is the ʿUyūn al-ḥaqāʾiq wa iḍāh al-tarāʾiq ('sources of truths and explications of paths'), written by the alchemist Abū al-Qāsim al-ʿIrāqī in the thirteenth century. It contains 26 chapters that correspond to chapters in the Kitāb al-nawāmīs.

As a work of natural magic, the Kitāb al-nawāmīs avoided standard Christian objections to magic as demonic. Nevertheless, it was generally received negatively in the West. William of Auvergne, without rejecting to the efficacy of the magic, objected to its aims. The "laws of Plato" (leges Platonis) were contrary to the laws of nature. Nicole Oresme expressed similar views, although he objected specifically to the use of sperm, poisons and other "abominable mixtures" in magic, while the use of stone and plant matter was acceptable. The anonymous author of De mirabilibus mundi, however, had a high opinion of the Kitāb.

== Translations, manuscripts and editions ==
The Arabic text is only partially preserved. A single short fragment of three pages can be found at the end of manuscript Arabe 2577 in Paris, Bibliothèque nationale de France. It contains just three suffumigations. A fragment not much longer was reported by Paul Kraus from a manuscript privately held by the al-Ḥanjī family of Cairo. Its whereabouts are currently unknown. The Paris text was printed Abessattar Chaouech in 2006. A new edition with English translation was published in 2023.

The Kitāb al-nawāmīs is known primarily through a Latin translation made in Spain in the late twelfth century. The identity of the translator is unknown. The earliest citation of the Latin is from William of Auvergne in the 1220s. By the 1240s, a copy was in the library of Richard of Fournival.

There are 14 complete or partial manuscripts of the Latin version, all from between around 1200 and 1500. The oldest complete copy is CLM 22292 in the Bavarian State Library in Munich, from around 1200. One Latin manuscript—II.iii.214 of the Biblioteca Nazionale in Florence—has been printed. David Pingree was preparing an edition of the Latin text at the time of his death in 2005. His papers passed to the American Philosophical Society and the edition has not been published.

The Latin version was translated into Hebrew in the fourteenth century. The Hebrew version skips the first few experiments. There is a single manuscript of the Hebrew version, now Codex Hebraicus 214 in the Bavarian State Library.

== Works cited ==
- Arnzen, Rüdiger (2011). "Plato, Arabic". In Henrik Lagerlund (ed.). Encyclopedia of Medieval Philosophy. Springer. pp. 1012–1016. doi:10.1007/978-1-4020-9729-4_403.
- Hasse, Dag Nikolaus (2002). "Plato arabico-latinus: Philosophy – Wisdom Literature – Occult Sciences". In Stephen Gersh; Maarten J. F. M. Hoenen (eds.). The Platonic Tradition in the Middle Ages: A Doxographic Approach. De Gruyter. pp. 31–65. doi:10.1515/9783110908497.31.
- Page, Sophie (2013). Magic in the Cloister: Pious Motives, Illicit Interests, and Occult Approaches to the Medieval Universe. Penn State University Press. doi:10.1515/9780271060965.
- Page, Sophie (2023). "Censorship, maleficia, and the Medieval Readers of the Liber vaccae". In Ann Giletti; Dag Nikolaus Hasse (eds.). Mastering Nature in the Medieval Arabic and Latin Worlds: Studies in Heritage and Transfer of Arabic Science in Honour of Charles Burnett. Brepols. pp. 207–229.
- Pingree, David E. (2002). "The Ṣābians of Ḥarrān and the Classical Tradition". International Journal of the Classical Tradition. 9 (1): 8–35. JSTOR 30224282.
- Pingree, David E. (2014) [1993]. "Plato's Hermetic Book of the Cow". Transactions of the American Philosophical Society. 104 (3): 463–475. ProQuest 1636557067
- Raggetti, Lucia (2023). "Hallucinations and Smoke Screens: The Pseudo-Platonic 'Laws of Nature' (Nawāmīs) and Their Transmission". Quaderni di Studi Arabi. 18 (1–2): 354–395. doi:10.1163/2667016x-18010227. hdl:11585/958506.
- Saif, Liana (2016). "The Cows and the Bees: Arabic Sources and Parallels for Pseudo-Plato's Liber Vaccae (Kitāb al-Nawāmīs)". Journal of the Warburg and Courtauld Institutes. 79 (1): 1–47. doi:10.1086/JWCI26322518.
- Van der Lugt, Maaike (2009). "'Abominable Mixtures': The Liber vaccae in the Medieval West, or the Dangers and Attractions of Natural Magic". Traditio. 64: 229–277. JSTOR 27832095.
