= Giuseppe Leggiadri Gallani =

Italian poet and dramatist

Giuseppe Leggiadri Gallani (21 December 1516 – 1590) was an Italian poet and dramatist. He was a native of Parma in the era of the rule of the Farnese family.

== Biography ==
Giuseppe Leggiadri Gallani, Portrait in family's possession

Baptismal records of the Baptistry of Parma indicate that Giuseppe Lizardo (Joseph Lizadrus de Gallanis) was born on December 21 and baptised on December 28, 1516. His Godparents included Archbishop Jacobus de Colla, Father Dominicus de Salamonis, Don Franciscus de Bergonzus, Don Cosimeus Taiaferris, Donna Susanna Taiaferris, Donna Jacoba Cozama, Donna Gasparma de Balestris.

He was the second child of four born to Ziardo and Susanna. He was the only one baptised with a second Christian name, probably because of the recent death of his Aunt Lizarda, born on February 23, 1490. It is likely that his sister Leggiadra was also named after her aunt (Ziardo's sister). The name 'Lizadrus' italianised as 'Leggiadri' became the second family name with the children of Giuseppe and continues to this day. Other members of Ziardo and Susanna’s family just used the surname Gallani.

Although he studied to become a notary, he never practised, and took up a literary life.

Following the assassination in 1547 of the Duke of Parma, Pier Luigi Farnese, his natural successor was his son Ottavio Farnese. When, however, Pope Paul III nominated Orazio Farnese, Duke of Castro, Ottavio's brother, Giuseppe, age 33, who had been loyal to Ottavio, was forced to flee to Naples. In Naples he served various nobles so as to continue his literary activities.

In that various 'rime' are published in Venice in 1552 under the title 'Rime di diversi Illustri Signori Napoletani ...... ', could it be that he remained in Naples until this date? This would coincide with the publication of "La Guerra di Parma" (War of Parma) in 1552 in Parma.

His loyalty to Ottavio Farnese found its maximum expression in his poem "La Guerra di Parma" (War of Parma) Compendio Storico Della Guerra Di Parma, 1548-1553 which he composed shortly after the war in which Ottavio allied with the French and Pope Julius III against the Holy Roman Emperor Charles V. Ottavio Farnese was, in fact, confirmed as Duke of Parma in 1551.

Giuseppe is stated by some to have married Margherita Comina and they had 5 children, two boys, Antonio and Giovanni and 3 girls Margherita Virginia and Lucia. But his will dated April 21, 1567 states he in fact married Hieronyma de Parlasebis. They had one son, Theodoro and it is his son Giuseppe, ie the grandson of Giuseppe the poet, to whom the biographic notes refer.

Ireneo Affò in "Memorie degli Scrittori e Letterati Parmigiani" quotes d'Erba, who apparently knew the writer, described 'Giuseppe Lizardo Galano’ as "An author, writer and notary, a man talented with grand genius and of marvellous memory".

There is some uncertainty about the date of his death. Da Erba, writing in 1572 writes as if he was dead (age = 56) whereas Spreti gives his date of death as 1590 (age = 74). He was buried at the Church of San Bartolomeo. Chiesa di San Bartolomeo (Parma). Apparently there was a plaque to his memory but it was lost in the refurbishments of the church in 1785 and/or 1851.

He wrote various works including numerous "Rime", "Fillide and "Forza d'Amore" (two eclogues - short poems), "La Favola di Adone" (short narrative poem), "Il Falso"(comedy) "Dido" (tragedy), "La Portia" (comedy), "Alithea" (musical tragedy), "Un Dialogo di Pastori". His most important work was "La Guerra di Parma" (War of Parma of 1551) in which he tells in verse the history of the campaign of Ottavio Farnese against the Pope and the Emperor.

The "Rime" are published in eight collections as follows:

1. 'Rime di diversi Illustri Signori Napoletani e Altri Nobliss Intelletti' - Ludovico Dolce - Vinegia - Gabriel Giolotto de Ferrari - 1552. Contains 28 works on pages 31–45
2. 'Del Tempio alla Divina Signora Giovanna d'Aragona' - Girolamo Ruscelli - Venetia per Plino Pietrasanta - 1555. Contains one work on page 150. Giovanna d'Aragona was the sister-in-law of the poet Vittoria Colonna.
3. 'I Fiori delle Rime de Poeti Illustri' - Girolamo Ruscelli - Venetia Giovanbattista et Melchior Sessa Fratelli 1558. Contains 10 works on pages 391-397. This collection by Ruscelli also contains 32 verses by Vittoria Colonna.
4. 'I Fiori delle Rime de Poeti Illustri' - Girolamo Ruscelli - Venetia - Melchior Sessa 1569. Contains 10 works on pages 194-197.
5. 'I Fiori delle Rime de Poeti Illustri' - Girolamo Ruscelli - Venetia - Melchior Sessa 1579. Contains 10 works on pages 182-184.
6. 'I Fiori delle Rime de Poeti Illustri' - Girolamo Ruscelli - Venetia - Melchior Sessa 1586. Contains 10 works on pages 182-184.
7. 'I Fiori delle Rime de Poeti Illustri' - Girolamo Ruscelli - Terza Impressione - Salvatore e Gian-Domen Marescandoli - Lucca 1729. Contains 10 works on pages 390-396.
8. 'I Fiori delle Rime de Poeti Illustri' - - Giovanni Offredi - Vincenzo Conti Cremona 1560. Contains 4 works on pages 117-123.

There is also a sonnet included at the end of 'La Guerra di Parma'

The 'Rime' in these collections have no titles nor are they numbered. Colin Leggiadri Gallani, a descendant, has numbered the 'Rime' for convenience. The order is purely that in which they came to light and are as follows:

I - Quanto Più lunge da alma mia luce
II - Il uarcar monti e luoghi alpestri e fieri
III - Piansi gia de Sebeto a la chiar'onde
IV - Ecco, che pur de l'acerbemie pene
V - Se le lagrime mie, se i miei sospiri
VI - Tant al non son, che con le poma a fronte
VII - Vago oltrra modo, che desio contento
VIII - S'io havessi ardir cantando di dolermi
IX - Poscia, che dove a Scithi estremo gelo
X - Mentre con mormorio placido e grato
XI - Neci, se'l dolce humor, con cui si altieri
XII - Gia fa del pianto mio dolce ricetto
XIII - Superbo, alto, profondo, ondoso mare
XIV - Qui, dove preme orgoglioso le sponde
XV - Di me stesso nemico e di mia pace
XVI - Deh, perche non poss'io, come nel cuore
XVII - Mentre con l'occhio intento col pensiero
XVIII - Occhi, ch'a gli occhi miei
XVIX - Quando più giunger la natura a la'arte
XX - La, dove inonda e bagna
XXI - Scaldava il sol co chiari ardenti rai
XXII - Hor, che da gli occhi miei, non già dal cuore
XXIII - A quelle parti, oeu co raggi ardent
XXIV - Su presto greggi miei, dove n'aspetta
XXV - Fuggendo Amor, me il mio destin seguendo
XXVI - Pianse Artemisia il carosposo, e volse
XXVII - Poscia, che i miei più chiari e lieti giorni
XXVIII - Sol quel si vago et si spetato sole
XXIX - Temo donna gentil se scriver voglio
XXX - Tirsi rozzo Pastor, ritorna al luoco
XXXI - Hor che perfida scorto de suoi gigli
XXXII - Mentre di gioia privo
XXXIII - Per farmi ancor d'ogn'altro piu cotentoo

Further manuscripts of Rime attributed to Giuseppe Leggiadro Gallani and Giuseppe Leggiadro are referred to in the Biblioteca Nazionale Centrale of Florence and the Biblioteca Comunale degli Intronati of Siena (Further research required).

The comedy "La Portia" was published in Fiorenza in 1568. It was dedicated to Fabricio Baiiardi. A full copy is available on Google Books. A reprint was published 1n 1962 as an example of a 16th-century comedy.

La Guerra di Parma was originally published in four chapters. A copy is included in a book entitled Drei alte italienische Drucke der Erlanger Bibliothek by Hermann Varnhagen de:Hermann Varnhagen in the possession of the University of Erlangen Library. The work was later revised to seven chapters in 1552.

"Dido" was not published, but a manuscript copy exists in the Palatine Library in Parma entitled "Didone" not "Dido" and dedicated to Ottavio Farnese. This manuscript was part of the collection of rev Walter Sneyd of Cheverels, Herts, UK since it is listed in a catalogue of manuscripts for sale in 1833. Responding to a query by CLGallani the Palatine Library have confirmed that the copy they hold is that previously owned by Sneyd.

== Works ==
- Rime,
- Fillide and Forza d'Amore (two eclogues - short poems)
- La Favola di Adone (short narrative poem)
- Il Falso (comedy)
- Dido (tragedy)
- La Portia (comedy)
- Alithea (musical tragedy)
- Un Dialogo di Pastori
- La Guerra di Parma (The War of Parma of 1551), in which he tells in verse the history of the campaign of Octavius Farnese against the Pope and the Emperor
