= De mirabilibus mundi (Pseudo-Albert) =

De mirabilibus mundi ("On the Marvels of the World"), which also circulated under the titles De secretis naturae and Liber secretorum, is an anonymous book of natural magic written in Latin in the 13th century. Already by the end of the century some copies erroneously ascribed the work to Albert the Great, but this attribution became common only in the 15th century. De mirabilibus was later included in the anthology known as the Book of Secrets.

De mirabilibus consists of recipes or experiments (experimenta) by which one can supposedly harness occult powers in nature through a form of sympathetic magic. This involves knowledge of the powers of attraction and repulsion of natural objects, which can be obtained by reason and experience. Emphasis is placed on experimentation. The prologue espouses a popularized form of Aristotelianism and the author was also familiar with Avicenna and the Pseudo-Platonic magical Liber vaccae, from a which a good number of recipes are taken. The later recipes are mostly just "conjuring tricks" and "hallucinogenic suffumigations" drawn probably from the Book of Fires of Marcus Graecis.

An English translation first appeared in the Elizabethan Age.
