= Whitby Museum =

Museum in North Yorkshire, England

Coordinates: 54.485430°N 0.621670°W

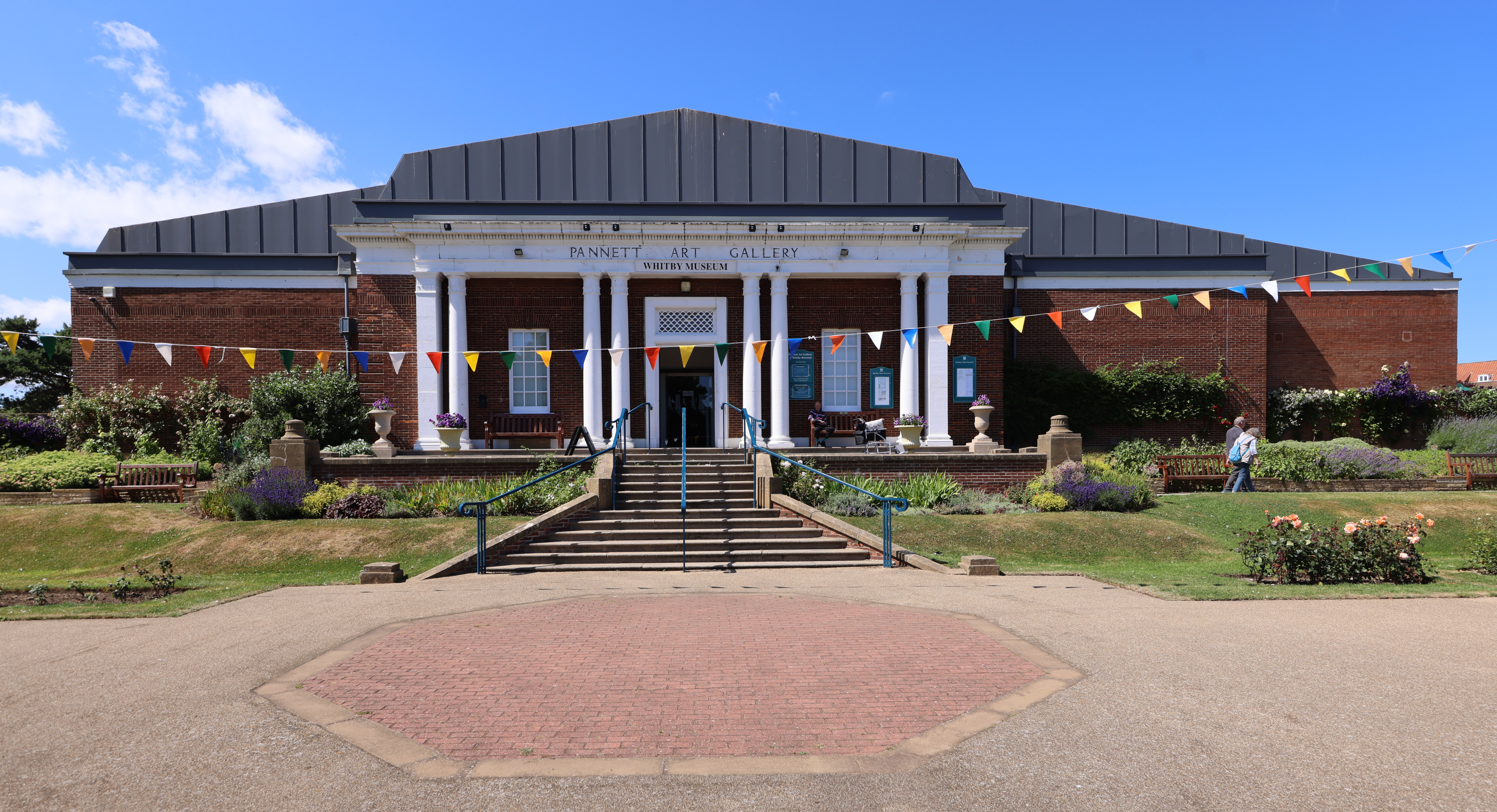
Whitby Museum

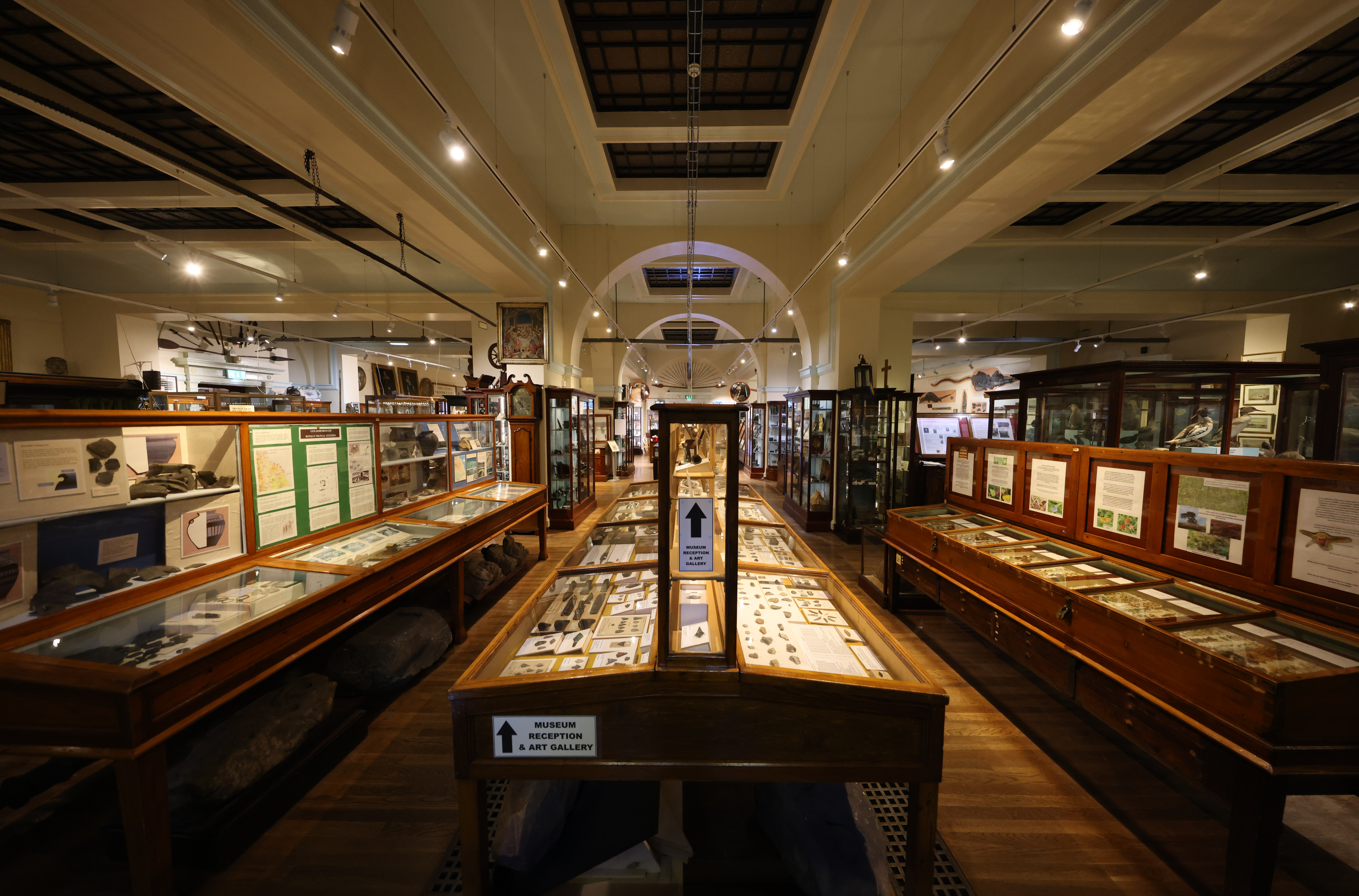
Interior of Whitby Museum

Whitby Museum is an independent museum in Whitby, North Yorkshire, England, run by Whitby Literary and Philosophical Society, a learned society and registered charity, established in 1823. The museum is located in a building opened in 1931 in Pannett Park, Whitby, which also contains the Society's Library and Archive.

== Collections ==
The museum contains a wide range of material relating to the history of Whitby, and has specialist collections relating to Jurassic fossils, in particular ammonites and marine reptiles, Whitby jet, Captain James Cook and HM Bark Endeavour, Whitby's whaling industry, and the natural history of the North Yorkshire coast and moors. In addition to this, there are costume and textiles exhibits as well as a collection of photography, including the collection and archive of the museum's former curator Frank Meadow Sutcliffe. The museum has a reference library and archive documenting the industries and social history of the town and area, which is used as a research facility. The museum also contains a Hand of Glory, the dried and pickled hand of a hanged man, said to have magical powers.

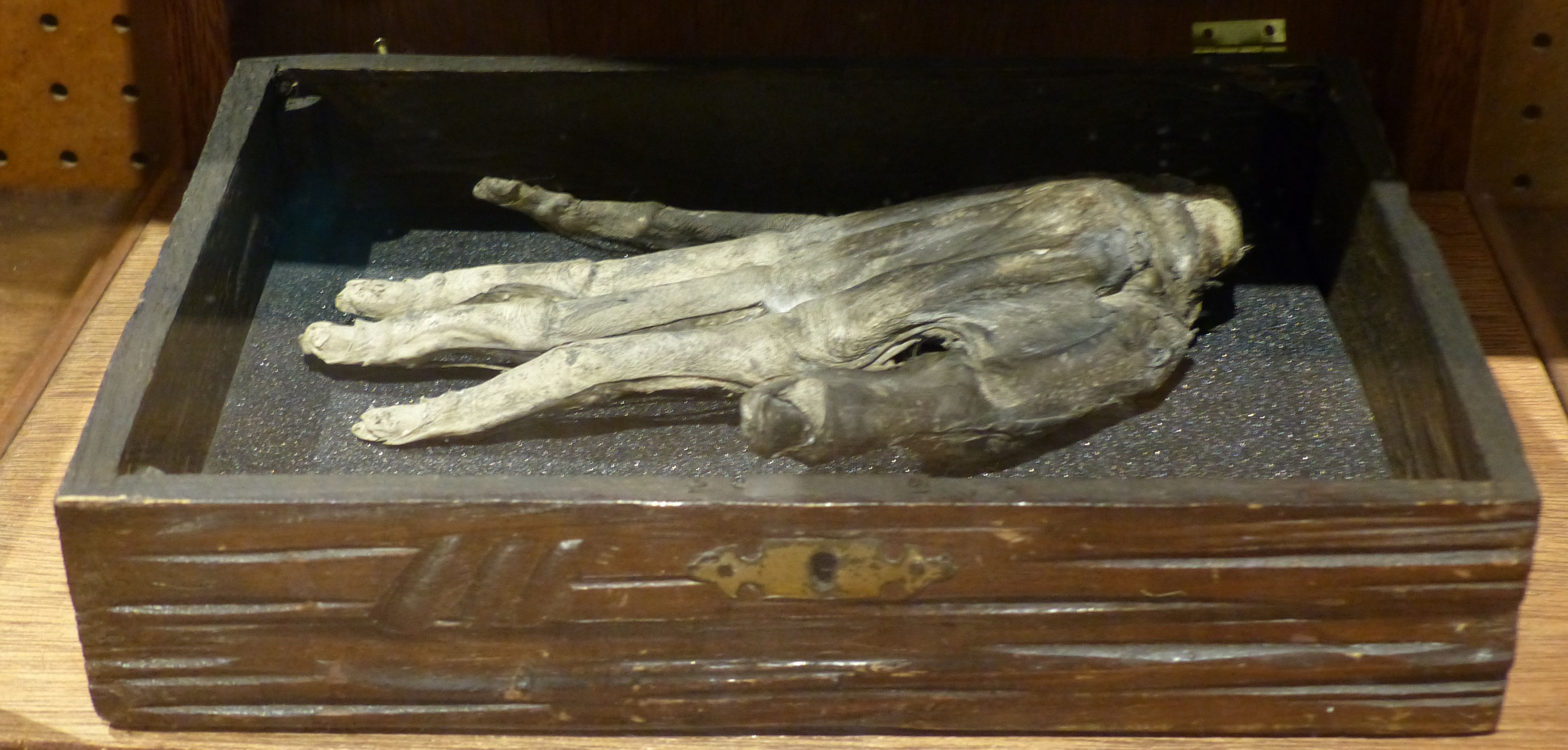
The hand of glory at the Whitby Museum

Between the 1890s and 1930 the museum collection included the mummy of an Egyptian man who had died around 300 BC. The mummy had previously been owned by Sir George Elliot, 1st Baronet and was donated to the museum on his death. The mummy was purchased for £15 by Thomas Sheppard, the then curator of the Hull Municipal Museum, in 1930 and is now at the Hands On History Museum in Kingston upon Hull.

== History ==
The museum opened in 1823, and was originally located in two small rooms above a shop on Baxtergate in Whitby. In 1827, once the collection began to overflow this space, it moved into a larger building, above the public baths. In 1924, the decision was taken to build a new building for the collection, and today's current museum building in Pannett Park was opened in August 1931.
