= Alexius Pedemontanus =

16th-century Italian physician, alchemist and author

Alessio Piemontese, also known under his Latinized name of Alexius Pedemontanus, was the pseudonym of a 16th-century Italian physician, alchemist, and author of the immensely popular book, The Secrets of Alexis of Piedmont. His book was published in more than a hundred editions and was still being reprinted in the 1790s. The work was translated into Latin, German, English, Spanish, French, and Polish. The work unleashed a torrent of 'books of secrets' that continued to be published down through the eighteenth century.

Piemontese was the prototypical 'professor of secrets'. His description of his hunt for secrets in the preface to the Secreti helped to give rise to a legend of the wandering empiric who dedicated his life to the search for natural and technological secrets. The book contributed to the emergence of the concept of science as a hunt for the secrets of nature, which pervaded experimental science during the period of the Scientific Revolution.

It is generally assumed that Alessio Piemontese was a pseudonym of Girolamo Ruscelli (Viterbo 1500 — Venice 1566), humanist and cartographer. In a later work, Ruscelli reported that the Secreti contained the experimental results of an 'Academy of Secrets' that he and a group of humanists and noblemen founded in Naples in the 1540s. Ruscelli's academy is the first recorded example of an experimental scientific society. The academy was later imitated by Giambattista Della Porta, who founded an ‘Accademia dei Secreti’ in Naples in the 1560s.

== Works ==
- De' secreti del reuerendo donno Alessio Piemontese, Venice, 1555 (Italian)

--- 1562 edition

--- Les secrets de reverend Alexis Piémontois, Anvers, 1557 (French)

--- The Secretes of the Reverende Maister Alexis of Piermont, 1558 (English, translated from the French version)

--- Kunstbuch Des Wolerfarnen Herren Alexii Pedemontani/ von mancherleyen nutzlichen unnd bewerten Secreten oder Künsten, 1616 (German)

--- Aleksego Pedemontana Tajemnice - included as a part of Herbarz to iest ziół tutecznych postronnych y zamorskich opisanie: co za moc maią a iako ich używać tak tu przestrzeżeniu zdrowia ludzkiego iako ku uzdrowieniu rozmaitych chorób: Teraz nowo wedle herbarzow dzisieyszego wieku y inych zacnych medyków poprawiony, 1568 (Polish)

== Experimental reconstruction ==
Researchers at Aalto University in 2020 followed instructions from the De Secreti to transform white fur to more expensive or desirable leopard or panther fur using litharge and quicklime. The mixture successfully produced dark spots on the fur where lead oxide is deposited on the hair.
