= Isabella Cortese =

16th-century Italian alchemist and writer

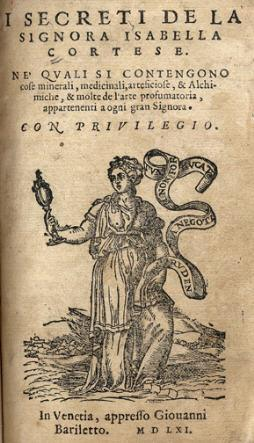
The Secrets of Lady Isabella Cortese (1561)

Isabella Cortese (fl. 1561), was an Italian alchemist and writer of the Renaissance. All that is known of her life and work is from the 1561 book on alchemy attributed to her, I secreti della signora Isabella Cortese or The Secrets of Lady Isabella Cortese.

== Education ==
Cortese claimed to have studied alchemy for thirty years, including the works of established alchemists such as Geber, Ramon Llull, and Arnold of Villanova. She was dismissive of their work, calling it "complete gibberish, filled with fables and crazy recipes that only make you lose time and money". She wrote she had gained nothing by studying their work but an "increase in the likelihood of an early death". The introduction of the manuscript claimed Cortese learned more about the field of alchemy through traveling around the globe, rather than reading older books that discuss the topic of alchemy.

== The Secrets of Lady Isabella Cortese ==
See Books of secrets

In 1561, the manuscript I secreti della signora Isabella Cortese or The Secrets of Lady Isabella Cortese first appeared in print in Venice, introducing alchemy to a wider readership. Many of the recipes, or secrets, in Cortese's work would be referred to as home remedies. These secrets were portrayed as proven medical remedies and cure-alls.

The recipes in Secreti were divided into four distinct folio sections. The first folio illustrates the idea of medicinal recipes and explores methods for treating the main diseases spreading through Europe at the time. These include remedies for diseases like syphilis or the plague. Additionally, this section heavily promotes early scientific techniques for such distillation.

The second folio focuses on how to produce substances like gold or elixirs. Notably, this section begins with guidelines for safety and methodology before moving forward: working alone, making use of clean vessels, familiarizing oneself with alchemical experiments, keeping eyes on fire, preparation in the use of tongs, secrecy in all work, find trustworthy allies, and praising God after success of an experiment by serving the less fortunate. Once these rules were established, directions on alchemical methods to alter properties of metals were introduced, such as changing copper to gold.

The third folio covers household topics; such as assembling mirrors, dying hair, and removing stains. The fourth folio is notable for addressing topics associated with women, including beauty enhancements through creams, powders, hair dye, and oils.

=== Cosmetic recipes ===
Isabella Cortese mentions several recipes in her book that are unique to the early modern era. Although alchemy is commonly associated with transformations of materials, Cortese's work also focused on cosmetic transformations to the female body in an early form of cosmetology. Many of these recipes include ingredients no longer used today.

Recipe for face color for refining complexion:

Obtain a few birds with white feathers. During the duration of the next week to two weeks, feed them only nuts from the pine. Then, after one to two weeks have passed, take the birds and butcher them. After butchering the birds, mix the liquid obtained and some portions of the bird with a small amount of sweetbread, and also a small portion of white bread. Next, add some goat's milk and heat the solution. Once finished heating, distill the final product that will be applied to the face.

Recipe to help cleanse and detoxify one's face:

First, gather some lemon beans; be sure the beans are dried. Then, once you have mixed the two, add the mixture to a container full of white wine. When done, gather up some honey, a few eggs, and a couple of ounces of goat milk. Combine all of these ingredients together and then begin to distill the mixture.

=== Reception ===
In its time, The Secrets of Lady Isabella Cortese was very popular. It was published in eleven editions between 1561 and 1677, as well as two editions of a German translation. Ironically, part of this success can be attributed to Cortese's insistence on her readers keeping her book's secrets to themselves.

Tomaso Garzoni listed her name among the Professori di Segreti "Professor of Secrets" in his encyclopedic Piazza Universale.

Modern academics contest the attribution of the book as there is no biographical evidence that Cortese existed. Contributing to that theory is that the name "Cortese" may be an anagram for "secreto." It is possible the manuscript was published under the pseudonym "Isabella Cortese" to improve the pamphlet's perceived authority on home remedy topics for a female audience.

== See also ==
- Timeline of women in science
- Science in the Renaissance
- Renaissance magic
- Alchemy
- Books of secrets
