= Books of secrets =

Compilations of technical and medicinal recipes and magic formulae

Books of secrets were compilations of technical and medicinal recipes and magic formulae that were published throughout Europe during the High Middle Ages and Renaissance. They reached a peak in the sixteenth century and were published continually through the eighteenth. Books of secrets were intended for a public audience, but framed as revealing exclusive information. They were one of the most popular genres in early modern publishing.

Books of secrets contained collections of medical recipes, household hints, and technical recipes on topics including metallurgy, alchemy, dyeing, and making cosmetics. They widely spread practical information that had previously been limited to the private pursuits of tradesmen and families. This dissemination, and standardization, of knowledge, led some historians to link them with the emerging secularistic values of the early modern period and to the development of Baconian science.

== Description ==
Books of secrets contained recipes that could be used by a reader lacking a formal education from a university or relevant guild. Despite their often-practical nature, they were written as if they contained important secrets of the universe. This granted the books an enticing reputation, but also created an in-group among the educated. Books of secrets were often falsely attributed to respected thinkers, and many books began by telling the story of how the information was compiled. Despite this exclusive framing, books of secrets were popular reading. Some books of secrets were large encyclopedic volumes, but there were also small pamphlets sold by peddlers to lower class readers. Recipes contained in one book were frequently copied into others.

Individual books had their own focuses. Some books of secrets, such as Secreti (1555), attributed to Alessio Piemontese, contained mainly practical and technological information in the form of useful recipes. Others, such as Giambattista Della Porta's Magia Naturalis (Natural Magic, 1558) deployed practical recipes in an effort to demonstrate the principles of natural magic. Other books of secrets, such as Isabella Cortese's Secreti (1564), disseminated alchemical information to a wide readership. Recent research has suggested that the books of secrets played an important role in the emergence of experimental science by bringing practical technical information to the attention of experimental scientists.

== History ==
Books compiling recipes and natural knowledge date back to Ancient Greece and Rome, where authors such as Aristotle and Pliny wrote philosophical and practical texts about nature. This search for information became more mystical over the centuries. By the time of the Roman Empire, many writers viewed knowledge as something to be kept from the common people, who were not devout or educated enough to understand it. After the Fall of Rome and the breakdown of its infrastructure, much knowledge was lost, and what remained was often practical. Medical texts, including long lists of useful herbs and recipes for treatments, were preserved and edited to match northern European environments.

Books containing natural "secrets" experienced wide popularity even before the printing press, since they provided access to information that was usually only accessible through personal connections such as guilds and universities. One of the most famous books of the time was the treatise Secretum Secretorum, an encyclopedic work of useful and esoteric information that falsely claimed to contain all of Aristotle's secrets. Polymath Roger Bacon fought against these books of secrets as not promoting rational thought, but recent research suggests that the books may have played an important role in the emergence of experimental science by encouraging rational experimentation.

The advent of printing made it far easier to produce books, and the increasingly commercial environment of 16th century Europe incentivized printers to reprint what sold best. Books of secrets as a genre took a clear form in Italy in the 16th century, with Secreti (1555) being the model for its kind. The early printing industry had no legal protections against copyright, which led recipes being widely stolen. In Italy, recipes were often reprinted into short pamphlets, which shared secrets with lower class readers. Another motivation for stretching the truth was the rise of Renaissance Humanism, which brought classical authors back into cultural focus and incentivized publishers to fake origins for their information.

Books of secrets greatly increased the amount of practical information available to a growing class of readers, leading some historians to link books of secrets with the emerging secularistic values of the early modern period and to see them as contributing to the making of an ‘age of how-to.’ The search for new secrets also led to a perception of science as a hunt for answers, which gradually influenced the rise of experimental science.

Certain popular books of secrets remained in publication until the late 18th century, but their influence over the sharing of knowledge weakened after the 17th. The rise of experimental science gradually led the secrets of nature to seem less arcane and more understandable. How-to books remained important, but it was less desirable to share recipes to the public as though they were secrets.

== Famous books of secrets ==
Secretum Secretorum attributed to Aristotle

I Secreti (1555) attributed to Alessio Piemontese (a pseudonym of Girolamo Ruscelli)

Magia Naturalis (Natural Magic) (1588) by Giambattista Della Porta

I secreti della signora Isabella Cortese (The Secrets of Lady Isabella Cortese) (1561) attributed to Isabella Cortese

== Publications ==
- William Eamon, Science and the Secrets of Nature: Books of Secrets in Medieval and Early Modern Culture (Princeton: Princeton University Press, 1994).
- John K. Ferguson, Bibliographical Notes on Histories of Inventions and Books of Secrets. 2 vols. London: Holland Press, 1959.
