= Natural magic =

Natural science during the Renaissance

Natural magic is a tradition concerning the manipulation and development of the occult, or hidden, mechanisms within nature. Unlike ceremonial magic, it does not rely on a relationship with summoning spirits. Natural magic sometimes makes use of physical substances from the natural world such as stones or herbs. In the Medieval era, many theologians utilized the term natural magic when referring to the properties of the natural world that would operate within the realm of divinity. Natural magic worked to expose underlying mechanisms occurring in nature that cannot be explained through rational knowledge. The lack of concrete evidence results in these mechanisms being referred to as "occult properties".

Natural magic so defined includes astrology, alchemy, and certain disciplines that would today be considered fields of natural science, such as astronomy and chemistry (divergently evolved from astrology and alchemy, respectively) or botany (from herbology). Jesuit scholar Athanasius Kircher wrote that "there are as many types of natural magic as there are subjects of applied sciences".

Heinrich Cornelius Agrippa discusses natural magic in his Three Books of Occult Philosophy (1533), where he calls it "nothing else but the highest power of natural sciences". The Italian Renaissance philosopher Giovanni Pico della Mirandola, who founded the tradition of Christian Kabbalah, argued that natural magic was "the practical part of natural science" and was lawful rather than heretical. The concept of natural magic dates back to ancient philosophical traditions that proposed the existence of hidden properties within nature and their relationship to the world. These ideas were spread to Western Europe through the translation of Greco-Arabic texts into Latin and became especially influential in the medieval and Renaissance periods.

== History ==
=== Ancient origins ===
The idea that nature had occult, or hidden, properties and the desire to understand and make use of them was an idea prevalent in many ancient cultures. In ancient Greece, early philosophers sought to uncover the fundamental principles of the world and the causes of change within it. Many thinkers believed there were immaterial forces that brought structure to the universe. Empedocles, for example, proposed that attractive and repulsive forces were what drove nature, while Anaxagoras believed it was the mind, and Pythagoreans believed it was number.

Both ancient Chinese and Egyptian traditions utilized astrology to interpret patterns in nature and predict future events. For example, ancient Egyptians would record observations of the sky and interpret their meanings, believing that their gods would send warnings through celestial signs. In ancient China, yin and yang in divination, and the relationship between the five phases and astrology, were occult concepts used to interpret events in the natural world and predict future ones. Through these ancient traditions, specifically Greco-Arabic, beliefs and ideas were spread to Western Europe through Latin translations. These early attempts to explain the hidden forces of nature would later contribute to the traditions of natural magic, which similarly sought to understand and utilize the unseen principles governing the natural world.

=== Medieval period ===
Illustration of Aristotle's four-element model (earth, fire, water, air) which describes the properties of nature that later influenced the concepts of natural magic

In the Medieval period, specifically in Western Europe, the concept of learned magic had gained traction and high prestige. This was due to authority figures typically being represented as beings from preternatural origins. During this time, the term “natural magic” was only used by William of Auvergne when referring to underlying properties in the natural world. During the later half of the Medieval period, authors began to speculate that nature gained these occult properties through power of the stars.

The more general concept of occult properties originated in the medicinal field through Galen, and was interpreted by Avicenna. Avicenna is the author of a medical text titled Canon medicinae, which highlighted the formulation of these properties. In this text, Avicenna states that natural properties come from “a tota substantia”, or a whole substance, meaning that the powers are derived from a complete entity and cannot be broken into hot, dry, wet, and cold.

These occult properties were used to explain many phenomena in the Middle Ages, such as the attractive forces between magnets and the health properties of herbs and stones. Each of these could not be explained by primary qualities, which placed them into the realm of natural magic.

=== Renaissance period ===
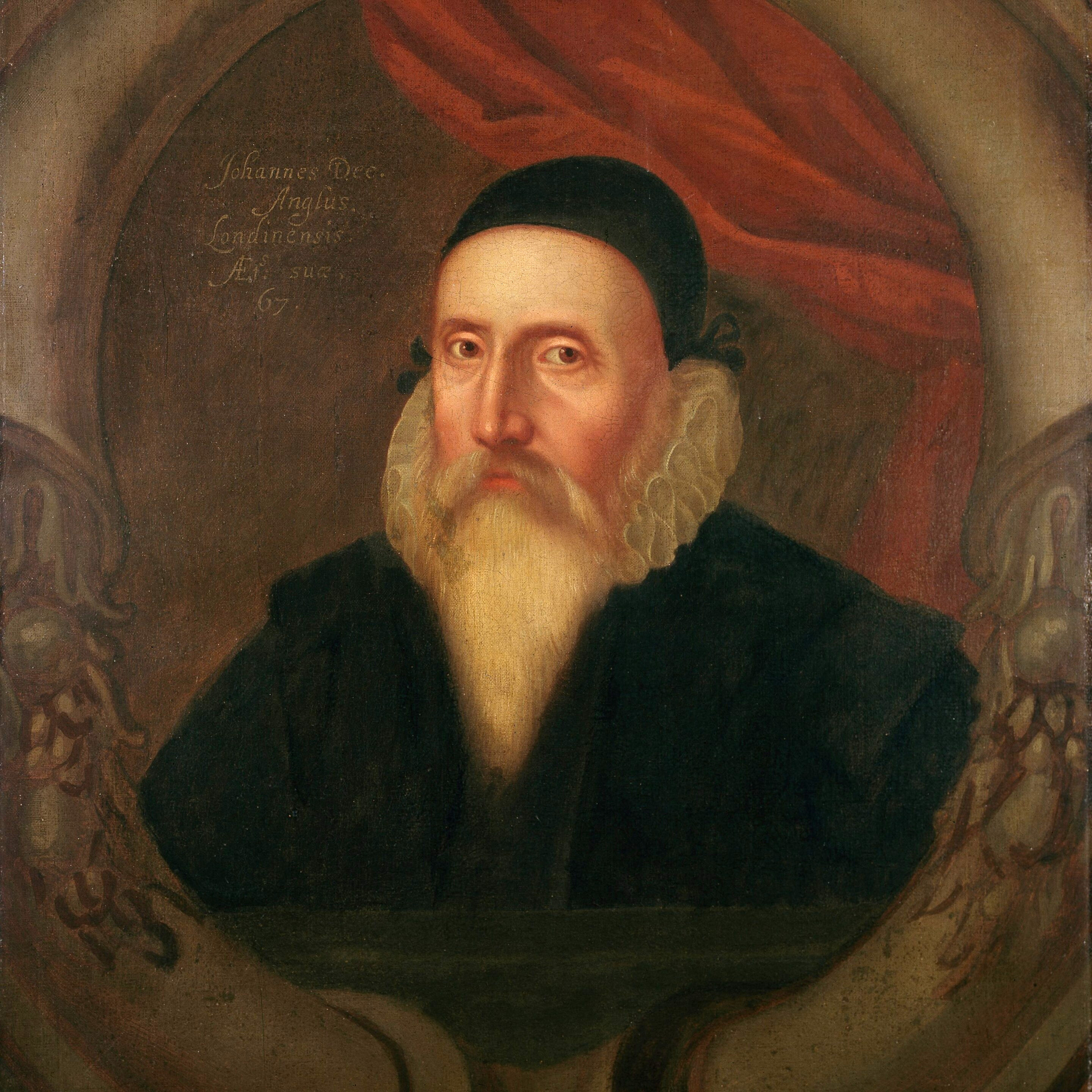
Portrait of John Dee, a 16th-century English mathematician, astrologer, astronomer, and occultist.

Transitioning into the Renaissance period from the Middle Ages, there were still many figures practicing natural magic and working with occult sciences. One notably famous figure who had influence on natural magic during this time was John Dee, an English mathematician and astronomer. He was part of expanding natural magic into broader applications, such as scientific inquiry and religious perceptions. A substantial amount of his work focused on the use of alchemy to transition base metals into gold. Dee also utilized horoscopes to interpret celestial events that would guide his decision-making in science and politics. His involvement in this occult thinking led to several accusations that he was using these celestial events to manipulate unseen forces, which shows the power that natural magic had during the Renaissance period.

Marsilio Ficino and Pico della Mirandola were two individuals known for establishing the foundation for philosophical occultists during the Renaissance period. These philosophical thinkers described occult practices as stages that led to one being closer to the divine. Once an individual progresses toward spiritual enlightenment, they begin to understand the inner workings of the natural world, and they can manipulate names and symbols to influence natural forces. This idea became a central focus for philosophical occultists during the Renaissance Period. Paracelsus, a Swiss-German physician, alchemist, and astrologer, emphasized this idea and believed that alchemy was meant to purify aspects of nature that nature leaves imperfect.

Natural magic in the Renaissance period, then, was not simply aiming to prove scientific inquiries like turning base metals into gold. It functioned as a spiritual system where philosophical occultists could progressively understand and ultimately perfect the workings of the natural world.

The cultural battle to expand the legitimacy of natural magic, which was often condemned by ecclesiastical institutions as a diabolical attempt to alter the laws of creation, reached its climax with Giordano Bruno, who championed the inherent naturalness of every form of magic. For Bruno, distinguishing between a natural and a supernatural realm made no sense. Instead, he differentiated between science and superstition: in the former case, magic is based on the rational structure of reality and its connections of sympathy (powers of attraction and repulsion between things), allowing for intervention; in the latter, reason is subjugated to religious faith, under the illusion of uniting with God through extra-natural means.

=== Scientific Revolution ===
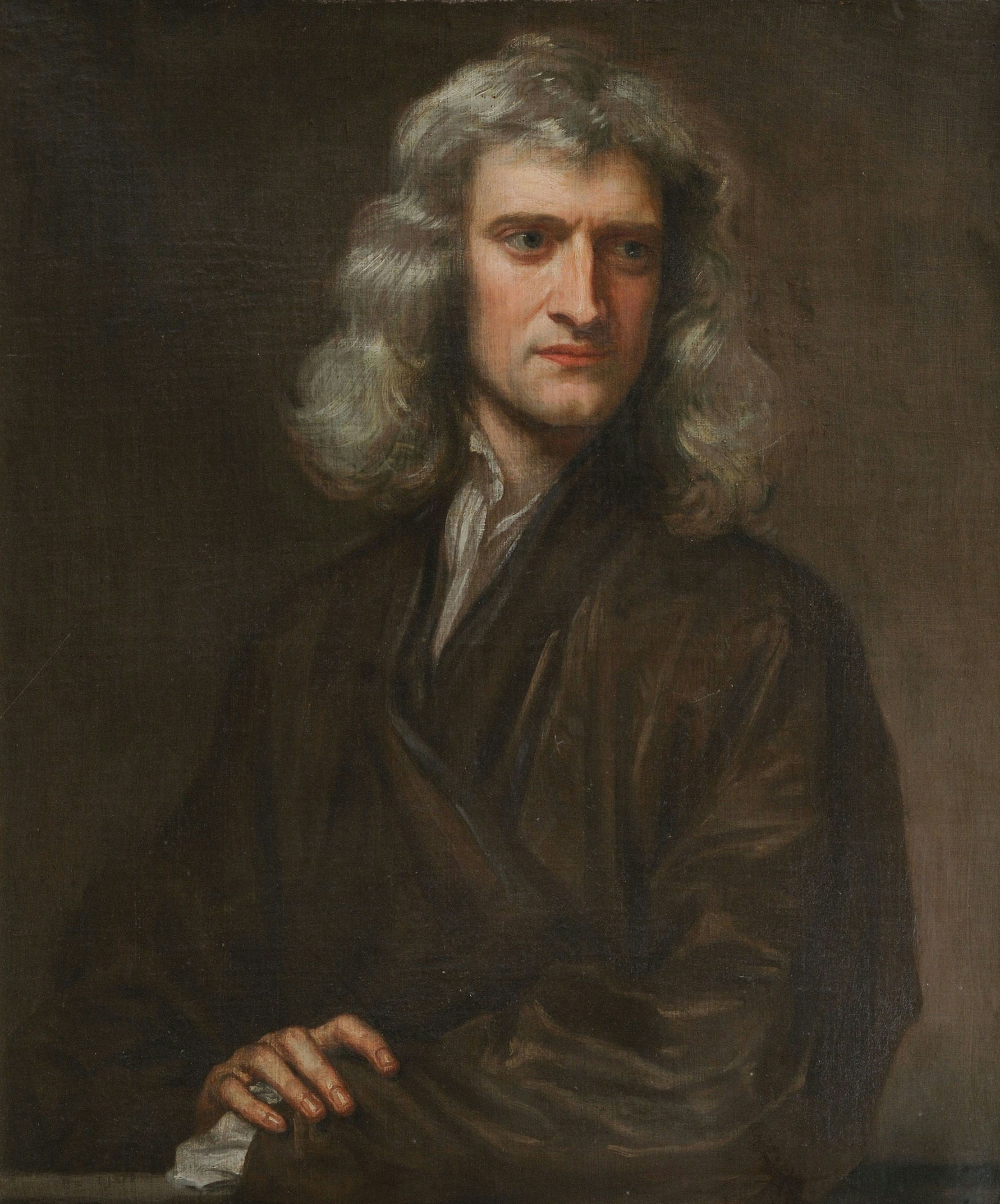
Portrait of Sir Isaac Newton, 1689

During the Scientific Revolution in the seventeenth century, the way science was viewed started to drastically change. The role of natural magic began to shift, but it did not disappear. Specifically, the idea of “occult properties” had an important role in the developing scientific worldview. The invisible forces in nature, which were previously thought of as magical concepts, came to be known as more rational and mathematical ones. For example, phenomena such as gravity and light were once thought to be mysterious, unknown forces, but during the Scientific Revolution, scientists began to explain them as rays or forces acting across a space.

This transformation of thought is shown through figures like Isaac Newton, whose theory of gravity relied on a force at a distance, similar to earlier beliefs related to natural magic. While Newton and other scientists moved away from magical explanations, theories of natural magic helped to inspire their work. Despite beliefs and reasonings changing, “occult qualities” helped to establish ideas such as force interactions, which remain a central part of modern physics today.

== See also ==
- Kitāb al-nawāmīs – Arabic book of magic
- Giambattista della Porta – Italian polymath (1535–1615)
- Magia Naturalis – Book by Giambattista della Porta
- Protoscience – Research field that may become a science
- Thomas Vaughan – Welsh philosopher (1621–1666)
- White magic – Magic used for selfless purposes
