= Secreta mulierum =

Medieval text about sexuality and reproduction

Secreta mulierum, also known as De secretis mulierum, is a natural philosophical text from the late thirteenth or early fourteenth century frequently attributed to Albertus Magnus, although it is more likely written by one of his followers. Originally written in Latin, the title translates as The Secrets of Women or Of the Secrets of Women. Drawing on Hippocratic, Galenic, and Aristotelian theories, this text discusses sexuality and reproduction from both a medical and philosophical perspective. Over eighty manuscript copies of the treatise have been identified, and it has been translated into multiple different languages over several centuries. This suggests that the ideas expressed in this work were hugely popular and influential. It was added to the Index librorum prohibitorum in 1605.

== Contents ==
Owing to both the medical and philosophical nature of the text, a variety of topics are discussed by pseudo-Albert. While some of the thirteen chapters are strictly medical, such as those on the signs of conception, the period of gestation, and the nature of the menses, others are largely theoretical. For example, the author discusses at length how the planets and constellations can affect a developing fetus. It can come as no surprise that the author's philosophical discussions are more in-depth and developed considering natural philosophy was more significant than medicine in the sources, such as Aristotle, from which the author drew his information. Therefore, the nature of Secreta Mulierum is more accurately categorized as cosmological or philosophical in focus and not medical. In fact, the author demonstrates a lack of basic medical knowledge, even for the time period. For example, the author states in his discussion of menses that urine and menstrual blood are expelled from the body through the same opening. Scholars have concluded the writing may have been designed to be used as an instructional text on human reproduction for the religious community due to its nature, rather than for medical training.

== Chapters ==
1. On the Generation of the Embryo
2. On the Formation of the Fetus
3. Concerning the Influence of the Planets
4. On the Generation of Imperfect Animals
5. On the Exit of the Fetus From the Uterus
6. Concerning Monsters in Nature
7. On the Signs of Conception
8. On the Signs of Whether a Male or Female Is In the Uterus
9. On the Signs of Corruption of Virginity
10. On the Signs of Chastity
11. Concerning a Defect of the Womb
12. Concerning Impediments to Conception
13. On the Generation of the Sperm

== Views of menstruation ==
Like many philosophers of this time, the author reasons that human embryos are made from the seed of the father and the menses of the mother. It was believed that menstrual blood was surplus food that had not been used by the woman's body. The author states that the menses comes once a month due to the cold and humid nature of women and is the color of blood except in corrupt women. It was thought that women who had been corrupted by bad or viscous humors would have menses the color of lead. When conception occurs, the womb "closes up like a purse on all sides" and therefore menstruation stops. However, the author suggests that the woman is still taking in excess food during her pregnancy that is not being purged and therefore claims pregnant women have a greater desire for sexual intercourse.

The author suggests that women keep themselves away from men during their monthly flow. The author believes that menstrual flow is poisonous and can even harm the eyes of children if they are looked upon by the woman. When menstruation stops at menopause, the retention of menses builds up and results in an excess of evil humors, which can escape through the eyes and infect the air, polluting the world.

== Astrology ==
The formation of the fetus is a key topic in the text, and the supposed influence of celestial bodies on the fetus is important to the author, as they endow the fetus with certain abilities.

The author also attributes certain body parts to the twelve signs of the Zodiac. For example, the formation of the feet and sole is attributed to Pisces. Thus, it can be seen that astrological influence on reproduction was an idea to this author in this time.

== Edition and Translation ==
Lemay, Helen Rodnite. Women's Secrets: A Translation of Pseudo-Albertus Magnus's De secretis mulierum with Commentaries. SUNY Series in Medieval Studies. Albany: SUNY Press, 1992.

Barragán Nieto, José Pablo (ed., trad.), El De secretis mulierum atribuido a Alberto Magno, Porto, Fédération Internationale des Instituts d’Études Médiévales / Turnhout, Brepols, 2012.
