= Girolamo Ruscelli =

Italian mathematician and cartographer (1518–1566)

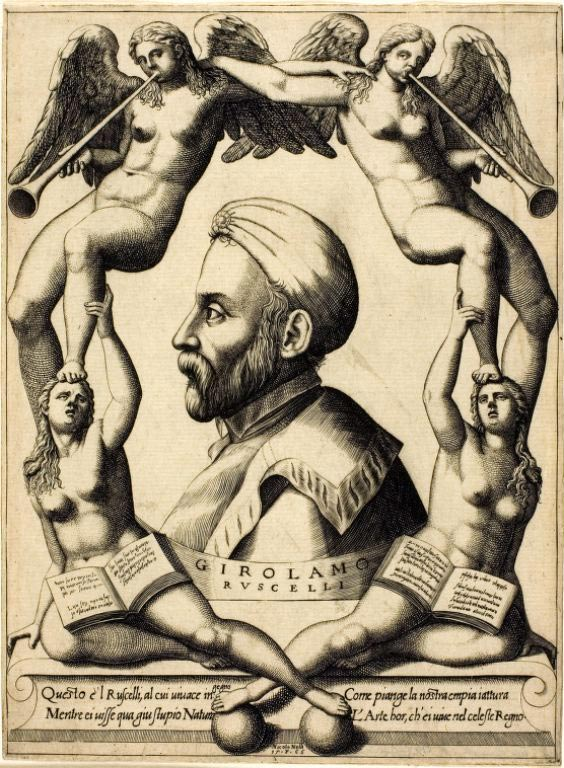
- Born: 1518; Viterbo, Papal States
- Died: 1566 (aged 47–48); Venice, Republic of Venice
- Occupations: Mathematician; cartographer; writer
- Movement: Renaissance humanism

Girolamo Ruscelli (1518–1566) was an Italian mathematician and cartographer active in Venice during the early 16th century. He was also an alchemist, writing pseudonymously as Alessio Piemontese.

== Biography ==
Girolamo Ruscelli was born in Viterbo (from a family described by different sources as of humble origins, of minor nobility, or notaries), probably in 1518, although many texts list the year of birth as 1504.

He lived in Aquileia, then in Padua, and later in Rome where in 1541 he founded the "Accademia dello Sdegno". He later moved to Naples, and finally in 1548 he moved to Venice where he remained until his death.

The exact term to describe his business is the polygraph, a literary man who, immediately after the invention of printing, earned a living working for a publisher on his works or translating and often plagiarizing the work of others. He was a writer on the most varied subjects, both as author or curator, and on behalf of third parties, in this latter function in particular until 1555 in partnership with the publisher Plinio Pietrasanta. In that year he was tried by the Inquisition for the unlicensed publication of a satirical poem, Il capitolo delle Lodi del Fuso published by Plinio Pietrasanta in Venice 1554, and fined 50 ducats (about 6oz of gold), after which the small publishing company did not long survive. Most of his later works were published by Vincenzo Valgrisi.

A mannerist portrait of Ruscelli by his friend Bernardo Tasso was found in Il Minturno overo de la Bellezza by Bernardo's son Torquato Tasso. Based on documents from testamentary bequests, it is known that Ruscelli's wife was Virginia Panarelli, sister of Teofilo Panarelli a doctor with Protestant sympathies who was hanged and burned in Rome in 1572.

It is generally accepted that he was Alessio Piemontese (in Latin, Alexius Pedemontanus), a pseudonym under which he wrote an immensely popular book of alchemy first published in 1555, De Secreti Del Alessio Piemontese, which included recipes for alchemical compounds, cosmetics, dyes, and medicines. It was reprinted for over two centuries and translated into numerous languages (French, English, German, Latin, Dutch, Spanish, Polish, Danish).

Among his best-known works, printed by Vincenzo Valgrisi, were translations of various classics including The Decameron, Orlando Furioso, and a translation of the Geography of Ptolemy. Among the 69 copperplate maps in his translation of Geografia were 40 then contemporary maps based generally on maps compiled by Giacomo Gastaldi in 1548. He engaged in linguistics and compiled a Rimario (rhyming dictionary) that remained in use until the 19th century.

== Works ==
Title page of the French edition of Ruscelli's Secreti, Antwerp, Plantin, 1557

- Girolamo Ruscelli, Tre discorsi à M. Lodovico Dolce. L'uno intorno al Decamerone del Boccaccio, L'altro all'Osservationi della lingua volgare, Et il terzo alla tradottione dell'Ovidio. Venice, Plinio Pietrasanta, 1553.
- Girolamo Ruscelli (curated by), Rime di diversi eccellenti autori bresciani...tra le quali sono le rime della Signora Veronica Gambara, & di M. Pietro Barignano, ridotte alla vera sincerità loro, Venice, Plinio Pietrasanta, 1554
- Girolamo Ruscelli, De secreti del reverendo donno Alessio Piemontese, prima parte divisa in sei libri. Opera utilissima et universalmente necessaria e dilettevole a ciascheduno. Ora in questa seconda editione dall'autor medesimo tutta ricorretta et migliorata. Et aggiuntovi nel fine de ogni libro molti bellissimi secreti nuovi, Venice, 1557.
- Girolamo Ruscelli (ed.), Tutte le Rime della Illustriss. et Eccellentiss. Signora Vittoria Colonna. Marchesana di Pescara. Con l'espositione del Signor Rinaldo Corso, nuovamente mandate in luce da Girolamo Ruscelli. Venice, Giovan Battista Et Melchior Sessa Fratelli, 1558.
- Ludovico Ariosto, Girolamo Ruscelli (ed.), Orlando Furioso... Con le Annotationi, gli Auvertimenti, & le Dichiarationi di Girolamo Ruscelli, La Vita dell'Autore descritta dal Signore Giovan Battista Pigna. Gli Scontri de' luoghi mutati... Aggiuntavi in questa Seconda impressione la Dichiaratione di tutte le Istorie, et Favole toccate nel presente libro, fatta da M. Nicolò Eugenico. Annotationi, Et Auvertimenti Di Girolamo Ruscelli, Venice, Vincenzo Valgrisi, 1558.
- Girolamo Ruscelli, Del modo di comporre in versi nella lingua italiana, trattato di Girolamo Ruscelli, nuouamente mandato in luce. Nel quale va compreso vn pieno & ordinatissimo Rimario, con la dichiaratione, con le regole, et col giudicio per saper conueneuolmente usare ò schifar le uoci nell'esser loco, così nelle prose, come ne i uersi, (noto anche come Rimario), Venezia, Giovanni Battista e Melchiorre Sessa fratelli, 1559.
- Girolamo Ruscelli, Le Imprese illustri, Venice, 1566, doi:10.3931/e-rara-79841.
- Precetti della militia moderna (in Italian). Venezia: Melchiorre Sessa (1.). 1568.
- Girolamo Ruscelli (Alessio Piemontese), Secreti nuovi di maravigliosa virtù..., Venice, eredi di Marchiò Sessa, 1567
- Girolamo Ruscelli (ed.), Lettere di principi, le quali o si scrivono da principi o a principi o ragionano di principi, Venice, Giordano Ziletti e compagni, 1570-1577.
- Girolamo Ruscelli, Precetti della Militia moderna, tanto per mare, quanto per terra. Trattati da diversi nobilissimi ingegni, & raccolti ... né quali si contiene tutta l'arte del bombardiero, & si mostra l'ordine che ha da tenere il maestro di campo ....., In Venice, Heredi di Marchiò Sessa, 1572.
- Girolamo Ruscelli, Le Imprese illustri, con espositioni, et discorsi... Con la Giunta di altre Imprese tutto riordinato et corretto da Francesco Patritio. Venezia, 1572 (Libri I-III), 1583 (Libro quarto).
- Girolamo Ruscelli, De' commentarii della lingua italiana. Del sig. Girolamo Ruscelli viterbese libri VII. Ne' quali con facilità, et copiosamente si tratta tutto quello, che alla vera et perfetta notitia di detta Lingua s'appartiene: hora posti in luce da Vincenzo Ruscelli. Con due Tavole, una de' capitoli, & l'altra delle cose più notabili. All'Illustrissimo, & Eccellentissimo Sig. Iacomo Boncompagno Duca di Sora, & Governator Generale di S. Chiesa, Venice, Damian Zenaro, 1581
- Kunstbuch Des Wolerfarnen Herren Alexii Pedemontani/ von mancherleyen nutzlichen unnd bewerten Secreten oder Künsten / jetzt newlich auß Welscher und Lateinischer Sprach in Teutsch gebracht/ durch Doctor Hanß Jacob Wecker/ Stattartzet zu Colmar. Basel: König. 1616.
- Les secrets de reverend Alexis Piémontois: contenans excellens remedes contre plusieurs maladies, playes et autres accidens; avec la manière de faire distillations, parfuns, confitures, teintures, couleurs et fusions; oeuvre bien approuvé, très utile et nécessaire a un chacun. Anvers: Plantin. 1557.
- De' secreti del reverendo donno Alessio Piemontese. Venetia: de gli Antonii, 1562. . Vol. 1, 2, 3
- Secreti (in Italian). Vol. 1. Venice: eredi Ghirardo Imberti. 1644.
- Secreti (in Italian). Vol. 2. Venezia: eredi Ghirardo Imberti. 1644.
- Secreti (in Italian). Vol. 3. Venezia: eredi Ghirardo Imberti. 1644.
- Secreti (in Italian). Vol. 4. Venezia: eredi Ghirardo Imberti. 1644.

== Ruscelli's maps ==
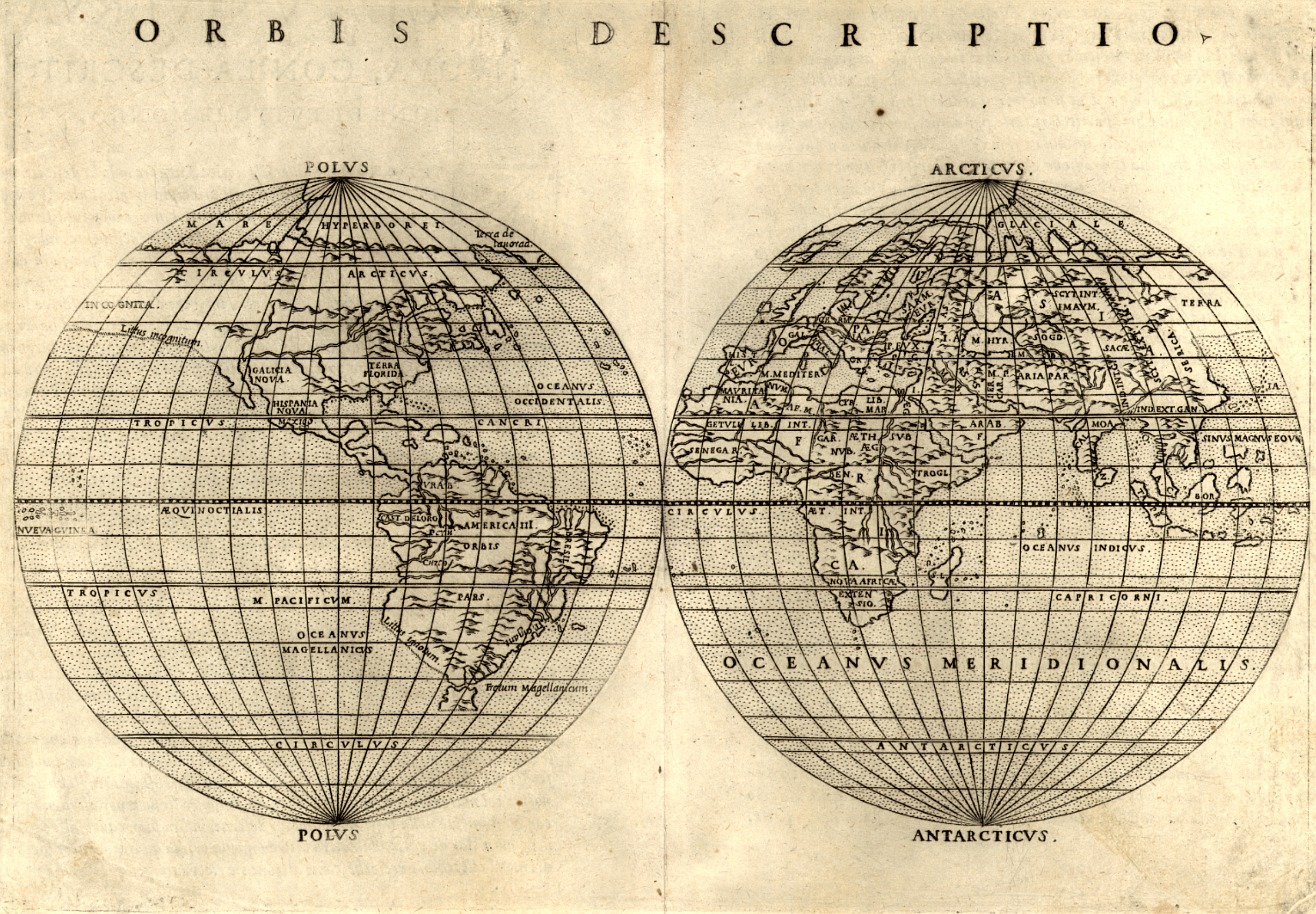
Orbis Descriptio, 1561

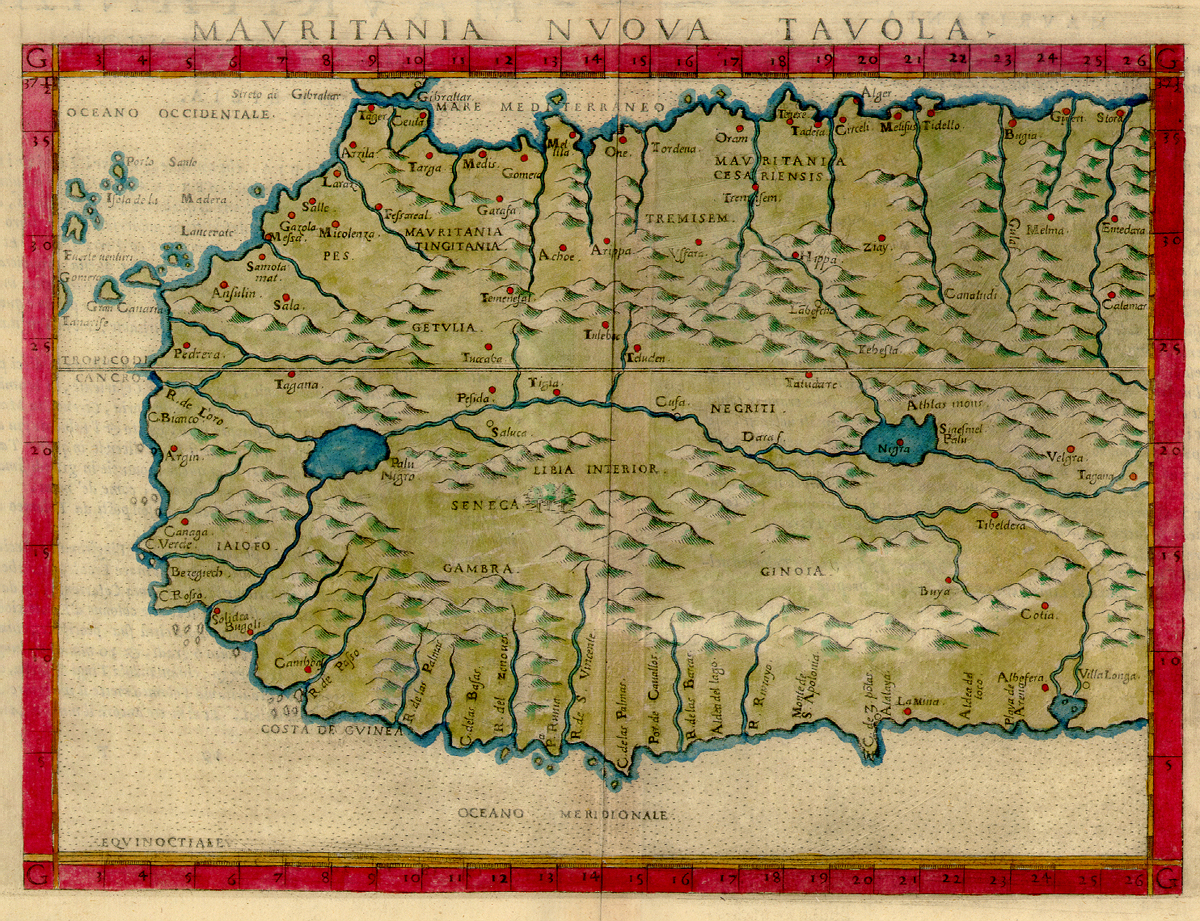
1561 map of West Africa by Girolamo Ruscelli

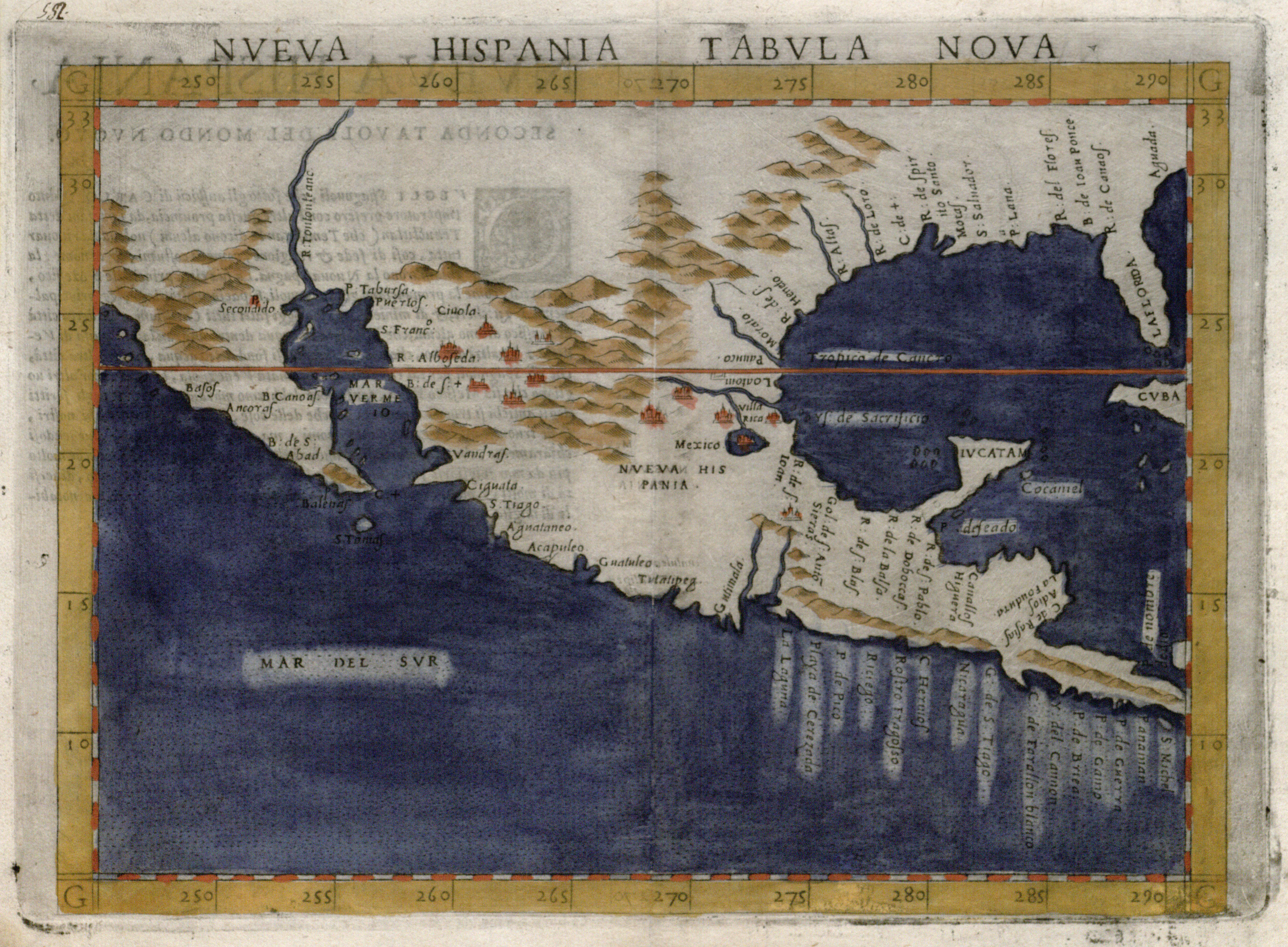
1574 map of New Spain by Girolamo Ruscelli

The World Known to Ptolemy, a world map on Ptolemy's first projection, from Ruscelli's edition of Ptolemy's Geography, 1574

1580 map of Greece and West Anatolia by Girolamo Ruscelli

1574 map of Muscovy by Girolamo Ruscelli

== Bibliography ==
- Ferguson, John K. (1931). "The Secrets of Alexis. A Sixteenth Century Collection of Medical and Technical Receipts". Proceedings of the Royal Society of Medicine. 24 (2). London: 225–46. doi:10.1177/003591573002400256. PMC 2182063. PMID 19987885.
- Di Filippo Bareggi, Claudia (1988). Il mestiere di scrivere: lavoro intellettuale e mercato librario a Venezia nel Cinquecento. Roma: Bulzoni.
- Trovato, Paolo (1992). Con ogni diligenza corretto. La stampa e le revisioni editoriali dei testi letterari italiani (1470-1570). Ferrara: Unifepress.
- P. Procaccioli; C. Gizzi, eds. (2010). Girolamo Ruscelli. Lettere. Manziana: Vecchiarelli. ISBN 978-8882472856.
- A. Iacono; P. Marini (a cura di), eds. (2011). Girolamo Ruscelli. Dediche e avvisi ai lettori. Manziana: Vecchiarelli. ISBN 978-88-8247-299-3.
- Telve, Stefano (2011). Ruscelli grammatico e polemista nei Tre discorsi a M. Lodovico Dolce. Manziana: Vecchiarelli. ISBN 978-88-8247-296-2.
- Iacono, Antonella (2011). Bibliografia di Girolamo Ruscelli. Le edizioni del Cinquecento. Manziana: Vecchiarelli. ISBN 978-88-8247-297-9.
- P. Procaccioli; P. Marini, eds. (2012). Girolamo Ruscelli. Dall'accademia alla corte alla tipografia, Atti del convegno internazionale di studi, Viterbo 6-8 ottobre 2011. Manziana: Vecchiarelli.
- Celaschi, M.; Gregori, A. (2015). Da Girolamo Ruscelli a Alessio Piemontese. I Secreti dal Cinque al Settecento. Manziana: Vecchiarelli. ISBN 978-88-8247-363-1.
- Celaschi, Massimiliano (2016). "I Secreti di Alessio Piemontese – Appunti di lavoro e risorse digitali". nuovorinascimento.org. A site about the Renaissance with information about Alessio Piemontese.
