= Federico Cesi =

Italian scientist (1585–1630)

Federico Angelo Cesi
- Federico Angelo Cesi
- Born: 26 February 1585; Rome
- Died: 1 August 1630 (aged 45); Acquasparta
- Education: privately educated
- Known for: founding the Accademia dei Lincei
- Scientific career
- Fields: naturalist, botany, natural history, and natural philosophy

Federico Angelo Cesi (Italian: [fedeˈriːko ˈandʒelo ˈtʃɛːzi]; 26 February 1585 – 1 August 1630) was an Italian scientist, naturalist, and founder of the Accademia dei Lincei. On his father's death in 1630, he became briefly lord of Acquasparta.

== Biography ==
Federico Cesi was born to an aristocratic family highly connected in Rome and the Papal States. The family derives its name from Cesi, a little town near Rome. They had a close connection with the Catholic Church, Frederico's uncle Bartolomeo Cesi was a cardinal in the church, and most of their wealth came from that connection. Federico was the first of eleven legitimate male children and was born in Palazzo Cesi, in via della Maschera d'Oro, Rome, on 26 February 1585. His father was Federico, marchese di Monticelli (1562–1630) and his mother was Olimpia Orsini of Todi. In 1614 Cesi was married to Artemisia Colonna, the daughter of Francesco, Principe di Palestrina; she died two years later. In 1617 he married Isabella, cousin of Filippo Salviati, the daughter of the Marquis of Lorenzo. In 1618 he moved to Acquasparta and lived there until his death at the age of forty-five.

== The Accademia dei Lincei ("Academy of the Lynxes") ==
In 1603, at the age of eighteen, Cesi invited three slightly older friends, the Dutch physician Johannes van Heeck (in Italy Giovanni Ecchio), and two fellow Umbrians, mathematician Francesco Stelluti of Fabriano and polymath Anastasio de Filiis of Terni to join with him in the founding of the Accademia dei Lincei ("Academy of the Lynxes"), aimed at the understanding of all natural sciences through a method of research based upon observation, experiment, and the inductive method. Their goal was to penetrate the secrets of nature, observing it at both microscopic and macroscopic levels. The four men chose the name "Lincei" (lynx) from Giambattista della Porta's book "Magia Naturalis", which had an illustration of the fabled cat on the cover and the words "...with lynx-like eyes, examining those things which manifest themselves, so that having observed them, he may zealously use them". Cesi chose the sharp-eyed lynx and the eagle for the academy's symbols. The academy's motto, chosen by Cesi, was: "take care of small things if you want to obtain the greatest results" (minima cura si maxima vis).

Since it was an uncertain time to conduct scientific research — in 1578 the Inquisition by order of the Pope Gregory XIII had closed Giambattista della Porta's Academia Secretorum Naturae in Naples under suspicion of sorcery — the Accademia dei Lincei had rough beginnings. Cesi's own father forbade Cesi's association with the other three men, suspecting them of undermining his authority and trying to separate his son from family interests. The four "Lynxes" soon returned to their native cities and continued to communicate only by letter, adopting astronomical pen names: Cesi, perpetual president, was Celívago. During this time of separation, Cesi began collecting books for a library that he intended for personal use and for the use of the Academy. Cesi's activity in this endeavor was recorded by the Academy's librarian Giuseppe Gabrieli. Letters from Cesi to van Heeck revealed that Cesi was sending him money with the intention of buying rare books and manuscripts to send back. The Academy's chancellor and secretary Johaness Faber donated his entire scientific collection to Cesi and he acquired a number of other texts from other compatriots. Cesi travelled to Naples where he met della Porta, who he seemed to have been corresponding with for some time. There he described his academy to Della Porta, who encouraged Cesi to continue with his endeavours. The academy survived due to Cesi's personal wealth and his diplomatic skills in navigating the politics of Counter-Reformation Rome. Cesi expanded the ranks of the academy, recruiting Giambattista della Porta himself in 1610 and Galileo Galilei in 1611. Cesi's letter to Galileo of 21/7/1612 mentioned Kepler's ellipses. Cesi's Academy published Galileo's Istoria e dimostrazione intorno alle macchie solari (Letters on Sunspots) in 1613, The Assayer in 1623, and also had a hand in defending Galileo in his controversies with establishment leaders and ecclesiastical authorities.

Cesi's own intense activity in the academy was cut short by his sudden death in 1630, and the original Accademia dei Lincei did not survive his death. It was revived in its current form of the Pontifical Academy of Sciences, by Pope Pius IX in 1847.

The plant genus Caesia was named in his honour.

== Cesi and Astronomy ==
Cesi started gaining interest in the study of astronomy around 1605, when he became familiar with Johannes Kepler and Tycho Brahe's research. He specifically looked into the theories pertaining to the permeability of the Heavens and the routes of different comets. These led to interest in the recently invented telescope and in meeting two well-known astronomers, Giovanbattista della Porta and Galileo Galilei. There is no evidence to prove exactly when Cesi was able to handle and use a telescope for the first time, but it is likely he was able to see through the invention before fall began in 1609. The first verification that Cesi had knowledge of the telescope is seen in a letter from August 28, 1609. The letter was sent by Giovanbattista della Porta, an Italian natural philosopher, and it depicted an illustration of the early telescope along with instructions on how to manufacture one. Cesi was intrigued by della Porta and wanted to learn everything from him, so he traveled to Naples in May 1610 to visit della Porta. While there, Cesi was able to see the advancements that della Porta came up with and was very impressed when he was able to see a man three thousand paces away. During his visit, he recruited della Porta to come join him at the Academy. His friendship with della Porta also led him to become familiar with another astronomer by the name Galileo Galilei. Cesi played a critical part in bringing Galileo to Rome in 1611, where Cesi planned out his schedule and followed him everywhere. Cesi sought out to learn everything he could about Galileo and his discoveries, and even helped him plan out his presentations. Cesi went to all of Galileo's demonstrations of the telescope and was in amazement of the way he could prove Aristotelian views wrong. He backed Galileo and his research up, and he brought other people to observe Galileo and come to the same conclusion. Cesi formally invited Galileo to join the Academy and expand his knowledge in April, 1611. Galileo brought a new wave to the Academy, and they stopped looking into what was wrong with old science and started to build the new science.

Shortly after the founding of the Accademia dei Lincei, the founding members began their first major project. In August of 1603, Cesi and his compatriots began design and construction of a large astrolabe to which they referred to as "The Planisphere or the Great Astrolabe." The astrolabe's construction only lasted about two months, finishing on October 12. Upon completion, the three co-founders used the astrolabe to embark on their first philosophical task. The Linceans sought to align society with Christianity and Platonic philosophy. They believed that Catholicism and Aristotelianism had been causing a deterioration of contemporary knowledge and moral values. They trusted that replacing these ideologies could be countered by enforcing Plato's philosophy outlined in the Timaeus, describing the connections between man and the universe. Only a few years after their work began, 1604–1608, the Holy Council tried Cesi's colleague, Joannes van Heeck, for heresy. During this trial, Federico's father sent van Heeck from Rome and halted his son's work until 1609.

== Other contributions ==
- Had a hand in coining the name "telescope".
- Directed excavations of Carsulae.
- First to view fern spores under microscope.

== Books by Federico Cesi ==
- Theatrum totius naturae, a "Universal theatre of nature", which he began around 1615 and never completed; it was a project for a comprehensive encyclopedia of natural history.
