= Johannes van Heeck =

Dutch physician, naturalist, alchemist and astrologer

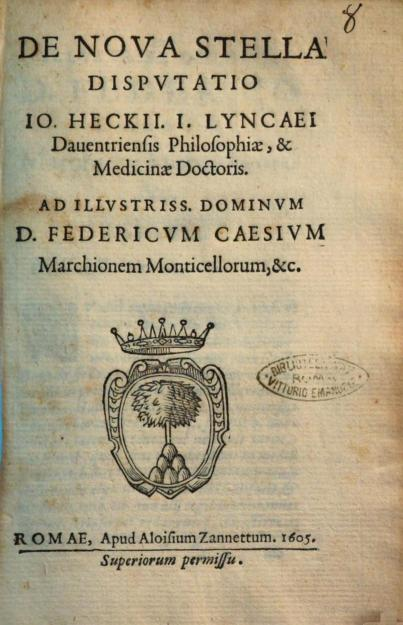
Frontespiece of 'De Nova Stella Disputatio' by Johannes van Heeck, 1605

Johannes van Heeck, (Deventer 2 February 1579 – presumably Sant'Angelo Romano c.1620), (also known as Johann Heck, Joannes Eck, Johannes Heckius, Johannes Eckius and Giovanni Ecchio) (Note: There were two older Giovanni Ecchios, mentioned in Paolo Sarpi's History of the Council of Trent; one was assigned to refute the arguments put forward by Martin Luther (this is Johann Eck) and the other was described as an official of the Archbishop of Trier at the same Council) was a Dutch physician, naturalist, alchemist and astrologer. Together with Prince Federico Cesi, Anastasio de Filiis and Francesco Stelluti, he was one of the four founding members of the Accademia dei Lincei, the first learned society dedicated to understanding of the natural world through scientific enquiry.

== Family background ==
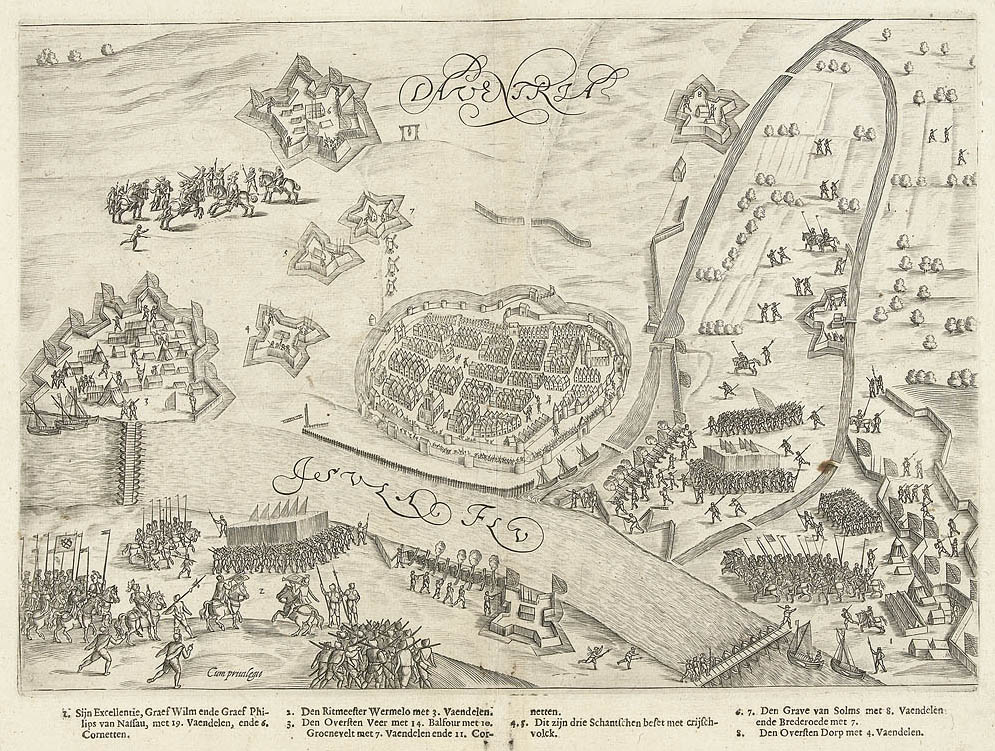
The siege of Deventer in 1591

Johannes van Heeck was one of five children in a family of wealthy merchants. His father was Willem, son of Willem van Heeck, and his mother was Lutgardt, daughter of Gerrit. Between 1587 and 1591 his father, a Catholic, was one of Deventer's political leaders, elected senator and consul in 1589. For this reason, when Protestant forces under Maurice of Nassau took the city in 1591, Willem van Heeck was fined 150 guilders for being a leader of the Catholic party and a collaborator of the hated Philip II of Spain.

Johannes received a humanist education, studying Latin, Greek, theology, astronomy and astrology, and making an exact observation of the comet that appeared in 1591, which he described in one of his later treatises as a bad omen for a life full of bitterness and pain. Under Calvinist rule, the position of his family became more precarious in Deventer and eventually his parents decided to send him to Italy to continue his education.

== Early career ==
Van Heeck traveled to Milan, Parma, Ferrara, Venice, Bologna and Rome. He stayed for a while in Spoleto as a guest of Count Gelosi, with whom he maintained a connection throughout his life, and on whose estate was the villa known as the "museum deauratum" where many of his manuscripts were composed. Here he wrote works of a moral literary character, such as his 1596 Epigrammata, as well as medical, magical and astrological topics. Among these was his Liber de Regimine Sanitatis Eorum Qui Studio Litterarum Incumbunt in which, inspired by De Vita Libri Tres ('The Threefold Life') of Marsilio Ficino, he examined the hygiene, diet and amorous habits of the literati. The second part of the work dealt with Ficino's ideas on magic. He discussed the influence of images on the spirit, and the occult virtues of certain plants, approaching his enquiry from the medical point of view rather than from that of the magician. He concluded the treatise with a list of secrets for healing common illnesses by using certain plants, and with a collection of "magic" recipes.

Following De Regimine there are four undated manuscripts dealing with plants and medicine:

- De Fructibus Tractatus ('Treatise on Fruits')
- Tractatus de Radicibus Herbarum Diversarum ('Treatise on the Roots of Various Herbs')
- Tractatus de Herbis ('Treatise on Herbs') and
- Tractatus de Herbis et Holeribus ('Treatise on Herbs and Vegetables')

In these he described the characteristics of various fruits, herbs and vegetables, their regions of origin, the time of their flowering, ways of preparing them and their specific medicinal use. He wrote on the basis of first-hand observation, supported by ancient sources, notably Dioscorides.

With financial backing from a supportive bishop, he then studied medicine at the University of Perugia, obtaining his doctor's degree in 1601. During this period, his writing focused on logic, theology and metaphysics. Among the more significant of his works while he studied at university were:

- Homines et Alia Animalia Prodigiosa Variarum Ignotarum Regionum (Of Humans and Other Animals)
- De mundiali machina (1598), a summary of astronomical knowledge
- De Planetarum Radiationibus in Singulis Zodiaci Signis (On the Movement of the Planets Through the Signs of the Zodiac)
- another treatise on astronomy with numerous diagrams drawn by himself
- a treatise on apoplexy
- a treatise on angina pectoris entitled De Syncope (On Fainting)
- Cura Coelestis quae Inferorum Appellatur (Heavenly Care), written for doctors and for all who 'love philosophy'
- Super Plinii II Historias Naturales, a commentary on Pliny's 'Natural History', extended in scope beyond the original, with the ambitious subtitle 'Liber de Mirabilibus Creaturarum Dei' (Book of the Marvels of God's Creation'). In this work, van Heeck dealt with a number of contemporary concerns of natural science, such as geocentric theory and other Copernican views, against which he argued strongly.

He practised as a doctor first in Maenza and then in Scandriglia in the province of Rieti, part of the domain of Duke Giovanni Antonio Orsini. In the course of his medical work, van Heeck became involved in a strange dispute. He treated his patients, who were mostly poor, with great zeal, using simple herbal medicines. For this reason, he came into conflict with the apothecary of Scandriglia, one Casolini Ranieri, who made his living selling medicines with exotic names, more magical than scientific. Ranieri conceived a firm hatred of the foreign doctor, whose work threatened to ruin his lucrative business. One night Ranieri positioned himself on the route where van Heeck habitually passed and attacked him while he was alone. Van Heeck fell from his horse but fended off his attacker with a sword. Still bleeding from his injuries, he was brought before the magistrate. Despite his plea of self-defence, he was imprisoned. The apothecary later died of his wounds, and van Heeck would have been left to rot in prison if he had not been released through the intervention of Prince Federico Cesi, who sent Francesco Stelluti to get him out of prison and then invited him to his house in Rome. The period when Cesi, van Heeck and Stelluti lived together after van Heeck's release from prison was one of an intense exchange of ideas and the shaping of plans, which led to the idea of forming a mutual-instruction society.

== Accademia dei Lincei ==
This close partnership between Cesi, van Heeck and Stelluti soon led to their founding the Accademia dei Lincei, together with Anastasio de Filiis, on 17 August 1603. There is no doubt that van Heeck played a key role in the conception and organization of the academy. He was the most experienced, educated and famous member of the group, and he clearly took the lead in many of its ventures, though he was the second youngest among them. Like all its members, he adopted a pseudonym ("Illuminato"), an emblem (a quarter-moon illuminated by a triangle from the sun) and the motto "A Patre luminum" ('from the father of lights'). It was van Heeck who chose as the academy's patron saint John the Baptist, the apostle of arcane visions. He also drafted its articles of association and devised its ceremonial.

Van Heeck referred to the Accademia as 'the most sagacious investigators of the secrets of nature, and dedicated to the Paracelsan disciplines' – indicating thereby that like the Swiss physician, they believed that empirical observation was essential for developing an understanding of the world, rather than reliance on established scholarly authorities.

There has been speculation that the connections between the Accademia's members were not confined to the intellectual sphere, and, specifically in the case of the relationship between Federico Cesi and Johannes van Heeck, that they were probably sexual in nature.

== Travels in Europe ==
In the spring of 1604, Prince Cesi's father the Duke of Acquasparta was so concerned about the activities of the Accademia dei Lincei and what he considered the nefarious influence of van Heeck over his son that he denounced him to the Roman Inquisition. This effectively broke the four friends up, and van Heeck was obliged to leave Rome, embarking on a tour of numerous European countries. He went first to Siena, Pisa and Florence, then to Milan and Turin, where he met Giovanni Botero at the Court of Charles Emmanuel I, Duke of Savoy. Later he crossed the Alps and went to England, Norway, France, Poland, Germany and Bohemia.

While van Heeck was travelling, Federico Cesi sent him money regularly, to buy rare books on alchemy and the natural sciences, which were then added to his collection the Accademia dei Lincei. As well as collecting books, objects and rare plants for the Accademia's collections, van Heeck was also a kind of roving ambassador, telling educated men in each city about the group's work and publicising its activities to win the sympathy of the powerful and the learned. During his travels, he was attacked by robbers and forced to swallow his membership ring of the Accademia in order to prevent it from falling into the hands of his attackers. (Note: His many observations on his travels are held today in the Bibliothèque Interuniversitaire de Montpellier under the title Fructus itineris ad Septentrionales.)

After several months on the road, he eventually found a place in Prague at the court of Emperor Rudolf II, an enlightened and generous man who was interested in the research of the Accademia dei Lincei. Rudolf's court was a major international centre for scholars and researchers in many fields, and he owned one of the largest cabinets of curiosities ever assembled. He had been patron to Tycho Brahe until the latter's death in 1601, and at the time of van Heeck's arrival, was still patron to Johan Kepler.

== The supernova of 1604 ==
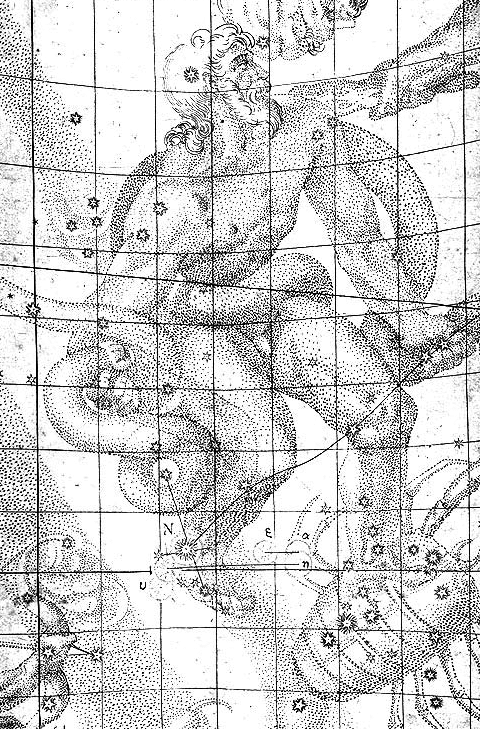
Kepler's illustration of the 1604 supernova in the foot of Ophiuchus (the serpent-bearer)

In October 1604, a new star was seen. By night, it was the brightest star in the sky, and it was visible during the day as well for more than three weeks, before eventually dimming. Both Lodovico delle Colombe (Note: Delle Colombe's book was entitled Discorso di L. Delle Colombe. Nel quale si dimostra, che la nuova Stella apparita l'ottobre passato 1604 nel Sagittario non è Cometa, ne Stella generata, o creata di nuovo, ne apparente) and Kepler (Note: Kepler's book was entitled De Stella Nova) published their accounts of the new star in 1606. Van Heeck was ready to publish before them, sending his manuscript of De Nova Stella Disputatio ('Discussion of the New Star') to Federico Cesi in Rome in January 1605.

The critical question for all three writers was whether the new phenomenon could be explained within the generally-accepted model of the universe, known as the Aristotelian model or the Ptolmaic system. This held that the stars were remote, fixed in their positions and unchanging, while movement and variance were associated with the planets, closer to the Earth. An unusual event in the sky might take place close to the earth, and could therefore be explained within the standard cosmological model. However, if it took place beyond the planets, this indicated that the stars, contrary to what was commonly believed, could not be fixed in a 'firmament'. Astronomers (still working with the unaided naked eye at this time) took measurements of parallax to determine whether an object was near the earth or far away from it.

Cesi believed that the Accademia needed to publish something of scientific significance in order to establish its scholarly credibility, and that a book from van Heeck which reaffirmed orthodox Catholic positions would both remove suspicions about the group's activities and pave the way for his return to Rome. Van Heeck's theses however posed a number of problems. He critiqued twelve positions put forward by other astronomers on the origins and location of supernovae. Claiming to use the measurement techniques developed by Tycho Brahe, he concluded that the supernova of 1604 showed no sign of parallax, which meant that the event could not have taken place near the earth, among the planets, but must have been located much further away, among the 'fixed' stars of the firmament or perhaps even further beyond. In this, he agreed with Tycho Brahe and other recent astronomers. However he reconciled this conclusion with the Aristotelian model by arguing that the apparently new star was not new at all; while permanent, like other stars, it was only occasionally visible for special reasons. He went further, accusing those who argued for a fluid heaven of writing contrary to Holy Writ, and attacking Tycho Brahe for his religious beliefs as well as for his purported scientific errors. Broadening his polemic against all erroneous ideas, he attacked Protestantism, thereby drawing Kepler into his argument. The language and tone of van Heeck's text was most intemperate. He berated the 'babbling new Philosophers' for their 'profane ignorance' and 'stupid ostentation' in departing from Aristotle.

Cesi greatly esteemed Kepler, and therefore edited van Heeck's text, removing anything hostile to him or to other astronomers. He also removed much of the defence of the Aristotelian cosmology, as it was important for the Accademia to align itself to new astronomical discoveries and not become entrenched in defending Aristotle. He then had the pamphlet published without the lynx emblem of the Accademia on its frontispiece. Van Heeck was furious at these editorial changes, which had been undertaken without his knowledge or permission.

== Later life ==
Van Heeck's correspondence with Cesi in 1604 and 1605 suggest that he was experiencing some kind of crisis of confidence about his relationship with the other Lincei. He wrote at one point of marrying and not returning to Rome, but Cesi prevailed on him to come back. In April 1605 they asked him to prepare a new book attacking heresy, which was perhaps more suited to his interests at the time. In October 1605 he returned to Italy, but went to Rome only briefly in 1606 before leaving Italy again.

In 1608 he was in Madrid, where he had apparently gone to see the famous Mexican herbarium in the Escorial. He probably practised medicine there, and wrote a treatise entitled Politeia Catholica de Bono et Malo cum Civil Antidote, now lost. In 1610, Federico Cesi's father died and this meant that the members of the Accademia could associate more freely. It is perhaps significant that despite this, van Heeck still did not return to his friends in Rome. Although he continued to contribute to the work of the Accademia, this was on a more sporadic basis and the apparent crisis in his nerves diminished his involvement.

One of the Accademia's original founders, Anastasio de Filiis, had died in 1608 and Cesi invited the elderly and highly esteemed Giambattista della Porta to join in his place. This helped the Accademia to re-establish itself and gave it greatly enhanced respectability after the mistrust it had experienced in its earlier years. The next person to join after Della Porta was Galileo Galilei.

Nothing more is known about him until 26 July 1614, when he made a fleeting appearance in Rome, accompanied by Stelluti, for an academic conference on the Greek and Latin languages. A note, probably from 1615, by the Linceian Theophilus Müller at the end of his book 'De Animalibus' indicates that he visited van Heeck in the abbey of Sant'Angelo in Capoccia. Van Heeck appeared to be in the grip of a persecution mania, and told him that the king of Spain was persecuting him and insisting that he marry his daughter. The very last known reference to him is in a minute from the 24 March 1616 meeting of the Accademia dei Lincei, which records that he was temporarily excluded from meetings until he was once again of sound mind. Nothing further is known about him.

== Selected works ==
- De nova stella disputatio. Aloisius Zannettus, Rome 1605
- Disputatio de peste et quare praecipue grassatur tot ab hinc annis in Belgio, Deventer 1605 ('Discourse on the Plague, From Whence It Came Why It Lasted So Many Years in The Netherlands')
- Itineraris de septentrionales fructus ('Fruits of a Journey in the North')
- De mundi pernicie et haereticorum insania, quae in hac mundi senecta apud Belgas maxima est ('On the Destruction of the World and the Mania of Heretics, which in This Age of the World is Greatest in the Netherlands')
