= Francesco Stelluti =

Italian polymath

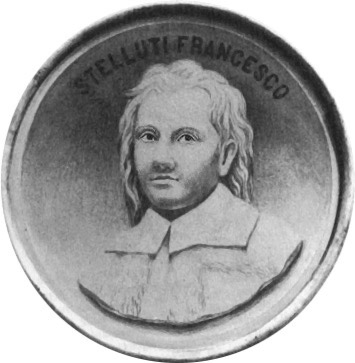
- Born: 12 January 1577; Fabriano, Italy
- Died: November 1652 (aged 75); Rome, Italy
- Occupation: Polymath
- Parent(s): Bernardino Stelluti and Lucrezia Corradini

Francesco Stelluti (12 January 1577, in Fabriano – November 1652, in Rome) was an Italian polymath who worked in the fields of mathematics, microscopy, literature, and astronomy. Along with Federico Cesi, Anastasio de Filiis and Johannes van Heeck, he founded the Accademia dei Lincei in August 1603.

== Early life ==
Francesco was the son of Bernardino Stelluti and his wife Lucrezia Corradini. He went to Rome at a young age to study law and after completing his studies, he began to work in law, which he practised all his life, while also dedicating himself to literary and scientific studies.

In the Accademia, he was first appointed Grand Counsellor, with the task of teaching mathematics, geometry and astronomy to the other members. Later, he was appointed proponitor (lecturer) in machines and mathematical instruments, and provisor (supervisor) and calculator of the motions of the stars. His pseudonym in the Accademia was Tardigrado (slow stepper), reflecting his character as a quiet, studious man, careful and versatile. His protecting star was Saturn, from which he was said to draw his capacity for reflection and speculation, as well as his motto, Quo serius eo citius (“the slower, the swifter”). In 1604, he authored the Logicae Physicae et Metaphysicae Brevissimum Compendium.

Like his companions, he faced hostility from the family of Prince Cesi because of the creation of the Accademia dei Lincei and was compelled to leave Rome for several years, going first to Fabriano and then to the Farnese court in Parma. He returned to Rome in 1609, and took an active role in the development of the Accademia. In 1610, he went to Naples with Cesi to establish a branch of the Accademia there, to be run by Giambattista della Porta and he also began his life's work of editing the “Tesoro Messicano”, which contained the records gathered in Mexico by naturalist Francisco Hernández de Toledo in the 1570s. In 1612, he was elected procuratore generale of the Accademia.

== Later life ==
In 1625, he and Federico Cesi printed in broadsheet (or broadside) form the work Apiarium in 1625, marking the first published microscopic revelations of biological structures. The broadsheet contained an illustration of three bees - a design of three bees was the family crest of the new pope, Urban VIII.

Stelluti's Persio tradotto in verso sciolto e dichiarato ("[Works of Aulus] Persius [Flaccus] translated into light verse and annotated [lit. 'declared' in the sense of 'remarked/commented upon']"), published in Rome in 1630, is the first book published in codex form to contain images of organisms viewed through the microscope.

Subsequently, in 1637 he published a work on fossilised wood, apparently also with the aid of magnifying instruments and he finally published the “Tesoro Messicano” in 1651. The Tesoro Messicano (“Mexican Treasure”) or more precisely the Rerum Medicarum Novae Hispaniae Thesaurus, was the final work of the Accademia. It represented nearly half a century of collaborative work among Accademia members. After the death of Prince Cesi, Stelluti carried forward the work of the Accademia, and, in particular, ensured that the long and sometimes poorly organised project to create this book was brought to fruition. The work was not only very long, but full of an extraordinary number of illustrations - 800 in the first 899 pages.

After Prince Cesi's death, Stelluti was steadfast in preventing the heritage of the Accademia from being lost and he remained close to his friend's widow. After her death, he was apparently in the service of Livia della Rovere for a short time.

He outlived all the other founders of the Accademia, and died in Rome in 1653, while a guest in the palace of Duke Paolo Sforza, husband of Olimpia Cesi, Prince Cesi's daughter.
