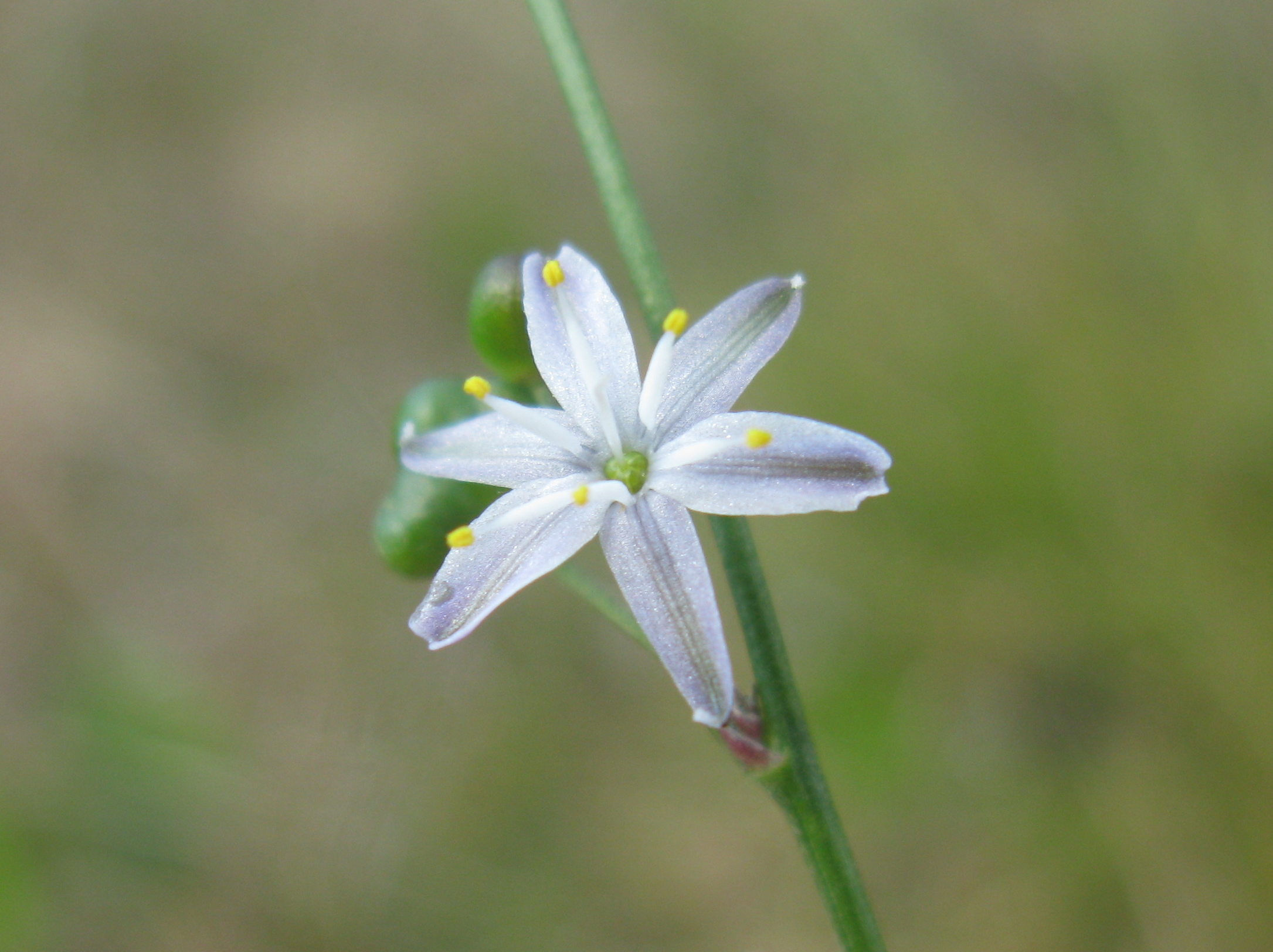

Scientific classification
- Kingdom: Plantae
- Clade: Tracheophytes
- Clade: Angiosperms
- Clade: Monocots
- Order: Asparagales
- Family: Asphodelaceae
- Subfamily: Hemerocallidoideae
- Genus: Caesia
- Species: C. parviflora

Binomial name
- Caesia parviflora R.Br.

= Caesia parviflora =

Species of flowering plant

Caesia parviflora, the pale grass lily, is a species of flowering plant in the family Asphodelaceae, subfamily Hemerocallidoideae, native to Australia, being found in New South Wales, Queensland, Victoria, Tasmania, South Australia and Western Australia.

This is a small plant up to 50 centimeters tall, found in heath, woodland and dry sclerophyll forest, usually near grasses. It often grows on sandstone-based soils. The lily-like flower is about 1.2 centimeters wide and has three grey or purple stripes on each petal. Flowering occurs in spring and summer.

The original specimen was collected in Sydney, dated 16 October 1803. In 1810, the species appeared in Prodromus Florae Novae Hollandiae, authored by the prolific Scottish botanist, Robert Brown. The generic name honours Federico Cesi, a 17th-century Italian naturalist. The specific epithet parviflora translates to "small flowered".

At least three subspecies are recognised:

- Caesia parviflora var. parviflora, with white flowers
- Caesia parviflora var. vittata, with blue flowers
- Caesia parviflora var. minor, less than 20 cm tall, with blue or white flowers. This subspecies is considered endangered.
