= Anastasio de Filiis =

Anastasio de Filiis (Terni 1577 - Naples 1608), together with Prince Federico Cesi, the Dutch physician Johannes van Heeck and Francesco Stelluti, was one of the four founding members of the Accademia dei Lincei. He wrote a number of works on natural science and tables of astronomical observations which have since been lost.

== Family background ==
The de Filiis family were related to the family of the Cesi. In the mid-fifteenth century, Carlo de Filiis de Caesis, Count Palatine, moved from Cesi to Terni and secured from the Holy Roman Emperor the right to be mayor and notary of the town for himself and his successors.

Anastasio's father, Paul de Filiis, was the standard-bearer of the city, but nothing is known of his mother. Anastasio was the oldest of three brothers, one of whom, Angelo (1583–1624), became librarian of the Accademia dei Lincei and wrote a dedicatory preface to Galileo's Letters on Sunspots. Nothing is known of the other brother, Valentino.

== Activities with the Lincei ==
In 1603, together with Prince Cesi and his other friends, he co-founded the Accademia dei Lincei. He chose 'Eclipsatus' as his club pseudonym, an eclipsed moon as his personal emblem, and 'spero lucem' ('I hope for light') as his personal motto. This was perhaps a reference to the fact that he was the least educated of the four, and indeed did not even speak Latin, which was essential for any kind of scholarly work. He relied on his friends for accounts of material they had read, but Cesi encouraged him by emphasising the importance of close observation of phenomena around him, rather than reliance on written material. Despite his lack of Latin, he was also made secretary to the academy, responsible for recording all its proceedings in the Gesta Lyncaeorum. Because of his interest in astronomy and in the construction of mechanical devices, Cesi asked him to make an astrolabe, which he finished on 22 October 1603.

Like other early members, Anastasio de Filiis was forced to leave Rome in the years following the founding of the Lincei because of pressure from the Duke of Acquasparta, father of Prince Cesi, who suspected the four young men of indulging in magical practices and immoral behaviour. Among them, Anastasio was the one with whom the Duke was least at odds, and it was through him that the Duke was able to keep track of his errant son. The correspondence between the four young men reveals that in those years (1603–1606), the de Filiis often moved around, living alternately in Terni and Rome. Even when away from Rome, Anastasio continued to act as secretary of the academy. In 1606, perhaps drawing on the lessons of Giambattista della Porta, he left for Naples, where he died in 1608.

== Works ==
Of his works, which were among the lost manuscripts of the Biblioteca Albani, only two titles are known: 'De arcanis naturalibus' and 'Novae saecundorum motuum tabulae ab Eclipsato Lyncaeo delineatae' .
