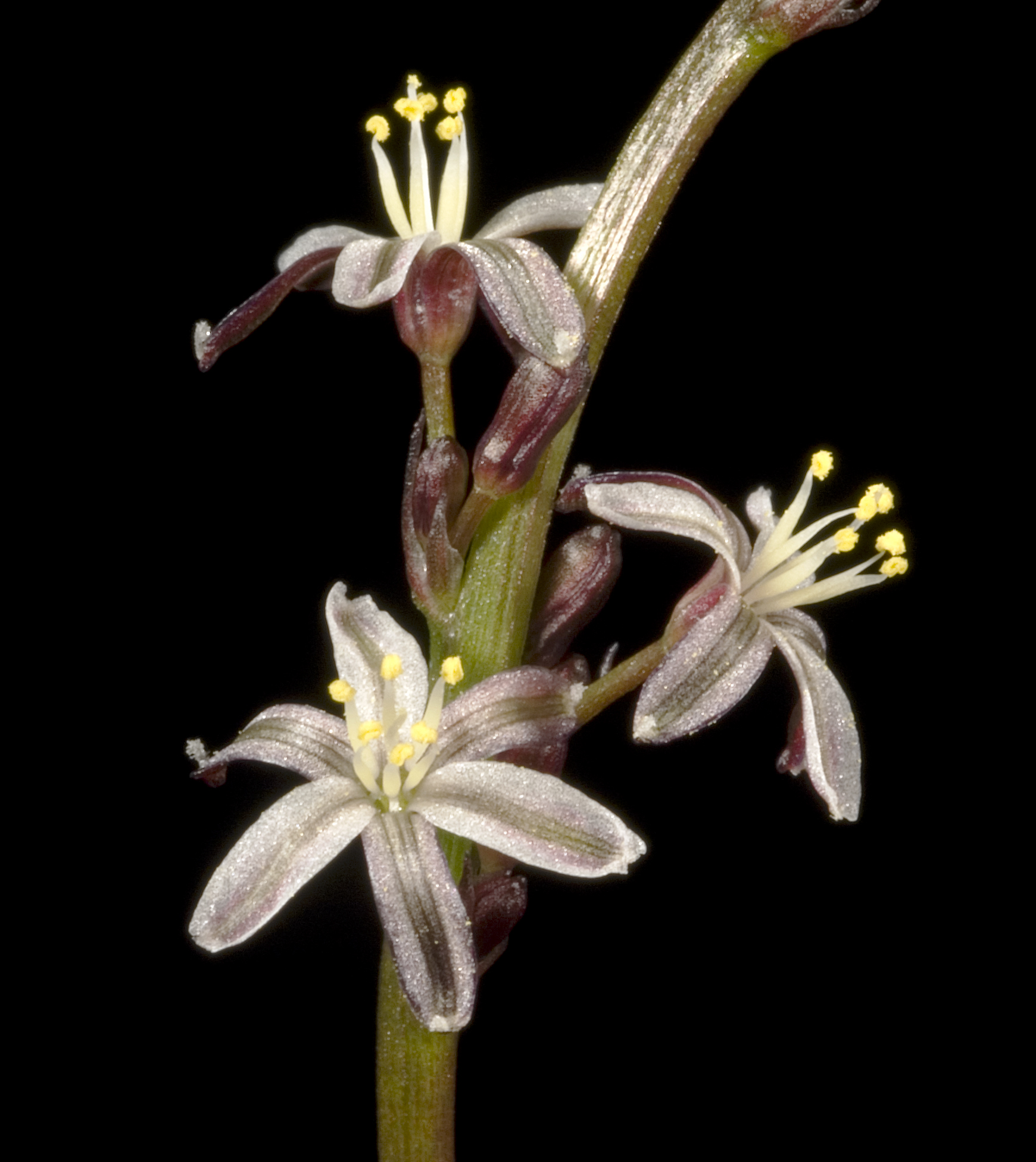

Scientific classification
- Kingdom: Plantae
- Clade: Tracheophytes
- Clade: Angiosperms
- Clade: Monocots
- Order: Asparagales
- Family: Asphodelaceae
- Subfamily: Hemerocallidoideae
- Genus: Caesia
- Species: C. micrantha

Binomial name
- Caesia micrantha Lindl.

= Caesia micrantha =

Species of flowering plant

Caesia micrantha (common name – pale grass-lily) is a species of flowering plant in the subfamily Hemerocallidaceae native to Western Australia.

== Description ==
Caesia micrantha has fibrous roots. The leaves are 15 to 65 cm long, with the leaf blade being 3 to 10 mm wide, and the sheath sometimes persisting as fibres. The inflorescence is 25–60 cm with few to many branches and lower bracts which are up to 35 cm long. The flower clusters contain from 1 to 4 flowers and are often paired. The capsule generally has three lobes which are 2.5 to 5 mm wide, and the seeds are from 1.3 to 1.7 mm wide.

== Distribution and habitat ==
It grows on many different soil types and is widespread in the south-west of Western Australia both on the ranges and the coastal plain from Albany to Geraldton.

== Conservation status ==
Under Western Australian conservation law, it is listed as "Not Threatened".

== Taxonomy and etymology ==
In 1840, the species was first described by John Lindley The specific epithet, micrantha is an adjective derived from the Greek, mikros ("small" or "little") and anthos ("flower") meaning "having small flowers", or "small-flowered".
