= Music cipher =

Musical algorithm for encrypting and decrypting information

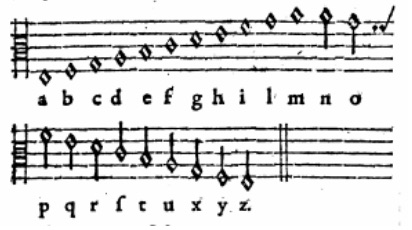
Giambattista della Porta's music cipher from De Furtivis Literarum Notis (1602).

In cryptography, a music cipher is an algorithm for the encryption of a plaintext into musical symbols or sounds. Music-based ciphers are related to, but not the same as musical cryptograms. The latter were systems used by composers to create musical themes or motifs to represent names based on similarities between letters of the alphabet and musical note names, such as the BACH motif, whereas music ciphers were systems typically used by cryptographers to hide or encode messages for reasons of secrecy or espionage.

== Types ==
There are a variety of different types of music ciphers as distinguished by both the method of encryption and the musical symbols used. Regarding the former, most are simple substitution ciphers with a one-to-one correspondence between individual letters of the alphabet and a specific musical note. There are also historical music ciphers that utilize homophonic substitution (one-to-many), polyphonic substitution (many-to-one), compound cipher symbols, and/or cipher keys; all of which can make the enciphered message more difficult to break. Regarding the type of symbol used for substitution, most music ciphers utilize the pitch of a musical note as the primary cipher symbol. Since there are fewer notes in a standard musical scale (e.g., seven for diatonic scales and twelve for chromatic scales) than there are letters of the alphabet, cryptographers would often combine the note name with additional characteristics––such as octave register, rhythmic duration, or clef––to create a complete set of cipher symbols to match every letter. However, there are some music ciphers which rely exclusively on rhythm instead of pitch or on relative scale degree names instead of absolute pitches.

=== Musical steganography ===
Music ciphers often have both cryptographic and steganographic elements. Simply put, encryption is scrambling a message so that it is unreadable; steganography is hiding a message so no one knows it is even there. Most practitioners of music ciphers believed that encrypting text into musical symbols gave it added security because, if intercepted, most people would not even suspect that the sheet music contained a message. However, as Francesco Lana de Terzi notes, this is usually not because the resulting cipher melody appears to be a normal piece of music, but rather because so few people know enough about music to realize it is not ("ma gl'intelligenti di musica sono poci"). A message can also be visually hidden within a page of music without actually being a music cipher. William F. Friedman embedded a secret message based on Francis Bacon's cipher into a sheet music arrangement of Stephen Foster's "My Old Kentucky Home" by visually altering the appearance of the note stems. Another steganographic strategy is to musically encrypt a plaintext, but hide the message-bearing notes within a larger musical score that requires some visual marker that distinguishes them from the meaningless null-symbol notes (e.g., the cipher melody is only in the tenor line or only the notes with stems pointing down).

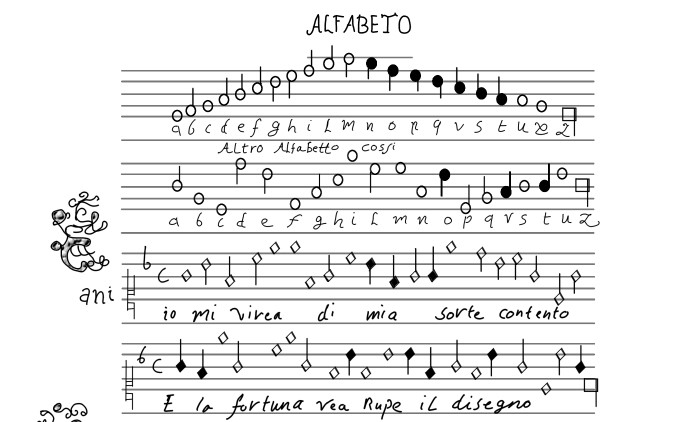
Madrigal score Amadi (1588)

The cipher manuscript from Agostino Amadi there is a musical score in 41v with a pseudo-letter ciphered in it, which is an imaginary letter that Venice writes to Charles V. Italian historian Paolo Preto. "...The emperor sent to prince Gritti, with whom he had been familiar for a long time, a music score that looked like a madrigal....The prince summoned Willaert and the other musicians and asked them to play the melody sent to them by emperor Charles V. When Willaert and the others carefully studied the score, they were unable to play it and confessed they could not understand it."

== Diatonic substitution ciphers ==
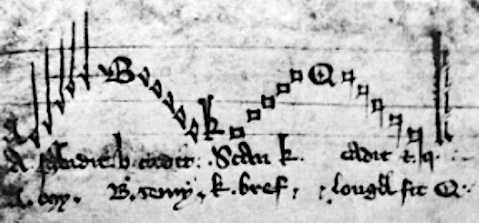
Music cipher from "The Sermon Booklets of Friar Nicholas Philip" (1436).

Diatonic music ciphers utilize only the seven basic note names of the diatonic scale: A, B, C, D, E, F, and G. While some systems reuse the same seven pitches for multiple letters (e.g., the pitch A can represent the letters A, H, O, or V), most algorithms combine these pitches with other musical attributes to achieve a one-to-one mapping. Perhaps the earliest documented music cipher is found in a manuscript from 1432 called "The Sermon Booklets of Friar Nicholas Philip." Philip's cipher uses only five pitches, but each note can appear with one of four different rhythmic durations, thus providing twenty distinct symbols. A similar cipher appears in a 15th-century British anonymous manuscript as well as in a much later treatise by Giambattista della Porta.

In editions of the same treatise (De Furtivis Literarum Notis), Porta also presents a simpler cipher which is much more well-known. Porta's music cipher maps the letters A through M (omitting J and K) onto a stepwise, ascending, octave-and-a-half scale of whole notes (semibreves); with the remainder of the alphabet (omitting V and W) onto a descending scale of half notes (minims). Since alphabetic and scalar sequences are in such close step with each other, this is not a very strong method of encryption, nor are the melodies it produces very natural. Nevertheless, one finds slight variations of this same method employed throughout the 17th and 18th centuries by Daniel Schwenter (1602), John Wilkins (1641), Athanasius Kircher (1650), Kaspar Schott (1655), Philip Thicknesse (1722), and even the British Foreign Office (ca. 1750).

== Chromatic substitution ciphers ==
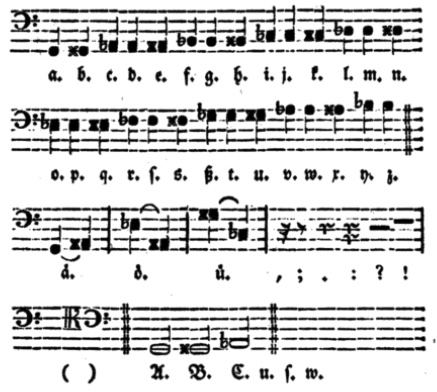
Music Cipher attributed to Michael Haydn (1808)

Music ciphers based on the chromatic scale provide a larger pool of note names to match with letters of the alphabet. Applying sharps and flats to the seven diatonic pitches yields twenty-one unique cipher symbols. Since this is obviously still less than a standard alphabet, chromatic ciphers also require either a reduced letter set or additional features (e.g., octave register or duration). Most chromatic ciphers were developed by composers in the 20th Century when fully chromatic music itself was more common. A notable exception is a cipher attributed to the composer Michael Haydn (brother of the more famous Joseph Haydn). Haydn's algorithm is one of the most comprehensive with symbols for thirty-one letters of the German alphabet, punctuations (using rest signs), parentheses (using clefs), and word segmentation (using bar lines). However, because many of the pitches are enharmonic equivalents, this cipher can only be transmitted as visual steganography, not via musical sound. For example, the notes C♯ and D♭ are spelled differently, but they sound the same on a piano. As such, if one were listening to an enciphered melody, it would not be possible to hear the difference between the letters K and L. Furthermore, the purpose of this cipher was clearly not to generate musical themes that could pass for normal music. The use of such an extreme chromatic scale produces wildly dissonant, atonal melodies that would have been obviously atypical for Haydn's time.

=== 20th-century ciphers ===
Although chromatic ciphers did not seem to be favored by cryptographers, there are several 20th-century composers who developed systems for use in their own music: Arthur Honegger, Maurice Duruflé, Norman Cazden, Olivier Messiaen, and Jacques Chailley. Similar to Haydn's cipher, most likewise match the alphabet sequentially onto a chromatic scale and rely on octave register to extend to twenty-six letters. Only Messiaen's appears to have been thoughtfully constructed to meet the composer's aesthetic goals. Although he also utilized different octave registers, the letters of the alphabet are not mapped in scalar order and also have distinct rhythmic values. Messiaen called his musical alphabet the langage communicable, and used it to embed extra-musical text throughout his organ work Méditations sur le Mystère de la Sainte Trinité.

=== 21st-century ciphers ===
A system that translates the Bible into music form was extensively developed by the artist John Three Sixteen in the 2020s. Each piece is originated by translating the Greek Bible letters into a musical form various musical scales. Various methodologies are used to maintain variety, the musicality of which develops from repeated phrasing from repeated or similar words.

== Compound motivic ciphers ==
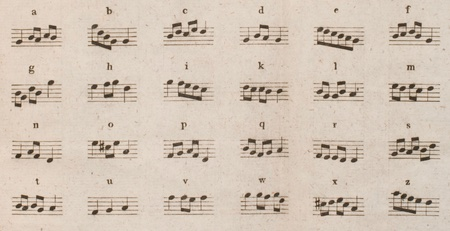
Motivic music cipher by Johann Bücking (1804)

In a compound substitution cipher, each single plaintext letter is replaced by a block of multiple cipher symbols (e.g., 'a' = EN or 'b' = WJU). Similarly, there are compound music ciphers in which each letter is represented by a musical motive with two or more notes. In the case of the former, the compound symbols are to make frequency analysis more difficult; in the latter, the goal is to make the output more musical. For example, in 1804, Johann Bücking devised a compound cipher which generates musical compositions in the form of a minuet in the key of G Major. Each letter of the alphabet is replaced by a measure of music consisting of a stylistically typical motive with three to six notes. After the plaintext is enciphered, additional pre-composed measures are appended to the beginning and end to provide a suitable musical framing. A few years earlier, Wolfgang Amadeus Mozart appears to have employed a similar technique (with much more sophisticated musical motives), although more likely intended as a parlor game than an actual cipher. Since the compound symbols are musically meaningful motives, these ciphers could also be considered similar to codes.

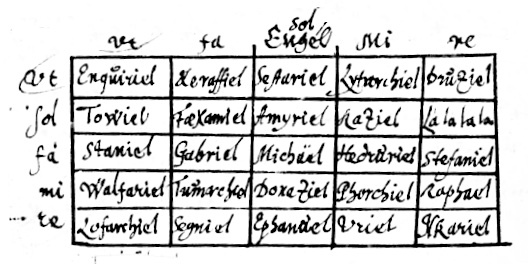
Polybius square music cipher designed by Friedrich von Öttingen-Wallerstein (ca. 1600)

Friedrich von Öttingen-Wallerstein proposed a different type of compound music cipher modeled after a polybius square cipher. Öttingen-Wallerstein used a 5x5 grid containing the letters of the alphabet (hidden within the names of angels). Instead of indexing the rows and columns with coordinate numbers, he used the solfege syllables Ut, Re, Mi Fa, and Sol (i.e., the first five degrees of a diatonic scale). Each letter, therefore, becomes a two-note melodic motive. This same cipher appears in treatises by Gustavus Selenus (1624) and Johann Balthasar Friderici (1665) (but without credit to the earlier version of Öttingen-Wallerstein).

== Music ciphers with keys ==
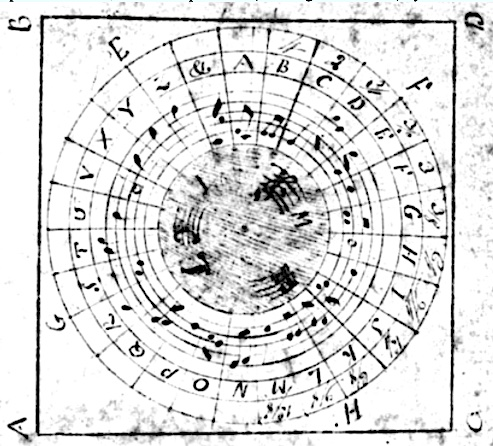
Music Cipher Wheel from anonymous 18th-century manuscript, Port-Lesney, France

Because Öttingen-Wallerstein's cipher uses relative scale degrees, rather than fixed note names, it is effectively a polyalphabetic cipher. The same enciphered message could be transposed to a different musical key––with different note names––and still retain the same meaning. The musical key literally becomes a cipher key (or cryptovariable), because the recipient needs that additional information to correctly decipher the melody. Öttingen-Wallerstein inserted rests as cipherkey markers to indicate when a new musical key was needed to decrypt the message.

Francesco Lana de Terzi used a more conventional text-string cryptovariable, to add security to a very straightforward 'Porta-style' music cipher (1670). Similar to a Vigenère cipher, a single-letter cipher key shifts the position of the plaintext alphabet in relation to the sequence musical cipher symbols; a multi-letter key word shifts the musical scale for each letter of the text in a repeating cycle.

A more elaborate cipherkey algorithm was found in an anonymous manuscript in Port-Lesney, France, most likely from the mid-18th century. The so-called 'Port-Lesney' music cipher uses a mechanical device known as an Alberti cipher disk There are two rotating disks: the outer disk contains two concentric rings (one with time signatures and the other with letters of the alphabet); the inner disk has a ring of compound musical symbols, and a small inner circle with three different clef signs. The disks are rotated to align the letters of the alphabet with compound musical symbols to encrypt the message. When the melody is written out on a music staff, the corresponding clef and time signature are added to the beginning to indicate the cipher key (which the recipient aligns on their disk to decipher the message). This particular music cipher was apparently very popular, with a dozen variations (in French, German, and English) appearing throughout the 18th and 19th centuries.

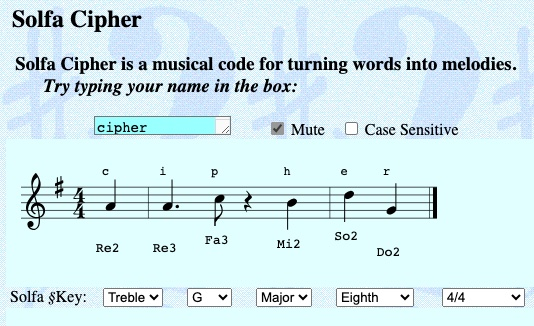
Solfa cipher interface

The more recent Solfa Cipher combines some of the above cryptovariable techniques. As the name suggests, Solfa Cipher uses relative solfege degrees (like Öttingen-Wallerstein) rather than fixed pitches, which allows the same encrypted message to be transposable to different musical keys. Since there are only seven scale degrees, these are combined with a rhythmic component to create enough unique cipher symbols. However, instead of absolute note lengths (e.g., quarter note, half note, etc.) that are employed in most music ciphers, Solfa Cipher uses relative metric placement. This type of tonal-metric cipher makes the encrypted melody both harder to break and more musically natural (i.e. similar to common-practice tonal melodies). To decrypt a cipher melody, the recipient needs to know in which musical key and with what rhythmic unit the original message was encrypted, as well as the clef sign and metric location of the first note. The cipher key could also be transmitted as a date by using Solfalogy, a method of associating each unique date with a tone and modal scale. To further confound interceptors, the transcribed sheet music could be written with a decoy clef, key signature, and time signature. The musical output, however, is a relatively normal, simple, singable tune in comparison to the disjunct, atonal melodies produced by fixed-pitch substitution ciphers. Solfa Cipher melodies have been featured by the bands 21 Pilots and The Smile and have been incorporated as a plot devices in fictional works.

== Sources ==
- Alberti, Leon Battista. 1467. De Cifris. Biblioteca Nazionale Marciana. Cod. Marc. Lat. XIV 32 (4702) f. 1r. (sec. XVI).
- Arnold, George. 1862. The Magician's Own Book. New York: Dick & Fitzgerald.
- Bacon, Francis. 1605. The Proficience and Advancement of Learning Divine and Humane. Oxford
- Belloni, Gabriella. 1982. "Conoscenza magica e ricerca scientifica in G. B. Della Porta". Criptologia / Giovan Battista Della Porta. Rome: Centro internazionale di studi umanistici
- Bernard, Francis. c.1400. Sloan MS 351, British Library.
- Bertini, A. 1811. Stigmatographie ou l'art d'écrire avec des points. France: Martinet.
- Boethius, Anicius Manlius Severinus. c.524. De Institutione Musica. Translated by Calvin Bower, 1989, Fundamentals of Music (ed. C. Palisca), Yale University Press.
- Bücking, Johannn. J. 1804. Anweisung zur geheimen Correpondenz. Wolfenbüttel: Heinrich Georg Albreht.
- Cazden, Norman. 1961a. "Staff Notation as a Non-Musical Communications Code," Perspectives of New Music, Vol. 5, No. 1, 113–128
- Cazden, Norman. 1961b. "How to Compose Non-Music," Perspectives of New Music, Vol. 5, No. 2, 287–296
- Chailley, Jacques. 1981. "Anagrammes Musicales Et "langages Communicables"." Revue De Musicologie 67, no. 1: 69-80. doi:10.2307/928141.
- Champour, MM. de and François Malepeyre. 1856. Nouveau manuel complet de la fabrication des encres telles. A la Librairie encyclopédique de Roret.
- Code, David Løberg. 2023. "Can musical encryption be both? A survey of music-based ciphers." Cryptologia Volume 47 - Issue 4, https://doi.org/10.1080/01611194.2021.2021565
- Daverio, John. 2002. Crossing Paths: Schubert, Schumann, and Brahms. Oxford University Press.
- Djossa, Christina Ayele. 2018. "With Music Cryptography, Composers Can Hide Messages in Their Melodies," Atlas Obscura. https://www.atlasobscura.com/articles/musical-cryptography-codes
- Duruflé, Maurice. 1942. Prélude et fugue sur le nom d'Alain, Op. 7.
- Écorcheville, Jules. 1909. "Homage à Joseph Haydn," Revue musicale S.I.M. Société internationale de musique. https://gallica.bnf.fr/ark:/12148/bpt6k5589273s/f51.item
- Ernst, Thomas. 1996. “Schwarzweisse Magie. Der Schlussel zum dritten Buch der Steganographia des Trithemius.” Daphnis 25, Heft 1.
- Friderici, Johann Balthasar. 1665. Cryptographia. https://www.digitale-sammlungen.de/de/view/bsb10897282?page=193
- Gale, John. 1796. Gale's Cabinet of Knowledge. W. Kemmish.
- Godwin, Francis. 1638. The Man in the Moone or A Discourse of a Voyage Thither by Domingo Gonsales. John Norton.
- Guyot, Edme Gilles and Guillaume Germain Guyot. 1769. Recreations Sur Les Nombres. Gueffier.
- Honegger, Arthur. 1928. Homage à Albert Roussel, H.69. Editions Salabert.
- Hooper, William. 1794. Rational Recreations. B. Law and Son.
- Jacob, Paul Lacroix. 1858. La cryptographie: ou, L'art d'écrire en chiffres. Adolphe Delahays.
- Kircher, Athanasius. 1650. Musurgia Universalis. https://archive.org/details/bub_gb_97xCAAAAcAAJ/page/n389/mode/2up
- Klüber, Johann Ludwig. 1808. Kryptographik. Cottaschen. https://archive.org/details/bub_gb_lqRAAAAAcAAJ/page/n543/mode/2up
- Knowlson, James R. 1968. "A Note on Bishop Godwin's 'Man in the Moone:' The East Indies Trade Route and a 'Language' of Musical Notes." Modern Philology 65, no. 4: 357–61
- Kojima, Kenji. 2013. "Algorithmic Composition 'CiberTune'". http://kenjikojima.com/cipherTune/
- Lacombe, Jacques. 1792. Encyclopédie Méthodique: Des Amusemens Des Sciences Mathématiques Et Physiques. Chez Panckoucke
- Langlais, Jean. 1976. Deuxième symphonie pour orgue 'Alla Webern'
- McAvoy, Gary. 2021. The Vivaldi Cipher. Literati Editions.
- Meister, Aloys. 1906. Die Geheimschrift im Dienste der päpstlichen Kurie von ihren Anfängen bis zum Ende des XVI Jarhhunderts. Schöningh.
- Messiaen, Olivier. 1969. Méditations sur le mystère de la Sainte Trinité
- Mozart, Wolfgang Amadeus. 1787. Music manuscript MS 253–01, Bibliothèque Nationale de France. https://catalogue.bnf.fr/ark:/12148/cb424728984
- New York Public Library, Manuscripts and Archives Division. 1916. "My Old Kentucky Home, Good Night" The New York Public Library Digital Collections. https://digitalcollections.nypl.org/items/bd9b1e30-8607-0131-ac72-58d385a7b928
- Noguchi, Hideo. 1990. "Mozart – Musical Game in C K.516f" Mitteilungen der Internationalen Stiftung Mozarteum 38, 89–101.
- Öttingen-Wallerstein, Friedrich von. c.1600. Steganographia comitis. https://diglib.hab.de/wdb.php?dir=mss/56-aug-4f
- Philip, Nicholas. 1436. "The Sermon Booklets of Friar Nicholas Philip" MS Lat. th.d.I, Bodleian Library, Oxford.
- Porta, Giambattista della. 1602. De Furtivis Literarum Notis. https://books.google.com/books?id=UIZeAAAAcAAJ
- Porta, Giambattista della. 1606. De Occultis Literarum Notis. https://warburg.sas.ac.uk/pdf/noh4260.o11b2715108.pdf
- Prince, Jon and Mark Schmuckler. 2014. "The Tonal-Metric Hierarchy: A Corpus Analysis," Music Perception, 31(3), 254–270.
- Rettensteiner, Werigand. 1808. Biographische Skizze von Michael Haydn.
- Reuter, Christoph. 2013. "Namadeus – Play Your Name with Mozarts Game (KV 516f). Musicpsychologie, Bd.23, 154-159.
- Sams, Eric. 1966. "The Schumann Ciphers" The Musical Times, May 1966: 392–399.
- Schooling, John Holt. 1896. “Secrets in Cipher I-IV”, Pall Mall Magazine, viii, 119–29, 245–56, 452–62, 608–18
- Schott, Kaspar. 1655. Schola Steganographica. https://books.google.com/books?id=XQNCAAAAcAAJ
- Schwenter, Daniel. 1622. Steganologia & Steganographia Aucta. https://www.digitale-sammlungen.de/de/view/bsb11081558?page%3D325&sa=D&source=editors&ust=1623428284662000&usg=AOvVaw1bu67EE5i9j8vDKBVE6OjS
- Selenius, Gustavus. 1624. Cryptomenytices et Cryptographiae libri IX. https://books.google.com/books?id=gc9TAAAAcAAJ
- Shenten, Andrew. 2008. Olivier Messiaen's System of Signs: Notes Towards Understanding His Music. Ashgate Publishing.
- Sudre, François. 1866. Langue Musicale Universelle. http://www.ifost.org.au/~gregb/solresol/sudre-book.pdf
- Terzi, Francesco Lana de. 1670. Prodromo, ouero, Saggio di alcune inuentione nuoue, premesso all'arte maestra https://archive.org/details/prodromoouerosag00lana/page/n265/mode/1up
- Theun, Johann Christophe. 1772. Neue physikalische und mathematische Belustigungen, Bey Berhard Kletts
- Thicknesse, Philip. 1772. A treatise on the art of decyphering, and of writing in cypher. With an harmonic alphabet. W. Brown. https://archive.org/details/atreatiseonartd00thicgoog/page/n125/mode/2up
- Wilkins, John. 1641. Mercury, or The Secret and Swift Messenger. http://lcweb2.loc.gov/cgi-bin/ampage?collId=rbc3&fileName=rbc0001_2009fabyan19070page.db&recNum=168
