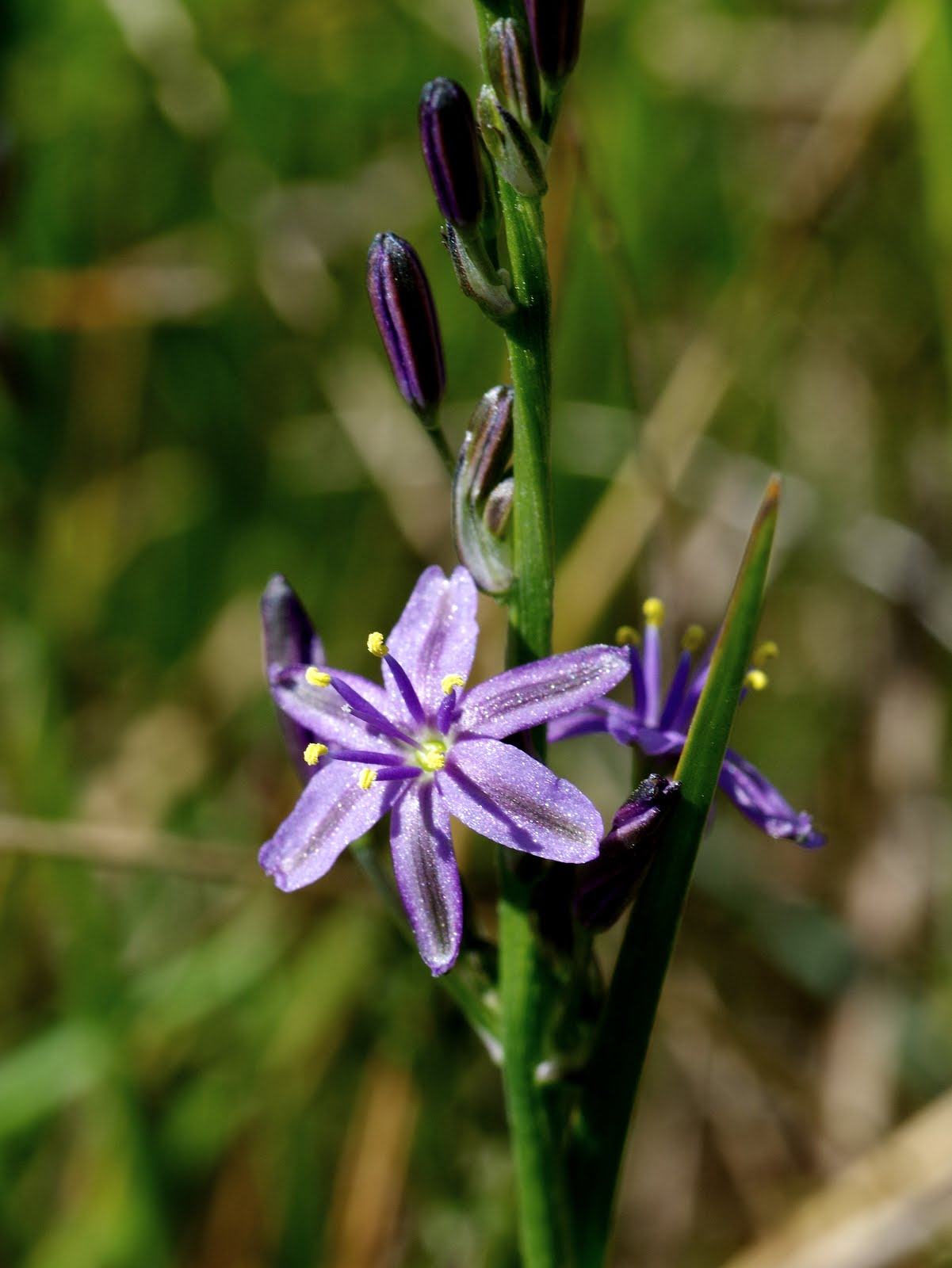

Scientific classification
- Kingdom: Plantae
- Clade: Tracheophytes
- Clade: Angiosperms
- Clade: Monocots
- Order: Asparagales
- Family: Asphodelaceae
- Subfamily: Hemerocallidoideae
- Genus: Caesia
- Species: C. calliantha

Binomial name
- Caesia calliantha R.J.F.Hend. (1987)
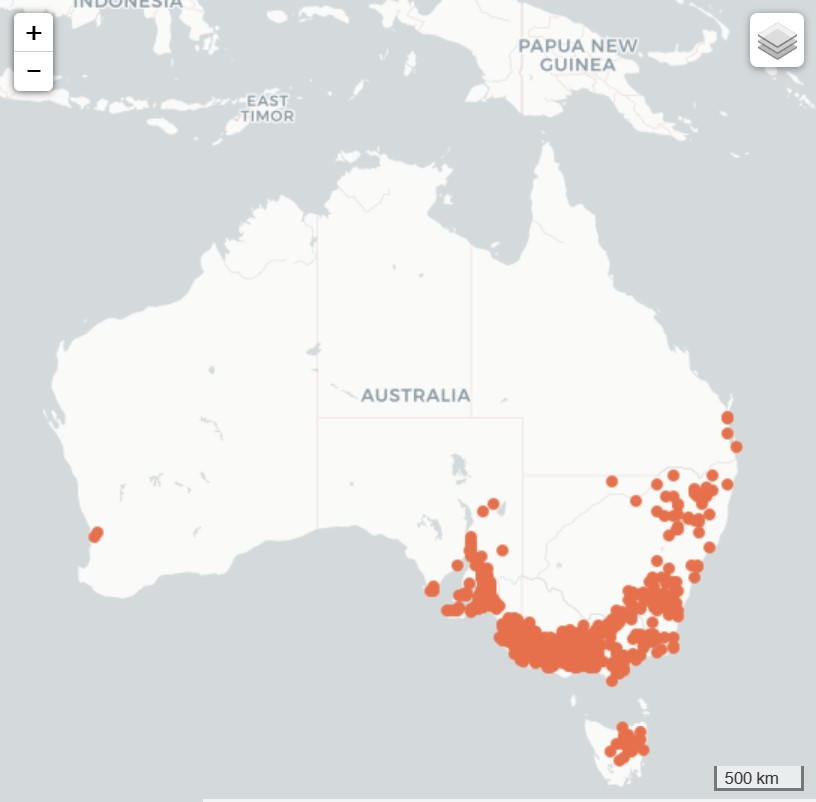

= Caesia calliantha =

Species of flowering plant

Caesia calliantha, commonly known as the blue grass lily or blue star lily, is a species of herbaceous flowering plant. It is a member of the Asphodelaceae family, subfamily Hemerocallidoideae, native to Australia found predominantly along the East coast in Victoria, New South Wales, South Australia and Tasmania.

== Description ==
Caesia calliantha is a tufted, perennial plant from the family Asphodelaceae. It has fibrous roots with broad spindle and tubers. The leaves grow in tufts at the base of the plant, appearing crowded and grass-like. The leaves are long and narrow, growing up to 30 cm (12 in) long and between 9–15 mm (0.35–0.59 in) wide. The inflorescence of C. calliantha comes from a tall erect stem, growing up to 50 cm (20 in) long, and emerged from the center of the basal leaves. At the top of the stem the flowers are arranged in a raceme, with the youngest flowers at the top. The flowers are in clusters of 1-3 and are a striking lilac blue to deep blue-purple colour. The flowers form a star-like shape made up of 6 petals between 6–9 mm (0.24–0.35 in) long, after flowering the petals become spirally twisted. The anthers of the flower are held up by 6 narrow tube stalks of same length. The fruit of C. calliantha are capsules. The capsules are small and rounded, between 5–7 mm (0.20–0.28 in) in diameter, and contain several seeds. The capsules start off yellow-green and once mature turn a brown colour, splitting along the seams to release the seeds.

== Habitat and distribution ==
Caesia calliantha is commonly found in Victoria, New South Wales, South Australia and Tasmania. C. calliantha is primarily found in grassy woodland vegetation types, in Tasmania this can be seen as its distributed across the midlands. It also has an ability to thrive in an array of ecological settings including heathlands and open forests, growing from sea level to sub-alpine altitudes. The C. calliantha typically prefers moist soils and will grow in full sun to semi-shaded areas.

== Differentiation ==
Caesia callianthacan be distinguished relatively easily from similar species. Caesia parvifolia is the most visually similar to C. calliantha, both with the same habitats, grass-like structures and star shaped blue flowers. The flowers on C. calliantha are larger, with C. parvifolia flowers being approximately 1.2 cm (0.47 in).

== Threats and conservation ==
C. calliantha has not been assessed at a national level in Australia, but in the state of Tasmania has been identified as a rare species under the threatened Threatened Species Protection Act 1995.

== History ==
Rodney John Francis Henderson first documented Caesia calliantha in 1987 in Flora of Australia, but C. calliantha had been incorrectly documented under Caesia vittata as early as 1810 by Robert Brown. The original founders of the C. calliantha was likely Aboriginal Australians as they made use of many plants with tubers as a food source.

C. calliantha has been reclassified over several decades to eventually be homed in the Asphodelaceae family, subfamily Hemerocallidoideae. From 2003 to 2017, under several APG systems, C. calliantha went from being in family Xanthorrhoeaeceae to Hemerocallidoideae to finally being classified as part of the Asphodelaceae family after a reclassification of Hemerocallidoideae as a subfamily in 2017 as part of the APG IV system.
