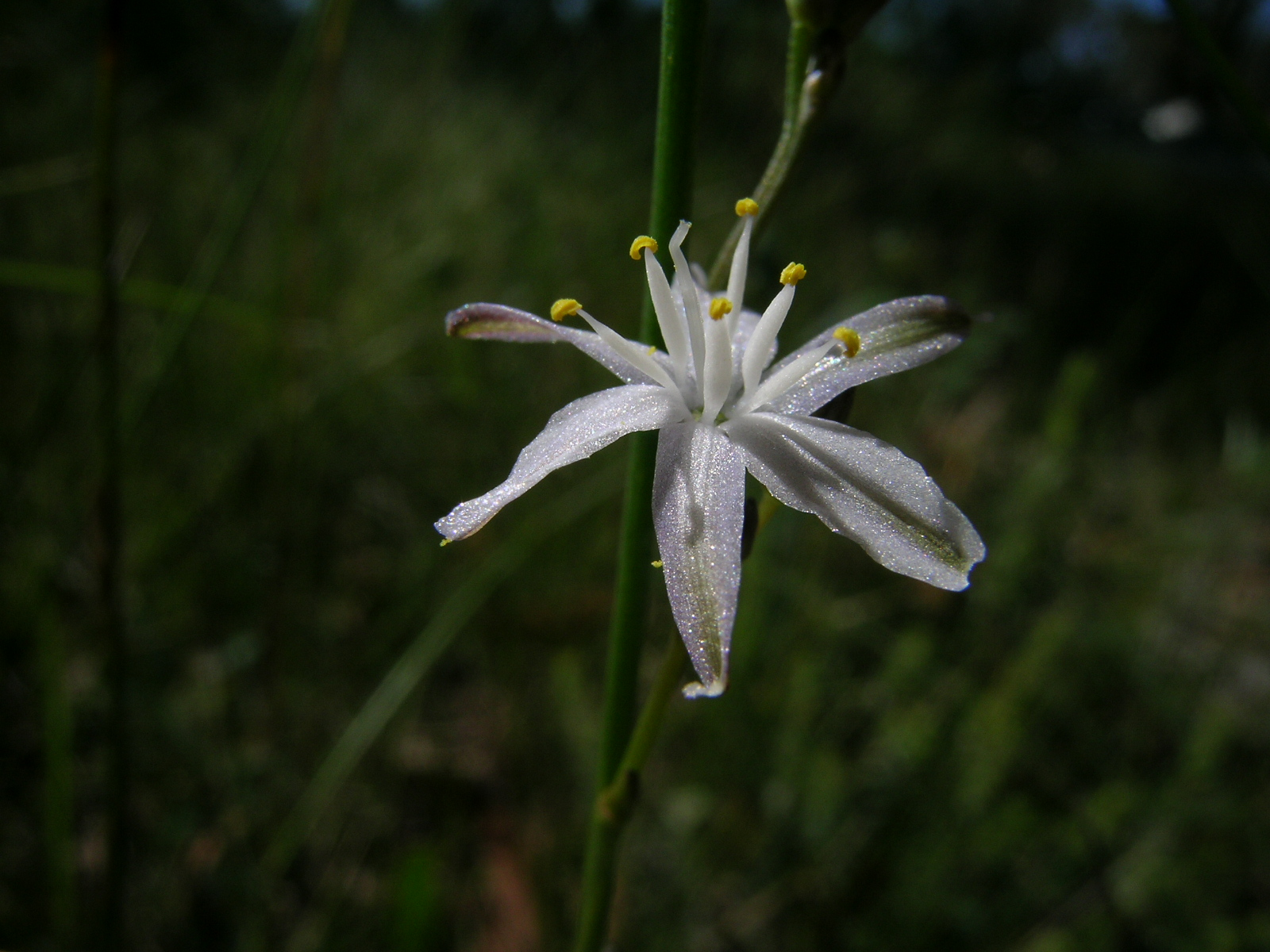
- Caesia parviflora

Scientific classification
- Kingdom: Plantae
- Clade: Tracheophytes
- Clade: Angiosperms
- Clade: Monocots
- Order: Asparagales
- Family: Asphodelaceae
- Subfamily: Hemerocallidoideae
- Genus: Caesia; R.Br.

Synonyms
- Bidwillia Herb.; Nanolirion Benth.

= Caesia =

Genus of flowering plants

Caesia is a genus of herbs in the family Asphodelaceae, subfamily Hemerocallidoideae, native to Australia, New Guinea, Madagascar and Southern Africa. The mostly 3-lobed seed capsules contain rounded black seeds. The genus was named in honour of Federico Cesi (1585–1630), an Italian scientist.

== Species ==
The following species are recognised in the genus Caesia:

- Caesia alpina Hook.f. - alpine grass-lily - New South Wales, Tasmania, Victoria
- Caesia arcuata T.D.Macfarl., Conran & C.J.French
- Caesia calliantha R.J.F.Hend. - blue grass-lily - New South Wales, Tasmania, Victoria, South Australia
- Caesia capensis (Bolus) Oberm. - Cape Province of South Africa
- Caesia chlorantha F.Muell. - New South Wales, Queensland, Western Australia
- Caesia contorta (L.f.) T.Durand & Schinz
- Caesia micrantha Lindl. - New South Wales, Tasmania, Victoria, South Australia, Western Australia, Queensland
- Caesia occidentalis R.Br. - Western Australia
- Caesia parviflora R.Br. - pale grass-lily - Queensland, New South Wales, Tasmania, Victoria, South Australia, Western Australia
- †Caesia rigidifolia F.Muell. - Queen Victoria Springs in Western Australia but extinct. Last recorded near Zanthus in 1875.
- Caesia sabulosa Boatwr. & J.C.Manning - Cape Province
- Caesia setifera Baker - Queensland, Western Australia, Northern Territory, New Guinea
- Caesia subulata Baker - Madagascar
- Caesia viscida Keighery - Western Australia
- Caesia walalbai A.T.Webb, Birch & R.L.Barrett
