= De Furtivis Literarum Notis =

1563 book on cryptography

De Furtivis Literarum Notis (On the Secret Symbols of Letters) is a 1563 book on cryptography written by Giambattista della Porta.

The book includes three sets of cypher discs for coding and decoding messages, a substitution cipher improving on the work of Al-Qalqashandi, and one of the earliest known music substitution ciphers.
