= Filippo Mariotti =

Italian politician and lawyer

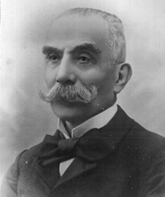
Filippo Mariotti

Filippo Mariotti (6 September 1833-25 June 1911) was an Italian politician and lawyer. He was deputy of the Kingdom of Italy from the 10th Legislature, then Senator of the Kingdom of Italy in the XVIII Legislature and Secretary General of the Ministry of Education.

== Early life ==
Filippo Mariotti was born in Apiro on 6 September 1833, as the second son of Raffaele, a coffee maker, and of the Romagna Anna Beltramelli. He studied at both Camerino and the Roman College in Rome. He geguated from the University of Camerino with a degree law.

== Political career ==
Member of Parliament from 1867 to 1892, then Senator, Secretary of Education (1887-1891) and State Councillor. On 15 November 1880, he asked the House for an "investigation into libraries".

In 1900, as the representative of the Government, he was part of the Commission that attended the exhumation of the remains of Giacomo Leopardi in Naples, together with Professor Enrico Cocchia, representing the Royal Academy of Archaeology and Letters of Naples, and Professor Francesco Moroncini, representing the Leopardi family.

== Honours ==
- Legion of Honour
- Order of the Redeemer
