= Magia Naturalis =

Book by Giambattista della Porta

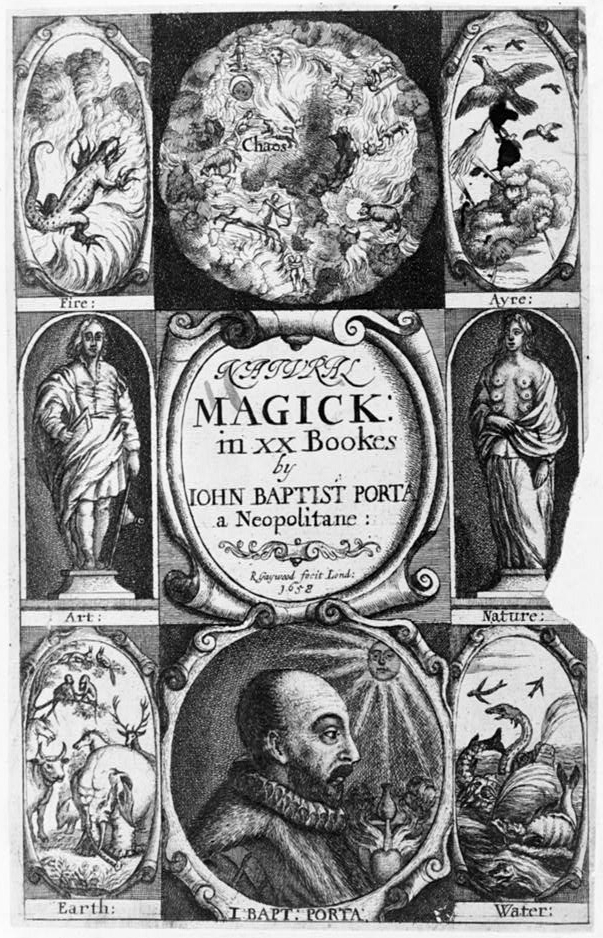
Frontispiece of an English translation of Natural Magick published in London in 1658.

Magia Naturalis is a 1558 work of natural magic written by Giambattista della Porta. The first edition consists of four books that draw upon classical sources and craft knowledge, encompassing topics that range from growing plants, transforming metals, and for creating illusions through natural, rather than sorcerous, means. It has been called "one of the great masterpieces of the Renaissance philosophical-scientific tradition".

== Background ==
Giambattista della Porta was born near Naples in 1535 to Leonardo Antonio and his wife, the sister of Adriano Gugliemo Spadafora, who shaped his early education with an extensive museum and library. His elder brother, Giovan Vincenzo, was also a scholar. He died on 14 February 1615.

=== Natural magic ===
Prior to 1600 there was no single or universal definition of magic within the Catholic Church, thus the boundaries of orthodoxy were subject to debate. The legitimacy of magical practice was based largely on whether it was held to be effected by natural or preternatural means, and whether it was intended to achieve harmful ends. Heinrich Cornelius Agrippa distinguishes the pure, white magic of ancient magicians like Hermes Trismegistus from the black magic of recent necromancers. Della Porta wrote that magic is "of two sorts", one that "proceeds through the revelation of demons" and one that "is natural, which everyone reverse", which is nothing but "the consummate knowledge of natural things, and a perfect philosophy"; his magic belonged to the second type. Della Porta believed a magician was a zealous servant of natural who learned how to reproduce natural processes. For della Porta, nature has a "double aspect": at the same time it makes itself visible, it conceals itself; it plays and deceives (ludere). Della Porta's theory of magic derives predominantly from Pico della Mirandola, Marsilio Ficino, and Agrippa, however della Porta does not talk about ceremonial magic or cabalistic mysticism.

== Contents ==
Porta describes several telegraphic instruments of varying design, including one based on mariner's compasses which seem to predict the magnetic telegraph, however Gerard J. Holzmann notes that "it is one thing to conceive of the potential of an idea, but quite another to turn it into a practical invention". He also discusses magnifying lenses, hydraulic organs, and various cryptographic schemes.

== Publication and circulation ==
The second edition of 1589 was expanded to twenty books. The first edition emphasizes the genre of 'books of secrets', which were popular during the Middle Ages and in the Renaissance, that generally focused on recipes, formulaes, and experiments; whereas the second addition "seems to address a different category of readers, more interested in the explanation of natural things and the construction of new sciences." The chapter De Distillationibus was published independently in Rome in 1608 and republished by Lazarus Zetzner in 1609.

=== Translations ===
The second edition was translated to English in 1658, with a second edition produced in 1669. This English translation has important differences; with titles changes and quotations from Ovid and Virgil mostly excised, in one case replacing 19 verses of Virgil with a single sentence. Dana Jalobeanu argues that the preface "consists in a 'domestication' of natural magic into something more akin to a Baconian natural and experimental history", eliminating the first proposition of the Latin version which describes itself as the perfect book of magic (magiae opus fere absolutum). The "changes, translations and updating make Della Porta's English reception [...] a fascination phenomenon of cultural appropriation through which the Neapolitan magus [...] becomes one more Baconian, like so many of his seventeenth century readers".

=== Censorship ===
A number of della Porta's writings, including the Magia naturalis, were subjected to inquistiorial scrutiny during the last quarter of the sixteenth century. In the early 1560s, della Porta established the Academia secretorum naturae, dedicated to the study of natural magic and occult qualities. The second addition is presented as the fruit of the Academia; della Porta emphasized that the twenty books "resulted directly from the cooperative endeavours within this academy". It was closed by the Neapolitan authorities in 1574, and della Porta was put on trial in October of 1577. The outcome of the trial was ambiguous, concluding in November of 1578 with the sentence of purgatio canonica, which assumed that it impossible to arrive at a verdict of absolution or condemnation. Jean Bodin, in his Démonomanie des sorciers of 1580, accused della Porta of naturalizing witchcraft for his description of witch's ointment as a hallucinatory concoction. Della Porta never disavowed magic despite harassment by the Inquisition.

== Influence and reception ==
Doina-Cristina Rusu writes that Francis Bacon used the Magia naturalis as an important source for the Sylva sylvarum, particularly della Porta's experimental reports; the second edition was "a standard presence in the libraries of Hooke, Wilkins, Barrow, and Newton". Thomas Browne, Samuel Hartlib, John Beal, and other English scientists made excerpts from the Magia in their notebooks, published works, or correspondences. For Donato Verardi, della Porta's "ideological and methodological innovation" allowed him to reframe the notion of magic as a cooperative and experimental endeavor, implicitly redefining 'nature' and 'natural' by subjecting those concepts to an experimental process. In the second edition, nature, like natural philosophy, "became historical, provisional, and in fieri", subject to "hunters of secrets" who make use of a techno-magical approach.

Johannes Kepler seems to have attributed the invention of the refracting telescope to della Porta in a "charming, generously appreciative letter Galileo", although this appears to be a misinterpretation of a passage in Magia Naturalis.

== Bibliography ==
- Tarrant, Neil (2013). "Giambattista Della Porta and the Roman Inquisition: censorship and the definition of Nature's limits in sixteenth-century Italy". The British Journal for the History of Science. 46 (4): 601–625. doi:10.1017/S0007087412000684. ISSN 0007-0874.
- Saito, Fumikazu (2014). "Knowing by doing in sixteenth-century natural magic: Giambattista della Porta and the wonders of nature". Circumscribere. 14: 17–39.
- Verardi, Donato (2025). "Giovan Battista Della Porta and the Invention of Experimental Magic: Collaborative Empiricism and the Dialectic of Disclosure and Secrecy". Knowledge and its Histories. Vol. 4. Florence: Firenze University Press. p. 9–24. doi:10.36253/979-12-215-0836-9.03. ISBN 979-12-215-0836-9.
- Jalobeanu, Dana (2025). "Making Della Porta a Baconian Philosopher: Magia naturalis in the Context of the English Experimental Philosophy". Knowledge and its Histories. Vol. 4. Florence: Firenze University Press. doi:10.36253/979-12-215-0836-9.09. ISBN 979-12-215-0836-9.
- Kodera, Sergius (2012-12-28). "Giambattista Della Porta's Histrionic Science". California Italian Studies. 3 (1). doi:10.5070/C331012022. ISSN 2155-7926.
- Zambelli, Paola (2007). White magic, Black magic in the European Renaissance. Leiden ; Boston: Brill. ISBN 978-90-04-16098-9.
