= Siegfried Zielinski =

German media theorist

Siegfried Zielinski (born 1951) is a German media theorist. He held the chair for Media Theory: Archaeology and Variantology of the Media at Berlin University of the Arts, he is Michel Foucault Professor for Techno-Culture and Media Archaeology at the European Graduate School in Saas Fee, and he is director of the International Vilém-Flusser-Archive at the Berlin University of the Arts. In 2016 until March 2018, he succeeded Peter Sloterdijk as head of the Karlsruhe University of Arts and Design.

== Biography ==
Siegfried Zielinski studied theatre, modern German literature, linguistics, semiotics, sociology, philosophy, and political theory in Marburg and Berlin, at the Free University and the Technical University. The major focus of his studies were on the field of advanced technical media, with Friedrich Knilli, whose institute had developed out of Walter Höllerer's Institute of Language in the Age of Technology.

In 1979 he wrote and directed the documentary film "Responses to HOLOCAUST in Western Germany" which is collected at Paley Center for Media in New York. He graduated in the same year with a thesis on Veit Harlan, which was also his first monograph published in 1981. His Ph.D. dissertation in 1985 on the History and Cultural Technique of the Video Recorder became the book "Zur Geschichte des Videorecorders". His habilitation, in 1989, was on high-definition television.

In 1989 he took up his first full professorship in audiovisual studies at the University of Salzburg in Austria, where he set up a department for teaching, research, and production of "Audiovisions". "Audiovisions" was also the title of his first book translated into English. In 1993, Zielinski was appointed professor of communication and audiovisual studies at the Academy of Media Arts Cologne; where, in 1994, he became its founding director. In mid-2001, he returned to teaching and research, concentrating on history and theory, developing his multi-dimensional (or non-linear) approach to diverse genealogies of media he would call an-archaeology or variantology of media.

From 2007 until 2015, Zielinski held the chair in media theory and archaeology/Variantology of media at Berlin University of the Arts. From 2016 until March 2018, he was rector at Karlsruhe University of Arts and Design. He also teaches techno-aesthetics and media archaeology at the European Graduate School (EGS) in Saas Fee, Switzerland, where he holds the Michel Foucault professorship.

== Publications (selection) ==
- Art in the 21st Century – Reflections and Provocations, ed. with Charles Merewether (Hong Kong: osage 2020). ISBN 978-988-77281-3-9.
- “Prospective Archaeology.” Technological Arts Preservation, edited by Selçuk Artut, Osman Serhat Karaman, and Cemal Yılmaz, Sabancı University Sakıp Sabancı Museum, 2021, pp. 28–67. ISBN 978-625-7329-16-3.
- Variations on Media Thinking (Minneapolis: University of Minnesota Press, 2019). ISBN 978-1-5179-0708-2.
- Dia-Logos - Ramon Llull's Method of Thought and Artistic Praxis. Ed. and written with Amador Vega and Peter Weibel (Minneapolis: University of Minnesota Press, 2019). ISBN 978-1517906092.
- Potential Spaces - Research and Education in Art and Design, ed. with Daniel Irrgang (Karlsruhe: ZKM books, 2019). ISBN 978-3-928201-58-2.
- Erkundungen im anthropologischen Viereck. Lektionen im Kontext des Flusserschen Denkens, ed. by Daniel Irrgang and Siegfried Zielinski (Paderborn: Wilhelm Fink, 2018). ISBN 978-3-7705-6338-8.
- Zur Genealogie des MedienDenkens - Siegfried Zielinski im Gespräch mit Peter Weibel, Boris Groys, Friedrich Knilli, Hand Belting, Valie Export, Sybille Krämer, Otto E. Rössler et al., ed. by Florian Hadler and Daniel Irrgang (Berlin: Kadmos, 2017). ISBN 978-3-86599-312-0.
- Allah's Automata: Artifacts of the Arab-Islamic Renaissance (800-1200), ed. by Siegfried Zielinski and Peter Weibel, exhibition catalogue, ZKM Center for Art and Media Karlsruhe (Berlin/Stuttgart: Hatje Cantz Verlag, 2015). ISBN 978-3775741064.
- Bodenlos – Vilém Flusser und die Künste, ed. by Siegfried Zielinski and Daniel Irrgang for the Academy of Arts, Berlin (Berlin: Akademie der Künste, 2015). ISBN 978-3883312149.
- Flusseriana: An Intellectual Toolbox, ed. by Siegfried Zielinski, Peter Weibel and Daniel Irrgang, tri-lingual English/German/Portuguese (Minneapolis: Univocal Publishing, 2015). ISBN 978-1937561529.
- Over the Head – Projecting Archaeology & Variantology of Arts & Media. Zur Archäologie & Variantologie der Künste und Medien, ed. by Marcel René Marburger. bilingual (Köln: edition 2014).
- AnArchive(s) - A Minimal Encyclopedia on Archaeology of the Arts and Media. Idea by Siegfried Zielinski, ed. by Claudia Giannetti, compiled by Eckhard Fürlus. bi-lingual German/English (Oldenburg/Cologne). ISBN 978-3-00-046018-0.
- 2011: Zielinski, Siegfried and Eckhard Fürlus (Editors) in cooperation with Daniel Irrgang. Variantology 5 – Neapolitan Affairs. On Deep Time Relations of Arts, Sciences and Technologies (Cologne: Verlag der Buchhandlung Walther Koenig). ISBN 978-3-86560-887-1.
- 2010: Zielinski, Siegfried and Eckhard Fürlus (Editors). Variantology 4 – On Deep Time Relations of Arts, Sciences and Technologies in the Arabic-Islamic World and Beyond (Cologne: Verlag der Buchhandlung Walther Koenig). ISBN 978-3-86560-732-4.
- 2009: Zielinski, Siegfried and Mono Krom (Photographer). Kaos Pilot Kairos Poet: Peter Weibel zum Fünfundsechzigsten (Cologne: Verlag der Buchhandlung König). ISBN 978-3-86560-647-1.
- 2009: Zielinski, Siegfried (Editor), Vilém Flusser (Author) and Silvia Wagnermaier (Editor). Kommunikologie weiter denken: Die Bochumer Vorlesungen (Frankfurt/Main: Fischer). ISBN 978-3-596-18145-2.
- 2009: Zielinski, Siegfried and Eckhard Fürlus. "Ah Lord, love me passionately": images of bodies and religion in the Lutz Teutloff collection: exposé for an imaginary exhibition / "Minne Mich Gewaltig!": BildKörper & Religion in der Sammlung Lutz Teutloff: Exposé für eine imaginäre Ausstellung (Teutloff Photo + Video Collection).
- 2008: Zielinski, Siegfried and Eckhard Fürus (Editors). Variantology 3 – On Deep Time Relations Of Arts, Sciences and Technologies in China and Elsewhere (Cologne: Verlag der Buchhandlung König). ISBN 978-3-86560-366-1.
- 2007: Zielinski, Siegfried and Andrés Burbano (Editor). Siegfried Zielinski: genealogias, vision, escucha y comunicación (Ediciones Uniandes). ISBN 978-958-695-238-5.
- 2007: Zielinski, Siegfried and David Link (Editors). Variantology 2 – On Deep Time Relations Of Arts, Sciences and Technologies (Cologne: Verlag der Buchhandlung König). ISBN 978-3-86560-050-9.
- 2007: Zielinski, Siegfried and Silvia M. Wagnermaier (Editors). Variantology – On Deep Time Relations Of Arts, Sciences and Technologies (Cologne: Verlag der Buchhandlung König). ISBN 978-3-88375-914-2.
- 2002: Zielinski, Siegfried. Archäologie der Medien: Zur Tiefenzeit des technischen Hörens und Sehens (Reinbek: Rowohlt Taschenbuch Verlag). ISBN 978-3-499-55649-4.

TRANSLATIONS OF Archäologie der Medien:

- 2010: Zielinski, Siegfried: "Archeologia mediów" ( Warszawa, sierpień: Wydawnictwo Oficyna Naukowa). ISBN 978-83-7459-108-9.

- 2006: Zielinski, Siegfried, Gloria Custance (Translator) and Timothy Druckrey (Foreword). Deep Time of the Media: Toward an Archaeology of Hearing and Seeing by Technical Means (The MIT Press). ISBN 978-0-262-24049-9.

- 2006: Zielinski, Siegfried, Rong Zhenhua and Xigefulide Qilinsiji (Translators). 媒体考古学 = Archäologie der Medien /Mei ti kao gu xue (Shang wu yin shu guan). ISBN 978-7-100-05058-6.

- 2006: Zielinski, Siegfried and Carlos D. Szlak (Translator). Arqueologia da mídia em busca do tempo remoto das técnicas do ver e do ouvir (Annablume). ISBN 978-85-7419-634-3.

- 2002: Zielinski, Siegfried (Co-Editor). Goodbye, dear pigeons (Cologne: Verlag der Buchhandlung König). ISBN 978-3-88375-602-8.
- 2000: Zielinski, Siegfried and Reiner Matzker. Medienwissenschaft: Teil 5: Fiktion als Fakt. "Metaphysik" der neuen Medien (Frankfurt/Main: Peter Lang). ISBN 978-3-906758-67-1.
- 1997: Zielinski, Siegfried, William Mitchell, Stephen Perrella, and Stacey Spiegel. V2 Interfacing Realities. Together with Knowbotic Research. Initiated by V2 (Andreas Broeckmann) (Uitgeverij De Balie). ISBN 978-90-6617-183-1.
- 1994: Zielinski, Siegfried and Angela Huemer (Editors). Keith Griffiths The Presence (Edition Blimp). ISBN 978-3-901272-01-1.
- 1992: Zielinski, Siegfried. Video – Apparat, Medium, Kunst, Kultur: Ein internationaler Reader (Frankfurt/Main: Peter Lang). ISBN 978-3-631-42688-3.
- 1989: Zielinski, Siegfried. Audiovisionen: Kino und Fernsehen als Zwischenspiele (Reinbek: Rowohlts Enzyklopädie). ISBN 978-3-499-55489-6.

TRANSLATIONS OF Audiovisionen:

- 1999: Zielinski, Siegfried and Gloria Custance (Translator). Audiovisions: Cinema and Television as Entr'actes in History (Amsterdam University Press) ISBN 978-90-5356-303-8.

- 2009: Zielinski, Siegfried. Audiovíziók - A mozi és a televízió mint a törrténelem közjátékai, translated into Hungarian by Schulz Katalin & Kurucz Andrea (Budapest: C^{3} Alapítvány – Condola).

- 1989: Zielinski, Siegfried and Friedrich Knilli (Editors). Germanistische Medienwissenschaft. Teil 1: Die Rolle der Medien in der Auslandsgermanistik (Frankfurt/Main: Peter Lang). ISBN 978-3-261-03955-2.
- 1989: Zielinski, Siegfried. Germanistische Medienwissenschaft. Teil 2: Fernsehspielforschung in der Bundesrepublik und der DDR 1950-1985 (Frankfurt/Main: Peter Lang) ISBN 978-3-261-03956-9.
- 1989: Zielinski, Siegfried and Friedrich Knilli (Editors). Germanistische Medienwissenschaft. Teil 3: Comicforschung in der Bundesrepublik Deutschland, 1945-1984 (Frankfurt/Main: Peter Lang). ISBN 978-3-261-03955-2.
- 1986: Zielinski, Siegfried. Zur Geschichte des Videorecorders (Berlin: Wissenschaftsverlag Volker Spiess). ISBN 978-3-89166-038-6.
- 1983: Zielinski, Siegfried, Erwin Gundelsheimer, Frank Ostermann, Heino Mass, Friedrich Knilli. Betrifft: Holocaust. Zuschauer schreiben an den WDR (Berlin: Wissenschaftsverlag Volker Spiess). ISBN 978-3-89166-273-1.
- 1982: Zielinski, Siegfried and Friedrich Knilli. Holocaust zur Unterhaltung. Anatomie eines internationalen Bestsellers (Berlin: Espresso). ISBN 978-3-88290-012-5.
- 1983: Zielinski, Siegfried. Televisionen - Medienzeiten. Beiträge zur Diskussion um die Zukunft der Kommunikation (Berlin: Express Edition). ISBN 978-3-88548-300-7.
- 1983: Zielinski, Siegfried, Friedrich Knilli, Thomas Maurer and Thomas Radevagen. Jud Süss. Filmprotokoll, Programmheft und Einzelanalysen (Berlin: Wissenschaftsverlag Volker Spiess). ISBN 978-3-89166-266-3.
- 1981: Zielinski, Siegfried. Veit Harlan: Analysen und Materialien zur Auseinandersetzung mit einem Film-Regisseur des deutschen Faschismus (Frankfurt/Main: Fischer). ISBN 978-3-88323-280-5.

Publications on Zielinski

- Thresholds Journal, issue 2: Traces (2018).
- Zur Genealogie des MedienDenkens, ed by Daniel Irrgang and Florian Hadler (Berlin: Kulturverlag Kadmos, 2017), ISBN 978-3-86599-312-0.
- Objects of Knowledge, of Art and of Friendship, A Small Technical Encyclopaedia, for Siegfried Zielinski; ed. by David Link and Nils Röller (Leipzig: Institut für Buchkunst, 2011), ISBN 978-3-932865-64-0.

== Public Lectures ==
- Siegfried Zielinski. “Artificial Extelligence: Transformation and Projection…” 22.08.2019
- Siegfried Zielinski. A Trilogy of Time. A Keynote at transmediale 2010.
- Siegfried Zielinski. On An-Archaeology. Interview 2007.
- Siegfried Zielinski. Interview for Imagenes del Rojas, UBA TV. Buenos Aires 1999.
- Siegfried Zielinski. Is New Media really new? Interview for The Lounge in 1999.

== Memberships ==
Siegfried Zielinski is elected member of, amongst others, the European Film Academy (EFA), the Academy of Arts, Berlin , the Akademie der Wissenschaften und der Künste Nordrhein-Westfalen and the Magic Lantern Society of Great Britain .
