= Academia Secretorum Naturae =

Defunct Scientific society in Naples

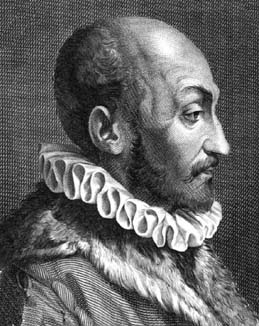
Giambattista della Porta, founder of the Academia Secretorum Naturae

The first scientific society, the Academia Secretorum Naturae was founded in Naples in 1560 by Giambattista della Porta, a noted polymath. In Italian it was called Accademia dei Segreti, the Academy of the Mysteries of Nature, and the members referred to themselves as the otiosi (men of leisure). The society met at the home of della Porta in the Due Porte section of Naples so-named in reference to two entrances to caverns that apparently served as a meeting place. (The site has recently been the object of urban archaeology.) "Candidates for membership had to present a new fact in natural science as a condition of membership," but otherwise membership was open. Its activities came under the subject of an ecclesiastical investigation and della Porta was ordered by Pope Gregory XIII to close his Academy in 1578 under suspicion of sorcery.

== Sources ==
- Arianna Borrelli: Giovan Battista Della Porta’s Neapolitan Magic & His Humanistic Meteorology, in: Variantology 5. Neapolitain Affairs. (Cologne: Verlag der Buchhandlung Walther König, 2011), ISBN 978-3-86560-887-1.
- Siegfried Zielinski: Deep Time of the Media. Toward an Archaeology of Hearing and Seeing by Technical Means (Cambridge, MA: MIT Press, 2008), ISBN 978-0-262-74032-6.
