= Giambattista della Porta =

Italian polymath (1535–1615)

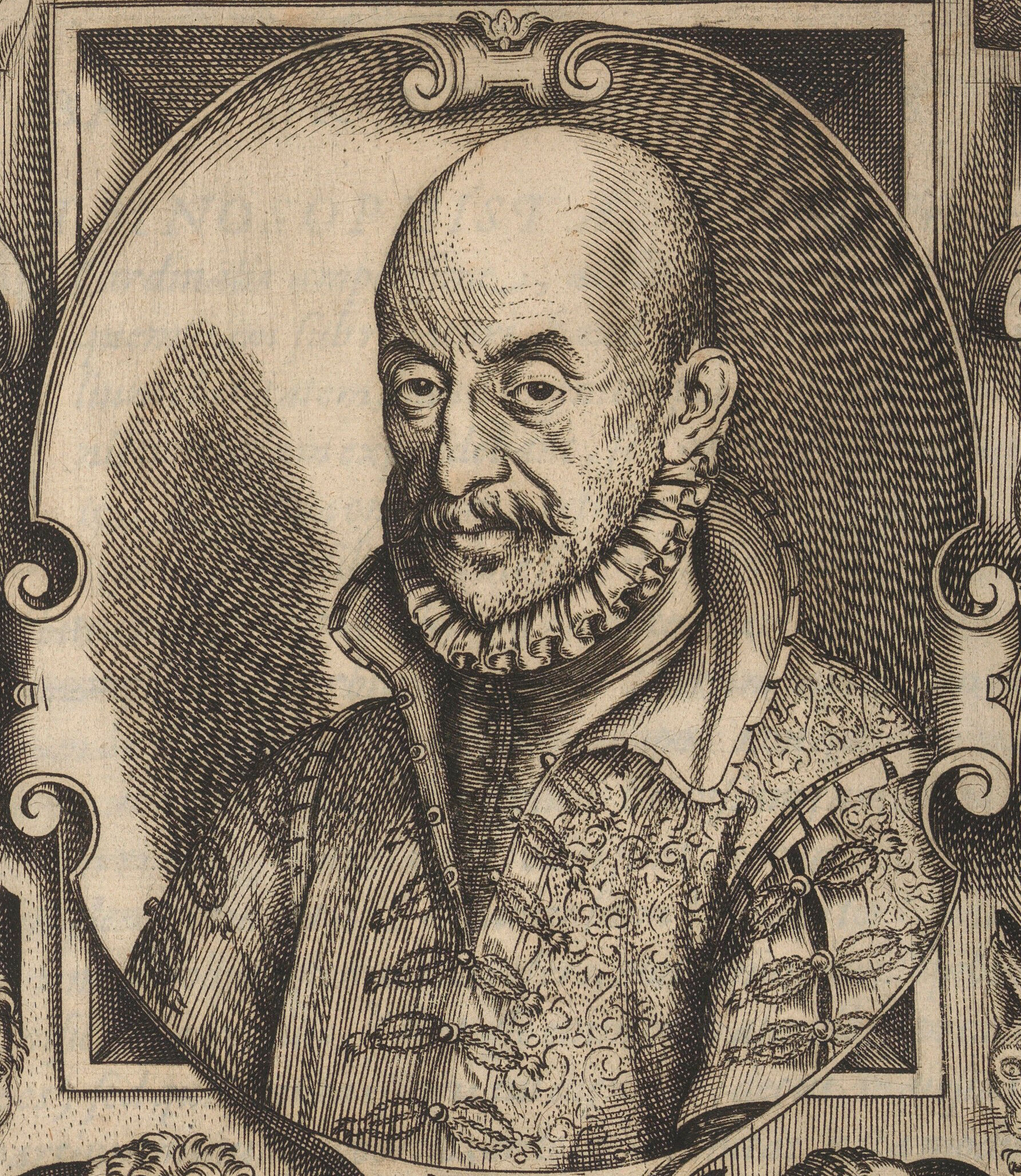
- Della Porta in 1586
- Born: late 1535; Vico Equense, Kingdom of Naples
- Died: 4 February 1615 (aged 79); Naples, Kingdom of Naples
- Known for: Magia Naturalis, De Furtivis Literarum Notis
- Scientific career
- Fields: Occultism, astrology, alchemy, mathematics, meteorology, natural philosophy

Giambattista della Porta (Italian: [dʒambatˈtista della ˈpɔrta]; 1535 – 4 February 1615), also known as Giovanni Battista Della Porta, was an Italian scholar, polymath and playwright who lived in Naples at the time of the Renaissance, Scientific Revolution and Counter-Reformation.

Giambattista della Porta spent the majority of his life on scientific endeavours. He benefited from an informal education of tutors and visits from renowned scholars. His most famous work, first published in 1558, is entitled Magia Naturalis (Natural Magic). In this book he covered a variety of the subjects he had investigated, including occult philosophy, astrology, alchemy, mathematics, meteorology, and natural philosophy. He was also referred to as "professor of secrets".

== Childhood ==
Giambattista della Porta was born at Vico Equense, near Naples, to the nobleman Nardo Antonio della Porta. He was the third of four sons and the second to survive childhood, having an older brother Gian Vincenzo and a younger brother Gian Ferrante. Della Porta had a privileged childhood including his education. His father had a thirst for learning, a trait he would pass on to all of his children. He surrounded himself with distinguished people and entertained the likes of philosophers, mathematicians, poets, and musicians. The atmosphere of the house resembled an academy for his sons. The members of the learned circle of friends stimulated the boys, tutoring and mentoring them, under the strict guidance of their father.

In addition to having talents for the sciences and mathematics, all the brothers were also extremely interested in the arts, music in particular. Despite their interest, none of them possessed any sort of talent for it, but they did not allow that to stifle their progress in learning theory. They were all accepted into the Scuola di Pitagora, a highly exclusive academy of musicians.

More aware of their social position than the idea that his sons could have professions in science, Nardo Antonio raised the boys more as gentlemen than as scholars. Therefore, the boys struggled to learn to sing, as that was considered a courtly accomplishment of gentlemen. They were taught to dance, ride, perform well in tournaments and games, and dress well. The training gave della Porta, at least earlier in his life, a taste for the finer aspects of privileged living.

"From approximately 1563 to 1566 Della Porta travels to other parts of Italy, France and Spain, collecting secrets and meeting with learned men. Indeed he presented to Philip II his book on ciphers De Furtivis Literarum Notis (1563). The second edition of his Magia Naturalis (1561) also contains a brief dedication to the Spanish Philip"

== Scientific disciplines ==
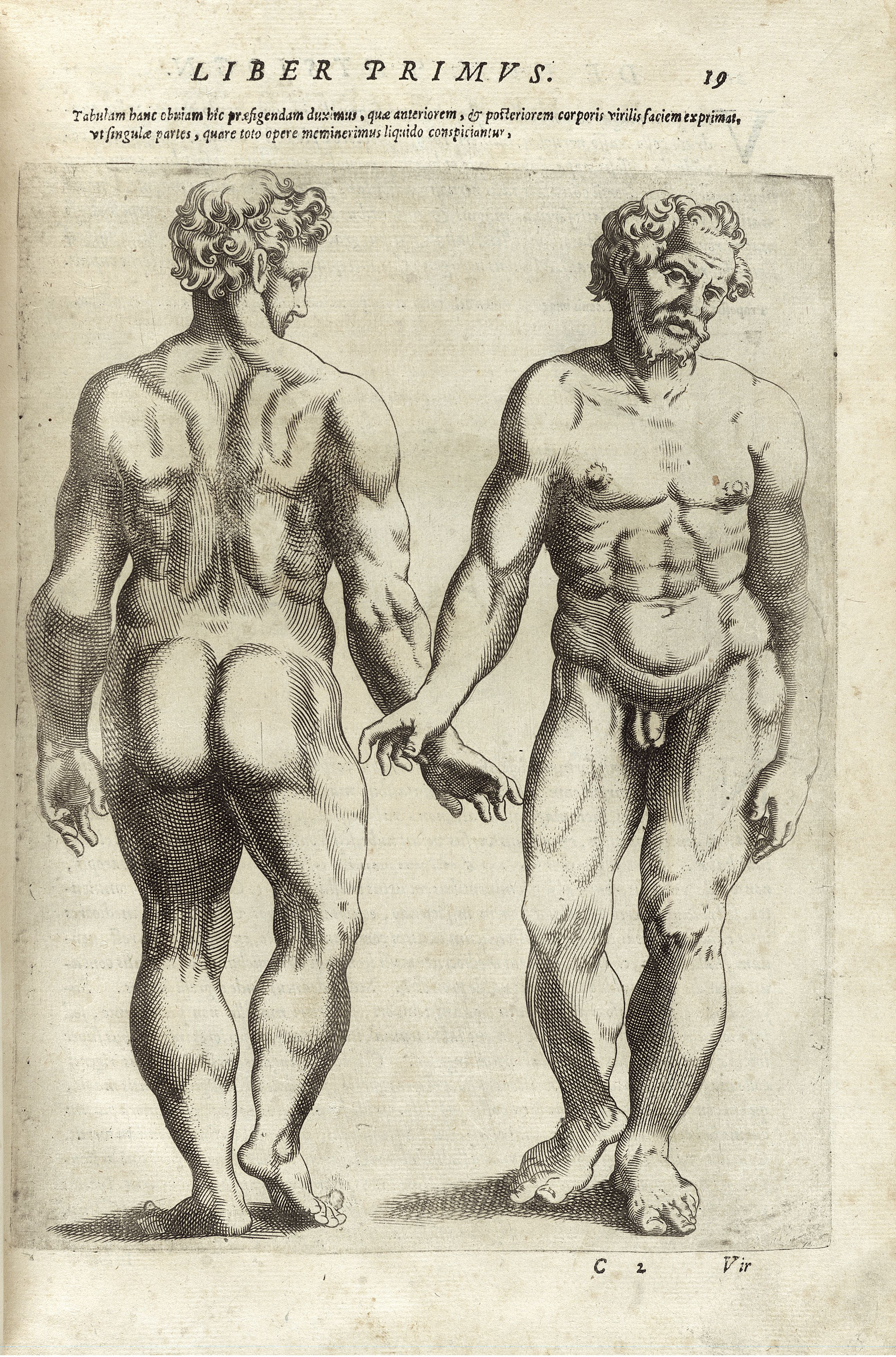
From De humana physiognomonia, 1586

In 1563, della Porta published De Furtivis Literarum Notis, a work about cryptography. In it, he described the first known digraphic substitution cipher. Charles J. Mendelsohn commented:

He was, in my opinion, the outstanding cryptographer of the Renaissance. Some unknown who worked in a hidden room behind closed doors may possibly have surpassed him in general grasp of the subject, but among those whose work can be studied he towers like a giant.

Della Porta invented a method which allowed him to write secret messages on the inside of eggs. Some of his friends were imprisoned by the Inquisition. At the gate of the prison, everything was checked except for eggs. Della Porta wrote messages on the eggshell using a mixture made of plant pigments and alum. The ink penetrated the eggshell which is semi-porous. When the eggshell was dry, he boiled the egg in hot water and the ink on the outside of the egg was washed away. When the recipient in prison peeled off the shell, the message was revealed once again on the egg white. De Furtivis Literarum Notis also contains one of the earliest known examples of music substitution ciphers.

In 1586 della Porta published a work on physiognomy, De humana physiognomonia libri IIII (1586). This influenced the Swiss eighteenth-century pastor Johann Kaspar Lavater as well as the 19th-century criminologist Cesare Lombroso. Della Porta wrote extensively on a wide spectrum of subjects throughout his life – for instance, an agricultural encyclopedia entitled "Villa" as well as works on meteorology, optics, and astronomy.

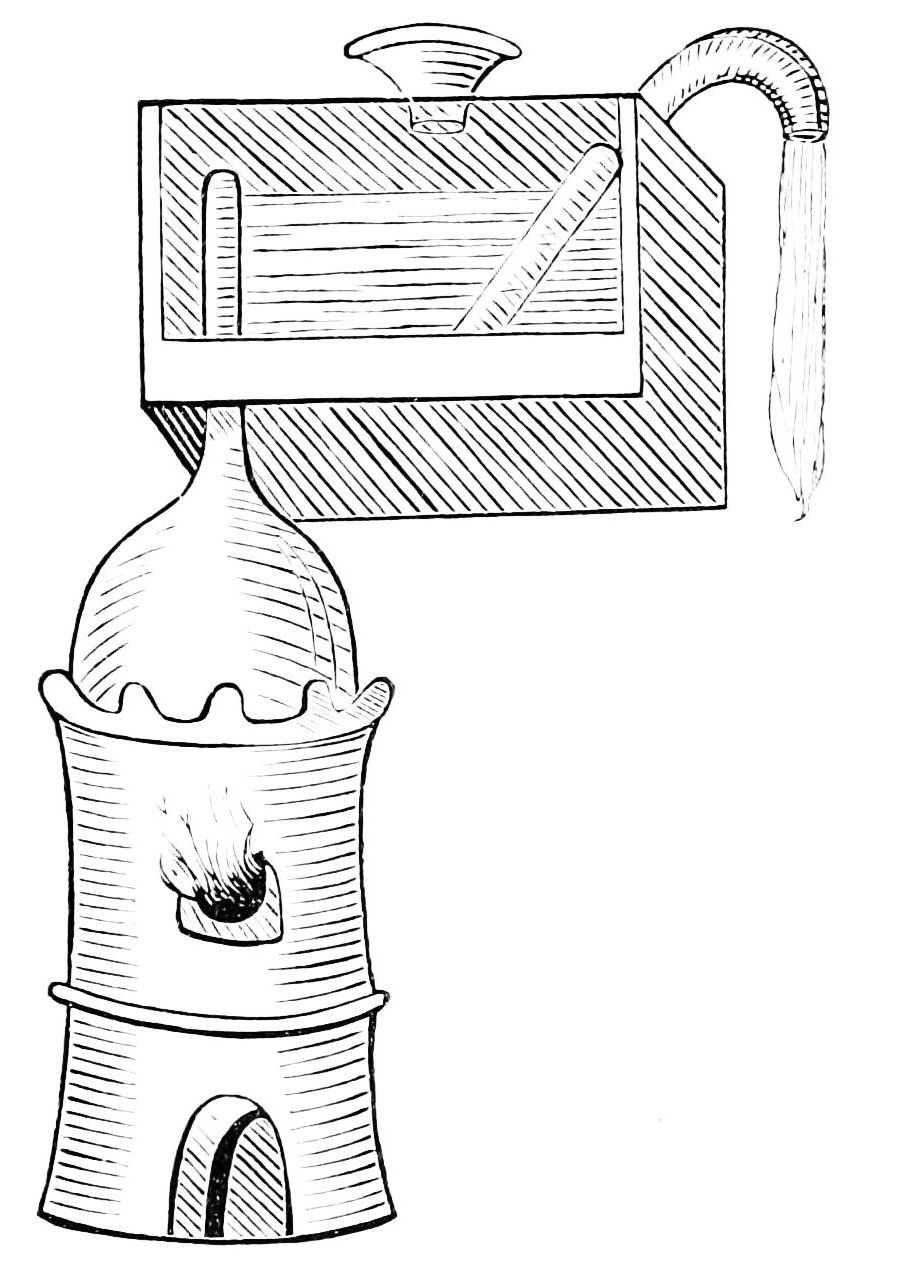
Steam pressure apparatus, 1601

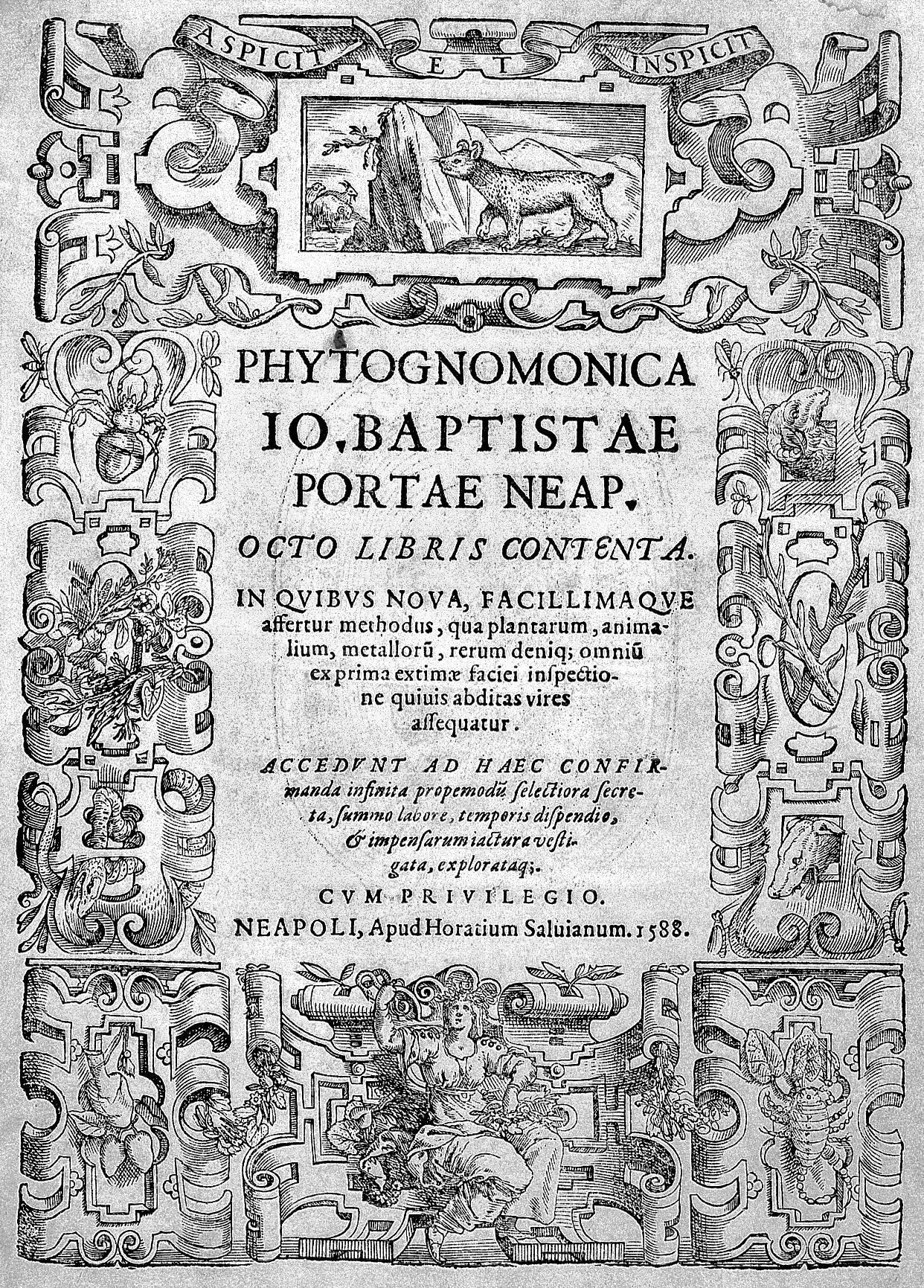
Phytognomonica, 1588

In 1589, on the eve of the early modern Scientific Revolution, della Porta became the first person to attack in print, on experimental grounds, the ancient assertion that garlic could disempower magnets. This was an early example of the authority of early authors being replaced by experiment as the backing for a scientific assertion. Della Porta's conclusion was confirmed experimentally by Thomas Browne, among others.

In later life, della Porta collected rare specimens and grew exotic plants. His work Phytognomonica lists plants according to their geographical location. In Phytognomonica the first observation of fungal spores is recorded, making him a pioneer of mycology.

His private museum was visited by travellers and was one of the earliest examples of natural history museums. It inspired the Jesuit Athanasius Kircher to begin a similar, even more renowned, collection in Rome.

== Pioneering scientific society ==
Della Porta was the founder of a scientific society called the Academia Secretorum Naturae (Accademia dei Segreti). This group was more commonly known as the Otiosi, (Men of Leisure). Founded sometime before 1580, the Otiosi were one of the first scientific societies in Europe and their aim was to study the "secrets of nature." Any person applying for membership had to demonstrate they had made a new discovery in the natural sciences.

The Academia Secretorum Naturae was compelled to disband when its members were suspected of dealing with the occult. Della Porta was summoned to Rome by Pope Gregory XIII. Though he personally emerged from the meeting unscathed, the Academia Secretorum Naturae disbanded. Despite this incident, della Porta remained religiously devout and became a lay Jesuit brother.

Della Porta joined The Academy of the Lynxes in 1610.

== Technological contributions ==
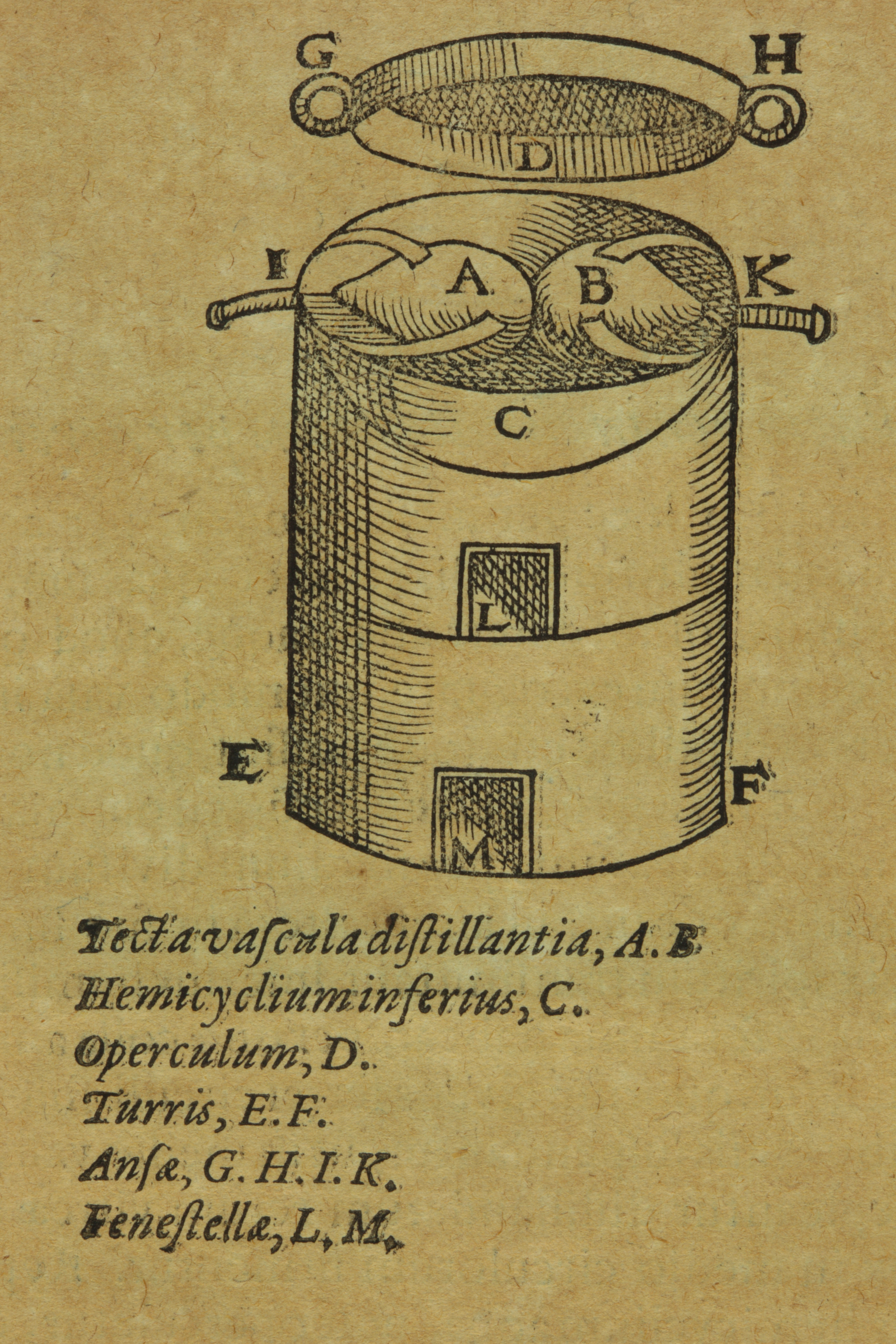
Chemical apparatus for a still from De distillatione, 1608

His interest in a variety of disciplines resulted in the technological advances of the following: agriculture, hydraulics, Military Engineering, instruments, and pharmacology. He published a book in 1606 on raising water by the force of the air. In 1608 he published a book on military engineering, and another on distillation.

Additionally, della Porta perfected the camera obscura. In a later edition of his Natural Magic, della Porta described this device as having a convex lens. Though he was not the inventor, the popularity of this work helped spread knowledge of it. He compared the shape of the human eye to the lens in his camera obscura, and provided an easily understandable example of how light could bring images into the eye.

Della Porta also claimed to have invented the first telescope, but died while preparing the treatise (De telescopiis) in support of his claim. His efforts were also overshadowed by Galileo Galilei's improvement of the telescope in 1609, following its introduction by Lippershey in the Netherlands in 1608.

In the book, della Porta also mentioned an imaginary device known as a sympathetic telegraph. The device consisted of two circular boxes, similar to compasses, each with a magnetic needle, supposed to be magnetized by the same lodestone. Each box was to be labelled with the 26 letters, instead of the usual directions. Della Porta assumed that this would coordinate the needles such that when a letter was dialled in one box, the needle in the other box would swing to point to the same letter, thereby helping in communicating.

== Religious complications ==
A Catholic, della Porta was examined by the Inquisition in the years prior to 1578. He was forced to disband his Academia Secretorum Naturae, and in 1592 his philosophical works were prohibited from further publication by the Church; the ban was lifted in 1598. Porta's involvement with the Inquisition puzzles historians due to his active participation in charitable Jesuit works by 1585. A possible explanation for this lies in Porta's personal relations with Fra Paolo Sarpi after 1579.

== Playwright ==
The 17 theatrical works that have survived from a total of perhaps 21 or 23 works comprise 14 comedies, one tragicomedy, one tragedy and one liturgical drama.

Comedies

- Lo Astrologo;
- La Carbonaria;
- La Chiappinaria;
- La Cintia;
- Gli Duoi fratelli rivali;
- La Fantesca;
- La Furiosa;
- Il Moro;
- L'Olimpia;
- I Simili;
- La Sorella;
- La Tabernaria;
- La Trappolaria;
- La Turca

Others

- La Penelope (tragicomedy);
- L'Ulisse (tragedy);
- Il Giorgio (liturgical drama)

Although they belong to the lesser-known tradition of the commedia erudita rather than the commedia dell'arte - which means they were written out as entire scripts instead of being improvised from a scenario - della Porta's comedies are eminently performable. While there are obvious similarities between some of the characters in della Porta's comedies and the masks of the commedia dell'arte, it should be borne in mind that the characters of the commedia erudita are uniquely created by the text in which they appear, unlike the masks, which remain constant from one scenario to another. Indeed, the masks of the improvised theatre evolved as stylised versions of recurring character types in written comedies. One of Della Porta's most notable stock characters was the parasito or parassita, a gluttonous trickster whose lack of moral scruples enabled him to pull off stunts that initially might risk bringing the plot crashing down, but ended up winning the day in unexpected ways. The term parasito was translated by John Florio in his Italian to English Dictionary first published in 1598 as a smell-feast, a flatterer, a parasite, a trencherd or bellie friend, one that saieth and doeth all things to please the humor of another, and agreeth unto him in all things to have his repast scotfree. Perhaps the best example of this type is Morfeo in the comedy La Fantesca.

== Works ==
Le commedie (1910 edition), full pdf

- Natural Magic (1558) expanded to 20 books in 1589. English translation 1658. Available online at
- De furtivis Literarum Notis (1563) On secret codes cryptography]]
- L'arte del ricordare (1566) Italian treatise on the Art of Memory (remembering)
- Villa (1583–92) Agricultural encyclopedia
- De refractione optices (1589) On Optics
- Elementorum curvilineorum libri duo (1601)
- Ars reminiscendi (1602) On the Art of Memory. Longer version in Latin of the 1566 treatise.
- Coelestis Physiogranonia (1603) pub. Naples
- De occultis literarum notis (1606). Available online at
- De aeris transmutanionbus (1609) On meteorology
- De Miracoli & Maravigliosi Effetti dalla Natura prodotti (1665) pub. Venice
- Giovanni Battista Della Porta (1586). De humana physiognomonia libri IV. Vico Equense: Giuseppe Cacchi.
- Giovanni Battista Della Porta (1602). De humana physiognomonia libri VI. Neapoli: Tarquinio Longo.
- Giovanni Battista Della Porta, Phytognomonica, Napoli, Orazio Salviani, 1588.
- Giovanni Battista Della Porta (1601). Pneumaticorum libri tres. Napoli: Giovanni Giacomo Carlino.
- Giovanni Battista Della Porta (1608). De distillatione. Roma: Stamperia Camerale.
- Giovanni Battista Della Porta (1677). Della chirofisonomia. Napoli: Antonio Bulifon.
- Giovanni Battista Della Porta (1910). Le commedie. Vol. 1 (Scrittori d'Italia ed.). Bari: Vincenzo Spampanato; Laterza.
- Giovanni Battista Della Porta (1911). Le commedie. Vol. 2 (Scrittori d'Italia ed.). Bari: Vincenzo Spampanato; Laterza.

== Sources ==
- Clubb, Louise George (1965) Giambattista Della Porta, Dramatist. Princeton: Princeton University Press.
- Armando Maggi Giovan Battista Della Porta's The Art of Remembering. Ravenna: Longo Editore, 2012. ISBN 978-88-8063-747-9.
- Arianna Borrelli: Giovan Battista Della Porta's Neapolitan Magic & His Humanistic Meteorology, in: Variantology 5. Neapolitain Affairs. (Cologne: Verlag der Buchhandlung Walther König, 2011), ISBN 978-3-86560-887-1.
- Siegfried Zielinski: Deep Time of the Media. Toward an Archaeology of Hearing and Seeing by Technical Means (Cambridge, Massachusetts: MIT Press, 2008), ISBN 978-0-262-74032-6.
- Philippe Malgouyres: La Science de l’émerveillement. Artistes et intellectuels à la cour de Rodolphe II (1552-1612) (Paris, Mare & Martin, 2025) ISBN 978-2-36222-125-5, p. 215-227
