= Magical alphabet =

Set of letter symbols used in magic

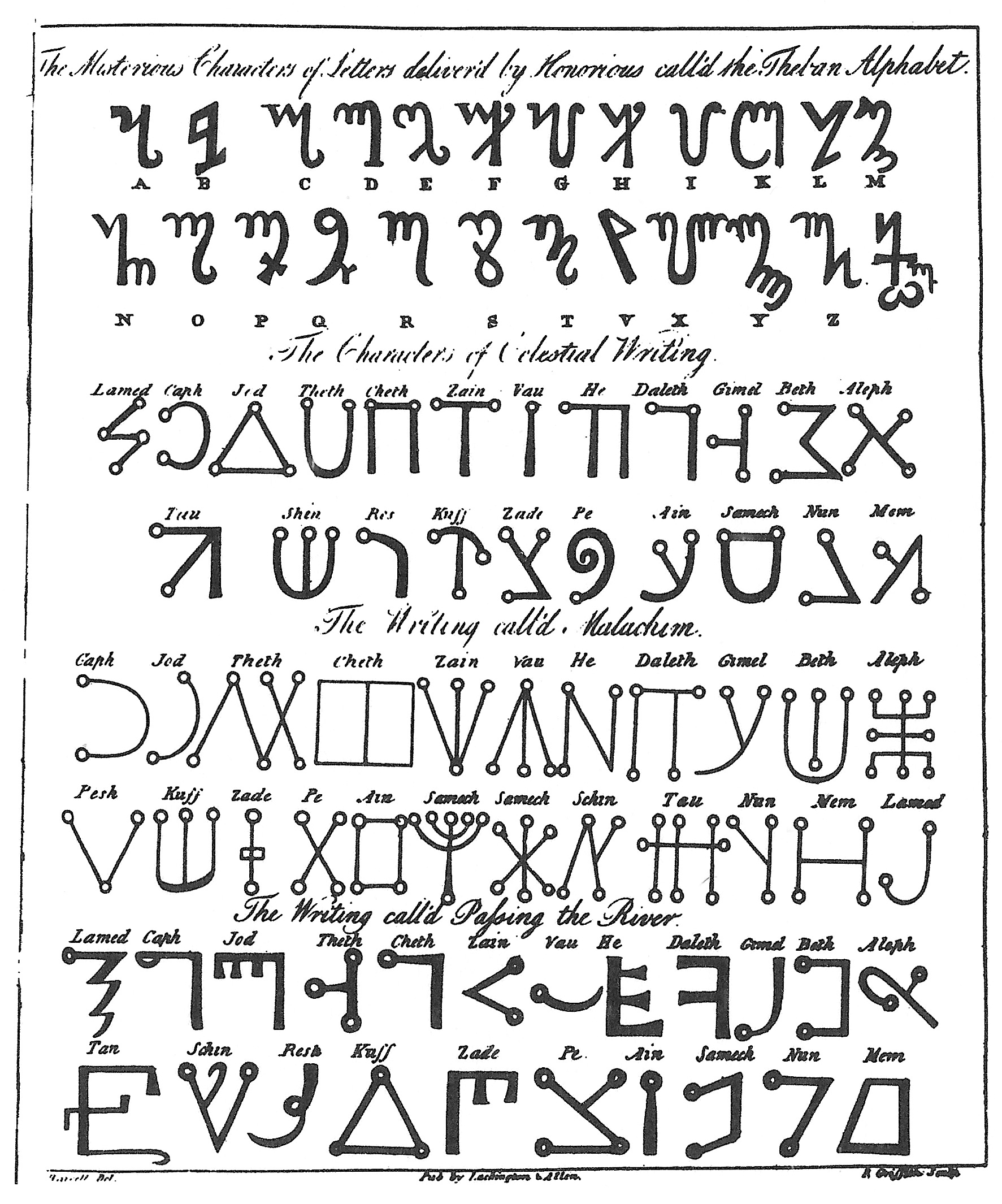
Various magical alphabets as presented in The Magus (1801).

A magical alphabet, or magickal alphabet, is a set of letters used primarily in occult magical practices and other esoteric traditions. These alphabets serve various purposes, including conducting rituals, creating amulets or talismans, casting spells, and invoking spiritual entities. Several magical alphabets, including the Celestial Alphabet, Malachim, and Transitus Fluvii, are based on the Hebrew alphabet, which itself has a long history of use in mystical and magical contexts.

As ordered letter-sets, magical alphabets are distinct from the various non-alphabetic, non-sequential "magical/magickal scripts" which contain symbols representing entities, festivals, ritual objects or practices, alchemical/astrological/astronomical objects or events, (Note: E.g. 🜁 Air 🜂 Fire 🜄 Water 🜃 Earth, the four classical elements.) or other ideas, (Note: E.g. Pentagram, or Pentacle, representing the human essence and role in the universe; the lower four points are said to stand for the four classical material elements, while the fifth point on top is said to stand for either Aether or Spirit. E.g., Tyson 2001, p. 147: "In the system of the Golden Dawn, the top point of the pentagram is assigned to Spirit, the upper-left point to Air, the upper-right point to Water, the lower-left point to Earth, and the lower-right point to Fire. These elemental forces are summoned and banished by projecting the pentagram in various ways.") rather than sounds. Some alphabets, like runes, may serve both purposes, thus acting as both alphabets and logographic/ideographic scripts according to their use at the time.

== Historical development ==
=== Ancient civilizations ===
Magical alphabets have deep roots in ancient civilizations. In ancient Egypt, hieroglyphs were not only a means of communication but also an integral part of magical practices. These symbols were believed to possess protective and transformative powers, particularly when used in rituals, amulets, and tomb inscriptions. Similarly, in Mesopotamia, the cuneiform script was employed in incantations and rituals designed to invoke divine powers, demonstrating an early link between written language and magical practices.

The ancient Greeks also contributed to the development of magical scripts. The Greek alphabet was used in the Greek magical papyri, where letters and symbols were combined in spells intended to protect or curse individuals. Additionally, the Phoenician alphabet, which influenced many later scripts, was used in the creation of amulets meant to ward off evil.

=== Medieval period ===
The medieval period saw the rise of Kabbalah, a mystical tradition within Judaism that ascribed profound spiritual and magical significance to the Hebrew alphabet. Kabbalists believed that the Hebrew letters were not merely symbols for sounds but were imbued with divine energy. Each letter was associated with specific cosmic forces, and the alphabet as a whole was used to unlock the mysteries of the universe through practices such as gematria, which interprets the numerical values of letters and words to reveal hidden meanings.

Key texts like the Sefer Yetzirah and the Zohar played a crucial role in shaping the mystical uses of the Hebrew alphabet. These texts describe how the letters were used in the creation of the universe and continue to serve as a means of interacting with divine forces. The Hebrew alphabet's significance in Kabbalistic practices made it a central tool in the development of Jewish magic during the medieval period.

=== Renaissance ===
The Renaissance was a period of synthesis, during which various magical alphabets were studied, cataloged, and integrated into new esoteric systems. As Kabbalah became known in the West, particularly during the Renaissance, the Hebrew alphabet was adopted by Western occultists who were deeply influenced by Jewish mystical traditions. Figures like Heinrich Cornelius Agrippa integrated the Hebrew alphabet into their esoteric systems, where it was used alongside other magical alphabets like the Celestial Alphabet and runes. In these systems, the Hebrew letters were often linked to the Qabalistic Tree of Life, each letter corresponding to specific sefirot (divine emanations) and paths, thereby becoming a key component in Western magical practices.

=== Modern times ===
The Hebrew alphabet, along with other scripts like the Celestial Alphabet and runes, became central to the practices of the Hermetic Order of the Golden Dawn and Aleister Crowley’s Thelema. These systems often combined magical alphabets with astrological symbols, tarot, and numerology, creating powerful tools for ceremonial magic and divination.

Today, magical alphabets, including the Hebrew alphabet, continue to play an important role in contemporary esoteric practices. They remain vital elements in the creation of talismans, the performance of rituals, and the exploration of mystical experiences, demonstrating their enduring significance across cultures and historical periods.

== Major magical alphabets ==
=== Runes ===
Runes are perhaps the most well-known of the ancient magical alphabets, originating with the Germanic peoples around the 2nd century CE. The earliest and most prominent runic script is the Elder Futhark, which consists of 24 characters. Each rune is both a letter and a symbol with specific meanings, and the script was used for various purposes, including inscriptions, divination, and magic.

Runes were carved into amulets, weapons, and stones, where they were believed to convey protection, power, or other magical properties. The use of runes persisted even after the adoption of the Latin alphabet, particularly in the Scandinavian countries, where they continued to be used in magical practices well into the medieval period. Modern runic magic often draws on these ancient traditions, using runes for divination, protection spells, and other esoteric purposes.

=== Theban alphabet ===
The Theban alphabet, often referred to as the "witches' alphabet", is a significant magical script that gained prominence during the medieval period. Its origins are somewhat obscure, but it is most commonly associated with the Sworn Book of Honorius, a medieval grimoire. The Theban Alphabet was popularized by Johannes Trithemius in his Polygraphia (1518), where it was presented as a cipher for writing secret messages and magical texts.

The script consists of 24 characters, each corresponding to a letter in the Latin alphabet. Despite its relatively simple design, the Theban Alphabet has been widely used in European witchcraft and later in Wiccan practices, particularly for writing in Books of Shadows, inscribing spells, and creating talismans. Its continued use in modern esoteric practices demonstrates its enduring appeal as a tool for encoding and concealing magical knowledge.

=== Celestial Alphabet ===
The Celestial Alphabet, also known as the Angelic Script, was introduced by Heinrich Cornelius Agrippa in the early 16th century, particularly in his seminal work Three Books of Occult Philosophy (1533). Agrippa wrote that this alphabet was used to communicate with angelic beings and to perform rituals aimed at invoking divine forces. The Celestial Alphabet consists of abstract symbols that are believed to represent the celestial bodies and divine emanations. It is often used in the creation of talismans, sigils, and other magical tools designed to harness spiritual energy.

Agrippa’s influence extended beyond his own time, as the Celestial Alphabet became an integral part of Western esotericism. The script was incorporated into various magical systems, including those practiced by the Hermetic Order of the Golden Dawn, where it was used alongside other mystical alphabets for rituals and divination.

=== Enochian alphabet ===
The Enochian alphabet is one of the most complex and enigmatic magical scripts, developed by the Elizabethan magus John Dee and his scryer Edward Kelley in the late 16th century. According to Dee and Kelley, the alphabet was revealed to them by angels during a series of spiritual communications, and it was intended to be used in the Enochian system of magic, a powerful and elaborate form of magic. The Enochian Alphabet consists of 21 characters, each associated with specific angelic beings and celestial powers.

The Enochian system, including its alphabet, has had a significant impact on Western occultism, particularly in the rituals of the Hermetic Order of the Golden Dawn and later in the magical practices of Aleister Crowley. The Enochian Alphabet is used in invocations, scrying sessions, and the creation of magical tablets, where it is believed to facilitate communication with angelic realms and access to hidden knowledge.

=== Other magical alphabets ===
Beyond the more widely known scripts, several other magical alphabets have played roles in esoteric traditions. These include:

- Alphabet of Daggers: presented in occultist Aleister Crowley's The Vision and the Voice.
- Alphabet of Desire, or Atavistic Alphabet: created by occultist Austin Osman Spare, influential to chaos magic.
- Alphabet of the Magi: used by some members and emulators of the Order of the Golden Dawn; strictly speaking, an abjad.
- Malachim: Introduced by Agrippa in his Three Books of Occult Philosophy. Malachim, meaning "angels", is a script composed of straight lines and curves. It was primarily used for inscribing talismans and other magical objects.
- Ogham: An early medieval alphabet used primarily by the Celts, Ogham consists of 20 characters, each associated with a specific tree and its corresponding magical properties. Ogham was used for divination, as well as in the creation of inscriptions and talismans.
- Transitus Fluvii, or "Crossing the River": Another less-known magical alphabet, mentioned by Agrippa, consists of more intricate symbols. It was also used in various talismanic and mystical practices.

=== Natural languages ===
A natural language's alphabet can also be used for spellwork, (Note: Including both the original Latin alphabet (see Sator square, Abracadabra amulet) and the modern Latin alphabet, as with the spells and talismans in the folk magic book: Hohman, John George (1820). Der lange verborgene Freund [The Long Lost Friend]. (published first in German, then in English). Reading, Pennsylvania. (Entire text online; Internet Archive copy of 1850 edition; printed replicas in each language are still sold.) Viz. the amulet at p. 17, resembling the Abracadabra triangle.) so the above list cannot be exclusive.

== Applications in magic ==
Magical alphabets have been employed across various cultures and eras, primarily for their perceived ability to tap into and manipulate spiritual or supernatural forces. Their applications in magic are diverse, ranging from talismanic magic to ritual invocations, each leveraging the symbolic power embedded in these scripts.

=== Talismanic magic ===
One of the most common uses of magical alphabets is in the creation of talismans and amulets. These objects are believed to carry protective, healing, or empowering properties, derived from the symbols inscribed on them. The practice of inscribing talismans with magical scripts dates back to ancient civilizations, where the combination of sacred symbols and invocations was thought to summon the favor of gods or spirits.

In Jewish Kabbalistic tradition, Hebrew letters are often used on amulets to invoke divine protection or blessings. Each letter is seen as a channel of divine energy, and when arranged in specific combinations, they are believed to produce powerful effects. Similarly, in medieval and Renaissance Europe, the Celestial Alphabet was frequently inscribed on talismans to draw down celestial influences and protect the bearer from harm.

Runes were also extensively used in talismanic magic by the Germanic peoples. Runes were carved into stones, weapons, and jewelry, with each rune representing specific protective or empowering qualities. The act of carving the rune was itself a ritual, believed to imbue the object with the rune’s inherent power.

=== Ritual use ===
Magical alphabets also play a crucial role in ceremonial magic, where they are used to invoke spirits, deities, or other supernatural entities. In these contexts, the act of writing or speaking the letters is considered a potent magical act, capable of opening channels between the physical and spiritual worlds.

In Enochian magic, developed by John Dee and Edward Kelley, the Enochian alphabet is central to the rituals designed to communicate with angelic beings. The alphabet is used in the construction of complex magical tables and in the recitation of invocations, with each letter believed to correspond to specific angelic forces. The precise pronunciation and arrangement of these letters are considered vital to the success of the ritual, making the Enochian alphabet one of the most intricate and powerful tools in Western esotericism.

In the context of ceremonial magic, practitioners of the Hermetic Order of the Golden Dawn and similar traditions often use the Hebrew alphabet in their rituals. The letters are inscribed on magical tools, such as wands and pentacles, and are used in the creation of protective circles and invocations. The Hebrew letters, when combined with other symbols and spoken during rituals, are thought to invoke divine or spiritual powers that can be directed by the magician.

=== Divination and mystical exploration ===
Magical alphabets are also employed in divination practices, where the interpretation of symbols is used to gain insight into the past, present, or future. Runes, for instance, are cast or drawn in specific patterns, with each rune’s position and relation to others providing clues about the querent’s situation. This practice, known as runic divination, has roots in ancient Germanic traditions and continues to be popular in modern esoteric practices.

Similarly, the Hebrew alphabet is used in Kabbalistic meditation and divination. The practice of gematria, where letters are assigned numerical values, allows Kabbalists to uncover hidden meanings in sacred texts and to explore the mystical connections between different concepts. By meditating on specific letter combinations or words, practitioners seek to attain deeper spiritual understanding or to predict future events.

The Theban alphabet, while primarily used for encoding secret texts, is also occasionally used in divination, particularly in modern Wiccan practices. The letters may be inscribed on stones or cards, which are then used in divinatory spreads to provide guidance on various aspects of life.

=== Role in modern practices ===
In contemporary esotericism, magical alphabets continue to be a vital part of both traditional and eclectic magical practices. They are frequently incorporated into the design of modern talismans, used in spellwork, and serve as a means of connecting with the ancient traditions from which they originate. The enduring appeal of these alphabets lies in their ability to encode complex mystical and spiritual ideas into simple yet potent symbols, making them accessible tools for both novice and experienced practitioners.

== See also ==
- Runic inscriptions – Inscription made in a runic alphabet
- Runic magic – Ancient or modern magic performed with runes or runestones
- Constructed writing system – Writing system specifically created by an individual or group
- Fulu – Taoist magic symbols and incantations
- List of occult symbols
- Magical formula – Words expressing a process in ceremonial magic
- Tolkien's scripts – Component of Tolkien's writings
- Alphabetum Kaldeorum
- Lingua ignota – 12th-century mystical language created by St. Hildegard of Bingen
