= Angelic alphabet =

Angelic alphabet or angelic script may refer to:

- Alphabet of the Magi, a variant of the Hebrew alphabet used for inscriptions in talismans in 17th-century occultism
- Enochian alphabet, an occult constructed alphabet recorded in the private journals of John Dee and his colleague Edward Kelley in late 16th-century England
- Writing systems created by Heinrich Cornelius Agrippa:
  - Celestial Alphabet, a set of characters described by Heinrich Cornelius Agrippa in the sixteenth century
  - Malachim, an alphabet published by Heinrich Cornelius Agrippa in the 16th century
  - Transitus Fluvii, an occult alphabet consisting of 22 characters described by Heinrich Cornelius Agrippa in his Third Book of Occult Philosophy

== See also ==
- Angelic language (disambiguation)
