= Sixth and Seventh Books of Moses =

18th- or 19th-century magical text allegedly written by Moses

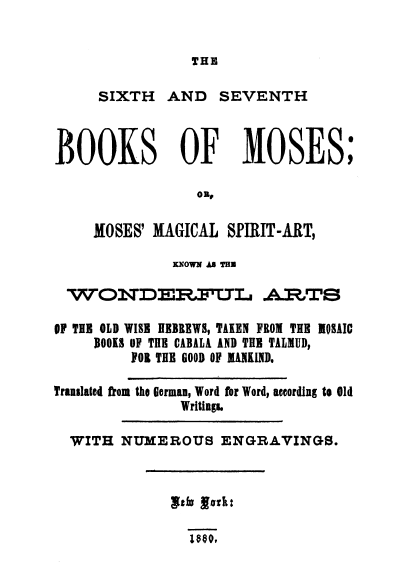
Title page of the 1880 New York edition. Click this image to open a PDF of the entire 1880 edition.

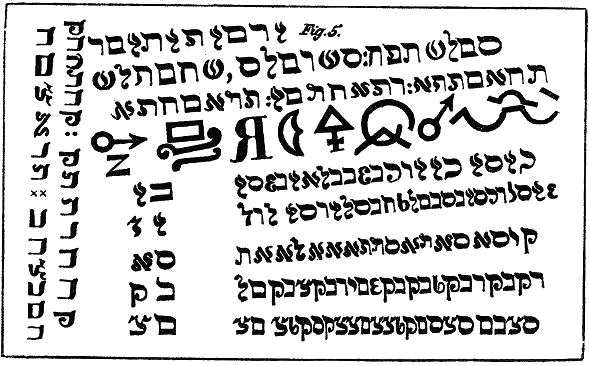
The seal from the Sixth Book of Moses, "The Sixth Mystery: The Seal of the Power-Angels seu Potestatum ex Thoro VI. Bi- bliis arcaiiorum, over the Angels and Spirits of all the Elements", from the 1880 New York edition

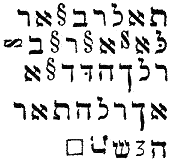
Figure from Vol.II, Formulas of the Magical Kabala of the Sixth and Seventh Books of Moses, "The Spirit Appears in a Pillar of Fire By Night". From the 1880 New York edition.

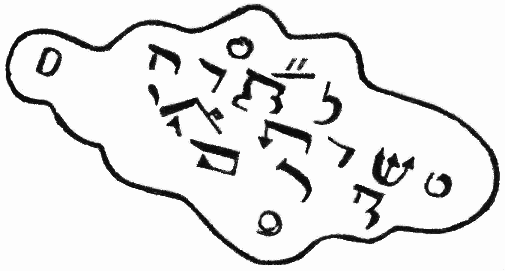
Figure from Vol.II, p. 26 Biblia Arcana Magica Alexander: Tradition of The Sixth Book of Moses, "Figure 81. Breastplate of Moses". From the 1880 New York edition.

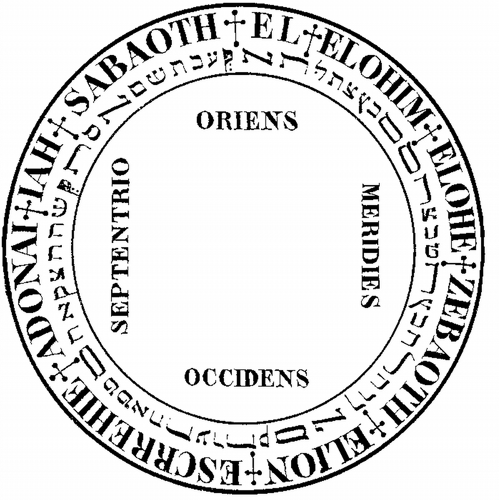
"Circle Written On Parchment In The Blood Of White Young Doves" (Fig. 24, Vol II, p. 40). From "Citation of the Seven Great Princes in The Tradition Of The Sixth And Seventh Books Of Moses", in the 1880 New York edition

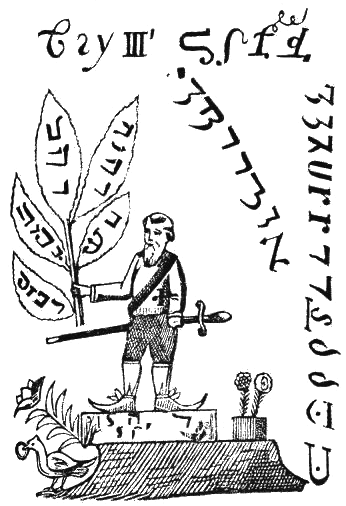
Figure from Vol.II, p. 88 Biblia Arcana Magica Alexander: Tradition of The Seventh Book of Moses, "Diagram Illustrating the Symbols Employed by the Israelites in Their Laws of Magic". From the 1880 New York edition.

The Sixth and Seventh Books of Moses is an 18th- or 19th-century magical text allegedly written by Moses, and passed down as hidden (or lost) books of the Hebrew Bible. Self-described as "the wonderful arts of the old Hebrews, taken from the Mosaic books of the Kabbalah and the Talmud", it is actually a grimoire, or text of magical incantations and seals, that purports to instruct the reader in the spells used to create some of the miracles portrayed in the Bible as well as to grant other forms of good fortune and good health. The work contains reputed Talmudic magic names, words, and ideograms, some written in Hebrew and some with letters from the Latin alphabet. It contains "Seals" or magical drawings accompanied by instructions intended to help the user perform various tasks, from controlling weather or people to contacting the dead or Biblical religious figures.

Copies have been traced to 18th-century German pamphlets, but an 1849 printing, aided by the appearance of the popular press in the 19th century, spread the text through Germany and Northern Europe to German Americans and eventually helped popularize the texts among African Americans in the United States, the Caribbean, and Anglophone West Africa. It influenced European Occult Spiritualism as well as African American hoodoo folk magic, and magical-spiritual practices in the Caribbean, and West Africa.

An older magical text, a fourth-century Greek papyrus entitled Eighth Book of Moses otherwise unrelated to the Sixth and Seventh Books, was found in Thebes in the 19th century and published as part of the Greek Magical Papyri.

== History ==
No first version of this work has been established, but early versions began to appear as inexpensive pamphlets in Germany in the 18th century. Elements of the "Seventh Book", such as "The Seven Semiphoras of Adam" and "The Seven Semiphoras of Moses" appear to have come from the seventh book of the earlier European copies of the Sefer Raziel HaMalakh. The work came to wide prominence when published as volume 6 of Das Kloster (The Cloister) in 1849 in Stuttgart by antiquarian Johann Scheible.

Historian Owen Davies traces copies of the work from the 18th century in Germany. After circulating there, the work was popularized in the United States first in the communities of the Pennsylvania Dutch.

=== Anglo-Germanic American rural folk magic ===
In the early 19th-century, European or European-American grimoires were popular among immigrants and in rural communities where the folk traditions of Europe, intertwined with European religious mysticism, survived. One of the earliest American grimoires is John George Hohman's Pow-Wows; or, Long Lost Friend, a collection of magical spells originally published in 1820 for Pennsylvania Dutch spiritualists known as "hexmeisters", who practiced pow-wow magic (Braucherei in the Pennsylvania Dutch language). The Sixth and Seventh Books was semi-widely used in pow-wow, but it was considered more dangerous than other more standard pow-wow books, because it contained conjuring formulas and other practices closer to black magic.

While versions of The Sixth and Seventh Books were likely passed around German immigrant communities from the late 18th century, the 1849 Leipzig copy was followed by a New York printing, in German, in 1865, and an English translation in 1880. The growth of inexpensive paperback publication in the 19th century, like those of Chicago occult publisher L. W. de Laurence, helped the work gain popularity outside German communities.

Its prominence as a source of popular rural Pennsylvanian and Appalachian "folk magic" spells has been recorded as late as the mid-20th century.

=== Afro-American folk magic and spirituality ===
The boom in inexpensive publishing, and the interest in Spiritualism helped the work gain popularity in the African-American population of the United States, and from there, the Anglophone parts of the Caribbean.

From 1936 through 1972, the folklorist Harry Middleton Hyatt interviewed 1,600 African-American Christian root doctors and home practitioners of hoodoo, and many of them made reference to using this book and other seal-bearing grimoires of the era, such as the Key of Solomon. When Hyatt asked his informants where such books were purchased, he was told that they could be had by mail order from hoodoo suppliers in Chicago, Memphis, or Baltimore.

In the West Indies, the book became one of the central texts of Jamaican obeah and was counted among the founding works of the "Zion Revivalist" Christian movement and the Rastafari movement of the early 20th century. The influential Jamaican musical group Toots and the Maytals, for instance, released in 1963 the song "Six And Seven Books Of Moses": its lyrics list the accepted books of the Old Testament, ending in "... the Sixth and the Seventh books, they wrote them all."

=== Folk magic and spirituality in Anglophone West Africa ===
In early 20th-century British West Africa and Liberia, The Sixth and Seventh Books was adopted widely. It served as a source for "Christian Magic", both by West African spiritualist Christian cults and "assimilated" Africans. In colonial Gold Coast and Nigeria, it was seen as a "western" form of magic that might be used by educated Africans seeking access to Britain or its power, much like Masonic ritual or Rosicrucianism. The Nigerian press in the 1920s regularly featured advertisements for copies of The Sixth and Seventh Books and other Christian occult books.

It was also influential in Christian occult movements in Anglophone West Africa, and West African religious movements which blended Christianity and traditional magic made use of the work. Josiah Olunowo Ositelu's seals and mystical written incantations, used in the Nigerian Church of the Lord (Aladura) were likely derived from the Sixth and Seventh Books.

=== Elsewhere ===
Versions of this work circulated throughout Scandinavia and Central Europe. In Sweden and Finland these books are compiled and published under the titles Den Svarta Bibeln and Musta Raamattu, respectively, meaning "The Black Bible".

== Contents ==
The printed texts of The Sixth and Seven Books of Moses (from 1849) combine two purportedly lost short Biblical texts with several contemporary essays and half a dozen purported writings of those who kept this knowledge and practiced its use through history, dated from Biblical times to the 17th century. These works attempt to paint a portrait of secret knowledge which Moses was given by God, and then handed down father to son until King Solomon, when it was handed to Priests, and finally, Talmudic scholars. In Christian circles, the text appealed to the same authority as did Biblical apocrypha: Biblical texts outside the current Biblical canon.

Containing numerous allegedly magical spells used to summon spirits to do the will of the conjurer, the books are attributed to works in which Moses sets forth the magic which enabled him to defeat the magicians of Egypt, part the Red Sea, and perform the acts attributed to him in the Old Testament. Although these are allegedly Kabbalistic in nature, there is very little or no influence of Kabbala within the pages. Most texts are reputed to be Hebrew, passed to the editors through European Talmudic scholars or Christian Medieval ecclesiastics who were privy to secret Biblical texts. Some of the texts are allegedly translated from a text written by Canaanite magicians and keepers of the Samaritan Pentateuch in the "Cuthan-Samaritan language", a language considered extinct since the 12th century.

No complete manuscripts older than Scheible's 1849 printing are extant, and the claimed origin must be regarded pseudepigraphic and spurious. It is rather of a school of European Medieval and Enlightenment grimoires, such as The Key of Solomon, The Red Dragon, Petit Albert and others. Elements appear directly reprinted from Three Books of Occult Philosophy by Heinrich Cornelius Agrippa (1531) and an 18th-century German translation by Gottfried Selig of the Hebrew Sepher Schimmush Tehillim (The magical uses of the Psalms).

The vast majority of the printed works of 1849, a New York German printing of 1865, and the first English public printing of 1880 are additions to the reputed biblical books. In the 1880 edition, for instance, "the Sixth Book of Moses" and "the Seventh Book of Moses" run only from page 6 to 28, making up 23 of the 190 pages. The vast majority of the work is appendices, restatements of similar seals and incantations, reputedly from those Kabbala teachers to whom this knowledge was passed. Finally, there are sections including lists of the powers associated with each of the Hebrew "Names of God", the powers and use of reciting each of the Psalms and each Hebrew letter.

=== Introduction ===
Scheible also inserted an introduction, "The Magic of the Israelites", taken from Joseph Ennemoser's 1844 Geschichte der Magie. The introduction to the 1880 New York edition explains the genesis of the books.

=== The Sixth Book of Moses ===
These two Books were revealed by God, the Almighty, to his faithful servant Moses, on Mount Sinai, intervale lucis, and in this manner they also came into the hands of Aaron, Caleb, Joshua, and finally to David and his son Solomon and their high priest Sadock. Therefore, they are Bibliis arcanum arcanorum, which means, Mystery of all Mysteries.

— 1880 New York printing, Vol. I, p.6

The Sixth Book includes an introduction along with seven chapters, known as "The Mystery of the First Seal" through "The Mystery of the Seventh Seal". The included pictures of the "seals" consist of various stylized symbols surrounded by pseudo-Hebrew and pseudo-Latin phrases and letters. Each "Seal" or "Table" (in the Seventh Book) is paired with an incantation (reputedly Hebrew) and a very brief description of its powers.

=== The Seventh Book of Moses ===
The seventh book is much the same: taking the events of the Biblical narrative of Moses' life (and other Biblical and unknown stories) and gives a reputed pairing of an incantation and a drawn magical object, here called "Tables". There are twelve tables, each said to control powers associated with certain Angels, elements, or astronomical symbols:

1. The First Table of the Spirits of the Air;
2. The Second Table of the Spirits of Fire;
3. The Third Table of the Spirits of Water;
4. The Fourth Table of the Spirits of the Earth;
5. The Fifth Table of Saturn;
6. The Sixth Table of Jupiter;
7. The Seventh Table of Mars;
8. The Eighth Table of the Sun;
9. The Ninth Table of Venus;
10. The Tenth Table of Mercury;
11. The Eleventh Table of the Spirits;
12. The Twelfth Table of the Schemhamforasch.

=== The remainder of Volume I ===
In the New York Edition this is followed by "The Magic of the Israelites", used in the 1849 version as the introduction.

=== Volume II ===
The second volume of the work collects a series of works claimed to be "in the tradition of" the original two books. In the New York edition, this begins with "Formulas of the Magical Kabala of the Sixth and Seventh Books of Moses", which again demonstrates seals and incantations, these said to be the Magic used by Moses himself at various points in the Biblical stories, such as how to turn his staff into a snake or conjure the pillar of fire. They include other incantations, such as the one labeled "These words are terrible, and will assemble devils or spirits, or they will cause the dead to appear." This is followed by works of only a dozen or so pages, all giving similar "Seals" and incantations (often with identical titles, such as "the Breastplate of Moses"). These include "Extract from the True Clavicula of Solomon and of the Girdle of Aaron" (a version of the Key of Solomon grimoire), the "Biblia Arcana Magica Alexander, According to the Tradition of the Sixth and Seventh Books of Moses, Besides Magical Laws", and the "Citation of the Seven Great Princes in the Tradition of the Sixth and Seventh Books of Moses" which contains similar seals and incantations with more or less Biblical connotations.

=== Names and psalms ===
These are followed by a long section reputing to explain the powers associated with each of the Hebrew "Names of God", other seals which are to be used with these incantations, the Schemhamphoras of King Solomon (The Semiphoras and Schemhamphorash a 1686 occult book attributed to King Solomon printed by Andreas Luppius), and the powers and use of reciting each of the Psalms and each Hebrew letter. For example:

Psalm 123.—If your servant or journeyman has run away from you, write this Psalm, together with his name, on a leaden or tin plate, when he will return to you.

— 1880 New York edition, Vol II, p. 107.

=== Astrology, cures, and amulets ===
Finally there are sections "Astrological Influence Upon Man and Magical Cures of the Old Hebrews. From Dr. Gideon Brechee's work: The Transcendental, Magic and Magical Healing Art in the Talmud. Vienna: 1850". This is a likely bowdlerizing of Gideon Brecher's Das Transcendetale, Magie, und Magische Heilertarten im Talmud (Vienna: Klopf und Eurich, 1850). This work was one of a school of Wissenschaft des Judentums ("The science of Judaism" in German), a 19th-century movement of critical investigations of Jewish literature and culture, including rabbinic literature, using more or less scientific methods.

After a long treatise on Astrology, a further section lists cures, spells and amulets, and gives a source preceding each, such as

Rabbi Jochanan said: A chief among witches told me: If you meet witches you should utter the following charm: "Hot dirt, in perforated baskets, in your mouths, ye enchanting women. May your heads become bald; may the wind blow away your breadcrumbs; may it scatter your spices; may the fresh saffron which ye have in your hands fly away. Witches ! so long as men were gracious to me, and I was careful, I came not in your midst; now I did, and you are not agreeable to me."

— 1880 New York edition, Vol II, p. 124.

== Editions ==
- A copy of an 1880 English translation of the Johann Scheible version, originally from the Harry Houdini Collection at the Library of Congress is available as: The sixth and seventh books of Moses: or, Moses' magical spirit-art, known as the wonderful arts of the old wise Hebrews, taken from the Mosaic books of the Cabala and the Talmud, for the good of mankind. Translated from the German, word for word, according to old writings". s.n., 1880
- Joseph H. Peterson (ed., with critical commentary). The Sixth and Seventh Books of Moses: Or Moses' Magical Spirit-Art Known as the Wonderful Arts of the Old Wise Hebrews, Taken from the Mosaic Books of the Kabbalah and the Talmud, for the Good of Mankind. Ibis, (2008) ISBN 0-89254-130-X

Магия Моисея (сборник) / Пер. И. Бенгальский, Е. Кузьмин. — СПб.: Издательство «Академия исследований культуры», 2024.

== See also ==
- Heptateuch
- Hexateuch
- Jannes and Jambres
- Scrolls of Moses
