= Constructed writing system =

Writing system specifically created by an individual or group

A constructed writing system, or neography, is a writing system specifically created by an individual or group, rather than having evolved as part of a language or culture like a natural script. Some are designed for use with constructed languages, although several of them are used in linguistic experimentation or for other more practical ends in existing languages. Prominent examples of constructed scripts include Korean Hangul and Tengwar.

== Constructed scripts and traditional "natural" writing systems ==
All scripts, including traditional scripts ranging from Chinese to Arabic script, are human creations. However, scripts usually evolve out of other scripts rather than being designed by an individual. In most cases, alphabets are adopted, i.e. a language is written in another language's script at first, and gradually develops peculiarities specific to its new environment over the centuries (such as the letters w and j added to the Latin alphabet over time, not being formally considered full members of the English (as opposed to Latin) alphabet until the mid-1800s). In the vast majority of cases, inventors of writing systems have been either literate themselves or familiar with the concept of writing (see History of writing). As such, constructed scripts tend to be informed by at least one older writing system, making it difficult in some cases to decide whether a new script is simply an adoption or a new creation (for example the Cyrillic and the Gothic alphabets, which are heavily influenced by the Greek alphabet but were nevertheless designed by individual authors).

In the rare cases where a script evolved not out of a previous script, but out of proto-writing (the only known cases being the Cuneiform script, Egyptian hieroglyphs, the Chinese script and the Mayan script, with ongoing debate as to whether the hitherto-undeciphered Indus script and Rongorongo are true writing or proto-writing), the process was nevertheless a gradual evolution of a system of symbols, not a creation by design.

== Overview of constructed writing systems ==
=== For previously unwritten languages ===
Some scripts were invented for spoken languages that did not have adequate writing systems, including the Hangul, Cherokee, Canadian Aboriginal syllabics, N'Ko, Fraser, Goulsse alphabet, Tangut and Pollard scripts. The Armenian alphabet, the Georgian alphabet, and the Glagolitic alphabet may fit in this category, and while their origins and creators are known, it is also evident that they are modeled on some level on the Greek alphabet.

=== For religious and mystical purposes ===
Many scripts are created for religious or mystical purposes. Missionaries and religious scholars may be motivated to devise new scripts for previously-unwritten languages to facilitate the translation of religious writings, as was the case for several of the scripts mentioned in the previous section. Religious leaders may promulgate new writing systems among their followers for liturgical use and/or the promotion of cultural identity and unity, as with Sorang Sompeng, Medefaidrin and the script invented by the Zomi religious leader Pau Cin Hau, among many others. Relatedly, some scripts are created for mystical or magical uses, such as communication with purported spiritual entities. Such is the case with John Dee and Edward Kelley's Enochian language and alphabet, the various scripts (including Celestial, Malachim, Theban, and Transitus Fluvii) documented by Heinrich Cornelius Agrippa and his teacher Johannes Trithemius, and possibly the litterae ignotae devised by Hildegard of Bingen to write her lingua ignota.

Several of these scripts are described by their creators as having been revealed during or developed in response to visionary experiences.

=== In fictional works ===
The Tengwar script constructed for Tolkien's languages. He also created a mode for English.

The best-known constructed scripts dedicated to fictional languages are J. R. R. Tolkien's elaborate Tengwar and Cirth, but many others exist, such as the pIqaD script for Star Trek's Klingon language, and D'ni from the Myst series of video games.

Other works stop short of creating entire languages, and instead use constructed scripts as substitution ciphers or alternate orthographies for existing languages- English-language examples include the script of the Orokin language (referred to by members of the community as "Tennobet", a portmanteau of "Tenno" and "alphabet") from the video game Warframe, the unnamed New World script from Kirby and the Forgotten Land, Aurebesh from Star Wars, and the alien writing appearing in the television series Futurama.

=== For technical purposes ===
Several writing systems have been devised for technical purposes by specialists in various fields. One of the most prominent of these is the International Phonetic Alphabet (IPA), used by linguists to describe the sounds of human language in exhaustive detail. While based on the Latin alphabet, IPA also contains invented letters, Greek letters, and numerous diacritics. Other scripts, such as John Malone's Unifon, Sir James Pitman's Initial Teaching Alphabet, and Alexander Melville Bell's Visible Speech were invented for pedagogical purposes. Yerkish, a communication system created for use by non-human primates, involves a system of lexigrams- visual symbols corresponding to various objects and ideas. Shorthand systems may be considered constructed scripts intended to facilitate speed and ease of writing.

=== Language reform ===
Some constructed scripts are intended to replace existing writing systems. In the mid-1800s, the Church of Jesus Christ of Latter-day Saints promoted the Deseret alphabet as an alternative writing system better suited to English phonology; roughly a century later, the estate of Irish playwright George Bernard Shaw commissioned the Shavian alphabet (later developed into Quikscript) to serve similar aims. Graphic Designer Bradbury Thompson's Alphabet 26 represents a similar project. (see also: English-language spelling reform). Taking language reform further, various proposed philosophical or auxiliary languages- such as aUI, Solresol, and the language outlined in John Wilkins' 1668 An Essay Towards a Real Character, and a Philosophical Language have associated writing systems. Charles K. Bliss's Blissymbols represent a proposed international auxiliary language whose primary mode is written rather than spoken.

=== Other ===
Several constructed scripts serve unique purposes not outlined above. Ong Kommandam's Khom Script, in addition to serving a religious role, was used to conceal military communications during the Holy Man's Rebellion. Around the turn of the 18th century, Frenchman George Psalmanazar invented a purported 'Formosan' alphabet to further his fraudulent claims of being the first Taiwanese visitor to Europe; the Coelbren y Beirdd alphabet invented by Iolo Morganwg is another such example of linguistic forgery. Braille and most other tactile alphabets were invented to serve the needs of the visually impaired, or, in the case of Lewis Carroll's Nyctography, of sighted people without access to light.

== Encoding ==
Some neographies have been encoded in Unicode, in particular the Shavian alphabet and the Deseret alphabet. A proposal for Klingon pIqaD was turned down because most users of the Klingon language wrote it using the Latin alphabet, but both Tengwar and Cirth were under consideration in 2010. An unofficial project exists to coordinate the encoding of many constructed scripts in specific places in the Unicode Private Use Areas (U+E000 to U+F8FF and U+000F0000 to U+0010FFFF), known as the ConScript Unicode Registry.

Some of the scripts have identifying codes assigned among the ISO 15924 codes and IETF language tags.

== See also ==
- Asemic writing – Wordless open semantic form of writing
- Palaeography – Study of historical handwriting and manuscripts
- Pasigraphy – Writing system wherein each symbol represents a concept
- Voynich manuscript – 15th-century codex in an unknown script
- List of constructed scripts
- List of writing systems
- Origin of Hangul
