= John French (physician) =

English physician

John French (1616–1657) was an English physician known for his contributions to chemistry (in particular, distillation) as well as for his English translations of Latin and German works.

== Life ==
He was born in 1616 at Broughton, near Banbury, Oxfordshire. He obtained a B.A. degree from Oxford University in 1637 and an M.A. in 1640, qualifying as a physician with an MD in 1648. He died in 1657 near Boulogne while serving as a physician to the English army. He left a widow, Mary, and a son, John.

He lived at a time when the new science of chemistry was developing from alchemy and was an enthusiast for its application to medicine. He was known for his extensive knowledge of chemistry and was respected by scientists of the time such as Robert Boyle.

== Works ==
Title page of The Art of Distillation (1651).

John French is chiefly remembered for publishing in 1651 The Art of Distillation, a detailed handbook of knowledge and practice at the time, said to be possibly the earliest definitive book on distillation. However, it has been claimed that much of it was a translation of an earlier (1500) German text by Hieronymus Brunschwig.

John French was also the translator of Three Books of Occult Philosophy in 1651 (original: De Occulta Philosophia libri tres by Heinrich Cornelius Agrippa, although he was only identified as J.F. in that work. All other English translations of the book available have been merely edited versions of his work.
