= Saanjo =

Invented script for the Punjabi language

Saanjo is an invented script for the Punjabi language in Pakistan developed by Ejaz Mahmood, Nadeen Asghas, and Nasir Ali. It is an abugida, written from left-to-right, that consists of 38 consonants, 11 vowels, 10 combining marks, 8 punctuation marks, and one space character. The script was inaugurated in 3 December 2005 at Lahore. It has been proposed to be included in the Universal Coded Character Set but has not been approved due to limited usage. Computer fonts have been developed for the script.
