= Angelic language =

Angelic language, language of angels, or tongues of angels may refer to:

- Angelic tongues, the languages believed by some religious traditions to be used by angels
- Enochian, an occult constructed language recorded in the private journals of John Dee and his colleague Edward Kelley in late 16th-century England
- Language of Angels, a 2000 play by Naomi Iizuka
- Speaking in tongues, a phenomenon or practice in which people utter words or speech-like sounds, often thought by believers to be languages unknown to the speaker
- Tongues of angels, languages mentioned by Paul the Apostle in the First Epistle to the Corinthians
- "Tongues of Angels" (Studio One), an episode of the television series Studio One

== See also ==
- Angelic alphabet (disambiguation)
