= Rehmeyer's Hollow =

House in Pennsylvania

Coordinates: 39.8044439°N 76.6504456°W

Rehmeyer's Hollow (or Hex Hollow) is an area of York County, Pennsylvania, located in North Hopewell Township, near Winterstown.

The area is named after the extended Rehmeyer family, who began settling the hollow in 1844.

Despite being a popular tourist destination, the house is private property owned by one of Rehmeyer's descendants, and has a security system installed.

== Murder of Nelson Rehmeyer ==
In November 1928, under the advice of a woman named Emma Knopp (more commonly known as Nellie Noll due to a work of fiction), John Blymire believed that he had been cursed by Nelson Rehmeyer, a practitioner of powwow. On November 27, 1928, Blymire and his accomplices called on Rehmeyer at his home hoping to find his copy of the powwow book the Long Lost Friend and also get a lock of his hair. Knopp advised him to burn the book and bury the lock of hair eight feet underground.

Blymire and his fellow conspirators John Curry and Wilbert Hess (who likewise felt victimized by Rehmeyer) demanded Rehmeyer hand over the book and lock of hair. When he refused, they beat him to death in hopes that this would lift the curse. The three men also set fire to the body, hoping the body and house would burn completely, in attempts to destroy evidence of the murder.

However, the house did not burn down as they had hoped. Rehmeyer's charred corpse was discovered a couple days later on November 29, Thanksgiving Day of that year. Some people believed Rehmeyer's alleged powers prevented the house from burning. The three killers were brought to trial in January 1929, which caused a media sensation.
