= Transitus Fluvii =

Occult alphabet

- Script type: Alphabet
- Creator: Heinrich Cornelius Agrippa
- Period: 16th century CE
- Languages: Derived from Hebrew

Related scripts
- Parent systems: Hebrew: Transitus Fluvii
- Sister systems: Celestial, Malachim

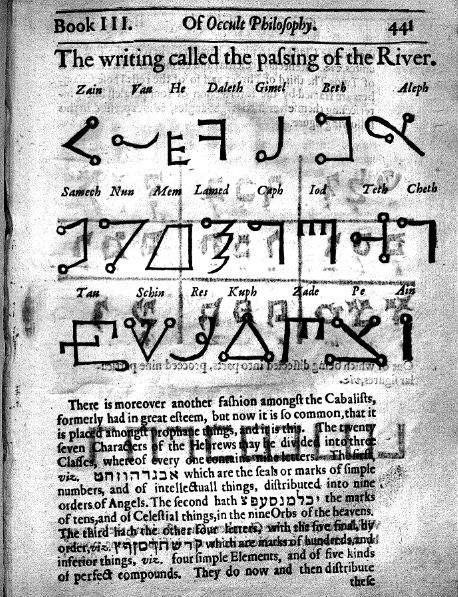
Passing of the River script, described by Agrippa in Of Occult Philosophy, English edition

Transitus Fluvii ("passing through the river" in Latin) or Passage Du Fleuve (in French) is an occult alphabet consisting of 22 characters described by Heinrich Cornelius Agrippa in his Third Book of Occult Philosophy (Cologne, 1533, but written around 1510). It is derived from the Hebrew alphabet and is similar to the Celestial and Malachim alphabets. The name may refer to the crossing of the Euphrates by the Jews on their return from the Babylonian captivity to rebuild the Temple in Jerusalem.

This alphabet can also be found in Abraham de Balmis Peculium Abrae. Grammatica hebraea una cum latino, Venetiis, 1523, sig. B6v. as well as in Geoffroy Tory, Champ Fleury, Paris 1529, f. 76v ubi tamen: "Lettres Chaldaiques", and Giovanni Agostino Panteo's (Pantheus) Voarchadumia contra alchimiam, Venice, 1530, pp. 545–46. Pantheus claims that, while the Hebrew alphabet was entrusted to Moses and Enochian to Enoch, the Transitus Fluvii was entrusted to Abraham.

== Appearances in popular culture ==
The alphabet is depicted in the movie The Blair Witch Project. It is also referenced in the book An Enemy at Green Knowe, part of the Green Knowe series by British author Lucy Boston.
