= Claude Duret =

French botanist, historiographer and linguist (c. 1570–1611)

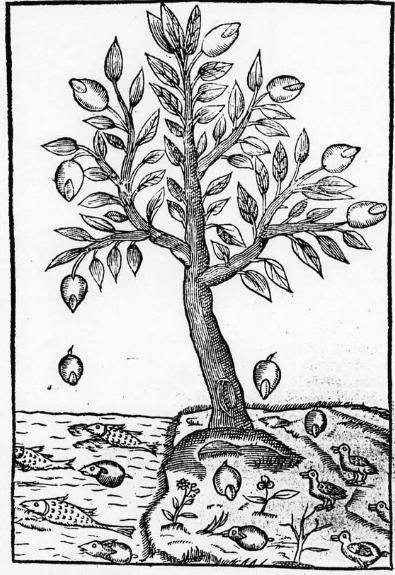
Illustration from Duret's Histoire Admirable des Plantes (1605)

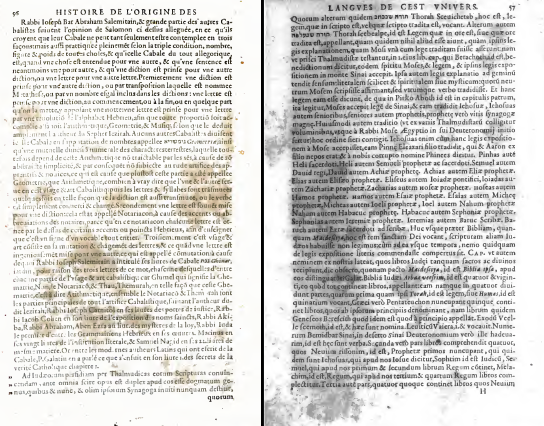
Thrésor de l'histoire des langues de cest univers https://archive.org/details/bub_gb_u7iC2GQWUI8C

Claude Duret (c. 1570–1611) was a French judge, botanist, historiographer and linguist. He was a close friend of agriculturalist Olivier de Serres (1539–1619).

He was a son of Louis Duret, personal physician to the French kings Charles IX and Henry III, and the father of Noël Duret, cosmographer to Louis XIII.

Duret was an advocate of transmutation of species. He was the author of Histoire Admirable des Plantes (1605), which contained a passage that described falling tree leaves striking water and transforming into fishes and upon land into birds. Biologist Henry de Varigny wrote that the book "contains evolutionary notions of a very queer sort. He fully believes that many aquatic birds, as well as many sorts of insects, are generated from the rotten wood of trees."

== Publications ==
Works by Duret include:

- Discours de la vérité des causes et effects des décadences, mutations, changements, conversions et ruines des monarchies, empires, royaumes et républiques... (Paris, 1595),
- Discours de la Vérité des Causes et effets des décadences, mutations etc des Monarchies, Empires et Républiques; selon l'opinion des anciens et modernes mathématiciens, Astrologues, mages, etc. [Lyon, 1595),
- Histoire admirable des plantes et herbes esmerveillables et miraculeuses en nature (Paris, 1605),
- Thrésor de l'histoire des langues de cest univers, contenant les origines, beautés... décadences, mutations... et ruines des langues hébraïque, chananéenne... etc., les langues des animaux et oiseaux (Coligny, 1613)
