= Braucherei =

System of American folk religion

Braucherei or Brauche (Pennsylvania Dutch language), in English commonly called powwow or pow-wow, is a system of Christian folk practice originating in the culture of the Pennsylvania Dutch in the 1700s. Braucherei includes a range of healing rituals used primarily for treating ailments in humans, livestock, and crops, as well as securing physical and spiritual protection, and a wide range of everyday uses. Along with folk plant medicine, Braucherei forms one of two traditional healing practices among the Pennsylvania Dutch, although some researchers consider them to be the one and the same.

Although the term powwow is a Native American loanword into English, these non-Native folk practices by European immigrant settlers are of European origin and were brought to colonial Pennsylvania in the transatlantic migrations of German-speaking people from Central Europe in the seventeenth and eighteenth centuries. Braucherei draws from earlier material in German-speaking Europe, including European grimoires, folk belief, and a variety of Christian texts. Like most folk traditions, Braucherei practices changed and evolved over the years. Braucherei has been described by scholars as a part of a broader spectrum of North American healing traditions categorized by the blending of ritual, healing and faith.

The practice has been influential in American folk culture, with scholars noting that it seems to have been influential especially in Appalachia and the rural South and the Ozarks. Braucherei was highly visible in population centers in the region until the 1920s. In more recent times it has inspired new religious movements. It remains a subject of study among scholars and a point of public interest.

== Terminology ==
Powwowing is the most commonly used English language term to refer to the ritual traditions of the Pennsylvania Germans. The word powwow is a borrowing into English from Narragansett and Massachusett languages, where it meant 'Indigenous priest, shaman, healer' and ultimately derives from Proto-Algonquian *pawe·wa, meaning 'he (who) dreams'. The word has been in use in English in the region since the 1600s. The use of the word powwow in this context in Pennsylvania may originate from perceived similarities among Pennsylvania Dutch healing practices and those of Native Americans. The term powwow appears in an English language edition from around 1900 of Hohman's Der lange verborgene Freund (Pow-Wows; or, Long Lost Friend). Hohman's book was influential in regions like Appalachia in the early 20th century and in the Ozarks and the use of the word power doctor there (compare powwow doctor) may be a result of the influence of Pennsylvania German powwow.

Claimed Native American connections, however spurious, were a key element of the 19th century development of American Spiritualism. Although some powwowers of Native American descent have practiced powwow and some powwowers have claimed that Native American spirit guides have assisted them in healing rituals, the tradition is distinct from the Native American practice of powwow. The "powwow doctor" (in the Ozarks, known as a "power doctor") was also a common role across the country at this era's medicine shows.

In the Pennsylvania Dutch language, these practices are known as Brauche or Braucherei and in the folk tradition they are contrasted with Hexerei ('black magic') performed by Hexe ('witches' or 'sorcerers'). For example, the Braucher is typically called upon to remove a curse placed by a Hex on someone but the division between the two can be ambiguous. The Pennsylvania German words Brauche and Braucherei are often translated as "trying" and "treating" but other proposals include "blessing" (from an iteration on the Hebrew bracha), "needing or wanting" (from the High German verb brauchen), or "using" (from the Old High German verb gebrauchen).

Usage and perception of these words do not align among speakers of English and Pennsylvania German. For example, according to Donmoyer:

... in the most basic sense, the English term "powwow" generally holds a neutral connotation, as opposed to Braucherei, which is generally positive to speakers of Pennsylvania Dutch. On the other hand, to some monolingual English speakers, the controversial word Hex can also be neutral. In Pennsylvania Dutch, however, Hex (meaning either a witch or a curse) carries an extremely negative connotation, but Braucher (synonymous with a powwow practitioner) is positive rather than neutral, unless the context is one of humor or disbelief.

Practitioners are variously referred to as powwowers, Brauchers, powwow doctors, Brauch doctors, powwows, brau doctors, hex doctors, or less commonly, in High German, Hexenmeisters. Individuals who oppose Braucherei practices may use the word witch or sorcerer or the Pennsylvania Dutch word Hex. In Pennsylvania German, the infinitive form of 'to powwow' is brauche, and is cognate with older use of the High German word brauchen.

== Practice and diffusion ==
Traditionally, Brauchers use a variety of gestures, body movements, and incantations along with material objects and substances. Incantations are typically performed subvocally (moving lips without making an audible sound), so that the patient can see the act performed but hear nothing. In a publication from 2015, Kriebel says that the incantations were typically memorized as part of oral tradition but also included a variety of texts (see below). The practice flourished until the 1920s, when the practice went underground. Before that, Brauchers could be found advertising their services in Pennsylvania German cultural regions.

Pennsylvania Dutch Braucherei appears to have spread into other regions as Pennsylvania Germans migrated and brought their folk traditions with them, especially but not limited to Appalachia and the Ozarks, influencing or developing into localized traditions.

== Development, use of texts, and 1929 'witch trial' ==
Braucherei as a distinct tradition developed in the 1700s as primarily German-speaking migrants (along with migrants from the British Isles) settled in Pennsylvania. This folk culture developed from a variety of Christian traditions in Europe. Although the population was primarily protestant, elements of Catholic tradition are reflected in braucherei, such as the invocation of Catholic saints for healing.

Historically, Braucherei utilized a corpus of literature, some of which prescribed rituals and incantations. These include the use of Bible verses, John George Hohman's Der lange verborgene Freund (typically rendered in English as 'The Long Lost Friend' but directly 'The Long Hidden Friend'), Albertus Magnus's Egyptian Secrets, or less commonly the Sixth and Seventh Books of Moses. The latter was at times considered a "hex book", a work of the devil (see terminology section above). Brauchers often also produce their own compilations of material and pass them down to others.

Hohman's book was particularly influential among brauchers. Scholar Don Yoder referred to it as "a standard printed corpus of magical charms for the Pennsylvania Germans". Der lange verborgene Freund has seen multiple German and English editions. Hohman, a German migrant who arrived in Philadelphia in 1802 and authored a variety of publications before disappearing from the historic record after 1846, remains a mysterious figure. As Yoder summarizes, Hohman was "intentionally or unintentionally, a mystery man, one of the most influential and yet most elusive figures in Pennsylvania German history".

Der lange verborgene Freund functioned as a standardized repertory for many Brauchers, but it was preceded by oral tradition and used in parallel with an independent manuscript tradition, which some Brauchers preferred. Brauchers also used variations on material found in Hohman's book.

Over time, the use of these texts significantly declined among traditional Brauchers. During fieldwork performed in the 2000s, Kriebel found only a single individual who used any manual or spellbook beyond the Bible. According to Kleiber, "It can be speculated that the decline in the use of such books is a result of the 1929 York 'Witch Trial' and the subsequent calls for 'superstition' to be eradicated by the introduction of scientific education." Scholar Gerald Milnes summarizes the situation as follows:

When reporters from New York, Philadelphia, and Baltimore descended on York, Pennsylvania, where the trial was held, the result was a series of sensational reports portraying the Pennsylvania Dutch as backward people mired in superstition. Local officials reacted defensively, ordering a program of scientific education to eradicate this "superstition". Today, perhaps folklorists or anthropologists would enter the discussion and explain Braucherei in its cultural context, but in 1929 the social pressures to conform to the ideology of scientific progress were too great.

After this, Brauchers purportedly became less visible and moved underground, leaving population centers. Braucherei also changed, using fewer texts and objects, and "underwent a shift toward religious healing".

== Status, stigma, and modern reception ==
In a paper published in 2006, scholar David W. Kriebel records that his field research indicated a common perception in the region that the practice had died out and "in fact, fewer than half the people I spoke with had even heard of it". Among the Braucherei patients and practitioners he encountered, some expressed a fear that "others [would] label them crazy, or at a minimum, old-fashioned and 'dutchy.'" Kriebel also witnessed an "opposition to the practice by certain religious individuals who believe either that Braucherei's efficacy derives from the devil or that spiritual healing should be the province of organized churches, as well as by those who believe Braucherei is inconsistent with a modern, scientific worldview". Kriebel was eventually able to identify eight living individuals who continued the practice of Pennsylvania German Braucherei.

Writing in 2017, Kriebel notes that a perception existed in the cultural area that powwowing was a thing of the past. However, since the 2000s:

.. with the publication of books and Internet articles, powwowing has attracted more attention, and the number of openly self-identified powwowers has increased. Much of this increase has been among the neo-pagan and neo-heathen community and has become the centerpiece of a larger movement by younger Pennsylvania Germans and others with esoteric interests to link Pennsylvania German cultural practices to pre-Christian Germanic religions. This contrasts with traditional powwowing as it has been practiced both in this country and among Germans elsewhere, which is founded on a Christian worldview.

Beginning in the 1990s, some elements of Braucherei have been embraced by new religious movements, particularly strains of neopaganism. In 1997, Wiccan and Pennsylvania German descendent Jenine E. Trayer authored HexCraft: Dutch Country Magick under the pen name Silver RavenWolf. Trayer studied under Preston Zerbe, a traditional powwower who worked in Adams and York counties and reinterpreted the material as a pagan practice "disguised" as folk Christianity. Urglaawe (Pennsylvania German meaning 'original faith') is another new religious movement that reinterprets Braucherei traditions in the context of Heathenry and "represents an attempt to connect with and recreate a pre-Christian past" and notably utilizes the Pennsylvania German language. Urglaawe typically avoids the common English term powwow in favor of Braucherei.

== See also ==
- Cunning folk
- Folk healer
- Hex Sign
- Himmelsbrief
- Pentagram
