= Alphabet of the Magi =

Variant of the Hebrew alphabet used in 17th-century occultism

The alphabet, as shown in Claude Duret's Thresor

Alphabet of the Magi is the modern name of a variant of the Hebrew alphabet used for inscriptions in talismans in 17th-century occultism.

It is based on a variant of the Semitic alphabet given by Theseus Ambrosius (1469–1540) in his Introductio in chaldaicam linguam (1539, pp. 202f.) Ambrosius here simply gives variant glyphs of the Hebrew alphabet, labelled Aleph, Beth, Gimel, Daleth, He, Vau, Zain, Hhet, Teth, Iod, Caph, Lamed, Mem, Nun, Samech, Ain, Phe, Zadai, Coph, Res, Sin, Thau. The alphabet is different from the other variants of the Semitic abjad given by Ambrosius in that he mentions that these letters are said to have been invented by Gamaliel and transmitted in the a book called Liber ignis associated with the angel Raphiel.

Claude Duret (1570?–1611) included it in his Thresor (1613, p. 117) under the name "the characters of the angel Raphael", citing Ambrosius.

Edmund Fry included it in his Pantographia (pp. 28–29), stating:

"Theseus Ambrosius asserts that this character was brought from Heaven by the Angel Raphael by who it was communicated to Adam who used it in composing Psalms after his expulsion from the terrestrial paradise. Some authors pretend that Moses and the prophets used this letter and that they were forbidden to divulge it to mortal man."

That alphabet is described in the pseudo-Paracelsian Archidoxis magica, translated into English by R. Turner (1656).

S.L. MacGregor Mathers included it in his 1888 edition of the Key of Solomon (plate XV) under the name "Alphabet of the Magi."
