= Long Hidden Friend =

Folk medicine book by John George Hohman, 1820

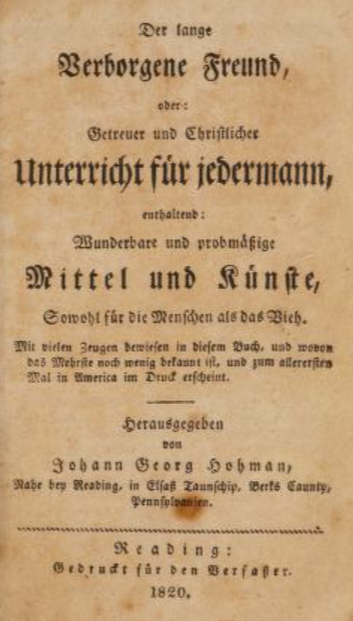
- Title page for Der lange verborgene Freund (1820)
- Author: Johann Georg Hohman
- Original title: Der lange verborgene Freund
- Language: Pennsylvania Dutch
- Subject: braucherei, folk remedies
- Genre: grimoire
- Publication date: 1820
- Publication place: United States

The Long Hidden Friend, The Long Lost Friend, or The Long Secreted Friend (among other titles) are English language titles of a book by Johann Georg Hohman first known to be published in German in 1820 and titled Der lange verborgene Freund. Hohman was a Pennsylvania Dutch powwower and the book is a collection of folk remedies.

Historically, powwowers utilized a corpus of literature, some of which prescribed rituals and incantations. These include the use of Bible verses, Albertus Magnus's Egyptian Secrets, less commonly the Sixth and Seventh Books of Moses, but often Hohman's Long Hidden Friend.

Hohman's book was especially influential. For example, scholar Don Yoder references to it as "a standard printed corpus of magical charms for the Pennsylvania Germans". Hohman, a German migrant who arrived in Philadelphia in 1802 and authored a variety of publications before disappearing from the historic record after 1846, remains a mysterious figure. As Yoder summarizes, Hohman was "intentionally or unintentionally, a mystery man, one of the most influential and yet most elusive figures in Pennsylvania German history".

The Long Hidden Friend functioned as a standardized repertory for many powwowers but it was preceded by and used in parallel with an independent manuscript tradition, which some powwowers preferred. Powwowers also used variations on material found in Hohman's book. Hohman's book was also influential in regions like Appalachia in the early 20th century and in the Ozarks.

Over time, the use of powwow texts significantly declined among traditional powwowers. During fieldwork performed in the 2000s, Kriebel found only a single individual who used any manual or spellbook beyond the Bible. According to Kleiber, "It can be speculated that the decline in the use of such books is a result of the 1929 York 'Witch Trial' and the subsequent calls for 'superstition' to be eradicated by the introduction of scientific education."

== Editions ==
Hohman's book has been published under a variety of titles both in German and in English. Of these, two separate English translations of Hohman's original text circulate:

- The Long Lost Friend (Harrisburg, printed at latest 1850)
- The Long Hidden Friend (Carlisle, printed at latest 1863)

These editions do not provide the names of the translators and are referred to by their publication location. The two English translations notably differ:

1850 German edition:

Eines gutes mittel für die Mutterkrankheit, welches drei Mal gebraucht werden muß.
Leg das oberste Glied am Daumen, das bei der Hand ist, auf die bloße Haut über der Herzgrube, auf das Knöchlein, das heraus steht, und sprich dabei:

Bärmutter, Schermutter, leg dich die nieder in der rechten Statt,
Sonst wird man dich oder mich am dritten Tag tragen in das Grab. †††

Harrisburg:

A good Remedy for Hysterics, (or Mother-Fits,) to be used three times.
Put that joint of the thumb which sits in the palm of the hand on the bare skin covering the small bone which stands out above the pit of the heart, and speak the following at the same time :

Matrix, patrix, lay thyself right and safe,
Or thou or I shall on the third day fill the grave.
†††

Carlisle:

1. A good remedy for Disease of the Womb. It must be used three times.
Place the upper joint of the thumb—the one next the hand—on the bare skin, over the pit of the stomach, on the point of the bone that projects there, and repeat this:—

Uterus, womb, lay thyself down in the right place,
Else thee or me will they carry on the third day to the grave. †††

The term powwow first appears in the title of an English language edition from around 1900 of Hohman's Der lang verhorgene Schatz und Haus Freund (Pow-Wows; or, Long Lost Friend). In 1904, the Journal of American Folklore published a critical edition of the Carlisle edition with commentary from foklorist Walter James Hoffman. In 2012, Daniel Harms published a new critical edition (The Long-Lost Friend: A 19th Century American Grimoire).
