= Speculum Astronomiae =

Medieval published work on astrology

15th-century manuscript

Albertus Magnus produced the Speculum Astronomiae (The Mirror of Astronomy) (de refutatione librorum astronomiae, incipit Occasione quorundam librorum apud quos non est radix sciencie) sometime after 1260 to defend astrology as a Christian form of knowledge (Zambelli, 1992; Hendrix, 2007). Though Albert's authorship of this text has been debated by such scholars as Pierre Mandonnet and, more recently, Nicholas Weill-Parot, some scholars recognized it as a genuinely Albertine work (Mandonnet, 1910; Weill-Parot, 2002; Hendrix, 2010; Thorndike, 1923–28; Lemay, N.D.).

== Background ==
Albert wrote the Speculum in response to the debate concerning medieval astrology. It came to a head with the Condemnations of 1277 at the University of Paris, with Bishop Stephen Tempier's list of 219 propositions that were forbidden to be believed, or indeed even to be discussed (Bianchi, 1999). Bishop Tempier and his allies were concerned that much of the Aristotelian knowledge being integrated into European universities represented a challenge to Christianity. For Tempier, astrology was one of the most problematic areas of knowledge, motivating a sizable number of the condemnations. In particular, he thought that any form of knowledge promising to allow one to predict the future would negate humanity's free will.

== Content ==
Albert, however, built upon an idea originally expressed by Ptolemy in the 2nd century, and summed up by the 9th century Persian scientist Albumasar, as: "The wise man will dominate the stars," to construct an argument that astrology perfected, rather than negated free will (Zambelli, 1992; Lemay, 1962). Albert argued that celestial influence began with God before being transmitted through each of the nine upper spheres of creation, down to the tenth sphere of the sublunar realm, where we all live our lives. As this influence is passed from the stars to each one of the planets and then on to the Earth and its creatures, it picks up accretions that were not part of God's original intent (Hendrix, 2007). Therefore, terrestrial creatures did not receive divine influence in its pure form, but with various changes imparted by the heavenly bodies. These accretions meant that the force of celestial influence lacked God's purity and His ability to enforce change.

Furthermore, the celestial bodies through their corporeal nature caused this flow of influence, which is perceived as visible light, to function as a bodily, rather than a spiritual, force (Hendrix, 2007). Because of this quasi-corporeal status, Albert maintained that the transmitted influence could affect the body, but not the soul. This influence would result in corporeal impulses—such as lust or gluttonous desire—that influenced the soul only indirectly, through the body. Because of this, the person receiving the influence could choose to override it through an act of will. But since most people are perfectly content to be moved along by their physical impulses, astrology would be able to accurately predict future actions in almost every case. However, a knowledge of astrology helps one to resist the influences that celestial bodies impart, therefore assisting one in resisting these bodily impulses. Thus, in Albert's argument, astrology perfects, rather than negates, free will.

== Influence ==
The Speculum became central to the debate about astrology in the medieval, Renaissance, and early-modern periods, with its status as a source not declining until the early seventeenth century (Hendrix, 2007). For more than a dozen generations those who wrote upon astrology almost invariably cited the Speculum or used its arguments, whether to defend celestial divination, such as the 13th century physician Peter d'Abano did, or to attack it as did the 15th century humanist Pico della Mirandola.

== Literature ==
- L. Bianchi, Censure et liberté intellectuelle à l' Université de Paris (XIII-XIV siècles). Paris: J. Vrin, 1999.
- Scott Hendrix, How Albert the Great’s Speculum astronomiae Was interpreted and Used by Four Centuries of Readers: A Study in Late Medieval Medicine, Astronomy and Astrology. Lewiston: The Edwin Mellen Press, 2010.
- Richard Lemay, “The Paris Prohibitions of 1210/15, the formulas of absolution by Gregory IX (1231), and the Incipit of Albertus Magnus’ Speculum Astronomiae. Origin and canonical character of the Speculum Astronomiae.” Unpublished paper, N.D.
- Richard Lemay, Abu Ma’shar and Latin Aristotelianism. Beirut: The Catholic Press, 1962.
- Pierre Mandonnet, “Roger Bacon et le Speculum Astronomiae (1277).” Revue neoscolastique de philosophie 17 (1910): 313- 335.
- Lynn Thorndike, History of Magic and Experimental Science. 8 vols. New York: Columbia University Press, 1923-28.
- Nicolas Weill-Parot, Les “images astrologiques” au moyen âge et à la renaissance: spéculations intellectuelles et pratiques magiques (XIIe-XVe siècle). Paris: Champion, 2002.
- Paola Zambelli, The Speculum Astronomiae and its Enigma: Astrology, Theology, and Science in Albertus Magnus and his Contemporaries. Dordrecht: Kluwer Academic Publishers, 1992.
- Agostino Paravicini Bagliani, Le "Speculum Astronomiae", une énigme? Enquête sur les manuscrits. Firenze, SISMEL Edizioni del Galluzzo, 2001.
