= Three Books of Occult Philosophy =

Book by Heinrich Cornelius Agrippa von Nettesheim

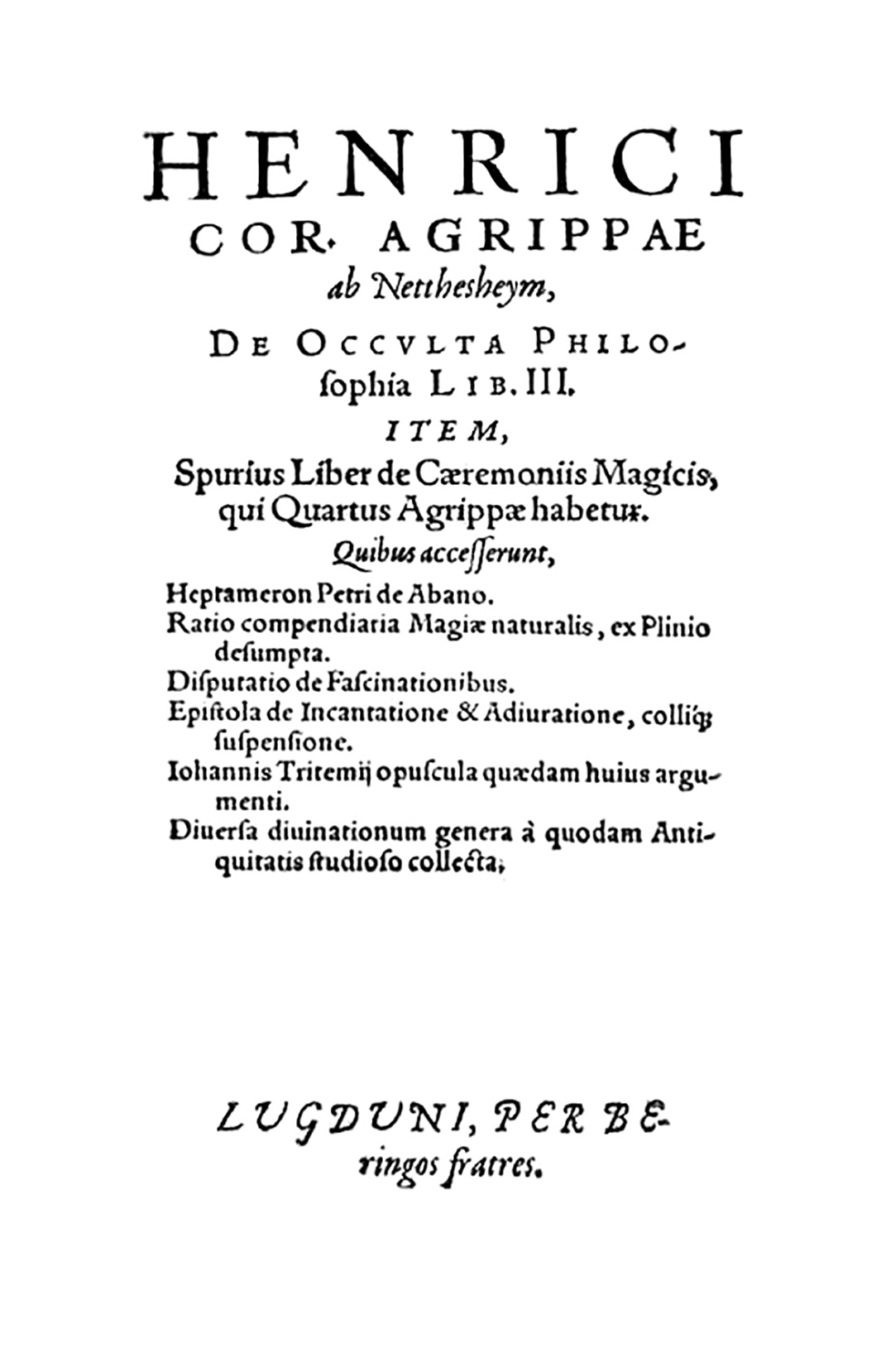
De occulta philosophia libri III

Three Books of Occult Philosophy (De occulta philosophia libri III) is Heinrich Cornelius Agrippa's study of occult philosophy, acknowledged as a significant contribution to the Renaissance philosophical discussion concerning the powers of magic, and its relationship with religion. The first book was printed in 1531 in Paris, Cologne, and Antwerp, while the full three volumes first appeared in Cologne in 1533.

The three books deal with elemental, celestial and intellectual magic. The books outline the four elements, astrology, Kabbalah, numerology, angels, names of God, the virtues and relationships with each other as well as methods of using these relationships and laws in medicine, scrying, alchemy, ceremonial magic, origins of what are from the Hebrew, Greek and Chaldean context.

These arguments were common amongst other hermetic philosophers at the time and before. In fact, Agrippa's interpretation of magic is similar to the authors Marsilio Ficino, Pico della Mirandola and Johann Reuchlin's synthesis of magic and religion, and emphasize an exploration of nature.

== Content and structure of De occulta philosophia ==
Agrippa structured Occult Philosophy into three books, corresponding to three levels of the cosmos and three "forms" of magic. Each book focuses on one realm of existence – the elemental world, the celestial heavens, and the divine or intellectual world – and the occult ("hidden") virtues and correspondences that allow the mage to act within each realm. Together, the books present magic as a holistic science of the universe, uniting natural philosophy, astrology, and theology. Agrippa defines magic as "the absolute perfection of philosophy," a comprehensive knowledge that integrates all fields of learning to harness the hidden connections in nature. He insists that true magic is a noble, sacred wisdom – not the "superstitious" sorcery of common repute – and that when properly practiced it aligns with religious truth and the divine order.

=== Book I: Elemental (Natural) Magic ===
Book I explores the elemental or terrestrial world – the domain of natural magic. Agrippa catalogues the visible and occult properties of natural objects, including stones, herbs, animals, and the human body. He explains that occult virtues in these materials (e.g. the healing power of a plant or the talismanic quality of a gem) derive from hidden correspondences and sympathies that link the material world with higher cosmic principles. In Agrippa's Neoplatonic, "animated" cosmos, all things are interconnected: earthly forms reflect eternal Ideas, mediated through the stars. The magus thus learns how the four elements (earth, water, air, fire) and their qualities combine in natural objects, and how to use those secret properties for effects such as healing, alchemy, or creating magical charms. Central to Book I is the concept of the spiritus mundi or world-soul – an ethereal spirit pervading the world that transmits life and influences. By mastering natural correspondences, the mage can attract and direct this world-spirit, achieving real changes in the elemental realm.

=== Book II: Celestial (Astrological) Magic ===
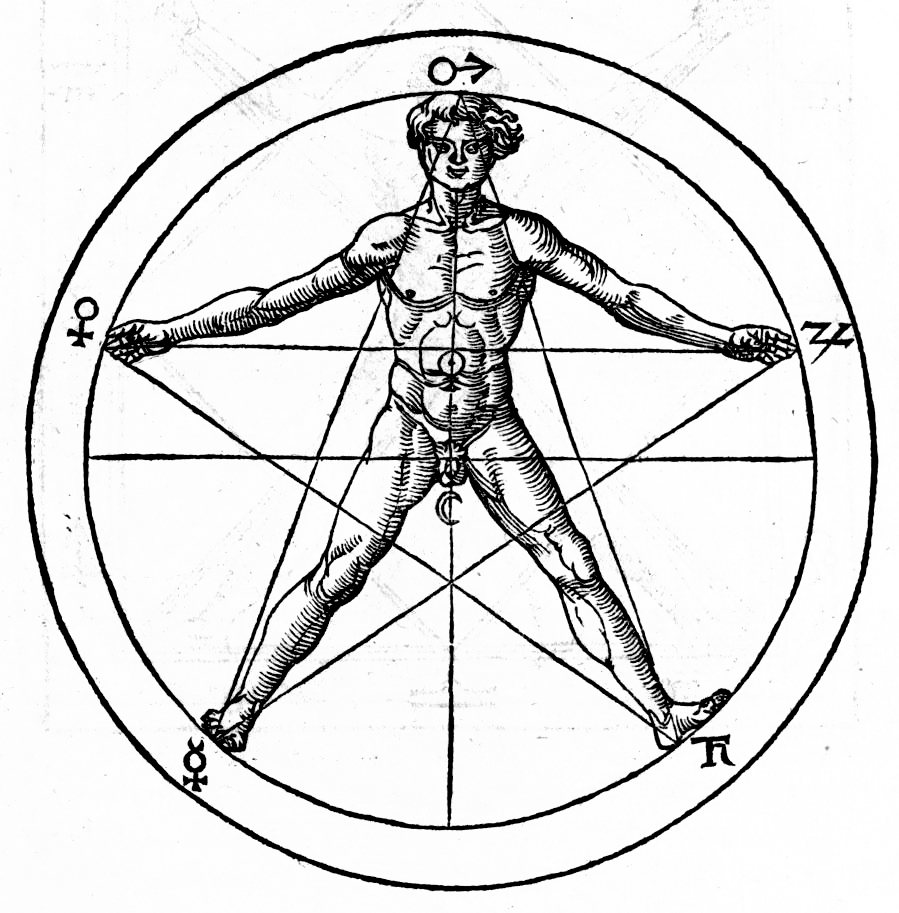
Man inscribed in a pentagram, from Heinrich Cornelius Agrippa's Three Books of Occult Philosophy. The signs on the perimeter represent the 5 visible planets in astrology.

Book II ascends to the celestial or astral world – the realm of the stars and planets – and the practice of astrological magic. It opens with Agrippa's famous image of the magus as a "go-between" uniting the heavens and earth. Here Agrippa details how celestial bodies (the planets, fixed stars, zodiac) emit divine influences that shape the material world. By understanding the "laws governing how the celestial influences flow down to the earth," the magus can "collaborate with nature" and produce desired effects. Agrippa describes the construction and use of astrological images and talismans that capture stellar virtues. For example, a talisman made under a certain planetary configuration can draw down that planet's influence for protection or healing. Book II is highly technical, incorporating astral correspondences, planetary seals, numerology, and the mystical properties of numbers and geometry. Agrippa freely draws on the astral magic teachings of Marsilio Ficino's De vita coelitus comparanda ("On Obtaining Life from the Heavens"), as well as medieval astral magic traditions transmitted via manuscripts from his mentor Trithemius. While rich in practical detail, Agrippa's celestial magic remains within a pious framework: the stars' powers are wielded not as demonic sorcery, but as part of God's design, with the enlightened magus acting as an instrument of divine Providence.

=== Book III: Intellectual (Divine) Magic ===
Book III reaches the summit of Agrippa's system – the intellectual or supercelestial world – dealing with divine or ceremonial magic. Having surveyed nature and the heavens, Agrippa now turns to the realm of the soul, the angelic hierarchies, and God. He "commits the physical and celestial worlds to the protection of religion," asserting that only through religion and virtue can magic be kept free of impious or demonic influence. This book delves into theurgy (ritual magic aimed at contacting divine spirits or angels) and Kabbalah, aligning Agrippa's magic with Christian theology. He describes the names of God, angelic orders, and the Hebrew Sephiroth (divine emanations), synthesizing Jewish mysticism as learned through Christian kabbalists like Johannes Reuchlin. Agrippa insists that the true magus must also be a devout priest-philosopher: moral purification and faith are prerequisites to work higher magic. By piety and the illumination granted by God, the magus elevates his soul, achieving the Hermetic ideal of the "perfect magician and sacerdos (priest)". In practical terms, Book III discusses how to call upon angelic intelligences, use sacred words (including Hebrew divine names and "barbarous" ancient words from pagan theurgy), and perform rituals that draw down spiritual grace. Agrippa carefully distinguishes this holy magic from goetia (base sorcery involving demons) – the latter he condemns as superstition and deception. By the end of Book III, magic stands fully "reformed" as a pious wisdom: a path to spiritual perfection and a means of harnessing divine power for good, in harmony with Christian faith.

== Publication history ==
The first draft of the Three Books was presented by Agrippa in 1510 to Abbot Johannes Trithemius. The text survives to this day and draws heavily from Ficino, Pliny the Elder and Pico Della Mirandola, among other works well known to scholars of the Renaissance.

In 1526–27, Agrippa published a satirical-critical work called De Incertitudine Et Vanitate Scientiarum Liber, in which he seemingly retracted his Three Books, apparently admitting that his occult studies were misguided. However, whether Agrippa was genuine remains a matter of scholarly debate.

The final and complete edition of the Three Books was published in Cologne in 1533. A first English translation was published in 1651.

== Antecedents and influences ==
Agrippa's Occult Philosophy was a product of Renaissance humanism's fascination with ancient wisdom and the prisca theologia (primordial theology). In composing his synthesis, Agrippa amassed a formidable array of sources ranging from antiquity to his own day. Classical and Hellenistic influences are evident throughout the work. He drew upon the Natural History of Pliny the Elder for lore on the properties of stones, herbs, and animals, and cited writers like Ovid, Virgil, and Apuleius for mythic and philosophical insights into nature's hidden powers. The Hermetic writings attributed to Hermes Trismegistus (such as the Corpus Hermeticum and Asclepius) provided a model of a divine, magical cosmos and the idea of humans as microcosms reflecting the macrocosm. Agrippa's cosmology and terminology owe much to Neoplatonic philosophers – Plotinus, Porphyry, Iamblichus, and Proclus – whose concepts of the One, the world-soul, and the hierarchy of being underpin his three-world framework. Notably, the Neoplatonic practice of theurgy (ritual invocation of gods or angels for spiritual ascent) was transmitted to Agrippa via later intermediaries and became the basis for his Book III theurgia. He also adopted the Neoplatonic idea of a chain of being, in which divine influence descends through angels and stars down to material nature, establishing the correspondences that magic exploits.

Medieval and Scholastic sources further enriched Agrippa's synthesis. He was deeply influenced by the medieval tradition of natural magic and encyclopedic occult knowledge epitomized by figures like Albertus Magnus. Albertus's writings on the virtues of stones, herbs, and animals (the Liber virtutibus), as well as the speculative Speculum Astronomiae on astrological images, likely informed Agrippa's own lists of occult properties. The Scholastics provided the philosophical framework of Aristotelian qualities and elements which Agrippa wove into his system of correspondences. Medieval astrological magic texts, including the influential Picatrix (an Arabic astral magic grimoire translated into Latin in the 13th century), were available in manuscript to Renaissance magi like Agrippa; indeed, Agrippa's mentor Johannes Trithemius owned a large collection of magical manuscripts that Agrippa drew upon for Book II's technical details.

Crucially, Agrippa was heir to the 15th-century Renaissance Platonism and Christian Kabbalah movement. He explicitly built on the works of Marsilio Ficino, Giovanni Pico della Mirandola, and Johannes Reuchlin, who a generation earlier had attempted to rehabilitate magic as a virtuous, ancient wisdom. Ficino's De vita (1489) introduced the theory of using astral influences for health and talismans – Agrippa incorporates many of Ficino's "technical details" for harnessing celestial rays. Pico della Mirandola had proclaimed magic and Kabbalah as compatible with Christianity (in his 900 Theses, 1486), calling magic "the most perfect accomplishment of natural philosophy." Agrippa echoes and broadens Pico's vision, redefining magic as "the most perfect accomplishment of the noblest philosophy". From Reuchlin, Agrippa took a framework for integrating Kabbalistic doctrine – Reuchlin's De verbo mirifico (1494) and De arte cabalistica (1517) expounded the power of Hebrew divine names and a tripartite division of magic (natural, celestial, ceremonial). While Reuchlin warned of the risks in each branch of magic, Agrippa was more optimistic: he embraced all three levels (natural, astrological, theurgic magic) as legitimate, so long as they were purified by wisdom and faith. By "thoroughly blending and integrating" these diverse traditions – classical occultism, Hermetic and Neoplatonic philosophy, Jewish Kabbalah, and medieval lore – Agrippa's Occult Philosophy became a monumental syncretic work, effectively codifying the Renaissance occult worldview.

== Reception and influence in the 16th century ==
When Agrippa first circulated De occulta philosophia in manuscript (a draft was completed in 1510), it immediately caught the attention of learned contemporaries. Abbot Johannes Trithemius, to whom Agrippa sent the work, responded with enthusiastic praise, encouraging the young scholar to refine and elevate his magical philosophy. Trithemius's approval gave Agrippa credibility among esoteric-minded humanists. Nevertheless, the controversial nature of the work was apparent from the start. In 1509, Agrippa's lectures on Reuchlin's Kabbalah in Dôle had already provoked a Franciscan friar to denounce him as a "Judaizing heretic," forcing Agrippa to leave his post. This foreshadowed the mixed reception his magnum opus would receive upon publication.

The complete Three Books of Occult Philosophy was finally published in 1533 (Cologne), and reactions among Agrippa's contemporaries ranged from admiration to alarm. Renaissance scholars and occultists welcomed the treatise as a treasure-trove of hidden knowledge: De occulta philosophia was recognized as the most learned and comprehensive exposition of magic available. Students of the occult, such as John Dee in England a few decades later, avidly read Agrippa and built upon his foundation of correspondences and Kabbalistic angelology. Agrippa's immediate followers and friends regarded him as an authority in Neoplatonic and Hermetic philosophy – a true "mage-philosopher." According to one analysis, while Agrippa himself saw Occult Philosophy as a reform of religion and science, his followers revered him as a master of esoteric wisdom, citing his work in support of their own magical and alchemical experiments.

By contrast, religious authorities (both Catholic and emerging Protestant) viewed the book with suspicion. The Catholic Church was quick to place Agrippa's writings on the Index of Prohibited Books: by 1546–1550 De occulta philosophia (along with Agrippa's skeptical tract De vanitate) was condemned in the Louvain and other indexes. Inquisitors and preachers railed against Agrippa as fostering forbidden arts. Not only Catholics but some Protestants too branded him a dangerous heretic or sorcerer. The dense theological justifications in Book III did little to assuage fears – the very idea of a "holy magic" was borderline blasphemous to conservative theologians. Meanwhile, Occult Philosophy also entered the popular imagination: rumors painted Agrippa as a notorious necromancer who trafficked with devils. Folklore spread tales of his familiar spirit in the form of a black dog, and one story (reported by Paolo Giovio) claimed that at Agrippa's death he cast off the dog with the cry, "Go, vile beast, by whom I am brought utterly to perdition" – dramatizing his final renunciation of the devil's companion. Such legends, though apocryphal, testify to how Agrippa's work was received with a mix of fascination and fear. As historian Frances Yates observed, Agrippa's Occult Philosophy stood "central not only to the spread of Renaissance magic but also to the reaction against it".

Yet despite official censure, the book's influence among intellectuals was significant in the 16th century. Successive occult philosophers – Giambattista della Porta (author of Natural Magic, 1558), John Dee (whose Monas Hieroglyphica, 1564, shows Kabbalistic-magical thinking akin to Agrippa's), Paracelsian physicians, and others – were indebted to Agrippa's synthesis of magic and science. Even Giordano Bruno, while charting his own bold course in Hermetic philosophy in the late 1500s, acknowledged Agrippa as a pioneer of the magia naturalis and magia divina that Bruno sought to advance. Thus, by the end of the 16th century, Three Books of Occult Philosophy had secured a dual legacy: it was revered in occult circles as an essential textbook of the magical arts, and reviled by orthodox authorities as a dangerous repository of heresy.

== Enduring legacy in Western esotericism ==
Title page of the first English edition of Heinrich Cornelius Agrippa's De occulta philosophia.

In the following centuries, Agrippa's Occult Philosophy continued to wield a profound influence on the Western esoteric tradition, earning a reputation as a classic of magic. An English translation in 1651, by "J. F." (John French or James Freake), disseminated Agrippa's teachings to a broader audience in the Anglophone world, where it became a reference for scholars, alchemists, and "cunning-men." Rosicrucian-era mystics and Baroque occult philosophers (c. 17th century) cited Agrippa's authority; for instance, Robert Fludd and Athanasius Kircher engaged with ideas of cosmic harmony and Kabbalah that were present in Occult Philosophy. However, even as esoteric study quietly persisted, the public image of Agrippa in the 17th century increasingly mirrored the Faust legend. The figure of "Cornelius Agrippa" appeared in literature as the archetypal conjurer: Christopher Marlowe's Doctor Faustus (1592) explicitly name-drops Agrippa as a notorious source of forbidden knowledge. Later, Goethe's Faust (1808) also alludes to Agrippa as a predecessor in the dark arts. Indeed, the enduring Faust mythos – about a scholar who sells his soul for magical power – amalgamated several historical occultists, and Agrippa (with his black dog legend and heretical repute) provided key inspiration for this character.

By the 18th century, as the Enlightenment took hold, occult philosophy fell out of favor in educated circles, and Agrippa's work receded from mainstream intellectual discourse. Some Enlightenment thinkers retrospectively classed Agrippa as an exemplar of Renaissance superstition – a curiosity of a bygone age of magic. Yet, interestingly, a counter-current viewed Agrippa in a more positive light as an early "proto-scientist." Enlightenment readers noted that Agrippa advocated experience and experiment (even if in magical guise) and that his compilation of natural phenomena prefigured scientific data-gathering. In Mary Shelley's novel Frankenstein (1818), the young Victor Frankenstein is inspired by reading Agrippa, Paracelsus, and Albertus – anachronistic choices by Shelley, but meant to show how early science was intertwined with the occult. Shelley's portrayal reflects an 18th–19th century perspective that figures like Agrippa were part of the prehistory of science, their occultism reframed as misguided but imaginative inquiry into nature. Still, the dominant view in the 19th century among positivist scholars was dismissive: Agrippa was often portrayed as a charlatan or occult fanatic whose work, while culturally influential, was intellectually "vain" (ironically echoing Agrippa's own De vanitate). This dismissive attitude prevailed in academia into the early 20th century.

A major revival of interest in Agrippa's Occult Philosophy occurred in the late 19th and early 20th centuries, paralleling the rise of the modern occult movement. The late 1800s occult revival – led by figures like Eliphas Lévi, Helena Blavatsky, and esoteric orders such as the Hermetic Order of the Golden Dawn – rediscovered Renaissance sources to legitimize and elaborate their systems. Agrippa's work, with its exhaustive tables of correspondences (linking planets, plants, stones, angels, etc.), was mined as a foundational text. Lévi frequently mentioned Agrippa as one of the great "initiates" of magic, and Golden Dawn adepts incorporated many Agrippan correspondences into their rituals and teachings (e.g. planetary and elemental attributions). In these circles, Three Books of Occult Philosophy effectively served as a compendium of Western esoteric lore. Translated editions were reprinted for occult students (for example, the 1897 reprint titled The Philosophy of Natural Magic). By the mid-20th century, academic interest also resurged. Pioneering historians of esotericism from the Warburg Institute (such as Frances Yates and D.P. Walker) revisited Agrippa's work and re-evaluated it as a serious contribution to Renaissance philosophy rather than a mere book of spells. Yates, in particular, highlighted Agrippa's role in her influential studies on Renaissance Hermeticism, arguing that the "extraordinary strength" of Agrippa's influence had been undervalued and that his synthesis was central to understanding Renaissance thought.

Today, Agrippa's Occult Philosophy is recognized as a landmark in the history of Western esotericism. Scholars view Agrippa as a key link between ancient, medieval, and early modern thought – a transmitter of the Hermetic-Cabalist tradition into the Renaissance mainstream. The work is extensively studied in histories of magic, influencing interpretations of how occult knowledge intersected with science and religion in the 1500s. In contemporary occult and New Age communities, Three Books is frequently referenced as a comprehensive source on magical theory and practice, and some parts of it are still even issued as "secret material". New critical editions and translations continue to appear (a testament to ongoing interest – for instance, a modern scholarly English translation was published in 2021 after 350+ years). Thus, whether as a historical document or a living text for practitioners, Agrippa's Occult Philosophy endures as one of the most influential works in the canon of Western occult literature, bridging the wisdom of the ancients with the seekers of the present.

== Controversies, misinterpretations, and later reassessments ==
Given its subject matter, Three Books of Occult Philosophy has been surrounded by controversy and misunderstanding since its inception. One immediate controversy was Agrippa's own apparent retraction of magic. In 1526, several years before he published Occult Philosophy, Agrippa brought out De incertitudine et vanitate scientiarum ("On the Uncertainty and Vanity of the Sciences"), a satirical treatise that skeptically condemned all human knowledge – including astrology and occult science – as futile. In it, Agrippa seemingly confessed that his occult pursuits were misguided illusions. This blatant self-critique led many to believe Agrippa had repudiated Occult Philosophy even before it was printed. Was the author of De occulta philosophia recanting his own magical system? The question has generated debate ever since. Some contemporaries (and later commentators) took Agrippa's Vanity of Sciences at face value as a sincere repentance, viewing him as having "seen the light" and turned against magic. Others suspect Agrippa's pessimistic Vanity was written in ironic jest or as a strategic ploy to ward off persecution. Modern scholars tend to read De vanitate in context: it may reflect Agrippa's disillusionment with worldly honors and the limitations of human learning, without entirely negating the spiritual magic he advocated. Indeed, when Agrippa finally published Occult Philosophy in 1533, he added a preface admonishing the reader not to misuse the material and to remember that true magic depends on divine grace – perhaps an effort to reconcile the two works. The tension between Agrippa's exaltation of magic and his scathing criticism of it remains an intriguing paradox in his legacy.

Another enduring misinterpretation stemmed from a spurious text falsely attributed to Agrippa: the so-called "Fourth Book of Occult Philosophy." This work, appearing about thirty years after Agrippa's death, was appended to some editions of Occult Philosophy and contained instructions for summoning spirits, demonic invocations, and elaborate ritual magic far more explicit than anything in Agrippa's authentic three books. The Fourth Book (which included material known as the Heptameron on ceremonial magic) was denounced by Johann Weyer, Agrippa's one-time pupil, as a forgery not written by Agrippa. Nonetheless, many readers in the 16th–17th centuries assumed it was Agrippa's work. This misattribution fueled the idea that Agrippa had provided a manual for diabolical sorcery – bolstering his infamous reputation. Critics of magic eagerly pointed to the Fourth Book as "proof" that Agrippa's scholarship led straight to trafficking with evil spirits. Only much later did bibliographers and historians conclusively separate the spurious Fourth Book from Agrippa's genuine corpus. The episode illustrates how Agrippa's name became a magnet for occult lore, accruing additional texts and legends that distorted his actual teachings.

Throughout the centuries, the interpretation of Agrippa's Occult Philosophy has swung between poles of vilification and veneration. In folk belief and ecclesiastical propaganda, Agrippa was long caricatured as a black magician damned for his hubris – an image crystallized by the Faust myth. Enlightenment critics, as noted, dismissed him as a quack or at best an irrelevant relic of mysticism. However, 20th-century scholarship dramatically rehabilitated Agrippa's reputation. Studies in the history of science and esotericism (by thinkers like Frances Yates, Eugenio Garin, and Wouter Hanegraaff) repositioned Agrippa as a serious Renaissance intellectual, albeit an unorthodox one. No longer seen as incoherent or "mad," Agrippa is now understood as a conscious synthesizer of disparate traditions, and as a voice of the Zeitgeist of his era – embodying the Renaissance ambition to recover ancient wisdom and fuse it with Christian thought. This scholarly reassessment has gone hand-in-hand with renewed popular interest. By the late 20th century and into the 21st, occultists and New Age practitioners celebrate Agrippa as a patriarch of Western occultism, and his Three Books are studied both as a historical text and a practical guide. The leader of a modern magical school called "IMBOLC" has named himself after Agrippa, a somewhat anachronistic honor that underscores how Cornelius Agrippa's legacy, though once contested, has firmly endured. Three Books of Occult Philosophy remains at the center of discussions on magic's role in Western culture, continually inviting new interpretations while retaining its aura as a foundational ars magna of occult philosophy.

== Editions ==
- Agrippa, Henry Cornelius (1651). Three Books of Occult Philosophy. Translated by J. F. London: printed by R. W. for Gregory Moule.
- ——— (1898). Whitehead, Willis F. (ed.). Three Books of Occult Philosophy: Book One – Natural Magic. Chicago: Hahn & Whitehead.
- ——— (1913). de Laurence, L. W. (ed.). The Philosophy of Natural Magic. Translated by J. F. Chicago: The de Laurence Company. (Book I, only)
- ——— (1974). Shepherd, Leslie (ed.). The Philosophy of Natural Magic. Translated by James Freake. University Books. ISBN 0-82160-218-7. (Book I, only; reprint of the de Laurence edition)
- ——— (1986). Three Books of Occult Philosophy. Translated by J. F. (Facsimile ed.). Hastings, England: Chthonios Books.
- ——— (2005). Tyson, Donald (ed.). Three Books of Occult Philosophy. Translated by James Freake. Llewelyn Worldwide. ISBN 0-87542-832-0.
- ——— (2020). De Occvlta Philosophia. Vol. I–IV. Translated by Paul Summers Young. Black Letter Press.
- ——— (2021). Three Books of Occult Philosophy. Translated by Eric Purdue. Inner Traditions. ISBN 978-1644114162.

== See also ==
- Classification of demons
- Grimoire
- Hermetic Qabalah
- The Magus, or Celestial Intelligencer
