= Johann Georg Hohman =

American occultist

Johann Georg Hohman (also spelled John George Hohman, and his surname sometimes misspelled as Hoffman) was a German-American printer, book seller and compiler of collections of herbal remedies, magical healings, and charms. He immigrated to the US from Germany in 1802, settled in the area around Reading, Pennsylvania, in the Pennsylvania Dutch community, where he printed and sold broadsides, chapbooks and books and practised and instructed in the arts of folk magic and folk religion which became known as pow-wow. He was active between 1802 and 1846.

Hohman's best known work is the collection of prayers and recipes for folk-healing titled Pow-Wows, or the Long Lost Friend, published in German in 1820 as Der Lange Verborgene Freund (The Long-Hidden Friend) and in two English translations—the first in 1846 in a rather crude translation by Hohman himself ("The Long Secreted Friend or a True and Christian Information for Every Body") and the second in 1856 by a different and more fluent translator ("The Long Lost Friend; a Collection of Mysterious and Invaluable Arts and Remedies for Man as well as Animals"). The name "Pow-Wows" was only added to the book in late 19th century reprints in the wake of the sudden popularity of Spiritualism in the United States, in which "Indian Spirit Guides" were frequently seen during seances.

In addition to "The Long-Lost-Friend," Hohman also wrote and published, or at least had attributed to him, a number of further books in German, including Unsers Herran Jesu Christi Kinderbuch, oder, Merkwurdige Historische Beschreibung Von Joachim Und Anna (Our Lord Jesus Christ's Childhood-Book, or, The Strange Historical Description of Joachim and Anna), and Albertus Magnus, oder, Der Lange Verborgene und Getreuer und Christlicher Unterricht fur Jedermann (Albertus Magnus, or, Long Lost and True and Christian Instructions for Everyone). The last book attributed to Hohman was published in 1857.
