= Malachim =

Alphabet published by Heinrich Cornelius Agrippa in the 16th century

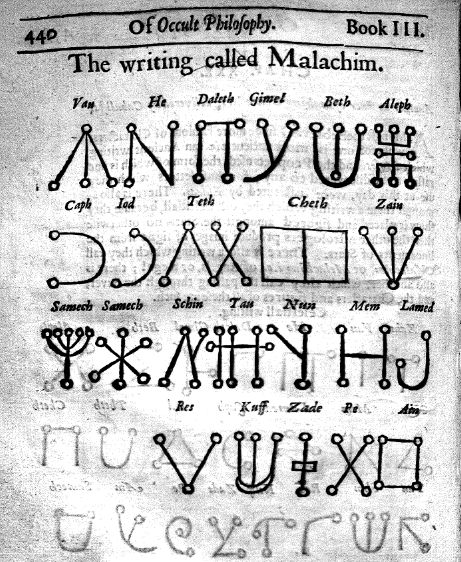
- The Malachim Script, from Agrippa's Of Occult Philosophy English 1651 edition
- Script type: Alphabet
- Creator: Heinrich Cornelius Agrippa
- Created: 1510

Malachim was an alphabet published in the 16th century by Heinrich Cornelius Agrippa, who also created the Celestial Alphabet and Transitus Fluvii.

"Malachim" is a plural form from Hebrew (מלאך, mal'ach) and means "angels" or "messengers."

== History ==
The Malachim alphabet is derived from the Hebrew and Greek alphabets. It is still used by high degree Freemasons to a limited extent.

== Alphabet ==
This version of the alphabet is from Agrippa's Of Occult Philosophy, 1651 edition.

Aleph	Beth	Gimel	Daleth	He	Vau	Zain	Cheth
Teth or Theth	Iod or Yod	Caph or Kaph	Lamed	Mem	Nun	Tau	Shin, Shim or Shom
Samech		Ain or Ayn	Pe	Tzaddi or Zade	Kuff, Qoph or Quph	Res or Resh	
