= Celestial Alphabet =

Occult alphabet

Celestial Alphabet Angelic script
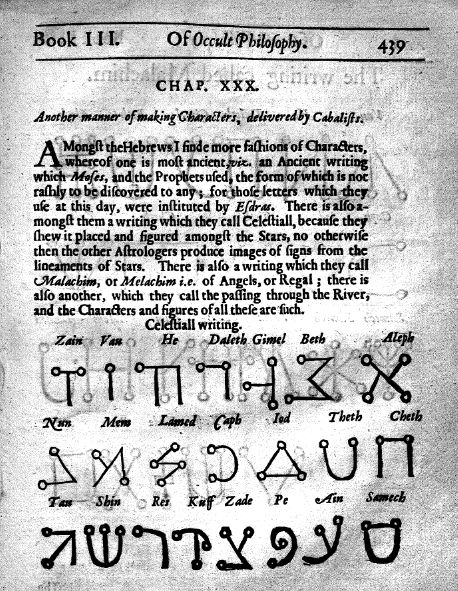
- The Celestial Alphabet described in Agrippa's Of Occult Philosophy.
- Script type: Abjad
- Creator: Heinrich Cornelius Agrippa
- Created: 16th century CE
- Direction: Left to right

Related scripts
- Parent systems: Hebrew alphabet: Celestial Alphabet

The Celestial Alphabet, also known as Angelic Script, is a set of characters described by Heinrich Cornelius Agrippa in the sixteenth century. It is not to be confused with John Dee and Edward Kelley's Enochian alphabet, which is also sometimes called the Celestial alphabet. Other alphabets with a similar origin are Transitus Fluvii and Malachim.

== Origin ==
The language was first made by scholars studying angelic kingdoms, specifically Heinrich Cornelius Agrippa in the sixteenth century. The script was first published in his third book Of Occult Philosophy. The script and language was invented in order to communicate with angels and it was later claimed that these symbols were sent "by God", given to angels, and then passed along to humans. No known major books have come out written in this script.

Nowadays, it is still occasionally used in rituals.

== Style ==
There are 22 known characters, most of which are based around Hebrew names, such as Gimel, Sameth, and Aleph. It is an abjad, meaning there are no vowels. It is read and written from left to right in horizontal lines.
