= Heinrich Cornelius Agrippa =

German occult writer (1486–1535)

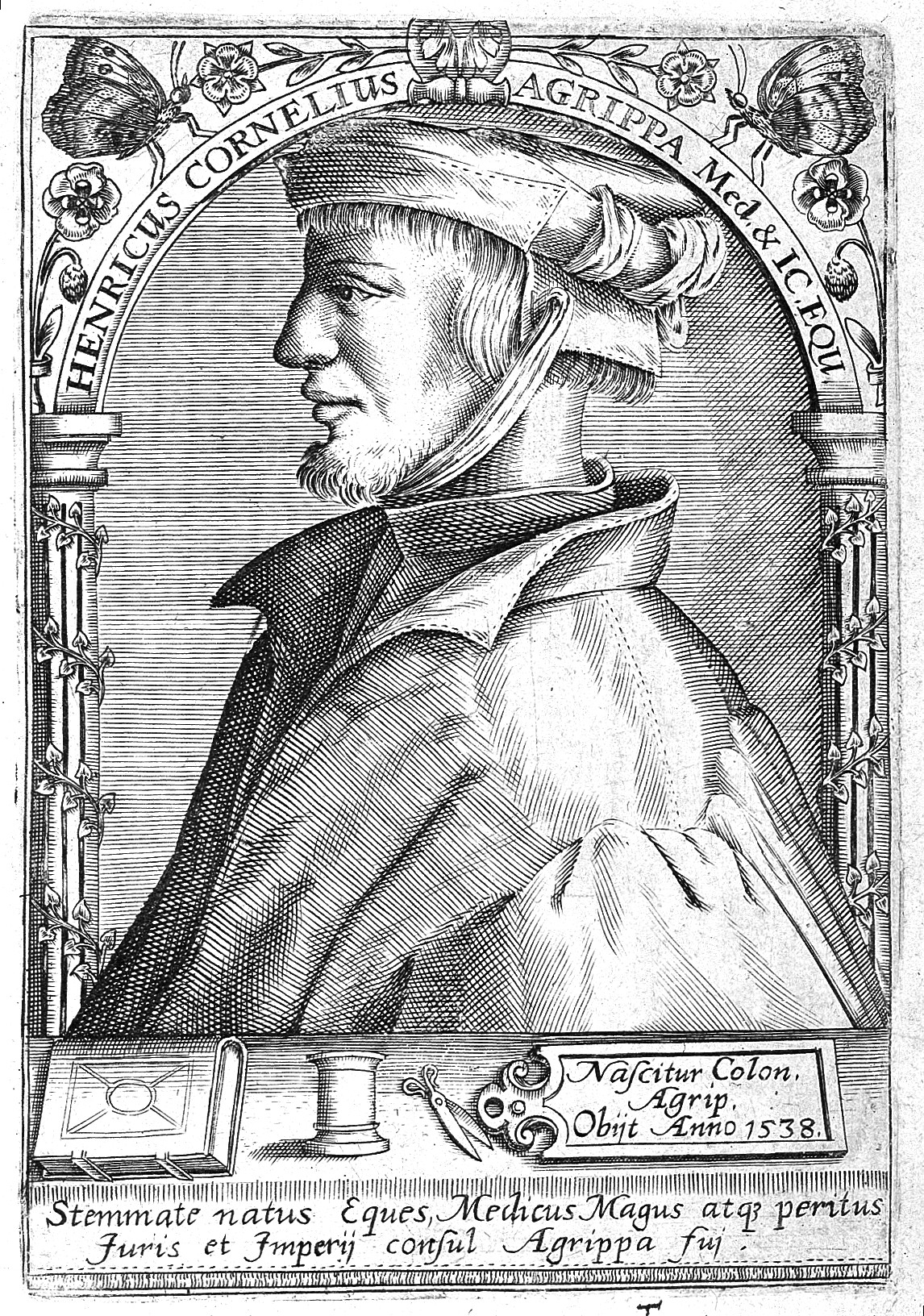
- Engraving by Theodor de Bry, 1598
- Born: 14 September 1486; Nettersheim, Electorate of Cologne, Holy Roman Empire
- Died: 18 February 1535 (aged 48); Grenoble, Kingdom of France
- Occupations: Occult writer, theologian, physician, legal expert, soldier
- Known for: Natural magic

Academic background
- Education: University of Cologne

Academic work
- Institutions: University of Dole; University of Pavia

Heinrich Cornelius Agrippa von Nettesheim (/əˈɡrɪpə/; German: [aˈgʀɪpa]; 14 September 1486 – 18 February 1535) was a German Renaissance polymath, physician, legal scholar, alchemist, soldier, knight, theologian, and occult writer.

Agrippa's Three Books of Occult Philosophy published in 1533 drew heavily upon Kabbalah, Hermeticism, and Neoplatonism. His book was widely influential among esotericists of the early modern period.

== Early life and education ==
Agrippa was born in Nettesheim, near Cologne, on 14 September 1486, to a family of middle nobility. In letters later in life he wrote that members of his family had been in the service of the House of Habsburg, although such claims may have been motivated by a desire to gain the support of potential patrons. On the record of his matriculation at the University of Cologne in 1499, he is listed simply as a citizen of Cologne, and his father's name is recorded as Henricus de Nettesheym. Agrippa studied at the university from 1499 to 1502, (age 13–16) when he received the degree of magister artium. The University of Cologne was one of the centers of Thomism, and the faculty of arts was split between the dominant Thomists and the Albertists. It is likely that Agrippa's interest in the occult came from this Albertist influence. Agrippa himself named Albert's Speculum as one of his first occult study texts. He later studied at the University of Paris, where he apparently took part in a secret society involved in the occult.

== Military career ==
In 1508 Agrippa traveled to Spain to work as a mercenary. He continued his travels by way of Valencia, the Baleares, Sardinia, Naples, Avignon, and Lyon. He served as a captain in the army of Maximilian I, Holy Roman Emperor, who awarded him the title of Ritter (knight).

== Academic career ==
Agrippa's academic career began in 1509, receiving the patronage of Margaret of Austria, governor of Franche-Comté, and Antoine de Vergy, archbishop of Besançon and chancellor of the University of Dole. He was given the opportunity to lecture a course at the University on Hebrew scholar Johann Reuchlin's De verbo mirifico. At Dole, Agrippa wrote De nobilitate et praecellentia foeminae sexus (On the Nobility and Excellence of the Feminine Sex), a work that aimed at proving the superiority of women using kabalistic ideas. The book was probably intended to impress Duchess Margaret. Agrippa's lectures received attention, and he was given a doctorate in theology because of them. He was, however, denounced by the Franciscan prior Jean Catilinet as a "Judaizing heretic", and was forced to leave Dole in 1510.

In the winter of 1509–1510 Agrippa returned to Germany and studied with humanist Abbot of Würzburg Johannes Trithemius at Würzburg. On 8 April 1510 he dedicated the then-unpublished first draft of De occulta philosophia (On the Occult Philosophy) to Trithemius, who recommended that Agrippa keep his occult studies secret. Proceeding to the Netherlands he took service again with Maximilian. In 1510 the king sent Agrippa on a diplomatic mission to England, where he was the guest of the humanist and Platonist John Colet, dean of St Paul's Cathedral, and where he replied to the accusations brought against him by Catilinet (Expostulatio super Expositione sua in librum De verbo mirifico). In the reply he argued that his Christian faith was not incompatible with his appreciation for Jewish thought, writing "I am a Christian, but I do not dislike Jewish Rabbis". Agrippa then returned to Cologne and gave disputations at the university's faculty of theology.

Agrippa followed emperor Maximilian to Italy in 1511, and as a theologian attended the schismatic Council of Pisa (1512), which was called by some cardinals in opposition to a council called by Pope Julius II. He remained in Italy for seven years, partly in the service of William IX, Marquess of Montferrat, and partly in that of Charles III, Duke of Savoy, probably occupied in teaching theology and practicing medicine. During his time in northern Italy Agrippa came into contact with Agostino Ricci and perhaps Paolo Ricci, and studied the works of philosophers Marsilio Ficino and Giovanni Pico della Mirandola, and the kabbalah. In 1515 he lectured at the University of Pavia on the Pimander of Hermes Trismegistus, but these lectures were abruptly terminated owing to the victories of Francis I, King of France.

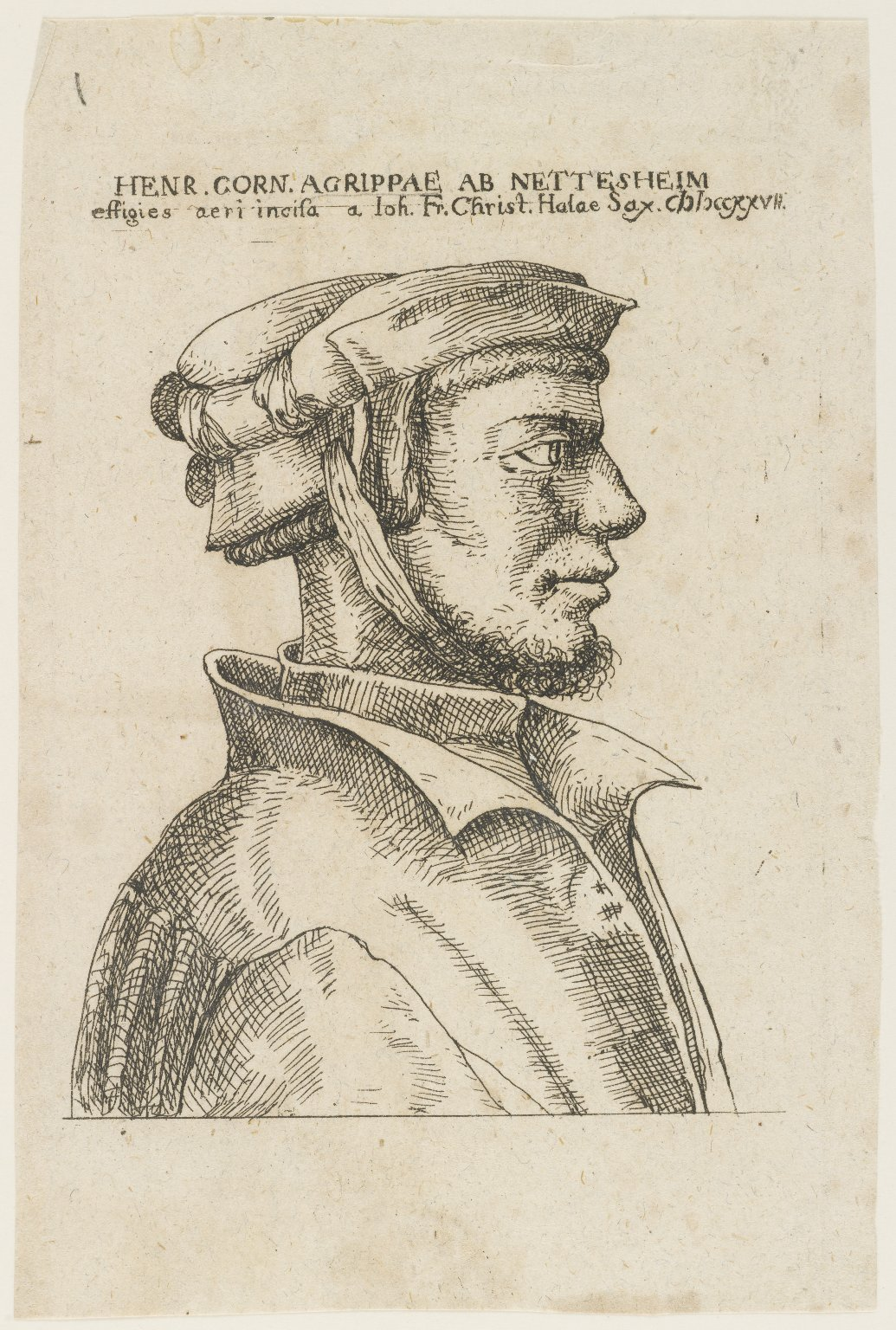
Etching of Heinrich Cornelius Agrippa von Nettesheim

In 1518 the efforts of one or other of his patrons secured for Agrippa the position of town advocate and orator, or syndic, at Metz. Here, as at Dole, his opinions soon brought him into collision with the monks, and his defense of a woman accused of witchcraft involved him in a dispute with the inquisitor, Nicholas Savin. The consequence of this was that in 1520 he resigned his office and returned to hometown Cologne, where he stayed for about two years. He then practiced for a short time as a physician at Geneva and Freiburg, but in 1524 went to Lyon on being appointed physician to Louise of Savoy, mother of Francis I. In 1528 he gave up this position, and about this time was invited to take part in the dispute over the legality of the divorce of Catherine of Aragon by Henry VIII; but he preferred an offer made by Margaret, duchess of Savoy and regent of the Netherlands, and became archivist and historiographer to her nephew, emperor Charles V.

Margaret's death in 1530 weakened his position, and the publication of some of his writings about the same time aroused anew the hatred of his enemies, but after suffering a short imprisonment for debt at Brussels he lived at Cologne and Bonn, under the protection of Hermann of Wied, archbishop of Cologne. By publishing his works he brought himself into antagonism with the Inquisition, which sought to stop the printing of De occulta philosophia. He then went to France, where he was arrested by order of Francis I for some disparaging words about the queen-mother Louise of Savoy, but he was soon released, and on 18 February 1535 died at Grenoble. He was married three times and had a large family.

During his wandering life in Germany, France, and Italy, Agrippa worked as a theologian, physician, legal expert, and soldier. Agrippa was for some time in the service of Maximilian I, probably as a soldier in Italy, but devoted his time mainly to the study of the occult sciences and to problematic theological legal questions, which exposed him to various persecutions through life, usually in the mode described above: He would be privately denounced for one sort of heresy or another. He would only reply with venom considerably later (Nauert demonstrates this pattern effectively).

No evidence exists that Agrippa was seriously accused, much less persecuted, for his interest in or practice of magical or occult arts during his lifetime, although it was known he argued against the persecution of witches. It is impossible, of course, to cite negatively, but Nauert, the best bio-bibliographical study to date, shows no indication of such persecution, and Van der Poel's careful examination of the various attacks suggest that they were founded on quite other theological grounds.

Recent scholarship generally agrees that this rejection or repudiation of magic is not what it seems: Agrippa never rejected magic in its totality, but he did retract his early manuscript of the Occult Philosophy – to be replaced by the later form. (Note: Perrone Compagni (2000), p. 171: "As a Christian magician, Agrippa thinks that the threat of the fire of hell does not menace himself, but rather the quacks, ignorant, and the ‘demoniacal’ magicians, in short, those who are not regenerated and who practice science by replacing the support of faith by the concede of rebellious reason. Therefore Agrippa’s palinode of his earlier curiositas towards magic is by no means a global retraction, but an admission of the limits of his first project, which did not properly take into account the religious roots of the reform of magic.")

In the Third Book of Occult Philosophy, Agrippa concludes with:

But of magic I wrote whilst I was very young three large books, which I called Of Occult Philosophy, in which what was then through the curiosity of my youth erroneous, I now being more advised, am willing to have retracted, by this recantation; I formerly spent much time and costs in these vanities. At last I grew so wise as to be able to dissuade others from this destruction. For whosoever do not in the truth, nor in the power of God, but in the deceits of devils, according to the operation of wicked spirits presume to divine and prophesy, and practising through magical vanities, exorcisms, incantations and other demoniacal works and deceits of idolatry, boasting of delusions, and phantasms, presently ceasing, brag that they can do miracles, I say all these shall with Jannes, and Jambres, and Simon Magus, be destinated to the torments of eternal fire.

— Agrippa von Nettesheim

According to his student Johann Weyer, in the 1563 book De praestigiis daemonum, Agrippa died in Grenoble, in 1535.

== Works ==
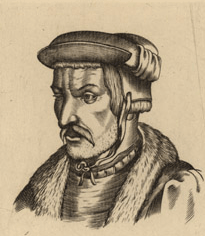
Woodcut print portrait of Agrippa

Agrippa is perhaps best known for his books.

- De incertitudine et vanitate scientiarum atque artium declamatio invectiva (Declamation Attacking the Uncertainty and Vanity of the Sciences and the Arts, 1526; printed in Cologne 1527), a skeptical satire of the sad state of science. This book, a significant production of the revival of Pyrrhonic skepticism in its fideist mode, was to have a significant influence on such thinkers and writers as Montaigne, Descartes and Goethe.
- Declamatio de nobilitate et praecellentia foeminei sexus (Declamation on the Nobility and Preeminence of the Female Sex, 1529), a book pronouncing the theological and moral superiority of women. Edition with English translation, London 1652.
- De occulta philosophia libri tres (Three Books Concerning Occult Philosophy, Book 1 printed Paris 1531; Books 2–3 in Cologne 1533). This summa of occult and magical thought, Agrippa's most important work in a number of respects, sought a solution to the skepticism proposed in De vanitate. In short, Agrippa argued for a synthetic vision of magic whereby the natural world combined with the celestial and the divine through Neoplatonic participation, such that ordinarily licit natural magic was in fact validated by a kind of sourced ultimately from God. By this means Agrippa proposed a magic that could resolve all epistemological problems raised by skepticism in a total validation of Christian faith. The book was a major influence on such later magical thinkers as Giordano Bruno and John Dee. The book (whose early draft, quite different from the final form, circulated in manuscript long before it was published) is often cited in discussions of Albrecht Dürer's famous engraving Melencolia I (1514). One example of the text, not especially indicative of its broader contents, is Agrippa's analysis of herbal treatments for malaria in numeric terms:
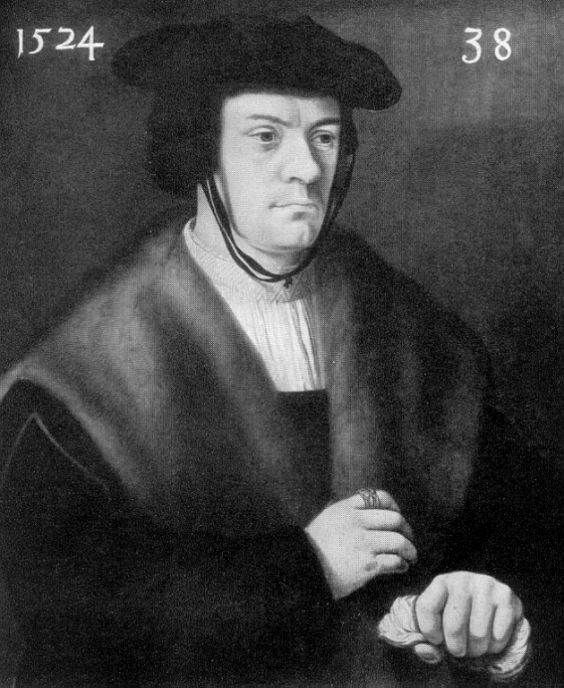
  Portrait of Agrippa

Rabanus also, a famous Doctor, composed an excellent book of the vertues of numbers: But now how great vertues numbers have in nature, is manifest in the hearb which is called Cinquefoil, i.e. five leaved Grass; for this resists poysons by vertue of the number of five; also drives away divells, conduceth to expiation; and one leafe of it taken twice in a day in wine, cures the Feaver of one day: three the tertian Feaver: foure the quartane. In like manner four grains of the seed of Turnisole being drunk, cures the quartane, but three the tertian. In like manner Vervin is said to cure Feavers, being drunk in wine, if in tertians it be cut from the third joynt, in quartans from the fourth.

- A spurious Fourth book of occult philosophy, sometimes called Of Magical Ceremonies, has also been attributed to him; this book first appeared in Marburg in 1559 and is not believed to have been written by Agrippa.

=== Modern editions ===
De occulta philosophia libri tres

- Compagni, Vittoria Perrone, ed. (1992). De occulta philosophia libri tres (in Latin). Leiden and Boston: Brill. ISBN 90-04-09421-0.
- De Laurence, L. W., ed. (1913). The Philosophy of Natural Magic. Translated by James Freake. Chicago, Ill.: The de Laurence Company. Book one only.
- Shepherd, Leslie, ed. (1974). The Philosophy of Natural Magic. Translated by James Freake. University Books. ISBN 0-82160-218-7. Book one only.
- Tyson, Donald, ed. (2005). Three Books of Occult Philosophy. Translated by James Freake. Llewelyn Worldwide. ISBN 0-87542-832-0.
- Purdue, Eric (2021). Three Books of Occult Philosophy. Translated by Purdue. Inner Traditions. ISBN 978-1644114162.

Other works

- Dunn, Catherine M., ed. (1974). Of the Vanitie and Vncertaintie of Artes and Sciences. Translated by James Sanford. Northridge, CA: California State University Foundation. ASIN B0006CM0SW.
- Matton, Sylvain, ed. (2014). De Arte Chimica [On Alchemy]. Translated by Sylvain Matton. Paris: SÉHA. ISBN 978-88-7252-337-7.
- Rabil, Albert Jr., ed. (1996). Declamation on the Nobility and Preeminence of the Female Sex. Translated by Albert Rabil Jr. Chicago: University of Chicago Press. ISBN 0-226-01059-7.
- Warwick, Tarl, ed. (2016). Female Preeminence: An Ingenius Discourse. Translated by H. C. CreateSpace Independent Publishing Platform. ISBN 978-1-53532-532-5.

== In popular culture ==
Agrippa appears in the Harry Potter fantasy series on a Chocolate Frog trading card when Ron Weasley tells Harry that he is missing that particular card.

Agrippa also appears as deuteragonist in the horror video game Amnesia: The Dark Descent. The player is able to frequently interact with him, and he helps the player achieve one of the four endings of the game.

== See also ==
- Celestial Alphabet – Occult alphabet
- Renaissance magic – Magical science during the Renaissance
