= List of demons in the Ars Goetia =

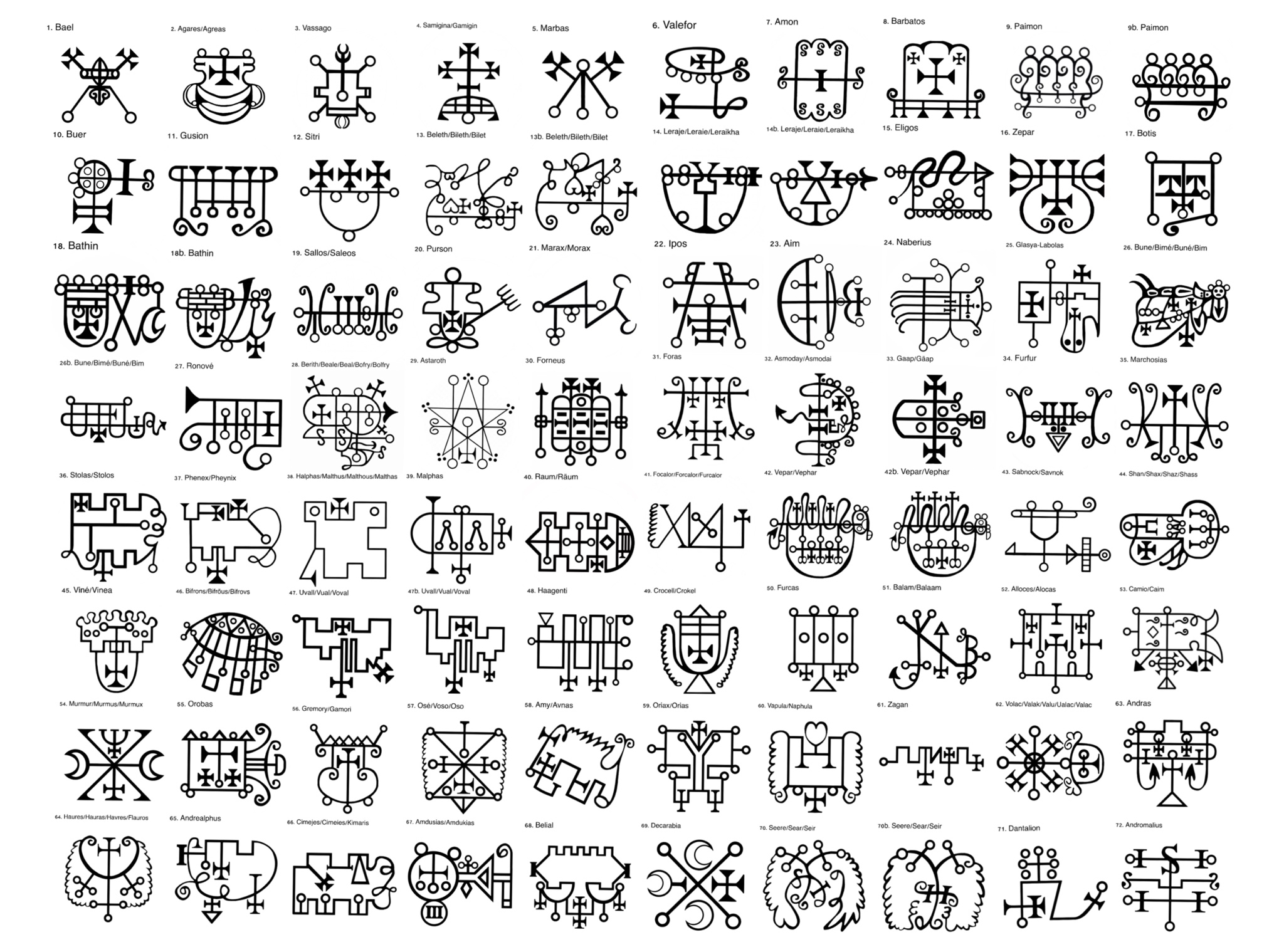
The 72 sigils

In this article, the demons' names are taken from the goetic grimoire Ars Goetia, which differs in terms of number and ranking from the Pseudomonarchia Daemonum of Johannes Wier. As a result of multiple translations, there are multiple spellings for some of the names, explained in more detail in the articles concerning them.

Each ranking represents association with one of the local astrological bodies; Kings with the Sun, Marquises with the Moon, Presidents with Mercury, Dukes with Venus, Earls with Mars, Princes with Jupiter, and the sole Knight with Saturn. The sole demon which appears in the Pseudomonarchia Daemonum but not in the Ars Goetia is Pruflas.

The 72 angels of the Shem HaMephorash are considered to be the opposite and balancing forces against these fallen angels.

== Kings ==
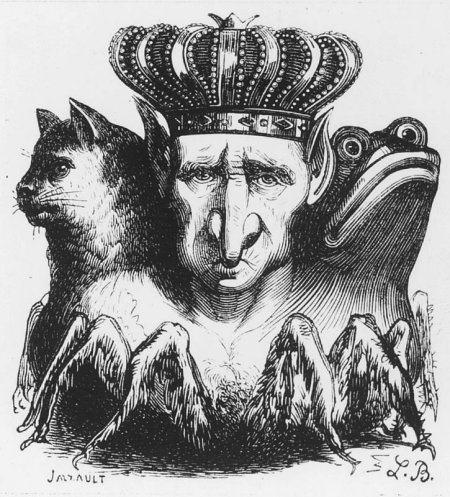
Bael as depicted in Collin de Plancy's Dictionnaire Infernal.

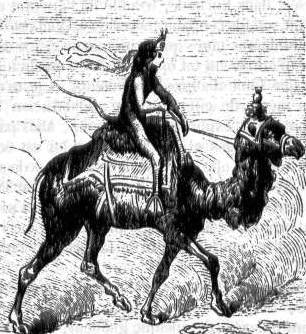
Paimon as depicted in Collin de Plancy's Dictionnaire Infernal.

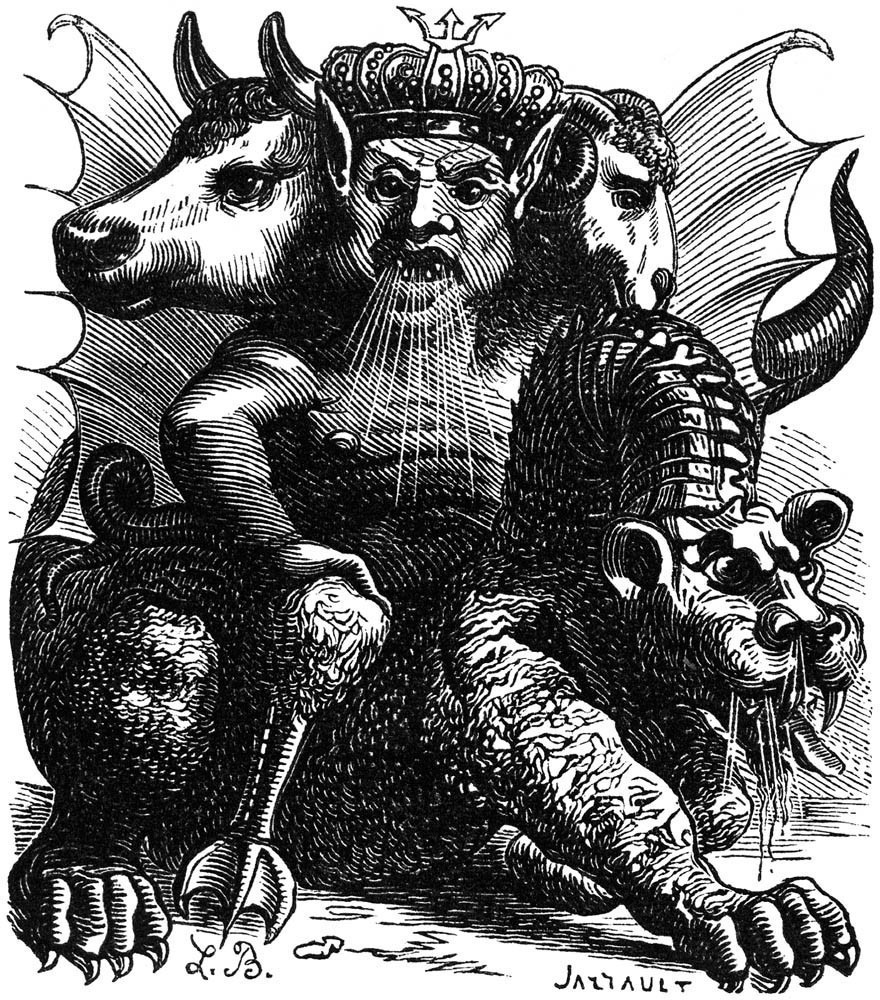
Asmodeus as depicted in Collin de Plancy's Dictionnaire Infernal.

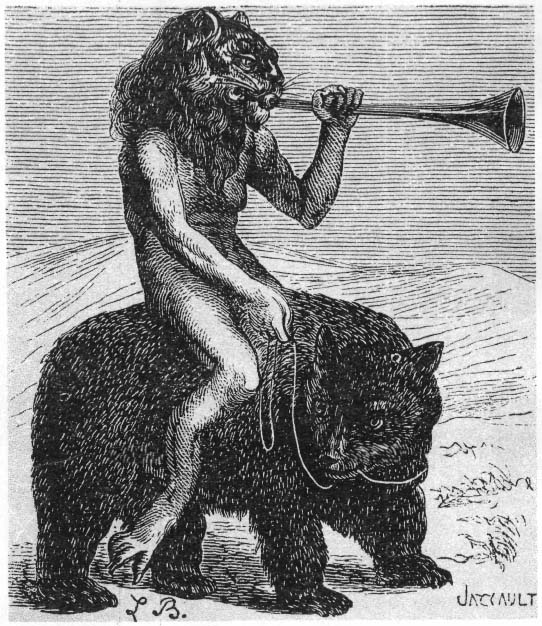
Purson's image in Mathers's The Goetia corresponds to Pruflas's illustration from the Dictionnaire Infernal.

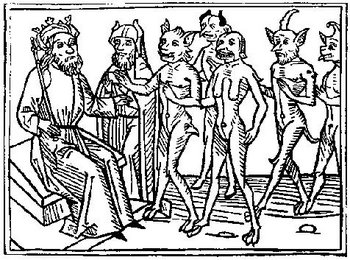
A woodcarving of Belial and some of his followers from Jacobus de Teramo's book Buche Belial (1473).

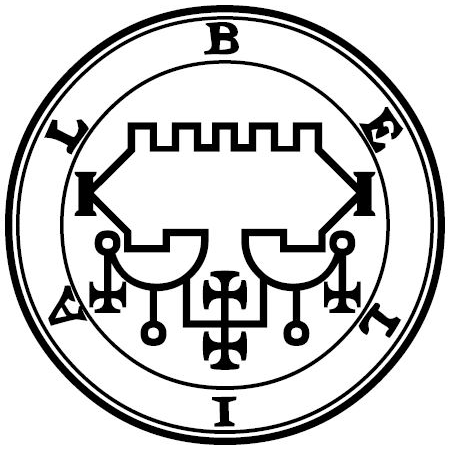
Belial's seal as depicted in the Ars Goetia.

1. According to The Grand Grimoire, Bael (or Baal, Ba'al, Baell, Buel, Baël) is the head of the infernal powers. He is also the first demon listed in Wierus's Pseudomonarchia Daemonum. According to Wierus, Bael is the first King of Hell with estates in the east. He has three heads; the first is that of a toad, the second like a man, and the third like a cat. He also speaks in a raucous, but well-formed voice, and commands 66 legions. Bael teaches the art of invisibility, and may be the equivalent of Baalzebub, one of the Seven princes of Hell.
2. Paimon (also Paimonia, Paymon, Paymonia, Païmon, Bayemont, Baymon, Bayemon) is one of the Kings of Hell, more obedient to Lucifer than the other kings are, and has 200 legions of demons under his command. He has a great voice and roars as soon as he comes, speaking in this manner for a while until the conjurer compels him, and then he answers clearly the questions he is asked. When a conjurer invokes this demon, they must look towards the northwest, the direction of Paimon's house, and when Paimon appears, he must be allowed to ask the conjurer what they wish and be answered, in order to obtain the same from him.
  1. Paimon teaches all arts, philosophies, and sciences, and secret things; he can reveal all mysteries of the Earth, wind, and water, what the mind is, and where it is, and everything the conjurer wants to know. He gives good familiars, dignities and confirms them, and binds men to the conjurer's will.
  2. If Paimon is cited alone, buffering or sacrifice must be done, and he will accept it, though the precise nature of the gift is unclear; then two kings called Beball (Bebal or Labal) and Abalam (Abalim) will go to him together with other spirits, often twenty-five legions; but these other spirits do not always come unless the conjurer calls upon them.
  3. Paimon is depicted as a man with an effeminate face, wearing a precious crown, and riding a dromedary. Before him often goes a host of demons with the shape of men, playing trumpets, cymbals, and any other types of musical instruments.
3. Beleth (also Bilet, Bileth, Byleth, Bilith) is a mighty and terrible King of Hell, having 85 legions of demons under his command. He rides a warhorse, and all kind of music is heard before him, according to most authors on demonology and the most known grimoires. According to Pseudomonarchia Daemonum, Ham, son of Noah, was the first in invoking him after the flood, and wrote a book on mathematics with his help.
  1. When appearing, he looks very fierce to frighten the conjurer or to see if they are courageous. The conjurer must be brave, and holding a hazel wand in their hand must draw a triangle by striking towards the South, East, and upwards, and command Beleth into it by means of some conjurations.
  2. If he does not obey, the conjurer must rehearse all threats the conjurations said. Then, Beleth will obey and do all that he is commanded, but the conjurer must be respectful and pay homage unto Beleth due to his rank, and hold a silver ring in the middle finger of the left hand against his face, as it is the use of hellish kings and princes before Amaymon.
  3. Beleth gives all the love of men and women he is commanded until the conjurer is satisfied.
4. Purson (also Curson, Pursan) is a Great King of Hell, being served and obeyed by 22 legions of demons. He knows of hidden things, can find treasures, and tells all things past, present and future. Taking a human or aerial body, he answers truly of all secret and divine things of Earth and the creation of the world. He also brings good familiars. Purson is depicted as a man with the face of a lion, carrying a ferocious viper in his hand, and riding a bear. Before him, there can be heard many trumpets sounding. This demon blows internal trumpets, and is believed connected to the revelator to the Antichrist. According to Fritz Springmeier, End times programming also involves (because of the ushering in of the reign of the anti-christ) demonology involved -- the Demon "Purson" involved with the programming. His job is the Revelator of the anti-christ. He will know a victim’s system.
5. Asmodeus (also Ashmodai, Ashmedai, Asmoday, Asmodai) appears as the King 'Asmoday' in the Ars Goetia, where he is said to have a seal in gold and is listed as number thirty-two according to respective rank. He "is strong, powerful and appears with three heads; the first is like a bull, the second like a man, and the third like a ram or a goat; the tail of a serpent, and from his mouth issue flames of fire." Also, he sits upon an infernal dragon, holds a lance with a banner, and amongst the legions of Amaymon, Asmoday governs 72 legions of inferior spirits.
6. (King/Count) Vine (also Viné, Vinea) is a King and Earl of Hell, commanding 36 legions of demons. He can tell all things present, past, and future, discover witches and hidden things, create storms and make the water rough by means of them, and also bring down walls and build towers. Vine is portrayed as a lion holding a snake in his hand and riding a black horse. The etymology of his name seems to be the Latin word 'vinea', vine, that is also the name given to an ancient war machine made of wood and covered with leather and branches, used to overthrow walls.
7. Balam (also Balaam, Balan) is a great and powerful King of Hell, commanding 40 legions of demons. He gives perfect answers on all things past, present, and future, and can also make men invisible and witty. Balam is depicted as being three-headed. One head is the head of a bull, the second of a man, and the third of a ram. He has flaming eyes and the tail of a serpent. He carries a hawk on his fist and rides a strong bear. At other times, he is represented as a naked man riding a bear. His name seems to have been taken from Balaam, the biblical magician.
8. (King/President) Zagan (also Zelban, Zelba) is a Great King and President of Hell, commanding 33 legions of demons. He makes men witty; he can also turn wine into water, water into wine, and blood into wine (According to the Pseudomonarchia Daemonum, he can also turn blood into oil, oil into blood, and a fool into a wise man). Zelba is the treasurer of Hell. In exchange for large monetary offerings, Zelba grants unusual, special powers. Other of his powers is that of turning metals into coins that are made with that metal (i.e., gold into a gold coin, copper into a copper coin, etc.). is depicted as a griffin-winged bull that turns into a man after a while.
9. Belial (also Belhor, Baalial, Beliar, Beliall, Beliel, Belias) is listed as the 68th spirit of The Lesser Key of Solomon. He is a King of Hell with 80 legions of demons and 50 legions of spirits under his command. He was created as the first, after Lucifer. He has the power to distribute senatorships and gives excellent familiars. He must be presented with offerings, sacrifices, and gifts, or else he will not give true answers to demands.

== Dukes ==
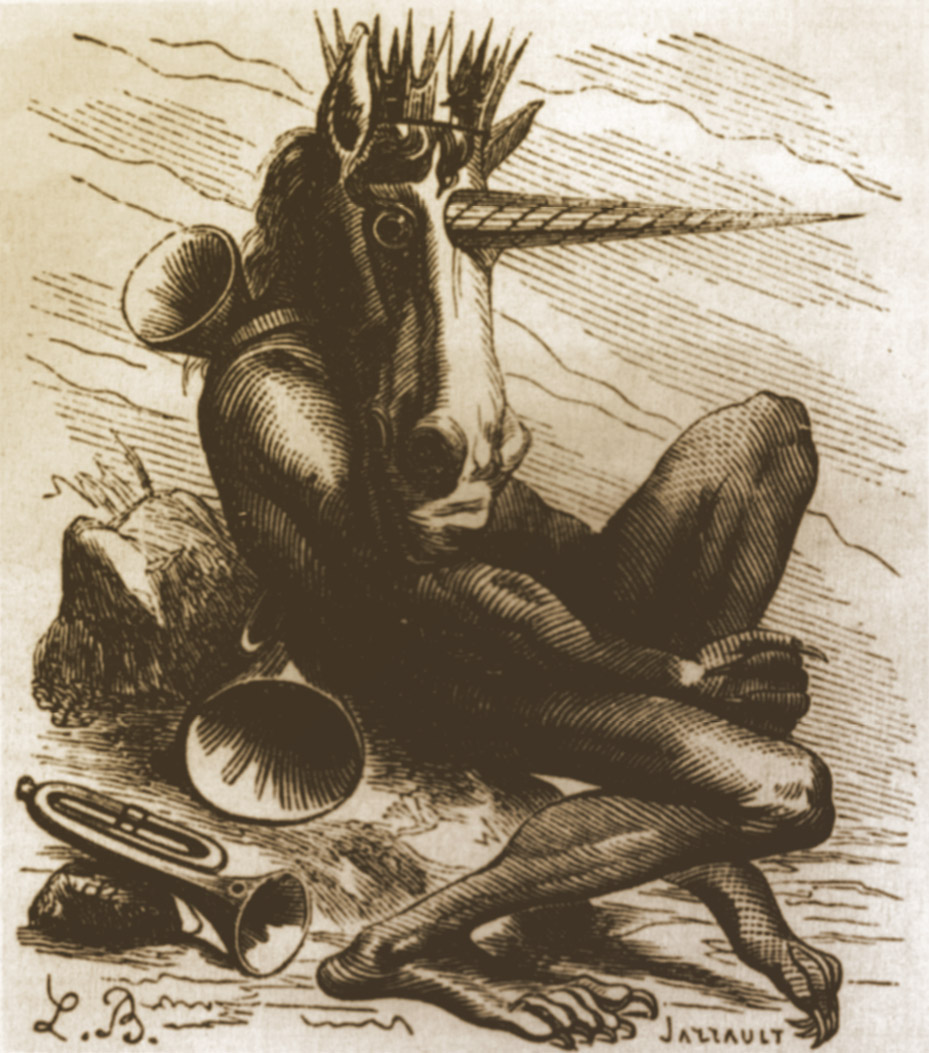
Amdusias

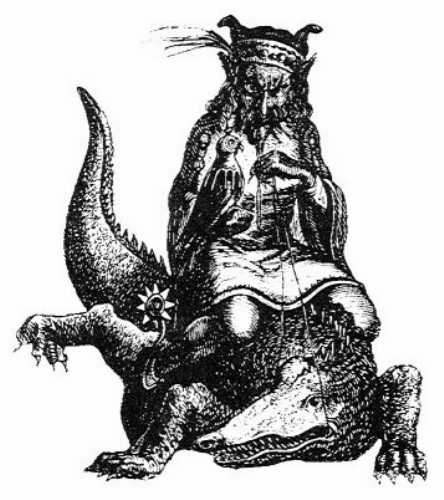
Agares' illustration from Collin de Plancy's Dictionnaire Infernal.

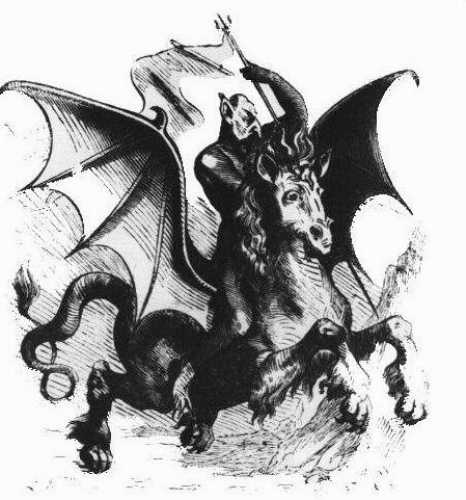
Eligos' illustration from Collin de Plancy's Dictionnaire Infernal.

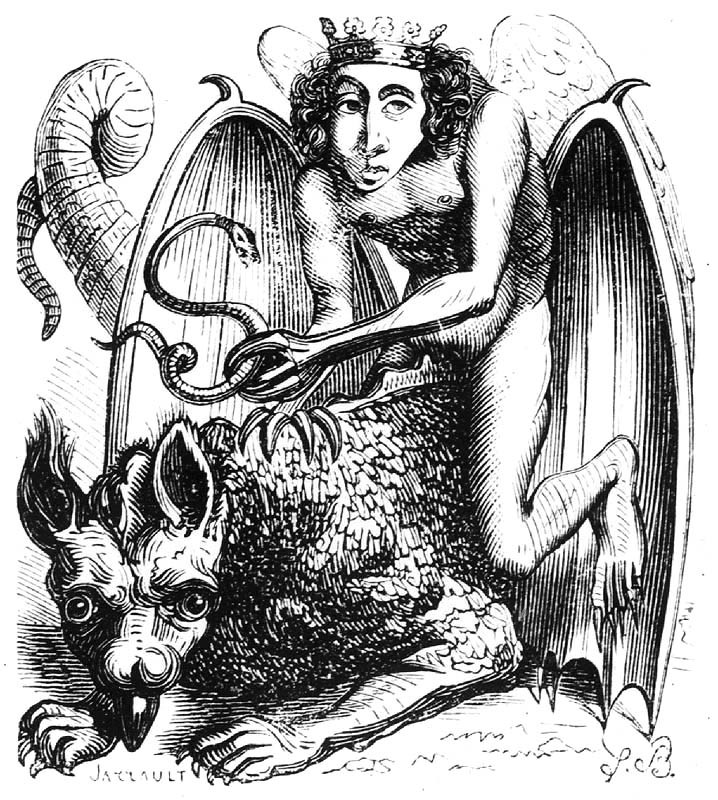
Astaroth's illustration from Collin de Plancy's Dictionnaire Infernal.

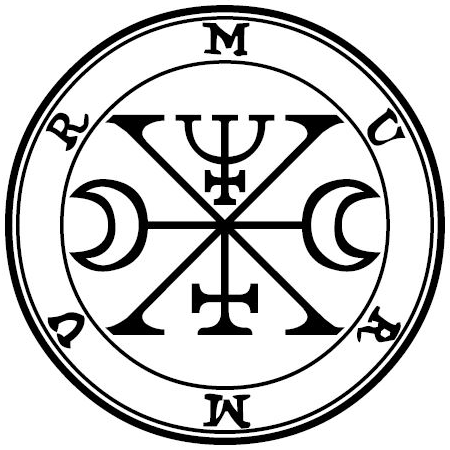
Murmur's seal from the Ars Goetia.

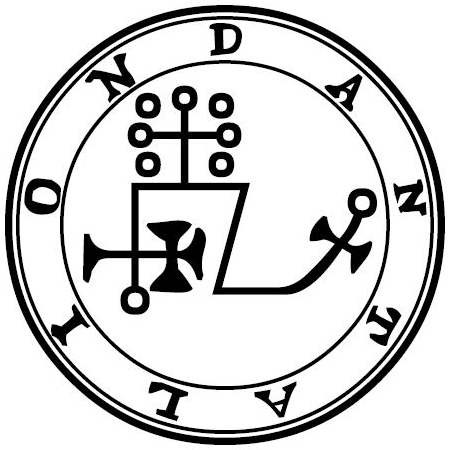
Dantalion's seal from the Ars Goetia.
1. Amdusias (also Amduscias, Amdukias, Ambduscias) is a Duke of Hell, having 29 legions of demons and spirits under his command. He is depicted as a human with clawed hands and feet, the head of a unicorn, and a trumpet to symbolize his powerful voice. Amdusias is associated with thunder, and it has been said that his voice is heard during storms. In other sources, he is accompanied by the sound of trumpets when he comes, and will give concerts if commanded, but while all his types of musical instruments can be heard, they cannot be seen. He is regarded as being the demon in charge of the cacophonous music that is played in Hell. He can also make trees bend at will.
2. Agares (also Agreas, Agarus, Agarat, Aguarès) is a Duke of Hell, ruling the eastern zone of Hell and being served by 31 legions of demons. He can make runaways come back and those who stand still run, finding pleasure in teaching immoral expressions. He also has the power to destroy dignities, both temporal and supernatural. He is depicted as a pale old man riding a crocodile.
3. Valefar (also Malaphar, Malephar, Valafar, Valefor) is a Duke of Hell, commanding 10 legions of demons. He tempts people to steal and is in charge of a good relationship among thieves. Valefar is considered a good familiar by his associates "till they are caught in the trap." He is represented as a lion with the head of a man, or as a lion with the head of a donkey.
4. (Duke/Count) Barbatos is a Duke and Earl of Hell, ruling 30 legions of demons and has four kings as his companions to command his legions. He gives the understanding of the voices of the animals, says past and future, conciliates friends and rulers, and he can lead men to hidden treasures that have been hidden by the enchantment of magicians. His name seems to derive from Latin "barbatus", bearded, old man, philosopher.
5. Gusion (also Gusoin, Gusoyn, Augusyon) is a strong Great Duke of Hell, ruling over 40 legions of demons. He tells all things past, present and future things, shows the meaning of all questions that are asked to him, reconciles friends, and gives honour and dignity. He is depicted as a baboon or according to some, in the form of a "Xenopilus."
6. Eligos (also Abigor, Eligor) is a Great Duke of Hell, ruling 60 legions of demons. He discovers hidden things and knows the future of wars and how soldiers should meet. He also attracts the favor of lords, knights and other important persons. He is depicted in the form of a goodly knight carrying a lance, an ensign, and a serpent.
7. Zepar is a Great Duke of Hell, commanding 26 legions of inferior spirits. His office is to cause women to love men, and bring them together in love. He makes women barren. He is depicted with red clothes and armor, like a soldier.
8. Bathin (also Bathym, Mathim, Marthim) is a Duke (Great Duke according to Pseudomonarchia Daemonum) of Hell, who has under his command 30 legions of demons. He knows the virtues of precious stones and herbs, and can bring men suddenly from one country to another. He helps one attain astral projection, and takes you wherever you want to go. He is depicted as a strong man with the tail of a serpent, riding a pale horse.
9. Saleos (also Sallos, Zaleos) is a mighty Great Duke (a Great Earl according to Johann Weyer) of Hell, ruling 30 legions of demons, although Weyer does not mention anything concerning legions under his command. He is of a pacifist nature, and causes men to love women and women to love men. He is depicted as a gallant and handsome soldier, wearing a ducal crown, and riding a crocodile.
10. Aim (also Aym, Haborym) is a very strong Great Duke of Hell, ruling over 26 legions of demons. He sets cities, castles and great places on fire, makes men witty in all ways, and gives true answers concerning private matters. He is depicted as a man (handsome to some sources), but with three heads, one of a serpent, the second of a man, and the third of a cat to most authors, although some say of a calf, riding a viper, and carrying in his hand a lit firebrand with which he sets the requested things on fire.
11. Buné is a mighty and strong Great Duke of Hell, having 30 legions of demons under his command. He changes the place of the dead and makes them demons that are under his power to gather together upon those sepulchres. Buné makes men eloquent and wise, and gives true answers to their demands and also richness. He speaks with a comely high voice. Buné is depicted as a three-headed dragon, being his heads like those of a dog, a griffin, and a man (although according to some grimoires he has two heads like a dragon and the third like a man).
12. Berith (also Baal-berith, Baal Berith, Ba'al Berith, El Berith) is a powerful and terrible Great Duke of Hell, having 26 legions of demons under his command. He tells things of the past, present and future with true answers; he can also turn all metals into gold, give dignities to men and confirm them. He speaks with a clear and subtle voice, and as recounted in Aleister Crowley's Illustrated Goetia, he is a liar when not answering questions. To speak with him the conjurer must wear a silver ring and put it before his face in the same form as it is needed in Beleth's case and demons do before Amaymon. He is depicted as a soldier wearing red clothes, a golden crown, and riding a red horse. Books on the subject tell that he is called according to whom invokes him, being called Berith by the Jews (see below). According to some demonologists from the 16th century, his power is stronger in June, meanwhile to Sebastien Michaelis, he suggests murder and blasphemy, and his adversary is St. Barnabas. His name was surely taken from Ba'al Berith, a form of Baal worshiped in Berith (Beirut), Phoenicia. In alchemy, Berith was the element with which all metals could be transmuted into gold. "Berith" is the Hebrew word for covenant, it was originated from the Akkadian (Babylonian) word "Biritu" which means "to fetter" or "to bond".
13. Astaroth (also Ashtaroth, Astarot, Asteroth, Astetoth) is referred to in The Lesser Key of Solomon as a very powerful Great Duke of Hell who commands 40 legions of demons.
  Astaroth's seal as depicted in the Ars Goetia.
  In art, in the Dictionnaire Infernal, Astaroth is depicted as a nude man with feathered wings, wearing a crown, holding a serpent in one hand, and riding a beast with dragon-like wings and a serpent-like tail. According to Sebastien Michaelis, he is a demon of the First Hierarchy, who seduces by means of laziness, vanity, and rationalized philosophies. His adversary is St. Bartholomew, who can protect against him, for he has resisted Astaroth's temptations. To others, he teaches mathematical sciences and handicrafts, can make men invisible and lead them to hidden treasures, and answers every question formulated to him. He was also said to grant mortal beings the power over serpents. His name is possibly taken from the goddess Asherah or Astarte.
14. Focalor (also Forcalor, Furcalor; not to be confused with Focalors, a character in Genshin Impact) is a powerful Great Duke of Hell, commanding 30 legions of demons. Focalor is mentioned in The Lesser Key of Solomon as the 41st of the 72 goetic demons. According to the grimoire, Focalor appears in the form of a man with a griffin's wings, kills men, drowns them, and overthrows warships, but if commanded by the conjurer, he will not harm any man or thing. According to the "Treatise on Demonology Summa verborum, temporis, numeri et spatii", kept at the in Florence Uffizi (Italy), he is a Grand General of Hell who appears in human form—with the wings of a griffin—only when he kills people of the bourgeois class. Focalor has power over the winds and seas, and had hoped to return to heaven after 1,000 years, but he was deceived in his hope.
15. Vepar (also Separ, Vephar) is a strong Great Duke of Hell, ruling over 29 legions of demons. He governs the waters and guides armoured ships laden with ammunition and weapons. He can also make, if requested, the sea rough and stormy, and to appear full of ships. Vepar can also make men die in three days by putrefying sores and wounds, causing worms to breed in them, but if requested by the conjurer, he can and will heal them immediately. Vepar is depicted as a two-tailed mermaid.
16. Vual (also Uvall, Voval, Vreal, Wal, Wall) is a mighty Great Duke of Hell, commanding 37 legions of demons. He gives the love of women, causes friendship between friends and foes, and tells things past, present and to come. Vual is depicted as a dromedary that after a while changes shape into a man, and speaks the Egyptian language, but not perfectly, with a deep voice.
17. Crocell (also Crokel, Procell) is the 49th spirit of the Ars Goetia, manifesting as an angel with a tendency to speak in dark and mysterious ways. Once a member of the Powers, he is now a Duke of Hell who rules over 48 legions of demons. When summoned by a conjuror, he can teach geometry and other liberal sciences. He can also warm bodies of water, create the illusion of the sound of rushing waters, and reveal the location of natural baths.
18. Allocer (also Alocer, Alloces) is a Great Duke of Hell, having 36 legions of demons under his command. He induces people to immorality and teaches arts and all mysteries of the sky. He is described by Johann Weyer as appearing in the shape of a knight mounted on an enormous horse. His face has leonine characteristics; he has a ruddy complexion and burning eyes; and he speaks with much gravity. He is said to provide good familiars, and to teach astronomy and liberal arts. Allocer is often depicted riding a horse with dragon legs.
19. (Duke/Count) Murmur (also Murmus, Murmuur, Murmux) is a Great Duke and Earl of Hell, having 30 legions of demons under his command. He teaches philosophy, and can oblige the souls of the deceased to appear before the conjurer to answer every desired question. Murmur is depicted as a soldier riding a vulture or a griffin, and wearing a ducal crown. Two of his ministers go before him making the sound of trumpets. "Murmur" in Latin means noise, whisper, murmur, and the sound of the trumpet.
20. Gemory (also Gamory, Gremory, Gomory, Gamori, Gaeneron, Gemon, Gemyem) is a strong Duke of Hell, governing 26 legions of demons. He tells all things past, present and future, about hidden treasures, and procures the love of women, young and old, but especially maidens. He is depicted as appearing in the form of a beautiful woman with the crown of a duchess tied around her waist, and riding a camel.
21. Vapula (also Naphula) is a powerful Great Duke of Hell, commanding 36 legions of demons. His office is to make men knowing in all handicrafts and professions. He teaches philosophy, mechanics, and sciences. Vapula is depicted as a griffin-winged lion.
22. Flauros (also Flavros, Hauras, Haures, Havres) is a strong Great Duke of Hell, having 36 (20 according to Pseudomonarchia Daemonum) legions of demons under his rule. He gives true answers of all things past, present and future, but he must be first commanded to enter a magic triangle for if not he will lie, deceive the conjurer, and beguile him in other business. But if he enters the triangle he will answer truly, and gladly speak about divinity, the creation of the world, himself, and other fallen angels. He can also destroy all the conjurer's enemies by burning them up. If the magician requests it, he will not suffer temptations from any spirit or in any form. He is commonly described as a humanoid leopard with large claws. Flauros is depicted as a terrible and strong leopard that under request of the conjurer changes into a man with fiery eyes and an awful expression. Flauros can also supposedly be called upon when a mortal wishes to take vengeance on other demons. This is likely included in his capability to destroy the conjurer's enemies.
23. Dantalion (also Dantalian) is a powerful Great Duke of Hell, having 36 legions of demons under his command; he is the 71st of the 72 spirits of Solomon. He teaches all arts and sciences, and also declares the secret counsel of anyone, given that he knows the thoughts of all people and can change them at his will. He can also cause love and show the similitude of any person, show the same by means of a vision, and let them be in any part of the world they will. He is depicted as a man with many appearances, which means he has the faces of all men and women. There are also many depictions in which he is said to hold a book in one of his hands. The Lesser Key of Solomon describes him as follows:
  The Seventy-first Spirit is Dantalion. He is a Duke Great and Mighty, appearing in the Form of a Man with many Countenances, all Men's and Women's Faces; and he hath a Book in his right hand. His Office is to teach all Arts and Sciences unto any; and to declare the Secret Counsel of any one; for he knoweth the Thoughts of all Men and Women, and can change them at his Will. He can cause Love, and show the Similitude of any person, and show the same by a Vision, let them be in what part of the World they Will. He governeth 36 Legions of Spirits; and this is his Seal, which wear thou, etc.

== Princes ==
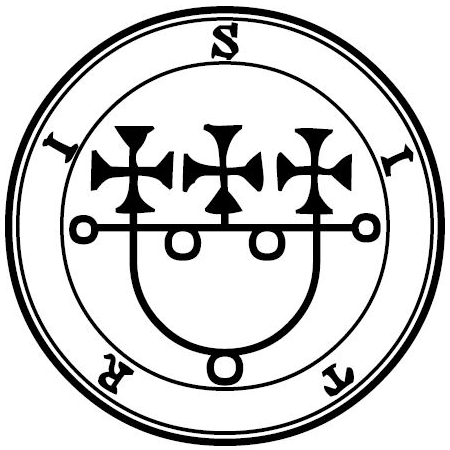
Sytry's seal as depicted in the Ars Goetia.

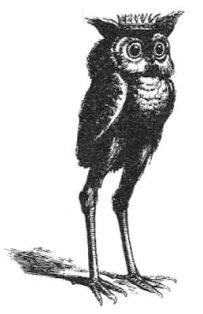
Stolas as illustrated in Collin de Plancy's Dictionnaire Infernal.

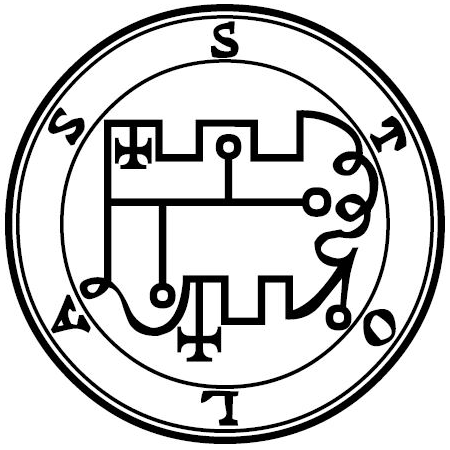
Stolas's seal as depicted in the Ars Goetia.

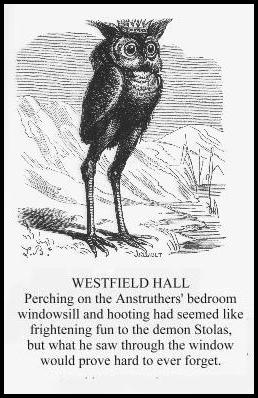
A description of the demon Stolas, illustrated by Louis Le Breton.

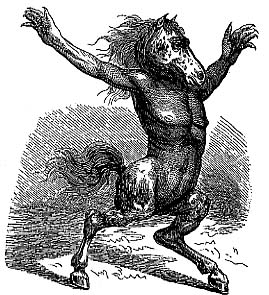
An early woodcut image of Orobas.

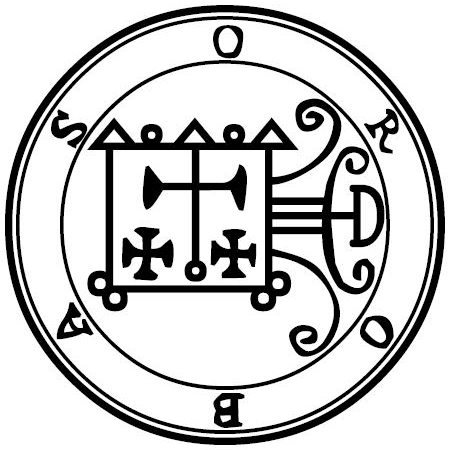
Orobas's seal as depicted in the Ars Goetia.
1. Vassago (also Vasago, Usagoo) is a mighty Prince of Hell (see Hierarchy of demons), ruling over 26 legions of demons. He can be persuaded to tell the magician of events past and future, can discover hidden and lost things, and has a "good" nature. A partial description from The Lesser Key of Solomon is as follows: "The Third Spirit is a Mighty Prince, being of the same nature as Agares. He is called Vassago. This Spirit is of a Good Nature, and his office is to declare things Past and to Come, and to discover all things Hidden or Lost." According to the Liber Officium Spirituum, he manifests as an angel.
2. Sitri (also Bitru, Sytry, Sytri) is a Great Prince of Hell, and reigns over 60 legions of demons. He causes men to love women and vice versa, and can make people bare themselves naked if desired. He is depicted with the face of a leopard and the wings of a griffin, but under the conjurer's request he changes into a very beautiful man.
3. (Prince/Count) Ipos (also Aiperos, Ayperos, Ayporos, Ipes) is a Prince and powerful Earl of Hell (a Duke to some authors), having 36 legions of demons under his command. He knows and can reveal all things past, present, and future. He can make men witty and valiant. He is commonly depicted with the body of an angel with the head of a lion, the tail of a hare, and the feet of a goose, less frequently in the same shape but with the body of a lion, and rarely as a vulture.
4. (Prince/President) Gaap (also Goap, Tap, Taob, Coap) is a mighty Prince and Great President of Hell, commanding 66 legions of demons. He is, according to The Lesser Key of Solomon, the king and prince of the southern region of Hell and Earth, and according to the Pseudomonarchia Daemonum, the king of the western region and as mighty as Beleth, but for both he is the guide of the four kings (the others being Ziminiar, Corson and Amaymon, although some translations of The Lesser Key of Solomon consider Belial, Beleth, Asmodai and Gaap, not giving detail on the cardinal point they rule). He is said to be better conjured to appear when the Sun is in a southern zodiacal sign. Gaap teaches Philosophy and all liberal sciences, can cause love or hate and make men insensible and invisible, deliver familiars out of the custody of other magicians, teaches how to consecrate those things that belong to the dominion of Amaymon his king (there is a contradiction here, see above), gives true answers concerning past, present and future, and can carry and re-carry men and things speedily from one nation to another at the conjurer's will. According to a few authors he can make men ignorant. According to Pseudomonarchia Daemonum, certain necromancers honour him with sacrifices and burning offerings. He is depicted in human shape.
5. Stolas (also Stolos, Stoppas, Solas) is a Great Prince of Hell, commanding 26 legions of demons. He teaches astronomy and is knowledgeable about herbs, plants, and precious stones. He is often depicted as a raven or a crowned owl with long legs.
6. Orobas is a very powerful Great Prince of Hell, having 20 legions of demons under his control. He supposedly gives true answers of things past, present and to come, divinity, and the creation of the world; he also confers dignities and prelacies, and the favour of friends and foes. Orobas is faithful to the conjurer, does not permit that any spirit tempts him, and never deceives anyone. He is depicted as a horse that changes into a man under the conjurer's request. The name could come from Latin "orobias", a type of incense.
7. Seir (also Seire, Seere, Sear) is a Prince of Hell, having 26 legions of demons under his command. He can go to any place on earth in a matter of seconds to accomplish the will of the conjurer, bring abundance, help in finding hidden treasures or in robbery, and is not a demon of evil but good nature, being mostly indifferent to evilness. He is depicted as a man riding a winged horse, and he is said to be beautiful.

== Marquises ==
1. Gamigin (also Gamygin, Gamigm, Samigina, Gamygyn) is a Great Marquis of Hell, ruling over 30 legions of demons. He teaches all liberal sciences and gives an account of the souls of those who died in sin and who drowned in the sea, speaking with a rough voice. He also answers what is asked about, and stays with the conjurer until they are satisfied. Gamigin is depicted as a little horse or a donkey, which changes form into a man under the conjurer's request.
2. Aamon (also Amon, Nahum) is a Marquis of Hell, governing 40 infernal legions. He appears as a wolf with a serpent's tail who can breathe fire, or as a man with a raven's head, sometimes depicted with canine teeth. He tells of all things past and future. He procures feuds, and reconciles controversies between friends and foes.
3. Leraje (also Leraie, Leraikha, Leraye, Loray, Oray) is a mighty Great Marquis of Hell, having 30 legions of demons under his power. He causes great battles and disputes, and makes gangrenous wounds caused by arrows. He is depicted as a gallant and handsome archer clad in green, carrying a bow and quiver.
4. The demon Naberius (also Naberus, Nebiros, Cerberus, Cerbere) was first mentioned by Johannes Wier in 1583. He is supposedly the most valiant Marquis of Hell, and has 19 legions of demons under his command. He makes men cunning in all arts, but especially in rhetoric, speaking with a hoarse voice. He also restores lost dignities and honors, although to Johann Weyer he procures the loss of them. Naberius appears as a three-headed dog or a raven. He has a raucous voice but presents himself as eloquent and amiable. He teaches the art of gracious living. He is depicted as a crow or a black crane. Concerning his name, it is unclear if there is an association with the Greek Cerberus. It is said that in 1583, Johann Weyer considers both of them to be the same demon. He claimed "Naberius [Naberus], alias Cerberus, is a valiant marquesse, shewing himselfe in the forme of a crowe, when he speaketh with a hoarse voice: he maketh a man amiable and cunning in all arts, and speciallie in rhetorike, he procureth the losse of prelacies and dignities: nineteene legions heare (and obeie) him."
5. (Marquis/Count) Ronové (also Ronove, Roneve, Ronwe, Ronoweh) is a Marquis and Great Earl of Hell, commanding 19 legions of demons. He teaches rhetoric, languages, and gives good and loyal servants and the favour of friends and foes. He is described as a monster holding a staff, without detailing his appearance.
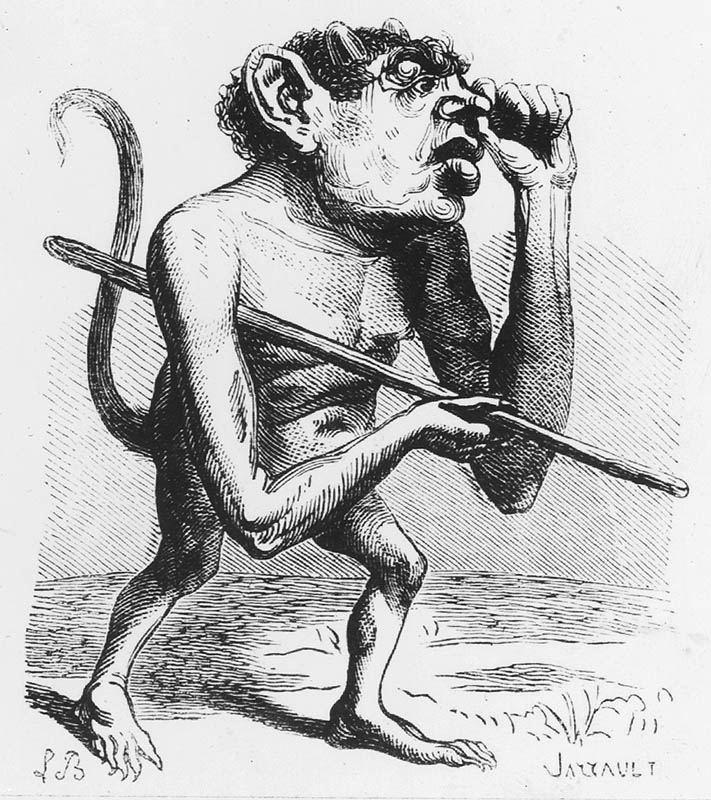
  Illustration of Ronové from Collin de Plancy's Dictionnaire Infernal.
  He is also described as a taker of old souls, often coming to earth to harvest souls of decrepit humans and animals that are near death.
6. Forneus is a Great Marquis of Hell, having 29 legions of demons under his command. He teaches rhetoric and languages, gives men a good name, and makes them be loved by their friends and foes, as well as causing them to have the knowledge and understanding of tongues. He is depicted as a great sea monster. His name seems to come from Latin "fornus", "furnus": "oven".
7. Marchosias (also Marchocias) is a powerful Great Marquis of Hell, commanding 30 legions of demons. He is a strong and excellent fighter and very reliable to the conjurer, giving true answers to all questions. Marchosias hoped after 1,200 years to return to heaven with the non-fallen angels, but he is deceived in that hope. He is depicted as a wolf with a man's form as well as a griffin's wings and a serpent's tail, that under request changes shape into a man. The name Marchosias comes from Late Latin marchio, "marquis".
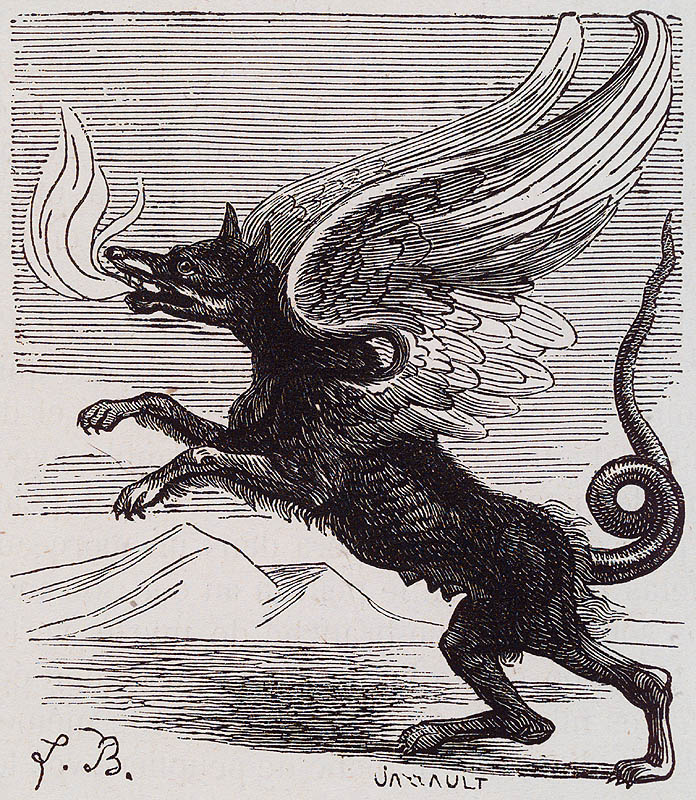
  Illustration of Marchosias from Collin de Plancy's Dictionnaire Infernal.
8. Phenex (also Pheynix, Phoenix, Phoeniex) is a Great Marquis of Hell, having 20 legions of demons under his command. He teaches all wonderful sciences, is an excellent poet, and is very obedient to the conjuror. Phenex hopes to return to Heaven after 1,200 years, but he is deceived in this hope. He is depicted as a phoenix which sings sweet notes with the voice of a child, but the conjurer must warn his companions (for he has not to be alone) not to hear them and ask him to put in human shape, which the demon supposedly does after a certain amount of time. Johann Weyer's Pseudomonarchia Daemonum describes this spirit as follows: "Phoenix is a great marquesse, appearing like the bird Phoenix, having a child's voice: but before he standeth still before the conjuror, he singeth manie sweet notes. Then the exorcist with his companions must beware he give no eare to the melodie, but must by and by bid him put on humane shape; then will he speake marvelous of all wonderfull sciences. He is an excellent poet, and obedient, he hopeth to returne to the seventh throne after a thousand two hundredth yeares, and governeth twentie legions."
9. Sabnock (also Sab Nac, Sabnac, Sabnach, Sabnack, Sabnacke, Salmac, and Savnock) is a mighty Great Marquis of Hell, having 50 legions of demons under his command. He builds high towers, castles and cities, furnishing them with weapons, ammunition, etc., gives good familiars, and can afflict men for several days making their wounds and sores gangrenous or filling them with worms. Sabnock is depicted as a soldier with armor and weapons, the head of a lion, and riding a pale horse.
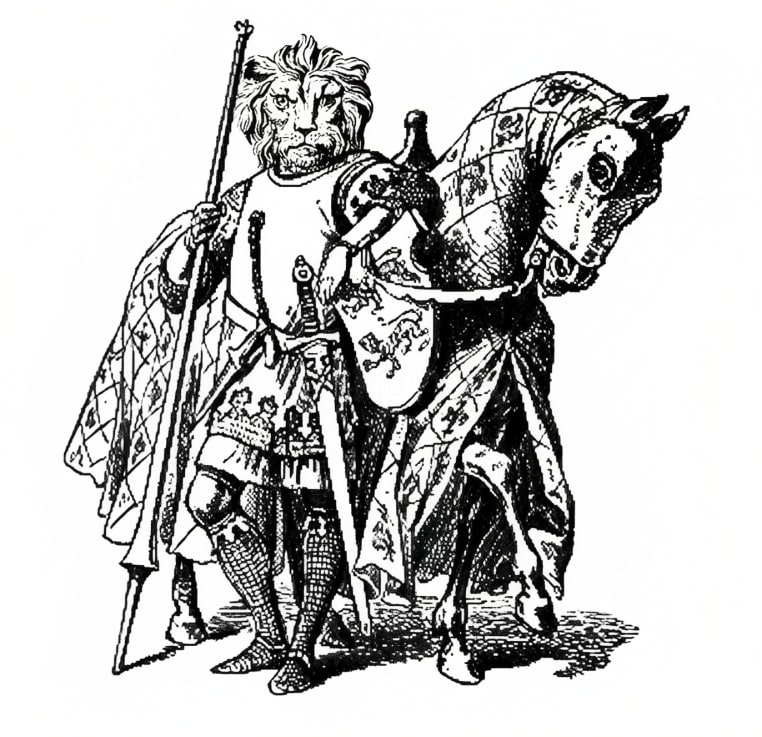
  Sabnock
10. Shax (also Chax, Shan, Shass, Shaz, Scox) is a Great Marquis of Hell, having power over 30 legions of demons on evil horses. He takes away the sight, hearing and understanding of any person under the conjurer's request, and steals money out of kings' houses, carrying it back to the people. He also steals horses and everything the conjurer asks. Shax can also discover hidden things if they are not kept by evil spirits, and sometimes gives good familiars, but sometimes those familiars deceive the conjurer. He should not be bothered too often. Shax is thought to be faithful and obedient, but is a great liar and will deceive the conjurer unless obliged to enter a magic triangle drawn on the floor. He will then speak marvellously and tell the truth. He knows when lies are told and uses these to teach lessons. He is depicted as a stork that speaks with a hoarse but subtle voice; his voice changes into a beautiful one once he enters the magic triangle.
11. Orias (also Oriax) is a Great Marquis of Hell, having 30 legions of demons under his command. He knows and teaches the virtues of the stars and the mansions of the planets (the influence of each planet depending on the astrological sign in which it is in a specific moment and the influence of that sign on an individual depending on how the zodiac was configured at the moment of their birth or at the moment of asking a question to the astrologist); he also gives dignities, prelacies, and the favour of friends and foes, and can metamorphose a man into any shape. Orias is depicted as a lion riding upon a strong horse, with a serpent's tail, and carrying two hissing vipers in his right hand.
12. Andras is a Great Marquis of Hell, having under his command 30 legions of demons. He sows discord among people. According to the Ars Goetia, Andras is a Grand Marquis of Hell, appearing with a winged angel's body and the head of an owl or raven, riding upon a strong black wolf and wielding a sharp and bright sword. He is the 63rd of the 72 spirits of Solomon. Andras is considered to be a highly dangerous demon, who could kill the conjuring magician and his assistants if precautions were not taken.
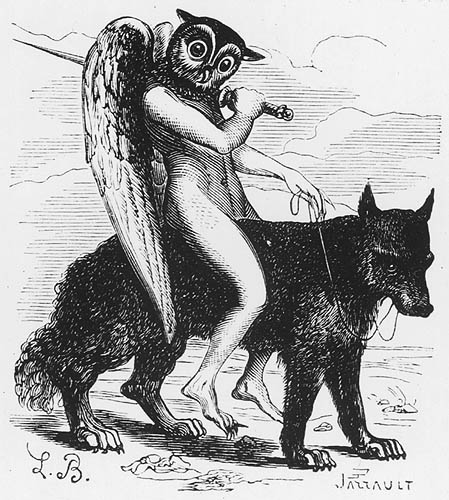
  Illustration of Andras from Collin de Plancy's Dictionnaire Infernal.
  The Dutch demonologist Johannes Wier, in his Pseudomonarchia Daemonum, says of Andras: "Andras is a great marquesse, and seemes in an angels shape with a head like a blacke night raven, riding upon a blacke and a verie strong woolfe, flourishing with a sharpe sword in his hand, he can kill the maister, the servant, and all assistants, he is author of discords, and ruleth thirtie legions." Another demonologist, Collin de Plancy, also mentions Andras in his writings, saying: "Grand Marquis of Hell. He appears to have the body of an angel and the head of a wood owl, and to be riding a black wolf and carrying in his hand a pointed saber. He teaches those whom he favors to kill their enemies, masters and servants. He stirs up trouble and dissension. He commands thirty legions."
13. Andrealphus (also Androalphus) appears as the 54th demon in Johannes Wier's Pseudomonarchia Daemonum and is described as a Great Marquis with the appearance of a peacock who raises great noises and teaches cunning in astronomy, and when in human form also teaches geometry in a perfect manner. He is also described as ruling over 30 legions of demons and having the ability to turn any man into a bird. Andrealphus also appears as the 65th demon in the Ars Goetia, where he is described with similar traits, but also including the ability to make men subtle in all things pertaining to Mensuration, among other things. He is also alternatively known as Adrammelech.
14. Kimaris (also Cimeies, Cimejes, Cimeries) is most widely known as the 66th demon of the first part of the Lemegeton (popularly known as the Ars Goetia). He is described as a warrior riding a goodly black horse, and possesses the abilities of locating lost or hidden treasures, teaching trivium (grammar, logic and rhetoric) and making a man into a warrior of his own likeness. He holds the rank of Marquis, and is served by 20 legions of demons. He also rules over all the spirits of Africa. Much the same description is found in the earlier text of Johannes Wier's Pseudomonarchia Daemonum. Earlier still is the Munich Handbook of Necromancy: Clm 849 (published by Richard Kieckhefer, as Forbidden Rites: a necromancer's manual of the 15th century 1998) which lists an entity named Tuvries with much the same characteristics, except that he has 30 legions of servitors, and can cause a person to cross seas and rivers quickly. Most likely, Tuvries is a mistranscription of Cymries. Kimaris, as Cimeries, is also found on Anton LaVey's list of infernal names, although it is not known why LaVey chose Kimaris as one of the comparatively few Goetic daimons included. Aleister Crowley, in 777, gives Kimaris the Hebrew spelling KYMAVR and attributes him to the four of disks and the third decan of Capricorn by night. KYMAVR may allude to "Khem-our" (black light), a form of Horus mentioned in H. P. Blavatsky's Secret Doctrine. In Sepher Sephiroth, he is listed as KYTzAVR, with a gematria of 327, although KYMAVR=277. Since Tzaddi=90, which is also Mem spelled in full, the gematric substitution may be deliberate or a blind. In Harleian Ms. 6482, titled "The Rosie Crucian Secrets" (printed by the Aquarian Press, 1985), Dr. Rudd lists Cimeries as the 26th spirit made use of by King Solomon. He also attributes an angel Cimeriel to one of Dee's Enochian Ensigns of Creation, the tablet of 24 mansions (see McLean, Treatise on Angel Magic). The earliest mention of Chamariel is in Rossi's Gnostic Tractate (see Meyer and Smith, Ancient Christian Magic). It is probable that the earliest mention of Kimaris is also Coptic, found in the London oriental mss 6796 where the name "Akathama Chamaris" appears (Meyer and Smith). In this text, the entity in question does not appear to be evil; rather, he is addressed as a godlike helping spirit. Baskin's Dictionary of Satanism speculates that Cimeries is derived from Cimmerians, a warlike people mentioned in the works of several classical authors as dwelling totally in darkness. It is also possible that Cimeries is derived from Chimaira, the three-headed, fire-breathing lion-goat-serpent who eventually became one of the guardians of the underworld. There is a precedent, considering that the harmless Phoenix is also demonized in the Ars Goetia.
15. Decarabia (also Carabia) is, according to The Lesser Key of Solomon, a Great Marquis of Hell, or a King and Earl according to the original Latin version of the Pseudomonarchia Daemonum (these were somehow left out of the English translation by Reginald Scot). He has 30 legions of demons under his command. Decarabia knows the virtues of all herbs and precious stones, and can change into all birds and sing and fly like them before the conjurer. He is depicted as appearing as a pentagram star, changing into a man under the conjurer's request.

== Earls ==
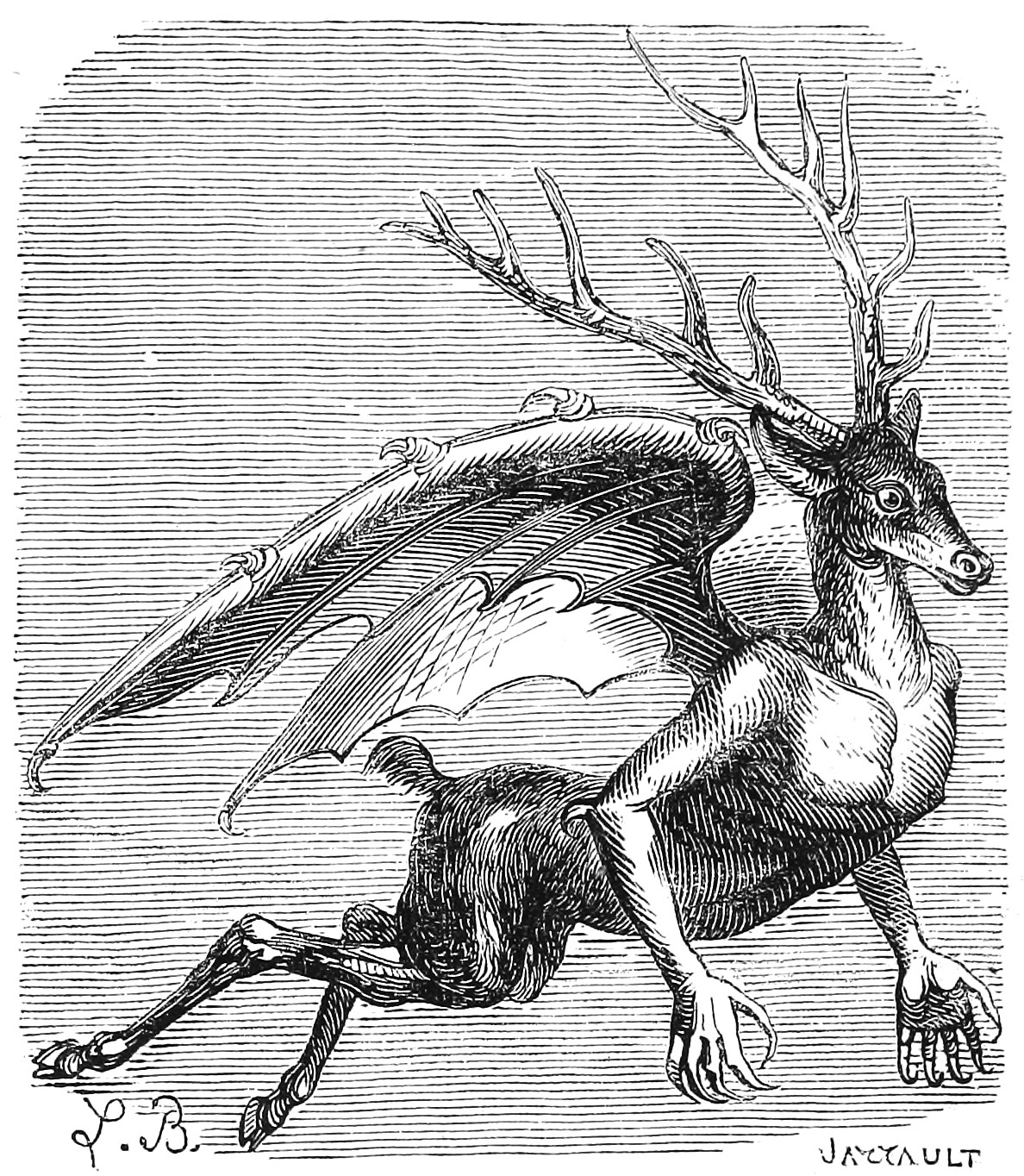
1. Illustration of Furfur from Collin de Plancy's Dictionnaire Infernal.
  Furfur (also Furtur, Ferthur) is a powerful Great Earl of Hell, being the ruler of 26 legions of demons. He is a liar unless compelled to enter a magic triangle where he gives true answers to every question, speaking with a rough voice. Furfur causes love between a man and a woman, creates storms, tempests, thunder, lightning, and blasts, and teaches on secret and divine things. He is depicted as a hart or winged hart, and also as an angel. "Furfur" or "furfurēs" in Latin means "bran". However, it seems more likely that the name is a corruption of "Furcifer", the Latin word for "scoundrel". Slightly less likely considering the context, but still possible, is that the name originated from "fūr", Latin for "thief".
2. Halphas (also Malthus, Malthas, Malthous) is an Earl of Hell, commanding 26 legions of demons, who is said to have a rough voice when speaking. He is often depicted in the shape of a stork, though most manuscripts describe Malthus as a hoarse-voiced stock dove. Malthus builds towers and fills them with ammunition and weapons, an armorer of sorts. He is also said to send his legions into battle, or to places designated by higher commanding demons.
3. Raum (also Raim, Raym, Räum) is a Great Earl of Hell, ruling 30 legions of demons. He is depicted as a crow which adopts a human form at the request of the conjurer. Raum steals treasures out of kings' houses, carrying them where he wishes, and destroys cities and dignities of men (He is said to have great dispraise for dignities). Raum can also tell all things past, present, and future, reconcile friends and foes and invoke love.
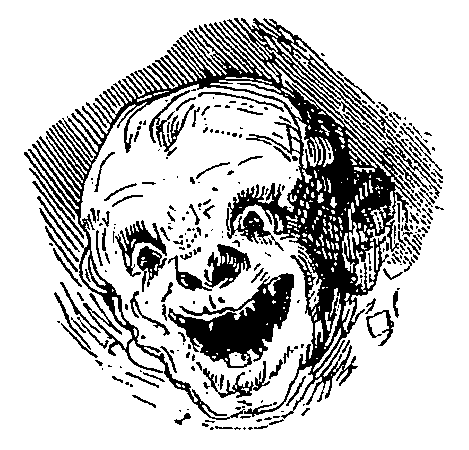
4. Bifrons as illustrated in Collin de Plancy's "Dictionnaire Infernal", 1863 edition.
  Bifrons (also Bifrovs, Bifröus, Bifronze) is an Earl of Hell, with 6 legions of demons under his command. He teaches sciences and arts, the virtues of the gems and woods, herbs, and changes corpses from their original grave into other places, sometimes putting magic lights on the graves that seem candles. He appears as a monster but then changes his shape into that of a man. The origin of the name is the Roman god Janus (Ianus Bifrons meaning "Two-faced Janus").
5. Andromalius is a mighty Great Earl of Hell, having 36 legions of demons at his service. He can bring back both a thief and the stolen goods, punishes all thieves and other wicked people, and discovers hidden treasures, all evilness, and all dishonest dealing. Andromalius is depicted as a man holding a big serpent in his hand, and according to The Lesser Key of Solomon:

The Seventy-second Spirit in Order is named Andromalius. He is an Earl, Great and Mighty, appearing in the form of a Man holding a Great Serpent in his Hand. His Office is to bring back both a Thief, and the Goods which be stolen, and to discover all Wickedness and Underhand Dealing, and to punish all Thieves and other Wicked People and also to discover Treasures that be Hid. He ruleth over 36 Legions of Spirits. His Seal is this, the which wear thou as aforesaid, etc.
—The Lesser Key of Solomon

== Knights ==
1. Furcas (also Forcas) is the sole Knight of Hell, ruling over 20 legions of demons. He teaches philosophy, astronomy, rhetoric, logic, chiromancy and pyromancy. Furcas is depicted as a strong old man with white hair and long white beard, who rides a horse while holding a sharp weapon (pitch fork).
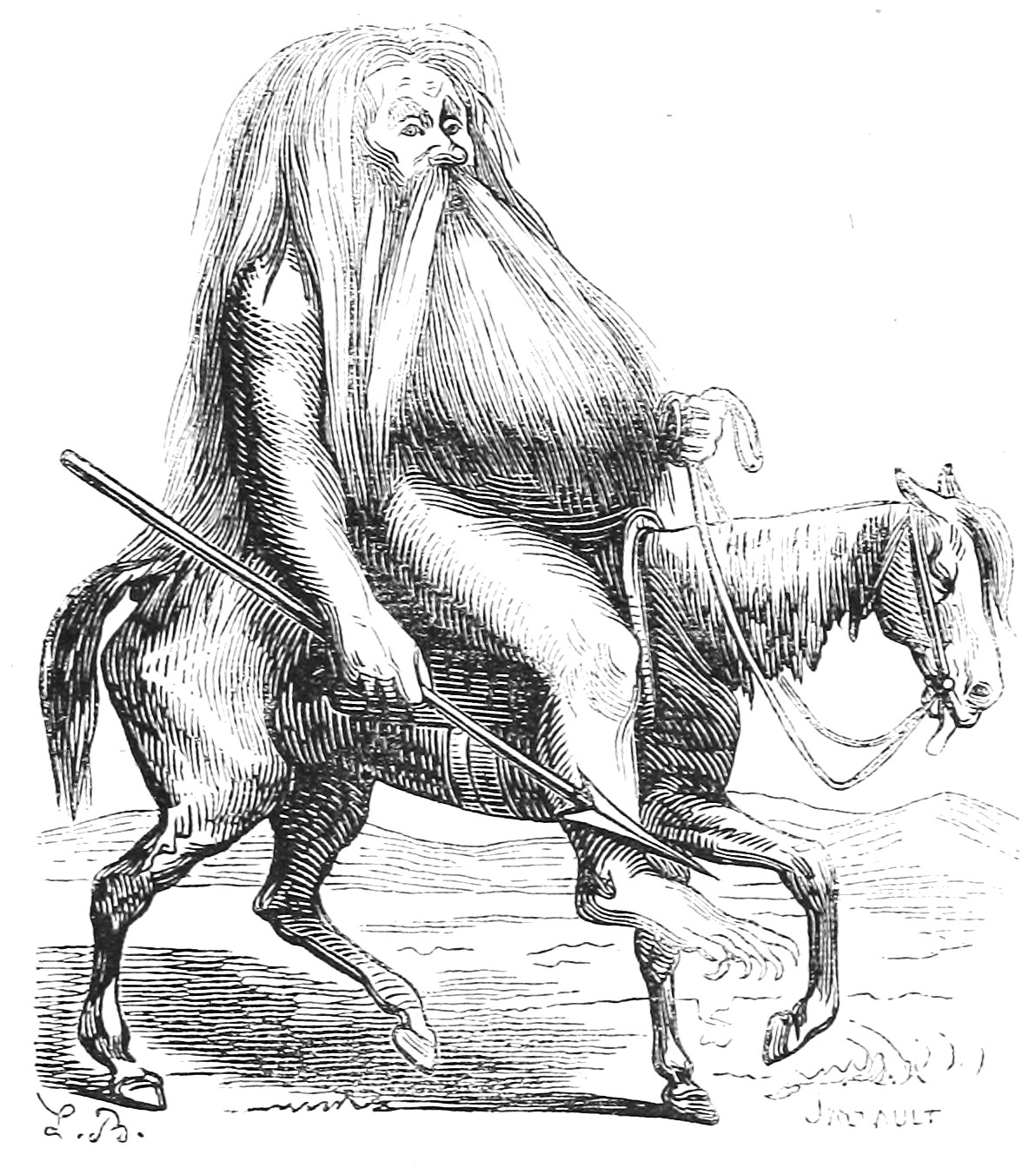
  Illustration of Furcas from Collin de Plancy's Dictionnaire Infernal.
  Furcas is a knight and commeth foorth in the similitude of a cruell man, with a long beard and a hoarie head, he sitteth on a pale horsse, carrieng in his hand a sharpe weapon, he perfectlie teacheth practike philosophie, rhetorike, logike, astronomie, chiromancie, pyromancie, and their parts: there obeie him twentie legions.
  — Johann Weyer (1583)
  The etymology of his name may be derived from the Latin word furca, meaning fork, or from Greco-Roman also meaning a sepulchre (tomb).

== Presidents ==
1. Marbas (also Barbas) is a Great President of Hell, governing 36 legions of demons. He answers truly on hidden or secret things, causes and heals diseases, teaches mechanical arts, and changes men into other shapes. He is depicted as a great lion that, under the conjurer's request, changes shape into a man.
2. Buer is a Great President of Hell, having 50 legions of demons under his command. He appears when the Sun is in Sagittarius. Buer teaches natural and moral philosophy, logic, and the virtues of all herbs and plants. He also heals all infirmities, especially of men, and gives good familiars. He is depicted in the shape of Sagittarius, which is as a centaur with a bow and arrows. Additionally, Louis Le Breton created an illustration of Buer, later engraved by M. Jarrault, depicting the demon as having the head of a lion and five, six, or more goat or horse legs surrounding his body to walk in every direction. The etymology of his name is uncertain.
3. (President/Count) Botis (also Otis, Otius) is a President and Earl of Hell, commanding 60 legions of demons. He tells of all things past and future, and reconciles friends and foes. He is depicted as an ugly viper, but when he changes shape, he puts himself in human shape, with big teeth and two horns. When in human shape he carries a sharp and bright sword in his hand.
4. (President/Count) Morax (also Foraii, Marax, Farax) is a President and Great Earl of Hell, having 36 legions of demons under his command. He teaches astronomy and all other liberal sciences, and gives good and wise familiars that know the virtues of all herbs and precious stones. He is depicted as a big bull with the face of a man, as well as a man with the face of a bull. It has been proposed that Morax is related to the Minotaur which Dante places in Hell (Inferno, Canto xii). See Fred Gettings, Dictionary of Demons (1988) His name seems to come from Latin "morax", that delays, that stops.
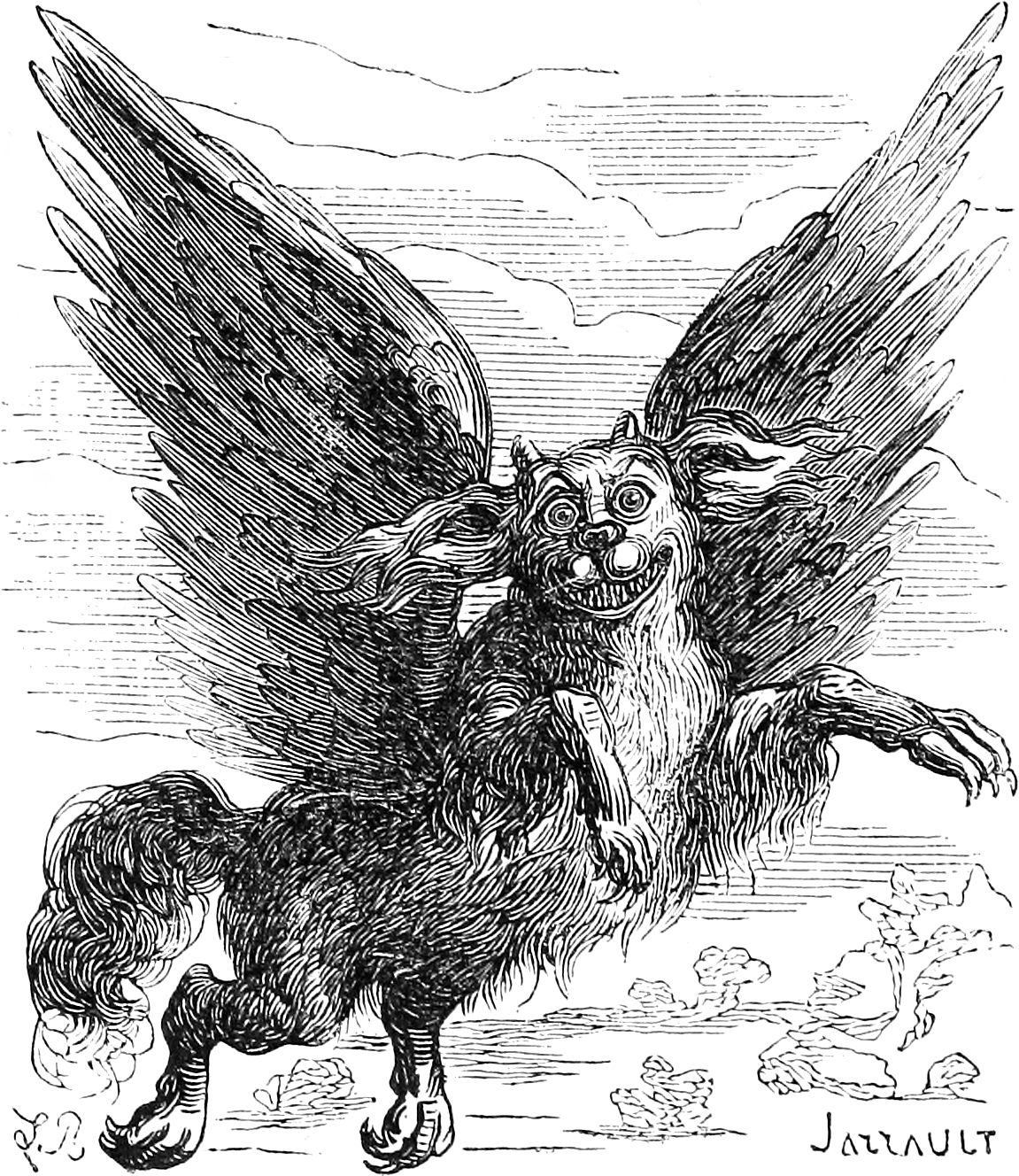
5. Illustration of Glasya-Labolas from Collin de Plancy's "Dictionnaire Infernal", 1863 edition.
  (President/Count) Glasya-Labolas (also Caacrinolaas, Caassimolar, Classyalabolas, Glassia-Labolis, Glasya Labolas, Gaylos-Lobos) is a mighty President and Earl of Hell, commanding 36 legions of demons. He is the author and captain of manslaughter and bloodshed, tells all things past and to come, gains the minds and love of friends and foes causing love among them if desired, incites homicides and can make a man invisible. He is depicted as a dog with the wings of a griffin.
6. Foras (also Forcas, Forrasis) is a powerful President of Hell, being obeyed by 29 legions of demons. He teaches logic and ethics in all their branches, the virtues of all herbs and precious stones, can make a man witty, eloquent, invisible, and live long, and can discover treasures and recover lost things. He is depicted as a strong man. His name seems to derive from Latin foras (out, outside).
  The Thirty-first Spirit is Foras. He is a Mighty President, and appeareth in the Form of a Strong Man in Human Shape. He can give the understanding to Men how they may know the Virtues of all Herbs and Precious Stones. He teacheth the Arts of Logic and Ethics in all their parts. If desired he maketh men invisible, and to live long, and to be eloquent. He can discover Treasures and recover things Lost. He ruleth over 29 Legions of Spirits, and his Seal is this, which wear thou, etc.
  — S. L. MacGregor Mathers (1904)
7. Malphas is a mighty Great President of Hell, having 40 legions of demons under his command. He builds houses, high towers and strongholds, throws down the buildings of the enemies, can destroy the enemies' desires or thoughts (and/or make them known to the conjurer) and all what they have done, gives good familiars, and can bring quickly artificers together from all places of the world. Malphas accepts willingly and kindly any sacrifice offered to him, but then he will deceive the conjurer. He is depicted as a crow that after a while or under request changes shape into a man, and speaks with a hoarse voice.
8. Haagenti (also Haage, Hage, Hgog) is a Great President of Hell, ruling over 33 legions of demons. He makes men wise by instructing them in every subject, transmutes all metals into gold, and changes wine into water and water into wine. Haagenti is depicted as a big bull with the wings of a griffin, changing into a man under request of the conjurer.
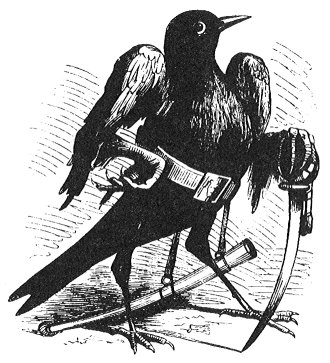
  Camio in bird form as depicted in Collin de Plancy's Dictionnaire Infernal, 1863 edition.
9. Camio (also Caim, Caym) is a Great President of Hell, ruling over 30 legions of demons. Much detail is offered. He is a good disputer, gives men the understanding of the voices of birds, cattle, dogs, and other animals, and of the noise of the waters too, and gives true answers concerning things to come. He is depicted in 19th and 20th century occultist illustrations as appearing in the form of the black bird called a thrush, but soon he changes his shape into a man that has a sharp sword in his hand. When answering questions he seems to stand on burning ashes or coals. He is a nocturnal demon that is most powerful during the month of December.
10. Ose (also Osé, Oze, Oso, Voso) is a Great President of Hell, ruling 30 legions of demons. He makes men wise in all liberal sciences and gives true answers concerning divine and secret things; he also brings insanity to any person the conjurer wishes, making them believe that they are the creature or thing the magician desired, or makes that person think he is a king and wearing a crown, or a pope. Ose is depicted as a leopard that after a while changes into a man. His name seems to derive from Latin "os", mouth, language, or "osor", that who abhors.
11. Amy (also Avnas, Auns, Hanar, Hanni) is listed as the 58th spirit in the Ars Goetia. He is a President of Hell, governing 36 legions of demons. According to Johann Weyer's Pseudomonarchia Daemonum:
  Amy is a great president, and appeareth in a flame of fier, but having taken mans shape, he maketh one marvelous in astrologie, and in all the liberal sciences, he procureth excellent familiars, he bewraieth treasures preserved by spirits, he hath the government of thirtie six legions, he is partlie of the order of angels, partlie of potestats, he hopeth after a thousand two hundreth yeares to returne to the seventh throne: which is not credible.
12. Valac (also Ualac, Valak, Valax, Valu, Valic, Volac, Volach) is a mighty Great President of Hell, having 30 legions of demons under his command. Valac is said to give true answers about hidden treasures; he reveals where serpents can be seen, and delivers them harmless to the magician. He is said to appear as a small poor boy with angel wings riding on a two-headed dragon.

== See also ==
- List of angels in Ars Paulina
- List of sigils of demons
