= Goetia (magic) =

Invocation of demons

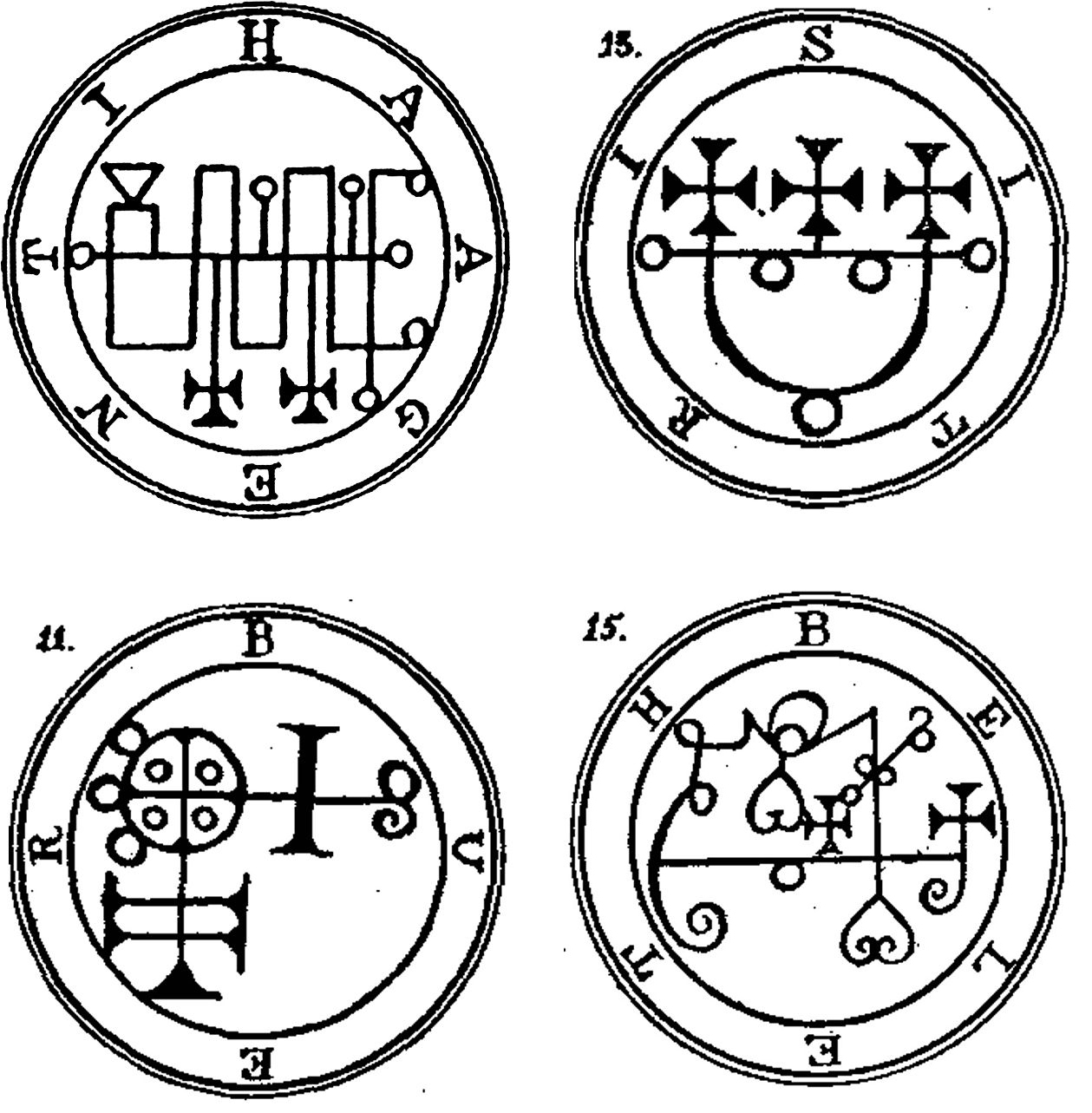
Seals of demons within the Ars Goetia: Haagenti, Sitri, Buer, and Beleth

Goetia, sometimes referred to as "low magic", is the practice of invocation and evocation of demons or daimons, lesser spirits that are used to control and attain powers or knowledge. Some interpret these lesser spirits as evil. However, in ancient Sumerian and Babylonian culture these spirits are simply accepted as natural facts of life and were frequently attached to persons as either neutral or evil. These spirits often times both brought destruction and offered protection, in a role similar to tutelary deities (protectors).

In ancient Greece, the term goetia was originally used as a derogatory term towards fraudulent and low-class magic, in opposition to the term of theurgy which was used to describe the magic conducted by the priests and philosophers.

== Etymology ==
The Latin word goetia (pronounced /goˈɛtia/) originates from the Greek word for sorcery or witchcraft (γοητεία), or the act of performing sorcery or witchcraft. Goetia is formed from the stem goēt- (γόητ-) of the noun goēs (γόης) meaning sorcerer or wizard.

The term goēs was also used as a derogatory term by higher-class theurgists, as a way to differentiate the practice of high and low magic.

== Goetia in practice ==
=== Ars Goetia ===
The Ars Goetia is the first grimoire of the Legemeton or Lesser Key of Solomon. Despite the other writings of the Legemeton and Goetia being attributed to King Solomon, the commonly attributed source for the Goetia is Johann Weyer's Pseudomonarchia Daemonum in his De praestigiis daemonum. The Ars Goetia contains the names, orders, offices, and seals of 72 demons, and educates on how to protect oneself when conjuring them.

Each of the demons of the Ars Goetia are said to offer powers and boons for those who conjure them. These gifts include but are not limited to invisibility, wealth, foresight, knowledge, "the destruction of bonds both spiritual and temporal" (in the case of Agares), and the unification of friend and foe (in the case of Raum).

1. King Bael
2. Duke Agares
3. Prince Vassago
4. Marquis Samigina
5. President Marbas
6. Duke Valefor
7. Marquis Amon
8. Duke Barbatos
9. King Paimon
10. President Buer
11. Duke Gusion
12. Prince Sitri
13. King Beleth
14. Marquis Leraje
15. Duke Eligos
16. Duke Zepar
17. Count/President Botis
18. Duke Bathin
19. Duke Sallos
20. King Purson
21. Count/President Morax
22. Count/Prince Ipos
23. Duke Aim
24. Marquis Naberius
25. Count/President Glasya-Labolas
26. Duke Buné
27. Marquis/Count Ronové
28. Duke Berith
29. Duke Astaroth
30. Marquis Forneus
31. President Foras
32. King Asmodeus
33. Prince/President Gäap
34. Count Furfur
35. Marquis Marchosias
36. Prince Stolas
37. Marquis Phenex
38. Count Halphas
39. President Malphas
40. Count Räum
41. Duke Focalor
42. Duke Vepar
43. Marquis Sabnock
44. Marquis Shax
45. King/Count Viné
46. Count Bifrons
47. Duke Vual
48. President Haagenti
49. Duke Crocell
50. Knight Furcas
51. King Balam
52. Duke Alloces
53. President Caim
54. Duke/Count Murmur
55. Prince Orobas
56. Duke Gremory
57. President Ose
58. President Amy
59. Marquis Orias
60. Duke Vapula
61. King/President Zagan
62. President Valac
63. Marquis Andras
64. Duke Flauros
65. Marquis Andrealphus
66. Marquis Kimaris
67. Duke Amdusias
68. King Belial
69. Marquis Decarabia
70. Prince Seere
71. Duke Dantalion
72. Count Andromalius

== See also ==
- Left-hand path and right-hand path – Dichotomy between two opposing approaches to magic
- The Goetia: The Lesser Key of Solomon the King
- List of demons in the Ars Goetia
- Magic (supernatural)
- Magic in the Greco-Roman world
- Theurgy
- Witchcraft
