= Livre des Esperitz =

15th- or 16th-century French grimoire

The Livre des Esperitz (Book of Spirits) is a 15th- or 16th-century French goetic grimoire that inspired later works including Johann Weyer's Pseudomonarchia Daemonum and the Lesser Key of Solomon. It contains ideas, traditions, and elements of works dating back to at least the 13th century.

Like the Lesser Key of Solomon, the Livre des Esperitz has been attributed to Solomon. The Livre des Esperitz merely lists the hierarchy of hell, and does not include prayers, conjurations, invocations, or spells to summon any being described. It does provide detailed descriptions of each spirit's appearance and function, and lists how many legions of demons serve under each. Many of these descriptions eventually found their way into later works, often unmodified.

The demons listed within it are first listed as: Lucifer, Bezlebut, Satan, Orient, Poymon, Equi, King Veal, Duke Agarat, Prince Barbas, Prince Bulfas, Marquis Amon, Count Batal, King Gemen, Duke Gazon, Prince Artis, Duke Machin, King Dicision, Duke Abugor, Count Vipos, Marquis Cerbere, Prince Carmola, Duke Estor, Prince Coap, Duke Deas, King Asmoday, Marquis Bitur, Duke Beal, Prince Forcas, Count Furfur, Marquis Margotias, Prince Oze, Marquis Lucay, Duke Pucel, Count Jayn, Duke Suralet, King Zagon, Prince Dragon, Prince Parcas, Duke Gorsin, Marquis Andralfas, Duke Flanos, King Brial, Marquis Fenix, Distolas

And then as:

1. Lucifer
2. Gay / Bezlebuth
3. Satan
4. Orient
5. Poymon
6. King Aymoymon
  - Equi
7. King Beal
8. Duke Agarat
9. Prince Barthas
10. Prince Bulfas
11. Marquis Amon
12. Prince Barbas
13. King Gemer
14. Duke Gazon
15. Duke Artis
16. Duke Machin
17. King Diusion
18. Duke Abugor
19. Count Vipos
20. Marquis Cerbere
21. Prince Carmola
22. Marquis Salmatis
23. Prince Coap
24. Duke Drap
25. King Asmoday
26. Prince Caap
27. Duke Bune
28. Marquis Bitur
29. Duke Lucubar
30. King Bugan
31. Prince Parcas
32. Duke Flavos
33. King Vaal
34. Marquis Fenix
35. Marquis Distolas
36. Duke Berteth
37. Count Dam
38. Duke Furfur
39. Prince Forcas
40. Lord Malpharas
41. Duke Gorsay
42. King Samon
43. Marquis Tudiras Hoho
44. Marquis Oze
45. Marquis Ducay
46. Duke Bucal
