= Zagan =

Zagan may refer to:

- Zagan (demon), a demon in the Ars Goetia
- Żagań, a town in west Poland
