= Voso =

Voso or VOSO may refer to:

- Vanadyl sulfate (VOSO_{4}), a well known inorganic compound of vanadium
- Ose (demon)
