= Phenex =

Goetic demon

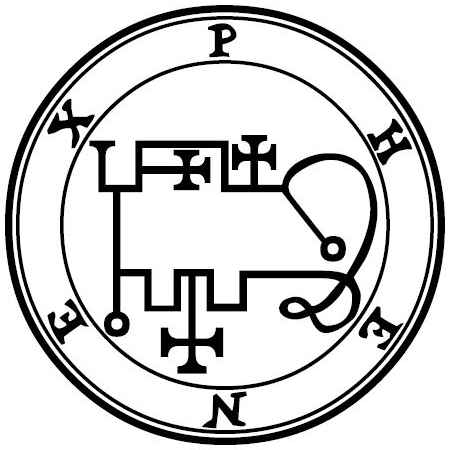
Phenex sigil

In demonology, Phenex (also spelled Pheynix, Phoenix, or Phoeniex) is a Goetic demon. A Great Marquis of Hell, he is said to have 20 legions of demons under his command. He appears as a phoenix with the siren-like singing voice of a child. He teaches sciences, is an excellent poet, and is very obedient to the conjuror once he takes human form. Phenex hopes to return to the seventh throne of Heaven after 1,200 years.

== Description ==
According to the 17th-century spellbook The Lesser Key of Solomon, Phenex is described as follows:

Phoenix is a great marquesse, appearing like the bird Phoenix, having a child's voice: but before he standeth still before the conjuror, he singeth many sweet notes. Then the exorcist with his companions must beware he give no ear to the melody, but must by and by bid him put on humane shape; then will he speak marvelously of all wonderful sciences. He is an excellent poet, and obedient, he hopeth to return to the seventh throne after a thousand two hundredth years, and governeth twenty legions.

== See also ==
- Phoenix (mythology)
- The Lesser Key of Solomon

== Sources ==
- S. L. MacGregor Mathers, A. Crowley, The Goetia: The Lesser Key of Solomon the King (1904). 1995 reprint: ISBN 0-87728-847-X.
