= Haagenti =

Figure of Hell in demonology

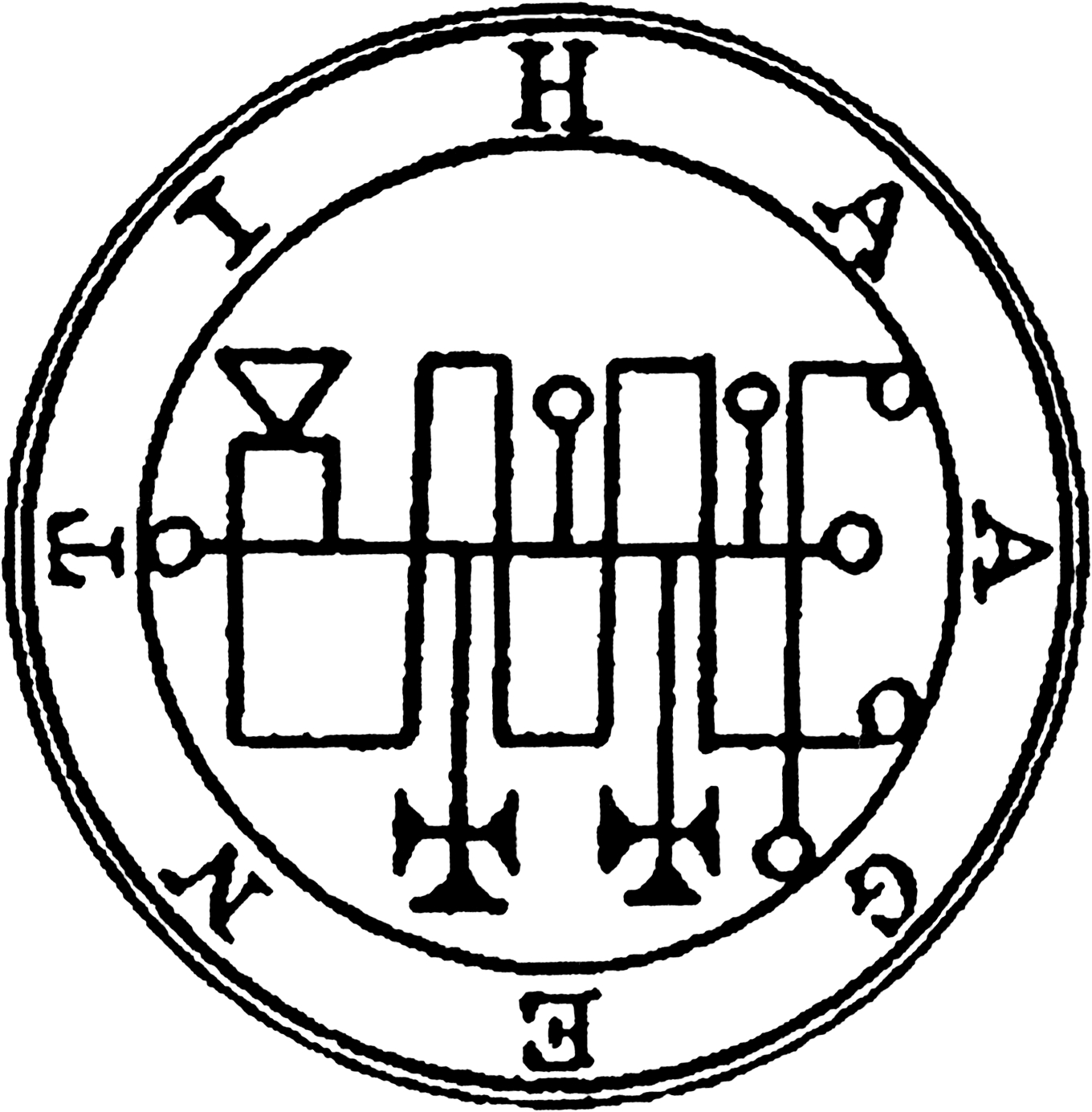
Seal of Haagenti from The Lesser Key of Solomon

In demonology, Haagenti is a Great President of Hell, ruling thirty-three legions of demons. He makes men wise by instructing them in every subject, transmutes all metals into gold, and changes wine into water and water into wine.

Haagenti is depicted as a big bull with the wings of a griffin, changing into a man under request of the conjurer.

Also called "Haage"/"Hgog".

== See also ==
- The Lesser Key of Solomon

== Sources ==
- S. L. MacGregor Mathers, A. Crowley, The Goetia: The Lesser Key of Solomon the King (1904). 1995 reprint: ISBN 0-87728-847-X.
