= Bune =

Demon

Bune is a demon listed in demonological grimoires such the Lesser Key of Solomon (Note: As the twenty-sixth spirit.) (including Thomas Rudd's version, as Bime) Johann Weyer's Pseudomonarchia Daemonum, (Note: As the twenty-third spirit.) Jacques Collin de Plancy's Dictionnaire Infernal, and the Livre des Esperitz. (Note: As the twenty-seventh spirit.)

All of these texts describe Bune as a duke who is able to move the dead, make one rich, and answer a variety of questions. The Livre des Esperitz claims that Bune rules 35 legions of spirits, while the other texts only give him 30 legions to command. The other texts further describe Bune's appearance as a three headed dragon (with one head being human) and give him the additional powers of making devils gather around graves and making one wise and charismatic.

Practicing occultist Carroll "Poke" Runyon suggests that the name ultimately derives from Buto (a title for Isis), as part of an overall claim that the Lesser Key of Solomon was by Solomon and rooted in Mesopotamian mythology.

According to Rudd, Bune is opposed by the Shemhamphorasch angel Haaiah.
