= Forneus =

Goetic demon

Seal of Forneus (Ars Goetia)

In demonology, Forneus is a Great Marquis of Hell, and has twenty-nine legions of demons under his rule. He teaches Rhetoric and languages, gives men a good name, and makes them be loved by their friends and foes.

He is depicted as a great sea monster. He causes men to have a good name and to have the knowledge and understanding of tongues. He makes one beloved by his foes as well as of his friends. He is partly of the Order of Thrones, and partly of that of Angels. His name seems to come from "fornus" (oven). He can take many different forms but mainly prefers his human form.

== See also ==
- The Lesser Key of Solomon

== Sources ==
- S. L. MacGregor Mathers, A. Crowley, The Goetia: The Lesser Key of Solomon the King (1904). 1995 reprint: ISBN 0-87728-847-X.
