= Valefar =

Duke of Hell in demonology

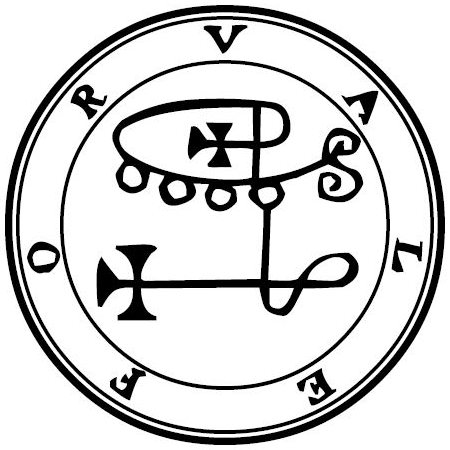
The sigil of Valefor as it appears in the Lesser Key of Solomon

In demonology, Valefar (also Valefor, Malaphar, Malephar, Valafar) is a Duke of Hell. He tempts people to steal and is in charge of a good relationship among thieves. Valefar is considered a good familiar by his associates "till they are caught in the trap". He commands ten legions of demons.

He is represented as a lion with the head of a man, or as a lion with the head of a donkey.

== Popular culture ==
Valefar is portrayed as a first-year student with a beastly appearance in the anime and manga series Welcome to Demon School! Iruma-kun.

In the 2001 video game Final Fantasy X, Valefar (spelled Valefor) is portrayed as a winged, gentle beast, and is the first familiar the player acquires.

== See also ==
- The Lesser Key of Solomon

== Sources ==
- S. L. MacGregor Mathers, A. Crowley, The Goetia: The Lesser Key of Solomon the King (1904). 1995 reprint: ISBN 0-87728-847-X.
