= Morax (demon) =

President of Hell in some demonologies

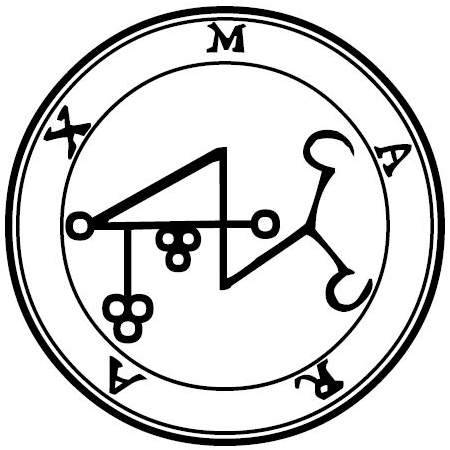

In demonology, Morax, also spelled Foraii, Marax, or Farax, is a Demon, Great Earl, and Count of Hell, having thirty (thirty-two, according to other authors) legions of demons under his command. He teaches astronomy and all other liberal sciences, and gives good and wise familiars that know the virtues of all herbs and precious stones.

He is depicted both as a man with the head of a bull, as well as a bull with the head of a man. It has been proposed that Morax is related to the Minotaur which Dante Alighieri places in Hell (Inferno, Canto xii).

His name seems to come from "morax", a Latin word meaning "that which delays, that which stops".

== In popular culture ==
Morax is portrayed in the Japanese anime and manga series Welcome to Demon School! Iruma-kun as a female teacher named Morax Momonoki.

Morax is also the name of the Geo Archon in 2020 video game Genshin Impact, who appears as Zhongli.

== See also ==
- The Lesser Key of Solomon
- Pseudomonarchia Daemonum

== Sources ==
- S. L. MacGregor Mathers, A. Crowley, The Goetia: The Lesser Key of Solomon the King (1904). 1995 reprint: ISBN 0-87728-847-X.
- Johann Weyer, Pseudomonarchia Daemonum (1577)
