= Ronove =

Marquis and Great Earl of Hell commanding nineteen legions of demons in demonology

Seal of Ronove (Ars Goetia)

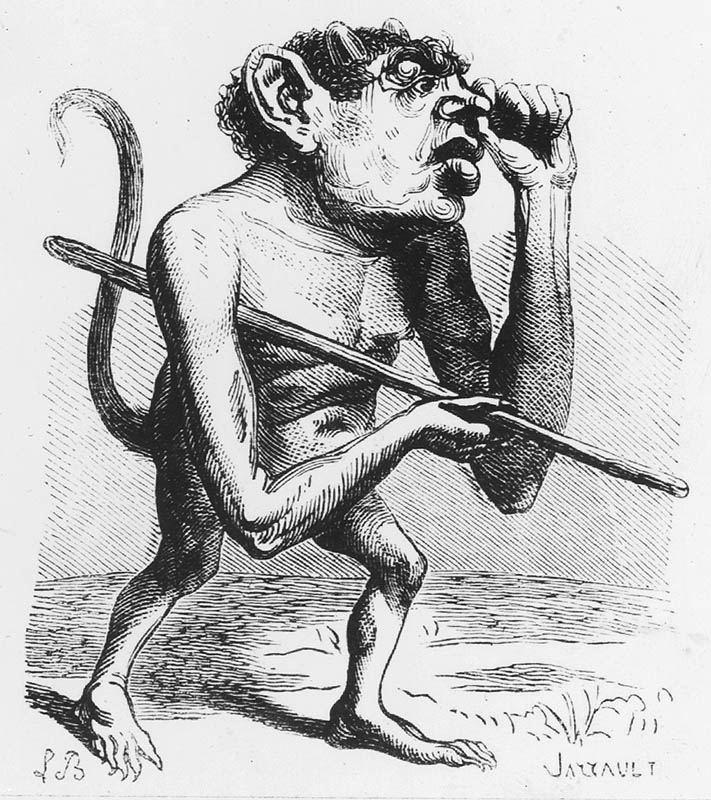
Ronove as depicted in the Dictionnaire Infernal

In demonology, Ronove is a Marquis and Great Earl of Hell, commanding nineteen legions of demons. He teaches art, rhetoric, languages, and gives good and loyal servants the favour of friends and foes.

He is depicted as a monster holding a staff, without detailing his appearance. He is also described as taker of old souls; often coming to earth to harvest souls of decrepit humans and animals near death.

It is also spelled Ronové, Ronwe and Ronoweh.

== See also ==
- The Lesser Key of Solomon

== Sources ==
- S. L. MacGregor Mathers, A. Crowley, The Goetia: The Lesser Key of Solomon the King (1904). 1995 reprint: ISBN 0-87728-847-X.
