= Agares =

Demon described in demonological grimoires

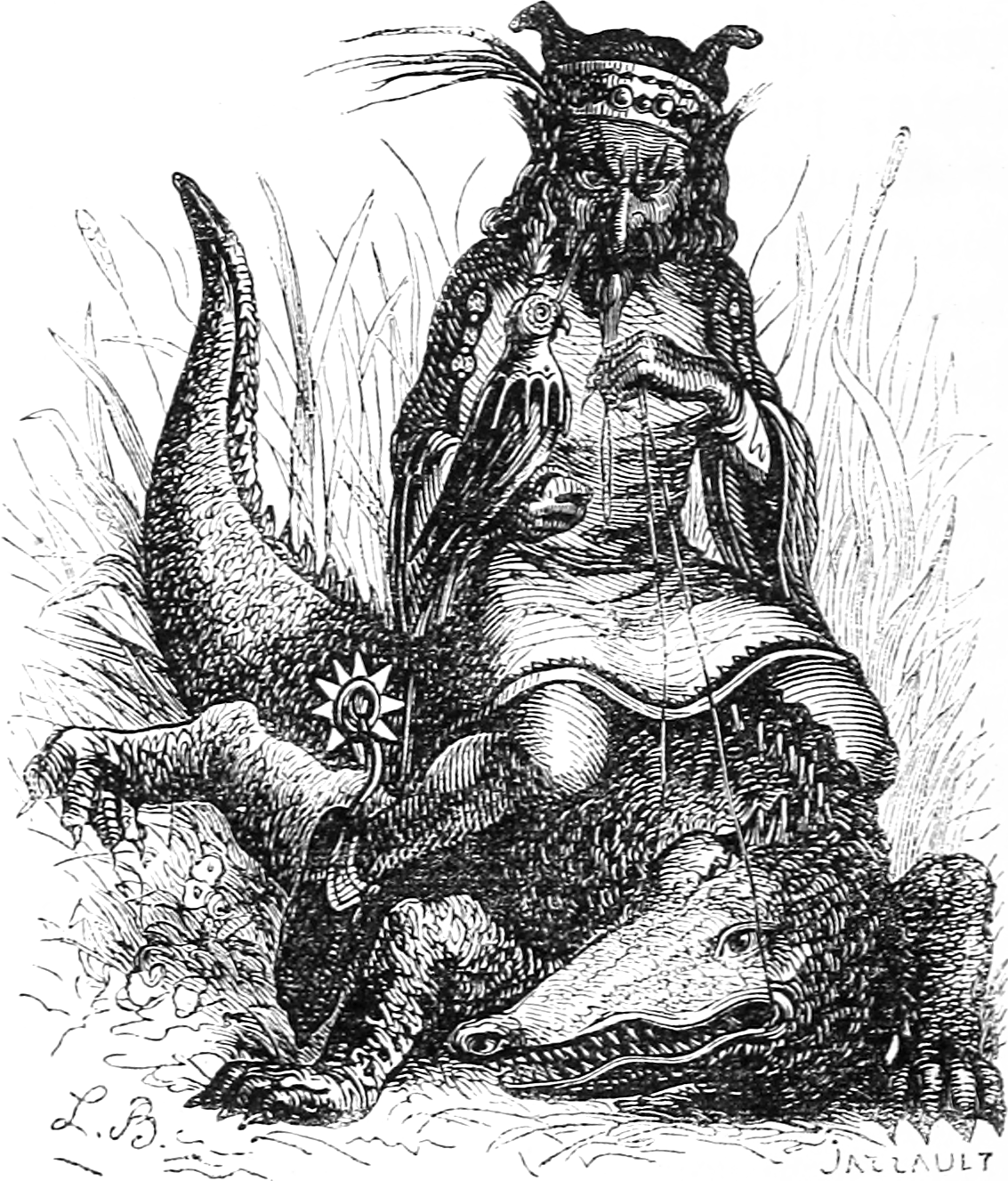
Agares from Collin de Plancy's Dictionnaire Infernal, Paris, 1863.

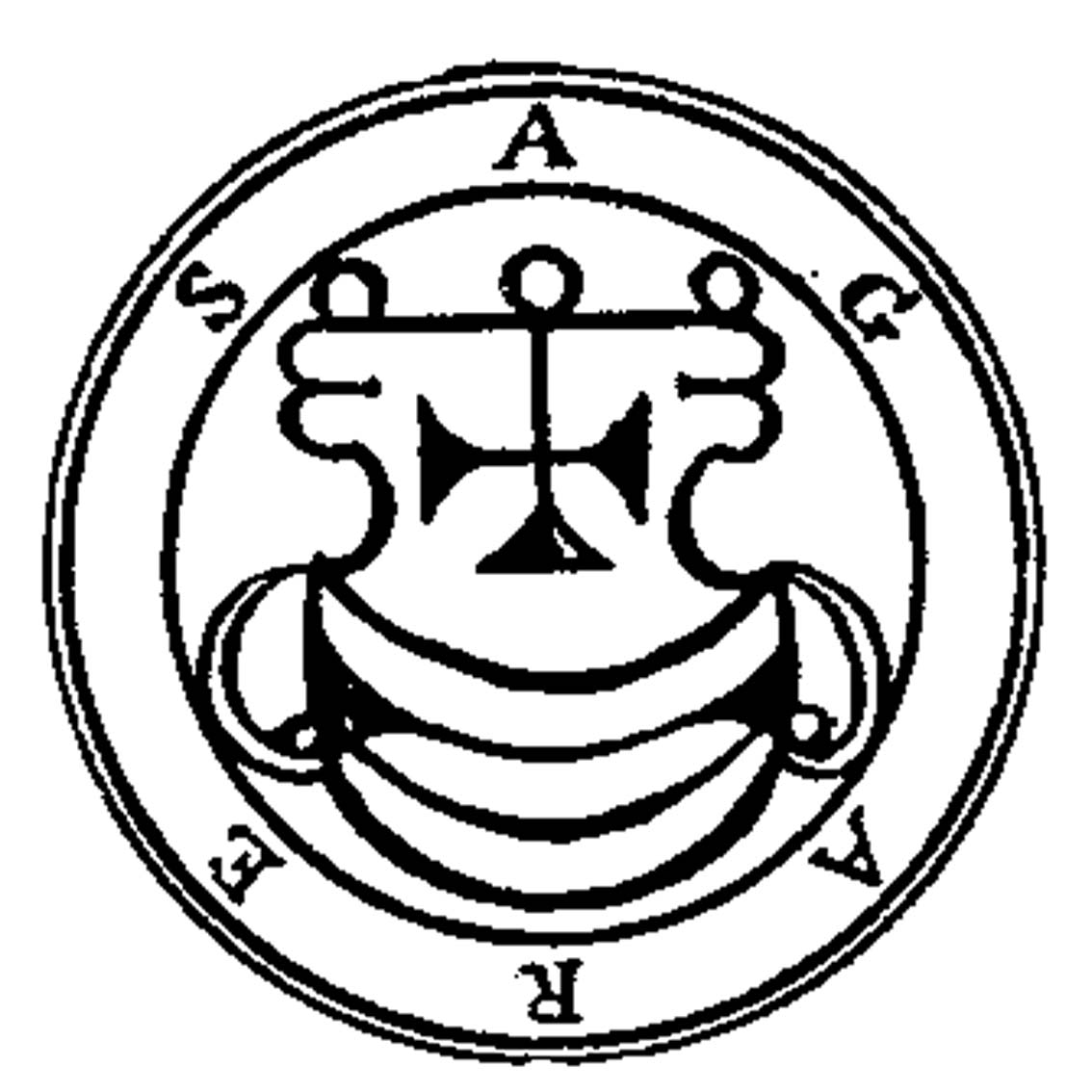
Sigil of Agares

Agares (also Agarus, Agarat) is a demon described in demonological grimoires.

== Description ==
Agares is described in grimoires such as the Livre des Esperitz (as Agarat), the Pseudomonarchia Daemonum, the Lesser Key of Solomon, and the Dictionnaire Infernal as a duke "under the power of the east," an "old man, riding upon a crocodile, and carrying a hawk on his fist," (Note: Peterson's critical edition of the Lemegeton, pages 7–8 read "Old man riding upon a Crocodill, very mildly, carrying a goshawke on his fist") who teaches languages, stops and retrieves runaway persons, causes earthquakes, and grants noble titles.

== Legions and standing ==
Lemegeton Clavicula Salomonis and the Pseudomonarchia Daemonum both list him as the second spirit, and state that he commands 31 legions of demons, while the Livre des Esperitz (which describes him simply as an old man) gives him 36.

The Book of the Office of Spirits places him (as Agaros) second under Oriens and describes him as an old man riding a cockatrice, without the hawk. The Grimoire of Pope Honorius (which refers to him as Agarus) is more brief, omitting the crocodile and hawk, and omitting his functions beyond languages and titles. The Grand Grimoire features him as a subordinate of Lucifuge Rofocale. According to Thomas Rudd, Agares is opposed by the Shem HaMephorash angel Jelial. Sloane MS 3824 mentions Agares throughout in invocations to summon spirits that guard treasure, and in the "Experiment of Agares," meant to draw him into a crystal.

== Popular culture ==
Agares possesses a young nun named Sister Adelina Marinescu (played by Ada Lupa) in the 2017 film, The Crucifixion, directed by Xavier Gens. The film is inspired by the 2005 Tanacu exorcism of Sister Maricica Irina Cornici in Romania.

Agares is portrayed under the same name as a sleepy young man in Japanese anime and manga series Welcome to Demon School! Iruma-kun.

Agares is also depicted in the Yu-Gi-Oh! Trading Card Game Monster Card "Number 60: Dugares the Timeless".
