= Ipos =

Prince and Earl of Hell in demonology

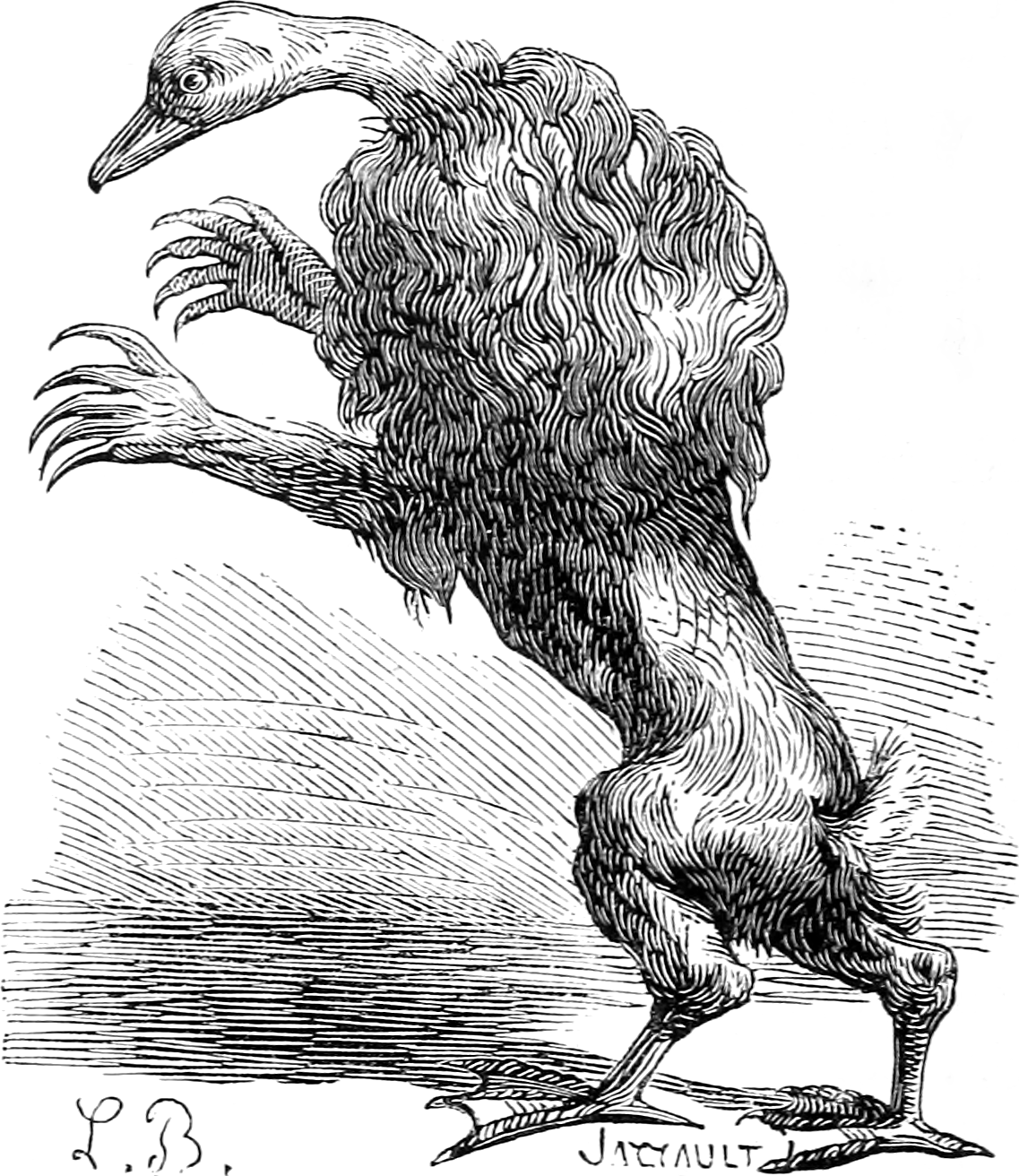
Ipos

In demonology, Ipos (also referred to as Aiperos, Ayperos, Ayporos or Ipes) is a Prince and powerful Earl of Hell (a Duke to some authors), having thirty-six legions of demons under his command. He knows and can reveal all things, past, present and future (only the future to some authors, and past and future to others). He can make men witty and valiant.

He is commonly depicted with the body of an angel with the head of a lion, the tail of a hare, and the feet of a goose, less frequently in the same shape but with the body of a lion, and rarely as a vulture.

== In popular culture ==
Ipos is portrayed as a tactics teacher in the anime and manga series Welcome to Demon School! Iruma-kun.

== See also ==
- The Lesser Key of Solomon

== Sources ==
- S. L. MacGregor Mathers, A. Crowley, The Goetia: The Lesser Key of Solomon the King (1904). 1995 reprint: ISBN 0-87728-847-X.
