= Botis =

Demon in the Lesser Key of Solomon

Seal of Botis (Ars Goetia)

Botis, also known as Otis and Otius, is a demon described in the Lesser Key of Solomon (as the seventeenth spirit) and the Pseudomonarchia Daemonum (as the ninth spirit) as a President and an Earl who initially appears as a viper before changing into a sword-toting, fanged, and horned human who discusses matters past, present, and future; brings favor from allies and enemies, and rules 60 legions of demons. In the Munich Manual of Demonic Magic, Botis appears as Otius, and is mostly identical except that he is a President and Count, appears in the more humanoid form to begin with, and rules only 36 legions of demons. In the Grand Grimoire, Botis appears as a subordinate of Agaliarept. According to Rudd, Botis is opposed by the Shem HaMephorash angel Loviah.
