= Orias =

Goetic demon

Seal of Orias (Ars Goetia)

In demonology, Orias (also spelled Oriax) is a Great Marquis of Hell, and has thirty legions of demons under his command. He knows and teaches the virtues of the stars and the mansions of the planets (the influence of each planet depending on the astrological sign in which it is in a specific moment and the influence of that sign on an individual depending on how the zodiac was configured at the moment of their birth or at the moment of asking a question to the astrologist); he also gives dignities, prelacies, and the favour of friends and foes, and can metamorphose a man into any shape.

The Fifty-ninth Spirit is Oriax, or Orias. He is a Great Marquis, and appeareth in the Form of a Lion, 3 riding upon a Horse Mighty and Strong, with a Serpent's Tail; 4 and he holdeth in his Right Hand two Great Serpents hissing. His Office is to teach the Virtues of the Stars, and to know the Mansions of the Planets, and how to understand their Virtues. He also transformeth Men, and he giveth Dignities, Prelacies, and Confirmation thereof; also Favour with Friends and with Foes. He doth govern 30 Legions of Spirits; and his Seal is this, etc.

== In popular culture ==
Orias is portrayed by the same name in the anime and manga series Welcome to Demon School! Iruma-kun.
