= Bathin =

Demon

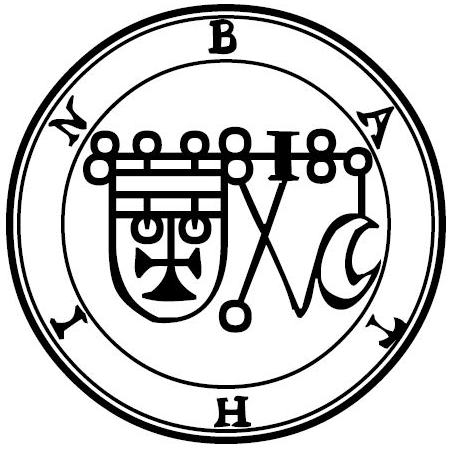
The Bathin seal.

Bathin (also Bathym, Mathim, or Marthim) is a demon described in demonological grimoires.

== Variations ==
He is ranked as a duke in the Lesser Key of Solomon (as the eighteenth spirit) and Johann Weyer's Pseudomonarchia Daemonum (as the tenth spirit), where he is described as a serpent-tailed and muscular man riding a pale horse, who knows the properties of plants and stones, transports people across countries, and rules 30 legions of demons. He also appears in the Livre des Esperitz, as "Machin," without the horse but ruling 37 legions of demons. The German edition of The Grimoire of Pope Honorius describes Bathin (again by the name Machin) as teaching about and providing foreign plants and rocks. In the Grand Grimoire, he (as Bathsin or Bathim) is listed as a subordinate of Fleurety. According to Rudd, Bathin is opposed by the Shemhamphorasch angel Caliel.
