= Ose (demon) =

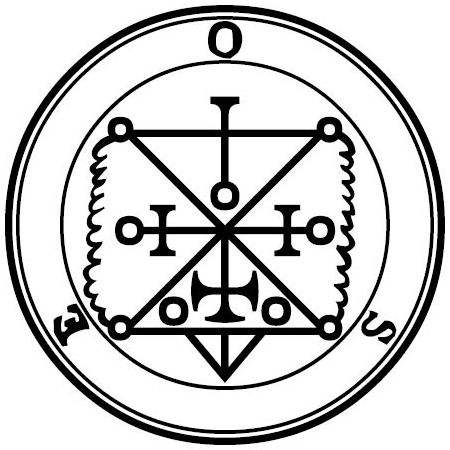
Osé seal from The Book of the Goetia of Solomon the King (1904)

In demonology, Osé is a Great President of Hell, ruling thirty legions of demons (Pseudomonarchia Daemonum gives no number of legions). He makes people wise in all liberal sciences and gives true answers concerning divine and secret things; he also brings insanity to any person the conjurer wishes, making them believe that they are king and wearing a crown, or a Pope. However, his spells only last 1 hour at a time.

Additionally, Ose has the ability to transform people into any shape the conjuror wishes. The victims of the curse will be unaware they have been transformed.

Ose is depicted as a leopard that after a while changes into a man.

== Other names ==
Osé is also known as Oso, or Vose.

== See also ==
- The Lesser Key of Solomon
