= Evocation =

Western tradition of summoning a spirit, demon, god

Evocation is the act of evoking, calling upon, or summoning a spirit, demon, deity or other supernatural agents, in the Western mystery tradition. Conjuration also refers to a summoning, often by the use of a magical spell. The conjuration of the ghosts or spirits of the dead for the purpose of divination is called necromancy. Comparable practices exist in many religions and magical traditions and may employ the use of mind-altering substances with and without uttered word formulas.

== Conjuration ==
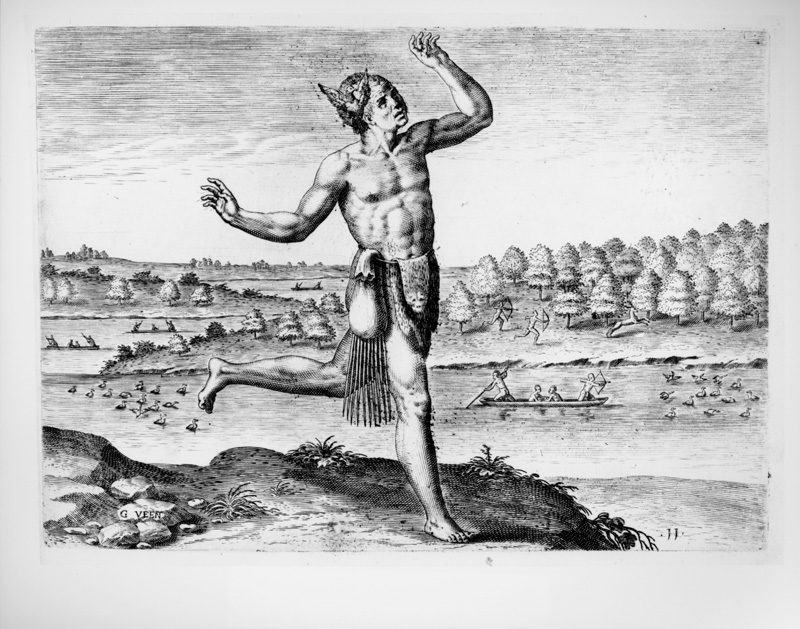
Native American "conjuror" in a 1590 engraving

In traditional and most contemporary usage, conjuration refers to a magical act of invoking spirits or using incantations or charms to cast magical spells. In the context of legerdemain, it may also refer to the performance of illusion or magic tricks for show. This article discusses mainly the original and primary usage, describing acts of a supernatural or paranormal nature.

Within some magical traditions today, such as Neopagan witchcraft, hoodoo and Hermeticism or ceremonial magic, conjuration may refer specifically to an act of calling or invoking deities and other spirits; or it may refer more generally to the casting of magic spells by a variety of techniques.

== In Western esotericism ==
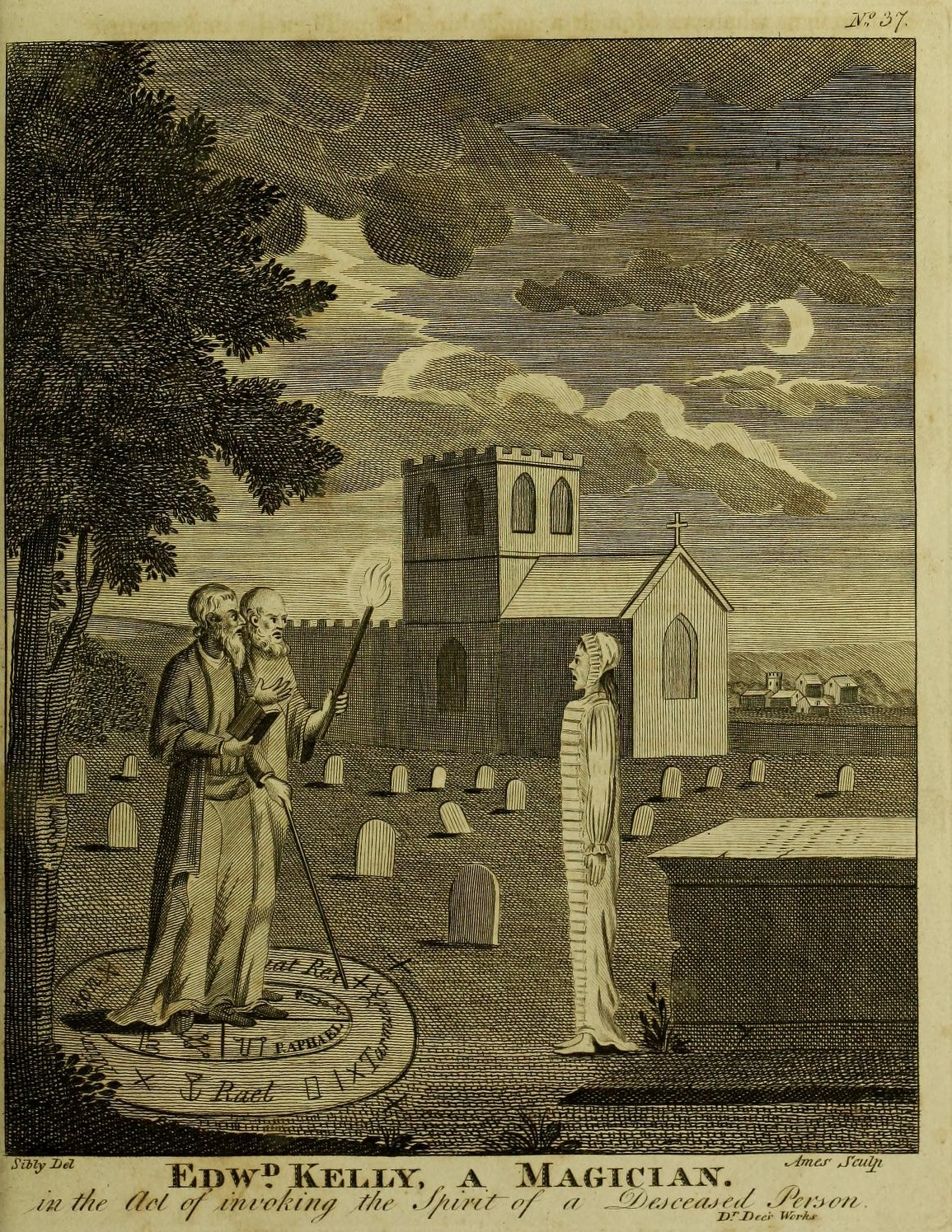
John Dee and Edward Kelley evoking a spirit

The Latin word evocatio was the "calling forth" or "summoning away" of a city's tutelary deity. The ritual was conducted in a military setting either as a threat during a siege or as a result of surrender, and aimed at diverting the god's favor from the opposing city to the Roman side, customarily with a promise of a better-endowed cult or a more lavish temple. Evocatio was thus a kind of ritual dodge to mitigate looting of sacred objects or images from shrines that would otherwise be sacrilegious or impious.

The calling forth of spirits was a relatively common practice in Neoplatonism, theurgy and other esoteric systems of antiquity. In contemporary western esotericism, the magic of the grimoires is frequently seen as the classical example of this idea. Manuals such as the Greater Key of Solomon the King, The Lesser Key of Solomon (or Lemegeton), the Sacred Magic of Abramelin the Mage.

== See also ==
- Apport – Paranormal transference
- Materialization – Alleged creation or appearance of matter from unknown sources
- Psychokinesis – Influencing of objects without physical interaction, with one's mind
- Thaumaturgy – Working of magical feats by an individual
- Theurgy – Magic used to invoke divine presence
