= List of sigils of demons =

List of attributed sigils of demons

In demonology, sigils are pictorial signatures attributed to demons, angels, or other beings. Although seventeenth century demonology texts assert these were used in ceremonial magic in the Middle Ages to summon higher beings, there is no evidence the designs existed prior to the seventeenth century. However, the designs draw on symbolic conventions established by medieval texts, themselves drawing on talismanic designs from earlier Arabic magic texts like Picatrix.

As the texts were copied by hand the known designs varied across manuscripts in terms of how much ornate detail they contain. Much of the set below is derived from a tidied, standardised set created for publication in Aleister Crowley's 1904 edition of the Lesser Key of Solomon.

Demon name	Image	Origins of the seal
Bael		Lesser Key of Solomon
Agares		Lesser Key of Solomon
Vassago		Lesser Key of Solomon
Samigina		Lesser Key of Solomon
Marbas		Lesser Key of Solomon
Valefor		Lesser Key of Solomon
Amon		Lesser Key of Solomon
Barbatos		Lesser Key of Solomon
Paimon		Lesser Key of Solomon
Buer		Lesser Key of Solomon
Gusion		Lesser Key of Solomon
Sitri		Lesser Key of Solomon
Beleth		Lesser Key of Solomon
Leraie		Lesser Key of Solomon
Eligos		Lesser Key of Solomon
Zepar		Lesser Key of Solomon
Botis		Lesser Key of Solomon
Bathin		Lesser Key of Solomon
Sallos		Lesser Key of Solomon
Purson		Lesser Key of Solomon
Marax		Lesser Key of Solomon
Ipos		Lesser Key of Solomon
Aim		Lesser Key of Solomon
Naberius		Lesser Key of Solomon
Glasya-Labolas		Lesser Key of Solomon
Bune		Lesser Key of Solomon
Ronove		Lesser Key of Solomon
Berith		Lesser Key of Solomon
Forneus		Lesser Key of Solomon
Foras		Lesser Key of Solomon
Asmoday		Lesser Key of Solomon
Gaap		Lesser Key of Solomon
Furfur		Lesser Key of Solomon
Marchosias		Lesser Key of Solomon
Stolas		Lesser Key of Solomon
Phenex		Lesser Key of Solomon
Halphas		Lesser Key of Solomon
Malphas		Lesser Key of Solomon
Raum		Lesser Key of Solomon
Focalor		Lesser Key of Solomon
Vepar		Lesser Key of Solomon
Sabnock		Lesser Key of Solomon
Shax		Lesser Key of Solomon
Vine		Lesser Key of Solomon
Bifrons		Lesser Key of Solomon
Vual		Lesser Key of Solomon
Haagenti		Lesser Key of Solomon
Crocell		Lesser Key of Solomon
Furcas		Lesser Key of Solomon
Balam		Lesser Key of Solomon
Alloces		Lesser Key of Solomon
Camio		Lesser Key of Solomon
Murmur		Lesser Key of Solomon
Orobas		Lesser Key of Solomon
Gremory		Lesser Key of Solomon
Ose		Lesser Key of Solomon
Amy		Lesser Key of Solomon
Orias		Lesser Key of Solomon
Vapula		Lesser Key of Solomon
Zagan		Lesser Key of Solomon
Valac		Lesser Key of Solomon
Andras		Lesser Key of Solomon
Haures		Lesser Key of Solomon
Andrealphus		Lesser Key of Solomon
Cimeies		Lesser Key of Solomon
Amdusias		Lesser Key of Solomon
Belial		Lesser Key of Solomon
Decarabia		Lesser Key of Solomon
Seere		Lesser Key of Solomon
Dantalion		Lesser Key of Solomon
Andromalius		Lesser Key of Solomon
Astaroth		Lesser Key of Solomon
Lucifer		Grimorium Verum

== See also ==
- List of theological demons
- List of demons in the Ars Goetia
- List of occult symbols
