= Shem HaMephorash =

Hidden name of God in Judaism and occultism

Shem HaMephorash (Hebrew: שֵׁם הַמְּפֹרָשׁ Šēm hamMəfōrāš, also Shem Ha-Mephorash), meaning "the explicit name", was originally a Tannaitic term for the Tetragrammaton. Early sources, from the Mishnah to the Geonim, only use "Shem HaMephorash" to refer to the four-letter Tetragrammaton. In the Rishonic period, the same term was reinterpreted to refer to a 42-letter name. In Kabbalah, it may also refer to 22 or 72-letter names, the latter being more common.

== 12- and 42-letter names ==
In addition to the Shem HaMephorash, b. Qiddushin 72a describes a 12-letter name and a 42-letter name. By the start of the Rishonic period, the term "Shem HaMephorash" could also be used for the 42-letter name, and this interpretation was retrojected into the Mishnah.

=== 12-letter name ===
The medievals debate whether the 12-letter name is a mundane euphemism, unknown, YHVH-EHYH-ADNY (יהוה אהיה אדני), or YHVH-YHVH-YHVH (יהוה יהוה יהוה). Wilhelm Bacher and Adolphe Franck suggest that the 12-letter name was Chokmah)-Tevunah)-Da'at (חכמה תבונה דעת), but the doctrine of the Sefirot originated in the 13th century, roughly a thousand years after the 12-letter name was first described. A. Haffer suggests that it is אל יהוה אלהינו (El YHVH Elohenu) from Deut. 6:4.

=== 42-letter name ===
Wilhelm Bacher and Adolphe Franck suggest that the 42-letter name was the full 10 Sefirot, but the Sefirot did not yet exist in Talmudic times. J. Goldberger argues that the 42-letter name was derived by gematriya, representing either אהיה אהיה or אלוה. Ignatz Stern wrote that it represents the names listed by Sifra d'Tziuta Ch. 4, (Note: Stern lists these as "אהיה אשר אהיה יה יהויה אל אלהים יהוה צבאות אל חי אדני" to make 42 letters. In the text only "אהיה יה יהו אל אלהים [יהוה] צבאות שדי אדני".) winning the support of Ginsburg, but this passage is not even as old as the Zohar. Robert Eisler derives it from Ex. 34:6. (Note: יהוה יהוה אל רחום וחנון ארך אפים ורב חסד ואמת נוצר חסד) A. Haffer suggests that it is יהוה אחד ברוך שם כבוד מלכותו לעולם ועד.

According to Maimonides and Rashi, the 42-letter name is unknown, but Rabbeinu Tam writes that it is "formed from 'In the beginning . . .' and the last verse" and Hayy ben Sherira says it is the acronym of the medieval piyyut Ana b'Koach, and Joshua Trachtenberg argues that Hayy's tradition may legitimately represent the Talmudic intent. although even Hayy did not claim to know its pronunciation. According to Hayy,

Though the letters of the 42-letter name are known, the pronunciation has not been [successfully] transmitted. Some say that it begins אַבְגִיתַץ ʾabgîtaṣ while others say that it begins אַבַגְיְתַץ ʾabagyǝtaṣ, and some say that it concludes שְׁקוּצִית šǝqûṣît while other say that it concludes שַׁקְוַצִית šaqwaṣît, (Note: Each manuscript of Hayy's responsum contains different proposed pronunciations. This follows MS Oxford heb. d.2.) and there are many more disputes besides which none can resolve.

Solomon ibn Adret (1235-1310) records that:

Different places have different pronunciations [of the 42-letter name]. Some pronounce it as fourteen words composed of three letters each, while others pronounce it as seven words composed of six letters each. The scholars of this land [Spain] follow the latter method, and such is the tradition received from Hayy, but I heard that the scholars of Ashkenaz pronounce it as fourteen three-letter words. There are also differences between the letters of our version and those of Ashkenaz [...] as to what you say, that each three-letter word is pronounced shewa-patah, there is one word pronounced shewa-shuruq, which is the thirteenth: the shin with a shewa and the waw with a shuruq. (Note: This is compatible with options mentioned in Hayy, if read to represent אֲבַגְ/יְתַץ and שְׁקוּ/צִית.)

Piyyutim which used this 42-letter name as their acrostic were popular among the Hasidei Ashkenaz, and many different poems were composed based on different versions of the name. The only one of these to survive in Jewish liturgy is Ana b'Koach.

== 22-letter name ==
Cairo Geniza amulets (Oxford e.107:10, T-S K 1.127) contain the name א◌ׄנ◌ׄק◌ׄת◌ׄם◌ׄ פסתם פספסים ודיונסים. A similar amulet is included in the back of Sefer Raziel HaMalakh, containing אנקתם פסתם פספסים דיונסים, which the commentary describes as "the 22-letter name." Its origins are unknown, with no connection to Hebrew or Aramaic being found, and no agreement on any particular Greek or Zoroastrian origin. Nathan Hannover was responsible for introducing it into popular Priestly Blessing liturgy, and also composed poems on the model of Ana b'Koach using the 22-letter name as his acrostic.

== 216-letter, 72-fold name ==
=== In Judaic Kabbalah ===
The 72-fold name is highly important to Sefer Raziel HaMalakh. It is derived from Exodus 14:19–21, read boustrophedonically to produce 72 names of three letters. This method was explained by Rashi, (b. Sukkah 45a), as well as in Sefer HaBahir (c. 1150~1200). Kabbalist legends state that the 72-fold name was used by Moses to cross the Red Sea, and that it could grant later holy men the power to cast out demons, heal the sick, prevent natural disasters, and even kill enemies.

According to G. Lloyd Jones,

To overcome the problems posed by the doctrine of God's transcendence, the early Jewish mystics developed an emanation theory in which the alphabet played an important part. They taught that the universe was divided into ten angelic spheres, each one governed by an intermediary or emanation of the divine. There were seventy-two inferior angels through whom the intermediaries could be approached. Contact with this celestial world was achieved by manipulating the letters of the Hebrew alphabet. [...] This invocatory technique may be traced through the works of Joseph Gikatilla to the famous thirteenth-century Kabbalist Abraham Abulafia.

Liber Semamphoras (aka Semamphoras, Semyforas) is the title of a Latin translation of an occult or magical text of Jewish provenance attributed to Solomon. It was attested in 1260 by Roger Bacon, who complained about the linguistic corruption that had occurred in translating Liber Semamphoras into Latin from Hebrew. It is heavily indebted to Sefer HaRazim through its Latin versions, Liber Sepher Razielis idest Liber Secretorum seu Liber Salomonis, and seemingly replaced the more explicitly magical text Liber magice in the Razielis.

=== In Christian Kabbalah ===
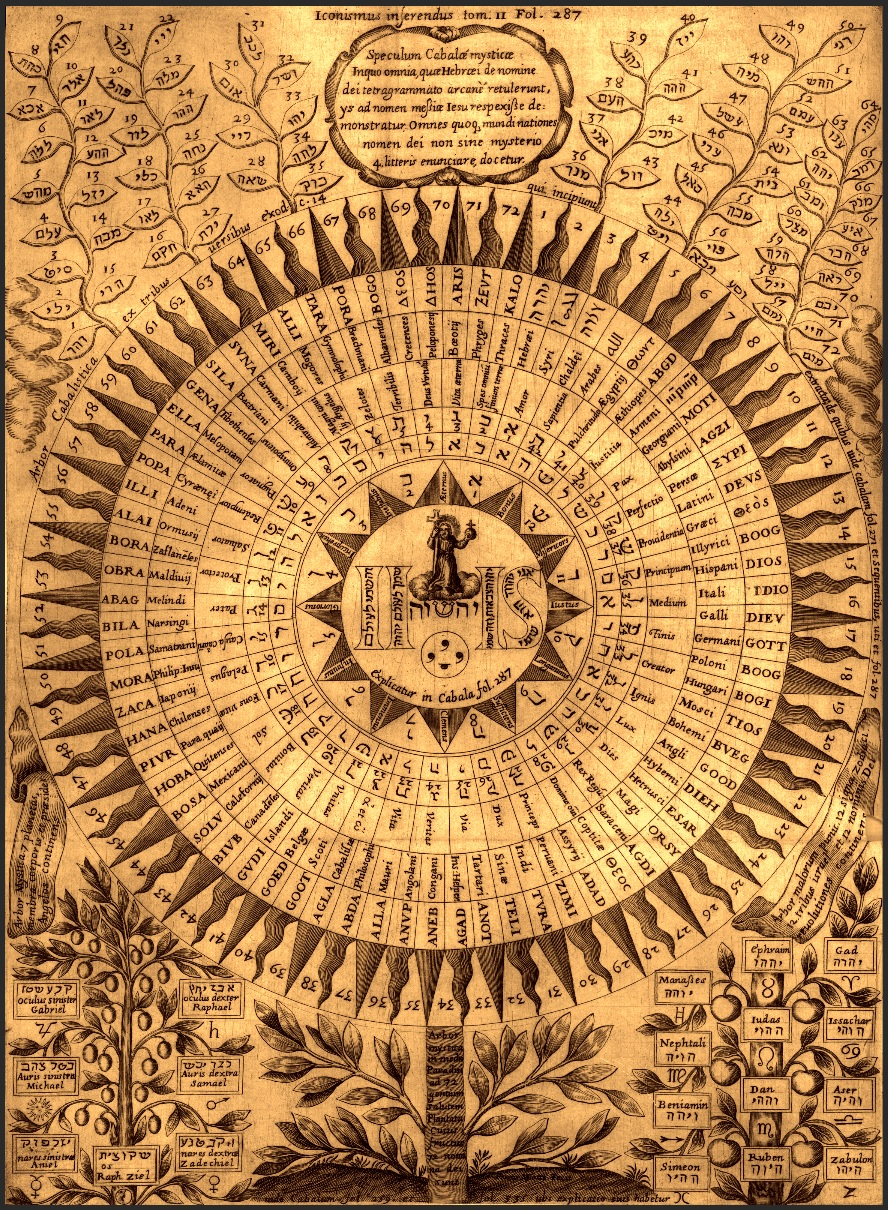
The 72 names of God illustrated by Athanasius Kircher in Oedipus Aegyptiacus (1653)

Johann Reuchlin (1455–1522) considered these 72 names, made pronounceable by the addition of suffixes such as 'El' or 'Yah', to be the names of angels, individuated products of God's will. Reuchlin refers to and lists the 72 Angels of the Shem Hamephorash in his 1517 book De Arte Cabalistica. According to Bernd Roling,

After deriving a Shem Ha-Mephorash of the 72 angelic names from the biblical verses of Exodus 14,19ff., Reuchlin makes a statement concerning the metaphysical significance of the names. [...] The names of the angels are products of the will of God. They are substantially based on the tetragrammaton, and through this connection they illumine and enhance man's spiritual return to God. [...] With the insertion of divine names such as 'El' or 'Yah', angelic names become pronouncable, and God himself (being nature) is the basis of angelic individuation.

Reuchlin's cosmology in turn influenced Heinrich Cornelius Agrippa (1486–1535) and Athanasius Kircher (1602–1680).

In 1686, Andreas Luppius published Semiphoras und Schemhamphoras, a German translation of the earlier Latin text, Liber Semiphoras (see previous section), which Luppius augmented heavily with passages from Agrippa's De Occulta Philosophia and other sources.

=== In Hermetic Qabalah and Goetia ===
Blaise de Vigenère (1523–1596), following Reuchlin, featured the 72 angels in his writings. De Vigenère's material on the Shemhamphorash was later copied and expanded by Thomas Rudd (1583?–1656), who proposed that it was a key (but often missing) component to the magical practices in the Lesser Key of Solomon, as a balancing force against the evil spirits of the Ars Goetia or in isolation. Skinner and Rankine explain that de Vigenère and Rudd adopted these triliteral words with '-el' or '-yah' (both Hebrew for "god") added to them as the names of the 72 angels that are able to bind the 72 evil spirits also described in The Lesser Key of Solomon (c. mid-17th century). (Note: Skinner and Rankine's explanation (in Rudd 2007, pp. 71–73) of how the triliterals are produced corresponds with the explanation given in McLaughlin & Eisenstein n.d., and the Hebrew names they give in their tables (pp. 366–376, cf. pp. 405–407) also correspond with the triliterals in the table given by McLaughlin & Eisenstein.)

Blaise de Vigenère's manuscripts were also used by Samuel Liddell MacGregor Mathers (1854–1918) in his works for the Hermetic Order of the Golden Dawn. Mathers describes the descent of power from Tetragrammaton through 24 thrones of the Elders of the Apocalypse, each with a crown of three rays:

Four is the number of the letters of the Tetragrammaton. Four is also the number of the letters of the name ADNI which is its representative and key. The latter name is bound with the former and united thereto, thus IAHDVNHY forming a name of 8 letters. 8 X 3, the number of the Supernal Triad, yields the 24 thrones of the Elders of the Apocalypse, each of whom wears on his head a golden crown of three rays, each ray of which is a name, each name an Absolute Idea and Ruling Power of the great name YHVH Tetragrammaton.

The number 24 of the thrones multiplied by the 3 rays of the crown which equals 72, the name of God of 72 letters, which is thus mystically shown in the name YHVH, as under: (Or as the book of Revelation says: "When the living creatures (the four Kerubim the Letters of the Name) give glory to Him, etc. the four and twenty elders fall down before Him and cast their crowns before the Throne, etc." (that is the Crowns, which each bear 3 of the 72 Names, and these 72 names are written on the leaves of the Tree of Life which were for the healing of the nations.)

These are also the 72 names of the ladder of Jacob on which the Angels of God ascended and descended. [...] The 72 Names of the Deity are thus obtained. The 19th, 20th, and 21st verses of the XIV Chapter of the Book of Exodus each consist of 72 letters...

=== Reuchlin's angels of the Shem HaMephorash ===
#	Angel (per Reuchlin)		Demon ruled (per Rudd)	Biblical verse (per Rudd)
#	Name	Rank	Demon ruled (per Rudd)	Biblical verse (per Rudd)
1	והויה (Vehuiah)	Seraphim	Bael	Psalms 3:3
2	יליאל (Jelial)	Seraphim	Agares	Psalms 22:19
3	סיטאל (Sitael)	Seraphim	Vassago	Psalms 91:2
4	עלמיה (Elemiah)	Seraphim	Gamigin	Psalms 6:4
5	מהשיה (Mahasiah)	Seraphim	Marbas	Psalms 34:4
6	ללהאל (Iehahel)	Seraphim	Valefar	Psalms 9:11
7	אכאיה (Achaiah)	Seraphim	Aamon	Psalms 103:8
8	כהתאל (Cahethel)	Seraphim	Barbatos	Psalms 95:6
9	הזיאל (Haziel)	Cherubim	Paimon	Psalms 25:6
10	אלדיה (Aladiah)	Cherubim	Buer	Psalms 33:22
11	לאויה (Laviah/Lauiah)	Cherubim	Gusion	Psalms 18:46
12	ההעיה (Hahaiah)	Cherubim	Sitri	Psalms 10:1
13	יזלאל (Iezalel)	Cherubim	Beleth	Psalms 98:4
14	מבהאל (Mebahel)	Cherubim	Leraje	Psalms 9:9
15	הריאל (Hariel)	Cherubim	Eligor	Psalms 94:22
16	הקמיה (Hakamiah)	Cherubim	Zepar	Psalms 88:1
17	לאויה (Loviah/Louiah)	Thrones	Botis	Psalms 8:9
18	כליאל (Caliel)	Thrones	Bathin	Psalms 35:24
19	לוויה (Levuiah/Leuuiah)	Thrones	Saleos	Psalms 40:1
20	פהליה (Pahaliah)	Thrones	Purson	Psalms 120:1–2
21	נלכאל (Nelchael)	Thrones	Morax	Psalms 31:14
22	יייאל (Ieiaiel)	Thrones	Ipos	Psalms 121:5
23	מלהאל (Melahel)	Thrones	Aim	Psalms 121:8
24	חהויה (Haiviah/Hahuiah)	Thrones	Naberus	Psalms 33:18
25	נתהיה (Nithhaiah)	Dominions	Glasya-Labolas	Psalms 9:1
26	האאיה (Haaiah)	Dominions	Bune	Psalms 119:145
27	ירתאל (Ierathel)	Dominions	Ronove	Psalms 140:1
28	שאהיה (Saeehiah)	Dominions	Berith	Psalms 71:12
29	רייאל (Reiaiel)	Dominions	Astaroth	Psalms 54:4
30	אומאל (Omael)	Dominions	Forneus	Psalms 71:5
31	לכבאל (Lecabel)	Dominions	Foras	Psalms 71:16
32	ושריה (Vasariah)	Dominions	Asmodeus	Psalms 33:4
33	יחויה (Lehuiah)	Powers	Gaap	Psalms 94:11
34	להחיה (Lehahiah)	Powers	Furfur	Psalms 131:3
35	כוקיה (Chavakiah)	Powers	Marchosias	Psalms 116:1
36	מנדאל (Manadel)	Powers	Stolas	Psalms 26:8
37	אניאל (Haniel)	Powers	Phenex	Psalms 80:3
38	חעמיה (Haamiah)	Powers	Halphas	Psalms 91:9
39	רהעאל (Rehael)	Powers	Malphas	Psalms 30:10
40	ייזאל (Ieiazel)	Powers	Raum	Psalms 88:14
41	הההאל (Hahahel)	Virtues	Focalor	Psalms 120:2
42	מיכאל (Mikael)	Virtues	Vepar	Psalms 121:7
43	ווליה (Veualiah)	Virtues	Sabnock	Psalms 88:13
44	ילהיה (Ielahiah)	Virtues	Shax	Psalms 119:108
45	סאליה (Sealiah)	Virtues	Vine	Psalms 94:18
46	עריאל (Ariel)	Virtues	Bifrons	Psalms 145:9
47	עשליה (Asaliah)	Virtues	Vual	Psalms 92:5
48	מיהאל (Mihael)	Virtues	Haagenti	Psalms 98:2
49	והואל (Vehuel)	Principalities	Crocell	Psalms 145:3
50	דניאל (Daniel)	Principalities	Furcas	Psalms 145:8
51	החשיה (Hahasiah)	Principalities	Balam	Psalms 104:31
52	עממיה (Imamiah)	Principalities	Allocer	Psalms 7:17
53	ננאאל (Nanael)	Principalities	Caim	Psalms 119:75
54	ניתאל (Nithael)	Principalities	Murmur	Psalms 103:19
55	מבהיה (Mebahaiah)	Principalities	Orobas	Psalms 102:12
56	פויאל (Poiel)	Principalities	Gremory	Psalms 145:14
57	נממיה (Nemamiah)	Archangels	Ose	Psalms 115:11
58	יילאל (Ieialel)	Archangels	Auns	Psalms 6:3
59	הרחאל (Harahel)	Archangels	Orias	Psalms 113:3
60	מצראל (Mizrael)	Archangels	Vapula	Psalms 145:17
61	ומבאל (Vmabel)	Archangels	Zagan	Psalms 113:2
62	יההאל (Iahhael)	Archangels	Valac	Psalms 119:159
63	ענואל (Anavel)	Archangels	Andras	Psalms 100:2
64	מחיאל (Mehiel)	Archangels	Flauros	Psalms 33:18
65	דמביה (Damabiah)	Angels	Andrealphus	Psalms 90:13
66	מנקאל (Mavakel)	Angels	Cimeries	Psalms 38:21
67	איעאל (Eiael)	Angels	Amduscias	Psalms 37:4
68	חבויה (Habuiah)	Angels	Belial	Psalms 106:1
69	ראהאל (Roehel)	Angels	Decarabia	Psalms 16:5
70	יבמיה (Yabamiah)	Angels	Seere	Genesis 1:1
71	הייאל (Haiaiel)	Angels	Dantalion	Psalms 109:30
72	מומיה (Mumiah)	Angels	Andromalius	Psalms 116:7

== In folklore, literature, and popular culture ==
Shem HaMephorash figures in the legend of the golem, an animated anthropomorphic being in Jewish folklore that was created entirely from inanimate matter (usually clay). The earthen figure was then animated by placing a piece of parchment with the name of God in its mouth. Jorge Luis Borges refers to this legend in his poem The Golem and in his essay The Golem. The Shem haMephorash also appears in Borges's stories Three versions of Judas and The Circular Ruins. The novel Unsong, a science fiction novel by Slate Star Codex blog writer Scott Alexander, also includes the Shem HaMephorash as a key plot point and answer to the problem to theodicy.

A contemporary book on Hermetic Qabalah which discusses the subject is Lon Milo DuQuette's The Chicken Qabalah of Rabbi Ben Clifford.

The 216-letter Shem HaMephorash is a prominent plot element in the 1998 film Pi.

== See also ==
- Magic and religion
