= Paimon =

Demon in the Ars Goetia

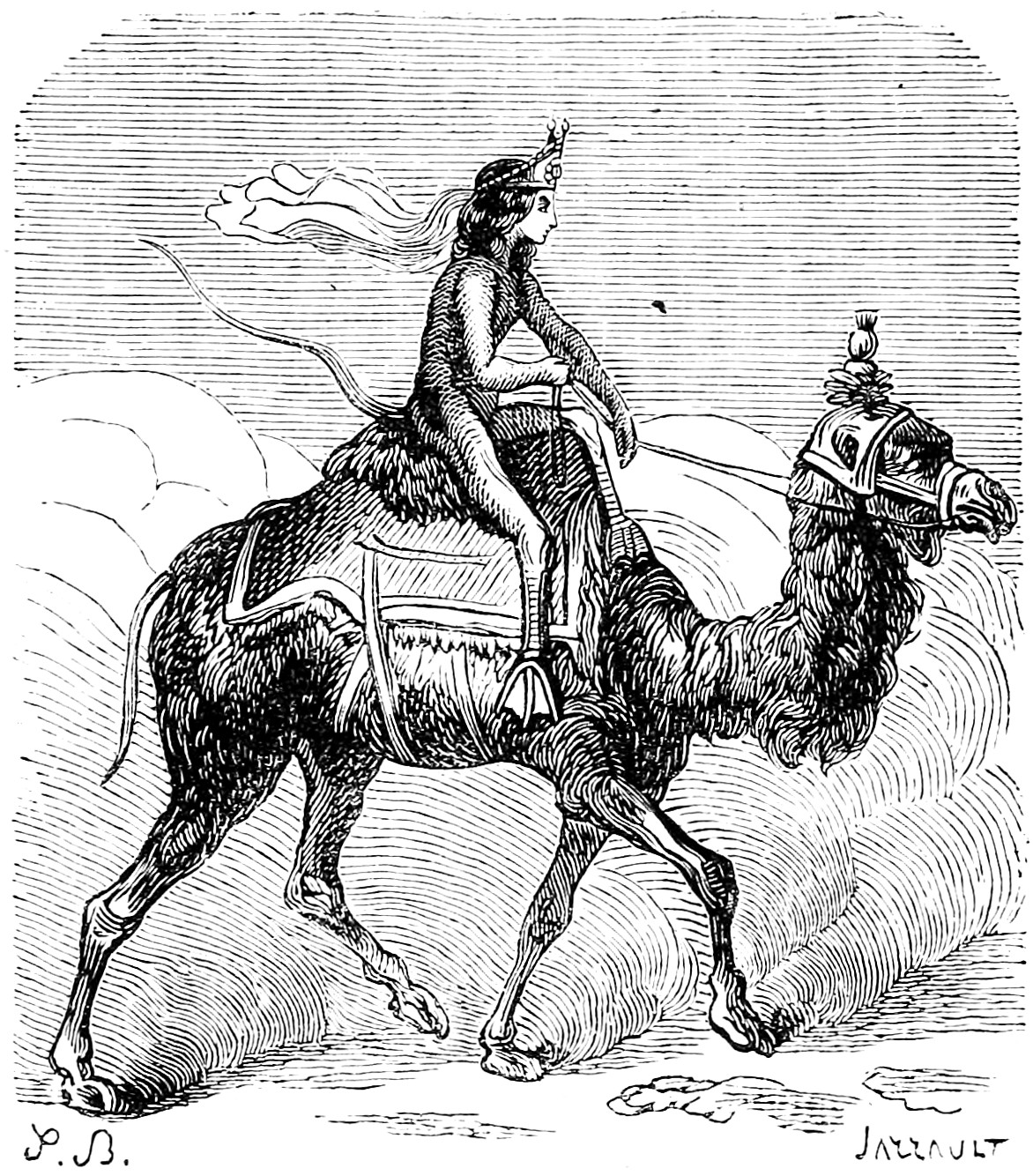
Paimon as depicted in Jacques Collin de Plancy's Dictionnaire Infernal, 1863 edition

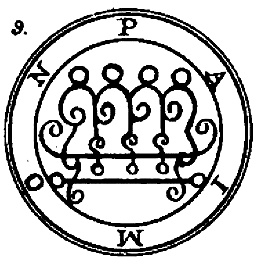
The Goetic sigil of King Paimon #1.

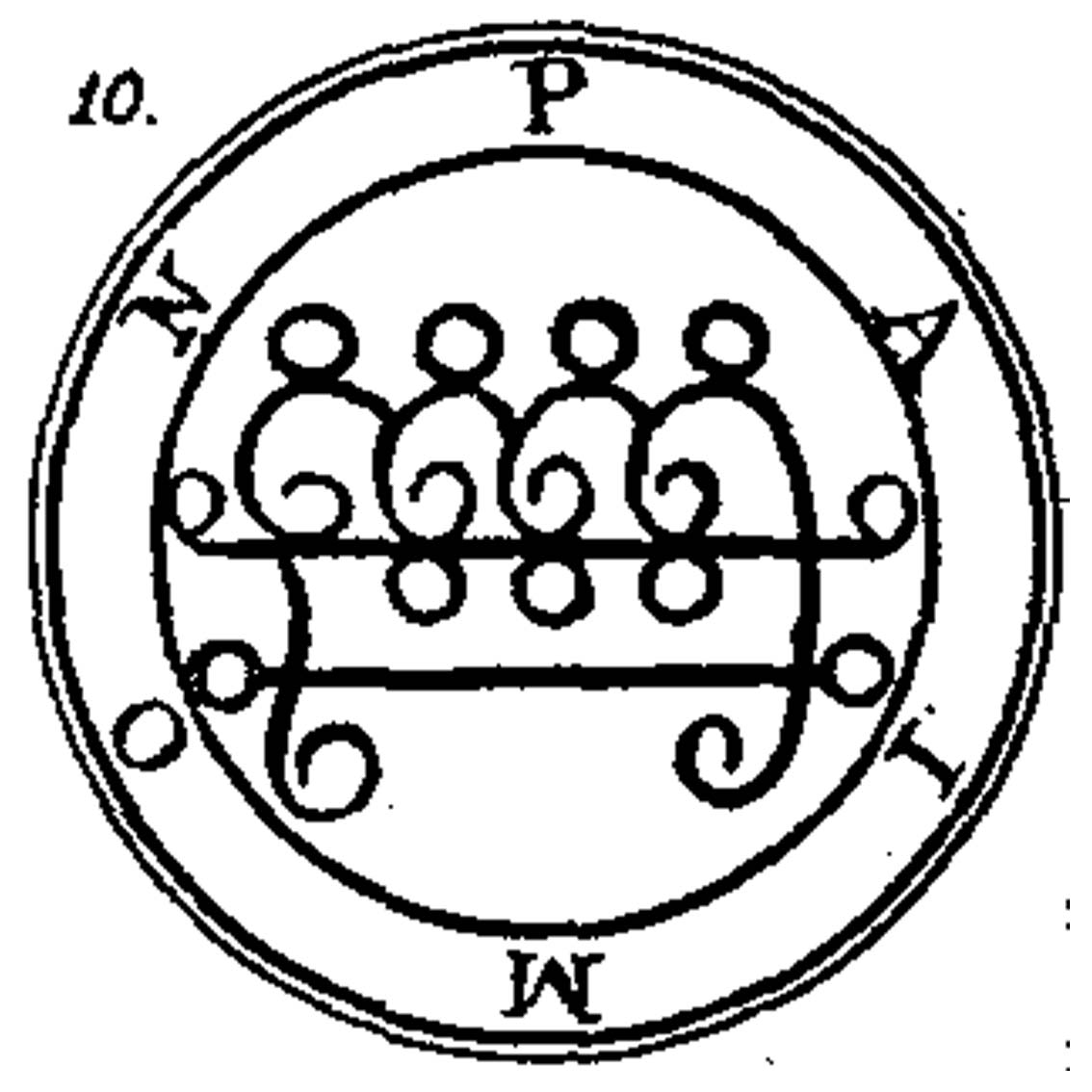
Another Goetic sigil of Paimon

Paimon or Paymon is a mythological spirit or demon in the Ars Goetia, and is also one of the 72 demons summoned by King Solomon. Paimon is named in various grimoires, notably in the Ars Goetia section of The Lesser Key of Solomon. Other early grimoires and demonological texts that mention him include Johann Weyer's Pseudomonarchia Daemonum, Jacques Collin de Plancy's Dictionnaire Infernal, the Livre des Esperitz (as "Poymon"), the Clavis Inferni, the Liber Officiorum Spirituum, The Book of Abramelin, and certain French editions of The Grimoire of Pope Honorius (as Bayemon); as well as British Library, Sloane MS 3824.

== Status and rank ==
The Goetia, Liber Officiorum Spirituum, and Weyer begin entries on King Paimon noting that he is quite obedient to Lucifer. Both the Pseudomonarchia Daemonum and the Liber Officiorum Spirituum note that he is more obedient to the will of Lucifer than any of the other kings.

King Paimon appears as the ninth spirit in the Ars Goetia, the 22nd spirit in the Pseudomonarchia Daemonum, and in the Dictionnaire Infernal. In the Liber Officiorum Spirituum, he is first listed as the sixth spirit and later as the third king.

The Goetia, Weyer, de Plancy, Liber Officiorum Spirituum, and Sloane MS 3824 rank Paimon as a king. Paimon is one of the nine demonic Kings in the Ars Goetia alongside Bael, Beleth, Purson, Asmoday, Vine, Balam, Zagan, and Belial. Additionally, in some early texts, Paimon is sometimes listed (but not in the Goetia or in the Pseudomonarchia), as one of the four Kings of the cardinal directions, commonly presented as Oriens (East), Amaymon (South), Egyn (or Ariton)(North), and with Paimon being the ruler of the West, but the rulers of the four cardinal directions are sometimes described differently. While Oriens is commonly associated with the East, some sources, particularly in the Grimoire of Pope Honorius, also name Magoa (or Magoth) as the ruler of the East, rather than Oriens. In addition to this, Magot (Magoth), Oriens, Paimon, Ariton, and Amaymon are also listed in the Book of Abramelin as among the Eight Dukes or Sub-Princes alongside Astaroth, Asmodi/Asmodee (Asmodeus), and Beelzebub (Belzebud). While the Livre des Esperitz does not explicitly rank Paimon as a king, it does, however, identify him to be one of the four principal cardinal direction spirits where he rules the west, as well as that the one compelling him should face towards the west. Sloane MS 3824 and the Grimoire of Pope Honorius specify that King Paimon is king of the west. Additionally, while some versions of the Ars Goetia consider that the conjurer should observe towards the West for calling upon King Paimon, Sloane 2731 specifically considers that he is to be observed towards the Northwest. In the Book of Abramelin (where his appearance is given no description), he is instead one of the eight dukes. It is said that he has no power over the lord above and would be demolished in any battle.

Paymon
Cardinal Kings or Rulers (traditional)	Oriens (also Urieus, Orience, Orient, etc.) - East. Paimon - West. Egyn (also Egin, Ariton, Egym, and Equi) - North. Amaymon (also Amoymon, Amaimon, Maymon, and Aymoymon) - South. This presentation of the four cardinal demon kings or rulers is common, featured in occult texts such as the Livre des Esperitz, the Liber Officiorum Spirituum, the Clavis Inferni, and Sloane MS 3824. In some cases, each are also paired or can be constrained by each of the four principal angels, being Michael (Oriens), Raphael (Paimon), Gabriel (Amaymon), and Uriel (Egyn).
The Grimoire of Pope Honorius	Magoa (also Magoth or Magot) - East. Bayemon - West. Egym - South. Amaymon - North.
Goetia	One of the Nine Kings in the Goetic Hierarchy as mentioned earlier. Teaches arts, sciences, secrets, and anything that the conjurer desires to know. Gives dignities and good familiars, and can be invoked to bind others.

== Relationship to hierarchy ==
The Goetia, Weyer, and de Plancy warn that if King Paimon appears alone, a sacrifice must be made to summon Lebal (sometimes called Bebal, Baball, Beball, or Labal), the most devoted to Lucifer, and Abalam (or Abalim), two kings who serve under him but do not always accompany him. These three sources state that he rules 200 legions of spirits, some of which are of the order of Angels and the rest being Powers. The Livre des Esperitz, on the other hand, credits him with just 25 legions of spirits. Sloane MS 3824 mentions him as employing a "bishop" named Sperion, among other spirits.

Critical editions of the Lesser Key of Solomon list him as a former Dominion. Weyer notes a confusion over whether he was a former Dominion or Cherub. According to Thomas Rudd, King Paimon is opposed by the Shem HaMephorash angel Haziel.

== Appearance ==
In the Goetia, Weyer, de Plancy, Livre des Esperitz, Liber Officiorum Spirituum, he is described as a man riding a dromedary, preceded by men playing loud music (particularly trumpets), as well as cymbals. Sloane MS 3824 describes the camel as crowned, while the rest describe Paimon himself as crowned. The Goetia itself makes no mention of Paimon's face, while the rest describe him as having a beautiful face but still refer to him as male.

== Etymology ==
The etymology of his name as found in the etymology notes section of the Book of the Sacred Magic of Abramelin the Mage by Samuel Liddell MacGregor Mathers suggests that it might come from the Hebrew word Paamon or “POMN” (פַּעֲמֹן), meaning a “tinkling sound or small bell.” MacGregor Mathers also explains that the word “Paamon” is employed in certain biblical passages, particularly Exodus 28:33, 28:34, and 39:25 - These Exodus verses describe the creation of the High Priest’s garments, specifically the robe, and the purpose of bells and pomegranates attached to it.

Other Spellings of his name include Paymonia, Paimonia, Païmon, Bayemont, and Baymon.

== Possession ==
Sloane MS 3824 and the Liber Officiorum Spirituum describe him as having a "Hoarse Voice", and those works, Weyer, and the Goetia note that he must be commanded to speak, with the Liber Officiorum Spirituum specifying that King Paimon will speak in his native language until commanded to converse in the summoner's own language.

== Powers ==
The Goetia, Weyer, Livre des Esperitz, and the Liber Officiorum Spirituum all describe him as teaching science and answering other questions. The Goetia and Weyer specify that his knowledge includes all arts and "secret things" [sic], such as knowledge regarding the Earth, its waters, and the winds. The Livre des Esperitz and the Liber Officiorum Spirituum broaden this to truthfully answering all questions asked of him, with the former source also claiming that he can reveal hidden treasures and the latter highlighting that he knows all the affairs of the world. The Goetia, Weyer, and the Livre des Esperitz also claim he has the ability to bestow dignities and lordships. The Goetia and Weyer credited him with granting familiars (who are likewise good at teaching). The Liber Officiorum Spirituum uniquely gives him command over fish. Sloane MS 3824 mentions Paimon in "An Experiment to Cause a Thief to Return".

In Abramelin, King Paimon's powers include knowledge of past and future events, clearing up doubts, making spirits appear, creating visions, acquiring and dismissing servant spirits, reanimating the dead for several years, flight, remaining underwater indefinitely, and general abilities to "make all kinds of things" and "all sorts of people and armor appear" at the behest of the magician.

== Legacy ==
King Paimon is the primary antagonist in Ari Aster's 2018 film, Hereditary. A version of the Sigil of Paimon can be seen multiple times within the film, along with many other signs indicating his presence.

Also he is the main antagonist and ruler of the Hell Dimension that the spaceship Event Horizon jumps into that kills the first crew and infects the ship prior to the opening of the movie Event Horizon (as seen in the comic Event Horizon Dark Descent).

== Bibliography ==
- Ashmole, Elias (2009). Rankine, David (ed.). The Book of Treasure Spirits. Avalonia Books. ISBN 978-1-905297-27-6.
- Banner, James, ed. (1999). The Grimoire of Pope Honorius. Translated by Ch'ien, Kineta. Seattle, Washington: Trident Books. ISBN 1879000091.
- Boudet, Jean-Patrice (2003). "Les who's who démonologiques de la Renaissance et leurs ancêtres médiévaux". Médiévales. Langues, Textes, Histoire. Médiévales (in French). 44 (44). Revues.org: 117–140. doi:10.4000/medievales.1019.
- O'Donoghue, Anne (2023). Meditations on King Paimon: Classical and Spiritual Ramblings on Demon King of the West (first ed.). Seattle, Washington: Amazon Publishing. pp. 27–51. ISBN 979-8397699655.
- Peterson, Joseph H., ed. (2001). Lemegeton Clavicula Salomonis: The Lesser Key of Solomon, Detailing the Ceremonial Art of Commanding Spirits Both Good and Evil. Maine: Weiser Books. ISBN 1-57863-220-X.
- Peterson, Joseph H., ed. (2007). Grimoirium Verum. CreateSpace Independent Publishing. ISBN 978-1434811165.
- de Plancy, Jacques Collin (1853). Dictionnaire infernal (in French). Paris: Sagnier et Bray.
- Porter, John (2011). Campbell, Colin D. (ed.). A Book of the Office of Spirits. Translated by Hockley, Frederick. Teitan Press. ISBN 978-0933429253.
- Porter, John; Weston, John (2015). Harms, Daniel; Clark, James R.; Peterson, Joseph H. (eds.). The Book of Oberon: A Sourcebook for Elizabethan Magic (first ed.). Llewellyn Publications. ISBN 978-0-7387-4334-9.
- Rudd, Thomas (2007). Skinner, Stephen; Rankine, David (eds.). The Goetia of Dr Rudd. Golden Hoard Press. ISBN 978-0738723556.
- Runyon, Carroll "Poke" (1996). The Book of Solomon's Magick. Church of Hermetic Sciences, Incorporated. ISBN 096548811X.
- Weyer, Johann (2000). Peterson, Joseph H. (ed.). Pseudomonarchia Daemonum (Liber officiorum spirituum). Twilit Grotto: Esoteric Archives.
- von Worms, Abraham (2006). Dehn, Georg (ed.). The Book of Abramelin: A New Translation. Translated by Guth, Steven. Lake Worth, Florida: Ibis Press. ISBN 978-0-89254-127-0.
