= Liber Officiorum Spirituum =

Possible/lost demonological grimoire

Liber Officiorum Spirituum (English: The Book of the Office of Spirits) was a goetic grimoire and a major source for Johann Weyer's Pseudomonarchia Daemonum and the Ars Goetia. The original work (if it is a single work) has not been located, but some derived texts bearing the title have been found, some in the Sloane manuscripts, some in the Folger Shakespeare Library. Each version bears many similarities to each other and to the Pseudomonarchia Daemonum and the Ars Goetia, though they are far from identical.

== History ==
Johannes Trithemius mentions two separate works (Liber quoque Officiorum, and De Officiis Spirituum), indicating that the text may have branched off by his time. Weyer, in his Pseudomonarchia Daemonum, lists his source as Liber officiorum spirituum. Thomas Rudd titles his copy of the Ars Goetia as Liber Malorum Spirituum.

The most detailed version is a direct but poor translation from English to Latin. This version was either copied or translated by Englishman John Porter in 1583. This version was owned by artist Richard Cosway. Upon his death in the 1820s, it passed hands to a bookshop owned by John Denley, bought by an occultist named George W. Graham on behalf of a Magical organization known as "the Society of the Mercurii." In the hands of the Mercurii, it came into the possession of Robert Cross Smith in 1822, who had John Palmer copy it. With Smith's death in 1832, the copy was passed on to Frederick Hockley. At some later date, Hockley acquired the first half of Porter's original manuscript, and attempted to compile both Porter's and Palmer's versions into a single version.

Sloane MS 3824 (from the mid-seventeenth century) features a number of elements from the Book of the Office of Spirits and is an early form of the Lemegeton. MS 3853 is titled The Office of Spirits, starts off nearly identical to more complete Porter version.

Hockley's version, and some portions of the other known versions, were published in 2011 by Teitan Press as A Book of the Office of Spirits.

The manuscript Hockley copied from was translated and edited by Daniel Harms and Joseph Peterson in 2015 as The Book of Oberon.

== Contents ==
The manuscript in the Folger Shakespeare library is preceded by sundry materials lifted from Arbatel de magia veterum (amazingly only two years after its publication), the Enchiridion of Pope Leo III, and Sefer Raziel HaMalakh, and followed with a version of the Key of Solomon. The section Officium de spirittibus [sic] begins describing "the three devils" (Lucifer, Ba'el, and Satan), and the four kings of the air (Orience over the east, Paymon the west, Egine the north, and Amaymon the south), and the means of calling them. It then lists an additional seventy-five demons, for a total of eighty-two. Many of the demons are comparable to those in the Lesser Key of Solomon.

The next to last entry, "Oberyon," shifts the focus from demons to fairies. After the eighty-one demons, the book details Mycob (wife of Oberyon) and their seven daughters. It then repeats the four kings of the air, listing twelve demons under each of them. After this, it begins describing the spirits of the days of the week and the incenses and conjurations needed to summon them, lifting material from The Sworn Book of Honorius and Heinrich Cornelius Agrippa's Three Books of Occult Philosophy. It follows with a list of Greek and Roman gods, a note about which spirits rule hell, and an entry to summon spirits "that make books and write books," before giving instructions on how to summon the angel over each day of the week, including instructions for magic circles, consecrations, use of holy water and exorcisms of fire. This portion uses elements of scripture, Sarum Missal, the Key of Solomon, Arbatel, Honorius, Agrippa, Raziel, and what would become the Tridentine Mass. It also shares some prayers found in the Munich Manual of Demonic Magic.

After this is a section on necromancy, involving magic circles and calling upon the aforementioned four kings, names of God, and different saints to constrain a called spirit. The instructions on necromancy are followed by a means of finding hidden treasure that is similar to the method used by Edward Kelley, with spells to bind the spirit guarding the treasure. Following this is yet another means of summoning King Egin, and then similar instructions to summon a spirit named Baron, and a spell named "an experiment of Rome," and spells to find lost items, steal items, see spirits (involving the invocation of King Arthur), and enchanting hazel rods.

These spells are interrupted by a short treatise on the role of angels, demons, and magic in theodicy, before continuing with more spells to see spirits, a collection of talismans, and a selection of names of God, planetary seals and spirits, geomantic figures, fumigations, and notes on the Lunar mansions openly taken from Agrippa. Following this are more instructions on ritual magic, and more spells to acquire unspecified desired items, and identify thieves. The additional spirits in this section include: Bilgal, Annabath, Ascariell, Satan, Baron, Romulon, Mosacus, and Orobas. The instructions on summoning spirits continue with Oberyon and his followers: Storax, Carmelyon, Severion, Caberyon, Aozol, Restun, Ramalath, Zaseres, Castriel, Saziel, and Ydial.

Hockley's manuscript starts with an initial list of eighty demons (with several duplicates), takes a small break to detail several fairies, and then lists four groups of twelve demons, most repeating spirits from the first eighty with various discrepancies. Sloane 3853 merely lists ten demons who also appear in Hockley's manuscript, and then names the demon kings of the north, south, east, and west (Leraje, Aim, Bune, and Paymon, respectively), generic spirits under them, and non-descript spirits to obtain love or treasure. Cherberus/Naberius appears with two other individual but sparsely detailed spirits (the first two over rhetoric and love, respectively, the last having no noted duties). Sloane 3824 lists different unsorted magical procedures, dropping names of spirits from the Book of Spirits in passing, rarely with explanation.

=== Demons shared by this and other grimoires ===
- Agaros,
- Allogor or Algor (also in Sloane 3853)
- Amaymon,
- Amon,
- Asmoday,
- Astaroth,
- Baall,
- Barbaryes, Barbates, or Barbares (separate duplicate entries within the first eighty demons), later Barbais
- Beelzebub,
- Beliall
- Berith,
- Byleth, or Bileth
- Caleos,
- Cherberus (in Sloane 3853),
- Coolor (also Doolas, duplicate entry),
- Corsone, or Fersone
- Darbas or Carbas, later Barbas or Corbas
- Egine, Egin, or Egyn
- Forcase, also Partas
- Gemon or Gemyem
- Gloolas or Glolas (in Sloane 3853)
- Goorax
- Hanar,
- Lucifer,
- Mallapar, or Mallapas
- Orience or Oriens,
- Oze
- Paymon,
- Ryall
- Satan,
- Saygane or Laygayne, or Zagayne
- Semper
- Usagoo, Vsagoo, or (with a different description) Vsago

=== Fairies ===
Obeyryon or Oberyon, an assistant spirit named Bilgall, Mycob or Myeob, and their seven daughters are listed as fairies. Obeyryon is listed as a king, who teaches physics, mineral and plant lore, as well as making men invisible, revealing hidden treasures and how to acquire them, and revealing past, present, and future events. Bilgall appears as a fire-breathing human-headed ox, though his duties are not detailed. Myeob is described as a crowned green-clad queen. Like her husband, she makes people invisible and reveals secrets about rocks, metals, and plants; in addition to medicine and "the truth." The daughters, like their parents, teach physics and herbal knowledge, and give out rings of invisibility.

Oberon and "Mycob" (a corruption of the already corrupt Myeob) also appear in several 16th and 17th century manuscripts, such as the 1580 Folger MS Vb 25 and a 1649 portion of Sloane MS 3824, reflecting a popular trend in English occultism at the time.
