= Bifrons (disambiguation) =

Bifrons is Latin for "two-faced" and may refer to:

== Geography ==
- Bifrons, an estate (hence also Bifrons Hill, Bifrons Road) in Patrixbourne, Kent, England
- Bifrons (age), a subdivision of the Jurassic Lias Group named after the estate

== Mythology ==
- Janus, the god of beginnings and transitions in ancient Roman religion and mythology
- Bifrons (demon), in demonology, a demon, Earl of Hell, with at least six legions of demons under his command
- Bifrons (Dungeons & Dragons), a Duke of Hell in the service of Mephistopheles, in the Dungeons & Dragons roleplaying game
