= Vine (demon) =

Demon that is king and earl of hell

Vine is a demon listed in demonological grimoires such the Lesser Key of Solomon (Note: As the forty-fifth spirit.) (including Thomas Rudd's version) Johann Weyer's Pseudomonarchia Daemonum, (Note: As the forty-fourth spirit) and Jacques Collin de Plancy's Dictionnaire Infernal.

These texts rank Vine as both a king and an earl, describing him as a lion riding a black horse and carrying a viper. They ascribe to him the power to build towers, destroy walls, disturb seas, and furthermore answer questions on secrets, witches, and events past, present, and future.

Vine may be derived from or otherwise connected to the spirit "Royne" in the Liber Officiorum Spirituum, who is described only as an earl appearing like a lion-faced soldier (still riding a black horse and carrying a snake). Royne is given the power to build not only towers but houses, and can only answer questions on treasures or secrets but also has love magic, the ability to destroy enemies and consecrate objects (books especially).

According to Rudd, Vine is opposed by the Shemhamphorasch angel Sealiah.

== Popular culture ==
- Vine is portrayed as a first-year student attending the Babyls demon school in the Japanese anime and manga series Welcome to Demon School! Iruma-kun.
- Vine apears under the name Vinea as main villain of Netflix video game, set in The Conjuring Universe, titled "The Conjuring: Unspoken".
