= Hanar =

Hanar may refer to:

- Amy (demon), a demon described in demonological grimoires
- a non-playable race in the Mass Effect video game series
