= Semiphoras and Schemhamphorash =

Jewish occult text

Semiphoras and Schemhamphorash (Semiphoras und Schemhamphoras) is the title of an occult or magic text of Jewish provenance, published in German by Andreas Luppius in 1686. It was based on the earlier Latin text, Liber Semiphoras (aka Semamphoras, Semyforas) attributed to Solomon, which Luppius augmented heavily with passages from Agrippa's De occulta philosophia and other sources.

== Sources used ==
It is heavily indebted to Sepher ha-Razim through its Latin versions, Liber Sepher Razielis idest Liber Secretorum seu Liber Salomonis, and seemingly replaced the more explicitly magical text Liber magice in the Alphonsine Razielis.

This book was attested in 1260 by Roger Bacon, and mentioned by the Latin Liber Razielis (ms VRL 1300 2nd half of 14th ce, 36v).

== Manuscripts ==
Manuscripts include Kassel, Univ. Bibl., 4° astron (dated 1346, L.1.f.20), Halle ULB 14-B-36, fols. 244-249 (especially fol. 246r – late 15th ce hand), 346, and 377v (16th ce hand). Also CLM 51 (1487, fols. 120v-123v), Archivio di Stato di Venezia Sant'Uffizio, b.93 titled Occultissimorum Liber (early 17th ce, pp. 1-44), Cornell 4600 Bd. ms. 150 pp. 1-4. British Library Sloane ms. 3846 in English (1564, fol. 155r-v), Sloane ms. 3826, and Sloane ms. 3318 (17th ce, fols. 119v-120r).

== Availability of the German and English translations ==
E.M. Butler noted that the German translation appeared in J. C. Horst, Zauberbibliothek (Mainz, 1821-6, 6 vols. vol 3. and 4). The German text was later published by Johann Scheible in his Das Kloster, (Stuttgart and Leipzig, 1846. 12 vols. Vol. 3), and later included in his edition of the so-called Das sechste und siebente Buch Mosis, Achtente, sehr vermehrte Auflage, New York: Wm. Radde, 1865. An English translation based on Luppius is included in Sixth and Seventh Books of Moses Peterson 2008 pp. 141-168.

== Appearances in lists of grimoires ==
The title was also mentioned among grimoires by authors such as Johannes Hartlieb.

== Meaning of the title ==
The title seems to be a Latinization of the Kabbalistic term Shem HaMephorash, meaning "the explicit name" of God, as opposed to the many descriptive names such as "the Almighty."

== Parallels to the Liber Salomonis ==
"The Seven Semiphoras of Adam" and "The Seven Semiphoras of Moses" closely match book 7 of the Liber Salomonis.

== Impact ==
Trithemius mentions it as one of his sources for his Steganographia. It was also drawn on heavily by Agrippa in his book On Occult Philosophy on which see the new edition by V. Perrone Compagni.

== See also ==
- Arbatel de magia veterum
- Bahir
- Sefer HaRazim
- Sefer Raziel HaMalakh
- Renaissance magic
- The Lesser Key of Solomon
