= Sefer Raziel HaMalakh =

Grimoire of practical Kabbalah

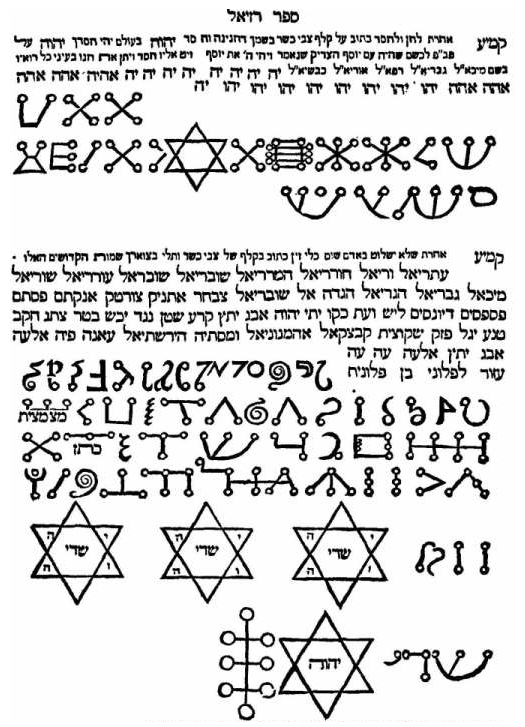
Page 44b in the 1701 edition of Sefer Raziel HaMalakh, featuring various magical sigils (or סגולות, seguloth, in Hebrew).

Sefer Raziel HaMalakh (Hebrew: ספר רזיאל המלאך, "the book of Raziel the angel") is a grimoire of Practical Kabbalah from the Middle Ages written primarily in Hebrew and Aramaic. The version of the book published in 1701 is the most known version. Liber Razielis Archangeli, its 13th-century Latin translation produced under Alfonso X of Castile, also survives.

== Textual history ==
Like other obscure ancient texts such as the Bahir and Sefer Yetzirah, Sefer HaRaziel has been extant in a number of versions. The book cannot be shown to predate the 13th century, but may in parts date back to late antiquity insofar as its title is mentioned in another magical work of late antiquity: The Sword of Moses.

The book claims to have been revealed to Adam by the angel Raziel. Critical historians regard it as a medieval work, most probably originating among the Ashkenazi Hasidim, as citations reliant on the main body content of the work as we receive it begin to appear only in the 12th century. At least one section was available to Ibn Ezra before 1153, when he finished his commentary to Exodus. The likely compiler of the medieval version is Eleazar of Worms, as Sefer Galei Razia, which developed into what we have now as Sefer Raziel, including more writings written by people of various theological opinions. According to Jacob Emden, it was compiled by Abraham Abulafia.

== Contents ==
Sefer Raziel HaMalakh draws heavily on Sefer Yetzirah and Sefer HaRazim "Book of Secrets". There are multiple manuscript versions, containing up to seven tractates. The printed version of Sefer Raziel is divided into five books, some of it in the form of a mystical midrash on Creation. It features an elaborate angelology, magical uses of the zodiac, gematria, names of God, protective spells, and a method of writing magical healing amulets.

Book six of the Liber Razielis, the latin version of the book, is based on Sefer haRazim, with various additions, including the "Prayer of Adam" of Sefer Adam.

The book became notorious in German Renaissance magic, named together with Picatrix as among the most abominable works of necromancy by Johannes Hartlieb. The prayer of Adam is paraphrased by Nicholas of Cusa in two sermons (Sermo I, 4, 16.25; Sermo XX, 8, 10-13) and further made use of by Johann Reuchlin in his De Arte Cabalistica. Konrad Bollstatter in the 15th century also shows awareness of the Latin version of the "Prayer of Adam" an interpolation in Cgm 252, although he replaces Raziel with Raphael and Seth with Sem.

== Philosophical and theological themes ==
Although usually classified as a work of practical Kabbalah, Sefer Raziel HaMalakh also reflects broader medieval Jewish ideas about revelation, language, cosmology and the transmission of esoteric knowledge. The text presents knowledge as something disclosed through angelic mediation rather than obtained only through ordinary human reasoning. Its frame narrative, in which Raziel reveals divine secrets to Adam after the expulsion from Eden, casts esoteric knowledge as both a consolation after the Fall and a means of restoring some measure of access to the hidden order of creation.

The work is also significant for the way it combines cosmology with practical operations. Its materials include angelology, divine and angelic names, astrology, gematria, protective spells and amulets, making it a text in which knowledge of the structure of the cosmos is closely linked to ritual use. In this respect, Sefer Raziel illustrates a recurrent feature of practical Kabbalah: the assumption that hidden correspondences among language, angels, planets, divine names and the created world could be known and, under certain conditions, used.

The work treats Hebrew letters, divine names and angelic names not simply as symbols, but as elements of a linguistic order through which creation, protection and ritual action are mediated.

=== Language, letters and divine names ===
A major philosophical theme of Sefer Raziel is the power of sacred language. The text draws on traditions associated with Sefer Yetzirah, in which the Hebrew letters and the ten sefirot are treated as principles of cosmic formation. In Sefer Raziel, this linguistic cosmology becomes practical: combinations of letters, divine names, angelic names and gematria are treated as means by which hidden aspects of the created order may be addressed or activated.

This view gives the Hebrew alphabet and divine names a status beyond ordinary communication. Names do not merely refer to divine or angelic powers; within the logic of the text, they are part of the structure by which spiritual and cosmic forces are organized. The book's use of names, seals and written formulae therefore reflects a broader magical-kabbalistic theory of signs, in which writing, speech and numerical equivalence can mediate between human action and the divine order.

=== Tree of Knowledge ===
Adam, in his prayer to God, apologized for listening to his wife Eve, who was deceived by the snake into eating from the Tree of Knowledge. According to the Book of Raziel, God sent the highest of the angels, Raziel, to teach Adam the spiritual laws of nature and life on Earth, including the knowledge of the planets, stars and the spiritual laws of creation.

The angel Raziel also taught Adam the knowledge of the power of speech, the power of thoughts and the power of a person's soul within the confines of the physical body and this physical world, basically teaching the knowledge with which one can harmonize physical and spiritual existence in this physical world.

The angel Raziel teaches the power of speech, the energy contained within the 22 letters of the Hebrew alphabet, their combinations and meanings of names.

=== Adam and Abraham ===
According to Jewish traditions, the angel Raziel was sent to Earth to teach Adam as he prayed for guidance after the fall, and then returned to teach Abraham spiritual knowledge and laws because he had an elevated soul. The Book of Raziel explains everything from astrology to how the creative life energy starts with a thought from the spiritual realms, prior to manifestation as speech and action in this physical world. The eternal divine creative life energy of this earth is love, the book explains the spiritual laws of birth, death, reincarnation of the soul, and many spiritual laws of "change".

== Heptameron ==
The Heptameron, ascribed to Petrus de Apono, is based on the Book of Raziel.

=== Practical and speculative Kabbalah ===
Sefer Raziel is commonly associated with practical Kabbalah rather than with purely speculative Kabbalah. Whereas speculative Kabbalah is primarily concerned with the nature of God, creation, the sefirot and contemplative interpretation, practical Kabbalah concerns ritual uses of divine names, amulets, incantations and other operations. Sefer Raziel is significant because it combines both dimensions: it preserves cosmological and mystical traditions while presenting them in forms intended for protection, healing, divination or ritual efficacy.

== Adamic revelation tradition ==
The book's frame narrative belongs to a broader tradition of Adamic revelation, in which primordial knowledge is disclosed to Adam after the Fall. In Sefer Raziel, Adam's repentance after expulsion from Eden is followed by the appearance of the angel Raziel, who reveals a book of divine secrets. This narrative gives the work an origin at the beginning of human history and portrays esoteric knowledge as a partial remedy for the rupture caused by the loss of Eden.

The Adamic frame also helps explain the work's encyclopedic character. Because the knowledge is presented as primordial, the book can gather cosmology, angelology, astrology, divine names, amulets and ritual instructions into a single revealed corpus.

== Editions ==
- רזיאל המלאך. Amsterdam (1701) Chabad-Lubavitch Library. Full-text PDF version, in Hebrew, from HebrewBooks.org
- Steve Savedow (trans.), Sepher Rezial Hemelach: The Book of the Angel Rezial, Red Wheel/Weiser (2000), ISBN 978-1-57863-193-3.
- The Book of the Angel Raziel. Volume I / Transl. from Hebrew and Aramaic and comm. by E. V. Kuzmin; editorship and foreword by B. K. Dvinyaninov. — St. Petersburg: Academy Of Culture's Research, 2020. — 264 pp.: illustrated, — (Code Grimoire Series). ISBN 978-5-6045100-3-2 (на русском языке)
- The Book of the Angel Raziel. Volume II / Transl. from Hebrew and Aramaic, afterword and comm. by E. V. Kuzmin; editorship and foreword by B. K. Dvinyaninov. — St. Petersburg: Academy Of Culture’s Research, 2021. — 512 pp.: illustrated, — (Code Grimoire Series). ISBN 978-5-6045100-4-9 (на русском языке)

== See also ==
- Hebrew astronomy
- Jewish astrology
- Jewish views on astrology
- Primary texts of Kabbalah
- Semiphoras and Schemhamphorash
- Sefer HaRazim
