= Gamigin =

Goetic demon

Seal of Gamigin (Ars Goetia)

Gamigin is a demon described in demonological grimoires such as The Lesser Key of Solomon (the fourth Goetic demon; referred to in the Crowley/Mathers edition as Samigina) and Johann Weyer's Pseudomonarchia Daemonum (the forty-sixth; referred to as Gamygyn).

Both works describe him as a marquis who initially takes the form of a small horse before transforming into a hoarse-voiced human. The Lesser Key of Solomon merely leaves his duties at teaching liberal arts and giving accounts of souls that died in sin.

According to Rudd, Gamigin is opposed by the Shemhamphorasch angel Ieuiah. The Pseudomonarchia Daemonum (circa first half of 17th-century), Thomas Rudd's variant of the Ars Goetia, and the Dictionnaire Infernal (1818) go into more detail than the Lesser Key, with Gamigin forcing the souls of those who drowned into "airy bodies" to answer questions in either, with Weyer and de Plancy further claiming that Gamigan can do likewise for souls "which dwell in purgatorie (which is called Cartagra, that is, affliction of soules)".

== See also ==
- The Lesser Key of Solomon
