= Leraie =

Goetic demon

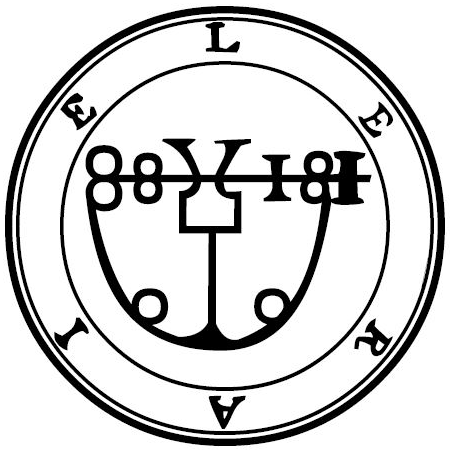
Leraie's sigil in Ars Goetia

Leraie is a demon mentioned in demonological grimoires. He appears in the Lesser Key of Solomon, Johann Weyer's Pseudomonarchia Daemonum, and Jacques Collin de Plancy's Dictionnaire Infernal. He is a mighty Great Marquis of Hell who has thirty-three legions of Demons under his power. He is said to cause great battles and disputes, and makes gangrene wounds caused by arrows. He can make a lover come to him, and also send them away. He is depicted as a gallant and handsome archer clad in green, carrying a bow and quiver. Leraie has been referred to by numerous other names in various texts, including Leraje, Loray, Oray, and Leriac.

== Description ==
Leraie is described as an archer who starts battles and putrefies arrow-wounds.

The Lesser Key additionally notes that he wears green while Weyer (and so De Plancy) attribute him with the power of driving away mobs.

== Legions and standing ==
Leraie is the fourteenth spirit in the Lesser Key of Solomon (in some versions as Leraje, and in Rudd's variant as Leriac), the thirteenth spirit in the Pseudomonarchia Daemonum (as Loray or Oray), and appears as Oray in the Dictionnaire Infernal.

In the Grand Grimoire, Leraie (as Loray or Zoray) is listed as a subordinate of Sargatanas. All other sources claim he rules 30 legions of spirits.

According to Rudd, Leraie is opposed by the Shemhamphorasch angel Mehahel.
