= Ana BeKoach =

Jewish prayer composed by Rabbi Nechunya ben Hakanah

Ana BeKoach (Hebrew: אנא בכח, We beg you! With your strength) is a medieval Jewish piyyut (liturgical poem) called by its incipit. This piyyut, the acronym of which is said to be a 42-letter name of God, (Note: Obscuring the 7 Holy Names This article is only a general overview. It may not mention all differences between nusachim or quote all related Halacha.: / English / Translit. / Hebrew; Why obscure?: To observe prohibition against writing HaShem's names where they may be destroyed (Deuteronomy 12:3–4), incl. in printed electronic media: 4-letter name / HaShem / HaShem / יְיָ / השם; 12-, 42-, 72-letter names / Only 3-letter acronyms in grey with letters replaced by "∞" and warnings; Ado-ai (for 4-letter) / HaShem / HaShem / יְיָ / השם; Ado-ai (itself) / L-rd / Ado-ai / אֲדֹ-י; Kel / G-d / Kel / קֵל; Elokim / G-d / Elokim / אֱלֹקִים; Ekyeh / Ekyeh / Ekyeh / אֶֽקְיֶ֑ה; Shakkai / Alm-ghty / Shakkai / שַׁקַי֙; Tzvakot / H-sts / Tzvakot / צְבָאקֹת; Exceptions: Words only containing part of the 4-letter name, or Kel used in personal names (Joel / Yoel / יואל)) is recited daily by those Jewish communities which include a greatly expanded version of Korbanot in Shacharit and more widely as part of Kabbalat Shabbat. Some also recite it as part of Bedtime Shema or during the Omer.

== History ==
The exact wording of the piyyut differs widely between manuscripts, with smaller variations in the resulting acronym. Hayy ben Sherira (d. 1038), the first scholar to mention its 42-letter acronym, did not know of any piyyut and writes that the name was only passed down among the Babylonian geonim. By contrast, Rashi and Maimonides write that the 42-letter name is lost.

According to Shlomo ibn Aderet, "The letters [of the 42-letter name] differ between our [Sephardic] tradition and that of the Ashkenazic masters, but the baqasha of Nehunya ben HaKanah (c. 100 CE) agrees with our version." Many different piyyutim based on the 42-letter acronym were popular at the time, all obviously the work of medieval poets. According to Moshe Hallamish, the first piyyut to largely resemble the modern form of Ana BeKoach was recorded by Jacob of Segovia (13th century), who probably learned it from the Ashkenazi Hasidim, who had been composing piyyutim around the 42-letter name since the early 12th century.

== Usage ==
The piyyut is included in some siddurim in the Parashat Korbanot reading during Shacharit as well as during Kabbalat Shabbat before Lekha Dodi. It is also recited in some communities after each of the 49 daily Omer countings, both in its full form and intertwined in commentary verses included after the count for each day.

Parts of the services where Ana BeKoach is recited by orthodox Jewish communities
Siddur (Nusach)	Used by	Weekday Shacharit	Kabbalat Shabbat	Sephirat Ha'Omer
Siddur Ashkenaz (Nusach Ashkenaz)	Ashkenazi	At the end of the introductory prayers as part of the Korbanot (sacrifices) recital, before the start of Pesukei Dezimra.	After the opening Psalms Ps 95–99, 29, and before Lekha Dodi.	After counting the Omer towards the end of Maariv
Siddur Edot HaMizrach (Nusach Sefard)	Sephardi (majority); Mizrahi (all)	At the end of the introductory prayers as part of the Korbanot (sacrifices) recital, before the start of Pesukei Dezimra.	After the opening Psalms Ps 95–100, 29, and before Lekha Dodi. (Note: Siddur Edot HaMisrach and Siddur Sefard exclude Yedid Nefesh but include Ps 100)	After counting the Omer and reciting Psalm 67 towards the end of Maariv. After each counting section these siddurim include verses for contemplation put together with the word from Ana BeKoach for each Omer day, extracts from Psalm 67 and the combined Sephirot for that day
Siddur Sefard (Nusach Askenaz, Sefard and Ari)	Sephardi (minority); Chasidic (excl. Chabad)	At the end of the introductory prayers as part of the Korbanot (sacrifices) recital, before the start of Pesukei Dezimra.	After the opening Psalms Ps 95–100, 29, and before Lekha Dodi.	After counting the Omer and reciting Psalm 67 towards the end of Maariv. After each counting section these siddurim include verses for contemplation put together with the word from Ana BeKoach for each Omer day, extracts from Psalm 67 and the combined Sephirot for that day
Siddur Chabad (Nusach Ari)	Chabad-Lubavitch	At the end of the introductory prayers as part of the Korbanot (sacrifices) recital, before the start of Pesukei Dezimra.	After the opening Psalms Ps 95–99, 29, and before Lekha Dodi (Note: Siddur Chabad excludes Yedid Nefesh)	After counting the Omer and reciting Psalm 67 towards the end of Maariv. After each counting section these siddurim include verses for contemplation put together with the word from Ana BeKoach for each Omer day, extracts from Psalm 67 and the combined Sephirot for that day

Other times Ana BeKoach is said outside formal services:

- As part of Shema al HaMitah (Bedtime Shema), to support the soul which departs until the morning. This arose from Nusach Ari.
- If they can, before someone dies, they say this prayer after Vidui (confession).
- As part of the funeral service to help the soul rise to heaven.
- Any time when needing additional strength for daily life.

It is the custom of Hasidim to recite the piyyut during:

- the laps of Simchat Torah, with one sentence recited in the order of each lap.
- Tashlikh ceremony on Rosh Hashanah or during the blowing of the Shofar.
- in the hymns of the Hosanna, during the beating of the willow in the Hoshana Rabbah.
- when lighting Hanukkah candles, seven times.

== Text of Ana BeKoach ==
This table highlights the 42-word name by indicating the initial letter from each word forming it in bold. The greyed-out acronyms are not spoken aloud in Orthodox practice.

Each verse is linked to:

- A Day of creation. First verse linked to the first day, second verse to the second day etc.
- A Day of the week. First verse linked to Sunday, second verse to Monday etc.
- The lower seven Sephirot of the Kabbalah. First verse linked to Chesed, second verse to Gevura etc.

The eighth verse (Ps 72:19) following the piyyut is not part of it but serves to close it like Amen closes blessings. This verse is also recited after the first verse of the Shema.

v.	English translation	Transliteration	42-letter name	Hebrew	Sephira	Day
The 3-letter acronyms (grey) form the 42–word name. They are obtained by extracting the first (bold) letter of each word. In Orthodox practice, these are not said aloud. (Note: This article conforms to the prohibition against writing HaShem's holy names where they may be destroyed, based on Deuteronomy 12:3–4 (Destroy everything related to idols / But do not allow anything holy of HaShem's to be destroyed). This does not apply to electronic writing, but it may be printed so Halacha extends the prohibition to electronic media. It also does not apply to other languages, but to show respect Halacha extends it to these (therefore, "G-d"). The holy names falling within the prohibition in this article are: The 4-letter Great Name which is never pronounced. It is represented by "HaShem", or for liturgy by "Ad-nai". Words including part of the name are excluded (e.g. Hallelujah) unless confusion may happen (e.g. Judah).; The 42-letter name which is never pronounced, does not appear directly in the Tanach but falls within the prohibition because it is derived from the 4-letter name, and from the beginning of Genesis.; Instances of one of the Tanach names for HaShem (Elokim in Psalm 67) have had their "h" replaced with a "k" ("Hey" with a "Kuf" in Hebrew).; This article only makes reference to the 42-letter name in letters in the section setting out the piyyut text, and the Omer table. It is required in these instances to understand how it is woven into the piyyut, and how it relates to the Omer. In these cases the second letter of each 3-letter acronym has been replaced with the infinity symbol (∞) so no portions of the name would be printed if the article were printed, the name is not written as one word, it is coloured grey to indicate it is different to other text, and warnings are given that it should only be contemplated, with no attempt being made to determine how it is pronounced, or to recite it. All other references to it are to the "42-letter name". The 4-letter name does not appear in the article at all, it is always referred to by "HaShem" or the "4-letter name". All names of HaShem, even if replacing other names (like "HaShem" itself), should be treated with respect.)
1	We beg you! With the strength and greatness of your right arm, untie our bundled sins.	Ana BeKoach gedullat yemincha, tattir tzerurah.	א∞"ג י∞"ץ	אַנָּא בְּכֹחַ גְּדֻלַּת יְמִינְךָ. תַּתִּיר צְרוּרָה:	חסד (Chesed)	יום ראשון (Sun)
2	Accept your nation's song; elevate and purify us, O Awesome One.	Kabbel rinnat ammecha; Saggevenu taharenu, nora.	ק∞"ע ש∞"ן	קַבֵּל רִנַּת עַמְּךָ. שַׂגְּבֵנוּ טַהֲרֵנוּ נוֹרָא:	גבורה (Gevurah)	יום שני (Mon)
3	Please, O Heroic One, those who foster your Oneness, guard them like the pupil of an eye.	Na gibbor, doreshei yichudecha, kevabbat shamerem.	נ∞"ד י∞"ש	נָא גִּבּוֹר. דּוֹרְשֵׁי יִחוּדְךָ. כְּבַבַּת שָׁמְרֵם:	תפארת (Tiferet)	יום שלישי (Tue)
4	Bless them, purify them, pity them. May Your righteousness always reward them.	Barechem, taharem, rachamei. Tzidkatecha tamid gamelem.	ב∞"ר צ∞"ג	בָּרְכֶם טַהֲרֵם. רַחֲמֵי צִדְקָתְךָ. תָּמִיד גָּמְלֵם:	נצח (Netzach)	יום רביעי (Wed)
5	Powerful Holy One, in much goodness guide Your congregation.	Chasin kadosh, berov tuvecha nahel adatecha.	ח∞"ב ט∞"ע	חָסִין קָדוֹשׁ. בְּרוֹב טוּבְךָ. נָהֵל עֲדָתֵךָ:	הוד (Hod)	יום חמישי (Thu)
6	Unique and Exalted One, turn to Your nation which proclaims Your holiness.	Yachid ge'eh, Le'ammecha peneh zocherei kedushettecha.	י∞"ל פ∞"ק	יָחִיד גֵּאֶה. לְעַמְּךָ פְּנֵה. זוֹכְרֵי קְדֻשֶּׁתֶּךָ:	יסוד (Yesod)	יום שישי (Fri)
7	Accept our entreaty and hear our screams, O Knower of Mysteries.	Shav'atenu kabbel veshama tza'akatenu, yodea' ta'alumot.	ש∞"ו צ∞"ת	שַׁוְעָתֵנוּ קַבֵּל. וְשָׁמַע צַעֲקָתֵנוּ. יוֹדֵעַ תַּעֲלֻמוֹת:	מלכות (Malkuth)	יום שבת (Sat)
Said in a whisper, except on Yom Kippur when it is said aloud.
8	Blessed is the name of His glorious kingdom, forever and ever.	Baruch shem kevod malchuto, le'olam va'ed.	Ps 72:19	בָּרוּךְ שֵׁם כְּבוֹד מַלְכוּתוֹ לְעוֹלָם וָעֶד:	-	-

== Kabbalah influence on Ana BeKoach ==
=== Central aspects of Kabbalah related to Ana BeKoach ===
Tree of Life showing the Sefirot

the meaning, structure and power of the piyyut can be explained using the following Kabbalah related ideas:

- Sephirot: The ten attributes/emanations of Ein Sof, through which the universe's existence is sustained.
- Letters of the Torah: Not only the words of the Torah, but each of its letters contain deep mystical meaning. Torah study must include the learning of these meanings. Gematria is one of many methods used to understand this meaning.
- Other names of HaShem: The 4-letter name of HaShem, revealed to Moses from the burning bush, is the most important name in terms of Kabbalah and orthodox Judaisms understanding of HaShem. Kabbalah investigates other names of HaShem, which are contained in the 4-letter name and have mystical significance which can influence the physical universe. These names are derived from the Torah and have various numbers of letters. The most important are the 42-letter and 72-letter names.
- The numbers 42 and 49: 42 is metophorically related to the exodus from Egypt and the journey to Eretz Yisrael. 49 is related to the counting of the Omer.
- Living Kabbalah: The inclusion of Kabbalah learning in daily life and particularly in prayer services.
- Adoption by other Jews: Kabbalah learning has been accepted by most orthodox Jewish traditions as Halacha, especially but not limited to Chasidim. Most Orthodox Jews have adopted some Kabbalah practices in their Nusach. Isaac Luria (also known as Ha'ari, Ha'ari Hakadosh or Arizal) and his Nusach Ari have been central to this adoption.

=== The importance of the number 42 (7×6) ===
==== 42 Journeys from Egypt to the Promised Land ====
Numbers 33 sets out the route the Israelites took from leaving Egypt to entering the Promised Land. The route includes 42 journeys from one camp to another over 40 years before they eventually enter the land of Israel. According to the Baal Shem Tov each of the 42 camps represents steps that person must successfully navigate to fulfill their life purpose from birth (the exit from Egypt) to death and entry into Olam Haba (World to Come) equated with the Israelites entering the Promised Land.

Piyyut and other liturgy based on 42, and the 42-letter name assist those who contemplate them to understands each of the 42 personal waypoints they must encounter, and how to surmount them.

The forty-two 'stations' from Egypt to the Promised Land are replayed in the life of every individual Jew, as his soul journeys from its descent to earth at birth to its return to its Source.

— Rabbi Israel Baal Shem Tov

When God brought the Jews out from Egypt, He brought them out with the mystery of the 42-letter name, just as He created heaven and earth...

— Zohar Hadash

R. Yehudah b. Shalom HaLevi said in the name of R. Yonah; and also R. Levi in the name of R. Hama b. R. Hanina said: 'The manna descended after [it had journeyed through] forty-two stages.'

— Midrash Rabbah Shemot 25:5

==== Using the 42-letter name to create the world ====
A permutation of the first 42 letter of Genesis are said to indirectly encode the 42-letter name. This is interpreted by Kabbalah and Talmud as indicating that HaShem used his 42-letter name to create the world. The Hebrew name for the 42 letter name is שם מ'בֶ (The Mem Bet name).

God created the world with this forty-two lettered name.

— Zohar II:234b (II:27.264)

'And the Earth Was Void and Without Form.' This describes the original state, as it were..., until the world was graven with forty-two letters, all of which are the ornamentation of the Holy Name.

— Zohar I:30a (I:30.318)

==== Using the 42-letter name to reintroduce HaShem to the enslaved Israelites ====
When Moses asked HaShem who he should tell the Israelites had sent him, he was told that HaShem's name was "Ehyeh asher Ehyeh" (I will be what I will be) Exodus 3:13–14. The Gematria numerical equivalent for Hebrew word "Ehyeh" is 21. Since the word appears twice in the name this gives 42, referring to the 42-letter name (Talmud Kedushin 71).

==== 42 in the holy texts ====
- There are forty-two lines in each column of the Torah (Tractate Soferim 2:6).
- The scripts in each Tefillin (Shel Yad and Shel Rosh) each mentions HaShem's name 21 times, in total 42 times for both Tefillin.
- The Geonim say the Shem HaMephorash pronounced by the Kohen Gadol when he entered the Kodesh HaKodashim on Yom Kippur was the 42-letter name.
- 42 is the number of days of Sefirat HaOmer after seven days of Passover.
- there are 42 words in the piyyut Ana BeKoach, the first letters of which spell out the 42-letter name.
- The Shema (declaration that HaShem the G-d is one) is the most important prayer in the siddur. Its opening paragraph (following the Shema declaration itself) starting "Ve'ahavta" contains 42 words which (less obviously than Ana BeKoach encode the 42-letter name linking it to Ana BeKoach.
- The Zohar says that the first blessing of the Amidah (the second most important prayer) originally contained 42 words which also encoded the 42-letter name. This is no longer apparent in modern siddurim because of millennia of transcription errors.
- Verses 10 and 11 of Kaddish (prayer said between sections of prayer serves, and as prayer for the dead) contain the 7 words וְיִשְׁתַּבַּח וְיִתְפָּאַר וְיִתְרוֹמַם וְיִתְנַשֵּׂא וְיִתְהַדָּר וְיִתְעַלֶּה וְיִתְהַלָּל... (...veyishtabbaḥ veyitpa'ar veyitromam / Veyitnasse veyithaddar veyitʻalleh veyithallal...). These 7 words which have important meaning (describing various attributes of HaShem) each consists of 6 letters, giving a total of 42 letters. The first letter of each word is "Vav" which has a Gematria numerical value of 6.

=== To match the Omer days, 49 (7×7) elements are required ===
Ana BeKoach: Each verse of the 7 verses of the piyyut contains contains 6 word. The 6-letter acronym (two 3-letter acronyms taken together), derived from each verse, which forms part of the 42-letter name, is added to the end of the verse as a word. Constructed in this way it has 49 words (7 verses of 7 words each).

Psalm 67: After counting the Omer for the day, Psalm 67 is recited and then Ana BeKoach is read. If the first verse to Psalm 67 (which gives introductory information only) is ignored, the Psalm consists of 49 words each of which is associated with successive Omer days. Similarly verse 5 of Psalm 67 contains 49 letters which are also each linked to the Omer days. This Psalm is further associated with the Temple menorah, the 7 armed oil lamp used in the Beit HaMikdash (Holy Temple) services, which links the Psalm and the Omer count to the Beit HaMikdash where the Omer (a measure of barley) was brought on the second day of Pesach as an offering of the first part of the harvest to HaShem.

Exodus journey stations: The stations represent life experiences which a person needs to overcome. The lower 7 sefirot are part of these experiences each of which needs to be understood for a person to proceed in life. The 42 stations and 7 sefirot make 49 life stages.

Sephirot: The 7 lower Sephirot are said to contain each of the Sephirot (including themselves) within them. There are therefore 49 permutations of Sephirot. Each Sefira is linked to a week in the Omer count. On each day of that week the week's Sefira is contemplated in relation to one of the others it contains. On the seventh day of a particular Sefira's week, the Sefira is contemplated, as it relates to itself.

== Associating these concepts with Ana BeKoach ==
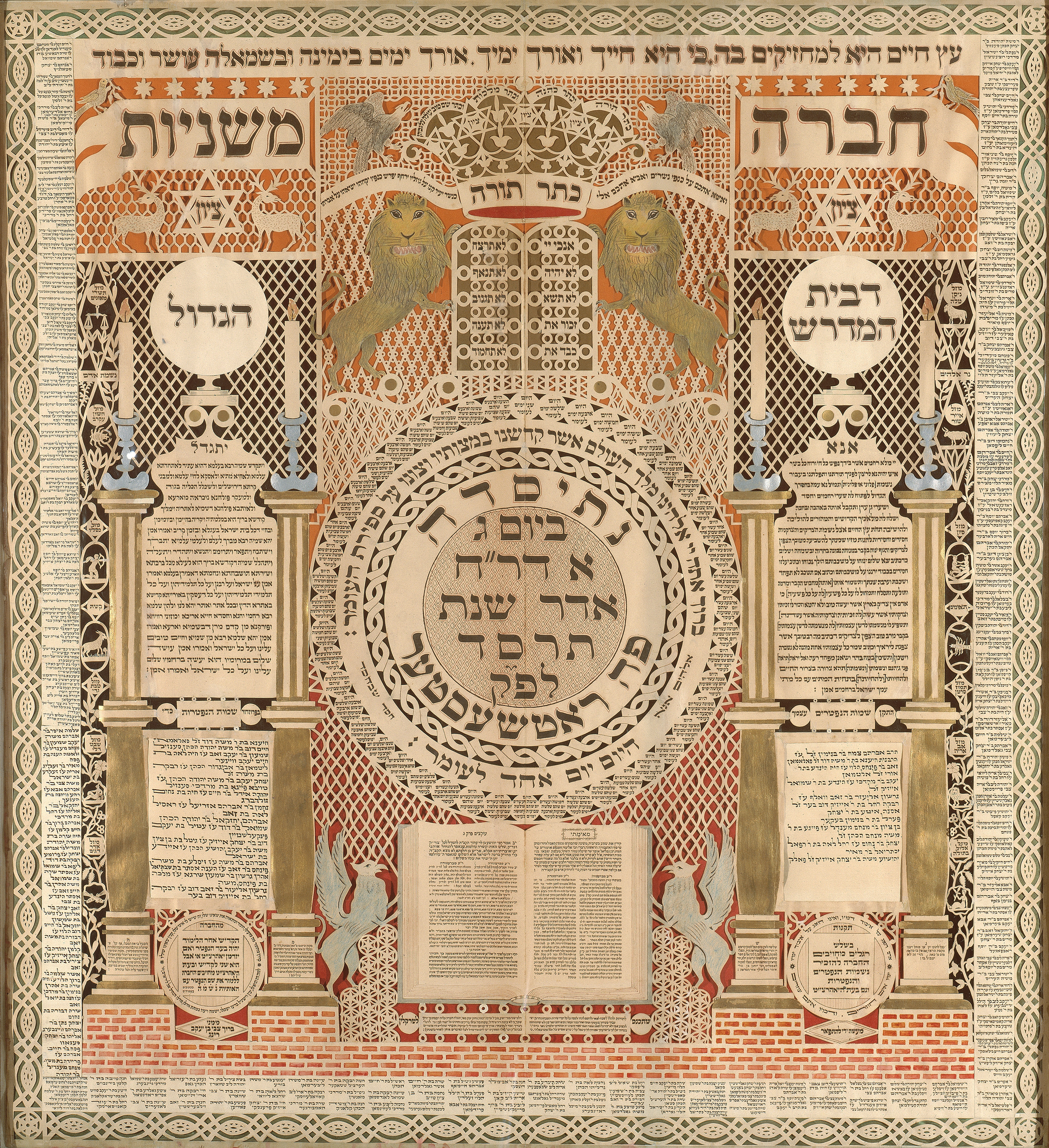
Omer Calendar

the 49 days of the Omer should remind Jews of the journey of the nation from Egypt to Israel through 42 waypoints and 7 Sephirot, and how this relates to the steps they must take in their personal life journey. The piyyut with its 49 nine words (42 words plus the 7 component parts of the 42-letter name derived from it), the 49 words of Psalm 67 and the 49 letters of verse 5 of that Psalm are associated with days of the Omer, to assist a Jew to understand the life steps and how to confront them.

Ana BeKoach is one of the Kabbalistic inspired piyyut included in all orthodox services. It was constructed to associate it with the mystical meaning of the lower seven Sephirot and the 42-letter name. Its various uses by all Jewish traditions include the devine mystical power into these observances. Reciting the piyyut has the power of bringing the Ein Sof light to earth strengthening the person reciting it, and the nation to face it ongoing journey.

Every time the piyyut is recited one must focus on how it's can assist them in their life journey. The piyyut is said in the Parashat Korbanot read during Shacharit and during Kabbalat Shabbat. It reaches its full potential of guiding a person through life by its association with the counting of the Omer, through its intertwining with the other 49–derived items.

An additional verse for contemplation is inserted in the Omer service after the day's count in Edut Hamizrach, Sefard and Chasid Siddurim. These siddurim give the formula for the verse as:

The Ana BeKoach word for that day (with its initial letter that forms part of the 42-letter name), plus
The combined Sephirot for that day, plus
The Psalm 67 word for that day, plus
The Psalm 67, verse 5, letter for that day.

This constructed verse combines all the Kabbalah elements in these various sources into the counting of the Omer for each day.

The table below shows how all these parts for each Omer day fit together. For example:

- Week 1, Weekday 1 = Day 1 of the Omer: Ana BeKoach word – Ana (Please), Sephirot – loving kindness within loving kindness, Psalm 67 word – Elokim, Verse 5 letter – Yud (the tenth letter of the aleph-bet). Combining these gives the contemplation verse for the day 1 counting as: "Ana – loving kindness within loving kindness – Elokim – Yud". In Hebrew: אנא חסד שבחסד אלקים י.
- Week 2, Weekday 3 = Day 10 of the Omer: Ana BeKoach word – ammecha (your nation), Sephirot – beauty within strength, Psalm 67 word – darchecha (your paths), Verse 5 letter – Nun (the fourteenth letter in the aleph-bet). Combining these gives the contemplation verse for the day 10 counting as: "Ammecha – beauty within strength – darchecha – Nun". In Hebrew: עמך תפארת שבגבורה דרכך נ.

By counting the Omer and contemplating the other items, associated with it a Jew can understand their journey through life, and which areas they currently need to work on to achieve the goal of finally uniting with Ein Sof.

Associating Ana BeKoach with Sefirat Ha'Omer, the Sephirot, the 42-letter name, Psalm 67 and the Exodus journey camps (Numbers 33) [The count reads down the week columns from left to right]
		Week 1 (Note: "Week" and "Weekday" refer to an Omer week, and Omer days within that week. For example: • Week 1, Weekday 1 is the first day of the first week of the Omer (16 Nissan, the start of the counting). • Week 5, Weekday 5 is the fifth day of the fifth week of the Omer (18 Iyar, Lag BaOmer, day 33 of the counting). • Week 7, Weekday 7 is the seventh day of the seventh week of the Omer (5 Sivan, day 49, the last day of the counting. Shavuot is the next day, 6 Sivan).) חסד	Week 2 גבורה	Week 3 תפארת	Week 4 נצח	Week 5 הוד	Week 6 יסוד	Week 7 מלכות
Weekday 1 חסד	Hebrew Date	16 Nissan	23 Nissan	30 Nissan	7 Iyar	14 Iyar	21 Iyar	28 Iyar
Weekday 1 חסד	Day count	1 day	8 days	15 days	22 days	29 days	36 days	43 days
Weekday 1 חסד	Week count	–	1 week 1 day	2 weeks 1 day	3 weeks 1 day	4 weeks 1 day	5 weeks 1 day	6 weeks 1 day
Weekday 1 חסד	Ana BeKoach	אָנָּא	קֳבֵּל	נָא	בָּרְכֵם	חָסִין	יָחִיד	שַׁוְעָתֵנוּ
Weekday 1 חסד	Sephira	חסד שבחסד	חסד שבגבורה	חסד שבתפארת	חסד שבנצח	חסד שבהוד	חסד שביסוד	חסד שבמלכות
Weekday 1 חסד	Psalm 67	אלקים	לדעת	עמים	לאמים	תנחם	כלם	יברכנו
Weekday 1 חסד	Psalm 67:5	י	ר	י	ו	י	מ	ת
Weekday 1 חסד	Camp (Life Stage)	Ramses (Birth)	Red Sea (Rejuvenation)	Kibroth-hattaavah (Cravings)	Kehelath; Group Pressure)	Mithkah (Nachas)	Abronah (Old age)	Oboth (Pain)
Weekday 2 גבורה	Hebrew Date	17 Nissan	24 Nissan	1 Iyar	8 Iyar	15 Iyar	22 Iyar	29 Iyar
Weekday 2 גבורה	Day count	2 days	9 days	16 days	23 days	30 days	37 days	44 days
Weekday 2 גבורה	Week count	–	1 week 2 days	2 weeks 2 days	3 weeks 2 days	4 weeks 2 days	5 weeks 2 days	6 weeks 2 days
Weekday 2 גבורה	Ana BeKoach	בְּכֹחַ	רִנַּת	גִּבּוֹר	טַהֲרֵם	קָדוֹשׁ	גֵּאֶה	קַבֵּל
Weekday 2 גבורה	Sephira	גבורה שבחסד	גבורה שבגבורה	גבורה שבתפארת	גבורה שבנצח	גבורה שבהוד	גבורה שביסוד	גבורה שבמלכות
Weekday 2 גבורה	Psalm 67	יחננו	בארץ	אלקים	כי	סלה	ארץ	אלקים
Weekday 2 גבורה	Psalm 67:5	ש	נ	ם	ט	ש	י	נ
Weekday 2 גבורה	Camp (Life Stage)	Sukkot (Young child)	Sin wilderness (Crises of faith)	Hazeroth (Rebellion)	Mount Shepher (Nature)	Hashmonah (Emissary)	Ezion-geber (Distinguish)	Iye-abarim (Lost)
Weekday 3 תפארת	Hebrew Date	18 Nissan	25 Nissan	2 Iyar	9 Iyar	16 Iyar	23 Iyar	1 Sivan
Weekday 3 תפארת	Day count	3 days	10 days	17 days	24 days	31 days	38 days	45 days
Weekday 3 תפארת	Week count	–	1 week 3 days	2 weeks 3 days	3 weeks 3 days	4 weeks 3 days	5 weeks 3 days	6 weeks 3 days
Weekday 3 תפארת	Ana BeKoach	גְּדוּלַת	עַמְּךָ	דּוֹרְשֵׁי	רַחֲמֵי	בְּרֹב	לְעַמְּךָ	וּשְׁמַע
Weekday 3 תפארת	Sephira	תפארת שבחסד	תפארת שבגבורה	תפארת שבתפארת	תפארת שבנצח	תפארת שבהוד	תפארת שביסוד	תפארת שבמלכות
Weekday 3 תפארת	Psalm 67	ויברכנו	דרכך	יודוך	תשפוט	יודוך	נתנה	וייראו
Weekday 3 תפארת	Psalm 67:5	מ	נ	כ	ע	ו	ם	ח
Weekday 3 תפארת	Camp (Life Stage)	Etham (Older child)	Dophkah (Fear)	Rithmah (Purpose)	Haradah (Overcome fear)	Moseroth (Councilor)	Kadesh (Reactions)	Dibon-gad (Life blessings)
Weekday 4 נצח	Hebrew Date	19 Nissan	26 Nissan	3 Iyar	10 Iyar	17 Iyar	24 Iyar	2 Sivan
Weekday 4 נצח	Day count	4 days	11 days	18 days	25 days	32 days	39 days	46 days
Weekday 4 נצח	Week count	–	1 week 4 days	2 weeks 4 days	3 weeks 4 days	4 weeks 4 days	5 weeks 4 days	6 weeks 4 days
Weekday 4 נצח	Ana BeKoach	יְמִינְךָ	שַׂגְּבֵנוּ	יִחוּדֶךָ	צִדְקָתְךָ	טוּבְךָ	פְנֵה	צַעֲקָתֵנוּ
Weekday 4 נצח	Sephira	נצח שבחסד	נצח שבגבורה	נצח שבתפארת	נצח שבנצח	נצח שבהוד	נצח שביסוד	נצח שבמלכות
Weekday 4 נצח	Ps 67	יאר	בכל	עמים	עמים	עמים	יבולה	אתו
Weekday 4 נצח	Psalm 67:5	ח	ו	י	מ	ר	ב	ם
Weekday 4 נצח	Camp (Life Stage)	Pi-HaCheirus (Teenager)	Alush (Power)	Rimmon-perez (Family)	Makheloth (Community)	Bene-jaakan (Older age)	Mount Hor (Love)	Almon-diblathaim (Loneliness)
Weekday 5 הוד	Hebrew Date	20 Nissan	27 Nissan	4 Iyar	11 Iyar	18 Iyar	25 Iyar	3 Sivan
Weekday 5 הוד	Day count	5 days	12 days	19 days	26 days	33 days	40 days	47 days
Weekday 5 הוד	Week count	–	1 week 5 days	2 weeks 5 days	3 weeks 5 days	4 weeks 5 days	5 weeks 5 days	6 weeks 5 days
Weekday 5 הוד	Ana BeKoach	תַּתִּיר	טַהֲרֵנוּ	כְּבָבַת	תָּמִיד	נַהֵל	זוֹכְרֵי	יוֹדֵעַ
Weekday 5 הוד	Sephira	הוד שבחסד	הוד שבגבורה	הוד שבתפארת	הוד שבנצח	הוד שבהוד	הוד שביסוד	הוד שבמלכות
Weekday 5 הוד	Ps 67	פניו	גוים	כלם	פניו	אלקים	יברכנו	כל
Weekday 5 הוד	Psalm 67:5	ו	ל	ת	י	ו	א	ס
Weekday 5 הוד	Camp (Life Stage)	Marah (Young Adult)	Rephidim (Weakness)	Libnah (Home)	Tahath (Middle age)	Hor-haggidgad (Wisdom)	Zalmonah (Petulance)	Aviram Mountain (Sadness)
Weekday 6 יסוד	Hebrew Date	21 Nissan	28 Nissan	5 Iyar	12 Iyar	19 Iyar	26 Iyar	4 Sivan
Weekday 6 יסוד	Day count	6 days	13 days	20 days	27 days	34 days	41 days	48 days
Weekday 6 יסוד	Week count	–	1 week 6 days	2 weeks 6 days	3 weeks 6 days	4 weeks 6 days	5 weeks 6 days	6 weeks 6 days
Weekday 6 יסוד	Ana BeKoach	צְרוּרָה	נוֹרָא	שָׁמְרֵם	גָּמְלֵם	עֲדָתֶךָ	קְדֻשָּׁתֶךָ	תַּעֲלוּמוֹת
Weekday 6 יסוד	Sephira	יסוד שבחסד	יסוד שבגבורה	יסוד שבתפארת	יסוד שבנצח	יסוד שבהוד	יסוד שביסוד	יסוד שבמלכות
Weekday 6 יסוד	Ps 67	אתנו	ישועתך	ישמחו	ולאמים	יודוך	אלקים	אפסי
Weekday 6 יסוד	Psalm 67:5	ו	א	ש	ם	ל	ר	ל
Weekday 6 יסוד	Camp (Life Stage)	Elim (Adult)	Sinai (Revelation)	Rissah (Failure)	Terah (Parenting)	Jotbath (Calmness)	Punon (Disease)	Moab Plains (Death-New Life)
Weekday 7 מלכות	Hebrew Date	22 Nissan	29 Nissan	6 Iyar	13 Iyar	20 Iyar	27 Iyar	5 Sivan
Weekday 7 מלכות	Day count	7 days	14 days	21 days	28 days	35 days	42 days	49 days
Weekday 7 מלכות	Week count	1 week	2 weeks	3 weeks	4 weeks	5 weeks	6 weeks	7 weeks
Weekday 7 מלכות	Ana BeKoach	א∞"ג י∞"ץ	ק∞"ע ש∞"ן	נ∞"ד י∞"ש	ב∞"ר צ∞"ג	ח∞"ב ט∞"ע	י∞"ל פ∞"ק	ש∞"ו צ∞"ת
Weekday 7 מלכות	Sephira	מלכות שבחסד	מלכות שבגבורה	מלכות שבתפארת	מלכות שבנצח	מלכות שבהוד	מלכות שביסוד	מלכות שבמלכות
Weekday 7 מלכות	Ps 67	סלה	יודוך	וירננו	בארץ	עמים	אלקינו	ארץ
Weekday 7 מלכות	Psalm 67:5	י	מ	פ	מ	א	ץ	ה
Weekday 7 מלכות	Camp (Life Stage)	Sefira; Chesed	Sephira; Gevura	Sephira; Tiferet	Sephira; Netsuch	Sephira; Hod	Sefira; Yesod	Sephira; Malchut

== In popular culture ==
- King David (father father father) (2023) — An Israeli hip-hop song released by Israeli rapper Dudu Faruk (Ori Comay) includes a rapid recitation of Ana beKoach at the end of the track.
- The Marvelous Mrs. Maisel (2017-2023) — A rendition of Ana BeKoach is featured in the television show in a synagogue scene.
