= Bael (demon) =

Demon described in demonological grimoires

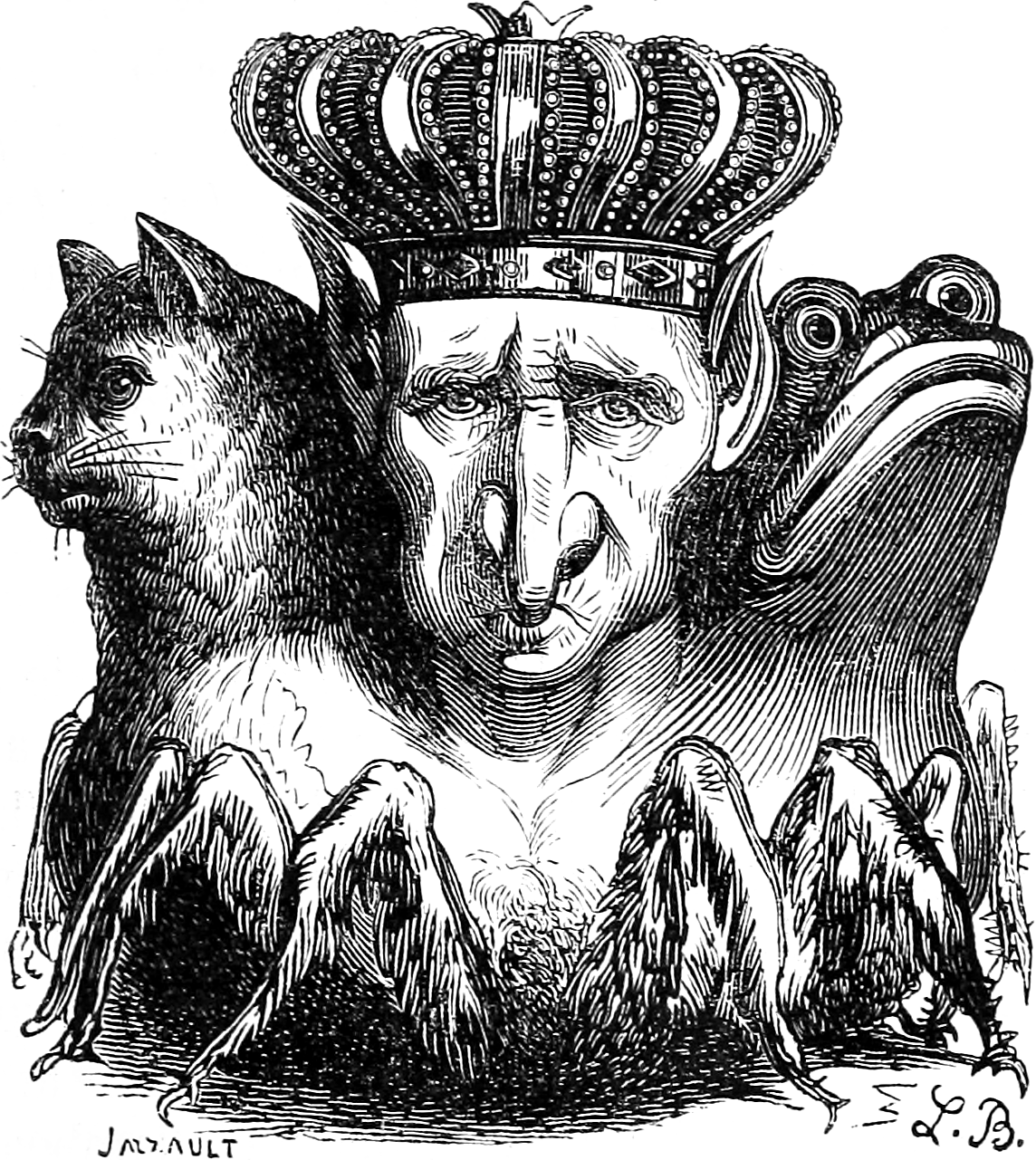
Dictionnaire Infernal illustration of Bael

Bael (Ba’al or Baal) is a demon described in demonological grimoires such as The Lesser Key of Solomon and the Pseudomonarchia Daemonum (where he is the first spirit mentioned) and also in the Dictionnaire Infernal.

He is described as a hoarsely voiced king with the power to make men invisible and ruling over sixty-six legions of demons. (Note: Baal, as a deity, is also listed in an earlier and separate entry, though de Plancy does connect the two.)

== Description ==
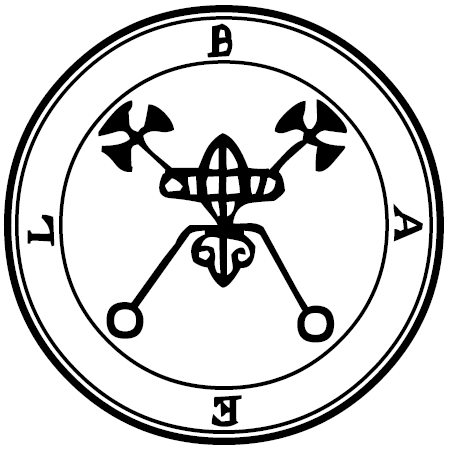
The sigil of Bael

The Lesser Key of Solomon describes him as appearing in the form of a cat, toad, human, some combination thereof, or other "diverse shapes", while the Pseudomonarchia Daemonum and the Dictionnaire Infernal state that he appears with the heads of a cat, toad, and human simultaneously.

Jacques Collin de Plancy wonders if Bael is the same as the Canaanite deity Baal, a "reasonable" assumption. In the Livre des Esperitz, Bael (as Beal) is described as a king ruled by Oriens (himself a demon overseeing the cardinal direction east, or the Orient), still possessing the power of invisibility, as well as the power to garner the favor of others, but ruling over only six (rather than sixty-six) legions of demons. The Liber Officiorum Spirituum features Baal, Baall, Boal, or Boall, again as a hoarsely voiced king (or sometimes a soldier), with not only the powers of invisibility but also of the sciences and love. Sloane MS 3824 mentions Baal, in "Of the Demon Rulers", as a king ruled by Oriens, attributed with teaching science, (again) granting invisibility, and controlling 250 legions of spirits.

Bael appears in later editions of The Grimoire of Pope Honorius, under Astaroth, as a prince whose powers include (again) invisibility and popularity. In the Grand Grimoire, Bael (as Baal) is listed as a subordinate of Lucifuge Rofocale. According to Thomas Rudd, Bael is opposed by the Shem HaMephorash angel Vehuiah.

== In popular culture ==
- Baal appears as a recurring antagonist in the long-running German dime novel series Geisterjäger John Sinclair. The novels and audio dramas by author Jason Dark depict Baal as one of the archdemons along with Astaroth, Eurynome and Amducias.
- In the anime series Mobile Suit Gundam: Iron-Blooded Orphans, a prominent mobile suit is known as "ASW-G-01 Gundam Bael".
- Makoto, a god and ruler of the Inazuma region in the video game Genshin Impact, goes by the name Baal.
- Baal is the demon that possesses Father Lucas Trevant, played by Anthony Hopkins, in the film The Rite (2011).
- Baal was the primary antagonist in Diablo II: Lord of Destruction, the 2001 expansion pack to Blizzard Entertainment's Diablo II.
- Baal is a high-ranking demon and one of the main antagonists in Japanese anime and manga series Welcome to Demon School! Iruma-kun.
- Bael is one of many demons mentioned to be worshipped by the Hameln cult in the 2023 analog horror video game series Amanda the Adventurer.
- Bael is the second-in-command of Hell in the 2024 Korean drama series The Judge from Hell, portrayed by actor Shin Sung-rok.
- Baal is Nippon Ichi's Disgaea series`s most common recurring Superboss, known as "The Lord of Terror" and "The Tyrant Overlord".
- The Warhammer 40,000 book series, Eisenhorn, includes a prominent recurring antagonist known as "Cherubael" whom also sometimes goes by the name of "Bael" or "Cherub of Bael".
