= Valac =

Goetic demon

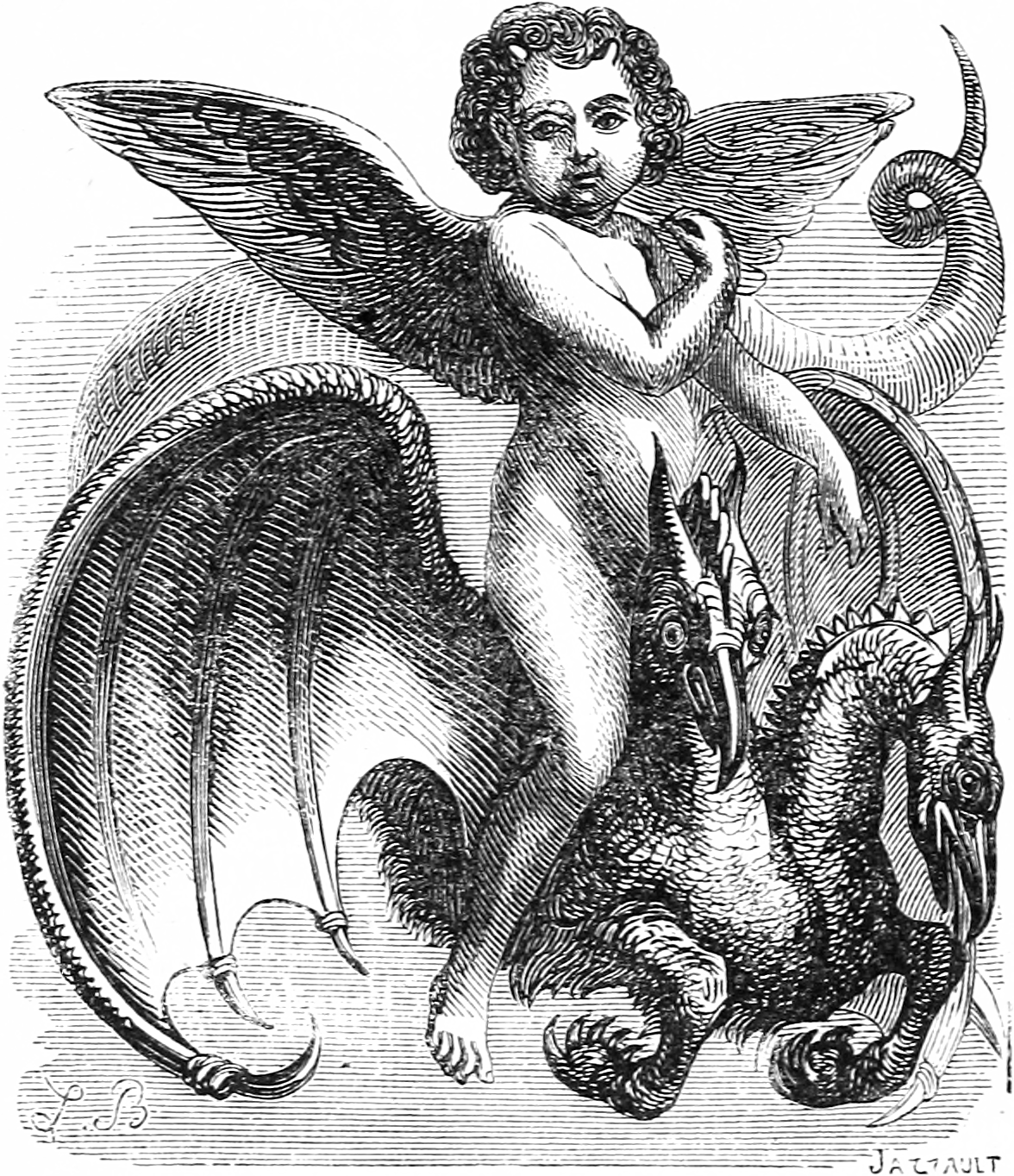
Valak as depicted in the Dictionnaire Infernal

Seal of Valac (Ars Goetia)

Valac is a demon described in the goetic grimoires The Lesser Key of Solomon (in some versions as Ualac or Valak and in Thomas Rudd's variant as Valu), Johann Weyer's Pseudomonarchia Daemonum (as Volac), the Liber Officiorum Spirituum (as Coolor or Doolas), and in the Munich Manual of Demonic Magic (as Volach) as an angelically winged boy riding a two-headed dragon, attributed with the power of finding treasures.

== Variations ==
The Lesser Key, the Munich Manual, Rudd, and Weyer further agree in ranking Valac as a president and attributing him with the power to locate, summon, and control serpents. The Officium Spirituum similarly attributes Doolas with the power to give the summoner command of serpents as well as "household spirits," but it ranks Coolor and Doolas as princes instead of presidents.

Valac is listed 62nd in the Lesser Key (even by Rudd) and the 50th by Weyer, with either version claiming he leads 30 legions of demons (though some manuscripts say 38). The Munich Manual describes Volach as controlling 27 legions of spirits. The Officium Spirituum (depending on the manuscript) ranks Coolor as either 22nd (with no note of how many spirits he commands) or (in the copy found in the Folger Shakespeare Library) 22nd and commanding 13 legions of spirits. All extant and complete versions of the Officium Spirituum list Doolas as 25th demon, commanding 20 legions of spirits.

Rudd's version uniquely has Valac opposed by the Shem HaMephorash angel Iahhael.

A manuscript titled Fasciculus Rerum Geomanticarum lists him as Volach.

== In popular culture ==
- Aegis Orta, valac becames the main character on the series
- The 1998 film Vampires features a character named "Jan Valek" as the first vampire.
- Volac appears in the Chilling Adventures of Sabrina comic book series. In issue #7, a young Edward Spellman, father of Sabrina Spellman, summons the demon at the request of Alphonse Louis Constant.
- Ualac appears in the Hellboy: Box Full of Evil as a major antagonist.
- The Conjuring 2, The Nun, and The Nun II feature Valak as the main antagonist, taking on the form of a demonic nun and The Crooked Man from the rhyme "There Was a Crooked Man". The Nun reveals that it took the form of a nun to hide amongst the Sisters. In The Nun and The Nun II, its main weakness is the Blood of Christ. Its ability to block Lorraine's visions makes it the most dangerous entity in The Conjuring Universe, and it is described as "Valak, the defiler, the profane, the marquis of snakes..."
- Valac appears as the fourth boss in the video game Bloodstained: Curse of the Moon. He is depicted as a two-headed dragon that can fuse to make an even bigger dragon. He appears again in Bloodstained: Ritual of the Night.
- Valak appears also in the first season of Shadowhunters where it is summoned to retrieve Clary's memories back from it.
- The manga series Welcome to Demon School! Iruma-kun has a main character named Clara Valac, a hyperactive demon girl who can make copies of anything she sees.
- Valac (Valacor) appears in season 1 episode 2 of the 2025 TV series The Bondsman starring Kevin Bacon.

== Bibliography ==
- Boudet, Jean-Patrice (2003). "Les who's who démonologiques de la Renaissance et leurs ancêtres médiévaux". Médiévales. Langues, Textes, Histoire. Médiévales (in French) (44). Revues.org: 117–140. doi:10.4000/medievales.1019.
- Kieckhefer, Richard (1998) [1997]. Forbidden Rites: A Necromancer's Manual of the Fifteenth Century. University Park, Pennsylvania: Pennsylvania State University Press. p. 161. ISBN 0-271-01750-3.
- Peterson, Joseph H., ed. (May 2001). Lemegeton Clavicula Salomonis: The Lesser Key of Solomon, Detailing the Ceremonial Art of Commanding Spirits Both Good and Evil;. Maine: Weiser Books (published 2001). ISBN 1-57863-220-X.
- Porter, John (2011). Campbell, Colin D. (ed.). A Book of the Office of Spirits. Translated by Hockley, Frederick. Teitan Press. ISBN 978-0933429253.
- Porter, John; Weston, John (2015). Harms, Daniel; Clark, James R.; Peterson, Joseph H. (eds.). The Book of Oberon: A Sourcebook for Elizabethan Magic (first ed.). Llewellyn Publications. ISBN 978-0-7387-4334-9.
- Rudd, Thomas (2010). Skinner, Stephen; Rankine, David (eds.). The Goetia of Dr Rudd. Golden Hoard Press (published 2007). ISBN 978-0738723556.
- Weyer, Johann (1563). Peterson, Joseph H. (ed.). Pseudomonarchia Daemonum (Liber officiorum spirituum). Twilit Grotto: Esoteric Archives (published 2000).
