= Gemory =

Demon listed on demonological grimoires

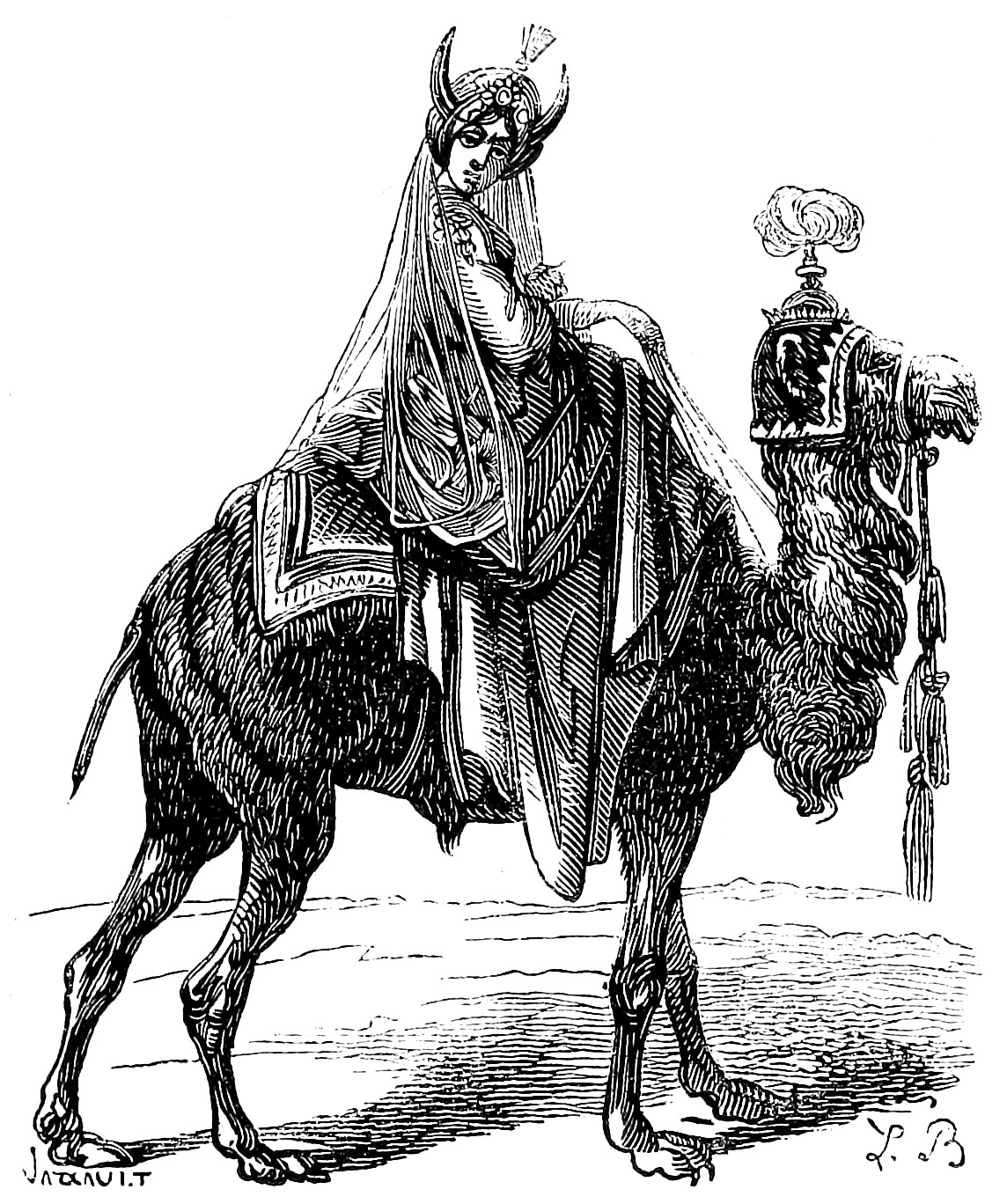
Gremory by Louis Le Breton, 1863

Gemory (also Gremory, Gamori, Gaeneron, Gemon, Gemyem) is a demon listed in demonological grimoires.

== Description ==
Gremory is described in demonological works such as the Munich Manual of Demonic Magic (Note: As Gaeneron.) the Liber Officiorum Spirituum (Note: As Gemon or Gemyem.) the Pseudomonarchia Daemonum, (Note: As Gomory.) the Lesser Key of Solomon, (Note: Some versions listing him as Gremory or Gamori.) the Dictionnaire Infernal, as appearing in the form of a beautiful woman (though as with all Goetic demons referred to using the masculine pronouns "he" and "his") wearing a duchess's crown and riding a camel, ascribed with the power of revealing hidden treasures and answering questions about the past, present, and future. The Munich Manual, Pseudomonarchia, Lesser Key, and Dictionnaire further give Gremory the power of procuring love from women (although the Liber Officiorum Spirituum describes her as "a companion of the love of women, and especially of maidens"), while the Pseudomonarchia and the Lesser Key note that the duchess's crown is (somehow) worn on Gremory's waist. Stephen Skinner and David Rankine, in their edition of The Goetia of Dr Rudd, suggest that this was a mistranslation of the Latin cingitur which should have been translated "encircling her head".

Gremory is mentioned in a manuscript labelled Fasciculus Rerum Geomanticarum.

== Legions and standing ==
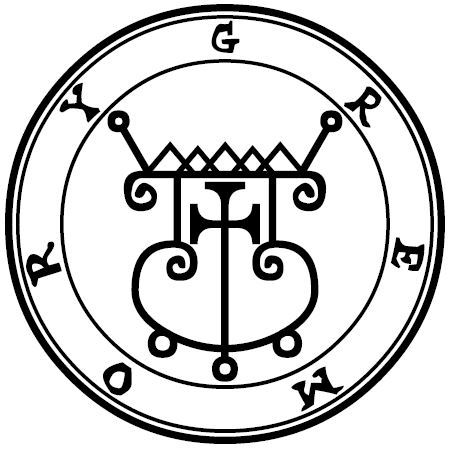
Gremory's seal in the Ars Goetia

In the Pseudomonarchia, (Note: As the 50th spirit.) Lesser Key, (Note: As the 56th spirit.) and Dictionnaire, Gremory is ranked as a duke ruling 26 legions of spirits, but (still a duke) ruling 27 in the Munich Manual of Demonic Magic and ruling 5 or 42 legions as either a duke, prince, or captain, in the Liber Officiorium Spirituum. (Note: As the 41st and 75th spirits.)

According to Rudd, Gremory is opposed by the Shemhamphorasch angel Poiel.

== In popular culture ==
- In manga and anime High School DxD, Gremory is one of the 72 Devil Noble Families of the Ars Goetia. The main female protagonist, Rias Gremory, is a member of the Gremory family and the love interest of the main protagonist Issei Hyodo.
- In the video game Fire Emblem: Three Houses (2019), Gremory is a master rank class that specializes in healing and black magic.
- In the video game Bloodstained: Ritual of the Night (2019) and its 8-bit spinoffs, one of the main antagonists is named Gremory, a demon associated with the moon.
- In South Korean television series The Judge from Hell (2024), Kim Ah-young plays Gremory, a demon who punishes other demons that have fallen in love with humans.
- In the video game series Shin Megami Tensei, Gremory is one of the demons you can fight against as a boss and recruit as an ally.
- In the video game "Guardian Tales" (2020), Gremory is a character which can be unlocked to be an ally.
