= Pseudomonarchia Daemonum =

1577 book by Johann Weyer

The Pseudomonarchia Daemonum (lit. 'False Monarchy of Demons') first appears as an appendix to De praestigiis daemonum (1577) by Johann Weyer. An abridgment of a grimoire similar in nature to the Ars Goetia (first book of The Lesser Key of Solomon), it contains a list of demons, and the appropriate hours and rituals to conjure them.

The Pseudomonarchia predates, and differs somewhat from, Ars Goetia. The Pseudomonarchia lists sixty-nine demons (in contrast to the later seventy-two), and their sequence varies, along with some of their characteristics. The demon Pruflas appears only in Pseudomonarchia, (Note: The Lesser Key of Solomon add the demons Vassago, Seere, Dantalion, and Andromalius.) and Pseudomonarchia does not attribute any sigils to the demons.

Weyer referred to his source manuscript as Liber officiorum spirituum, seu Liber dictus Empto. Salomonis, de principibus et regibus daemoniorum. (Book of the offices of spirits, or the book called 'Empto'. Solomon, concerning the princes and kings of demons.) This work is likely related to a very similar 1583 manuscript titled The Office of Spirits, both of which appear ultimately to be an elaboration on a fifteenth-century manuscript titled Le Livre des Esperitz (of which 30 of its 47 spirits are nearly identical to spirits in the Ars Goetia).

== The 69 Demons ==
1. King Baël
2. Duke Aguarès
3. President Barbas
4. Prince/Duke Pruflas
5. Marquess Amon
6. Duke/Count Barbatos
7. President Buer
8. Duke Gusoyn
9. Count/President Botis
10. Duke Bathym
11. King Pursan
12. Duke Eligos
13. Marquess Loray
14. Duke Valefor
15. Count/President Morax
16. Prince/Count Ipes
17. President Glasya labolas
18. Marquess Naberius
19. Duke Zepar
20. King Byleth
21. Prince Sytry
22. King Paimon
23. King Bélial
24. Duke Bune
25. Marquess Forneus
26. Marquess/Count Roneve
27. Duke Berith
28. Duke Astaroth
29. President Forras
30. Count Furfur
31. Marquess Marchocias
32. President Malphas
33. Duke Vepar
34. Marquess Sabnac
35. King Sidonay
36. Prince/President Gaap
37. Duke/Marquess Chax
38. Duke Pucel
39. Knight Furcas
40. Duke/Count Murmur
41. President Caym
42. Count Raum
43. Count Halphas
44. Duke Focalor
45. King/Count Vine
46. Count Bifrons
47. Marquess Gamigin
48. King/President Zagan
49. Marquess Orias
50. President Volac
51. Duke Gomory
52. King/Count Decarabia
53. Duke Amduscias
54. Marquess Andras
55. Marquess Andrealphus
56. President Oze
57. Duke Aym
58. Prince Orobas
59. Duke Vapula
60. Marquess Cimeries
61. President Amy
62. Duke Flauros
63. King Balam
64. Duke Alocer
65. Count Saleos
66. Duke Vuall
67. President Haagenti
68. Marquess Phoenix
69. Prince Stolas

== See also ==
- List of demons in the Ars Goetia
- The Lesser Key of Solomon
- Dictionnaire Infernal
