= Amy (demon) =

Demon described in demonological grimoires

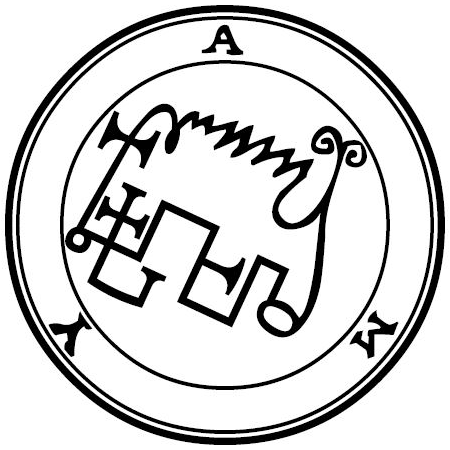
The sigil of Amy in The Lesser Key of Solomon

Amy, alternatively Avnas, Auns, Hanar, and Hanni, is a demon described in demonological grimoires such as The Lesser Key of Solomon (Note: As the fifty-eighth spirit.) (including Thomas Rudd's version (Note: As Auns, again fifty-eighth.)), the Pseudomonarchia Daemonum, (Note: As the sixty-first spirit) and in the Munich Manual of Demonic Magic; (Note: As Hanni.) as well as Jacques Collin de Plancy Dictionnaire Infernal,

Amy is described as a President, appearing initially as a flame before turning to a human form. He is claimed to teach astronomy and liberal arts, give familiars, incite positive reactions from rulers, and (according to all sources except the Munich Manual) reveal treasures. According to all sources, he rules over 36 legions of demons. According to Johann Weyer, he was of both the order of angels and potestates (powers), and holds the futile hope of returning to the seventh heaven after 12 centuries. According to Rudd, Amy is opposed by the Shem HaMephorash angel Ieialel.

== In popular culture ==
Amy (Kiriwo) is an antagonistic character from the anime and manga series Welcome to Demon School! Iruma-kun.
