= Konrad Bollstatter =

Konrad Bollstatter, also known as Konrad Müller (born in the 1420s, died 1482/1483) was a professional scribe of Augsburg, employed in chancelleries in Öttingen and Höchstädt. He is notable for his informed and erudite treatment of his source texts, often inserting additions for the benefit of his learned readers.

He is known as the scribe of the following manuscripts:

1. Cgm 312
2. Cgm 252
3. Cgm 213
4. Heidelberg Cpg 4
5. Wolfenbüttel Cod. Guelf. 75.10 Aug. 2°
6. Wolfenbüttel Cod. Guelf. 37.17 Aug. 2°
7. Berlin Mgf 564
8. Berlin Mgf 722
9. Prague national museum Cod. XVI.A.6
10. London BL Add. 16581
11. Cgm 463
12. Cgm 758
13. Cgm 735
14. Cgm 7366
15. part of the Älteres öttingisches Lehenbuch, Harburg
16. Alba Iulia Ms. I.115
17. Augsburg Stadtarchiv Schätze 19
18. Augsburg Stadtarchiv 121
19. extensions to Cgm 568
