= Adolphe Franck =

French philosopher and professor

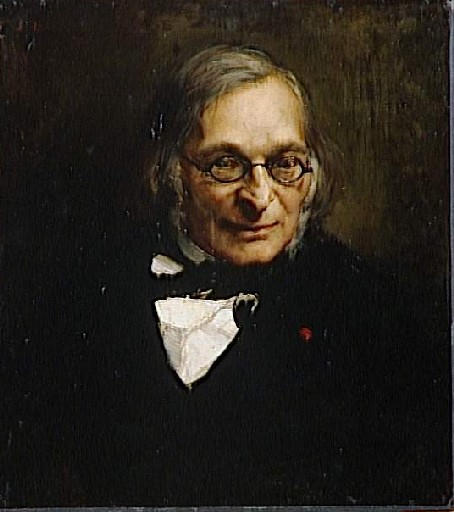
- Portrait of Adolphe Franck by Jules Bastien-Lepage, 1878
- Born: 1809
- Died: 11 March 1893

Philosophical work
- Region: France
- Institutions: Collège de France (1854–1881)
- Main interests: Jewish mysticism
- Notable works: La kabbale, ou, La philosophie religieuse des Hébreux

Adolphe Franck (1809 – 11 March 1893) was a French-Jewish philosopher who specialised in Jewish mysticism.

== Early life ==
Franck was born in Liocourt in 1809. He originally studied to become a rabbi, but decided to become a philosopher instead as a protégé of Victor Cousin.

== Academic career ==
Franck was the first French Jew to receive an agrégation in philosophy, and had a successful academic career. He was a professor for "Droit de las nature et des gens" from 1854 until 1881 at the Collège de France.

His most famous work was La kabbale, ou, La philosophie religieuse des Hébreux (The Kabbalah, or, the Religious Philosophy of the Hebrews), an 1843 work concerning Kabbalah and Jewish mysticism. He also edited an 1800-page dictionary called Dictionnaire des Sciences Philosophiques in 1844, and translated the Zohar into French.

He served as president of the Société des Etudies Juives (Society of Jewish Studies) and was a frequent contributor of the Archives Israélites journal. At the age of 36, Franck was accepted into the Académie des Sciences Morales et Politiques.

== Mysticism ==
Franck was a strong opponent of atheism, favouring the study of mystics and alchemists, such as Paracelsus and Martinez de Pasqually. Towards the end of his life, he made close friends with Gérard Encausse, the founder of neo-Martinism.

== Peace activism ==
Franck was involved with the European peace movement as the president of Frédéric Passy's Société Française des Amis de la Paix (French Society of Friends of Peace) and a supporter of international arbitration efforts.

== Selected works ==
- La kabbale, ou, La philosophie religieuse des Hébreux (in French). Hachette. 1843. ISBN 9780524040256.
