= Bifrons (demon) =

Demon in the Lesser Key of Solomon

Seal of Bifrons (Ars Goetia)

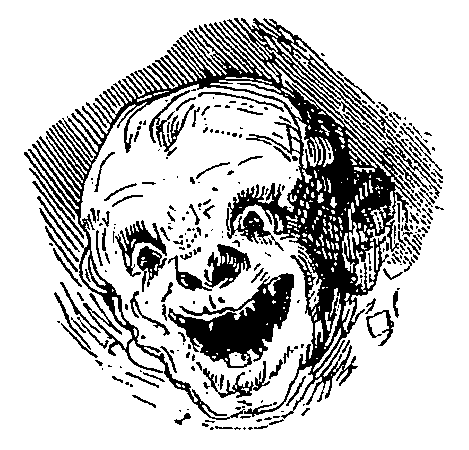
Bifrons. An illustration from the “Dictionnaire Infernal” (1863).

Bifrons is a demon described in the demonological grimoires the Lesser Key of Solomon (as the forty-sixth spirit) and the Pseudomonarchia Daemonum (as the forty-seventh spirit), as well as being mentioned in the Dictionnaire Infernal. These works describe Bifrons as an earl who initially appears as a monster before adopting a more human form. His duties include teaching arts and sciences, including astrology, geometry, and the properties of different plants and stones. He also moves bodies into different graves, lights candles over graves, and (depending on the version) commands either 6, 26, or 60 legions of spirits.

The word "bifrons" literally means "two-faced" in Latin, and is also a prominent epithet of the ancient Roman god Janus, which suggests that Bifrons may be a corrupted and demonized form of Janus. According to Rudd, Bifrons is opposed by the Shemhamphorasch angel Ariel. The illustration of Bifrons in the Dictionnaire Infernal is probably inspired from Duendecitos (Hobgoblins), an etching by the Spanish artist Francisco Goya. This piece is a part of his series Los Caprichos, published in 1799. The artwork satirizes Spanish society, specifically targeting the clergy with grotesque figures, and explores themes of superstition, greed, and violence.
