= De Arte Cabalistica =

1517 Christian text by Johann Reuchlin

De Arte Cabbalistica (Latin for On the Art of Kabbalah) is a 1517 text by the German Renaissance humanist scholar Johann Reuchlin, which deals with his thoughts on Kabbalah. In it, he puts forward the view that the theosophic philosophy of Kabbalah could be of great use in the defence of Christianity and the reconciliation of science with the mysteries of faith. It builds on his earlier work De Verbo Mirifico.

== See also ==
- Humanist Latin
- Scholasticism

== Modern Edition ==
Johann Reuchlin, On the Art of Kabbalah (De Arte Cabalistica), transl. by Martin and Sarah Goodman Introduction by G. Lloyd Jones, Introduction to this edition by Moshe Idel, University of Nebraska Press 1993.
