= Jacques Collin de Plancy =

French demonologist and writer (1793–1881)

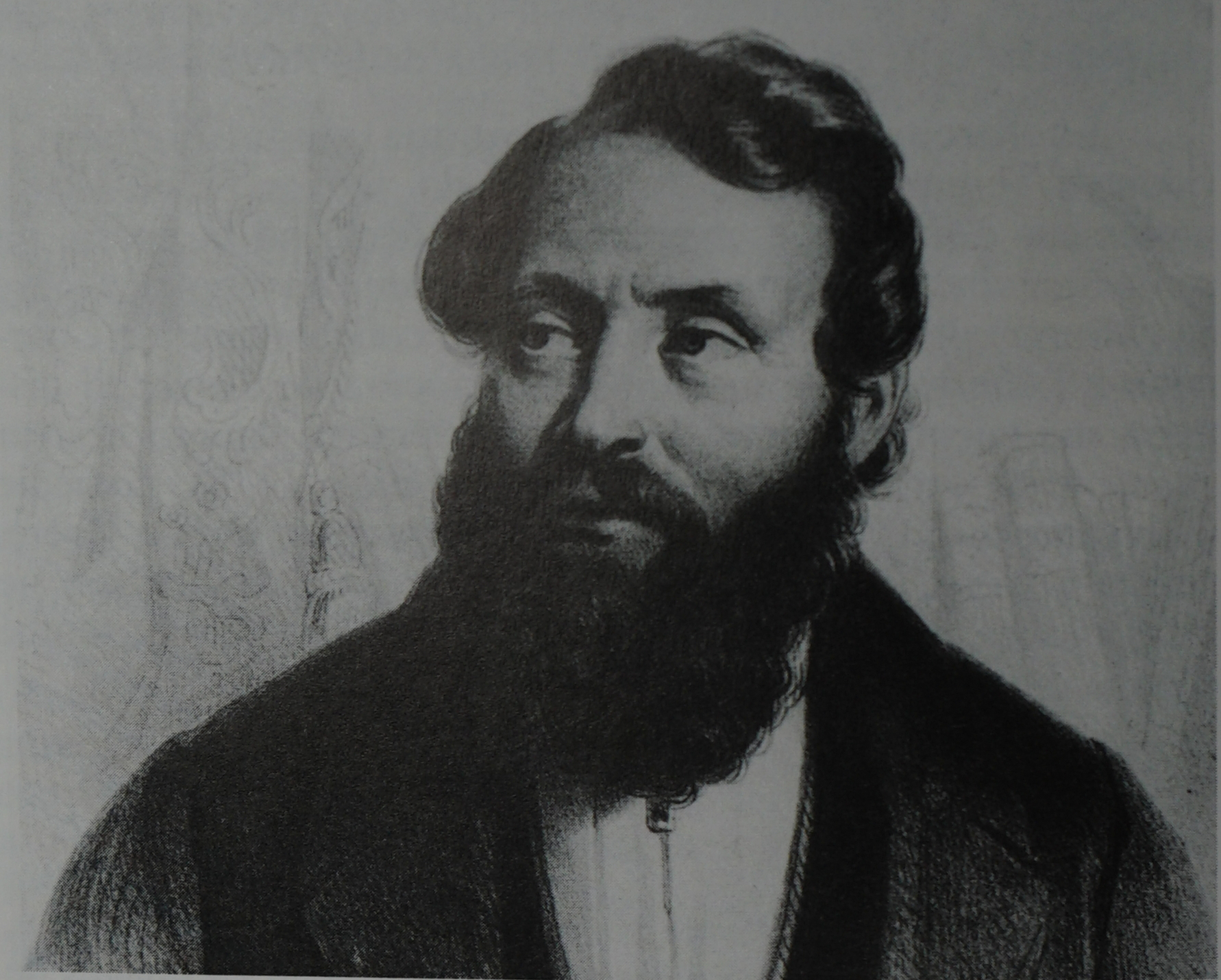
- Born: 28 January 1793; Plancy-l'Abbaye, French First Republic
- Died: January 13, 1881 (aged 87); Paris, French Third Republic
- Occupations: Occultist, author, demonologist
- Writing career
- Genres: Occultism, Demonology
- Movements: Occultism, Fantastique

Jacques Albin Simon Collin de Plancy (28 January 1793 in Plancy-l'Abbaye – 13 January 1881 in Paris) was a French occultist, demonologist and writer. He published several works on occultism and demonology.

== Biography ==
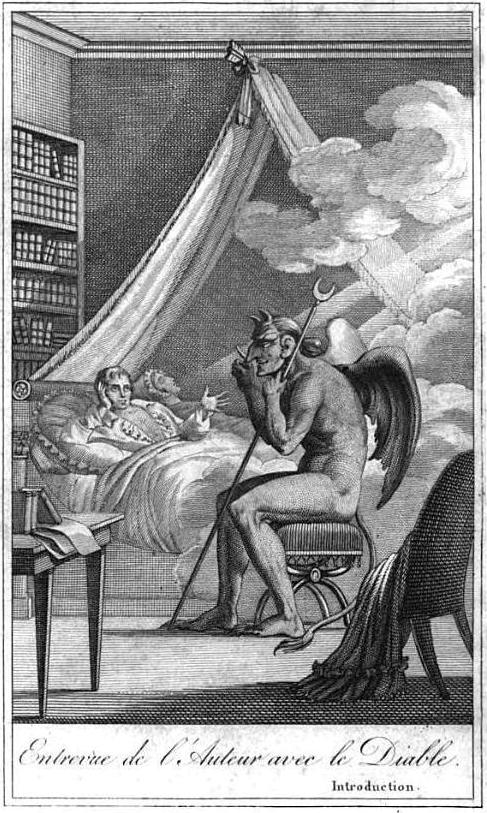
Illustration from Diable peint par lui-même (1825) depicting Collin de Plancy, reclining on his bed, having a discussion with the devil.

He was born Jacques Albin Simon Collin on 28 (in some sources 30) January 1793 in Plancy (presently Plancy-l'Abbaye), the son of Edme-Aubin Collin and Marie-Anne Danton, the sister of Georges Danton who was executed the year after Jacques was born. He later added the aristocratic de Plancy himself – an addition which later caused accusations against his son in his career as a diplomat. He was a free-thinker influenced by Voltaire. He worked as a printer and publisher in Plancy-l'Abbaye and Paris. Between 1830 and 1837, he resided in Brussels, and then in the Netherlands, before he returned to France after having converted to Catholicism.

Collin de Plancy followed the tradition of many previous demonologists of cataloguing demons by name and title of nobility, as it happened with grimoires like Pseudomonarchia Daemonum and The Lesser Key of Solomon. In 1818, his best known work, Dictionnaire Infernal, was published. In 1863, some images were added that made it famous: imaginative drawings concerning the appearance of certain demons.

It is considered a major work documenting beings, characters, books, deeds and causes which pertain to the manifestations and magic of trafficking with Hell; divinations, occult sciences, grimoires, marvels, errors, prejudices, traditions, folktales, and various superstitions from around the world.

By the end of 1830, he ostensibly became an enthusiastic Catholic, much to the confusion of his former admirers and detractors. In 1846, he published a two-volume work entitled Dictionnaire Sciences Occultes et des Idées superstitieuses, another listing of demons. The set cost 16 francs.

Jacques Collin de Plancy was the father of Victor Collin de Plancy (1853–1924), who, for nearly a decade, starting in 1884, was French Minister to Korea and whose collected art works and books became part of the core of the Korean collections of the French Bibliothèque Nationale and the Musée Guimet in Paris.

== Bibliography ==
Original name	Translated	Date	Size/other
Dictionnaire Infernal	Infernal Dictionary	1818	582 pages
Le Diable Peint par Lui-Même; ou, Galerie de petits romans, de contes bizarres, d'anecdotes prodigieuses sur les aventures des demons, les traits qui les caracterisent, leurs bonnes qualités et leurs infortunes; les bons mots et les reponses singulieres qu'on leur attribue; leurs amours, et les services qu'ils out pu rendre aux mortels, etc., etc., etc.	The Devil Painted by Himself, or, a Gallery of small novels, bizarre tales, prodigious anecdotes about the adventures of demons, the traits that characterize their good qualities and their misfortunes, the right words and the answers that singular their attributes, their loves, and the services they have rendered out to mortals, etc., etc., etc.	1819	318 pages
Dictionnaire féodal ou recherches et anecdotes sur les Dimes et les droits féodaux, les fiefs et les bénéfices, les privilèges etc. et sur tout ce qui tient à la Féodalité.	Feudal Dictionary, or, Research and Anecdotes on the Feudal Dimes and Rights, Strongholds and Benefices, Preferences etc. and on Everything Pertaining to Feudalism.	1819	-
Dictionnaire critique des reliques et des images miraculeuses	Critical Dictionary of Relics and Miraculous Images	1821	3 books, 450, 470 and 416 pages
Voyage au centre de la Terre	Voyage to the Centre of the Earth	1821	-
Traité des reliques de Jean Calvin	Treatise on the Relics by Jean Calvin	1822	-
Histoire du Manneken Pis racontée par lui-même	History of Manneken Pis told by Himself	1824	Lacrosse, Bruxelles
Biographie pittoresque des Jésuites ou Notices abrégées théologiques et historiques sur les jésuites célèbres	A Picturesque Biography on the Jesuits or Theological and Historical Shortened Notes on the famous Jesuits	1826	110 pages
Fastes militaires des Belges	Military Record of the Belgians	1835–1836	4 volumes
Légendes de l'histoire de France II	Legends of French History II	1850	-
Godefroid de Bouillon, chroniques et légendes du temps des deux premières croisades, 1095-1180	Godfrey de Bouillon, chronicles and legends of the time of the first two Crusades, 1095–1180	1842	479 pages
Légendes de la Sainte Vierge	Legends of the Blessed Virgin	1845	392 pages
Légendes de l'Histoire de France	Legends of French History	1846	386 pages
La chronique de Godefroid de Bouillon et du royaume de Jérusalem. Première et deuxième croisade (1080-1187) avec l'histoire de Charles-le-Bon...	The Chronicle of Godfrey de Bouillon, and the kingdom of Jerusalem. First and Second Crusades (1080–1187) with the history of Charles the Good...	1848	-
La Reine Berthe au grand pied	Queen Bertha with the Large Foot	1854	274 pages
Légendes des commandements de l'Eglise	Legends of the Church's Commandments	1860	396 pages
Légendes des sacrements	Legends of the Sacraments	1860	396 pages
Légendes des femmes dans la vie réelle	Legends of Women in Real Life	1861	412 pages, Henri Plon, Paris
Légendes de l'ancien testament, recueillies des apocryphes, des rabins et des légendaires, distinguées avec soin des textes sacrés	Legends of the Old Testament, collected apocryphal books, Rabbinical and legendary ones, distinguished carefully from the crowned texts	1861	396 pages
Légendes Infernales, relations et pactes des hôtes de l'enfer avec l'espèce humaine.	Infernal legends, tales and pacts of the hosts of Hell with the mankind.	1861	-
Légendes de l'autre monde, pour servir à l'histoire du paradis, du purgatoire et de l'enfer, avec quelques esquisses de personnages peu soucieux de leur âme	Legends of the other world, to serve as a history of Paradise, Purgatory and Hell, with some drafts of characters unconcerned with their soul	1862	396 pages
La Vie et les légendes intimes des deux empereurs Napoléon Ier et Napoléon II jusqu'à l'avénement de Napoléon III	The Intimate Life and the Legends of the two Emperors Napoleon I and Napoleon II until the coming of Napoleon III	1863	411 pages
Légendes du calendrier	Legends of the Calendar	1863	396 pages
Légendes du juif errant et des seize reines de Munster	Legends of the wandering Jew and the sixteen queens of Munster	1866	393 pages
Légendes des commandements de Dieu	Legends of the Commandments of God	1864	396 pages
Légendes des sept péchés capitaux	Legends of the Seven deadly sins	1864	396 pages
Légendes des douze convives du chanoine de Tours	Legends of the twelve guests of the chanoine de Tours	1864	396 pages
Taxes des parties casuelles de la boutique du pape pour la remise, moyennant argent, de tous les crimes et pêchés	-	1871	82 pages
La fin des temps, confirmée par des prophéties authentiques nouvellement recueillies	End of time, confirmed by authentic prophecies lately collected	1871	211 pages
La vie du cure J. Meslier d'après Voltaire	Life of the Curate J. Meslier according to Voltaire	1871	-
Recherches sur l'alimentation des reptiles et des batraciens de France	Research on the food of the reptiles and the batrachians of France	1876	-
Catalogue des reptiles et batraciens du département de l'Aube et étude sur la distribution géographique des reptiles et batraciens de l'est de la France	Catalogue of reptiles and batrachians of the department of Aube and study on the geographical distribution of the reptiles and batrachians of the east of France	1878	44 pages
Légendes des esprits et des démons qui circulent autour de nous	Legends of the spirits and the demons which circulate around us	-	396 pages
Le docteur Péperkouk	Doctor Péperkouk	-	-
Légendes des origines	Legends of Origins	-	412 pages
Légendes des vertus théologales et des vertus cardinales	Legends of the theological virtues and the cardinal virtues	-	396 pages
Traditions populaires et anecdotes insolites : Légendes infernales	Popular traditions and strange anecdotes: Infernal legends	-	-
Légendes du Moyen Âge	Legends of the Middle Ages	-	396 pages
