= Thomas Rudd =

English military engineer and mathematician

Thomas Rudd (c.1583–1656) was an English military engineer and mathematician.

== Life ==
The eldest son of Thomas Rudd of Higham Ferrers, Northamptonshire, he was born in 1583 or 1584. He served during his earlier years as a military engineer in the Low Countries. On 10 July 1627, King Charles I appointed him ‘chief engineer of all castles, forts, and fortifications within Wales,’ at a salary of £240 per annum. Subsequently, he was appointed the King's principal engineer for fortifications, and in 1635 he visited Portsmouth in this capacity to settle a question between the governor and the admiralty as to the removal of some naval buildings which interfered with proposed fortifications. In 1638, he visited Guernsey and Jersey at the request of the governors, Charles Danvers, Earl of Danby and Sir Thomas Jermyn, to survey the castles on those islands and report upon them to the board of ordnance.

In February of the following year, Rudd petitioned the board of ordnance for the payment of arrears of salary; in June, the board recommended the petition to the council, mentioning Rudd's services. In April, having been employed in making a survey of the Portsmouth defences, he recommended that they should be reconstructed at an estimated cost of £4,956. In June, Rudd went to Dover to superintend the repairs to the harbour and to the Archcliffe bulwark or fort, and in October he reported to the council that the works were delayed for want of funds, and suggested that the revenues of the harbour, as well as the dues, should be devoted to the maintenance of the harbour and fort. To this, the council assented on 29 May 1640, and on 31 December following directed all mayors, sheriffs, and justices to impress workmen in and about London and elsewhere for the works at Dover, which had been entrusted to Rudd.

In October 1640, Rudd went to Portsmouth to finish the fortifications, on the special application of Colonel Goring, the governor, and he divided his attention during 1641 between Portsmouth and Dover. The work at Portsmouth was retarded for want of funds, and in January 1642 the governor demanded stores, and leave to use materials for fortification, according to Rudd's survey of the previous year.

Rudd served as chief engineer on the Royalist side throughout the First English Civil War, and in 1655, his estate at Higham Ferrers was decimated on an assessment for the payment of the militia, as a punishment for his adherence to the Royalist cause. He died in 1656, aged 72, and was buried in Higham Ferrers church, where several epitaphs composed by himself were inscribed on his tomb.

== Works ==
Rudd put his name to two texts on geometry, Practical Geometry, in two parts (London, 1650), and an edition of Euclid's Elements under the title Euclides Elements of Geometry, the first six Books in a compendious form contrasted and demonstrated, whereunto is added the Mathematical Preface of Mr. John Dee (London, 1651), but both works show extensive appropriation (without attribution) from Dutch sources of the early 1600s. In particular, Rudd's selection of a hundred questions is largely, but not exclusively, culled from the compilation of Sybrandt Hanszoon van Harlingen (Cardinael) (1578–1647), Hondert Geometrische Questien [A Hundred Geometrical Problems], published c. 1612.

He wrote the supplement to The Compleat Body of the Art Military, by Lieutenant-colonel Richard Elton, London, 1650; 2nd edit. 1659. This supplement consists of six chapters, dealing with the duties of officers, the marching of troops and the art of gunnery. Sir James Turner, in his Pallas Armata (1683), refers to another work by Rudd on sieges; but this cannot now be traced.

- T. Rudd, Practical Geometry, in Two Parts: The first, Shewing how to perform four Species of Arithmetick, (viz. Addition, Subtraction, Multiplication, and Division,) together with Reduction, and the Rule of Proportion in figures. The Second, Containing A Hundred Geometrical Questions, with their Solutions and Demonstrations, some of them being performed Arithmetically, and others Geometrically, yet all without the help of algebra. A Worke very necessary for all Men, but principally for Surveyors of Land, Engineers, and all other Students in the Mathematicks. (Printed by Robert Leybourn for Robert Boydell and Samuel Satterthwaite, London, 1650); available at Early English Books.

=== Occult ===
Rudd has been claimed as an occultist. Peter J. French writes that he was "steeped in hermeticism" and an admirer of Dee's Monas Hieroglyphica. Among the Harleian manuscripts is a hermetic treatise that has been attributed to Rudd. According to The Goetia of Dr. Rudd by occult author Stephen Skinner and David Rankine, Rudd was at the centre of a group of angel magicians.

== Family ==
Rudd was married three times:

- first, to Elizabeth, daughter of Robert Castle of Glatton, Huntingdonshire;
- secondly, to Margaret, daughter of Edward Doyley of Overbury Hall, Suffolk;
- and thirdly, to Sarah, daughter of John Rolt of Milton Ernes, Bedfordshire.

He left an only daughter, Judith, by his third wife; she married, first a kinsman, Anthony Rudd, and secondly, Goddard Pemberton, and died on 23 March 1680.
