= List of Welcome to Demon School! Iruma-kun chapters =

Welcome to Demon School! Iruma-kun has been serialized in Akita Shoten's shōnen manga magazine Weekly Shōnen Champion since March 2, 2017. Akita Shoten has collected its chapters into individual tankōbon volumes. The first volume was released on July 7, 2017. As of October 2026, fifty-one volumes have been released.

== Volume list ==
No.	Title	Original release date	English release date
1	Welcome to Demon School	July 7, 2017; 978-4-253-22516-8	May 2, 2023; 978-1-64729-242-3
001. Iruma at Demon School (悪魔学校の入間くん, Akuma gakkō no Iruma-kun); 002. Summoning a Familiar! ("使い魔"召喚！, "Tsukaima" shōkan!); 003. Iruma and Clara (入間とクララ, Iruma to Kurara); 004. Demon Friends (悪魔のお友達, Akuma no o tomodachi); 005. The Misfit Class (問題児(アブノーマル)クラス, Abunōmaru kurasu); 006. Flying Race! Ready, Set, Go! (飛行レース開始(スタート)！, Hikō rēsu sutāto!); 007. The One Who Wishes to be Demon King (魔王を目指す者, Maō o mezasu mono)
2	Comical Rendezvous	October 6, 2017; 978-4-253-22517-5	June 13, 2023; 978-1-64729-243-0
008. The Gluttonous Feeder Ring (悪食の指輪, Akujiki no yubiwa); 009. Let's All Take Magic Classes! (みんなで魔術授業!, Minna de majutsu jugyō!); 010. Ameri's Theory (アメリの仮説, Ameri no kasetsu); 011. First Love Memories (初恋メモリー, Hatsukoi memorī); 012. Iruma's Dream (入間の"夢", Iruma no "yume"); 013. Iruma's Decision (入間の決意, Iruma no ketsui); 014. Intense Efforts (高鳴る努力, Takanaru doryoku); 015. Fierce battle! Execution cannonball!! (激闘、処刑玉砲!!, Gekitō, shokei gyoku-hō!!); 016. The First Step! (踏み出す一歩!, Fumidasu ippo!)
3	A New Challenge	December 8, 2017; 978-4-253-22518-2	August 15, 2023; 978-1-64729-253-9
017. Horns over Heels for Clara (クララにメロメロ, Kurara ni mero mero); 018. The Battler Challenge (師団(バトラ)の挑戦, Batora no chōsen); 019. The Rookie Hunt ♡ (1年生争奪戦♡(ルーキーハント), Rūkī Hanto); 020. The Demon with no Magic (魔力がない悪魔, Maryoku ga nai akuma); 021. The Magical Apparatus Research Battler (魔具研究師団(バトラ), Ma-gu kenkyū batora); 022. My Familiar and Me ♪ (使い魔といっしょ♪, Tsukaima to issho); 023. The Dinner of the Thirteen Crowns (13冠の集い(サーティーン・ディナー), Sātīn dinā); 024. The Battler Showcase (師団(バトラ)のお披露目, Batora no o hirome); 025. Demons in Prep (準備する者たち, Junbi suru mono-tachi)
4	Let the Party Begin	February 8, 2018; 978-4-253-22519-9	November 7, 2023; 978-1-64729-254-6
026. Kiriwo's Hidden Room (キリヲの隠し部屋, Kiriwo no kakushibeya); 027. The Perfect Pair (似た者どうし, Nita mono-dōshi); 028. The Pre-Party Begins (前夜祭の始まり, Zen'yasai no hajimari); 029. Bottled Up Ambition (溜め込んだ野心, Tamekonda yashin); 030. Kiriwo's Maze (キリヲの迷路, Kiriwo no meiro); 031. Captain Clara and Commander Azz (クララ兵隊長とアズ指揮官, Kurara heitai-chō to Azu shiki-kan); 032. Deepest Desire (心から望むもの, Kokoro kara nozomu mono); 033. The Look of Despair (絶望の表情, Zetsubō no kao); 034. Magic Unleashed (魔力の解放, Maryoku no kaihō)
5	Fickle Flash of Flame	May 8, 2018; 978-4-253-22520-5	December 26, 2023; 978-1-64729-255-3
035. I Won't Give Up Anything (全部拾いたい, Zenbu hiroitai); 036. Family Time (家族との時間, Kazoku to no jikan); 037. Glorious Awards (栄えある表彰, Hae aru hyōshō); 038. Handling a Human (人間の処遇, Ningen no shogū); 039. Soul Food Battle!! (真心料理バトル！！, Magokoro ryōri batoru!!); 040. Kuromu the Dem-dol! (アクドルくろむちゃん！, Akudoru Kuromu-chan!); 041. By Accident (つい、うっかり, Tsui, ukkari); 042. A Shock of Sparkles (キラキラの衝撃, Kirakira no shōgeki); 043. For Someone Else's Sake (誰かのために, Dare ka no tame ni)
6	Diabolical Designs	July 6, 2018; 978-4-253-22548-9	February 20, 2024; 978-1-64729-256-0
044. On Using Magic (魔術の使い方, Majutsu no tsukai kata); 045. The Secret of the Ring (指輪の秘密, Yubiwa no himitsu); 046. Ameri's Decision (アメリの決断, Ameri no ketsudan); 047. The Draconian Student Council President (鬼の生徒会, Oni no seito-kai); 048. A Crumbling Heroine (崩れる女傑, Kuzureru joketsu); 049. The Maiden Demon (乙女な悪魔, Otome na akuma); 050. The Charismatic Ronove (カリスマのロノウェ, Karisuma no ronowe); 051. Overflowing Feelings (こぼれる想い, Koboreru omoi); 052. The Student Council President's View (生徒会長の眺め, Seito kaichō no nagame)
7	Introducing Irumean	September 7, 2018; 978-4-253-22549-6	April 2, 2024; 978-1-64729-257-7
053. A New Ambition (新たな野望, Arata na yabō); 054. The Inverse Iruma (正反対の入間, Seihantai no Iruma); 055. The King's Classroom: The Royal One (王の教室(ロイヤル・ワン), Roiyaru wan); 056. The Misfit Classmates (問題児(アブノーマル)な同級生(クラスメイト), Abunōmaru na kurasumeito); 057. The Teachers of Babyls (悪魔学校(バビラス)の教師たち, Babirasu no kyōshi-tachi); 058. Outstanding Demons (優れた悪魔, Sugureta akuma); 059. The Fools' Miracle (道化師の奇跡, Dōke-shi no kiseki); 060. Derkila's Relic (デルキラの遺物, Derukira no ibutsu); 061. A Promising Future (待ち望む未来, Machinozomu mirai)
8	A Tricky Test	November 8, 2018; 978-4-253-22550-2	June 4, 2024; 978-1-64729-258-4
062. Studying in the Netherworld (魔界のお勉強, Makai no o benkyō); 063. Balam's Class (バラムの授業, Baramu no jugyō); 064. A Shocking Revelation (衝撃の事実, Shōgeki no jijitsu); 065. The Joys of Learning (学びの楽しさ, Manabi no tanoshi-sa); 066. The End-of-Terminus Exam (終末テスト, Shūmatsu tesuto); 067. Girls' Talk (ガールズトーク, Gāruzu tōku); 068. Mr. Kalego's Home Visits (カルエゴ先生の家庭訪問, Karuego sensei no katei hōmon); 069. How to Spend your End of Terminus (終末日の過ごし方, Shūmatsu hi no sugoshi kata); 070. Walter Park (ウォルターパーク, Worutā pāku)
9	Party at Walter Park	February 8, 2019; 978-4-253-22559-5	August 13, 2024; 978-1-64729-259-1
071. Everyone's Playmates (みんなの遊び相手, Minna no asobi aite); 072. A Penetrating Gaze (するどい眼差し, Surudoi manazashi); 073. The Uraboras Prison (ウラボラス監獄, Uraborasu kangoku); 074. The Six Fingers' Plan (六指衆の計画, Musashino-shū no keikaku); 075. The Magical Beasts Attack (魔獣襲撃, Majū shūgeki); 076. Reliable Allies (頼れる背中, Tayoreru senaka); 077. The Name of this Feeling (この感情の名前は, Kono kanjō no namae wa); 078. A Big Brother's Pride (アニキとしての矜持, Aniki to shite no kyōji); 079. The Piercing Screech of Victory (勝利を喚ぶ轟音, Shōri o yobu gōon)
10	Babyls Bravehearts	April 8, 2019; 978-4-253-22560-1	October 8, 2024; 978-1-64729-260-7
080. What's More Powerful? (どっちが強い？, Docchi ga tsuyoi?); 081. The Totally Invincible Maiden (最強無敵の乙女, Saikyō muteki no otome); 082. Dueling Demons (勝負する2人, Shōbu suru futari); 083. The Ultimate Halberd (最強の矛, Saikyō no hoko); 084. The Gargoyle Bares His Fangs (牙を剥く守護神(ガーゴイル), Kiba o muku gāgoiru); 085. One Final Struggle (最後のあがき, Saigo no agaki); 086. My Ambition (僕の欲, Boku no yoku); 087. Fated Enemies (運命の天敵, Unmei no teki); 088. Shine Bright (キラキラと, Kirakira to)
11	Rollicking Recreation	June 7, 2019; 978-4-253-22891-6	December 3, 2024; 978-1-64729-261-4
089. Clara's Home (クララのお家, Kurara no o uchi); 090. The Sabbath (サバト, Sabato); 091. Demonic Manners (悪魔の礼儀, Akuma no reigi); 092. Magical Street (マジカルストリート, Majikaru sutorīto); 093. The Ruler of the Netherworld (魔界を統べる者, Makai o suberu mono); 094. Dream Date (夢見るデート, Yume miru deito); 095. The Misfit Class Starts a New Term (問題児(アブノーマル)クラスの新学期, Abunōmaru kurasu no shin gakki); 096. The Instructors' Plans (講師陣のプラン, Kōshi-jin no puran); 097. Bachiko (バチコ, Bachiko)
12	Off to the Harvest	September 6, 2019; 978-4-253-22892-3	February 4, 2025; 978-1-64729-413-7
098. Horror Stories (おぞましい話, Ozomashī hanashi); 099. A Weapon Unfit For a Demon (悪魔に向かない武器, Akuma ni mukanai buki); 100. Iruma's Deepest Desire (入間の本音, Iruma no honne); 101. Expectations Exceeded (素晴らしい生徒達, Subarashī seito-tachi); 102. Before and After (Before→After); 103. The Harvest Festival Begins With a Bang (収穫祭の狼煙, Shūkaku-sai no noroshi); 104. Stiff Competition (ツワモノ揃い, Tsuwamono zoroi); 105. Devious Demons (狡猾な悪魔, Kōkatsu na akuma); 106. A Deal With the Devil (悪魔の駆け引き, Akuma no kakehiki)
13	Tastiest Festival Ever	October 8, 2019; 978-4-253-22893-0	April 1, 2025; 978-1-64729-414-4
107. High on Survival (サバイバル・ハイ, Sabaibaru Hai); 108. The Ultimate Temptress (魔性のピュア, Mashō no pyua); 109. Clara's Toy Box (クララのおもちゃ箱, Kurara no omochabako); 110. A Night Full of Screams (叫び声の響く夜, Sakebigoe no hibiku yoru); 111. 100 Comrades (お仲間100人できるかな, O nakama hyaku-nin dekiru ka na); 112. Bragging Rights (自慢の弟子たち, Jiman no deshi-tachi); 113. The Dorodoro Brothers' Challenge (ドロドロ兄弟の挑発, Dorodoro kyōdai no chōhatsu); 114. Master of The Battlefield (戦場の師匠, Senjō no shishō); 115. Azz's Evil Cycle (悪周期のアズ, Aku shūki no azu)
14	A Long-shot Bet for the Upset	December 6, 2019; 978-4-253-22894-7	June 3, 2025; 978-1-64729-415-1
116. Going for the Upset (一発逆転の策, Ippatsugyakuten no saku); 117. Keroli, Queen of the Beasts (獣女王(クイーン)ケロリ, Kemono kuīn kerori); 118. The Iruma I Know (私の知るイルマは, Watashi no shiru Iruma wa); 119. The Misfit Hunter (生徒狩り, Seitogari); 120. The Seed Of New Beginnings (始まりのタネ, Hajimari no tane); 121. Toto the Spirit (魔人トートー, Majin tōtō); 122. Time to go Home (帰りましょう, Kaerimashō); 123. The Words Left Unsaid (ずっと言わなかった言葉, Zutto iwanakatta kotoba); 124. Wish Upon a Bow (願いを弓に, Negai o yumi ni)
15	Countdown to the Crown	January 8, 2020; 978-4-253-22895-4	August 5, 2025; 978-1-64729-416-8
125. Young Demon King (若き魔王, Wakaki maō); 126. One-of-a-kind Magic (僕だけの魔術, Boku dake no majutsu); 127. Lied's Struggles (リードの苦悩, Rīdo no kunō); 128. A Broken Heart (乱れるハート, Midareru hāto); 129. Castle Takeover (もらっちゃいましょう, Moracchaimashō); 130. The Battle of the Misfits (問題児(アブノーマル)クラス大戦, Abunōmaru kurasu taisen); 131. Captive to her Charm (色香の虜, Iroka no toriko); 132. Confusion (ざわつく心, Zawatsuku kokoro); 133. An Archer's True Worth (弓使いの真価, Yumitsukai no shinka)
16	Heart-pounding Harvest Festival Finale!	April 8, 2020; 978-4-253-22896-1	October 7, 2025; 978-1-64729-417-5
134. Hopes Entrusted (託される想い, Takusareru omoi); 135. The Harvest Festival Ends (収穫祭の終わり, Shūkaku-sai no owari); 136. The Legendary Leaf (伝説の(レジェンド)リーフ, Rejendo rīfu); 137. Victory (優勝者, Yūshō-sha); 138. The Path to Growth (開花の条件, Kaika no jōken); 139. Praise (褒め言葉, Homekotoba); 140. Welcome Home (お帰り, O kaeri); 141. Between Friends (トモダチへの言葉, Tomodachi e no kotoba); 142. The Big Reveal (タネ明かし, Tane akashi)
17	Let the Music Play!!	June 8, 2020; 978-4-253-22897-8	December 2, 2025; 978-1-64729-418-2
143. Learning to Bake from the Heart!! (真心クッキング教室！, Magokoro kukkingu kyōshitsu!); 144. A Bad Influence (悪友, Akuyū); 145. Teachers' Bash (教師陣の宴, Kyōshi-jin no utage); 146. The Netherworld in Crisis (魔界の揺らぎ, Makai no yuragi); 147. The Forgotten Demon (もう1人の悪魔, Mō hitori no akuma); 148. Soi Purson (プルソン・ソイ, Puruson soi); 149. The Pixie's Song (ピクシーの音, Pikushī no ne); 150. Selfish (ワガママ, Wagamama); 151. The Team of Thirteen Steps Up (13人の挑戦, Jū-san-nin no chōsen)
18	Dance, Demons, Dance!	September 8, 2020; 978-4-253-22898-5	February 3, 2026; 978-1-64729-419-9
152. The Student Council Parade (生徒会の行進(パレード), Seito-kai no parēdo); 153. The Hell Dance (地獄踏み(ヘルダンス), Heru dansu); 154. The Essence of a Dem-Dol (アクドルの真髄, Akudoru no shinzui); 155. Demonic Piano (魔界のピアノ, Makai no piano); 156. Lilith's Carpet (リリス・カーペット, Ririsu kāpetto); 157. Friends (おトモダチ, O tomodachi); 158. The Wooing (求愛, Kyūai); 159. Toward the Future (これからの未来, Korekara no saki); 160. Invisible, But... (見えないけど, Mienaikedo)
19	Take to the stage!!	December 8, 2020; 978-4-253-22899-2	April 7, 2026; 978-1-64729-420-5
161. Compliment Communion (褒め円陣(ミサ), Home misa); 162. An Actual Conversation (おしゃべり, O shaberi); 163. Amduscias (アムドゥスキアス, Amudusukiasu); 164. A Declaration of War (宣戦布告, Sensen fukoku); 165. Showtime! (音楽祭、本番！！, Ongaku-sai, honban!!); 166. The Path You Choose (あなたの選ぶ道, Anata no erabu michi); 167. The Sound of Anticipation (期待の音, Kitai no oto); 168. The Misfit Class Presents: Lilith's Carpet (問題児(アブノーマル)クラス〜リリス・カーペット〜, Abunōmaru kurasu ~Ririsu kāpetto~)
20	The Music Festival Grand Finale!!	March 8, 2021; 978-4-253-22900-5	June 2, 2026; 978-1-64729-421-2
169. The Demon King's Sound (魔王の音, Maō no oto); 170. A Victory Salute (勝利の祝砲, Shōri no shukuhō); 171. Triumphant Celebration (偉業の宴, Igyō no utage); 172. The Thirteen Misfits (13人の問題児(アブノーマル), Jū-san-nin no abunōmaru); 173. The Look in His Eyes (瞳の奥, Hitomi no oku); 174. Demons of Light and Shadow (白と黒の悪魔, Shiro to kuro no akuma); 175. Iruma's Partner (入間の相棒, Iruma no aibō); 176. The Triple Love Squad (大好き軍団(トリオ), Daisuki torio); 177. Two Friends (2人の友, Futari no tomo)
21	The Big 15!!	April 8, 2021; 978-4-253-22911-1	August 4, 2026; 978-1-647-29422-9
178. Best Friend Seminar (シンユー会議, Shin'yū kaigi); 179. A Year Apart (1年間の距離, Ichi-nenkan no kyori); 180. A Centimeter Apart (1センチの距離, Issenchi no kyori); 181. Lied's Flirting Strategy Sesh (リードのイチャコラ会議, Rīdo no ichakora kaigi); 182. Hatchling (ヒナドリ, Hinadori); 183. Iruma Suzuki's Exorcibration (鈴木入間"降魔の儀", Suzuki Iruma "kōma no gi"); 184. A Promise To Keroli (ケロリとの約束, Kerori to no yakusoku); 185. The Dem-dol Games (アクドル大武闘会, Akudoru dai undō-kai); 186. Team Devimuse (チーム『デビムス』, Chīmu "debimusu")
22	Get Ready for the Sizzling-Hot Dem-dol Games!!	June 8, 2021; 978-4-253-22912-8	October 6, 2026; 978-1-647-29423-6
187. Full-Speed Sprint (全力疾走, Zenryoku shissō); 188. Lindy's Mighty Roar (吠えるリンディ, Hoeru Rindi); 189. The All-Powerful, Super-Duper Cute Archer (最強キュートな弓使い, Saikyō kyūto na yumitsukai); 190. The Greedy Tycoon and the Jewel (富豪と宝石, Fugō to hōseki); 191. The Irumi Fan Club (イルミ応援団！！, Irumi ōen-dan!!); 192. Greedy Gyari (欲しがりギャリー, Hoshi-gari Gyarī); 193. Chima Speaks Up (チマの声, Chima no koe); 194. Rock, Demons, Rock (あくまでロック, Akumade rokku); 195. Proud Songstress (傲慢の歌姫, Gōman no utahime)
23	—	August 6, 2021; 978-4-253-22913-5	December 6, 2026; 978-1-647-29424-3
196. Passion in Greed (強欲の情熱, Gōyoku no jōnetsu); 197. Deviler's Eve (月を越して, Tsuki o koshite); 198. The Misfit's Wild Party (問題児(アブノーマル)な無礼講, Abunōmaru na bureikō); 199. Servant of the Demon World (魔界の献身者, Makai no kenshin-sha); 200. A Gathering of Heroes (集いし英傑, Tsudoishi eiketsu); 201. The Three Greats' Grandsons' Meeting (三傑孫会議, San-ketsu mago kaigi); 202. Spice (スパイス, Supaisu); 203. Food for the Young (若葉には大いなる糧を, Wakaba ni wa ōinaru kate o); 204. Beneath the Sunlight (こもれびまたいで, Komorebi mataide)
24	—	November 8, 2021; 978-4-253-22914-2	February 2, 2027; 978-1-64729-425-0
205. Speaking of the Demon King (魔王談義, Maō dangi); 206. The Golden Lions (金獅子たち, Kinjishi-tachi); 207. The Path to Demon King (魔王への道, Maō e no michi); 208. Infiltrating the Teacher's Dorm! (教師寮へ潜入せよ, Kyōshi ryō e sennyū seyo); 209. A New Member (新メンバー, Shin menbā); 210. Like Master, Like Familiar (主に似るは魔界の摂理, Aruji ni niru wa makai no setsuri); 211. Between Friends (親しき仲にも, Shitashiki naka ni mo); 212. From the Masters (師匠より, Shishō yori); 213. The Loveliest Memeto (一番豪華な餞を, Ichiban gōka na hanamuke o)
25	—	January 7, 2022; 978-4-253-22915-9	April 20, 2027; 978-1-64729-666-7
214. Welcome to Babyls! (ようこそ悪魔学校(バビルス)へ, Yōkoso babirusu e); 215. A New Year Starts (新たなる1年, Aratanaru ichi-nen); 216. The Biggest Reason (一番の理由は, Ichiban no riyū wa); 217. Naberius Kalego's 13 Hours: Part 1 (ナベリウス・カルエゴとの13時間前編, Naberiusu karuego to no jū-san-jikan zenpen); 218. Naberius Kalego's 13 Hours: Part 2 (ナベリウス・カルエゴとの13時間中編, Naberiusu Karuego to no jū-san-jikan chūhen); 219. Naberius Kalego's 13 Hours: Final part (ナベリウス・カルエゴとの13時間, Naberiusu Karuego to no jū-san-jikan); 220. A New Piece (新たなるピース, Aratanaru pīsu); 221. Nice to Meet You (はじめまして, Hajimemashite); 222. Talk's End (語らいの末に, Katarai no sue ni)
26	—	April 7, 2022; 978-4-253-22916-6	June 15, 2027; 978-1-64729-667-4
223. The Fledgling Demons Assemble (集う若魔, Tsudou jaku ma); 224. Excited Demons (たかぶる悪魔たち, Takaburu akuma-tachi); 225. Starting Off With A Pop (高らかなる開催の音, Takarakanaru kaisai no oto); 226. For Our Precious Students' Sake (かわいい生徒のためならば, Kawaī seito no tamenaraba); 227. Team Valac (チーム・ウァラク, Chīmu waraku); 228. What My Ability's For (私の能力は, Watashi no nōryoku wa); 229. No Fight If I'm Just Kicking Ass (一蹴されればケンカは起きず, Isshū sa rereba kenka wa okizu); 230. Still Immature (まだまだ未熟, Madamada mijuku); 231. Battle For The Best Spot (ポジションバトル, Pojishonbatoru)
27	—	June 8, 2022; 978-4-253-22917-3	—
232. We're In Your Care (よろしくね, Yoroshiku ne); 233. Hide and Seek (かくれんぼ, Kakurenbo); 234. One With The World (世界の一部, Sekai no ichibu); 235. Eliminated (敗退, Haitai); 236. S.O.S (SOS); 237. The Ideal Team Composition (理想のチーム分け, Risō no chīmu wake); 238. My Special Attack (私の得意技, Watashi no tokui-waza); 239. Culture And Education (教養と教育, Kyōyō to kyōiku); 240. An Ode To Life In Bloom (人生讃花, Jinsei sanka)
28	—	August 8, 2022; 978-4-253-22918-0	—
241. Blue And Purple (青と紫, Ao to murasaki); 242. The Misfits' Choice (問題児(アブノーマル)の決断, Abunōmaru no ketsudan); 243. The Demon: Caim Camui (カイム・カムイという悪魔, Kaimu Kamui to iu akuma); 244. The Love Gap (好きあり, Suki ari); 245. Demons Crying Out Their Love (愛を叫ぶ悪魔たち, Ai o sakebu akuma-tachi); 246. Demonic Backup (悪魔的助太刀, Akuma-teki sukedachi); 247. The Greatest Climax (佳き境目, Yoki sakaime); 248. Lurking Archer (望む弓使い, Nozomu yumitsukai); 249. Fall Seven Times, Stand Up Eight (七転び八起き, Nanakorobiyaoki)
29	—	October 6, 2022; 978-4-253-22919-7	—
250. Carelessness is Your Biggest Nemesis (油断大大敵, Yudan dai taiteki); 251. The Easy Way Out (楽なやり方, Rakuna yarikata); 252. Blind Spot (ふし穴, Fushi ana); 253. Silence and Release (沈黙と解放, Chinmoku to kaihō); 254. Declaration (申し上げます, Mōshiagemasu); 255. Eye to Eye (のぞき合う2人, Nozoki au futari); 256. Seek Evil (悪を求めよ, Aku o motomeyo); 257. The Call of Pain (痛みが呼んでいる, Itami ga yonde iru); 258. Rogue Monster (ピカレスク, Pikaresuku)
30	—	December 8, 2022; 978-4-253-22920-3	—
259. Round Up (召集, Shōshū); 260. Joining Forces (合流, Gōryū); 261. Traitor (裏切り者, Uragirimono); 262. Friend or Foe (敵か味方か, Teki ka mikata ka); 263. Quattro (クワトル, Kuwatoru); 264. The Final Bell (終幕の鐘, Shūmaku no kane); 265. The Survivors (生存者たち, Seizonshatachi); 266. Promoted (昇る悪魔たち, Noboru akuma-tachi); 267. Opening Night (こけら落とし, Kokeraotoshi)
31	—	March 8, 2023; 978-4-253-28331-1	—
268. The Most Popular One (一番の人気者, Ichiban no ninkimono); 269. That Cool Girl (クールなあの娘, Kūru na ano ko); 270. That's Why Ja! (ですんじゃ, Desunja); 271. Looking Ahead (見すえる先は, Misueru saki wa); 272. Gaap Goemon: Part 1 (ガープ・ゴエモン 前編, Gāpu Goemon zenpen); 273. Gaap Goemon: Part 2 (ガープ・ゴエモン 後編, Gāpu Goemon kōhen); 274. Bitter Medicine (万能薬は口に苦し, Ban'nōyaku wa kuchi ni nigashi); 275. Walking a Highwire (綱渡りの立ち位置, Tsunawatari no tachi ichi); 276. As a Teacher (教師として, Kyōshi to shite)
32	—	June 8, 2023; 978-4-253-28332-8	—
277. Opera-sensei (オペラ先生, Opera sensei); 278. Devil Number (悪魔の数字, Akuma no sūji); 279. Let's Get (頂きましょう, Itadakimashō); 280. Participant (参戦者, Sansensha); 281. Hunt Hardship (ハント多難, Hanto Tanan); 282. Reliable Senpai (頼れる先輩たち, Tayoreru senpai-tachi); 283. Destined Encounter (出会いは必然, Deai wa Hitsuzen); 284. Young Hearts (若ものの心, Wakamono no Kokoro); 285. Take My Handkerchief (ハンカチをキミに, Hankachi o Kimi ni)
33	—	July 6, 2023; 978-4-253-28333-5	—
286. Sweet Talk (スイーツな談義, Suītsu na Dangi); 287. Trust and Worry (期待と不安, Kitai to Fuan); 288. Crossing the Line (一線を越えて, Issen o Koete); 289. Two Weeks of Separation (別れの2週間, Wakare no 2 Shūkan); 290. Ladies & Gentlemen (レディース&ジェントルメン, Redīsu & Jentorumen); 291. Matching Faces (揃いの面々, Soroi no Menmen); 292. Dance Dance Dance (ダンスダンスダンス, Dansu Dansu Dansu); 293. Evaluation (品定め, Shinasadame); 294. I Got You (見つけた, Mitsuketa)
34	—	September 7, 2023; 978-4-253-28334-2	—
295. About Seats (席について, Seki ni Tsuite); 296. Stabbing Thorns (刺さる棘, Sasaru Toge); 297. Selfish Snake (我がママな蛇, Waga Mama na Hebi); 298. The Demon I Hate (大嫌いなアイツ, Daikirai na Aitsu); 299. Room For One More (あと1枠, Ato 1 Waku); 300. The 13th Seat (13番目の席, 13 ban-me no Seki); 301. Those Who Step Forward (踏み出す者, Fumidasu Mono); 302. Name of the Hero (英雄の名は, Eiyū no na wa); 303. Night of Illusion (幻夜, Gen'ya)
35	—	December 7, 2023; 978-4-253-28335-9	—
304. You and Me (僕も貴方も, Boku mo Anata mo); 305. To You Who Doesn't Understand Me (私のことを知らない貴方へ, Watashi no Koto o Shiranai Anata e); 306. Unleashed (Opening Ceremony) (解放(テープカット), Tēpu Katto); 307. Smiling at the Memories (思い出に笑って, Omoide ni Waratte); 308. You're a Child (あなたは子供, Anata wa Kodomo); 309. The Center of Attention (気になるあのヒト, Ki ni Naru Ano Hito); 310. An Archer's Claim (弓使いの言い文, Yumi Tsukai no ī bun); 311. An Archer's Wrath (弓使いの怒り, Yumi Tsukai no Ikari); 312. Words I've Always Wanted to Say (ずっと言いたかった言葉, Zutto Ītakatta Kotoba)
36	—	February 7, 2024; 978-4-253-28336-6	—
313. Preparation, Thy Name is Resolve (覚悟という心構え, Kakugo to Iu Kokorogamae); 314. The Joy of Conversation (貴方と話せる幸せに, Anata to Hanaseru Shiawase ni); 315. We Are the Boku-Alliance!! (僕たち僕同盟‼, Boku-tachi Boku Dōmei!!); 316. Nice to Meet You (はじめまして, Hajimemashite); 317. The New Teacher, Momonoki: Part 1 (新人教師モモノキ 前編, Shinjin Kyōshi Momonoki Zenpen); 318. The New Teacher, Momonoki: Part 2 (新人教師モモノキ 後編, Shinjin Kyōshi Momonoki Kōhen); 319. Don't Put It Into Words (言葉にしないで, Kotoba ni Shinaide); 320. It's......!! (だーーー‼︎, Dā!!); 321. So It Was You (あなたでしたか, Anata Deshitaka)
37	—	April 8, 2024; 978-4-253-28337-3	—
322. Beach Season Begins! (海開き, Umi Biraki); 323. The Abilities of a Lord (領主の力量, Ryōshu no Rikiryō); 324. You Are My... (あなたは私の, Anata wa Watashi no); 325. Bouquets and Potted Flowers (花束と鉢植え, Hanataba to Hachiue); 326. Parental Love and a Flower Field (親心と花畑, Oyagokoro to Hanabatake); 327. A Fortunate Person (ぜいたくもの, Zeitaku Mono); 328. Magitools of Terror (恐怖の魔具研, Kyōfu no Maguken); 329. Fear and Excitement (恐怖と興奮, Kyōfu to Kōufun); 330. A Wasted Treasure (持ち腐れた宝, Mochigusareta Takara)
38	—	June 7, 2024; 978-4-253-28338-0	—
331. Strays (はぐれ者たち, Haguremono-tachi); 332. Don't Refuse (断らないで, Kotowara Naide); 333. What I Want (欲しいもの, Hoshī Mono); 334. Piece of Cake (朝メシ前, Asameshi Mae); 335. Sanity or Madness (正気か狂気か, Shōki ka Kyōki ka); 336. Accomplices (共犯者たち, Kyōhansha Tachi); 337. Premonition (予感, Yokan); 338. A Muddy Stream Aflame (燃えて濁流, Moete Dakuryū); 339. A Creator's Cry (創作者(クリエイター)の叫び, Kurieitā no Sakebi)
39	—	September 6, 2024; 978-4-253-28339-7	—
340. Before Anyone Else (誰よりも先に, Dare Yori mo Saki ni); 341. An Outstretched Palm (届く手のひら, Todoku Te no Hira); 342. Beyond the Limit (限界の先へ, Genkai no Saki e); 343. Don't Let Go (はなさない, Hanasanai); 344. I'll Be Your Guide (ご案内します, Go Annai Shimasu); 345. Three Carefree Guests (お気楽3名様, O Kiraku 3 Mei-sama); 346. Opening Day (開館, Kaikan); 347. Welcome to the Moebius Art Museum (メビウス美術館へようこそ, Mebiusu Bijutsu-kan e Yōkoso); 348. The Most Incredible Duo (高評価な2人組, Kō Hyōka na Futari-gumi)
40	—	December 6, 2024; 978-4-253-28340-3	—
349. Where Joy Leads (喜びの行方, Yorokobi no Yukue); 350. Everyone's Own Accolades (それぞれの花道, Sorezore no Hanamichi); 351. To New Lands!! (新天地へ‼︎, Shin Tenchi e!!); 352. Something I Want (ほしいもの, Hoshī Mono); 353. Respect (あおぎみて, Aogimite); 354. Mind Games King (盤外の王, Ban-gai no Ō); 355. I'll Follow You (貴方についていく, Anata ni Tsuite Iku); 356. I'll Come Along (ついてる、私, Tsuiteru, Watashi); 357. Beyond Growth (成長の先に, Seichō no Saki ni)
41	—	February 7, 2025; 978-4-253-28341-0	—
358. Kingmaker (キングメイカー, Kingu Meikā); 359. A Place You Want to Be (居たい場所, Itai Basho); 360. A New Corps (新しい軍団, Atarashī Gundan); 361. An Unheard Voice (きこえない声, Kikoenai Koe); 362. Only I Know (私だけが知っている, Watashi Dake ga Shitte Iru); 363. To the Future We Found (見つけた未来へ, Mitsuketa Mirai e); 364. Were He a King Who Discards (捨てる王あれば, Suteru Ō Areba); 365. Exacting Fangs (厳格なる牙, Genkaku Naru Kiba); 366. Where the Light Pierces (光が刺す場所, Hikari ga Sasu Basho)
42	—	April 8, 2025; 978-4-253-28342-7	—
367. A Dreadful Enemy (恐るべき敵, Osorubeki Teki); 368. Unyielding Convictions (不屈の信念, Fukutsu no Shin'nen); 369. First Cries of the New Generation (新世代の産声, Shin Sedai no Ubugoe); 370. Together Someday (ともにいつか, Tomo ni Itsuka); 371. A Breather (ひといき, Hito Iki); 372. My Delight (私の大好物, Watashi no Dai Kōbutsu); 373. New Meaning (新しいイミ, Atarashī Imi); 374. If You Know, You Know (知るヒトぞ知る, Shiru Hito zo Shiru); 375. A Normal Girl (フツウの女の子, Futsū no Onnanoko)
43	—	June 6, 2025; 978-4-253-28343-4	—
376. A Normal Day Off (普通の休日, Futsū no Kyūjitsu); 377. To You, the Fighter (戦う君へ, Tatakau Kimi e); 378. Side A (サイドA, Saido A); 379. Side B (サイドB, Saido B); 380. Coming Full Circle (一周まわって, Isshū Mawatte); 381. Clara's ♥ (くららの ♥, Kurara no ♥); 382. Search and Rescue (見つけて助けて, Mitsukete Tasukete); 383. In the Pocket's Depths (ポケットの奥に, Poketto no Oku ni); 384. Don't Look (みないで, Minaide)
44	—	August 7, 2025; 978-4-253-28344-1	—
385. Me and I (私とわたし, Watashi to Watashi); 386. Shared Between Three (さんぶんこ, Sanbun ko); 387. Coming Full Circle (一周まわって, Isshū Mawatte); 388. Setting Sail (浸水, Shinsui); 389. Fine Waves (麗らかな波, Uraraka na Nami); 390. True Nature (本性, Honshō); 391. Enough to Drown In (溺れるほどに, Oboreru Hodo ni); 392. Ready, Aim, Fire (狙い撃ち, Nerai Uchi); 393. Towards New History! (新たな歴史へ！, Arata na Rekishi e!)
45	—	October 8, 2025; 978-4-253-00444-2	—
394. Welcome to the Great Annals (偉大なる記録へようこそ, Idai Naru Kiroku e Yōkoso); 395. SS; 396. Just a Habit (つい癖で, Tsui Kuse de); 397. Great Villain (大悪党, Dai Akutō); 398. Taking the Leap (飛躍, Hiyaku); 399. Prepared For It (心の準備, Kokoro no Junbi); 400. If I Catch You (捕まえたなら, Tsukamaeta Nara); 401. Much Left Unsaid (多くは語らず, Ōku wa Katarazu); 402. All Present (出揃う者たち, Desorō Mono-tachi)
46	—	December 8, 2025; 978-4-253-00891-4	—
403. A Thrilling First-Time Experience (出揃う者たち, Doki Doki Hatsu Taiken); 404. You Who Take Everything Away (すべて奪っていくアナタ, Subete Ubatteiku Anata); 405. You'll Dance to My Tune (踊らされて, Odorasarete); 406. My Target Is You (目当てはアナタ, Meate wa Anata); 407. Careless Words (でまかせ, Demakase); 408. Face-to-Face (ご対面, Go Taimen); 409. Onward and Beyond (先へ先へ, Saki e Saki e); 410. Who? (誰だ, Dare da); 411. Giving a Push (背中を押して, Senaka o Oshite)
47	—	February 6, 2026; 978-4-253-01138-9	—
412. Burn (燃やせ, Moyase); 413. Genuine Hell (本当の地獄って, Hontō no Jigokutte); 414. To the Ends of the Netherworld (地獄の果てまで, Jigoku no Hate Made); 415. Finger-to-Finger (指(し)合わせ, Shiawase); 416. Shame on You (恥を知れ, Haji o Shire); 417. Calling and Answering (呼ばれてこたえて, Yobarete Kotaete); 418. This Way Home (お帰りはこちら, Okaeri wa Kochira); 419. Guidepost (道しるべ, Michi Shirube); 420. The Demon Outside (外の悪魔, Soto no Akuma)
48	—	April 8, 2026; 978-4-253-01269-0	—
421. Back From Whence You Came (元の世界へ, Moto no Sekai e); 422. Again Someday (またいつか, Mata Itsuka); 423. Listen (きいて, Kīte); 424. Losing Hesitation (迷いに迷って, Mayoi ni Mayotte); 425. Birds of a Feather (似たもの同志, Nita Mono Dōshi); 426. The Shape of Trust (信頼の形, Shinrai no Katachi); 427. Discussion (はなしあい, Hanashiai); 428. Azazel Henri, Demon (1) (悪魔 アザゼル・アンリ 1, Akuma Azazeru Anri 1); 429. Azazel Henri, Demon (2) (悪魔 アザゼル・アンリ 2, Akuma Azazeru Anri 2)
49	—	June 8, 2026; 978-4-253-01386-4	—
430. Azazel Henri, Demon (3) (悪魔 アザゼル・アンリ 3, Akuma Azazeru Anri 3); 431. Azazel Henri, Demon (4) (悪魔 アザゼル・アンリ 4, Akuma Azazeru Anri 4); 432. Azazel Henri, Demon (5) (悪魔 アザゼル・アンリ 5, Akuma Azazeru Anri 5); 433. Azazel Henri, Demon (6) (悪魔 アザゼル・アンリ 6, Akuma Azazeru Anri 6); 434. Azazel Henri, Demon (7) (悪魔 アザゼル・アンリ 7, Akuma Azazeru Anri 7); 435. Azazel Henri, Demon (8) (悪魔 アザゼル・アンリ 8, Akuma Azazeru Anri 8); 436. Idle Chat (閑談, Kandan); 437. Merize 1 (メリーゼ 1, Merize 1); 438. Merize 2 (メリーゼ 2, Merize 2)
50	—	September 8, 2026; 978-4-253-01935-4; 978-4-253-01939-2 (limited edition)	—
439. Merize 3 (メリーゼ 3, Merize 3); 440. Merize 4 (メリーゼ 4, Merize 4); 441. Merize 5 (メリーゼ 5, Merize 5); 442. Merize 6 (メリーゼ 6, Merize 6); 443. A Ribbon For You (あなたにリボンを, Anata ni Ribon o); 444. Yes, Sensei!! (はい！先生‼, Hai! Sensei!!); 445. Remember (思い出して, Omoidashite); 446. The Dog Officer (犬のおまわりさん, Inu no Omawari-san); 447. Goodbye (さよなら, Sayonara)
51	—	October 7, 2026; 978-4-253-02001-5	—
448. A Request (お願い, Onegai); 449. Help Me (助けて, Tasukete); 450. I'm Begging You (頼む, Tanomu); 451. In the Palm of Your Hand (手の平に乗せて, Te no Hira ni Nosete); 452. Words That Can't Be Said (言えない言葉, Ienai Kotoba); 453. The Same (おそろい, Osoroi); 454. To Where You Are (あなたのところへ, Anata no Tokoro e); 455. Unforgettable (忘れられない, Wasurerarenai); 456. Captive (捕らわれし者, Torawareshi Mono)
52	—	January 7, 2027; 978-4-253-02183-8	—

=== Chapters not yet in tankōbon format ===
- 457. Ascension (下剋上, Gekokujō)
- 458. Scrambling for the Human (人間争奪戦, Ningen Sōdatsusen)
- 459. Reach the Other Side of This Night (この夜を越えて, Kono Yoru o Koete)
- 460. A Message, Filled With Feelings (この想いを込めた乞い文を, Kono Omoi o Kometa Koi Bumi o)
- 461. From Pawn to Knight (歩兵(ポーン)から騎士(ナイト), Pōn kara Naito e)
- 462. Message (伝言ごん, Dengon)
- 463. Delivery (届け, Todoke)
- 464. You, Beyond Reach (高嶺の君, Takane no Kimi)
- 465. To You, Still Out of Sight (まだ見ぬ貴方へ, Mada Minu Anata e)
- 466. Unyielding Conviction (譲れない思い, Yuzurenai Omoi)

== Makai no Shuyaku wa Wareware da! ==
A spin-off manga, titled Makai no Shuyaku wa Wareware da! (魔界の主役は我々だ！; "We Are the Main Characters of the Demon World!"), started serialization in Weekly Shōnen Champion on January 9, 2020. On October 16, 2024, it was announced the series was cancelled due to external circumstances. The first tankōbon volume was released on June 8, 2020. As of June 6th, 2025, twenty-two volumes have been released.

No.	Release date	ISBN
1	June 8, 2020	978-4-253-22268-6
2	September 8, 2020	978-4-253-22269-3
3	December 8, 2020	978-4-253-22270-9
4	March 8, 2021	978-4-253-22273-0
5	April 8, 2021	978-4-253-22274-7
6	August 6, 2021	978-4-253-22275-4
7	November 8, 2021	978-4-253-22278-5
8	January 7, 2022	978-4-253-22429-1
9	April 7, 2022	978-4-253-22430-7
10	August 8, 2022	978-4-253-22432-1
11	October 6, 2022	978-4-253-22434-5
12	December 8, 2022	978-4-253-22435-2
13	March 8, 2023	978-4-253-28383-0
14	June 8, 2023	978-4-253-28384-7
15	September 7, 2023	978-4-253-28385-4
16	December 7, 2023	978-4-253-28386-1
17	February 7, 2024	978-4-253-28387-8
18	June 7, 2024	978-4-253-28388-5
19	September 6, 2024	978-4-253-28389-2
20	December 6, 2024	978-4-253-28390-8
21	February 7, 2025	978-4-253-28391-5
22	June 6, 2025	978-4-253-28392-2

== IruMafia Edition ==
A mafia spin-off (Welcome to Demon School! Iruma-kun: IruMafia Edition) written and illustrated by hiroja began serialization in Bessatsu Shōnen Champion on September 12, 2023. The spin-off's chapters have been compiled into nine tankōbon volumes as of October 2026.

During their panel at New York Comic Con 2024, Kodansha USA announced that they also licensed the mafia spin-off for English publication beginning in Q4 2025.

No.	Original release date	Original ISBN	English release date	English ISBN
1	December 7, 2023	978-4-253-28046-4	August 19, 2025	978-1-64729-467-0
2	June 7, 2024	978-4-253-28047-1	November 11, 2025	978-1-64729-468-7
3	September 6, 2024	978-4-253-28048-8	February 17, 2026	978-1-64729-515-8
4	March 7, 2025	978-4-253-28050-1; 978-4-253-28049-5 (SE)	May 19, 2026	978-1-64729-560-8
5	April 8, 2025	978-4-253-28052-5; 978-4-253-28051-8 (SE)	August 25, 2026	978-1-64729-603-2
6	October 8, 2025	978-4-253-00437-4	November 17, 2026	978-1-64729-639-1
7	February 6, 2026	978-4-253-01144-0	—	—
8	June 8, 2026	978-4-253-01390-1	—	—
9	October 7, 2026	978-4-253-02007-7	—	—

== Kalego Gaiden ==
A 5-chapter spin-off manga centered around Kalego Naberius was serialized in Weekly Shōnen Champion from December 7, 2023, to January 18, 2024.

No.	Original release date	Original ISBN	English release date	English ISBN
1	April 8, 2024	978-4-253-28501-8	—	—
