= Makoto Moriwaki =

Japanese anime director

- Born: Hokkaidō, Japan
- Other name: Nozomu Oshima
- Occupation: anime director

Makoto Moriwaki (森脇真琴, Moriwaki Makoto) is an anime director born in Hokkaidō, Japan. In 1982, Moriwaki founded Animal House (あにまる屋, Animaru-ya) (now known as Ekura Animal (エクラアニマル, Ekura Animaru) with Yoshinobu Sanada, Toshiyuki Honda, and Hiroshi Fukutomi. From the first Doraemon movie produced by Shin'ei Dōga until 1989, she was in charge of production for the movies. She then acted as assistant director for Nobita's Monstrous Underwater Castle and the Kaibutsu-kun movie Demon Sword.

== Projects ==
=== As director ===
- B-PROJECT～Zecchō＊Emotion～
- Gintama: Mr. Ginpachi's Zany Class
- Hime Chen! Otogi Chikku Idol Lilpri
- Highschool! Kimen-gumi Movie
- Hyper Doll
- Jewelpet Kira☆Deco!
- Dorami-chan: Mini-Dora SOS
- Onegai My Melody (and storyboards)
- Onegai! Samia Don
- Oruchuban Ebichu
- PriPara, (and storyboards)
- PriPara Mi~nna no Akogare Let's Go PriPari
- Tantei Opera Milky Holmes
- Welcome to Demon School! Iruma-kun

=== Other ===
- Ashita Tenki ni Nare! (storyboards)
- Chu-Bra!! (storyboards)
- Doraemon: Nobita's Monstrous Underwater Castle (assistant director)
- Doraemon: Nobita's Pirate Hiking (storyboards, episode director)
- Doraemon: Sasuga no Sarutobi (chief in charge of character production)
- Dragon Quest (ep.11 storyboards)
- Kaibutsu-kun: Demon Sword (assistant director)
- Sonic X (storyboards, episode director)
- YAWARA! a fashionable judo girl! (production director)
