= Gintama: Mr. Ginpachi's Zany Class =

Japanese light novel series

- First light novel volume cover

3年Z組銀八先生 (3-Nen Z-Gumi Ginpachi-sensei)
- Genre: Comedy
- Created by: Hideaki Sorachi
- Light novel
- Written by: Tomohito Ōsaki
- Illustrated by: Hideaki Sorachi
- Published by: Shueisha
- Imprint: Jump J-Books
- Original run: February 3, 2006 – present
- Volumes: 10
- Manga

Gintama: 3-Nen Z-Gumi Ginpachi-sensei Touuunn!! (Note: Simply titled Gintama: 3-Nen Z-Gumi Ginpachi-sensei in Jump Square)
- Written by: Ao Suzumemura
- Illustrated by: Yūki Aonuma
- Published by: Shueisha
- Imprint: Jump Comics SQ.
- Magazine: Jump Toon; Jump Square; (January 5, 2026 – present)
- Original run: October 6, 2025 – present
- Volumes: 1
- Anime television series
- Directed by: Makoto Moriwaki (chief); Natsumi Higashida
- Written by: Kazuyuki Fudeyasu; Mitei Mark II
- Music by: Audio Highs
- Studio: BN Pictures
- Licensed by: Crunchyroll; US: Azuki; SA/SEA: Medialink
- Original network: TXN (TV Tokyo)
- Original run: October 7, 2025 – December 23, 2025
- Episodes: 12
- icon

Gintama: Mr. Ginpachi's Zany Class, known in Japan as 3-Nen Z-Gumi Ginpachi-sensei (3年Z組銀八先生; lit. 'Class 3-Z's Teacher Ginpachi') is a Japanese light novel series written by Tomohito Ōsaki, with illustrations by Hideaki Sorachi. It features characters from Sorachi's manga series Gintama transposed to a present day school setting (as opposed to the late Edo period in the parent series), with Gintoki Sakata—here named Ginpachi Sakata—acting as a teacher. The first volume was published by Shueisha in February 2006; ten volumes have been released as of October 2025.

A vertical, full-color digital manga adaptation, titled Gintama: 3-Nen Z-Gumi Ginpachi-sensei Touuunn!!, storyboarded by Ao Suzumemura and illustrated by Yūki Aonuma, started on Shueisha's vertical-scrolling manga service Jump Toon in October 2025, while a horizontal format version, simply titled Gintama: 3-Nen Z-Gumi Ginpachi-sensei, started in Shueisha's shōnen manga magazine Jump Square in January 2026. An anime television series adaptation produced by BN Pictures aired from October to December 2025.

== Premise ==
Ginpachi Sakata, a listless high school teacher with silver, permed hair and a vacant stare, has been assigned to teach Class 3-Z at Ginpachi High School. His class consists of students with extreme personalities, including a stalker, a sadist, an idol enthusiast, and a delinquent. Life in 3-Z is a continuous series of chaotic incidents. Ginpachi rarely takes matters seriously, resolving problems with casual indifference or ignoring them outright. The students do not bond or grow together. Instead, each pursues their own selfish and disruptive behavior without restraint.

== Media ==
=== Light novels ===
Written by Tomohito Ōsaki and illustrated by Hideaki Sorachi, the first novel was published on February 3, 2006. The tenth and latest one was released on October 3, 2025.

==== Volumes ====
No.	Japanese release date	Japanese ISBN
1	February 3, 2006	978-4-08-703164-5
2	July 20, 2007	978-4-08-703181-2
3	July 4, 2008	978-4-08-703193-5
4	April 3, 2009	978-4-08-703201-7
5	April 4, 2011	978-4-08-703243-7
6	October 4, 2012	978-4-08-703277-2
7	September 4, 2013	978-4-08-703299-4
8	June 4, 2018	978-4-08-703451-6
9	December 4, 2024	978-4-08-703551-3
10	October 3, 2025	978-4-08-703563-6

=== Manga ===
A vertical, full-color digital manga adaptation, titled Gintama: 3-Nen Z-Gumi Ginpachi-sensei Touuunn!! (銀魂 3年Z組銀八先生 とぅぅぅんん!!), storyboarded by Ao Suzumemura and illustrated by Yūki Aonuma, started on Shueisha's vertical-scrolling manga service Jump Toon on October 6, 2025. It was added to Shueisha's shōnen manga magazine Jump Square in horizontal format on January 5, 2026, simply titled Gintama: 3-Nen Z-Gumi Ginpachi-sensei (銀魂 3年Z組銀八先生). A single tankōbon volume has been released as of June 2026.

No.	Release date	ISBN
1	June 4, 2026	978-4-08-885129-7
2	December 4, 2026	978-4-08-885282-9

=== Anime ===
An anime adaptation was announced at the Gintama Ato no Matsuri event in March 2023. The series was produced by BN Pictures and directed by Natsumi Higashida, with Makoto Moriwaki serving as chief director, with Kazuyuki Fudeyasu and Mitei Mark II handling series composition, Shinji Takeuchi serving as character designer and chief animation director. Audio Highs composed the music. It aired from October 7 to December 23, 2025, on TV Tokyo and its affiliates. (Note: TV Tokyo listed the series premiere on October 6 at 24:00, which is effectively October 7 at midnight JST.) The opening theme song is "Sakurakaze" (桜風; lit. 'Cherry Blossom Wind'), performed by Botchi Boromaru, while the ending theme song is "Underclass Hero", performed by Longman.

Web3 anime-styled brand Azuki's Anime.com platform partnered with TV Tokyo to stream the series in English in the United States, while Crunchyroll acquired for worldwide streaming. Medialink licensed the series in South and Southeast Asia (outside Australia and New Zealand) for streaming on Ani-One Asia's YouTube channel.

==== Episodes ====
No.	Title	Directed by (Note: Production staff information is taken from the ending credits of each episode.)	Written by	Storyboarded by	Original release date
1	"Cram Schools Teachers Say, You Don't Have to Get a 100, 70's Enough."; Transliteration: "100-Ten Toranakute ī 70-tende ītte Juku no Sensei iu yo ne" (Japanese: 100点とらなくていい70点でいいって塾の先生言うよね)	Natsumi Higashida	Kazuyuki Fudeyasu	Natsumi Higashida	October 7, 2025
2	"People Can Change How They Look But Not Who They Are"; Transliteration: "Mitame ga Kawatte mo Nakami wa Kawaranai no ga Ningen" (Japanese: 見た目が変わっても中身は変わらないのが人間)	Moe Katō	Kazuyuki Fudeyasu	Natsumi Higashida	October 14, 2025
2	"No Matter How Old You Get, Tests Always Suck"; Transliteration: "Tesuto wa Ikutsu ni Natte mo Iyana Mono" (Japanese: テストはいくつになっても嫌なもの)	Moe Katō	Kazuyuki Fudeyasu	Natsumi Higashida	October 14, 2025
2	"When You Ask Someone for Advice, You Usually Know the Solution Yourself Deep Down"; Transliteration: "Hito ni Sōdan Suru Toki tte, Taigai Sōdan Suru Mae ni Jibun no Naka de mō Kotae ga de Teru" (Japanese: 人に相談する時って、たいがい相談する前に自分の中でもう答えが出てる)	Moe Katō	Kazuyuki Fudeyasu	Natsumi Higashida	October 14, 2025
3	"When the Quiet Kid Cracks a Joke, It's Hard to React, but You Can't Ignore It, so All You Can Do Is Laugh"; Transliteration: "Fudan Shaberanai Yatsu ga Totsuzen Bokeru to Riakushon ni Komaruga Komatta Tokoro de Surū Dekinai Ijō Warau Shika nai" (Japanese: 普段喋らない奴が突然ボケるとリアクションに困るが困ったところでスルーできない以上笑うしかない)	Kenta Kushitani	Kento Shimoyama	Natsumi Higashida	October 21, 2025
4	"Horror and Comedy Are Two Sides of the Same Coin"; Transliteration: "Kyōfu to Warai wa Kamihitoe" (Japanese: 恐怖と笑いは紙一重)	Ayaka Tsujihashi	Nozomu Oshima	Natsumi Higashida	October 28, 2025
5	"It's Nice Having a Party Member Who Can Use Safe Passage"; Transliteration: "Toramana Tsukaeru Yakko ga Pātī ni Iru to, Sore wa Sore de Benri" (Japanese: トラマナ使える奴がパーティーにいると、それはそれで便利)	Kōsuke Shimotori	Nozomu Oshima	Hirofumi Ogura	November 4, 2025
6	"Everyone Fantasizes a Little Bit About Transferring Because of Their Dad's Job"; Transliteration: "Otōsan no Shigoto no Tsugō de Tenkō Toka, Chotto dake Akogareru" (Japanese: お父さんの仕事の都合で転校とか、ちょっとだけ憧れる)	Kenta Kushitani	Hiroko Kanasugi	Hirokazu Hisayuki	November 11, 2025
7	"Spent Too Much Time Reading Old Copies of Jump and Didn't Get Much Cleaning Done"; Transliteration: "Mukashi no Janpu o Yomifukette Itasei de Daisōji ga Hakadorimasen deshita" (Japanese: 昔のジャンプを読みふけっていたせいで大掃除がはかどりませんでした)	Morihito Abe	Hiroko Kanasugi	Ayaka Tsujihashi	November 18, 2025
8	"They Say Nobody'll Ever Know if You Embarrass Yourself on a Holiday, but Nobody Wants to Embarrass Themselves in the First Place"; Transliteration: "Tabi no Haji wa Kakisute tte iu Kedo, Narubekunara Haji wa Kakitaku nai Monda" (Japanese: 旅の恥はかき捨てって言うけど、なるべくなら恥はかきたくないもんだ)	Ayaka Tsujihashi	Masaki Tachihara	Makoto Moriwaki	November 25, 2025
9	"You Say School Festivals Suck, but You're Enjoying Yourself, Aren't You?"; Transliteration: "Bunkasai Nante Tsumannee tte Itteru Kuse ni, Hontō wa Omae Tanoshinderu Daro?" (Japanese: 文化祭なんてつまんねぇって言ってるくせに、本当はお前楽しんでるだろ？)	Moe Katō	Masaki Tachihara	Moe Katō	December 2, 2025
10	"Not Everything's Better Short"; Transliteration: "Nan Demo Kan Demo Mijikaku su Rya Ītte Monde mo Nai" (Japanese: なんでもかんでも短くすリャいいってもんでもない)	Moe Katō	Kento Shimoyama	Moe Katō	December 9, 2025
11	"Whoever Shows Up Late On Purpose to Stand Out Deserves a Dropkick"; Transliteration: "Wazato Okurete Kite Medatou to Suru Yakko ni Doroppukikku" (Japanese: わざと遅れて来て目立とうとする奴にドロップキック)	Natsumi Higashida	Kento Shimoyama	Susumu Nishizawa	December 16, 2025
12	"Old Times Talk in Reunions and Last Episode Recaps in Anime Are Just Filler for When You Have Nothing to Show or Talk About"; Transliteration: "Dōsōkai no Mukashibanashi to Anime no Mae-banashi Kaisō wa Kekkyoku Honpen ga Tarinai Toki no Umeawase" (Japanese: 同窓会の昔話とアニメの前話回想は結局本編が足りない時の埋め合わせ)	Ayaka Tsujihashi	Kento Shimoyama	Hirofumi Ogura	December 23, 2025
