= Onegai My Melody =

Anime television series

- Cover of Volume 13 of Onegai My Melody Kirara DVD

おねがいマイメロディ (Onegai Mai Merodi)
- Anime television series
- Directed by: Makoto Moriwaki
- Produced by: Akihiro Sekiyama; Hideyuki Kachi; Hiroyuki Hara; Kazuya Watanabe
- Written by: Kazuki Yamanobe; Takashi Yamada
- Music by: Cher Watanabe
- Studio: Studio Comet
- Original network: TXN (TVO, TV Tokyo)
- English network: PH: Cartoon Network
- Original run: April 3, 2005 – March 26, 2006
- Episodes: 52
- Anime television series

Onegai My Melody: Kuru Kuru Shuffle
- Directed by: Makoto Moriwaki
- Produced by: Akihiro Sekiyama; Hideyuki Kachi; Hiroyuki Hara; Kazuya Watanabe
- Written by: Takashi Yamada
- Music by: Cher Watanabe
- Studio: Studio Comet
- Original network: TV Osaka; TV Tokyo; Kids Station; Animax
- English network: HK: TVB
- Original run: April 2, 2006 – March 23, 2007
- Episodes: 52
- Anime television series

Onegai My Melody Sukkiri♪
- Directed by: Makoto Moriwaki
- Produced by: Akihiro Sekiyama; Hideyuki Kachi; Hiroyuki Hara; Kazuya Watanabe
- Written by: Takashi Yamada
- Music by: Cher Watanabe
- Studio: Studio Comet
- Original network: TV Osaka; TV Tokyo; Kids Station; Animax
- English network: HK: TVB
- Original run: April 1, 2007 – March 24, 2008
- Episodes: 52
- Anime television series

Onegai My Melody Kirara★
- Directed by: Makoto Moriwaki
- Produced by: Kiyoshi Fukumoto
- Written by: Takashi Yamada
- Music by: Cher Watanabe
- Studio: Studio Comet
- Original network: TV Osaka; TV Tokyo; Kids Station; Animax
- English network: HK: TVB
- Original run: April 6, 2008 – March 29, 2009
- Episodes: 52
- Anime film

Onegai My Melody: Yū & Ai
- Directed by: Makoto Moriwaki
- Studio: Studio Comet; Toho
- Released: August 11, 2012
- Light novel

Onegai My Melody High School~
- Written by: Takashi Yamada
- Illustrated by: Tomoko Miyakawa
- Published by: PHP Interface
- Imprint: Smash Bunko
- Published: March 8, 2013
- Related anime
- My Melody & Kuromi

Onegai My Melody (Japanese: おねがいマイメロディ, Hepburn: Onegai mai merodi; lit. Please My Melody) is a Japanese anime series produced by Studio Comet, based on the Sanrio character My Melody. The anime is directed by Makoto Moriwaki (High School! Kimengumi The Movie) and produced by Hideyuki Kachi and Kazuya Watanabe. The series was written by Takashi Yamada (Yumeiro Patissiere) with character designs from Tomoko Miyakawa. It ran on TV Osaka and TV Tokyo from April 3, 2005, to March 26, 2006, spanning 52 episodes.

== Story ==
=== My Melody ===
Kuromi and Baku are imprisoned in a dungeon in Mariland. They make their escape with the Melody Key and the Melody Bow, but in their haste forget the instruction manuals. They flee to the human world, and shortly after arriving, Kuromi discovers the power of the Melody Key, which makes wishes come true using the power of darkness. If the person who wishes enjoys the nightmare, he or she will produce Black Notes, which Baku promptly eats to store them. What neither one of them realize is that when 100 Black Notes are gathered, the Spirit of Dark Power will be revived to destroy the human world and devour all the humans' dreams. Because Mariland is formed from the dreams of humans, even the incompetent king is able to sense danger to his people. He gives the Melody Takt to My Melody and sends her to the human world, with a mission to collect 100 Pink Notes to create the Dream Power to combat the Spirit of Dark Power. Along the way, My Melody meets a human girl named Yumeno Uta, and her world is about to change forever.

=== KuruKuru Shuffle ===
Kuromi and Baku obtained a new Melody Key and the Melody Pick, an item associated with the Spirit of Dark Power. Because of this, the King of Mari Land appointed My Melody once again to capture both fugitives and prevent the Spirit of Dark Power from resurrecting for the second time. In the human world, Uta misses My Melody and wonders what she is doing right now back at Mari Land. But then a new student named Jun Hiiragi arrived from England at Uta's school, and she notices he was Keiichi's little brother. Baku and Kuromi also arrived in the human world and learned that if they collected eight black notes that coincide with the Solfège scale, their wishes will come true and decided to wreak havoc in the city once more. Back at Mari Land, Keiichi Hiiragi is being judged guilty of his crimes against Mari Land, and to make up for it, he must help Uta and My Melody fight the darkness, but will be secretly punished. Uta and My Melody must stop the Revival of the Spirit of Dark Power once again before it is too late.

=== Sukkiri ===
One year after the second defeat of the Spirit of Dark Power, My Melody and her friends returned to Mariland until Baku "dropped a bomb" in the middle of the flower field, taking out black notes all over Mari Land and the human world. After a short while, Mariland had their "high court" and took the king off the throne. When the time came to choose the next ruler, a black note came to the minister, turning him into a "Huff-Huff" which is a residue of Dar-chan. My Melody refreshed him and was chosen to be a candidate for princess. However, she has to pass a trial by turning all of the black notes into Twinkle Gems to put in her crown. As soon as Kuromi heard this, she was outraged as she wanted to become the princess as well, but then a very mysterious woman came with an intriguing offer. Kuromi now has to collect Anger Gems and put them in her crown to become the Dark Princess and rule over Mari Land. The two decide to go to the human world and collect every black note for them to become the next ruler of Mari Land. Unbeknownst to everyone, the spirit again will make its rise as he intends to plunge both Earth and Mariland into eternal darkness.

=== Kirara ===
Set before the events of the Uta Arc, Mariland is celebrating a special event that involves watching the Shooting Star, on which they can grant someone's wish. In the human world, Kirara Hoshizuki, a normal elementary schoolgirl, is watching the stars that night until she is visited by the king of Mari Land, who invites her to his world. As the king takes her to Mari Land, she meets My Melody for the first time and becomes friends with her as they both watch the shooting stars. But in an unexpected predicament, the Wishing Star crashed and broke into pieces. Even worse, the passageway that connects back to earth is damaged as well. During the disaster, My Melody and Kirara met Prince Sorara, the prince of the star, who somewhat transformed into a giant chick after the Wishing Star is broken, and both My Melody and Kirara need to collect all the pieces of the Wishing Star for both Sorara and Kirara to go back to their respective worlds.

=== High school ===
Set three years after the end of Sukkiri, Uta Yumeno, now a sophomore in high school, is living a good life in the human world with her family and friends. She also wonders how My Melody is doing. However, back in Mariland, Kuromi steals a dark item called Dokurobou (skull bow), which contains powerful dark magic that can plunge Mariland into chaos, and again escapes into the human world with the said item. As she reaches the human world, she meets with Uta and Kakeru Kogure once more and starts to cause trouble. Luckily, My Melody comes to the human world as well and now must prevent the dark magic inside the Dokurobou from unleashing into the human world.

== Characters ==
=== Humans ===
- Uta Yumeno (夢野歌, Yumeno Uta) (Voiced by: Azusa Kataoka) is the human protagonist of the series.
- Keiichi Hiiragi (柊恵一, Hiiragi) (Voiced by: Ryōtarō Okiayu) is the human antagonist of the series. He is Kanade's classmate and a famous violinist.
- Jun Hiiragi (柊潤, Hiiragi Jun) (Voiced by: Hayato Isohata) is Keiichi's younger brother who comes home after several years in a Japanese school for boys at London.
- Mana Fujisaki (藤崎真菜, Fujisaki Mana) (Voiced by: Yū Sugimoto) is a tomboyish red-haired girl who has been one of Uta's friends since elementary school. She is athletic and has a fear of cute things.
- Miki Sakurazuka (桜塚美紀, Sakurazuka Miki) (Voiced by: Ami Koshimizu) is Uta's best friend since kindergarten.
- Kakeru Kogure (小暮翔, Kogure Kakeru) (Voiced by: Miyuki Sawashiro) is one of Uta's friends since elementary school.
- Kanade Yumeno (夢野奏, Yumeno Kanade) (Voiced by: Natsuki Katō) is Uta's older sister and Keiichi's classmate.
- Koto Yumeno (夢野琴, Yumeno Koto) (Voiced by: Aoi Yūki) is Uta's younger sister.
- Kirara Hoshizuki (星月きらら, Hoshizuki Kirara) (Voiced by: Reina Tanaka) is the human protagonist of Onegai My Melody Kirara and the first human My Melody meets.

=== Mariland Denizens ===
- My Melody (マイメロディ, Maimerodi) (Voiced by: Rei Sakuma) is the denizen protagonist of the series who is a rabbit from Mariland.
- Flat (フラット, Furatto) (Voiced by: Kaori Miura) is a blue mouse with yellow ears who wears an orange or pink ribbon on his tail.
- Piano (ピアノ) (Voiced by: Junko Takeuchi) is a sheep with pink wool. Behind only to Flat, she is Melody's second-closest animal friend. She does not speak but has talent in playing keyboards.
- King (王様, Ōsama) (Voiced by: Hidenobu Kiuchi) is the elephant Ruler of Mariland, who has a crush on Kanade.
- Prince Sorara (ソララ王子, Sorara ōji) (Voiced by: Kōki Miyata) is the prince of the Star Kingdom.

=== Antagonists ===
- Kuromi (クロミ) (Voiced by: Junko Takeuchi) is the self-proclaimed rival of My Melody.
- Baku (バク) (Voiced by: Noboru Maeda) is a purple tapir and Kuromi's sidekick with the ability to fly. He often seems to have a crush on Kuromi and is often victim to her anger.
- Spirit of Dark Power (Dar-chan) (ダークパワーの精（ダーちゃん）, Dāku Pawā no Sei (Dā-chan)) (Voiced by: Hidenobu Kiuchi): The main antagonist of all four series, a mysterious being that can inhabit those who tamper with the Dark Power or have powerful dreams.

== Sequels ==
Four official sequels were produced and each coincides with their respective story arcs. The first sequel, Onegai My Melody: KuruKuru Shuffle! (おねがいマイメロディ 〜くるくるシャッフル!〜, Onegai Mai Merodi: Kurukuru Shaffuru!; Please My Melody Round-and-Round Shuffle!) aired from April 2, 2006, to March 23, 2007. The second sequel, Onegai My Melody: Sukkiri (おねがいマイメロディ すっきり♪, Onegai Mai Merodi: Sukkiri)lit. 'Please My Melody Clear' ran from April 1, 2007, to March 24, 2008, as a segment on Anime Lobby.

Sukkiri was followed by a third and final sequel, Onegai My Melody Kirara (おねがい♪マイメロディ きららっ★, Onegai Mai Melody Kirara; Please My Melody Sparkle), which ran from April 6, 2008, to March 29, 2009. before being replaced by Jewelpet in its timeslot.

On February 5, 2012, Sanrio announced that a theatrical short named Onegai My Melody: Yū & Ai was in the works and would be released alongside the first Jewelpet film, Jewelpet the Movie: Sweets Dance Princess as a double feature.

A light novel titled Onegai♪My Melody High School~ (おねがい♪マイメロディ はいすく～る, Onegai♪mai merodi Hai sukuru~)lit. 'Please♪My Melody High School~', serves as a continuation of the franchise and was released by PHP Interface under the Smash Bunko label on March 8, 2013.

== Reception ==
Onegai My Melody was positively received among fans of Sanrio's character franchises, and has garnered a cult following. On December 11, 2011, United States–based anime distributor Funimation (now owned by Sony Pictures) set up a forum on its website gauging consumer interest in potential anime acquisitions. One title requested was the first Onegai My Melody series.
