= PriPara Minna no Akogare Let's Go PriPari =

- Poster

Japanese name
- Kanji: プリパラ み～んなのあこがれ♪レッツゴー☆プリパリ
- Directed by: Makoto Moriwaki
- Screenplay by: Kazuyuki Fudeyasu
- Based on: PriPara by Syn Sophia and Takara Tomy
- Production company: Tatsunoko Production
- Distributed by: Avex Pictures
- Release date: March 12, 2016
- Running time: 60 minutes
- Country: Japan
- Language: Japanese
- Box office: ¥44.7 million

PriPara Minna no Akogare Let's Go PriPari (プリパラ み～んなのあこがれ♪レッツゴー☆プリパリ) is a 2016 Japanese animated film directed by Makoto Moriwaki, written by Kazuyuki Fudeyasu and produced by Tatsunoko Production. It is the third film in the film series based on the arcade game and anime television series PriPara. The film was released in Japan by Avex Pictures on March 12, 2016.

== Plot ==
Laala is spending a normal day in Pripara with her friends, when they are all transported to the Pripara Grand Canyon. Meganii and Meganee explain that they received a distress call from Falulu in Pripari, the world headquarters of all Pripara, located in Prance. Falulu warns everyone that ominous black clouds have appeared above the Eppel Tower and that Pripari is beginning to lose its Sparkle power. The message is cut short before Falulu can elaborate further but Meganii explains that if Pripara loses all its Sparkle then they can no longer be idols. Meganii goes on to explain that the idols must travel to Pripari if they hope to save Pripara for everyone. He also explains that on the way they should perform as much as they can in order to collect Sparkle, or likes, from idols all over the world. Meganee reveals vehicles for all the idols, saying that they cannot use any normal transport, such as the Pritrain or Pricopter, as all forms of transport have become unusable since the disturbance in Pripari. Meganee tells the idols that the entrance to Pripari is at the end of the canyon and that they should hurry.

In Pripari, Falulu begins to fall into a coma, Unicorn explains to Gaaruru that because Falulu was born from the Sparkle power, she and the other Mini Falulu will disappear too, if Pripara is not saved. Gaaruru is unaffected as she was born from the negative feelings of girls who struggled to become idols, opposite to Falulu. Laala and her friends start heading through the canyon, but when they reach the entrance to Pripari, they find Aromageddon have beaten them there. Aroma reveals she plans to get to Pripari first, then seal the entrance with an explosive, but Mikan detonates the explosive prematurely, causing everyone to be blasted out of Pripara to various locations around the world.

Laala, Mirei and Sophy end up in Osaka, where they locate the local Pripara in an Aquarium. They perform for the local idols and collect their likes before continuing on to Pripari. Sion, Dorothy and Reona end up in the United States of Pamerica, where they find the Arepa 51 Pripara to perform at, before continuing on and getting lost in the Gobi desert where they meet Hibiki. Unfortunately the Gobi desert has a side effect of causing people to use sentence enders, which Hibiki hates more than anything. Hibiki is forced to perform in order to cause an oasis to appear and save Dressing Pafe from dying of thirst. Afterwards the three idols thank Hibiki, but are surprised when she begins using 'Pri' as a sentence ender, making them laugh. Hibiki angrily storms off out of the desert with Dressing Pafe in pursuit. Aroma and Mikan end up in Pegypt, where Mikan is able to reveal the entrance to Pegypt's Pripara in a Pyramid under a lake where they perform to get likes. Ajimi ends up lost in the Atlantic Ocean but manages to get to the Palps and meet up with Fuwari who has managed to get home to visit her grandfather. The two idols perform a duet for Fuwari's grandfather before continuing on to Pripari. The other idols, which include Sophy's Royal Guard, Laala's friends Nao, Eiko, Love, Ran the ghost girl and Nanami the leader of Pink Actress, all arrive in New York where they end up at the Pripara Fancy Club. Unfortunately the idols learn that the club holds idol deathmatches and that they cannot leave unless they win their match. The idols select Chanko of the Royal Guard to fight as she is the most macho. Chanko reluctantly agrees, winning her match and performing afterwards for likes.

SoLaMi Smile and Dressing Pafe reach Pripari first, and find the city size Pripara covered by black clouds and the Prisian idols acting strangely, saying they hate everything. But Dorothy discovers she can use the power of the likes stored in her Cyalume Charm to change the Prisians back to normal. SoLaMi Smile and Dressing Pafe head to where Falulu is and learn from Gaaruru the reason for the black clouds appearing. It transpires that when Falulu and Gaaruru returned to Pripari they came with Gloria Ookanda, who met her older sister Ploria when they landed on top of the Eppel Tower. At first the sisters excitedly greeted each other but then began arguing over something trivial. It is this argument that formed the clouds and spread the negative aura over Pripari, and the sisters are still fighting, continuing to create the clouds. Gaaruru explains that Falulu may be able to help them reach the two Ookanda sisters, but she has fallen into a coma with the other mini Falulu. Laala and her friends try to use their Cyalume Charms to wake up Falulu but they don't have enough likes. But when all seems hopeless, the other idols appear and use their charms to wake Falulu up. All the idols then perform a live in front of the Eppel Tower, causing the sisters to come to their senses and stop fighting, restoring Pripari and saving Pripara. The Ookanda sisters forgive each other and Laala and her friends return to Japan.

In a post credits scene, Laala is awoken by Non, who tells her a new idol group has appeared in Pripara. Meganii reveals the group to be Junon, Pinon and Kanon of Triangle, before addressing the audience, saying he will look forward to meeting them again in Pripara next time.

== Cast ==
- Himika Akaneya as Laala Manaka
- Yū Serizawa as Mirei Minami
- Miyu Kubota as Sophy Hōjō
- Saki Yamakita as Sion Tōdō
- Azuki Shibuya as Dorothy West
- Yuki Wakai as Reona West
- Yui Makino as Aroma Kurosu
- Yui Watanabe as Mikan Shiratama
- Azusa Sato as Fuwari Midorikaze
- Mitsuki Saiga as Hibiki Shikyoin
- Reina Ueda as Ajimi Kiki
- Chinatsu Akasaki as Falulu and Chanko
- Asami Sanada as Gaaruru
- Urara Takano as Gloria Ōokanda
- Kanae Itō as Meganee Akai
- Junichi Suwabe as Meganii Akai
- Minami Tanaka as Non Manaka/Triangle
- Yoshino Nanjou as Nao
- Aina Kusuda as Sadako
- Sarah Emi Bridcutt as Eiko
- Takuma Terashima as Rei Andō
- Yukiko Morishita as Love Tochiotome
- Yuka Inokuchi as Ran
- Rina Kawaei as Mini-Falulu
- Yoshino Nanjou as Nanami
- Chihiro Suzuki as Kuma
- Takuma Terashima as Usagi
- Hiromi Konno as Neko
- Rikako Aikawa as Toriko
- Ikue Ōtani as Unicorn
- Hirofumi Nojima as Ham

== Production ==
The film was announced in October 2015. The theme song of the film is "Chicken Line", by Japanese idol girl group SKE48.

== Release ==
The release date was announced in November 2015 for March 12, 2016.

== Reception ==
On its opening weekend in Japan, the film was ninth placed, with 37,082 admissions and ¥44.7 million in gross.
