= Kazuyuki Fudeyasu =

Japanese anime screenwriter

- 筆安 一幸
- Occupation: Anime screenwriter
- Writing career
- Years active: 1997–present
- Notable works: Black Clover; That Time I Got Reincarnated as a Slime; By the Grace of the Gods

Japanese name
- Kanji: 筆安 一幸
- Hiragana: ふでやす かずゆき
- Romanization: Fudeyasu Kazuyuki

Kazuyuki Fudeyasu (Japanese: 筆安 一幸, Hepburn: Fudeyasu Kazuyuki) is a Japanese anime screenwriter. He debuted in 1997 and has worked on numerous series since, including Black Clover, That Time I Got Reincarnated as a Slime, and By the Grace of the Gods. Fudeyasu usually spells his name with kanji. However, he will also credit his name in hiragana on some occasions.

== Works ==
=== TV series ===
Year	Title	Credit	Ref
2002	X	Script (eps. 16-19, 22)	
2002	Mirage of Blaze	Series composition	
2007	Princess Resurrection	Series composition	
2008	Kamen no Maid Guy	Series composition	
2009	Hajime no Ippo: New Challenger	Series composition	
2009	Kämpfer	Series composition	
2010	Tantei Opera Milky Holmes	Series composition	
2011	Ben-To	Series composition	
2012	Jewelpet Kira☆Deco!	Series composition	
2012	OniAi	Series composition	
2012	Wooser's Hand-to-Mouth Life	Series composition	
2013	Encouragement of Climb	Series composition	
2013	Muromi-san	Series composition	
2013	Hetalia: Axis Powers	Series composition	
2013	Walkure Romanze	Series composition	
2014	Magical Warfare	Series composition	
2014	Is the Order a Rabbit?	Series composition	
2014	Denkigai no Honya-san	Series composition	
2015	Monster Musume	Series composition	
2015	Yatterman Night	Series composition	
2016	Mahou Shoujo Nante Mouiidesukara	Series composition	
2017	Black Clover	Series composition	
2017	Girls' Last Tour	Series composition	
2017	Recovery of an MMO Junkie	Series composition	
2018	How Not to Summon a Demon Lord	Series composition	
2018	Dropkick on My Devil!	Series composition	
2018	That Time I Got Reincarnated as a Slime	Series composition	
2019	Welcome to Demon School! Iruma-kun	Series composition	
2020	Interspecies Reviewers	Series composition	
2020	Wandering Witch: The Journey of Elaina	Series composition	
2020	By the Grace of the Gods	Series composition	
2021	Bungo Stray Dogs Wan!	Series composition	
2021	Redo of Healer	Series composition	
2022	In the Land of Leadale	Series composition	
2022	Do It Yourself!!	Series composition	
2022	Immoral Guild	Series composition	
2023	Shangri-La Frontier	Series composition	
2024	'Tis Time for "Torture," Princess	Series composition	
2024	A Nobody's Way Up to an Exploration Hero	Series composition	
2025	Medaka Kuroiwa Is Impervious to My Charms	Series composition	
2025	Flower and Asura	Series composition	
2025	I Left My A-Rank Party to Help My Former Students Reach the Dungeon Depths!	Series composition	
2025	Your Forma	Series composition	
2025	A Wild Last Boss Appeared!	Series composition	
2025	The Banished Court Magician Aims to Become the Strongest	Series composition	
2025	Touring After the Apocalypse	Series composition	
2025	Gintama: Mr. Ginpachi's Zany Class	Series composition	
2026	Trigun Stargaze	Series composition	
2026	The Insipid Prince's Furtive Grab for the Throne	Series composition	
2027	Welcome to Demon School! Iruma-kun: IruMafia Edition	Series composition	
2027	The Demons Are Planning Something Good!	Series composition	
TBA	Gokigenyō, Ikkyoku Ika ga?	Series composition	

=== Films ===
Year	Title	Credit	Ref
2008	Hells	Screenplay	
2016	Tantei Opera Milky Holmes the Movie: Milky Holmes' Counterattack	Screenplay	
2016	PriPara Minna no Akogare Let's Go PriPari	Screenplay	
2017	PriPara: Mi~nna de Kagayake! Kirarin Star Live	Screenplay	
2020	Wave!!: Let's Go Surfing!!	Screenplay	
2021	Pretty Guardian Sailor Moon Eternal The Movie	Screenplay	
2022	That Time I Got Reincarnated as a Slime the Movie: Scarlet Bond	Screenplay	
2023	Pretty Guardian Sailor Moon Cosmos The Movie	Screenplay	

=== Web series ===
Year	Title	Credit	Ref
2021	Record of Ragnarok	Series composition	
