= Alloces =

Demon in grimoire books

Seal of Alloces (Ars Goetia)

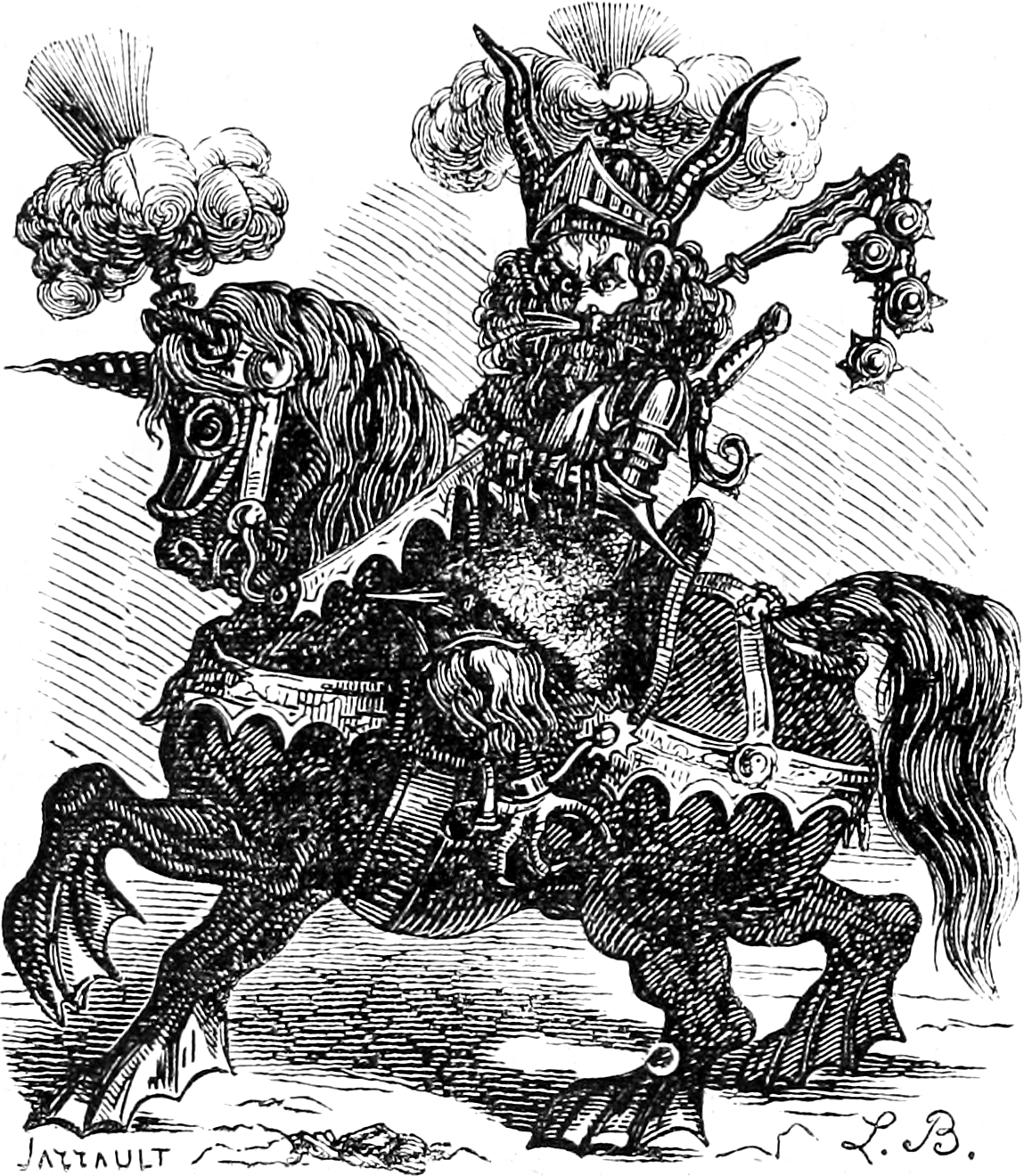
Alloces

Alloces is a demon that appears in demonological grimoires such as the Liber Officiorum Spirituum, Pseudomonarchia Daemonum, and the Lesser Key of Solomon. He is described in the Lesser Key of Solomon (as the fifty-second spirit) and (as Allocer or Alocer) in the Pseudomonarchia Daemonum (as the sixty-third spirit) as a duke, taking the form of a fire-breathing, lion-headed soldier riding a horse. His purported duties include teaching astronomy, and liberal sciences, and granting familiars. He is claimed to have 36 legions of demons under his command. In the Liber Officiorum Spirituum, Alloces appears as Allogor or Algor, (Note: In Sloane MS 3853, a variant of the Office of spirits) again a duke, but otherwise with a completely different appearance and abilities -- a spear-toting knight who answers questions, provides advice for plans, and commands only 30 legions of demons. In the duplicate entry, Alloces appears as Algor, ruled by the spirit "Orience" (Oriens), again as a knight who explains secrets, but with the additional power of garnering the favor of nobles. According to Rudd, Alloces is opposed by the Shemhamphorasch angel Imamiah.

== In popular culture ==
Alloces is portrayed in the Japanese anime and manga series Welcome to Demon School! Iruma-kun as a lion-headed boy named Allocer Schneider.

Alloces in the video game Romancing SaGa 3 is one of the Four Sinistrals who rule the Abyss, with him being the lord of Earth.
