= Gintama =

Japanese manga series by Hideaki Sorachi

- First tankōbon volume cover, featuring Gintoki Sakata

銀魂
- Genre: Adventure; Samurai; Science fiction comedy
- Manga
- Written by: Hideaki Sorachi
- Published by: Shueisha
- English publisher: NA: Viz Media
- Imprint: Jump Comics
- Magazine: Weekly Shōnen Jump; (December 8, 2003 – September 15, 2018); Jump Giga; (December 28, 2018 – February 22, 2019); Gintama app; (May 13 – June 20, 2019)
- English magazine: NA: Shonen Jump
- Original run: December 8, 2003 – June 20, 2019
- Volumes: 77
- Anime television series
- Gintama (2006–2018)
- Anime films
- Gintama: The Movie (2010); Gintama: The Movie: The Final Chapter: Be Forever Yorozuya (2013); Gintama: The Very Final (2021); Gintama: The Movie 2026: Yoshiwara in Flames (2026)
- Live action film
- Gintama (2017); Gintama 2 (2018)
- Related
- Gintama: Mr. Ginpachi's Zany Class
- icon

Gintama (銀魂; lit. 'Silver Soul') is a Japanese manga series written and illustrated by Hideaki Sorachi. It was serialized in Shueisha's shōnen manga magazine Weekly Shōnen Jump from December 2003 to September 2018, later in Jump Giga from December 2018 to February 2019, and concluded on the Gintama app, where it ran from May to June 2019. Its chapters were collected in 77 tankōbon volumes. Set in Japan during the Edo period, which has been conquered by aliens named Amanto, the plot follows Gintoki Sakata, a samurai who works as a freelancer in his self-established store, "Yorozuya", alongside his friends Shinpachi Shimura and Kagura, offering a wide range of services to handle various tasks and odd jobs. After his editor suggested doing a historical series, Sorachi incorporated a science fiction setting to develop characters to his liking.

An original video animation (OVA) adaptation produced by Sunrise was featured at the Jump Festa 2006 Anime Tour in 2005. This was followed by a full 367-episode anime television series adaptation, which aired on TV Tokyo from April 2006 to October 2018. The storyline of the anime series was concluded in the film Gintama: The Very Final, released in January 2021. Two other films, Gintama: The Movie and Gintama: The Movie: The Final Chapter: Be Forever Yorozuya, were released in April 2010 and July 2013, respectively. Besides the anime series, there have been various light novels and video games based on Gintama. A live-action film adaptation was released in July 2017 in Japan by Warner Bros. Pictures. A sequel live-action film premiered in August 2018.

The manga was licensed for English release in North America by Viz Media. In addition to publishing the individual volumes of the series, Viz Media serialized its first chapters in its Shonen Jump manga anthology from the January to the May 2007 issues. Viz Media ceased the English-language localization in 2011, with 23 volumes released.

In Japan, the Gintama manga has been popular, with over 73 million copies in circulation by November 2024, making it one of the best-selling manga series of all time. Gintama has been well-received by critics and audiences alike, with praise for its comedy and characters, as well as its overarching plot and action choreography.

== Plot ==
The story is set in an alternate-history late-Edo period, where humanity is attacked by aliens called "Amanto" (天人; 'Sky People'). Edo Japan's samurai fight to defend Earth, but the shogun cowardly surrenders when he realizes the aliens' power. He agrees to an unequal contract with the aliens, ceding power to them, and also places a ban on carrying swords in public and allows the invaders to enter the country. The samurai's swords are confiscated and the Tokugawa bakufu (shogunate) becomes a puppet government.

The series focuses on an eccentric samurai, Gintoki Sakata who works as an odd-jobs freelancer. He helps a teenager named Shinpachi Shimura save his sister Tae from an Amanto group that wants to send her to a brothel. Impressed by Gintoki, Shinpachi becomes his freelance apprentice to pay the bills and learn more about the enigmatic samurai. When the pair rescues a teenage alien girl with super-strength, Kagura, from a yakuza group, they accept her into their odd-jobs freelancing business, and the three become known as "Yorozuya" (万事屋; 'Store of 10,000 business' or 'We do everything').

While working, they regularly encounter the Shinsengumi police force, who often ally with Gintoki when work involves dangerous criminals. The trio also meets Gintoki's former comrades from the Amanto invasion, including the revolutionary Kotaro Katsura who is friendly toward them despite his terrorist activities against the alien-controlled government.

The story is a balance between episodic and shorter arc based plotlines that resolve quickly, and a rich background plot that develops from its beginning to end. For example, Gintoki's former comrade Shinsuke Takasugi is a major antagonist who regards Gintoki and his other former comrades as enemies and seeks to destroy the shogunate. Over time, Takasugi gains allies, including Kagura's brother Kamui, and the elite fighting unit Mimawarigumi to prepare for his large-scale coup d'état. After the true antagonist—the immortal Utsuro—is introduced, Gintoki works with both friends and enemies to stop Utsuro from destroying the Earth.

== Production ==
Cover of the first issue of the Weekly Shōnen Jump magazine that featured the manga

In 2003, manga artist Hideaki Sorachi, having previously published two one-shots in Weekly Shōnen Jump, was preparing his first serialized work. An editor suggested he create a series based on the Shinsengumi, inspired by an upcoming television drama about the historical group. Although Sorachi admired the Shinsengumi, his initial attempts to develop this concept were unsuccessful. He subsequently shifted to creating an original story set in a fictionalized version of the historical Bakumatsu period, incorporating science fiction elements.

The series was initially titled Yorozuya Gin-san (万事屋銀さん; lit. 'Odd Jobs Gin-san'), but Sorachi found it unimpactful. After discussions with his family, he settled on the title Gintama. The setting was influenced by Sorachi's earlier one-shot "Samuraider," which, despite his own negative assessment, introduced alien characters that were carried into Gintama. Sorachi selected the Bakumatsu and Sengoku periods for their thematic focus on societal change and human nature. By setting the series in an alternate-history Bakumatsu, he aimed to highlight the declining status of samurai and explore their bushido code. The manga Rurouni Kenshin was also a significant inspiration.

The protagonist was originally intended to be Toshiro Hijikata, a character inspired by the historical figure Hijikata Toshizō, whom Sorachi admired. However, after being unable to refine Hijikata's design, Sorachi relegated him to a supporting role and introduced the Shinsengumi as a group within the story. A pilot chapter featured a different plot, including more Shinsengumi members such as one based on Harada Sanosuke, but these older characters were removed for not being entertaining. Sorachi stated that most characters are loosely based on real Edo citizens, with the protagonist Gintoki drawing partial inspiration from Sakata no Kintoki.

The manga initially struggled in popularity and faced potential cancellation. Although the first tankōbon volume sold out, Sorachi later learned the print run had been intentionally small due to publisher Shueisha's concerns. To boost readership, he introduced the Shinsengumi characters, which his assistants found memorable. Sorachi had low expectations for the series' longevity, and after the release of a third volume, he struggled to generate new material. Early popularity was partly attributed to the contemporaneous Shinsengumi drama. Initially hesitant to reference the show, Sorachi later incorporated longer, more dramatic storylines while maintaining the series' humor and satire of modern Japan.

Sorachi's workflow involved developing ideas through solitude or walks, though he occasionally missed revision deadlines before his editor collected the manuscript. He described his ideas as seemingly random but thematically connected, and he frequently relied on his editor for assistance. He approached each chapter as either comedy or drama, defining the overall series as a "science fiction human drama pseudo-historical comedy."

For illustration, Sorachi typically used a felt-tip pen, fountain pen, brush-tip pen, and multiliner. For major characters, he used a felt-tip pen and fountain pen, outlining them with a multiliner-0.8.

== Themes and style ==
Hideaki Sorachi's primary focus in Gintama was the use of gags, though he began incorporating more dramatic storylines during the manga's second year while retaining its comedic foundation. The series frequently employs meta-humor, including fourth-wall breaks and commentary on other manga series. In the first chapter, after a brief fight scene, a character complains it lasted only "one page," to which the protagonist Gintoki replies, "Shut up! One page is a long time for a manga artist!" Gintoki's exaggerated obsession with obtaining the Weekly Shōnen Jump magazine, which leads to conflicts parodying typical shōnen tropes, further satirizes the genre. Other comedic elements rely on knowledge of Japanese culture for full comprehension.

Publications have described the humor as "bizarre" and "weird," often categorizing it into "sci-fi comedy" involving the alien Amanto species and "samurai comedy" derived from the historical setting. The satire frequently targets modern social conventions, celebratory days, and mythical figures. Several characters are also based on or reference historical individuals.

Beyond comedy, the narrative explores social issues arising from the Amanto invasion, most notably the lack of social equality between humans and aliens. This establishes a central theme of characters striving to preserve their way of life, contrasting with the more common shōnen trope of pursuing ambitious dreams.

== Media ==
=== Manga ===
Written and illustrated by Hideaki Sorachi, Gintama debuted in Shueisha's shōnen manga magazine Weekly Shōnen Jump on December 8, 2003. The manga was originally scheduled to end on September 15, 2018; however, on that day, it was announced that the series would be transferred to Jump Giga, where it ran in three consecutive issues from December 28, 2018, to February 22, 2019, and later continued in the free Gintama app, where it ran from May 13 to June 20 of that same year, concluding with its 704th chapter. Shueisha collected its chapters in 77 tankōbon volumes, released from April 2, 2004, to August 2, 2019.

Viz Media licensed Gintama for publication in North America. A 55-page preview from the series was first featured in the January 2006 issue of its Shonen Jump magazine. The chapters were serialized in Shonen Jump from the January to the May 2007 issues, at a rate of one chapter per month. Viz Media published the first 23 volumes under its "Shonen Jump Advanced" imprint from July 3, 2007, to August 2, 2011; the publisher ceased the series' publication without providing further details.

=== Anime ===
==== Jump Festa specials ====
Two animated specials of Gintama were developed by Sunrise for the Jump Festa Anime Tour 2005 and 2008. The first one, having the same title, is composed of various auto conclusive stories meant to introduce the characters from the series. The second special titled Shiroyasha Kotan (白夜叉降誕; lit. 'White Demon's Birth') is initially set in the war between aliens and samurai and is later revealed to be a hoax. On September 30, 2009, a DVD collection, Gintama Jump Anime Tour 2008 & 2005, was published by Aniplex. It contains the 2005 and 2008 specials and an audio commentary. In July 2014, it was announced that the Gintama anime would return for a one-episode special for the year's Jump Festa. The anime special DVD was bundled with the limited edition of the 58th manga volume released on April 3, 2015. The fourth special was also released in 2015.

==== Television series ====
===== 2006–2010 series =====
An anime television series adaptation, also produced by Sunrise, aired for 201 episodes on TV Tokyo from April 4, 2006, to March 25, 2010.

===== Gintama' =====
Gintama' (銀魂'), the sequel to the 2006–2010 series, aired for 51 episodes (episodes 202–252 of the overall series) on TV Tokyo from April 4, 2011, to March 26, 2012.

A second part, subtitled Enchōsen (延長戦), aired for 13 episodes (episodes 253–265 of the overall series) from October 4, 2012, to March 28, 2013.

===== Gintama° =====
A third series, titled Gintama° (銀魂°), aired for 51 episodes (episodes 266–316 of the overall series) on TV Tokyo and its affiliates from April 8, 2015, to March 30, 2016.

===== Gintama. =====
A fourth series, Gintama. (銀魂.), aired for 12 episodes (episodes 317–328 of the overall series) on TV Tokyo and its affiliates from January 9 to March 27, 2017. (Note: TV Tokyo listed its air dates on Sunday at 25:35, which is effectively Monday at 1:35 JST.)

A second part, adapting the skipped comedic arcs taking place before the events of the Shogun Assassination Arc, subtitled Porori-hen (ポロリ篇; 'Slip Arc'), aired for 13 episodes (episodes 329–341 of the overall series) from October 2 to December 25, 2017. (Note: TV Tokyo listed its air dates on Sunday at 25:35, which is effectively Monday at 1:35 JST.)

The third and final part, subtitled Shirogane no Tamashii-hen (銀ノ魂篇; 'Silver Soul Arc'), aired its first 12 episodes (episodes 342–353 of the overall series) from January 8 to March 26, 2018. (Note: TV Tokyo listed its air dates on Sunday at 25:35, which is effectively Monday at 1:35 JST.) Its final 14 episodes (episodes 354–367 of the overall series) aired from July 9 to October 8, 2018. (Note: TV Tokyo listed its air dates on Sunday at 25:35, which is effectively Monday at 1:35 JST.)

==== Gintama: Mr. Ginpachi's Zany Class ====
An anime adaptation of the Gintama: Mr. Ginpachi's Zany Class spin-off light novel aired on TV Tokyo from October 7 to December 23, 2025. (Note: TV Tokyo listed the series premiere on October 6 at 24:00, which is effectively October 7 at midnight JST.)

==== Films ====
Gintama: The Movie, known in Japan as Gintama: Shinyaku Benizakura-Hen (銀魂 新訳紅桜篇; lit. 'Gintama: A New Retelling Benizakura Arc'), a retelling of the Benizakura arc of the manga, premiered in Japan on April 4, 2010.

A second film Gintama: The Movie: The Final Chapter: Be Forever Yorozuya (劇場版 銀魂 完結篇 万事屋よ永遠なれ, Gekijōban Gintama Kanketsu-hen: Yorozuya yo Eien Nare), with a script written by Sorachi, premiered in Japan on July 6, 2013.

A third film, Gintama: The Very Final, known in Japan as Gintama: The Final (銀魂 THE FINAL), premiered on January 8, 2021. It adapts the finale of the original manga, combined with new story elements. It was preceded by an anime special Gintama: The Semi-Final (銀魂 THE SEMI-FINAL), tied into the film, which premiered on January 15, 2021, on the dTV online service, with the second episode released on January 20.

A fourth film, Gintama: The Movie 2026: Yoshiwara in Flames (新劇場版 銀魂 -吉原大炎上-, Shin Gekijō-ban Gintama Yoshiwara dai Enjō), reanimating the Yoshiwara in Flames story arc (episodes 139–146), premiered on February 13, 2026. It premiered on Netflix on August 27, 2026.

===== Compilation films =====
Three compilation films, featuring scenes not included during the television broadcast, were released in 2023 and 2024 as part of the "Gintama 20th Anniversary Project", with a limited three-week screening in Japan. The first film, titled Gintama on Theater 2D: Baragaki-hen (銀魂オンシアター2D バラガキ篇, Gintama on Shiatā 2D Baragaki-hen; lit. 'Gintama on Theater 2D: Thorny Arc'), premiered on November 10, 2023. It encompasses episodes 244–247 of the anime series (Gintama'). The second film, Gintama on Theater 2D: Ikkoku Keisei-hen (銀魂オンシアター2D 一国傾城篇, Gintama on Shiatā 2D Ikkoku Keisei-hen; lit. 'Gintama on Theater 2D: Courtesan of the Nation Arc'), premiered on June 21, 2024. It encompasses episodes 257–261 of the anime series (Gintama': Enchōsen). The third film, Gintama on Theater 2D: Kintama-hen (銀魂オンシアター2D 金魂篇, Gintama on Shiatā 2D Kintama-hen; lit. 'Gintama on Theater 2D: Kintama Arc'), premiered on November 22, 2024. It encompasses episodes 253–256 of the anime series (Gintama': Enchōsen).

==== Original animation DVDs ====
The 65th and 66th volumes of the manga were bundled with an original animation DVD (OAD) each; the volumes were released on August 4 and November 4, 2016, respectively. Both OADs adapt the Love Potion arc of the manga.

=== Live-action ===
In June 2016, Shueisha announced the series would receive a live-action adaptation. Gintama premiered on July 14, 2017, in Japan. The film was written by Yūichi Fukuda and stars Shun Oguri as Gintoki Sakata, along with Kanna Hashimoto as Kagura and Masaki Suda as Shinpachi Shimura. It is a retelling of the franchise's successful Benizakura arc in which Kotaro Katsura is attacked by a member of the army Kiheitai, and Odd Jobs Gin starts searching for him.

A sequel to the live-action film was announced in November 2017 by Fukuda and Shun Oguri and was slated to release in Q3 2018. In April 2018, it was announced that Oguri, Hashimoto and Suda would reprise their roles as Gintoki, Kagura, and Shinpachi respectively. Titled Gintama 2: Rules Are Made to Be Broken (銀魂2 掟は破るためにこそある, Gintama 2: Okite wa Yaburu tame ni koso Aru), the film premiered on August 17, 2018, grossing ¥280 million on its first day and selling one million tickets in seven days.

Along with the release of the film, a 3-episode miniseries titled Gintama 2 – Yonimo Kimyou na Gintama-chan (銀魂2 –世にも奇妙な銀魂ちゃん-; "Gintama 2: The Strange and Unusual Gintama") also premiered on dTV. The 3 episodes would premiere one per week, starting on August 18. They are titled "I Can't Sleep", "Hijikata Smoking Ban", and "No Matter How Old You Are You Hate Going to the Dentist". In seven days after its premiere, the first episode surpassed 4 million views.

=== CDs ===
The music for the Gintama anime is composed by Audio Highs. On September 27, 2006, Audio Highs published the first CD soundtrack for the series known as Gintama Original Soundtrack. It featured 36 tracks including the TV version from the first opening theme and the first two ending themes. The second CD soundtrack, Gintama Original Soundtrack 2, was released on November 11, 2007. It included 40 tracks but it did not have TV versions of the opening and ending themes from the series. The next CD is Gintama Original Soundtrack 3 published on June 24, 2009. It features a total of 28 tracks including the theme "Dondake! Gintaman" (どんだけー! ギンタマン) which was used as a gag in episode 100 from the series. The fourth and latest CD soundtrack is composed of thirty-four tracks and was released on March 21, 2013.

Apart from soundtracks from the TV series, there have been three CDs known as Gintama Best (銀魂 BEST) which include the full versions from the opening and ending themes. Each of the CDs also has an extra DVD with the original videos. The two movies have also had their original CD soundtracks.

=== Light novels ===
A series of light novels, titled 3-Nen Z-Gumi Ginpachi-sensei (3年Z組銀八先生; lit. 'Class 3-Z's Teacher Ginpachi'), written by Tomohito Ōsaki and illustrated by Hideaki Sorachi, has been published by Shueisha. They feature the series characters transposed to a school setting with Gintoki acting as their teacher. The first novel was published on February 3, 2006. The tenth novel was released on October 3, 2025.

A novelization of the second film has also been authored by Ōsaki and was released on July 8, 2013.

=== Video games ===
In Japan, a PlayStation 2 game, Gintama: Together with Gin! My Kabuki District Journal (銀魂 銀さんと一緒!ボクのかぶき町日記, Gintama Gin-san to Issho! Boku no Kabuki-chō Nikki), was released on August 30, 2007, and a Wii game, Gintama: General Store Tube: Tsukkomi-able Cartoon (銀魂 万事屋ちゅ〜ぶ ツッコマブル動画, Gintama Yorozuya Chūbu Tsukkomaburu Dōga), was released on October 25, 2007. Three video games for the Nintendo DS were released: Gintama Dee-Ess: Odd Jobs Grand Riot! (銀魂でぃ〜えす・万事屋大騒動!, Gintama Dīesu Yorozuya Daisōdō!) (September 21, 2006); Gintama: Gintoki vs. Hijikata!? The Huge Fight Over Silver Souls in the Kabuki District!! (銀魂 銀時vs土方!? かぶき町銀玉大争奪戦!!, Gintama Gintoki vs Hijikata!? Kabuki-cho Gitama Daisōdatsusen!!) (December 14, 2006); and Gintama: Silver Ball Quest: Gin's Job-Change to Save the World (銀魂 銀玉くえすと 銀さんが転職したり世界を救ったり, Gintama Gintama Kuesuto Gin-san ga Tenshoku-shitari Sekai o Sukuttari) (December 6, 2007).

Gintama Board Game (銀魂のすごろく, Gintama no Sugoroku) was released on January 24, 2013, for the PlayStation Portable by Namco Bandai Games. Bandai Namco Entertainment released Gintama Rumble (銀魂乱舞, Gintama Ranbu), a hack and slash action game, for the PlayStation 4 and the PlayStation Vita on January 18, 2018.

A smartphone game by Bandai Namco Entertainment, Gintama Kabuki District Great Action Movie (銀魂 かぶき町大活劇, Gintama Kabukichō Daikatsugeki), was released for iOS and Android devices on September 15, 2016; the game ended service on January 10, 2019. A second smartphone game by Sega and NextNinja was announced in November 2025.

Gintama characters also appear in the Weekly Shōnen Jump crossover Jump Super Stars and its sequel, Jump Ultimate Stars, both for Nintendo DS. Gintoki also appears as a playable fighter in the Jump crossover fighting game J-Stars Victory VS on PlayStation 3 and PlayStation Vita, with Kagura and Sadaharu acting as support. A collaboration with The King of Fighters All Star, a mobile beat 'em up spin-off to The King of Fighters, ran in October 2018. A second collaboration ran from July to August 2020.

=== Guidebooks ===
There have been various guidebooks for the Gintama manga and its anime. The first guidebook for the manga is Gintama Official Character Book – Gin Channel! (銀魂公式キャラクターブック｢銀ちゃんねる!｣, Gintama Official Character Book – Gin Chaneru!) released by Shueisha on April 4, 2006. It features characters files, an interview with Hideaki Sorachi, and original character stickers. The second book is Gintama Official Character Book 2 – Fifth Grade (銀魂公式キャラクターブック2 ｢銀魂五年生｣, Gintama Official Character Book 2 – Gonen-Sei) which was published on May 5, 2009. Like the previous book, this one also has an interview with Sorachi and files for the new characters that have appeared in the series since the first guidebook's release. The first guidebook for the anime is named Gintama Official Animation Guide "Gayagaya Box" (オフィシャルアニメーションガイド 銀魂あにめガヤガヤ箱). It was published on April 4, 2008, to celebrate the airing of the anime's 100th episode. This guidebook features commentaries by the Japanese voice actors and the cast from the series. It was followed by Official Animation Guide Gintama Anime Paraparakan (オフィシャルアニメーションガイド 銀魂あにめパラパラ館) on April 5, 2011. A series of three anime character guidebooks titled Gintama Character Book (銀魂キャラクターズブック, Gintama Kyarakutazu Bukku) have also been published in Japan within 2010.

== Reception ==
=== Sales and accolades ===
The Gintama manga had 50 million copies in circulation by May 2016; over 55 million by February 2018; over 58 million by December 2023; and over 73 million by November 2024. By March 2007, the first volume had surpassed one million copies. Following volumes from the manga have also had strong sales, appearing various times in Japanese manga rankings. The 17th volume ranked as the tenth best-selling volume of Japan during 2007. In 2008, the manga ranked as the tenth best-selling series, with over 2.3 million copies sold. It was also the fifth best-selling manga in the first half of 2009 list, selling over 2.7 million volumes from November 17, 2008, to May 17, 2009. The first Gintama light novel became the top-selling novel in Japan in 2006. The same achievement was reached by the third novel during 2008. English sales of the manga volumes were strong, with some of them having appeared in Diamond Comic Distributors's Top 300 Graphic Novels.

In the 2006 Manga Top 10 list by Zassosha's Puff Japanese manga magazine, Gintama ranked second in the Long-form Award category. Fuji News Network attributed the popularity of wooden swords in 2008 to Gintama, noting that Hokkaido retailers experienced significant sales to foreigners. In a 2009 survey conducted by Oricon, Gintama was listed as the sixth choice for what manga should be adapted into a live-action film. In a 2017 poll conducted by Japanese website Goo, Gintama was voted the funniest manga of all time. On TV Asahi's Manga Sōsenkyo 2021 poll, in which 150,000 people voted for their top 100 manga series, Gintama ranked twelfth.

At the 2008 Society for the Promotion of Japanese Animation Awards, Gintama was nominated in the "Best Manga – Comedy" category, where it lost to Negima! Magister Negi Magi.

=== Critical response ===
Critical response to Gintama has generally been positive. Carlo Santos from Anime News Network found it to be a "one-of-a-kind comedy", praising the characters' personalities and gags. On the other hand, he criticized the artwork for being "hard to follow" during fast scenes. Jokes regarding clichés from other shōnen series were also positively received by About.com writer Deb Aoki, who, like Santos, found the artwork to be "the only thing that distracts from the otherwise considerable pleasures of this loveable, goofy manga". However, the characters' designs were commended for their diversity, particularly those created by Katherine Dacey from Pop Culture Shock, who noted that "[t]hese characters add visual interest and life to every panel, keeping the reader invested when the stories stall." Negative comments were made about the small number of aliens appearing in the series, as well as how some chapters were focused entirely on fights, such as Hijikata's fight against Gintoki. Michael Aronson from Manga Life concluded his review of the manga by saying that "The potential is there, but the execution is struggling" as still, he liked the comedy from the story.

Comics Village's Alex Hoffman stated that Gintama "can't truly be compared to those comics because of one thing: the jokes." He found the context from the series hilarious and liked how there were new jokes in every chapter. Like other reviewers, Hoffman also disliked Sorachi's artwork, but still found the manga to be "a great comedy, or a great read." Comic Book Bin writer Leroy Douresseaux found that the large number of characters with different appearances in the series allowed the reader to remain entertained with the series, as "at least every few pages or so present some unusual and interesting visual." Anime News Network criticized its large amount of penis jokes, as well as the narrative's style, which might bother readers. The series was also criticized for employing the very Shōnen Jump tropes it was intended to satirize.
