= Welcome to Demon School! Iruma-kun =

Japanese manga series by Osamu Nishi

- Cover of the first manga volume, featuring Iruma Suzuki

魔入りました! 入間くん (Mairimashita! Iruma-kun)
- Genre: Fantasy comedy
- Manga
- Written by: Osamu Nishi
- Published by: Akita Shoten
- English publisher: NA: Kodansha USA
- Imprint: Shōnen Champion Comics
- Magazine: Weekly Shōnen Champion
- Original run: March 2, 2017 – present
- Volumes: 51
- Anime television series
- Directed by: Makoto Moriwaki (Note: Credited as Chief Director (総監督, Sō Kantoku) for the fourth season); Ayaka Tsujihashi (S4)
- Produced by: Yūsuke Fujita
- Written by: Kazuyuki Fudeyasu
- Music by: Akimitsu Honma
- Studio: BN Pictures
- Licensed by: Crunchyroll (Note: Streaming rights (S1–) and home video rights (S2–) outside of Asia.); NA: Sentai Filmworks (HV S1); UK: Anime Limited (HV S1); SA/SEA: Muse Communication
- Original network: NHK Educational TV
- English network: US: Crunchyroll Channel
- Original run: October 5, 2019 – September 27, 2026
- Episodes: 89
- Manga

Makai no Shuyaku wa Wareware da!
- Written by: Koneshima
- Illustrated by: Atsushi Tsudanuma
- Published by: Akita Shoten
- Imprint: Shōnen Champion Comics
- Magazine: Weekly Shōnen Champion
- Original run: January 9, 2020 – October 16, 2024
- Volumes: 22
- Manga

Devilish Tales: Kalego's Story
- Written by: Osamu Nishi
- Published by: Akita Shoten
- English publisher: NA: Kodansha USA
- Imprint: Shōnen Champion Comics
- Magazine: Weekly Shōnen Champion
- Original run: December 7, 2023 – January 18, 2024
- Volumes: 1
- Manga

Boku Dōmei no Game-dō
- Written by: Konisuke
- Published by: Akita Shoten
- Magazine: Champion Buzz
- Original run: March 5, 2026 – present
- Anime film
- Spin-off
- Welcome to Demon School! Iruma-kun: IruMafia Edition (anime and manga)
- icon

Welcome to Demon School! Iruma-kun (Japanese: 魔入りました! 入間くん, Hepburn: Mairimashita! Iruma-kun; "Enrolled Demon Iruma!"), also known as MaIruma (魔入間) or Iruma-kun (入間くん) for short, is a Japanese manga series by Osamu Nishi about a teenager who is sold by his parents to a demon who adopts him as his grandson and enrolls him in a school for demons. It has been serialized in Akita Shoten's shōnen manga magazine Weekly Shōnen Champion since March 2017, with its chapters collected in 51 tankōbon volumes as of October 2026.

An anime television series adaptation, produced by BN Pictures, aired on NHK Educational TV between October 2019 and March 2020, followed by a second season aired from April to September 2021, and a third season aired from October 2022 to March 2023. A fourth season aired from April to September 2026. A new anime film has been announced.

By March 2026, the manga and its spin-offs had over 20 million copies in circulation.

== Plot ==
The story follows Iruma Suzuki, a 14-year-old human boy who is sold to a demon by his lazy, selfish and neglectful parents. The demon, known as Sullivan, takes Iruma to the Demon World and officially adopts him as his grandson. He enrolls Iruma in the Babyls School for Demons where he is the headmaster and where Iruma quickly befriends the demons Alice Asmodeus and Clara Valac. However, Sullivan tells Iruma to never reveal that he is human since he will be eaten if anyone finds out.

== Characters ==
=== Main characters ===
Iruma Suzuki (鈴木入間, Suzuki Iruma)
Voiced by: Ayumu Murase (Japanese); Laura Stahl (English)
Iruma is a 14-year-old human boy who was sold by his parents to the Demon Lord Sullivan, who adopts him as his grandson. Iruma's parents neglected him (in ridiculously extreme ways), so he was unable to attend normal school regularly in the human world. From a young age, he experienced a variety of situations and had many jobs in order to support himself. These odd experiences helped him develop great adaptability, survival skills and agility.
Iruma is also very kind which makes him gullible to requests as he genuinely helps people even at his own inconvenience. He attends the demon school by concealing his true identity as a human. Despite his earnest efforts to keep a low profile, he frequently stands out among his peers partly because of misunderstandings and also from Sullivan's eccentricity. Iruma later learns to come to terms with his popularity; he becomes friends with Alice and Clara and they soon form an unlikely trio. He is highly admired by his fellow classmates and acquaintances, initially due to the misunderstandings surrounding him, but later due to his own merits and his never-give-up attitude.
During the Demon Rank placement exams, his rank was immeasurable because the ranking owl gave him the Ring of Gluttony from a Demonic Prophecy instead of a rank badge, so he was placed in the lowest rank: Aleph (Rank 1). Also, Iruma accidentally made his homeroom teacher, Kalego, his familiar. After some initial deliberation, Iruma resolves to work hard to get promoted in rank and to make his new family proud and become strong enough to protect those he really cares for. He is now currently ranked 5.5, between ranks He (Rank 5) and Vau (Rank 6), the second highest among the students of Babyls, due to irregularites in his most recent rank exam.
Alice Asmodeus (アスモデウス・アリス, Asumodeusu Arisu)
Voiced by: Ryōhei Kimura (Japanese); Billy Kametz (seasons 1-2), Stephen Fu (season 3) (English)
Iruma's best friend and loyal companion after he lost a battle to Iruma (who dodged all of his attacks) on his first day at Babyls. Primarily referred to by his family name, or "Azu" for short. His rank and power exceed those of most freshmen, and he has the ability to wield fire. He was the valedictorian of the freshman class, with the highest grades on the entrance exam. He was placed in the Misfit Class due to his duel with Iruma causing a massive ruckus in the entire school. At first, he begrudgingly played with Clara upon Iruma's request, but later also becomes her best friend. He is generally very calm, but when Iruma is involved, he becomes more emotional, even fighting with Clara so he can get Iruma's attention. His familiar is a white Gorgon snake who also wields fire. He is now currently ranked as He (Rank 5).
Both his original name and his localized name make reference to the demoniac figure known as Asmodeus.
Ameri Azazel (アザゼル・アメリ, Azazeru Ameri)
Voiced by: Saori Hayami (Japanese); Kira Buckland (English)
A fox-eared demon who is the president of the student council of the Babyls School for Demons. Although she is dignified and is highly respected by the student population, she is also a girl who is secretly a fan of the human world, especially a romance manga named "First Love Memories". Ameri was the first demon to suspect that Iruma is a human despite the common belief in Demon World that humans are mythical. She later confirms her suspicions and becomes friends with Iruma and develops strong feelings for him, although Iruma is not aware that she knows he is a human. Later it is revealed that her mother was a human girl. Her rank is Vau (Rank 6), the highest among the students of Babyls.
Both her original and her localized name makes reference to the biblical figure Azazel.
Clara Valac (ウァラク・クララ, Waraku Kurara)
Voiced by: Ayaka Asai (Japanese); Kayli Mills (English)
A highly odd (even by demon standards) and energetic Valac girl who constantly wants to play. Her bloodline ability allows her to pull out anything she has seen from her pockets, and she had to bribe other demons with snacks to play with her until she met Iruma. Iruma told Clara he doesn't need anything since he truly enjoyed playing with her, which boosts Clara's confidence and she soon becomes best friends with Iruma and Alice. She later also develops feelings for Iruma and vows to make Iruma enchanted by her. She was placed in the Misfit Class alongside Iruma and Alice due to her various comical antics causing trouble for the entire school. Her familiar is a rare indescribable creature called Falfal and she is currently ranked as Daleth (Rank 4).
Her localized name makes reference to the goetic demon Valac.
Kalego Naberius (ナベリウス・カルエゴ, Naberiusu Karuego)
Voiced by: Daisuke Ono (Japanese); D. C. Douglas (English)
Iruma's homeroom teacher. Not knowing Iruma was human when teaching students how to summon familiars, Kalego was summoned by him by accident due to his mark being on the summon sheet. His familiar form is that of a small owl-like creature with bat wings and small black horns. His rank is Cheth (Rank 8), the highest of any demon teacher at the Babyls School for Demons, with the exception of the headmaster, Sullivan, whose rank is Tet (Rank 9), and his friend, Balam Shichirou, who holds the same rank. Seemingly aloof and skeptic, in reality, he deeply cares for his students and their well-being, though he tends to twist situations so he can punish the Misfit Class for amusement.
Both his original and his localized name makes reference to the goetic demon Naberius, further reinforced by his bloodline ability which summons a three-headed hound.
Sullivan (サリバン, Sariban)
Voiced by: Takaya Kuroda (Japanese); Kyle Hebert (English)
The headmaster of the Babyls School for Demons and a demon who appears as an older man. He is one of the three demons in the Demon World who ranks as a Tet (Rank 9) and is one of the most powerful and influential demons in society. Thus, he is a possible candidate for the new Demon King since the disappearance of the last Demon King. Sullivan is also the demon that buys and subsequently adopts Iruma as his grandson. He did this so he could fill the void he felt every time he went to a meeting with his fellow Tet ranking friends, who said outstanding things about their own grandchildren. Sullivan is also responsible for granting Iruma the ability to read and understand the demon language through magic. He adores his new grandson and showers him with gifts and attention. In an effort to help Iruma blend in, he placed him along with Alice and Clara in the Abnormal Class; under the belief that strange students would camouflage him.
Before the Demon King's disappearance, Sullivan was his attendant, affectionally nicknamed "Sacchan" by him.
Opera (オペラ)
Voiced by: Mitsuki Saiga (Japanese); Brian Anderson (English)
Lord Sullivan's assistant, who appears as an androgynous and gender neutral cat-eared demon and also works as a secretary of sorts. Opera lives in the same house as Sullivan and Iruma, and manages the laundry, cooking, timetabling and transport for the two of them. They have a master-servant relationship, with Sullivan relying heavily on Opera's abilities and advice to keep him on track and away from distractions. Opera is one of the few demons that knows Iruma's true identity. Opera, for some reason, has little to no expression of emotions on their face but rather it shows on Opera's ears. Opera's rank is currently unknown, but they were Kalego's senior during their tenure at Babyls as students and is the only person who Kalego genuinely seems to fear.

=== Misfit Class Demons ===
The Misfit Class (問題児アブノーマルクラス Abunōmaru Kurasu?, lit. Abnormal Class) is a special class of first-year troublemakers created by Sullivan to hide Iruma amongst the demons due to his sudden popularity in his first day, hoping that their bigger notoriety at the time would mask Iruma's own.

Most of them were initially looked down on, being considered "freaks" and occupying a shabby classroom near the school's garbage disposal center. Their various exploits, however, such as acquiring the Royal One (the Demon King's classroom back in his school days), saving an amusement park from evil demon beasts, harvesting the fabled Legend Leaf during the Harvest Festival, and winning the Music Festival with a perfect score and a personal commendation from the Demon King's former musician, have changed their reputation to "awesome freaks". They have also been unofficially called "The Thirteen Crowns of Babyls" by the student body.

Sabro Sabnock (サブノック・サブロ, Sabunokku Saburo)
Voiced by: Takuya Satō (Japanese); Ray Chase (English)
He is the second son of the prestigious Sabnock family, with his bloodline magic being "Weapon Creation". He can create a weapon from anything he bites and wears a necklace of different materials around his neck. He has an intimidating appearance being roughly 8 ft. tall and very well-built, making himself the physically strongest. He comes off as ambitious and quite open with his desires. His goal is to become the next Demon King purely because it is the highest rank one can achieve in the Demon World. During the entrance ceremony, he attacked a teacher believing it would be the quickest way to gain a higher rank, but it was really the quickest way to being in the Misfit Class. He gains respect for Iruma after the Demon Rank placement exams and views him as his rival, although power-wise he clashes with Alice the most. His familiar is a Kelpie and his rank is Daleth (Rank 4). Both his original and his localized name make reference to the goetic demon Sabnock. He is related to Baal, the main antagonist of the series.
Keroli Crocell / Kuromu (クロケル・ケロリ / くろむ, Kurokeru Kerori / Kuromu)
Voiced by: Nao Tōyama (Japanese); Xanthe Huynh (English)
A humanoid female demon, who is seemingly the most normal student in the Misfit Class. Although she exhibits a shy and reserved personality in school, she secretly lives a double life as the evi-dol Kuromu, exhibiting a confident and hot-headed personality that made her the most famous evi-dol in the Netherworld. As a student, she wears special enchanted glasses that prevent the other students from recognizing her evi-dol identity. She joined the Misfit Class due to her work schedule working well with the Class' abnormal school schedule. Her bloodline magic, "Ice Facade", allows her to create ice from her body, though she would overheat from overuse, and if combined with emotional instability, can cause a fever that can only be cured by another family member. Her rank is Daleth (Rank 4) and her familiars are Snow Fox King and Blizzard Wolf, the strongest beasts she tamed in the Harvest Festival. Her localized name makes reference to the goetic demon Crocell.
Jazz M. Andro (アンドロ・M・ジャズ, Andoro M Jazu)
Voiced by: Tetsuya Kakihara (Japanese); Ryan Colt Levy (English)
He is the second son of the Andro family and his family's ability is Furtive Glance (Pit). It simultaneously allows him to identify objects on a target and the shortest route to steal them, which he can then combine with his family's pickpocketing technique to extend his fingers like snakes and steal the object he desired. He joined the Misfit Class due to getting caught pickpocketing other students on the day of the entrance ceremony (which, in his words, is out of habit). His rank is Daleth (Rank 4) and his familiar is a Split Wolf. Both his localized and his original name make reference to the goetic demon Andromalius, further reinforced by the association with snakes and thieves.
Lied Shax (シャックス・リード, Shakkusu Rīdo)
Voiced by: Yoshitaka Yamaya (Japanese); Brandon Winckler (English)
An elf-like demon who is a game enthusiast and enjoys the thrills of high-stakes gaming. He was placed in the Misfit Class due to a gaming session gone wrong on the day of the entrance ceremony, resulting in three students being hospitalized. Shax's bloodline magic, "Sense Stealer (Controller)", allows him to steal and use one of his target's five senses, turning the corresponding organ on himself black. After a special training leading to the Harvest Festival, Shax's focus has improved to the point where he can take two senses at once if his focus is hard enough, as well as "jump" between other people's senses to extend his ability's range, making it virtually limitless. His familiar is Clever Monkey and his rank is Daleth (Rank 4). His localized name makes reference to the goetic demon Shax.
Elizabetta Ix (イクス・エリサベッタ, Ikusu Elizabetta)
Voiced by: Kaede Hondo (Japanese); Natalie Hoover (English)
A tall beautiful humanoid demon, presumably from the succubus line. Her bloodline magic, "Full Love Gauge", causes those well-disposed to her to try and gain her favor, although it cannot be used on people she loves due to her personal creed. She is not good at studying and has a strong longing for pure love; she's a romantic at heart, having desired said love since childhood. Her familiars are 3 Floral Papillon and Her rank is Daleth (Rank 4).
Kamui Caim (カイム・カムイ, Kaimu Kamui)
Voiced by: Gakuto Kajiwara (Japanese); Mark Whitten (English)
A perverted owl-like demon who is a self-proclaimed gentleman. He was placed in the Misfit Class due to his non-stop sexual harassment of other female students and teachers. Caim's Bloodline magic, "Translation (Close Friends)", is a universal translator which lets him translate and talk with any languages of any species, including demon beasts. His familiar is unknown and his rank is Daleth (Rank 4). His localized name makes reference to the goetic demon Caim.
Picero Agares (アガレス・ピケロ, Agaresu Pikero)
Voiced by: Takuto Yoshinaga (Japanese); Brian Anderson (English)
A demon that is constantly napping on a cloud. He believes that "the minimum number of attendance days is good", and was placed in the Misfit Class for constantly either skipping or sleeping. His bloodline magic, "My Area", allows him to control nearby physical surfaces he deemed as his "territory". His familiar is unknown and his rank is Daleth (Rank 4). Both his localized name and his original name make reference to the goetic demon Agares.
Goemon Garp (ガープ・ゴエモン, Gāpu Goemon)
Voiced by: Genki Okawa (Japanese); Tom Bauer (English)
A demon whose face and body are covered in white hair and carries a katana around (which actually lacks a blade and only consists of the sheath and the hilt). Garp speaks in an old-fashioned manner, similar to a samurai. His bloodline magic, "Kamaitachi (Wind Blade)", allows him to create invisible blades out of wind, which he usually attaches to his bladeless katana, but can also be fired as sharp projectiles. He enjoys training with the sword, and his goal is to have 100 companions. He constantly tried to make Agares his companion, much to his chagrin. His familiar is unknown and his rank is Daleth (Rank 4). Both his localized name and his original name make reference to the demoniac figure Gaap.
Schneider Allocer (アロケル・シュナイダー, Arokeru Shunaidā)
Voiced by: Shun'ichi Toki (Japanese); Landon McDonald (English)
A demon with a lion-like face. He is actually very book-smart known as " The Beast King Of Knowledge". He placed 1st place in the Lecture test and got his first rank advancement. He mostly speaks in high-vocabulary and usually use quotes in his speech. Later on, he would also learn the art of deception, and uses a muffler-like mask to hide his changes in emotions for this purpose. His Familiar is called Smart Hawk and his rank is Daleth (Rank 4). Both his localized name and his original name make reference to the demoniac figure Allocer.
Soi Purson (プルソン・ソイ, Puruson Soi)
Voiced by: Setsuo Itō (Japanese); Khoi Dao (English)
A quiet demon that doesn't stick out very much, mostly because of his family creed of keeping a low profile at all times, due to their family's employment as spies by high-ranking demons. He was placed in the Misfit Class for his camouflage training by his father's request. Despite his initial invisibility to the rest of the Misfit Class, he is quite chatty when he opens up. Purson's Bloodline magic, "Anti-Recognition", allows him to physically disappear to ensure nobody detects him. This bloodline magic is also used by his family to create the anti-recognition glasses that is commercially available to the public. His rank is Daleth (Rank 4). Both his localized name and his original name make reference to the goetic demon Purson.

=== Other Demons ===
Eiko (エイコ)
Voiced by: Asami Haruna (Japanese); Skyler Davenport (English)
A demon girl that was saved by Iruma during the day of the entrance ceremony. She has a crush on Iruma, but never gets to talk to him after the familiar summoning ceremony due to being placed in a different class, resulting in a running gag where she attempts to approach him, but fails every time. After another incident where she is saved by Ameri, Eiko begins admiring her as well. She also becomes friends with Asmodeus due to their shared admiration for Iruma. Her familiar is a cloudy fox-like creature with bat wings.
Western Johnny Zagan (ザガン・ジョニー・ウエスタン, Zagan Jonī Uesutan)
Voiced by: Takuya Eguchi
A member of the student council at the Babyls School for Demons.
Quichelight Kimaris (キマリス・キッシュライト, Kimarisu Kisshuraito)
Voiced by: Taku Yashiro (Japanese); Tom Bauer (English)
A member of the student council at the Babyls School for Demons.
Kiriwo Amy (アミィ・キリヲ, Amii Kiriwo)
Voiced by: Ryōta Ōsaka (Japanese); Aleks Le (English)
A magically-weak third-year student who heads the Magical Apparatus Battler but got arrested for trying to destroy the school during Battler Party's Eve Countdown, leaving Iruma, Alice and Clara to take over the battler. He is also the leader of a demon criminal group known as the "Six Fingers", whose main goal is to return the Demon World to a savage and chaotic state. Kiriwo is shown to relish in the despair of others, and longs to see the look of despair on their faces. According to him, Iruma Suzuki is his destined enemy. His bloodline ability is Barrier and his rank was Bet (Rank 2) when he was arrested.
Shichirou Balam (バラム・シチロウ, Baramu Shichirou)
Voiced by: Katsuyuki Konishi (Japanese); Daman Mills (English)
A teacher at the Babyls School for Demons. He is good friends with Kalego as they were classmates when they were younger. Despite his looks, he is a very kind person. Balam is also one of the very few demons who know Iruma is a human. Balam helps Iruma with his classes by turning the lessons into storybooks; a hobby of his, being a good enough author to the point his stories can bring the readers to tears from how touching they are. He is also one of the demons in the school that is rank Chet (Rank 8). His Family Power is called " Buzzer " which lets him detect any lies or untruths. His name is inspired by the goetic demon Balam
Ari (アリ)
Voiced by: Shin-ichiro Miki (Japanese); Jalen K. Cassell (English)
Lomiere Ronove (ロノウェ・ロミエール, Ronōve Romiēru)
Voiced by: Tatsuhisa Suzuki (Japanese); Mach Dent (English)
A second year demon who is androphobic and consistently using his Charisma to influence others. He initially appears to challenge Ameri to a Dissolution Duel, and lost. He later was invited to the Student Council. He was also revealed to be the son of the owner of Walter Park. His name is inspired by the demoniac figure Ronove.
Bachiko Barbatos (バルバトス・バチコ, Barubatosu Bachiko)
Voiced by: Junko Takeuchi (Japanese); Ellie Dritch (English)
Professor Robin Balse's cousin from the main Barbatos family. She used her training times with Iruma to make him a chore boy and gopher, but begins training him for real at the request of Sullivan, who she deeply admires. Bachiko is also one of the few demons aware of Iruma's true identity as a human. In the past, she had trauma from failing to teach other demons her ability. She was known as a master archer, who can shoot 100 arrows, all in one bullseye. Her name is inspired by the demoniac figure Barbatos.
General Furfur (フルフル軍曹, Furufuru Gunsō)
Voiced by: Kishō Taniyama (Japanese); Kellen Goff (English)
One of the Three Demonic Heroes, a Demon Commander that was constantly on the frontline. Extremely manipulative and crafty, he dragged both Jazz and Schneider into a bar instead of training them as instructed by Kalego and tricked them with "a good time", only to put them into indentured servitude to the bar in order to pay off his own debts. He then challenged the duo daily with their freedom on the line, frequently taunting them every time they lose, much to their chagrin. It is implied that he did this to train them in the art of deception, and he did take some pride in them becoming master manipulators during the Harvest Festival. His name is inspired by the goetic demon Furfur.
Vepar (ウェパル, Weparu)
Voiced by: Mariko Kouda (Japanese); Courtney Lin (English)
A crybaby Siren Demon, who was also a member of the Three Demonic Heroes. She uses her water-based ability to train Picero and Goemon. Her name is inspired by the goetic demon Vepar.
Mr. Hat (Mr.ハット, Misutā Hatto)
Voiced by: Masami Iwasaki (Japanese); Kevin M. Connolly (English)
A Demon Beastmaster. He trained both Camui and Keroli in Demon Beast taming. He is a gentleman at heart, and fostered Keroli's ice-queen personality and Camui's gentlemanry.
Coco Orobas (オロバス・ココ, Orobasu Koko)
Voiced by: Hiroki Yasumoto
A student who is perpetually stuck as a "second-ranker" (mostly losing to the Misfit Class), causing others to mistake him as part of a cult that worships the number "2", much to his chagrin. He would then target the Misfit Class during the Harvest Festival, in order to break the rumors around him and become number one. His bloodline magic, "Trauma", allows him to cast a powerful illusory spell that shows the target their deepest fears (such as Iruma's friends finding out about his human heritage, or Elizabetta rejecting Shax), though Coco himself cannot see the illusion he created. His name is inspired by the goetic demon Orobas.
Ichiro Andrealphus (アンドロアフレス・イチロ, Andoroafuresu Ichiro)
Voiced by: Kentarō Kumagai
A hot-headed demon who was supposed to be a second-year, but got held back due to never attending school after his entrance ceremony and volunteered to fight in the battlefield instead. He and his brother Niro joined the Harvest Festival to find his mentor, General Furfur, who left the battlefield to mentor two Misfit Class members (Jazz and Schneider), and mistakes Sabro and Alice as his students based on their strength alone (who were actually taught by Balam), thus they challenge them to a duel throughout the Festival to reclaim their master. His bloodline magic, "Trigger", allows him to magically enhance his fighting words and gradually causes his enemies to lose all sense of reason and attack them in a blind rage, an ability he shared with his brother. His name is inspired by the goetic demon Andrealphus.
Niro Andrealphus (アンドロアフレス・ニロ, Andoroafuresu Niro)
Voiced by: Sho Nogami
Ichiro's younger brother, who joined him in his military exploits and got held back a year as well as a result. Compared to his brother, he's more level-headed and appeared to be the "brains" of the duo, but can still be as hot-headed and dumb as his brother at times. Same as Ichiro, his bloodline magic, "Trigger", allows him to magically enhance his fighting words and gradually causes his enemies to lose all sense of reason and attack them in a blind rage. His name is inspired by the goetic demon Andrealphus.
Derkila (デルキラ, Derukira)
Voiced by: Shinichiro Miki
The previous Demon King who mysteriously vanished for unknown reasons, sending the Netherworld in disarray. Said to have the power to shape the Netherworld itself to his whims, he's the one who created the Demon Ranking system and brought peace to the Netherworld. He once attended Babyls as a student, and the classroom he was placed to is now a sacred relic of the school, named "Royal One", which remains sealed until the Misfit Class acquired it with the entire faculty's permission.
Deeply respected and feared by the demonkind, the only people who can be casual to him are his attendant, Sullivan, and Amduscias Poro, a former Thirteen Crown and his classmate.

== Media ==
=== Manga ===
The series has been serialized in Akita Shoten's shōnen manga magazine Weekly Shōnen Champion since March 2, 2017. Akita Shoten has collected its chapters into individual tankōbon volumes, of which the first was released on July 7, 2017. As of October 7, 2026, 51 volumes have been released.

At Anime Expo 2022, Kodansha USA announced that they had licensed the series for English publication.

==== Spin-offs ====
A spin-off manga, titled Makai no Shuyaku wa Wareware da! (魔界の主役は我々だ！; "We Are the Main Characters of the Demon World!"), started serialization in Weekly Shōnen Champion on January 9, 2020. The first tankōbon volume was released on June 8, 2020. As of February 7, 2025, 21 volumes have been released. On October 16, 2024, it was announced the manga was cancelled due to external circumstances.

A further two manga spin-offs were announced on July 24, 2023. The first was a mafia spin-off written and illustrated by hiroja, titled Welcome to Demon School! Iruma-kun: IruMafia Edition, that began serialization in Bessatsu Shōnen Champion on September 12, 2023. The mafia spin-off was transferred to Weekly Shōnen Champion on December 11, 2025. The second was a five-chapter spin-off manga centered around Kalego Naberius written and illustrated by Nishi, titled Mairimashita! Iruma-kun: Kalego Gaiden, that was serialized in Weekly Shōnen Champion from December 7, 2023, to January 18, 2024.

During their panel at New York Comic Con 2024, Kodansha USA announced that they also licensed the mafia spin-off for English publication beginning in Q4 2025. During their panel at Anime Expo 2026, Kodansha USA announced that they had licensed the Kalego spin-off for English publication beginning in Q2 2027.

A spin-off manga written and illustrated by Konisuke, titled Boku Dōmei no Game-dō, began serialization on the Champion Buzz digital supplement of Weekly Shōnen Champion on March 5, 2026.

=== Anime ===
An anime television series adaptation was announced in February 2019. The 23-episode series is animated by BN Pictures and directed by Makoto Moriwaki, with Kazuyuki Fudeyasu handling series composition, and Akimitsu Honma composing the music. NHK and NHK Enterprises are credited for production. The series aired from October 5, 2019, to March 7, 2020, on NHK Educational TV. Da Pump performed the series' opening theme song "Magical Babyrinth," while Yū Serizawa performed the series' ending theme song "Debikyū" (デビきゅー). Crunchyroll and Muse Communication are streaming the series in their selected regions. A second season was announced and aired for 21 episodes from April 17, 2021, to September 11, 2021. The staff returned to reprise their roles. Da Pump performed the second season's opening theme song "No! No! Satisfaction!", while Amatsuki performed the second season's ending theme song "Kokoro Show Time" (ココロショータイム, Kokoro Shō Taimu).

On May 18, 2021, it was announced that Sentai Filmworks and Crunchyroll had acquired the home video rights for the anime.

On September 11, 2021, the Twitter account for the anime announced that a third season is in development. It aired from October 8, 2022, to March 4, 2023. Fantastics from Exile Tribe performed the opening theme song "Girigiri Ride it Out" (ギリギリ Ride it out; On the Edge Ride it Out), while Wednesday Campanella performed the ending theme song "Nabe Bugyо̄" (鍋奉行; Hotpot Boss).

On November 17, 2024, it was announced that a fourth season was in production. It aired from April 4 to September 27, 2026. Penthouse performed the opening theme song "Ichi Ni no San" (一二三（いちにのさん）).

On September 27, 2026, at the "DEVIL'S PARTY! 2" special event, it was announced that a new anime film is in production, which will tell a brand-new story.

== Reception ==
By January 2020, the first fifteen volumes of the manga had over 2.5 million copies in circulation. By September 2020, the manga had over 5 million copies in circulation. By March 2026, the manga had 20 million copies in circulation.

The anime adaptation was positively received. Reviewing the first episode, Vrai Kaiser praised it for being "a bit of fall sweetness," praising the style, the promise of prominent female characters, hints of a larger plot, heartening that the ending or opening visuals aren't "particularly fanservicey," and the series is building up to "a mostly gender-balanced cast," while saying that it will likely be a "solidly middle-of-the-pack show" but put a smile on their face. When reviewing the first three episodes, Kaiser said that while the series doesn't "have an overabundance of ambition," the stories are executed with "enthusiasm and a kind of energy that...feels accessible to everyone," but praises the series for having writing that doesn't exploit or wallow in "dark machinations behind the scenes," and said that while the series wasn't their favorite for the season, they looked forward to "relaxing with [it] every week", and said they would be sticking with it until the end.

Welcome to Demon School! Iruma-kun: IruMafia Edition was nominated for the 10th Next Manga Awards in the print category and was ranked second.
