= Welcome to Demon School! Iruma-kun: IruMafia Edition =

Japanese manga series

- First tankōbon volume cover

魔入りました！入間くん if Episode of 魔フィア (Mairimashita! Iruma-kun if: Episōdo obu Mafia)
- Genre: Adventure, comedy
- Created by: Osamu Nishi
- Manga
- Written by: hiroja
- Published by: Akita Shoten
- English publisher: NA: Kodansha USA
- Imprint: Shōnen Champion Comics
- Magazine: Bessatsu Shōnen Champion; (September 12, 2023 – October 10, 2025); Weekly Shōnen Champion; (December 11, 2025 – present)
- Original run: September 12, 2023 – present
- Volumes: 9
- Anime television series
- Directed by: Keiichiro Kawaguchi
- Written by: Kazuyuki Fudeyasu
- Music by: Yayoi Sekimukai
- Studio: Tatsunoko Production
- Original network: NHK General TV
- Original run: January 4, 2027 – scheduled
- Episodes: 12

Welcome to Demon School! Iruma-kun: IruMafia Edition (Japanese: 魔入りました！入間くん if Episode of 魔フィア, Hepburn: Mairimashita! Iruma-kun if: Episōdo obu Mafia) is a Japanese manga series written and illustrated by hiroja. It was initially serialized in Akita Shoten's shōnen manga magazine Bessatsu Shōnen Magazine between September 2023 and October 2025, before being transferred to its Weekly Shōnen Champion magazine in December 2025. The series is an alternate universe mafia spin-off of Osamu Nishi's Welcome to Demon School! Iruma-kun manga series. An anime television series adaptation produced by Tatsunoko Production is set to premiere in January 2027.

== Synopsis ==
Iruma is a poor boy living in the slums of a city. One day, he spots an injured man by his house, and helps him recover. He later finds out that the man he helped out was Don Sullivan, the leader of the Babyl Mafia. Sullivan returns to Iruma, and asks him to become his grandson and join the mafia.

== Characters ==
Iruma Suzuki (鈴木入間, Suzuki Iruma)
Voiced by: Ayumu Murase
Opera (オペラ)
Voiced by: Mitsuki Saiga
Kalego Naberius (ナベリウス・カルエゴ, Naberiusu Karuego)
Voiced by: Daisuke Ono
Alice Asmodeus (アスモデウス・アリス, Asumodeusu Arisu)
Voiced by: Ryōhei Kimura
Clara Valac (ウァラク・クララ, Waraku Kurara)
Voiced by: Ayaka Asai
Ameri Azazel (アザゼル・アメリ, Azazeru Ameri)
Voiced by: Saori Hayami

== Media ==
=== Manga ===
Written and illustrated by hiroja, Welcome to Demon School! Iruma-kun: IruMafia Edition was initially serialized in Akita Shoten's shōnen manga magazine Bessatsu Shōnen Champion from September 12, 2023, to October 10, 2025. The series resumed serialization in Weekly Shōnen Champion on December 11, 2025, with its chapters published on a bi-weekly basis. The series' chapters have been compiled into nine tankōbon volumes as of October 2026.

During their panel at New York Comic Con 2024, Kodansha USA announced that they had licensed the series for English publication in Q4 2025.

=== Anime ===
An anime television series adaptation was announced on February 4, 2026. It will be produced by Tatsunoko Production and directed by Keiichiro Kawaguchi, with Kazuyuki Fudeyasu handling series composition, Kenji Fujisaki designing the characters, and Yayoi Sekimukai composing the music. The 12-episode series is set to premiere on January 4, 2027, on NHK General TV.

== Reception ==
The series was ranked second in the print category at the tenth Next Manga Awards in 2024.
