= Lists of angels =

The following are lists of angels:

- List of angels in theology, a list of angels in religion, theology, astrology, and magic
  - List of spirits appearing in grimoires, listing spirits, including angels, whose names show up in these grimoires for invocative ritual purposes
    - List of angels in Ars Paulina, the first part containing the angels of the hours of the day and night; the second part dealing with the angels of the Zodiac signs
    - List of angels in Sefer HaRazim, containing the names of the angels belonging to each of the Seven Heavens
- List of angels in fiction, a list of notable angels that appear in works of fiction
  - Angels (Neon Genesis Evangelion), fictional entities in the anime television series Neon Genesis Evangelion
  - Angels (Supernatural), extremely powerful spiritual beings in the television series Supernatural
  - List of films about angels, a list of films where angels appear

== See also ==
- Lists of demons
