= List of angels in Sefer HaRazim =

Below is a list of angels in Sefer HaRazim, a Jewish magical text that dates to approximately 300 AD.

The spellings of the angel names in this list follow those of Rebiger & Schäfer (2010). Note that the spellings in Morgan (1983) and other sources often differ. The names are transcribed directly from their Hebrew spellings, without any additional vowels. Illegible letters are marked with questions marks (?) by Rebiger & Schäfer (2010).

In total, nearly 1,100 angel names are listed in Sefer HaRazim.

== List of angels ==
Of the Seven Heavens, the first six have lengthy lists of angel names. The 7th heaven is home to the Throne of Glory and the 4 ḥayyot.

=== 1st Heaven ===
Below are the angels who serve the seven princes Aurpnial, Tigrh, Dnhl, Klmial/Hlmia, Asimur, Psbr, and Bual. Each of the princes is served by about 30 to 75 angels.

1. Aurpnial:
  1. Kumru
  2. Dmna
  3. Anuk
  4. Alpiuqṭinia
  5. Pṭrupi
  6. Gmti
  7. ˁaaur
  8. Nrntq
  9. Auth
  10. Maut
  11. Prukh
  12. Aqilah
  13. Trquuh
  14. Bruq
  15. Srurh
  16. Atngi
  17. Gilani
  18. Tst
  19. Arnub
  20. Ašmi
  21. Aṣš
  22. Kpun
  23. Brki
  24. Gršum
  25. Prian
  26. Ššmˁ
  27. Anba
  28. Ntgal
  29. Aral
  30. Anip
  31. Ṭruauš
  32. ˁbdial
  33. Izun
  34. Aluk
  35. Mi
  36. Al
  37. Llp
  38. Iḥspt
  39. Rḥgl
  40. Bumasi
  41. Ibti
  42. Arnial
  43. Subun
  44. Brial
  45. Zbrial
  46. Agdlk
  47. Mugal
  48. Gaupr
  49. Bilrh
  50. Diglal
  51. Ṭt
  52. Udl
  53. Sklh
  54. Abral
  55. Bsil
  56. Siqmh
  57. Aškh
  58. Iutnh
  59. Ha
  60. Lbh
  61. Hlian
  62. Aptial
  63. Taumual
  64. Alal
  65. Ntial
  66. Apikh
  67. Tlgial
  68. Nˁnh
  69. Astral
2. Tigrh:
  1. Abstr
  2. Mrms
  3. Brkim
  4. Kmšu
  5. Brital
  6. Adir
  7. Gba
  8. Aqrba
  9. Akbur
  10. Kbur
  11. Rulh
  12. Šlhbin
  13. Ašlbh
  14. Mštub
  15. Grḥta
  16. Ḥgra
  17. Aiṭmal
  18. Ḥgl
  19. Lgh
  20. Mnutial
  21. Tṭmial
  22. Aubrit
  23. Abrita
  24. Bimlial
  25. Ḥštk
  26. Rtš
  27. Astirup
  28. Aurial
  29. Aškib
  30. Mlkial
  31. Aruš
  32. Hur
  33. Kšuua
  34. Hmk
  35. Rgḥ
  36. Umbut
  37. Hṣnipl
  38. Ptšuna
  39. Ašpur
  40. Arq
  41. Qnumal
  42. Bhial
  43. Gdial
  44. Arq
  45. Imumial
  46. Pḥg
  47. Rḥgal
  48. Rgrial
  49. Aruš
  50. Huṭina
  51. Dlkt
  52. Tkl
  53. Tlial
  54. Ual
  55. Muhar
  56. Altial
  57. Puttra
  58. Lpum
  59. Aur
  60. Šmr
  61. Arial
  62. Asṭurin
  63. Aziti
  64. Aisṭursi
  65. Raupit
  66. Brgmi
  67. Rumiaial
  68. Sigra
  69. Abikal
  70. Ptual
  71. Qumial
  72. Dgugra
  73. Dlgial
  74. Srusṭial
3. Dnhl:
  1. Aun
  2. Rbbu
  3. Au
  4. Bšal
  5. Brtubual
  6. Plusual
  7. Rḥbual
  8. Atial
  9. Krbtun
  10. Brba
  11. Ruauninu
  12. Aink
  13. Atglh
  14. Autu
  15. Aštnial
  16. Ašpr
  17. Hgrial
  18. Amikal
  19. At
  20. Ršu
  21. Aurial
  22. Armud
  23. Astun
  24. Abial
  25. Aiaur
  26. Askira
  27. Lpual
  28. Alˁšh
  29. Sspual
  30. Lmuši
  31. Arut
  32. Tirum
  33. Alpiuaimik
  34. Argla
  35. Muggla
  36. Alial
4. Klmial / Hlmia:
  1. Abrih
  2. Amrhi
  3. Rḥbial
  4. Rmnai
  5. Amnhr
  6. Amnik
  7. Psasiia
  8. Rḥbial
  9. Gulial
  10. Arpri
  11. Gmti
  12. Aurnial
  13. Pirbihu
  14. Huarn
  15. Lṭmal
  16. Auri
  17. Tumugi
  18. Ansdial
  19. Mnial
  20. Inmitu
  21. Sṭiṭu
  22. Ṣntqnu
  23. Qnial
  24. Burtiam
  25. Aniap
  26. Rsput
  27. Brbun
  28. Bhin
  29. Dspb
  30. Alism
  31. Ḥlqial
  32. Ṭrqpu
  33. Qrsṭu
  34. Mikha'el
  35. Gavri'el
  36. Sbnial
  37. Aḥzq
  38. Ḥsdial
  39. Aḥsp
  40. Atial
  41. Pdnum
  42. Gdial
  43. Mlkial
5. Asimur:
  1. Btuar
  2. Škinttk
  3. Aduka
  4. Tqu
  5. Mqpa
  6. Lhba
  7. ˁl
  8. ˁr
  9. ˁli
  10. ˁuz
  11. ???ial
  12. Knur
  13. Bnš
  14. Qrba
  15. Srk
  16. Ḥlšial
  17. Hrmˁ
  18. ˁkr
  19. Hug
  20. Mlkih
  21. Prˁtu?
  22. Adˁt
  23. Qup
  24. Mnmlk
  25. Dinmur
  26. Alpnṭus
  27. Didriu?k
  28. Klnh
  29. Ninḥia
  30. Dṣnḥia
  31. Mlgdm
  32. Dimḥn
  33. Librnk
  34. Ttqhh
  35. Apnial
  36. Ibiṭur
  37. Dknsur
  38. ?mgdl
  39. Lhtqup
  40. ˁli
  41. Gdgdl
  42. Pruṣ
  43. Msruṣ
  44. Kbir
  45. Mus
  46. Diqna
  47. Nšr
  48. Tub
  49. Drumial
  50. Dira?
  51. Dmula
  52. Did?al
  53. Tˁi
  54. Kr?
  55. Atr
  56. ˁqb
  57. Hunmuda
  58. Anqiu
  59. Gurial
  60. Ṣbial
  61. Ṣbiudˁ
  62. ??qr
  63. ?dut
  64. Rgbial
6. Psbr:
  1. Lunigial
  2. Qrunit
  3. Šuburun
  4. Slkirm
  5. ˁuzial
  6. Pnial
  7. Tsmial
  8. Hmmial
  9. Ṣimial
  10. Nummum
  11. Girṭia
  12. Kairba
  13. Zunmṭum
  14. Asmial
  15. Ṭrrial
  16. Hupnial
  17. Qrmial
  18. Qlpiia
  19. Armial
  20. ˁrmun
  21. Hrmur
  22. ˁglial
  23. Kprial
  24. Qḥnial
  25. Šbukria
  26. Armunum
  27. Ṭunimum
  28. Pṣiṭal
  29. Ḥṭpial
  30. Prsumin
  31. Nḥlial
7. Bual:
  1. Ṭhrrial
  2. Rbbal
  3. Mḥšin
  4. Ahud
  5. Rdam
  6. Bnital
  7. Sdura
  8. Ahzih
  9. Iprupial
  10. Mnsial
  11. ˁlzial
  12. Hbrusm
  13. Qrumial
  14. Rmial
  15. Lhsn
  16. Slsial
  17. Ahial
  18. Abr
  19. Aubr
  20. Srungial
  21. Rual
  22. Šmšial
  23. Špṭial
  24. Rḥbial
  25. Aḥmura
  26. Mrmrin
  27. Anup
  28. Alprṭ
  29. Aumigra
  30. Qrurnm
  31. Srpial
  32. Grrial
  33. Arruda
  34. Pruṭnial
  35. Agmial
  36. Rhṭial
  37. Ritrnn
  38. Ḥzal
  39. Ptial
  40. Glgla
  41. Rmnṣr
  42. Ḥial

=== 2nd Heaven ===
Below are the angels of the 12 steps. Each step has about 8 to 20 angels.

1. Step 1
  1. Aḥmrial
  2. Drial
  3. Dṣial
  4. Lhsṭial
  5. Zbdial
  6. Dbnial
  7. Mbkal
  8. Sṭbral
2. Step 2
  1. ˁzzial
  2. Ḥbnal
  3. Bṣṣial
  4. Išˁial
  5. Blqial
  6. Arpsa
  7. Mruaut
  8. Rupupum
  9. Amnial
  10. Nḥmial
  11. Pbzubum
  12. ˁnual
3. Step 3
  1. Iḥial
  2. Rputu
  3. Alual
  4. Brkial
  5. ˁli
  6. Sipus
  7. Pnimur
  8. Alˁzr
  9. Bklial
  10. Kmšial
  11. Aurrial
  12. Iˁzal
  13. Kppial
  14. Pspal
4. Step 4
  1. Qsghial
  2. Mlkial
  3. Auṭbin
  4. Pgrial
  5. ˁnnial
  6. Klmiia
  7. Aumual
  8. Amṭpr
  9. Buzziba
  10. Alpral
  11. Prinial
  12. Ṣˁq
  13. Mriia
  14. Prumial
  15. Ašmrˁ
  16. Iḥudia
  17. Iḥzial
5. Step 5
  1. Quna
  2. Qrial
  3. ʿtunial
  4. Nqrial
  5. Ail
  6. Iabut
  7. Iau
  8. Bksrau
  9. Kbsmibum
  10. Sbtkau
  11. Amrial
  12. Ial
  13. Ial
  14. Mksadu
6. Step 6
  1. Abihud
  2. Nqud
  3. Hlqial
  4. Shrial
  5. Arik
  6. Gslial
  7. Tmnial
  8. Smnial
  9. Rgˁial
  10. Iqumia
  11. Šmu
  12. Hud
  13. Mḥrial
  14. Ḥmal
  15. Srikum
  16. Qnḥ
  17. Qnial
  18. Pnsun
7. Step 7
  1. Ptḥih
  2. Razi'el
  3. Agrial
  4. Tgriab
  5. Adrun
  6. Prqṭa
  7. Qsipur
  8. Abrial
  9. Štqial
  10. ˁmial
  11. Sunbrrum
8. Step 8
  1. Abrq
  2. Brqial
  3. Atnial
  4. ˁuzial
  5. Bsrial
  6. Rˁmal
  7. Qršial
  8. Suinial
  9. ˁual
  10. Pnal
  11. Mrsṭm
  12. Mkmbal
  13. Šmual
  14. ˁmnual
  15. Mḥlual
  16. Hud
  17. Hud
9. Step 9
  1. Grurial
  2. Ṭbsial
  3. Pr?ial (Note: Morgan (1983) has Ptḥiʾl (פתחיאל).)
  4. Qrbauq
  5. Qrba
  6. Ṣial
  7. Pral
  8. Pral
10. Step 10
  1. Dbrial
  2. Rbal
  3. Šbqial
  4. Atbial
  5. Smnial
  6. Mrmlal
  7. Rnal
  8. Ṣptk
  9. Iḥial
  10. Alṣdq
  11. Abnp
  12. ˁzmal
  13. Mkmual
  14. Trkial
  15. Rbmal
11. Step 11
  1. Prial
  2. Rmual
  3. Arinuš
  4. Aminal
  5. Sḥial
  6. ˁqrial
  7. Ḥrnual
  8. Drqual
  9. Šlmnal
  10. Asṭrial
  11. Mṭual
  12. Aglglhun
  13. Admut
  14. Pdial
  15. Nptmiut
12. Step 12
  1. Asṭrmi
  2. Kraut
  3. Bmraut
  4. Bdnrial
  5. Šurlial
  6. Alhnm
  7. Brgal
  8. Pual
  9. Ppal
  10. Upktini
  11. Klptun
  12. Kibubuk
  13. Aimṭun
  14. Arṭmibtun
  15. Mšmi?run
  16. Spṭg
  17. Prniga
  18. Psibṭur
  19. Banišun

=== 3rd Heaven ===
Below are the angels who serve the three princes Ibnial, Rhṭial, and Dlqial. Each of the princes is served by about 20 angels.

1. Ibnial:
  1. Špṭial
  2. Adrial
  3. Thrrial
  4. Bnkšial
  5. Ṣtpial
  6. Dlpial
  7. Kṣnṭal
  8. Tturial
  9. Aˁsial
  10. Amgrial
  11. Mltpial
  12. Dbqal
  13. Krsal
  14. Srial
  15. Ttpial
  16. Qsmial
  17. Bsrial
  18. Qsṭhrial
  19. Nˁdrial
2. Rhṭial:
  1. Azra
  2. Zrgri
  3. Gpˁm
  4. Tˁzma
  5. Lbsrpal
  6. Gral
  7. Tmnial
  8. ˁqibial
  9. Gnḥ
  10. Pnial
  11. Arqb
  12. Ṣpiqial
  13. Mušal
  14. Pupial
  15. Ntnial
  16. Zkrial
  17. Aknpp
  18. Aḥsp
  19. Nkmka
  20. Qlial
  21. Drumial
3. Dlqial:
  1. Nuri'el
  2. Aulial
  3. Mlṭih
  4. Ḥulial
  5. Ḥrhal
  6. Šlḥual
  7. Ṣgrial
  8. Bmnial
  9. Šqrial
  10. Smnual
  11. Ṣbrial
  12. Ṭudal
  13. Tumkial
  14. Amnual
  15. Tlsṭp
  16. Zṭhnual
  17. Mgnual
  18. Amgnan

=== 4th Heaven ===
Below are the angels who serve the princes of the day and night. Each of the princes is served by about 30 angels.

1. Day:
  1. Abra
  2. Mbas
  3. Mrmraut
  4. Mubtial
  5. Mrait
  6. Ṣdqial
  7. Uḥsn
  8. Ḥsial
  9. Rbal
  10. Abuk
  11. Mial
  12. Britkma
  13. Mrmai
  14. Pial
  15. Gavri'el
  16. Aštun
  17. Tqpial
  18. Alial
  19. Ḥlial
  20. Quršial
  21. Hdrial
  22. Irumial
  23. Iršial
  24. Mlkial
  25. Agrital
  26. Lhgial
  27. Mṭrial
  28. Bilaual
  29. Nubial
  30. Hrmial
  31. Nkbdial
2. Night:
  1. Prsial
  2. Ṣrṣial
  3. ˁgial
  4. Nburial
  5. Ṭmial
  6. Šrial
  7. Ašmˁal
  8. Špṭial
  9. Šaual
  10. Rddial
  11. Ṭˁsial
  12. Lbbal
  13. Bgdial
  14. Mnhal
  15. Lmial
  16. Pdial
  17. Prhal
  18. Lbdial
  19. Rbbal
  20. Ḥmuqial
  21. Bghial
  22. Nṣrial
  23. Qpṣial
  24. Rˁdnial
  25. Ḥsnial
  26. Asppial
  27. Ḥlial
  28. Šmšial
  29. Zḥuḥal
  30. Rmbial
  31. Kzal
  32. Qumnial
  33. Ḥrial

=== 5th Heaven ===
Below are the angels who serve the princes Šˁpial (month of Nisan), Rghil (month of Iyyar), Dirnaur (month of Siwan), Tˁnṣun (month of Tammuz), Tdnrgar (month of Av), Mural (month of Elul), Phrrun (month of Tishre), Ildng (month of Marḥeshwan), Anrgnur (month of Kislew), Mpnial (month of Ṭevet), Ḥšbdrum (month of Shevaṭ), and Abrkial (month of Adar). Each of the princes is served by about 30 angels.

1. Nisan:
  1. Aurial
  2. Mlkirm
  3. ˁših
  4. Iqšial
  5. Iˁlt
  6. Ismbih
  7. Irial
  8. Amrin
  9. Umikh
  10. Špṭih
  11. ˁnih
  12. Iušr
  13. Plṭ
  14. Smkial
  15. Ṣurial
  16. Ṣbirq
  17. Mlkih
  18. Anṭpun
  19. Psisa
  20. ˁbral
  21. Alm
  22. Ašrk
  23. Mplal
  24. Nsm
  25. Ṣpun
  26. Ṣuni
  27. ˁuzr
  28. Nqp
  29. Akmial
  30. Hqmih
  31. Brm
  32. ˁd
  33. Bnub
  34. Bṭr
  35. Asrial
2. Iyyar:
  1. Ṣpnial
  2. Sspun
  3. Qrsmk
  4. ˁsial
  5. Plṭih
  6. Pbr
  7. Ggliiš
  8. Nkpiš
  9. Nkpiš
  10. ˁrum
  11. Mˁinik
  12. ˁd
  13. Qnal
  14. Qmḥ
  15. Abrqi
  16. Uihur
  17. Agniia
  18. Prsiaq
  19. Sgmun
  20. Gluš
  21. Gbhnn
  22. Drsgr
  23. Ḥpsi
  24. Askmuk
  25. Ṭrsp
  26. Ḥṣpun
  27. Qṭnial
  28. Bugia
  29. Hrlm
  30. Nrib
  31. Ahbi
  32. Ṣpiau
  33. Buraum
  34. Plilut
3. Siwan:
  1. Amrial
  2. Tgrial
  3. Tusmun
  4. Nsipa
  5. Mlmur
  6. Nˁlm
  7. Mˁmit
  8. ˁziqrm
  9. Šmiqrn
  10. Nšqip
  11. Amrš
  12. Plˁmzg
  13. Asriš
  14. Asgil
  15. Prtun
  16. Iḥuial
  17. Dliia
  18. Hzinur
  19. Mrzup
  20. Abnṣur
  21. Ṣnn
  22. Rbbm
  23. Ṣpnih
  24. Mqṭˁir
  25. ˁulin
  26. Ṭglial
  27. Mˁnual
  28. Zrzur
  29. Bbqṭun
  30. Grisr
4. Tammuz:
  1. Nuri'el
  2. Ṣpuriu
  3. Asp
  4. Smrbih
  5. Srˁk
  6. Arrik
  7. Ngrun
  8. Glip
  9. Glgl
  10. Dhrutim
  11. Pqmin
  12. Dmk
  13. Puriia
  14. Llirqt
  15. Nglw
  16. Bsriap
  17. Tˁnk
  18. Lu
  19. Asriap
  20. Hud
  21. Nsbi
  22. Rziia
  23. Ṣrin
  24. Iduˁ
  25. Qṣpiia
  26. Nrṭun
  27. Hṣpn
  28. Pspnia
  29. Mrri
5. Av:
  1. Brqial
  2. Msiˁa
  3. Amrim
  4. Nˁnk
  5. Buṭ
  6. Mdrk
  7. Amsṭlial
  8. Ksirup
  9. ˁrsim
  10. Nšgup
  11. Pgr
  12. Ḥblug
  13. Glmud
  14. Gbriq
  15. Amtiḥ
  16. Ngnial
  17. Rḥist
  18. Qna
  19. Plial
  20. Qṣsp
  21. Nšgurp
  22. Dbrq
  23. Anuṭrq
  24. Trubu
  25. Nsll
  26. Slulup
  27. Mkr
  28. Iriˁ
  29. Ṣipr
  30. Akr
6. Elul:
  1. Ḥnial
  2. ˁuri
  3. Izˁr
  4. Srzikul
  5. Mṭnim
  6. Dnual
  7. Mtniial
  8. Nrpa
  9. Mkšip
  10. Igrun
  11. Npi
  12. Rḥpun
  13. Ṣnpi
  14. Slˁi
  15. Pˁrr
  16. Ap
  17. Alial
  18. Smsial
  19. Iuaš
  20. Glli
  21. Dpnu
  22. Imla
  23. Gul
  24. Mulial
  25. Srpr
  26. Nspa
  27. Gsupi
  28. Mbrsip
  29. Drial
  30. Ṭrsial
  31. Alilgbi
7. Tishre:
  1. Ṣurial
  2. Triqm
  3. Gavri'el
  4. Iubbial
  5. Šnunal
  6. Mtrun
  7. Quliia
  8. Drial
  9. Mtˁim
  10. Mrˁim
  11. Nbrk
  12. Ašrun
  13. Šqrun
  14. Pgilm
  15. ˁrsbun
  16. Aspiia
  17. Hgiun
  18. ˁnial
  19. Ššpur
  20. Qmm
  21. Alsn
  22. Mšusp
  23. Slmial
  24. Ṣṣqumial
  25. Brqrq
  26. Ubun
  27. Alisp
  28. Muri
  29. Zrḥih
  30. Auri
  31. Mbrii
8. Marḥeshwan:
  1. Brkial
  2. Ḥzmal
  3. Rˁmial
  4. Nbub
  5. Alisp
  6. Blial
  7. Arzp
  8. Rzlial
  9. Alˁuzi
  10. Kšpial
  11. Bbr
  12. Pnial
  13. Sziṭ
  14. Mgr
  15. Srms
  16. Mḥlial
  17. Asrpal
  18. Nspi
  19. ˁurhm
  20. Ikb
  21. ˁlp
  22. Nbnrubal
  23. Sisial
  24. Ṭbual
  25. Drial
  26. Surial
  27. Srial
  28. Pliqus
9. Kislew:
  1. Arubial
  2. Drial
  3. Mruk
  4. Rhbr
  5. ˁuzi
  6. Mrial
  7. Dsri
  8. Mnrial
  9. Qumial
  10. Šurial
  11. Qrial
  12. Hušˁih
  13. Sgbul
  14. Mrgial
  15. Bkria
  16. Argial
  17. ˁtial
  18. Psnumi
  19. Plṣua
  20. Isurial
  21. Uqrmnial
  22. Arq
  23. Ḥmrigal
  24. Glial
  25. Gbnw
  26. Skial
  27. Alˁsi
  28. Buqi
  29. Lugial
10. Ṭevet:
  1. ˁnal
  2. ˁmial
  3. Arusmk
  4. Nplia
  5. Rˁmiš
  6. Dhnial
  7. Ptual
  8. Aḥun
  9. Grmsur
  10. ˁsuqi
  11. Nšpua
  12. Ngri
  13. Šti
  14. Ḥza
  15. Ssgpun
  16. Gzrzip
  17. Akzmi
  18. Nuk
  19. Ptupnm
  20. Srgmup
  21. Aliab
  22. Srual
  23. Sgnual
  24. Rzzial
  25. Snuna
  26. Lulbn
  27. Srms
  28. Mlukn
  29. Apusp
  30. Mrimut
11. Shevaṭ:
  1. Gbnual
  2. Išral
  3. Nutial
  4. Gzrial
  5. Nssm
  6. Abrizp
  7. Spal
  8. Brsu
  9. Pˁal
  10. Irual
  11. Zmual
  12. Mual
  13. Tlial
  14. Nuri'el
  15. Ssnal
  16. Srpia
  17. Ṣmiral
  18. Brial
  19. Bbiaur
  20. Špṭu
  21. Ṣḥin
  22. Nplial
  23. Rzpial
  24. Tlm
  25. Lbrqial
  26. Dldlual
  27. Brrial
  28. Stiap
  29. Mšial
12. Adar:
  1. Rumial
  2. Brrial
  3. Akikal
  4. Mlšial
  5. Šmial
  6. Srial
  7. Asrial
  8. Pˁmial
  9. Ḥdšial
  10. Al
  11. Hmlk
  12. Prḥih
  13. Ihal
  14. Iuhal
  15. Gavri'el
  16. ˁmlial
  17. Grial
  18. Rˁial
  19. Rafa'el
  20. Ḥsdial
  21. Sprial
  22. Šlumial
  23. Irˁial

=== 6th Heaven ===
Below are the angels who serve in the west and east. Each of the princes is served by about 30 angels.

1. West, led by Aparkm:
  1. Ziutn
  2. Skmial
  3. Brhal
  4. Ašrial
  5. Bigal
  6. Gzqial
  7. Gdˁih
  8. Nuri'el
  9. Mštial
  10. Hnial
  11. Aurpnial
  12. Mqurimi
  13. Musial
  14. Drhial
  15. Rmal
  16. Akzan
  17. Šir
  18. Aium
  19. Brḥial
  20. Bḥluk
  21. Sipdial
  22. Širdṭn
  23. Rububi
  24. Iair
  25. Atlial
  26. Tmpnuḥ
  27. Nhḥmial
  28. Alprnin
  29. Amhial
  30. Tmnhdr
2. East, led by Tuqpirs:
  1. Mlmual
  2. Ṣrmial
  3. Ngḥal
  4. Aqrial
  5. Qštial
  6. Abrbdial
  7. Šrrial
  8. Smpial
  9. Armasi
  10. Dirial
  11. Srial
  12. Anbrial
  13. Ṭplial
  14. Hdrmial
  15. Gnušial
  16. Mnhrial
  17. Mhṭral
  18. Uapšrial
  19. Qlˁial
  20. Hzirnial
  21. Dlrial
  22. Šˁltial
  23. Dglial
  24. ˁrnnial
  25. Ṭhrial
  26. Kbrial
  27. Hmkual
  28. Alhnial
  29. Ṭubial

== See also ==
- Lists of angels
- List of angels in theology
- List of spirits appearing in grimoires
- List of angels in Ars Paulina
- Angels in Judaism
- Uthra
