= List of spirits appearing in grimoires =

Grimoires are fundamentally books that will supposedly grant their users magical powers, which date back to ancient times. In several of these books, rituals designed to help summon spirits are found. The following table lists spirits, including angels and demons, whose names show up in these grimoires for invocative ritual purposes. The list does not include all Enochian angels.

== List ==
Name	Grimoire(s) mentioned	Type of spirit
Aamon	Lesser Key of Solomon	Demon
Abael	Magical Treatise of Solomon	Angel
Abaeli	Magical Treatise of Solomon	Angel
Abaoth	Greek Magical Papyri	Deity
Abrasax	Greek Magical Papyri	Deity
Abrikhos	Magical Treatise of Solomon	Demon
Adonai	Greek Magical Papyri	Deity
Agares	Lesser Key of Solomon, Liber Officiorum Spirituum	Demon
Agathoel	Magical Treatise of Solomon	Archangel
Ageel	Magical Treatise of Solomon	Angel
Aim	Lesser Key of Solomon	Demon
Akael	Magical Treatise of Solomon	Angel
Akhlyton	Magical Treatise of Solomon	Demon
Akrokh	Magical Treatise of Solomon	Demon
Akynakiel	Magical Treatise of Solomon	Angel
Alidapor	Magical Treatise of Solomon	Demon
Allocer	Lesser Key of Solomon, Liber Officiorum Spirituum	Demon
Amaymon	Pseudomonarchia Daemonum	Demon
Ambael	Magical Treatise of Solomon	Angel
Amekh	Magical Treatise of Solomon	Demon
Amdusias	Lesser Key of Solomon	Demon
Amor	Magical Treatise of Solomon	Demon
Amphiel	Magical Treatise of Solomon	Angel
Amphou	Magical Treatise of Solomon	Demon
Amy	Lesser Key of Solomon	Demon
Andras	Lesser Key of Solomon	Demon
Andrealphus	Lesser Key of Solomon	Demon
Andromalius	Lesser Key of Solomon	Demon
Androphag	Magical Treatise of Solomon	Demon
Androphages	Magical Treatise of Solomon	Demon
Aphios	Magical Treatise of Solomon	Demon
Apios	Magical Treatise of Solomon	Demon
Aphrodite	Greek Magical Papyri	Deity
Aprax	Magical Treatise of Solomon	Demon
Aprixon	Magical Treatise of Solomon	Demon
Aratron	Arbatel de magia veterum	Olympian spirit
Arael	Magical Treatise of Solomon	Angel
Araps	Magical Treatise of Solomon	Demon
Arax	Magical Treatise of Solomon	Demon
Aritan	Magical Treatise of Solomon	Demon
Arban	Magical Treatise of Solomon	Demon
Ariel	Magical Treatise of Solomon	Angel
Arkael	Magical Treatise of Solomon	Angel
Armatel	Magical Treatise of Solomon	Angel
Armoel	Magical Treatise of Solomon	Angel
Arniel	Magical Treatise of Solomon	Angel
Artidos	Magical Treatise of Solomon	Demon
Askyros	Magical Treatise of Solomon	Demon
Asmodeus	Lesser Key of Solomon, Liber Officiorum Spirituum	Demon
Asprael	Magical Treatise of Solomon	Angel
Astaroth	Lesser Key of Solomon, Liber Officiorum Spirituum	Demon
Azaboul	Magical Treatise of Solomon	Demon
Azan	Magical Treatise of Solomon	Demon
Bael	Lesser Key of Solomon, Liber Officiorum Spirituum	Demon
Balam	Lesser Key of Solomon	Demon
Banael	Magical Treatise of Solomon	Angel
Barbas	Lesser Key of Solomon	Demon
Barbatos	Lesser Key of Solomon, Liber Officiorum Spirituum	Demon
Bathin	Lesser Key of Solomon	Demon
Bediel	Magical Treatise of Solomon	Angel
Beleth	Lesser Key of Solomon	Demon
Belial	Lesser Key of Solomon, Liber Officiorum Spirituum	Demon
Berael	Magical Treatise of Solomon	Angel
Berith	Lesser Key of Solomon, Liber Officiorum Spirituum	Demon
Betaniel	Magical Treatise of Solomon	Angel
Bethor	Arbatel de magia veterum	Olympian spirit
Biel	Magical Treatise of Solomon	Angel
Bifrons	Lesser Key of Solomon	Demon
Bilgall	Liber Officiorum Spirituum	Fairy
Bizike	Magical Treatise of Solomon	Demon
Botis	Lesser Key of Solomon	Demon
Bradiel	Magical Treatise of Solomon	Angel
Buer	Lesser Key of Solomon	Demon
Bune	Lesser Key of Solomon	Demon
Camio	Lesser Key of Solomon	Demon
Chabra	Greek Magical Papyri	Deity
Dalphos	Magical Treatise of Solomon	Angel
Deankon	Magical Treatise of Solomon	Angel
Decarabia	Lesser Key of Solomon	Demon
Demakhth	Magical Treatise of Solomon	Demon
Drael	Magical Treatise of Solomon	Angel
Ediel	Magical Treatise of Solomon	Angel
Ekhleton	Magical Treatise of Solomon	Demon
Eliasem	Magical Treatise of Solomon	Demon
Eligos	Lesser Key of Solomon	Demon
Emphoinoel	Magical Treatise of Solomon	Angel
Enikym	Magical Treatise of Solomon	Demon
Entauros	Magical Treatise of Solomon	Demon
Eniran	Magical Treatise of Solomon	Demon
Epheielas	Magical Treatise of Solomon	Demon
Ephryx	Magical Treatise of Solomon	Demon
Epie	Magical Treatise of Solomon	Demon
Esmael	Magical Treatise of Solomon	Angel
Ergatge	Magical Treatise of Solomon	Demon
Ergatos	Magical Treatise of Solomon	Demon
Ermager	Magical Treatise of Solomon	Demon
Flauros	Lesser Key of Solomon	Demon
Focalor	Lesser Key of Solomon	Demon
Foras	Lesser Key of Solomon	Demon
Forneus	Lesser Key of Solomon	Demon
Furcas	Lesser Key of Solomon	Demon
Furfur	Lesser Key of Solomon	Demon
Gaap	Lesser Key of Solomon	Demon
Gabriel	Magical Treatise of Solomon, Greek Magical Papyri	Archangel/deity
Galgidon	Magical Treatise of Solomon	Demon
Galielior	Magical Treatise of Solomon	Demon
Gamigin	Lesser Key of Solomon	Demon
Ganten	Magical Treatise of Solomon	Angel
Garastri	Magical Treatise of Solomon	Demon
Gatazar	Magical Treatise of Solomon	Demon
Genekiel	Magical Treatise of Solomon	Angel
Geran	Magical Treatise of Solomon	Demon
Germielel	Magical Treatise of Solomon	Angel
Gesteel	Magical Treatise of Solomon	Angel
Gigkorgi	Magical Treatise of Solomon	Demon
Gilbiel	Magical Treatise of Solomon	Angel
Glasya-Labolas	Lesser Key of Solomon	Demon
Glikidol	Magical Treatise of Solomon	Angel
Glotas	Magical Treatise of Solomon	Angel
Gnathael	Magical Treatise of Solomon	Angel
Gnontas	Magical Treatise of Solomon	Demon
Gob	Magical Treatise of Solomon	Angel
Gokom	Magical Treatise of Solomon	Demon
Golgiel	Magical Treatise of Solomon	Angel
Gorgiel	Magical Treatise of Solomon	Angel
Goulion	Magical Treatise of Solomon	Demon
Gremory	Lesser Key of Solomon	Demon
Gusion	Lesser Key of Solomon	Demon
Gyran	Magical Treatise of Solomon	Demon
Haagenti	Lesser Key of Solomon	Demon
Hagith	Arbatel de magia veterum	Olympian spirit
Hariel	Lesser Key of Solomon	Angel
Homitoton	Magical Treatise of Solomon	Demon
Hotrikhos	Magical Treatise of Solomon	Demon
Iamoel	Magical Treatise of Solomon	Angel
Ianouel	Magical Treatise of Solomon	Angel
Ioa	Greek Magical Papyri	Deity
Ioel	Magical Treatise of Solomon	Angel
Ionel	Magical Treatise of Solomon	Angel
Iokhth	Magical Treatise of Solomon	Angel
Iorael	Magical Treatise of Solomon	Angel
Ioran	Magical Treatise of Solomon	Angel
Ipos	Lesser Key of Solomon	Demon
Ispnyrix	Magical Treatise of Solomon	Demon
Itadadiph	Magical Treatise of Solomon	Demon
Ioukhan	Magical Treatise of Solomon	Demon
Kakloudalos	Magical Treatise of Solomon	Demon
Kalbageel	Magical Treatise of Solomon	Angel
Kaleel	Magical Treatise of Solomon	Angel
Kanianel	Magical Treatise of Solomon	Angel
Kaniel	Magical Treatise of Solomon	Angel
Kantziel	Magical Treatise of Solomon	Angel
Kapnithel	Magical Treatise of Solomon	Demon
Kaponiel	Magical Treatise of Solomon	Angel
Karatan	Magical Treatise of Solomon	Demon
Karipher	Magical Treatise of Solomon	Angel
Karsael	Magical Treatise of Solomon	Angel
Kasiopptos	Magical Treatise of Solomon	Demon
Kastrike	Magical Treatise of Solomon	Angel
Kedoel	Magical Treatise of Solomon	Angel
Keriae	Magical Treatise of Solomon	Demon
Khalkidon	Magical Treatise of Solomon	Angel
Kheiron	Magical Treatise of Solomon	Demon
Khimer	Magical Treatise of Solomon	Demon
Kiknyt	Magical Treatise of Solomon	Demon
Kismosan	Magical Treatise of Solomon	Angel
Kinpharaph	Magical Treatise of Solomon	Angel
Kispoel	Magical Treatise of Solomon	Angel
Kipol	Magical Treatise of Solomon	Angel
Kipos	Magical Treatise of Solomon	Demon
Khalkikhel	Magical Treatise of Solomon	Angel
Khartisiel	Magical Treatise of Solomon	Angel
Kheriel	Magical Treatise of Solomon	Angel
Khimeriel	Magical Treatise of Solomon	Angel
Klinoel	Magical Treatise of Solomon	Angel
Kniphor	Magical Treatise of Solomon	Demon
Kolkil	Magical Treatise of Solomon	Angel
Kopel	Magical Treatise of Solomon	Angel
Kopenos	Magical Treatise of Solomon	Demon
Koudrael	Magical Treatise of Solomon	Angel
Koudrouel	Magical Treatise of Solomon	Angel
Koupeel	Magical Treatise of Solomon	Angel
Kourtael	Magical Treatise of Solomon	Angel
Krotiel	Magical Treatise of Solomon	Angel
Kybael	Magical Treatise of Solomon	Angel
Kylikos	Magical Treatise of Solomon	Demon
Kynops	Magical Treatise of Solomon	Demon
Kyntogyr	Magical Treatise of Solomon	Demon
kyphthonios	Magical Treatise of Solomon	Demon
Laleel	Magical Treatise of Solomon	Angel
Lastor	Magical Treatise of Solomon	Demon
Lemoth	Magical Treatise of Solomon	Demon
Leraje	Lesser Key of Solomon	Demon
Likoniel	Magical Treatise of Solomon	Angel
Ligoro	Magical Treatise of Solomon	Demon
Loginar	Magical Treatise of Solomon	Demon
Loukan	Magical Treatise of Solomon	Demon
Loutzipher	Magical Treatise of Solomon	Demon
Lucifer	Grimoirium Verum	Fallen Angel
Lucifuge Rofocale	Grand Grimoire: The Red Dragon	Demon
Lyrik	Magical Treatise of Solomon	Demon
Lysiel	Magical Treatise of Solomon	Angel
Magras	Magical Treatise of Solomon	Demon
Makhmithe	Magical Treatise of Solomon	Demon
Malakes	Magical Treatise of Solomon	Demon
Malphas	Lesser Key of Solomon	Demon
Malthus	Lesser Key of Solomon	Demon
Mamon	Magical Treatise of Solomon	Demon
Manael	Magical Treatise of Solomon	Demon
Manikos	Magical Treatise of Solomon	Demon
Marchosias	Lesser Key of Solomon	Demon
Mariphonou	Magical Treatise of Solomon	Demon
Marniel	Magical Treatise of Solomon	Angel
Moroel	Magical Treatise of Solomon	Angel
Meltphron	Magical Treatise of Solomon	Demon
Merkim	Magical Treatise of Solomon	Demon
Mesnikhael	Magical Treatise of Solomon	Angel
Mesoel	Magical Treatise of Solomon	Angel
Metabiel	Magical Treatise of Solomon	Angel
Michael	Magical Treatise of Solomon, Greek Magical Papyri	Archangel/deity
Midomet	Magical Treatise of Solomon	Demon
Miel	Magical Treatise of Solomon	Angel
Miobiou	Magical Treatise of Solomon	Demon
Mithniel	Magical Treatise of Solomon	Angel
Mnimeoel	Magical Treatise of Solomon	Angel
Moli	Magical Treatise of Solomon	Demon
Moria	Magical Treatise of Solomon	Demon
Mourkeel	Magical Treatise of Solomon	Angel
Murmur	Lesser Key of Solomon	Demon
Mycob	Liber Officiorum Spirituum	Fairy
Mykhridam	Magical Treatise of Solomon	Demon
Mynael	Magical Treatise of Solomon	Angel
Naberius	Lesser Key of Solomon	Demon
Nakhoel	Magical Treatise of Solomon	Angel
Nakistos	Magical Treatise of Solomon	Demon
Natoel	Magical Treatise of Solomon	Angel
Nemaktinos	Magical Treatise of Solomon	Demon
Neseliel	Magical Treatise of Solomon	Angel
Nestibe	Magical Treatise of Solomon	Demon
Nidouel	Magical Treatise of Solomon	Angel
Nierier	Magical Treatise of Solomon	Demon
Nigrieph	Magical Treatise of Solomon	Demon
Niktidon	Magical Treatise of Solomon	Demon
Niran	Magical Treatise of Solomon	Demon
Nitriaphri	Magical Treatise of Solomon	Demon
Nyphon	Magical Treatise of Solomon	Demon
Oberon	Liber Officiorum Spirituum, Book of Oberon	Fairy
Och	Arbatel de magia veterum	Olympian spirit
Oenael	Magical Treatise of Solomon	Angel
Oketar	Magical Treatise of Solomon	Demon
Okhlos	Magical Treatise of Solomon	Demon
Okokes	Magical Treatise of Solomon	Demon
Omeel	Magical Treatise of Solomon	Angel
Omniel	Magical Treatise of Solomon	Angel
Oneros	Magical Treatise of Solomon	Demon
Onistros	Magical Treatise of Solomon	Demon
Onokh	Magical Treatise of Solomon	Demon
Ontokhor	Magical Treatise of Solomon	Demon
Ophiael	Magical Treatise of Solomon	Angel
Ophiel	Arbatel de magia veterum	Olympian spirit
Ophtiel	Magical Treatise of Solomon	Angel
Opnax	Magical Treatise of Solomon	Demon
Opseel	Magical Treatise of Solomon	Angel
Oreater	Magical Treatise of Solomon	Angel
Organ	Magical Treatise of Solomon	Demon
Orias	Lesser Key of Solomon	Demon
Oriniel	Magical Treatise of Solomon	Angel
Orkhat	Magical Treatise of Solomon	Demon
Orkiel	Magical Treatise of Solomon	Angel
Orkitaeph	Magical Treatise of Solomon	Demon
Orobas	Lesser Key of Solomon	Demon
Orphitan	Magical Treatise of Solomon	Demon
Orphor	Magical Treatise of Solomon	Demon
Orpsan	Magical Treatise of Solomon	Demon
Ose	Lesser Key of Solomon, Liber Officiorum Spirituum	Demon
Osmie	Magical Treatise of Solomon	Demon
Orthrdile	Magical Treatise of Solomon	Demon
Ouanleilos	Magical Treatise of Solomon	Demon
Oukisem	Magical Treatise of Solomon	Demon
Ouktak	Magical Treatise of Solomon	Demon
Ouloudias	Magical Treatise of Solomon	Angel
Ouriel	Magical Treatise of Solomon	Archangel
Outanon	Magical Treatise of Solomon	Angel
Ouxynouel	Magical Treatise of Solomon	Angel
Padouel	Magical Treatise of Solomon	Angel
Paimon	Lesser Key of Solomon	Demon
Pantoel	Magical Treatise of Solomon	Angel
Paraniel	Magical Treatise of Solomon	Angel
Parapiel	Magical Treatise of Solomon	Angel
Partan	Magical Treatise of Solomon	Angel
Patiel	Magical Treatise of Solomon	Angel
Pel	Magical Treatise of Solomon	Angel
Pelaphiel	Magical Treatise of Solomon	Angel
Peleki	Magical Treatise of Solomon	Angel
Peliel	Magical Treatise of Solomon	Angel
Pelor	Magical Treatise of Solomon	Demon
Pelouel	Magical Treatise of Solomon	Angel
Pinopygos	Magical Treatise of Solomon	Demon
Piphathi	Magical Treatise of Solomon	Demon
Pisel	Magical Treatise of Solomon	Angel
Perganael	Magical Treatise of Solomon	Angel
Phaleg	Arbatel de magia veterum	Olympian spirit
Phaloaniphe	Magical Treatise of Solomon	Demon
Phaphot	Magical Treatise of Solomon	Demon
Pharos	Magical Treatise of Solomon	Demon
Pharsael	Magical Treatise of Solomon	Angel
Phenex	Lesser Key of Solomon	Demon
Pherpheriel	Magical Treatise of Solomon	Angel
Phisiel	Magical Treatise of Solomon	Angel
Phiniditas	Magical Treatise of Solomon	Demon
Phnidor	Magical Treatise of Solomon	Demon
Phrodenos	Magical Treatise of Solomon	Demon
Phul	Arbatel de magia veterum	Olympian spirit
Pizitor	Magical Treatise of Solomon	Demon
Plenanix	Magical Treatise of Solomon	Angel
Plyx	Magical Treatise of Solomon	Demon
Pnyx	Magical Treatise of Solomon	Demon
Polion	Magical Treatise of Solomon	Angel
Preniphel	Magical Treatise of Solomon	Angel
Prophoe	Magical Treatise of Solomon	Demon
Prosiel	Magical Treatise of Solomon	Angel
Psalketios	Magical Treatise of Solomon	Angel
Ptelaton	Magical Treatise of Solomon	Demon
Purson	Lesser Key of Solomon	Demon
Pyrotoro	Magical Treatise of Solomon	Demon
Raphael	Magical Treatise of Solomon, Greek Magical Papyri	Archangel/deity
Raum	Lesser Key of Solomon	Demon
Rhakhael	Magical Treatise of Solomon	Angel
Rhamael	Magical Treatise of Solomon	Angel
Rhamatiel	Magical Treatise of Solomon	Angel
Rhaphael	Magical Treatise of Solomon	Angel
Retael	Magical Treatise of Solomon	Angel
Rhitzioel	Magical Treatise of Solomon	Angel
Rhoustat	Magical Treatise of Solomon	Demon
Sabnock	Lesser Key of Solomon	Demon
Sakatiel	Magical Treatise of Solomon	Archangel
Salael	Magical Treatise of Solomon	Angel
Saleos	Lesser Key of Solomon	Demon
Saloel	Magical Treatise of Solomon	Angel
Saltiel	Magical Treatise of Solomon	Angel
Samael	Magical Treatise of Solomon	Archangel
Santael	Magical Treatise of Solomon	Angel
Satan	Liber Officiorum Spirituum	Fallen angel
Satanachia	Grand Grimoire: The Red Dragon	Demon
Sanypiel	Magical Treatise of Solomon	Angel
Sarpidie	Magical Treatise of Solomon	Demon
Selpiou	Magical Treatise of Solomon	Angel
Seir	Lesser Key of Solomon	Demon
Shax	Lesser Key of Solomon	Demon
Sielkin	Magical Treatise of Solomon	Angel
Silidon	Magical Treatise of Solomon	Demon
Simoel	Magical Treatise of Solomon	Angel
Sinael	Magical Treatise of Solomon	Angel
Singyrom	Magical Treatise of Solomon	Demon
Sirtor	Magical Treatise of Solomon	Demon
Sithlos	Magical Treatise of Solomon	Demon
Sitoel	Magical Treatise of Solomon	Angel
Sitri	Lesser Key of Solomon	Demon
Sitros	Magical Treatise of Solomon	Demon
Skar	Magical Treatise of Solomon	Demon
Skytomiel	Magical Treatise of Solomon	Angel
Souriel	Greek Magical Papyri	Deity
Sphiknoel	Magical Treatise of Solomon	Angel
Spyldar	Magical Treatise of Solomon	Demon
Stanthyros	Magical Treatise of Solomon	Demon
Stelpha	Magical Treatise of Solomon	Demon
Stolas	Lesser Key of Solomon	Demon
Stragiel	Magical Treatise of Solomon	Angel
Stragiton	Magical Treatise of Solomon	Demon
Stouphouel	Magical Treatise of Solomon	Angel
Styroel	Magical Treatise of Solomon	Angel
Takhman	Magical Treatise of Solomon	Demon
Taklas	Magical Treatise of Solomon	Demon
Tantales	Magical Treatise of Solomon	Demon
Tariel	Magical Treatise of Solomon	Angel
Taritael	Magical Treatise of Solomon	Demon
Taxeponi	Magical Treatise of Solomon	Demon
Teikhir	Magical Treatise of Solomon	Demon
Tekharyx	Magical Treatise of Solomon	Angel
Tektonoel	Magical Treatise of Solomon	Angel
Terael	Magical Treatise of Solomon	Angel
Tetilot	Magical Treatise of Solomon	Angel
Tetriel	Magical Treatise of Solomon	Angel
Thamniel	Magical Treatise of Solomon	Angel
Thapnyx	Magical Treatise of Solomon	Demon
Thebael	Magical Treatise of Solomon	Angel
Todede	Magical Treatise of Solomon	Demon
Toratoel	Magical Treatise of Solomon	Angel
Trapidon	Magical Treatise of Solomon	Angel
Typhonbon	Magical Treatise of Solomon	Demon
Tyroel	Magical Treatise of Solomon	Angel
Tzepater	Magical Treatise of Solomon	Demon
Valac	Lesser Key of Solomon	Demon
Valefar	Lesser Key of Solomon	Demon
Vapula	Lesser Key of Solomon	Demon
Vassago	Lesser Key of Solomon, Liber Officiorum Spirituum	Demon
Vepar	Lesser Key of Solomon	Demon
Vine	Lesser Key of Solomon	Demon
Vual	Lesser Key of Solomon	Demon
Zepar	Lesser Key of Solomon	Demon
Zagan	Lesser Key of Solomon	Demon
Zaphan	Magical Treatise of Solomon	Demon
Zorzori	Magical Treatise of Solomon	Demon

== See also ==
- List of angels in theology
- List of theological demons
- List of angels in Ars Paulina
- List of angels in Sefer HaRazim
