= Olympian spirits =

Spirits appearing in magical books

Olympian spirits (or Olympic spirits, Olympick spirits) refers to seven spirits mentioned in several Renaissance and post-Renaissance books of ritual magic/ceremonial magic, such as the Arbatel de magia veterum, The Secret Grimoire of Turiel and The Complete Book of Magic Science. The Arbatel of Magick says of the Olympian spirits: "They are called Olympick spirits, which do inhabit in the firmament, and in the stars of the firmament: and the office of these spirits is to declare Destinies, and to administer fatal Charms, so far forth as God pleaseth to permit them."

In this magic system, the universe is divided into 196 provinces (a number which in numerology adds up to 7: 1+9+6=16; 1+6=7) with each of the seven Olympian spirits ruling a set number of provinces. Aratron rules the most provinces (49), while each succeeding Olympian rules seven fewer than the former, down to Phul who rules seven provinces. Each of the Olympic spirits rules alternately for 490 years. Each Olympian spirit is also associated with one of the seven luminaries which figure in ancient and medieval Western magic.

== The seven Olympian spirits ==
1. Aratron (or Arathron), "the alchemist who commanded seventeen million six hundred and forty thousand spirits". He rules 49 provinces. His planet is Saturn.
  Seal of Aratron
  ARATRON governs those things which are ascribed astrologically to Saturn. He can convert any living organism, plant or animal into stone, and that in a moment of time; he can also change coals into treasure and treasure into coals; he gives familiars and reconciles subterranean spirits to men; he teaches Alchemy, Magic and Medicine, imparts the secret of invisibility, makes the barren fruitful and, lastly, confers long life.
  — Arthur Edward Waite, Book of Ceremonial Magic
2. Bethor, "who commanded twenty-nine thousand legions of spirits". He rules 42 provinces. His planet is Jupiter.
  Seal of Bethor
  The affairs of Jupiter are administered by BETHOR, who responds quickly when called. The person dignified by his character may be exalted to illustrious positions and may obtain large treasures. He reconciles the Spirits of the Air to man, so that they will give true answers, transport precious stones and compose medicines having miraculous effects. BETHOR also grants familiars of the firmament, and can prolong life to seven hundred years, subject to the will of God, which qualification imparts an air of caution.
  — Arthur Edward Waite, Book of Ceremonial Magic
3. Phaleg (or Phalec, Pharos), "the War-Lord". His planet is Mars. He rules 35 provinces.
  Seal of Phaleg
  PHALEG governs the things that are attributed to Mars. The person who possesses his character is raised by him to great honour in military affairs.
  — Arthur Edward Waite, Book of Ceremonial Magic
4. Och, "the alchemist, physician, and magician". He rules 28 provinces. His "planet" is the Sun.
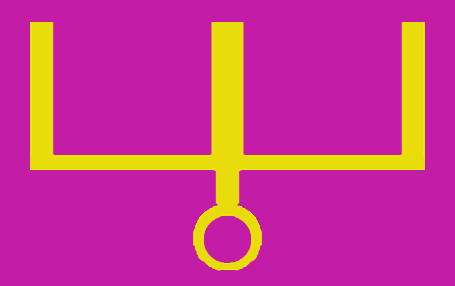
  Seal of Och
  Solar interests are administered by OCH, who prolongs life to six hundred years, with perfect health therein. He imparts great wisdom, gives excellent (familiar) spirits, composes perfect medicines, converts any substance into the purest of metals, or into precious stones; he also bestows gold and a purse, quaintly described by the English translator of the Arbatel as "springing with gold." He causes the possessor of his character to be worshipped as a god by the kings of the whole world.
  — Arthur Edward Waite, Book of Ceremonial Magic
5. Hagith, "transmuter of metals, and commander of four thousand legions of spirits". He rules 21 provinces. His planet is Venus.
  Seal of Hagith
  The government of Venereal concerns is entrusted to HAGITH, and the person possessing his character is adorned with all beauty. He converts copper into gold in a moment and gold instantaneously into copper; he also gives faithful serving spirits.
  — Arthur Edward Waite, Book of Ceremonial Magic
6. Ophiel, "who commanded one hundred thousand legions of spirits". He rules 14 provinces. His planet is Mercury.
  Seal of Ophiel
  OPHIEL is the ruler of those things which are attributed to Mercury; he gives familiar spirits, teaches all arts, and enables the possessor of his character to change quicksilver immediately into the Philosopher's Stone.
  — Arthur Edward Waite, Book of Ceremonial Magic
7. Phul, "lord of the powers of the moon and supreme lord of the waters". He rules 7 provinces. His "planet" is the Moon.
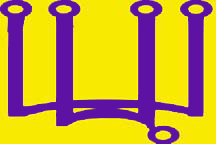
  Seal of Phul
  Lunary concerns are under the government of PHUL, who truly transmutes all metals into silver, heals dropsy and provides Spirits of the Water, who serve men in a corporal [sic] and visible form; he also prolongs life to three hundred years.
  — Arthur Edward Waite, Book of Ceremonial Magic

== The seven archangels and the seven Olympian spirits ==
In ritual magic, the seven Olympian spirits are not confused with the seven traditional archangels, which usually are Michael (usually the Sun), Anael (Venus), Raphael (usually Mercury), Gabriel (the Moon), Cassiel (Saturn), Samael (Mars) and Zadkiel (Jupiter), or a variation thereof.

The seven Olympian spirits are often evoked in conjunction with the seven classic archangels, and magic seals often associate one of the classic seven with one of the Olympian spirits. For example, a magic seal from Frederick Hockley's The Complete Book of Magic Science shows the form of a seal which binds a spirit of Jupiter, Pabiel, to the magician: Pabiel's name appears in a band stretched between two circles: the circle on the left bearing the name and sigil of Bethor, the circle on the right bearing the name and sigil of Sachiel (equivalent to Zadkiel).

== See also ==
- Hierarchy of angels
- Seven Archangels
- Twelve Olympians
