= Lists of demons =

The following are lists of demons:

- List of theological demons, a list of demons that appear in religion, theology, demonology, mythology, and folklore
  - List of spirits appearing in grimoires, listing spirits, including demons, whose names show up in these grimoires for evocation ritual purposes
    - List of demons in the Ars Goetia, the demons' names are taken from the goetic grimoire Ars Goetia
    - List of sigils of demons, listing pictorial signatures attributed to demons
- List of demons in fiction, a list of notable demons that appear in works of fiction
  - List of films about demons, a list of films where demons appear

== See also ==
- Lists of angels
