= Turiel =

Fallen angel in the Book of Enoch

Turiel (or Tûrêl; Imperial Aramaic: טוריאל; Ancient Greek: Τουριήλ) is a fallen Watcher in the ancient apocryphal text known as the Book of Enoch. In later translations, he is one of the 20 leaders of 200 fallen angels, mentioned eighteenth. The name is believed to originate from tuwr "rock" and El "God", meaning "rock of God", while the translation taken from M. A. Knibb's work on the Ethiopic Book of Enoch is either "Mountain of God" or "Rock of God".

== The Secret Grimoire of Turiel ==
There is a grimoire called The Secret Grimoire of Turiel in which the magician is given instructions on how to contact Turiel. It claims to have been written in about 1518, and that it may have been copied from something older. According to the original publisher, the work was found by Marius Malchus in 1927 after buying an English translation of a now-lost Latin original from a defrocked priest, which he copied before discarding. No references to the work have appeared anywhere before 1960, when the work was originally published, and the story of the defrocked priest and lost manuscript is fiction meant to cover up why the author could not produce any copies older than the twentieth century. The work plagiarizes and re-hashes material from A. E. Waite's 1898 work The Book of Black Magic and of Pacts (particularly his translation of Arbatel de magia veterum) and Samuel Liddell MacGregor Mathers's introduction to the 1888 edition of The Key of Solomon the King. It is ultimately related to (if not based on) a mid-nineteenth-century manuscript by Frederick Hockley titled The Complete Book of Magic Science, of which multiple copies existed in different libraries.

== See also ==
- List of angels in theology
