= Arbatel de magia veterum =

Grimoire of ceremonial magic published in 1575

The Arbatel De Magia Veterum (English: Arbatel: On the Magic of the Ancients) is a Latin grimoire of Renaissance ceremonial magic published in 1575 in Switzerland.

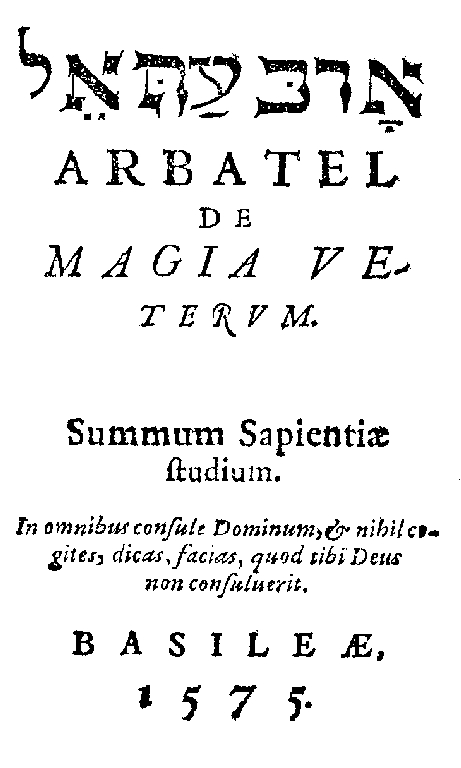
Title page of the Arbatel De Magia Veterum

== Title ==
A. E. Waite assumes that the title is from the Hebrew: ארבעתאל (or Arbotal) as the name of an angel the author would have claimed to have learned magic from.

Adolf Jacoby believed the name to be a reference to the Tetragrammaton, via the Hebrew ARBOThIM (fourfold) and AL (or God).

Peterson, mentioning the above possibilities, also suggests that the title might be the author's pseudonym.

== Origin ==
The Arbatel is noted for being straightforward in its writing, positive in its contents, and unusually honest regarding its origins. While a number of occult works claim to be from earlier periods and other regions than where they were actually published, textual evidence demonstrates that the book must have been written between 1536 and 1583, which encompasses the claimed date of 1575. The final editing of the book was likely carried out by Theodor Zwinger, and was almost definitely published by Pietro Perna, leaving little doubt to the book's claimed Swiss origin. The author remains unknown, but Peterson believes one Jacques Gohory (1520–1576) to be the most likely possibility. Gohory, like Zwinger and Perna, was a Paracelsian.

Some German manuscripts produced shortly after its publication attribute the work to Paracelsus, though without evidence.

== Nature ==
The Arbatel mainly focuses on the relationship between humanity, celestial hierarchies, and the positive relationship between the two. The Olympian spirits featured in it are entirely original.

A. E. Waite, quite clear of the Christian nature of the work (if dissatisfied with its ideas of practical magic), writes that the book is devoid of black magic and without any connection to the Greater or Lesser Keys of Solomon. Unlike other grimoires, the Arbatel exhorts the magus to remain active in their community (instead of isolating themselves), favoring kindness, charity, and honesty over remote and obscure rituals.

The Bible is the source most often quoted and referred to throughout the work (indeed, the author appears to have almost memorized large portions of it, resulting in paraphrases differing from the Vulgate). The Arbatel cannot be understood if separated from the philosophy of Paracelsus, who appears to have coined the term "Olympic spirits", and was the inspiration for the Arbatel's understanding of elementals (including Paracelsus's gnomes and the uniquely Paracelsian "Sagani"), the macrocosm and microcosm, and experimentation combined with respect for ancient authorities. Indeed, the Arbatel is both broadly and deeply rooted in classical culture, including Ancient Greek philosophy, the Sibylline oracles and Plotinus, in addition to the contemporaneous theology and occult philosophy of figures such as Iovianus Pontanus and Johannes Trithemius. (All of these traits also feature in the works of Jacques Gohory, which Peterson claims as evidence for his theory of Gohory's authorship.)

== Reception and influence ==
The Arbatel was one of the most influential works of its kind from its period, inspiring figures such as Johann Arndt, Gerhard Dorn, Adam Haslmayr, Robert Fludd, Heinrich Khunrath and Valentin Weigel, in addition to its editor and publisher, Zwinger and Perna. It was possibly the first work to use "Theosophy" in an occult sense (as opposed to a synonym for theology), and for distinguishing between human ("anthroposophia") and divine knowledge ("theosophia"). Indeed, Jakob Böhme may have chosen the word "Theosophy" to describe his ideas due to its use in the Arbatel. It was where Thomas Vaughan found the term anthroposophy, later adopted by Rudolf Steiner to describe his belief system. Not all reception was positive, however. The book was condemned by Johann Weyer in his De praestigiis daemonum as being "full of magical impiety", and by Reformed Church censor Simon Sulzer. In 1617, the University of Marburg took action against two professors who intended to use the grimoire as a textbook, and expelled a student obsessed with it. In 1623, an accused witch named Jean Michel Menuisier revealed that, despite not owning a copy of the Arbatel, he used a few invocations from it.

John Dee wrote about studying the Arbatel (among many other occult works of the period). This influence has led Nicholas Clulee to posit that Dee did not see his angelic experiments as magical, but in fact religious, as both Dee's ceremonies and the magical system of the Arbatel begin with prayers to God that cautiously lead into requests to see heavenly angels. Dee also recorded calling upon at least the Arbatel's solar Olympian spirit Och. Swedish mystic Johannes Bureus credited the work for his interest in Kabbalah.

Elements of the Arbatel appear in a number of versions of the Sixth and Seventh Books of Moses. Ebenezer Sibly and Frederick Hockley incorporated a number of elements from Robert Turner's translation of the Arbatel into their own magical works, including The Clavic or Key to the Magic of Solomon and The Complete Book of Magic Science, the latter of which was one of many later sources for the Grimoire of Turiel.

A copy of the work was listed in the catalogue for the San Francisco Mercantile Library in 1854. Although access to it would have been restricted, its presence indicates that it played a role in American folk beliefs. In 1898, Arthur Edward Waite undertook the first historical study of grimoires as a genre, detailing the Arbatel as one of many important works. A copy of a German translation appeared in the Berlin publishing company Herman Barsdorf Verlag's Magische Werke in 1921. Occultist Stephen Skinner claims that the isopsephy of the names of the Olympic Spirits summing to 31, the numeration of "AL" as in Liber AL, may have been responsible for inspiring Aleister Crowley's Liber AL vel Legis, although Skinner admits that the influence on Crowley may not have been conscious.

== Editions ==
The first edition was published in 1575 in Basel, with no evidence for earlier editions despite some claims otherwise. Other editions include:

- A reprint in 1575, Basel.
- English translation by Robert Turner, London, 1655, printed in Turner's translation of the spurious "Fourth" book of Heinrich Cornelius Agrippa's Three Books of Occult Philosophy. The most popular version in the English-speaking world, though with some mistakes.
- German translation by Andreas Luppius, Wesel, 1686. Reprinted by Johann Scheible's Das Kloster. Features a number of additions and changes, including a printer's mark mistakenly assumed to be a part of the work. Andreas Luppius also published a version of the Arbatel as Clavicula Salomonis et Theosophia pneumatica.
- English translation in the British Library's Sloane Manuscripts, 3851. A different translation from Turner's, with more corruptions, errors and even missing sections. Copied from the notebook of a physician named Arthur Gauntlet. It does, however, feature a "Seal of Secrets" mentioned in one section that is absent from all other versions. This version (as part of Gauntlet's notebook) was later edited and published by David Rankine and Avalonia press as The Grimoire of Arthur Gauntlet in 2011.
- Another partial independent English translation in the Sloane MS, 17th century.
- Another German translation by Scheible, Stuttgart, 1855. Mostly follows Luppius, with some corrections to match the original Latin.
- French translation by Marc Haven, Nice, 1945. Claims to be translated from the original Latin, but appears to be a retranslation of Turner's English version.
- Latin text with parallel English translation by Joseph H. Peterson, Arbatel: Concerning the Magic of the Ancients. Newly translated, edited and annotated by Joseph H. Peterson, Ibis Press/Nicolas Hays, 2009.
