= List of angels in Ars Paulina =

Ars Paulina, the third book of the grimoire The Lesser Key of Solomon, is divided into two parts. The first part contains the angels of the hours of the day and night; the second part deals with the angels of the Zodiac signs. Unlike Ars Goetia, the first book of The Lesser Key of Solomon, Ars Paulina contains no description of the form and capabilities of the angels. Instead, it focuses on their names, seals, and the conjuration to call them forth.

== Part 1: Ruling angels of the 24 hours ==
The first part of Ars Paulina tells of angels associated with the 24 hours of day, and their servants. Each angel has many servants, but only a few chief dukes and lesser dukes are named. Each hour is also given a name. Also, only the 24 ruling angels have corresponding seals; no seals are provided for the named dukes.

Hour	Name of hour	Ruling angel	Number of servants	Named chief dukes	Named lesser dukes
1st hour of day	Barim	Samael	Many dukes and servants	Ameniel; Charpon; Darosiel; Monasiel; Brumiel; Nestoriel; Chremas; Meresyn	None
2nd hour of day	Cevorym	Anael	20 greater dukes and 100 lesser dukes	Menarchos; Archiel; Chardiel	Orphiel; Cursiel; Elmoym; Quosiel; Ermaziel; Granyel
3rd hour of day	Dansor	Vequaniel	20 greater dukes and 200 lesser dukes, and a great many other servants	Asmiel; Persiel; Mursiel; Zoesiel	Drelmech; Sadiniel; Parniel; Comadiel; Gemary; Xantiel; Serviel; Furiel
4th hour of day	Elechym	Vathmiel	10 greater dukes and 100 lesser dukes, and many servants	Armmyel; Larmich; Marfiel; Ormyel; Zardiel	Emarfiel; Permiel; Queriel; Strubiel; Diviel; Jermiel; Thuros; Vanesiel; Zasviel; Hermiel
5th hour of day	Fealech	Sasquiel	10 greater dukes and 100 lesser dukes, and very many servants	Damiel; Araniel; Maroch; Saraphiel; Putisiel	Jameriel; Futiniel; Rameriel; Amisiel; Uraniel; Omerach; Lameros; Zachiel; Fustiel; Camiel
6th hour of day	Genapherim	Saniel	10 greater dukes and 100 lesser dukes, and many other servants	Arnebiel; Charuch; Medusiel; Nathmiel; Pemiel	Gamyel; Jenotriel; Sameon; Trasiel; Xamyon; Nedabor; Permon; Brasiel; Camosiel; Evadar
7th hour of day	Hamarym	Barquiel	10 greater dukes and 100 lesser dukes, and many servants	Abrasiel; Farmos; Nestorii; Manuel; Sagiel	Harmiel; Nastrus; Varmay; Tulmas; Crosiel; Pasriel; Venesiel; Evarym; Drufiel; Kathos
8th hour of day	Jafanym	Osmadiel	10 greater dukes and 100 lesser dukes, and many servants	Sarfiel; Amalym; Chroel; Mesial; Lantrhots	Demarot; Janofiel; Larfuty; Vemael; Thribiel; Mariel; Remasyn; Theoriel; Framion; Ermiel
9th hour of day	Karron	Quabriel	10 greater dukes, 100 lesser dukes, 192,980 servants	Astroniel; Charmy; Pamory; Damyel; Nadriel	Kranos; Menas; Brasiel; Nefarym; Zoymiel; Trubas; Xermiel; Lameson; Zasnor; Janediel
10th hour of day	Lamarhon	Oriel	5,600 spiritis including dukes and servants, divided into 10 orders	Armosy; Drabiel; Penaly; Mesriel; Choreb	Lemur; Ormas; Charny; Zazyor; Naveron; Xantros; Basilion; Nameron; Kranoti; Alfrael
11th hour of day	Maneloym	Bariel	5,600 spiritis including dukes and servants, divided into 10 orders	Almariziel; Prasiniel; Chadros; Turmiel; Lamiel	Menasiel; Demasor; Omary; Helmas; Zemoel; Almas; Perman; Comial; Temas; Lanifiel
12th hour of day	Nahalon	Beratiel	3,700 spiritis including dukes and servants, divided into 12 degrees	Camaron; Astrofiel; Penatiel; Demarac; Famaras	Plamiel; Nerastiel; Fimarson; Quirix; Sameron; Edriel; Choriel; Romiel; Fenosiel; Harmary
1st hour of night	Omalharien	Sabrathan	1,540 dukes and servants, divided into 10 orders	Domaras; Amerany; Penoles; Mardiel; Nastul	Ramesiel; Omedriel; Franedac; Chrasiel; Dormason; Hayzoym; Emalon; Turtiel; Quenol; Rymaliel
2nd hour of night	Panezur	Tartys	101,550 dukes and servants divided into 12 orders	Almodar; Famoriel; Nedroz; Ormezyn; Chabriz; Praxiel	Permaz; Vameroz; Emaryel; Fromezyn; Ramaziel; Granozyn; Gabrinoz; Mercoph; Tameriel; Venomiel; Jenaziel; Xemyzin
3rd hour of night	Quabrion	Serquanich	101,550 dukes and servants divided into 12 orders	Menarym; Chrusiel; Penargos; Amriel; Demanoz; Nestoroz	Evanuel; Sarmozyn; Haylon; Quabriel; Thurmytz; Fronyzon; Vanosyr; Lemaron; Almonoyz; Janothyel; Melrotz; Xanthyozod
4th hour of night	Ramersy	Jefischa	101,550 dukes and servants divided into 12 orders	Armosiel; Nedruan; Maneyloz; Ormael; Phorsiel; Rimezyn	Rayziel; Gemezin; Fremiel; Hamayz; Japuriel; Jasphiel; Lamediel; Adroziel; Zodiel; Bramiel; Coreziel; Enatriel
5th hour of night	Sanayfar	Abasdarhon	101,550 dukes and servants divided into 12 orders	Meniel; Charaby; Appiniel; Deinatz; Nechorym; Hameriel; Vulcaniel; Samelon; Gemary; Vanescor; Samerym; Xantropy	Herphatz; Chrymas; Patrozyn; Nameton; Barmas; Platiel; Neszomy; Quesdor; Caremaz; Umariel; Kralym; Habalon
6th hour of night	Thaazaron	Zaazenach	101,550 dukes and servants divided into 12 orders	Amonazy; Menoriel; Prenostix; Namedor; Cherasiel; Dramaz; Tuberiel; Humaziel; Lanoziel; Lamerotzod; Xerphiel; Zeziel	Pammon; Dracon; Gematzod; Enariel; Rudefor; Sarmon
7th hour of night	Venaydor	Mendrion	101,550 dukes and servants divided into 12 orders	Ammiel; Choriel; Genarytz; Pandroz; Menesiel; Sameriel; Ventariel; Zachariel; Dubraz; Marchiel; Jonadriel; Pemoniel	Rayziel; Tarmytz; Anapion; Jmonyel; Framoth; Machmag
8th hour of night	Xymalim	Narcoriel	101,550 dukes and servants divided into 12 orders	Cambriel; Nedarym; Astrocon; Marifiel; Dramozyn; Lustifion; Amelson; Lemozar; Xernifiel; Kanorsiel; Bufanotz; Jamedroz	Xanoriz; Jastrion; Themaz; Hobraiym; Zymeloz; Gamsiel
9th hour of night	Zeschar	Pamyel	101,550 dukes and servants divided into 12 orders	Demaor; Nameal; Adrapan; Chermel; Fenadros; Vemasiel; Comary; Matiel; Zenoroz; Brandiel; Evandiel; Tameriel; Befranzy; Jachoroz; Xanthir; Armapy; Druchas; Sardiel	None
10th hour of night	Malcho	Iassuarim	100 greater dukes, 100 lesser dukes, many other servants	Lapheriel; Emarziel; Nameroyz	Chameray; Hazaniel; Uraniel
11th hour of night	Aalacho	Dardariel	Many dukes and servants	Cardiel; Permon; Armiel; Nastoriel; Casmiroz; Dameriel; Furamiel; Mafriel; Hariaz; Damar; Alachuc; Emeriel; Naveroz; Alaphar	Nermas; Druchas; Carman; Elamyz; Jatroziel; Lamersy; Hamarytzod
12th hour of night	Xephan	Sarandiel	Many dukes and servants	Adoniel; Damasiel; Ambriel; Meriel; Denaryz; Emarion; Kabriel; Marachy; Chabrion; Nestoriel; Zachriel; Naveriel; Damery; Namael	Hardiel; Nefrias; Irmanotzod; Gerthiel; Dromiel; Ladrotzod; Melanas

== Part 2: Ruling angels of the Zodiac signs ==
Part 2 of Ars Paulina contains mystical names of the angels of the Zodiac signs in general, and also the names of the angels of every degree and the signs. These are called the angels of men: because under some one of those signs and degrees, every man is born.

The following 12 names are attributed to 12 signs of the Zodiac. If a man knows merely his sign, but not the exact degree of his nativity, he could make use of this table.

	Aries	Taurus	Gemini	Cancer	Leo	Virgo	Libra	Scorpio	Sagittarius	Capricornus	Aquarius	Pisces
Nature	Fire	Earth	Air	Water	Fire	Earth	Air	Water	Fire	Earth	Air	Water
House-ruling angel (Atziluth)	Aiel	Tual	Giel	Cael	Ol	Voil	Jael	Josel / Sosol	So'ayasel / Suiajasel	Casujojah	Ausi[u/e]l	Pasi[e]l
Lesser assistant angel (Briah)	Sharahiel	Araziel	Saraiel	Pakiel	Shartiel	Shalathiel	Chedaqiel	Sayetziel	Saryetiel	Samaqiel	Tzakemqiel	Ukabiel

The names of the other angels which are attributed to every degree are as follows. Notice that since some angels govern more than one position, the number of distinct angels is 259.

Benjamin Rowe, in his 1999 Afterword of his publication, comments that the original Sloane Manuscript 2731 has small and cramped handwriting that is very difficult to distinguish between o, e, and a in the text. Due to this text condition, occasional correction, and page damage, some of the names have been confused between transcribers.

	Aries	Taurus	Gemini	Cancer	Leo	Virgo	Libra	Scorpio	Sagittarius	Capricornus	Aquarius	Pisces
1	Biael	Latiel	Latiel	Sachiel	Mechiel	Celiel	Ibajah	Teliel	Taliel	Chushel	Chamiel	Lachiel
2	Gesiel	Hujael	Nagael	Metiel	Satiel	Senael	Chaiel	Jeniel	Janiel	Temael	Tesael	Neliel
3	Hael	Sachiel	Sachael	Asel	Ajel	Nasael	Sahael	Cesiel	Casiel	Jaajah	Jaajeh	Sanael
4	Vaniel	Gneliel	Gnaliel	Sachiel	Mechiel	Sangiel	Naviel	Lengael	Langael	Cashiel	Camiel	Gnasiel
5	Zaciel	Panael	Paniel	Mihel	Sahel	Gnaphiel	Saziel	Naphael	Naphael	Lamajah	Lashiel	Pangael
6	Cegnel	Jezisiel	Tzisiel	Aniel	Aniel	Parziel	Gnachiel	Satziel	Satziel	Naajah	Naajah	Tzapheal
7	Japhael	Kingael	Kingael	Sasael	Masiel	Tzakiel	Patiel	Gnakiel	Gnakiel	Sasajah	Samiel	Kphiel
8	Itael	Raphiel	Raphiel	Magnael	Sengael	Kriel	Trajael	Periel	Periel	Gnamiel	Gnashiel	Ratziel
9	Cakiel	Tezael	Gnetiel	Aphiel	Aphiel	Rathiel	Kachiel	Tzethiel	Tzangiel	Paajah	Paajah	Tarajah
10	Lariel	Gnakiel	Bakiel	Sersael	Metziel	Tangiel	Baliel	Rengliel	Jebiel	Izashiel	Izamiel	Gnathiel
11	Natheel	Beriel	Geriel	Makael	Sekiel	Gnasiel	Tamael	Rebiel	Regael	Kmiel	Kshiel	Bengiel
12	Sagnel	Gethiel	Dathiel	Ariel	Ariel	Bagiel	Gnamiel	Tagiel	Tediel	Riajah	Raajah	Gebiel
13	Gabiel	Dagnel	Hegnel	Sethiel	Gnethiel	Gediel	Bangiel	Gnadiel	Gnaheel	Tashiel	Tamiel	Dagiel
14	Pegiel	Vabiel	Vabiel	Magnael	Sagiel	Dahiel	Gepheel	Bevael	Bevael	Gnamiel	Gnashiel	Hadiel
15	Gadiel	Zegiel	Zagiel	Abiel	Abiel	Hevael	Datziel	Geziel	Geziel	Baajah	Baajah	Vahajah
16	Kheel	Chadiel	Chadiel	Sagel	Magiel	Vaziel	Hekiel	Dachiel	Dachiel	Gashiel	Gashiel	Zavael
17	Leviel	Tahiel	Tahiel	Madiel	Sadiel	Zachiel	Variel	Hephiel	Hephiel	Dashiel	Dashiel	Chazael
18	Hezael	Javiel	Javiel	Athiel	Athiel	Chetiel	Zethiel	Vagael	Vagael	Haajah	Haajah	Tachael
19	Geciel	Chazael	Chazael	Savael	Muviel	Tiiel	Chengiel	Zackiel	Zackiel	Vashiel	Vashiel	Jatael
20	Bethel	Bachiel	Bachiel	Maziel	Saviel	Jechiel	Tibiel	Chabiel	Chabiel	Zamiel	Zamiel	Cajaiel
21	Giel	Getiel	Getiel	Achiel	Achiel	Cabiel	Jagiel	Tagiel	Tagiel	Chael	Chael	Bachiel
22	Dachael	Dajiel	Dajiel	Setiel	Metiel	Bagiel	Cediel	Jadiel	Jadiel	Tashiel	Tashiel	Gabiel
23	Habiel	Hachael	Hachael	Maiel	Siel	Gediel	Behel	Cahael	Cahael	Jashiel	Jashiel	Dagiel
24	Vagel	Vabiel	Vabiel	Achael	Achael	Dahiel	Gevael	Baviel	Baviel	Ciajah	Ciajah	Hediel
25	Zadiel	Zagiel	Zagiel	Sabiel	Mabiel	Hoviel	Daziel	Gezael	Gezael	Beshael	Beshael	Vahejah
26	Chahel	Chadiel	Chadiel	Magiel	Sagiel	Vaziel	Heckiel	Dachael	Dachael	Gamael	Gamael	Zavael
27	Tavael	Tahiel	Tahiel	Adiel	Adiel	Zachiel	Vatiel	Hatiel	Hatiel	Daael	Daael	Chazael
28	Jezel	Javael	Javael	Sahiel	Mahiel	Chetivel	Zajel	Vajael	Vajael	Heshael	Heshael	Tachiel
29	Cechiel	Chaziel	Chaziel	Meviel	Savael	Tajael	Chechiel	Zachiel	Zachiel	Vamiel	Vamiel	Jatael
30	Hetiel	Sachael	Sachael	Aziel	Aziel	Jachiel	Tehiel	Chasiel	Chasiel	Zaajah	Zaajah	Cajael
