= Frederick Hockley =

British occultist and scryer

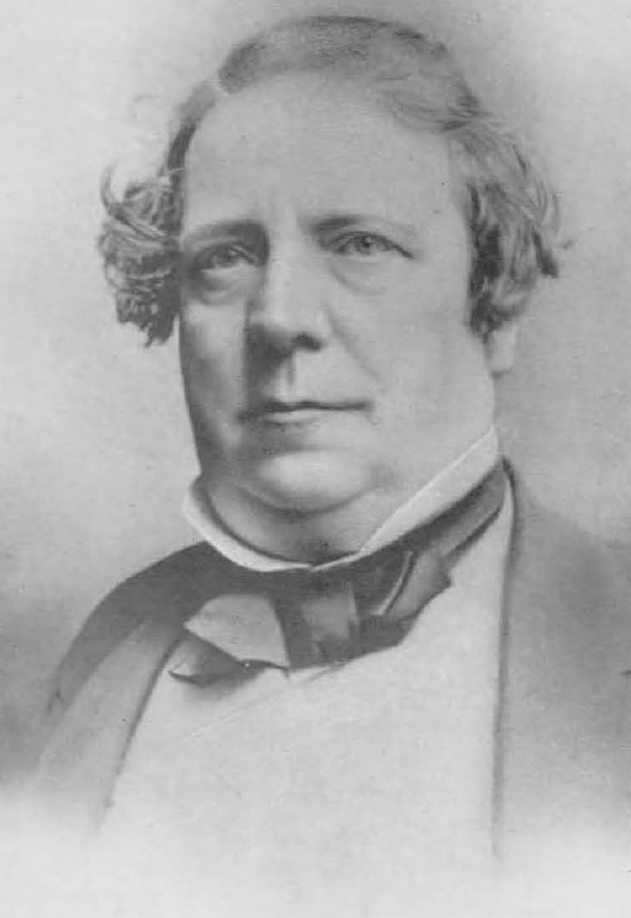
- Born: 1808
- Died: 10 November 1885 (aged 76–77)
- Occupations: Occult writer, scryer

Frederick Hockley (1808 – 10 November 1885) was a British occultist and scryer who was a London-based Freemason and a member of the Societas Rosicruciana in Anglia.

== Career ==
Hockley avidly collected and transcribed over many years a vast library of important occult books, works and texts, including a Rosicrucian manuscript belonging to Sigismund Bacstrom, who was initiated into an occult society in Mauritius in 1794. This text had a great influence on British occultism.

He established the spiritualist Croydon Circle in 1853, in which he claimed to be in communication with a group of spirits controlled by the Crowned Angel of the Seventh Sphere. This predated the first spiritualist organization in London, known as the Charing Cross Spirit Circle formed in January, 1857.

== Scrying ==
Hockley practiced the art of 'crystallomancy' or 'the art of invocating spirits by the crystal' and believed this to be one of the most important forms of spirit communication. He kept notes on many of his experiments and experiences, accumulating a vast amount of information.

It is said that through close knit London circles, his freemasonry connections and SRIA connections, as well as the extensive and vast library he left behind him on his passing that he contributed to the forming and curriculum of 'The Hermetic Order of the Golden Dawn'. It is also alleged that the original cipher manuscript on which the Golden Dawn was formed may well have been written by Hockley.

== Rosicrucians ==
Hockley was a close friend of Kenneth R. H. Mackenzie and other British Rosicrucians and occultists of his period. He was purportedly a pupil of Francis Barrett, author of The Magus (1801).

In March, 1884 he joined the London Spiritualist Alliance.

Hockley died on 10 November 1885.

== Books ==
- The Rosicrucian Seer, 1986 and 2009
- A Complete Book of Magic Science, 2008
- Solomon's Clavis or Key to Unlock the Mysteries of Magic, 2008
- Occult Spells – A Nineteenth Century Grimoire, 2009
- The Clavis or Key to the Magic of Solomon, 2009
- Invocating by Magic Crystals and Mirrors, 2010
- Journal of a Rosicrucian Philosopher, 2010
- Abraham the Jew on Magic Talismans, 2011
- A Book of the Offices of Spirits, 2011
- Clavis Arcana Magica, 2012
- Experimentum, Potens Magna in Occult Philosophy, 2012
- Dr. Rudd's Nine Hierarchies of Angels, 2013
- Ars Notoria – The Notary Art of Solomon, 2015
- The Pauline Art of Solomon, 2016
- Mr. Yardley's Process, 2016 Éditions Les Trois R
- The Clavis or Key to Unlock the Mysteries of Magic, 2019
- Book of Good Angels, 2019
