= List of theological demons =

List of demons by name

This is a list of demons that appear in religion, demonology, mythology, and folklore. It is not a list of names of demons, although some are listed by more than one name.

The list of demons in fiction includes those from literary fiction with doctrinal aspirations, such as Dante's Inferno. Because numerous lists of legendary creatures concern mythology, folklore, and folk fairy tales, much overlap may be present.

== Key ==
Each entry names a demon and gives a source in parentheses.

Sources named

Demonology: Ayyavazhi, Christian, Hindu, Islamic, Jewish, Thelemite

Folklore: Bulgarian, Christian, German, Jewish, Islamic, Philippine

Mythology: Akkadian, Babylonian, Buddhist, Chaldean, Chinese, Christian, Egyptian, Etruscan, Finnish, Greek, Gnostic, Guanche, Hindu, Hungarian, Indonesian, Irish, Japanese, Mandaean, Mapuche, Moabite, Native American, Persian, Phoenician, Roman, Slavic, Semitic, Sumerian, Zoroastrian

Many demons have names with several spellings but few are listed under more than one spelling.

== A ==
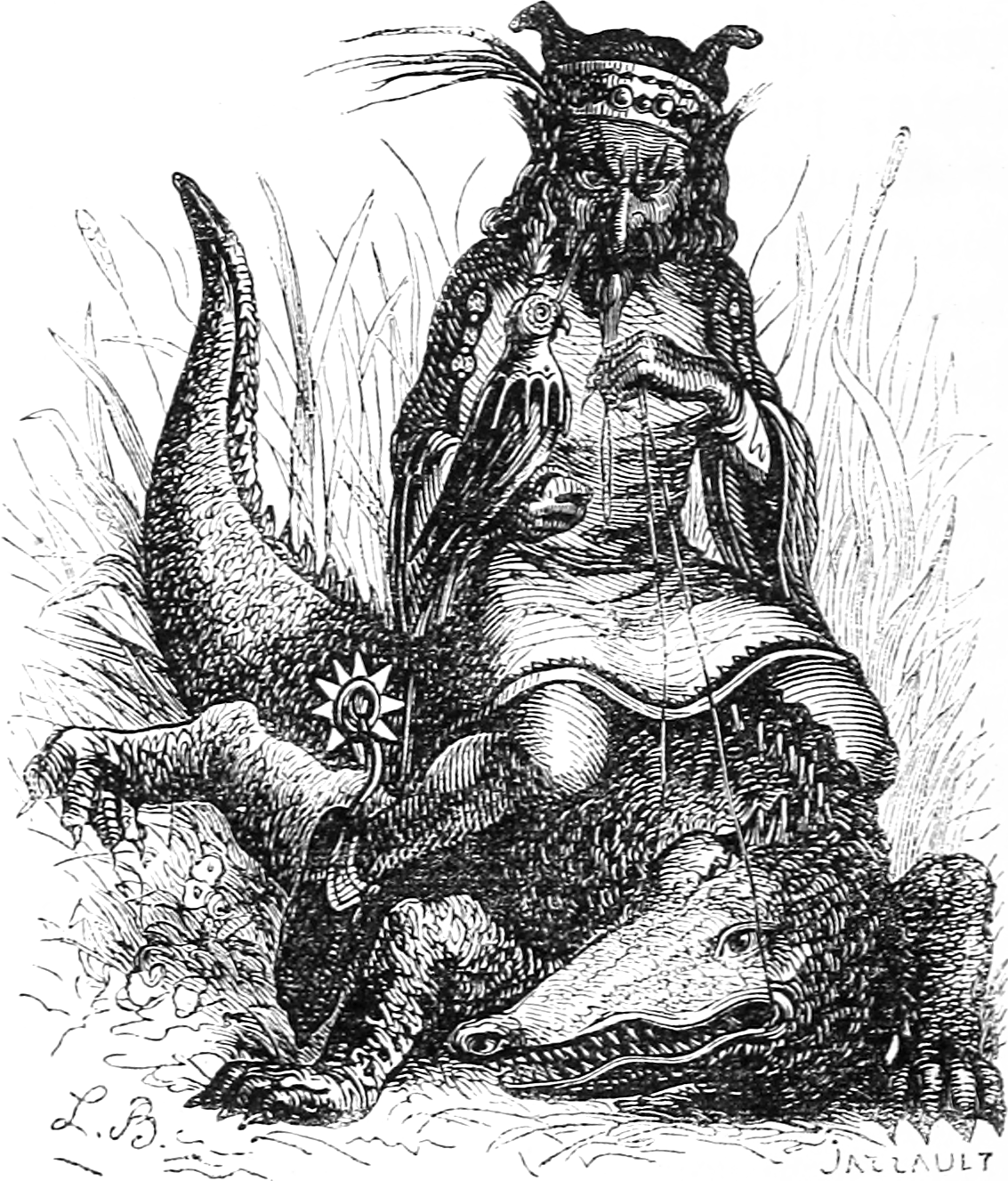
Agares depicted in the Dictionnaire Infernal

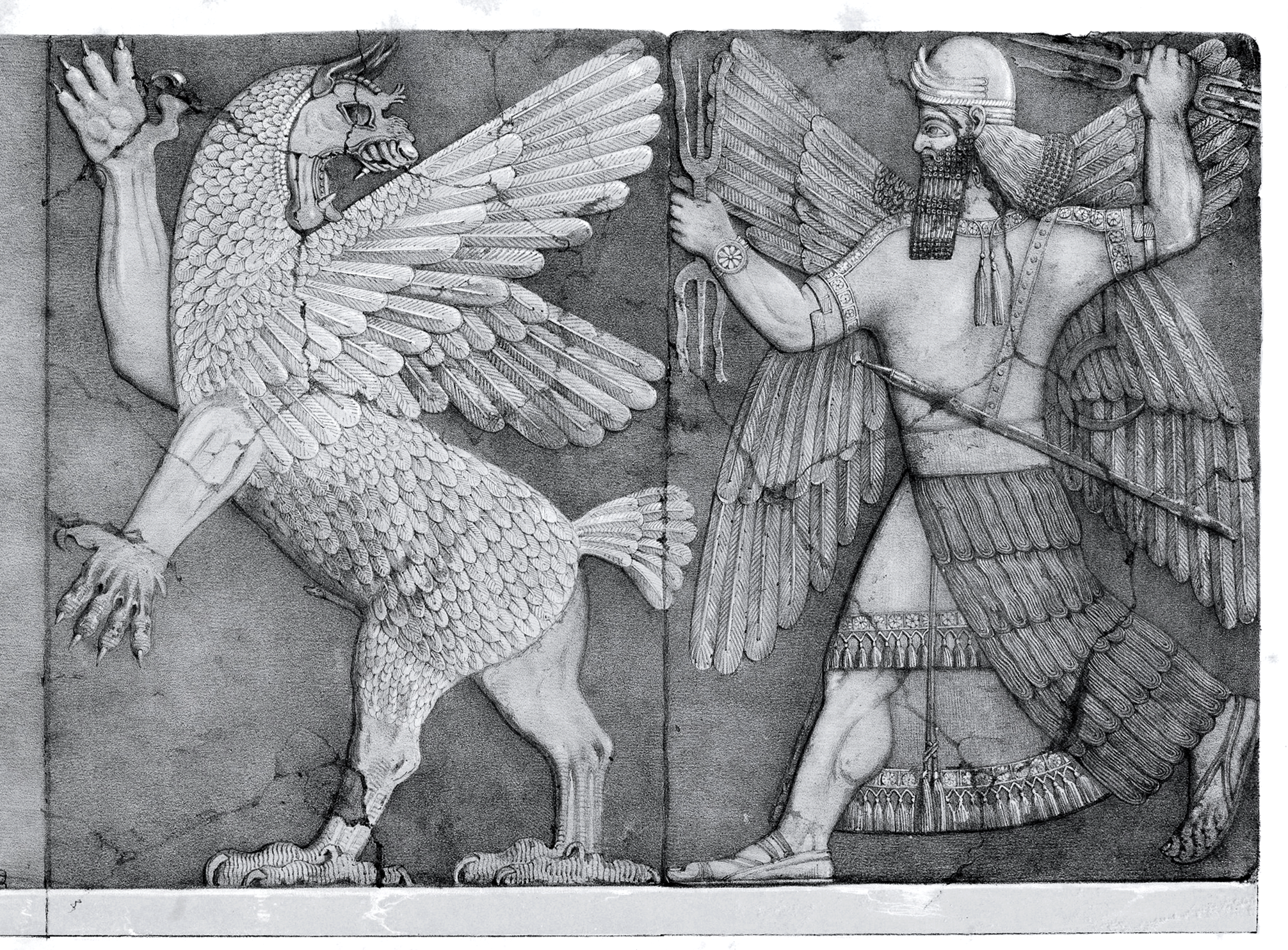
Anzu pursued by Ninurta, palace relief, Nineveh

- Aamon/Amon (Christian demonology)
- Abaddon/Apollyon (Christian demonology)
- Abezethibou (Jewish demonology)
- Abraxas (Gnosticism)
- Abyzou (Jewish mythology)
- Achlys (Greek mythology)
- Adrammelech (Assyrian mythology, Christian demonology)
- Aeshma (Zoroastrianism)
- Agaliarept (Jewish mythology)
- Agrat bat Mahlat (Jewish demonology)
- Agares (Christian demonology)
- Agiel (Jewish mythology)
- Ahriman/Angra Mainyu (Zoroastrianism)
- Aim/Haborym (Christian demonology)
- Aka Manah/Akem Manah/Akoman/Akvan (Zoroastrianism)
- Akuma (Japanese Buddhism, Japanese Christianity)
- Al Ana (Turkish folklore)
- Ala (Slavic mythology)
- Alal (Chaldean mythology)
- Alastor (Christian demonology)
- Alloces/Allocer (Christian demonology)
- Allu (Akkadian mythology)
- Amaymon (Christian demonology)
- Amdusias (Christian demonology)
- Amalanhig (Philippine folklore)
- Amy (Christian demonology)
- Anammelech (Assyrian mythology)
- Anathan (Mandaean mythology)
- Anaye (Navajo mythology)
- Anqa (Arabian folklore)
- Ancitif (Christian demonology)
- Andhaka (Hindu mythology)
- Andras (Christian demonology)
- Andrealphus (Christian demonology)
- Andromalius (Christian demonology)
- Anti (Sumerian mythology)
- Anzû/Bhavna/Imdugud/Zû (Sumerian mythology)
- Apaosha (Persian mythology)
- Armaros (Jewish demonology)
- Archon (Gnosticism)
- Arioch (Christian mythology)
- Arunasura (Hindu mythology)
- Asag (Sumerian demonology)
- Asakku (Babylonian mythology)
- Asb'el (Jewish mythology)
- Asmodai/Asmodeus (Jewish folklore, Christian mythology, Islamic folklore)
- Aswang (Philippine folklore)
- Astaroth (Christian demonology)
- Asura (Hindu mythology, Buddhism, Shinto)
- Azazel/Azaz'el (Jewish mythology, Islamic folklore)
- Azi Dahaka/Dahak (Zoroastrianism)

== B ==
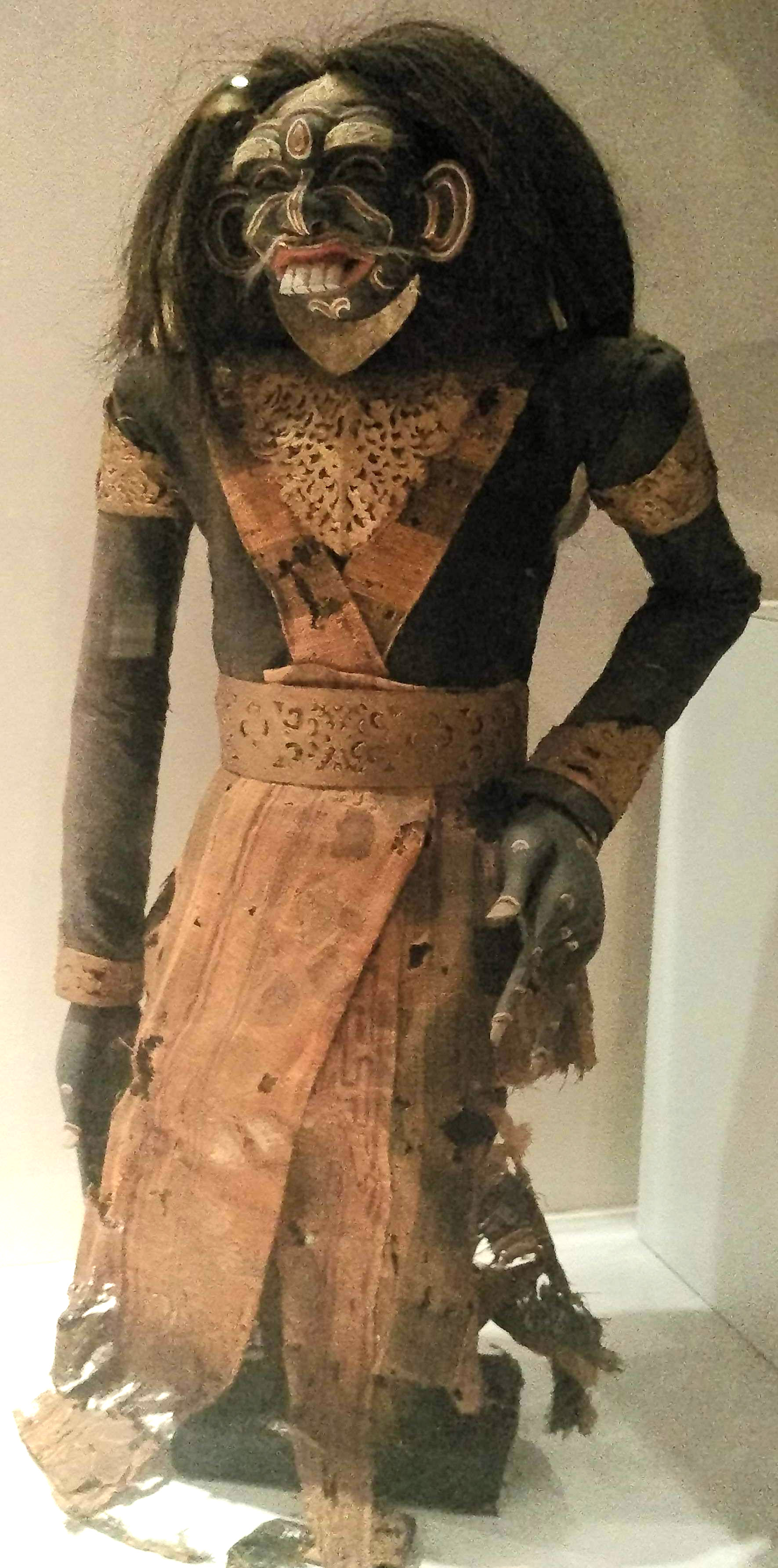
Barong miniature, National Gallery, Jakarta

- Baal/Bael (Christian demonology)
- Babi ngepet (Indonesian mythology)
- Bakasura (Hindu mythology)
- Baku (Japanese mythology)
- Balam (Christian demonology)
- Balberith (Jewish demonology)
- Bali Raj (Hindu mythology)
- Banshee (Irish mythology)
- Baphomet (Christian folklore, Islamic Folklore, Jewish Mysticism, Satanism, Thelema)
- Barbatos (Christian demonology)
- Barong (Indonesian mythology)
- Bathin/Mathim/Bathym/Marthim (Christian demonology)
- Beelzebub (Jewish and Christian demonology)
- Belial (Jewish Christian demonology)
- Beleth (Christian demonology)
- Belphegor (Christian demonology)
- Berith/Beherit (Phoenician mythology, Christian demonology)
- Bhūta (Hindu mythology)
- Bifrons (Christian demonology)
- Boruta (Slavic mythology)
- Botis (Christian demonology)
- Buer (Christian demonology)
- Bukavac (Slavic mythology)
- Bune (Christian demonology)
- Bushyasta (Zoroastrianism)

== C ==
- Caim/Camio (Christian demonology)
- Cambion (Medieval folklore)
- Charun (Etruscan mythology)
- Chemosh (Moabite mythology)
- Choronzon (Thelema)
- Chort (Slavic mythology)
- Cimejes/Kimaris/Cimeies (Christian demonology)
- Corson (Christian demonology)
- Crocell/Procell (Christian demonology)

== D ==
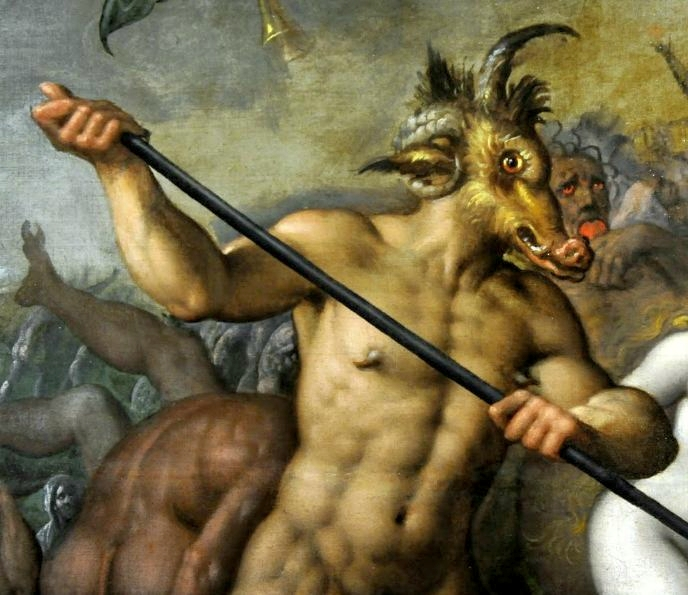
A typical depiction of the Devil in Christian art. The goat, ram, dog and pig are consistently associated with the Devil. Detail of a 16th-century painting by Jacob de Backer in the National Museum, Warsaw.

- Daeva (Zoroastrianism)
- Dagon (Semitic mythology)
- Dajjal (Islamic mythology)
- Dantalion (Christian demonology)
- Danjal (Jewish mythology)
- Decarabia (Christian demonology)
- Demogorgon (Christian demonology)
- Dev (Persian, Islamic demonology)
- Devil (Demonology/Diabology)
- Div-e Sepid (Persian mythology)
- Djall (Albanian mythology)
- Drekavac (Slavic mythology)
- Dzoavits (Native American mythology)

== E ==
- Eblis/Iblis/Ibris (Islamic demonology)
- Eligos (Christian demonology)
- Eisheth (Jewish demonology)
- Erlik (Turkic mythology)

== F ==
- Focalor (Christian demonology)
- Foras/Forcas/Forras (Christian demonology)
- Forneus (Christian demonology)
- Furcas/Forcas (Christian demonology)
- Furfur (Christian demonology)

== G ==
- Gaap (Christian demonology)
- Gader'el (Jewish demonology)
- Gadulta (Mandaean mythology)
- Gaf (Mandaean mythology)
- Gaki (Japanese mythology)
- Gamigin (Christian demonology)
- Ghaddar (Islamic folklore)
- Ghoul (Arabian and world-wide mythologies via adaptation from arabs)
- Giu (Mandaean mythology)
- Glasya-Labolas/Caacrinolaas/Caassimolar/Classyalabolas/Glassia-labolis (Christian demonology)
- Gorgon (Greek mythology)
- Gremory/Gomory (Christian demonology)
- Grigori (Jewish demonology)
- Gualichu (Mapuche mythology)
- Guayota (Guanche mythology)
- Gusion/Gusoin/Gusoyn (Christian demonology)

== H ==
- Haagenti (Christian demonology)
- Hag (Mandaean mythology)
- Halphas/Malthus (Christian demonology)
- Haures/Flauros/Flavros/Hauras/Havres (Christian demonology)
- Hinn (Islamic folklore)
- Hanbi (Sumerian mythology)
- Hannya (Japanese mythology)

== I ==
- Ifrit (Islamic demonology)
- Incubus (Jewish and Christian demonology)
- Ipos/Ipes (Christian demonology)
- Imp (European Mythology)

== J ==
- Jinn (Islamic demonology)
- Jikininki (Japanese mythology)

== K ==
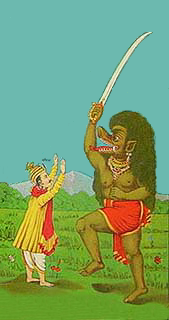
Kali (right) wielding a sword

- Kabandha/Kabhanda (Hindu mythology)
- Kallikantzaros (Greek/ Byzantine/ Slavic)
- Kara İye (Turkish mythology)
- Kasadya (Jewish demonology)
- Kokabiel (Jewish mythology)
- Kroni (Ayyavazhi demonology)
- Krampus (Germanic-Christian demonology)
- Krun (Mandaean mythology)
- Killakee Cat (Hell Fire Club)
- Kukudh (Albanian mythology)
- Kulshedra (Albanian mythology)
- Kumbhakarna (Hindu mythology)

== L ==
- Lamashtu (Mesopotamian mythology)
- Lamia (Greek mythology)
- Latabi (Mandaean mythology)
- Legion (Christian demonology)
- Lechies (Slavic mythology)
- Leonard (Christian demonology)
- Leyak (Indonesian (Balinese) mythology)
- Lempo (Finnish mythology)
- Leraje/Leraie (Christian demonology)
- Leviathan (according to certain interpretations of Jewish, Gnostic and Christian mythology)
- Lili/Lilin/Lilim (Jewish mythology)
- Lilith (Akkadian mythology, Jewish folklore, Mandaean mythology)
- Ljubi (Albanian mythology)
- Lucifer (Christian mythology)
- Lucifuge Rofocale (Christian demonology)

== M ==
- Mag (Mandaean mythology)
- Mahishasur (Hindu mythology)
- Manananggal (Philippine folklore)
- Malphas (Christian demonology)
- Mammon (Christian mythology)
- Mara (Buddhist mythology)
- Marbas (Christian mythology)
- Maricha (Hindu mythology)
- Marid (Islamic demonology)
- Marax/Morax/Foraii (Christian demonology)
- Marchosias (Christian demonology)
- Mastema (Jewish demonology)
- Mazoku (Japanese folklore)
- Mephistopheles (Christian folklore, German folklore)
- Merihem (Christian demonology)
- Moloch (Jewish, Pagan and Christian mythology)
- Murmur (Christian demonology)

== N ==
- Naamah (Jewish mythology)
- Naberius/Cerbere/Naberus (Christian demonology)
- Nalai (Mandaean mythology)
- Namtar (Sumerian mythology)
- Nar as-samum (Islamic folklore)
- Narakasura (Hindu mythology)
- Ninurta (Sumerian mythology, Akkadian mythology)
- Niuli (Mandaean mythology)
- Nüba (Chinese Mythology)

== O ==
- Old Scratch (English folklore)
- Oni (Japanese folklore)
- Onoskelis (Jewish mythology)
- Orcus (Roman mythology, later Christian demonology)
- Orias/Oriax (Christian demonology)
- Orobas (Christian demonology)
- Ose (Christian demonology)
- Ördög (Hungarian mythology)
- O Tokata (Indonesian mythology)

== P ==
- Paimon (Christian demonology)
- Pazuzu (Babylonian demonology)
- Pelesit (Indonesian and Malaysian mythology)
- Phenex (Christian demonology)
- Penemue (Jewish and Christian mythology)
- Pocong (Indonesian and Malaysia mythology)
- Pontianak (Indonesian and Malaysian mythology)
- Preta (Buddhist demonology)
- Purson (Christian demonology)
- Printer's devil (European folklore)
- Pruflas (Christian demonology)
- Puloman (Hindu mythology)

== Q ==
- Qin (Mandaean mythology)

== R ==
- Rahab (Jewish folklore)
- Rahovart (Christian demonology)
- Rakshasa (Hindu mythology)
- Rangda (Indonesian mythology)
- Raum (Christian demonology)
- Ravana (Hindu mythology)
- Rimmon (Christian demonology)
- Ronove (Christian demonology)
- Ribesal (Christian demonology)
- Rusalka (Slavic mythology)
- Ruha (Mandaean mythology)
- Revenant (British demonology)

== S ==
- Sabnock (Christian demonology)
- Saleos (Christian demonology)
- Samael (Jewish and Gnostic mythology)
- Salpsan (Christian demonology)
- Satan (Abrahamic religions, demonology and mythology)
- Satanachia (Christian demonology)
- Seir (Christian demonology)
- Semyaza (Jewish mythology)
- Shax/Chax (Christian demonology)
- Shaitan (Jewish, Islamic demonology)
- Shedim (Jewish folklore)
- Shdum (Mandaean mythology)
- Sitri (Christian demonology)
- Stihi (Albanian mythology)
- Stolas/Solas (Christian demonology)
- Suanggi (Indonesian mythology)
- Succubus (Jewish and Christian demonology)
- Surgat (Christian demonology)
- Sut (Islamic demonology)
- Shinigami (Japanese mythology)
- Shuten Doji (Japanese mythology)

== T ==
- Tannin (Arabian, Cannanite, Christian, Phoenician, Jewish mythology)
- El Tío (Folk Catholicism)
- Tengu (Shinto)
- Titivillus
- Toyol (Indonesian and Malaysian mythology)
- Tuchulcha (Etruscan mythology)

== U ==
- Ukobach (Christian demonology)
- Unclean spirit (Christian demonology)
- Ur (Mandaean mythology)

== V ==
- Valac (Christian demonology)
- Valefar/Malaphar/Malephar (Christian demonology)
- Vanth (Etruscan mythology)
- Vapula (Christian demonology)
- Vassago (Christian demonology)
- Vepar (Christian demonology)
- Vine (Christian demonology)
- Vual (Christian demonology)

== W ==
- Wechuge (Athabaskan mythology)
- Wangliang (Chinese mythology)

== X ==
- Xaphan (Christian demonology)
- Xezbeth (middle-eastern demonology)

== Y ==
- Yan-gant-y-tan (French mythology)
- Yeqon (Jewish mythology)

== Z ==
- Zabaniyya (Islamic folklore)
- Zagan (Christian demonology)
- Zahreil (Mandaean mythology)
- Zartai-Zartanai (Mandaean mythology)
- Zepar (Christian demonology)
- Ziminiar (Christian demonology)

== See also ==
- Classification of demons
- Demonology
- Hell
- List of deities
- List of demons in fiction
