= Forcas =

Forcas may refer to one of the two demons depicted in Ars Goetia and Pseudomonarchia Daemonum:

- Foras (Forcas, Forras, Forracis), President of Hell, commanding 29 legions of demons;
- Furcas (Forcas), Knight of Hell, commanding 20 legions of demons.
