= Satanachia =

Commander of demons in the Grand Grimoire

Satanachia is described in the Grand Grimoire as a commander-in-chief of Satan's army, who controls either forty-five or fifty-four legions of demons, including Pruflas, Aamon, Barbatos, and Astaroth. According to the Grand Grimoire, he has the power to subjugate all women and girls, and to do with them whatever he wishes.
