= Midnight (upcoming film) =

- Directed by: Joshua Otis Miller
- Written by: Lamont Magee; Jeff Byrd
- Produced by: Jordan Yale Levine; Jordan Beckerman; Rosario Dawson; Elizabeth Rucinski; Timothy Christian; Rab Butler; David Gere; Chelsea Vale; Beth Bryant; Alexandra Shipp; Milla Jovovich
- Starring: Alexandra Shipp; Rosario Dawson; Milla Jovovich; Ryan Guzman
- Edited by: Mike Kruger
- Production companies: Yale Productions; Night Fox Entertainment; Rabbits Black
- Country: United States
- Language: English

Midnight is an upcoming American action-thriller film directed by Joshua Otis Miller (in his directorial debut) and written by Lamont Magee and Jeff Byrd. It stars Alexandra Shipp, Rosario Dawson, Milla Jovovich, and Ryan Guzman.

== Premise ==
A young, blind woman is hunted by a group of international criminals searching for a package they believe was given to the woman by her federal agent sister.

== Cast ==
- Alexandra Shipp as Emma
- Rosario Dawson as Grace
- Milla Jovovich as Katarina
- Ryan Guzman as Herrera

== Production ==
In August 2024, an action-thriller film titled Midnight had completed principal photography in Connecticut, with filmmaker Joshua Otis Miller making his directorial debut, and Lamont Magee and Jeff Byrd writing the screenplay. Alexandra Shipp, Rosario Dawson, Milla Jovovich, and Ryan Guzman rounded out the main cast, with Dawson also serving as a producer. In July 2025, it was revealed that Shipp and Jovovich also served as producers.
