= Sepharvaim =

Biblical city

Sepharvaim (Biblical Hebrew: סְפַרְוָיִם, romanized: Səp̄arwāyīm) was a city mentioned in the Bible as being captured by the Neo-Assyrian Empire. Sargon II probably conquered them, as recorded in the Hebrew Bible in 2 Kings 17:24, 31; 18:34; 19:13; and Isaiah 37:13. It was a double city and received the common name Sepharvaim, i.e., "the two Sipparwas", or "the two booktowns".

Sippar on the east bank of the Euphrates is now called Tel Abu Habba; Sippar-Amnanum is 6km upstream. The recent discovery of cuneiform inscriptions at Amarna in Egypt, consisting of official despatches to Pharaoh Akhenaten and his predecessor from their agents in Canaan, leads some Egyptologists to conclude that an active literary intercourse was carried on between these nations, and that the medium of the correspondence was the Akkadian language and script.

Sepharvaim was the center of the worship of the god Adrammelech. They also worshipped the god Anammelech. After the deportation of the Israelites to Assyria, at least some of the residents of this city were brought to Samaria to repopulate it with other Gentile settlers.
