= Ryan Guzman =

American actor (born 1987)

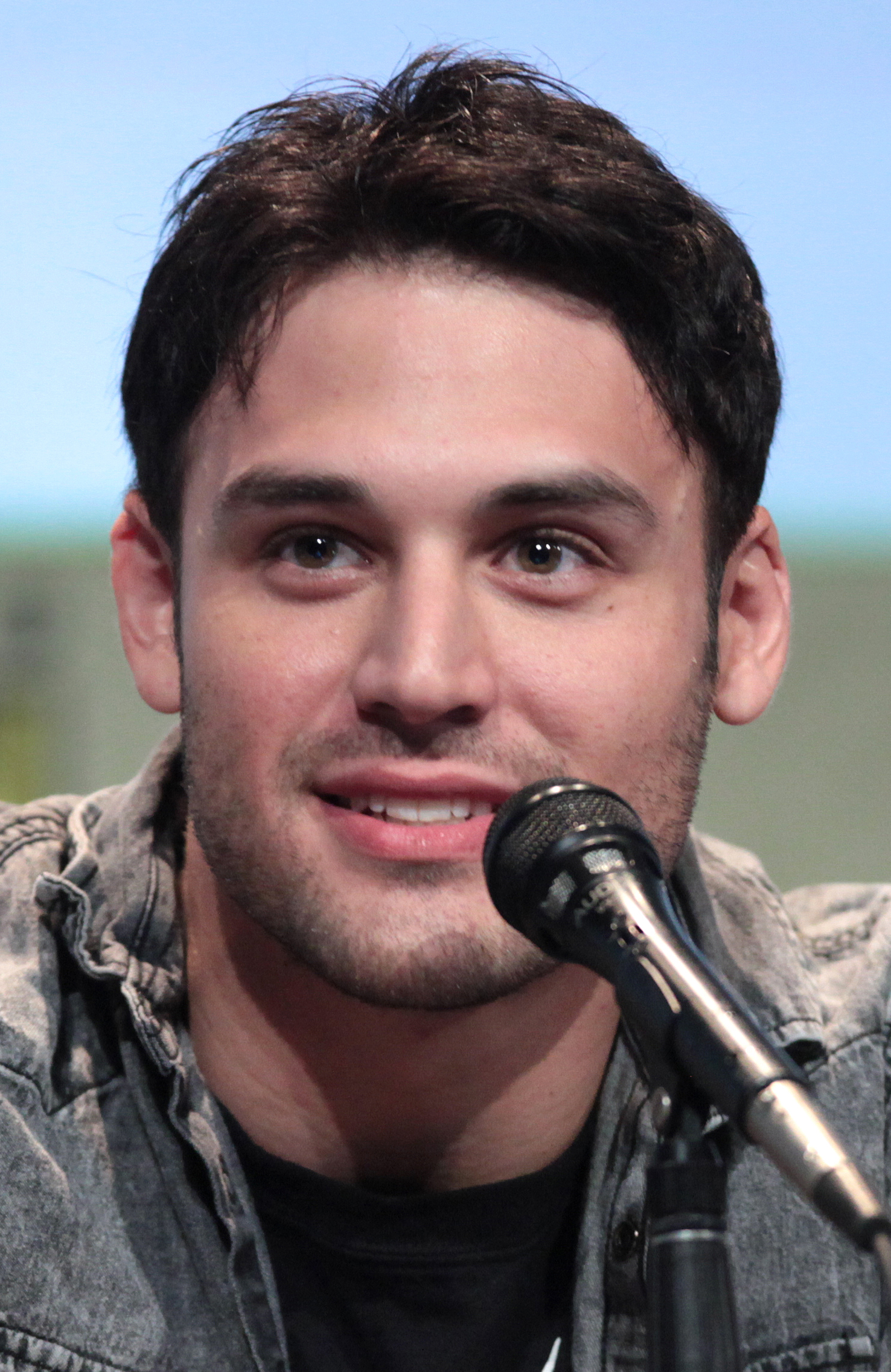
- Guzman in 2015
- Born: Ryan Anthony Guzman; September 21, 1987 (age 39); Abilene, Texas, U.S.
- Education: Sierra College
- Occupation: Actor
- Years active: 2012–present
- Notable work: Step Up; 9-1-1
- Partner(s): Chrysti Ane (2018–2023)
- Children: 2

Ryan Anthony Guzman (born September 21, 1987) is an American actor. He is known for his lead roles as Sean Asa in Step Up Revolution and Step Up: All In, part of the Step Up film series, as Noah Sandborn in the psychological thriller The Boy Next Door and as Edmundo "Eddie" Diaz in the Fox/ABC procedural drama 9-1-1.

== Early life ==
Guzman was born in Abilene, Texas to Ramón Guzmán Jr., an immigrant from Mexico and Lisa Anne (née Hudson), a Californian with English, German, French, Dutch and Swedish ancestry, and has a younger brother, Steven. His family later moved to his mother's hometown of Sacramento, California, where he graduated from West Campus High School in 2005 and attended Sierra College.

During his youth, Guzman briefly studied in a Catholic seminary for the priesthood, before dissociating from the religion. He later said he started reading the Bible again but was more religiously open.

Guzman started Taekwondo at the age of seven and continued on to earn his Black Belt at the age of ten. He also played baseball in high school and college but was forced to give it up due to a shoulder injury and an unsuccessful surgery.

== Career ==
Before going into acting, Guzman was a mixed martial arts fighter, until his fighting license expired in 2010, plus a print and commercial model with Wilhelmina Models and Look Model Agency from the age of 18, when he moved to San Francisco. He modeled for Abercrombie & Fitch and Reebok, as well as starred in television commercials for Old Navy, Gillette, among others. Guzman began auditioning for acting roles and landed the lead role as Sean Asa in the fourth movie in the Step Up film series, Step Up Revolution in 2012, despite having no formal training in dancing, "my first dance lesson was Step Up Revolution." He added, it was "by luck. I think everybody was drunk when they saw me audition. No, it was a long process: four acting and six dancing auditions. The director, Scott Speer, said there was some kind of magic between me and Kathryn (McCormick) he wanted to have in the movie." He reprised the lead role as Sean Asa in 2014, in the sequel, the fifth and final installment of the film series, Step Up: All In. Coming back into the high-energy franchise, Guzman said, "The hardest thing is matching my skill level to the professional dancers who've been dancing for 25 years," adding that, "acting like I can dance is one thing, but making it believable to the audience is another. I'm training nonstop with these dancers, learning the ins and outs and everything I can to make it look like I'm as good as they are." He also credited his mixed martial arts training, "the discipline and determination I had to have for martial arts, I carry on as an actor."

Between the two Step Up films, Guzman starred in two other films in 2014, There's Always Woodstock and April Rain. He also made his television debut as a recurring cast member in ABC Family's television adaptation of Sara Shepard's Pretty Little Liars, as Jake in the fourth season. His character was originally supposed to be on the show for only one or two episodes, he explained, "I think I got along with the cast and the producers liked how I was playing Jake, so they slowly started writing me into the show more." Jake remained in the show for nine episodes. In 2015, Guzman starred as an extremely intelligent student, Noah Sandborn, in the titular role of The Boy Next Door, an American erotic psychological thriller film, opposite Jennifer Lopez, as his teacher Claire, who he had a brief affair with at her school, and then pursued her aggressively. Guzman explained how he prepared for the role,

I did a bunch of research on different serial killers because I feel like serial killers are people that you don't ever see coming. They're these people that give off this fake life, this fake attitude. And play this game with others that are around them and hide their true nature and they slowly but surely let out their true nature. And then finally when people find out they're actually pretty evil, it's way too late.

— Ryan Guzman, in "9 Things You Didn't Know About The Boy Next Door's Ryan Guzman", InStyle

Guzman's first main role in a television series was the NBC's superhero drama Heroes Reborn, as a continuation of Heroes. He starred as Carlos Gutierrez, a war hero who lives in Los Angeles with his brother Oscar and nephew José. In 2018, he joined the second season of 9-1-1 as a main cast member, playing LAFD firefighter Edmundo "Eddie" Diaz.

In late 2024, Ryan Guzman appeared on the digital cover of Xmag UK, coinciding with coverage of his action film Midnight and boosting his visibility in European fashion media. Around the same time, he graced the cover of DA MAN magazine in Indonesia, in a fashion‑editorial spread that highlighted his modeling roots and growing style credibility. These appearances reflect his evolution from early brand shoots for labels such as Affliction and Reebok into editorial-led fashion representation, cementing his cross‑industry appeal during 2024 and 2025.

== Personal life ==
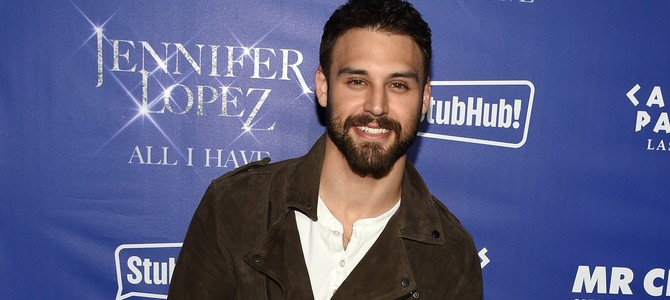
Guzman in January 2016

Guzman met Brazilian actress Chrysti Ane in 2017. The couple has two children. In 2023, Guzman and Ane ended their relationship.

== Filmography ==
=== Film ===
Year	Title	Role	Notes	Ref.
2012	Step Up Revolution	Sean Asa		
2014	There's Always Woodstock	Dylan		
2014	April Rain a.k.a. Elite Force	Alex Stone	Premiered on Showtime	
2014	Step Up: All In	Sean Asa		
2015	The Boy Next Door	Noah Sandborn		
2015	Beyond Paradise	Sebastian		
2015	Jem and the Holograms	Rio Raymond		
2016	Everybody Wants Some!!	Kenny Roper		
2018	Papi Chulo	Rodrigo		
2018	Armed	Jonesie		
2018	Backtrace	Lucas		
2019	Windows on the World	Fernando Reynoso		
2019	The Cleansing Hour	Max		
2024	The Present	Richard Addison		
TBA	Midnight	Herrera	Post-production	

=== Television ===
Year	Title	Role	Notes	Ref.
2012	Cameras	Ryan	Episode: "Walrus"	
2013	Ladies' Man: A Made Movie	Brett	Television film (MTV)	
2013–2014	Pretty Little Liars	Jake	Recurring role; 9 episodes	
2015	Heroes Reborn	Carlos Gutierrez	Main role	
2016	Notorious	Ryan Mills	Main role	
2017	Chopped Junior	Judge	Episode: "Three Ring Kitchen"	
2018-present	9-1-1	Edmundo "Eddie" Diaz	Main role (season 2–present)	
2021	9-1-1: Lone Star	Edmundo "Eddie" Diaz	Episode: "Hold the Line"	
2024	Celebrity Family Feud	Himself	Contestant; Episode: "Fantasy Sweets vs Golden Five and 9-1-1 vs Jury Duty"	
2026	9-1-1: Nashville	Edmundo "Eddie" Diaz	Episode: "Spirit of the Games"	
