= Enêpsigos =

Fallen angel in the Testament of Solomon

Enêpsigos ( Ἐνέψιγος) is a fallen angel mentioned in the Testament of Solomon who takes three forms as her abode is the moon, and at times is conjured as Kronos. In it, she is said to have been bound by triple-link chains and to have given a prophecy to King Solomon who did not believe the prophecy and then proceeded to rebound her in chains, this time, unbreakable.

== Entity ==
Enêpsigos is an angel mentioned in the Testament of Solomon 64: 1-7 where King Solomon asked Enêpsigos which angel she was frustrated by. However, Enêpsigos refers to herself as a goddess, replying back, "I undergo changes, like the goddess I am called". Enêpsigos is also linked to "ancient forms of the Triple Goddesses" and is distinguished as being able to shape shift into a goddess as one of her forms. Enêpsigos' three forms are in correlation with the moon's waxing, full, and new phases. Enêpsigos' most cited form is a woman with two heads. She can also take the form of the Greek Titan Kronos. There is a pattern of triplicity associated with Enêpsigos as she is bounded with triple-link chains by King Solomon. This connection to ancient Triple Goddesses has a tie to witchcraft as does the moon; Enêpsigos is pursuing the act of drawing down the moon with magic just as witches attempted to do in caves.

== Related ==
Rathanael

In the Testament of Solomon, Enêpsigos is frustrated by Rathanael who resides in the third heaven and is the thwarter of demons. He is said to also have the power of inhibiting and controlling the female demon Enêpsigos as she is a moon goddess and should be identified as Hekate. The third heaven is located beyond the sight of humans, the dwelling place of God.

Ashmedai

Also in the Testament of Solomon, Ashmedai also takes three forms and is bound with triple-link chains by King Solomon.

"In the Talmud, Solomon gives Benaiahu 'a chain on which was graven the divine Name and a ring on which was graven the Name...' to bind Ashmedai."

Both Enêpsigos and Ashmedai share the above characteristics as well as a spoken prophecy to King Solomon about the destruction of his kingdom.

== Prophecy ==
"In the Testament of Solomon, Enêpsigos is bound by King SOLOMON with a triple-link chain and is made to prophesy. She predicts that Solomon’s kingdom will be divided and the Temple of Jerusalem will be destroyed by the kings of the Persians, Medes, and Chaldeans. The tools in the temple will be used to serve other gods. The vessels used to trap all the demons will be broken by men, and the freed demons will go throughout the world, leading men astray until the Son of God is crucified. This Son shall be born of a virgin and shall be the only one to hold power over all demons. His name is Emmanuel (Emmanouel), the letters of whose name add up to the numbers 644. Solomon does not believe Enêpsigos and has her bound in unbreakable chains. But later he witnesses the truth of part of her prophecy, when he is led astray by women to worship pagan gods, and his kingdom is divided by God."

== See also ==
- Third Heaven
