= Zaebos =

Demon as a soldier riding upon a crocodile

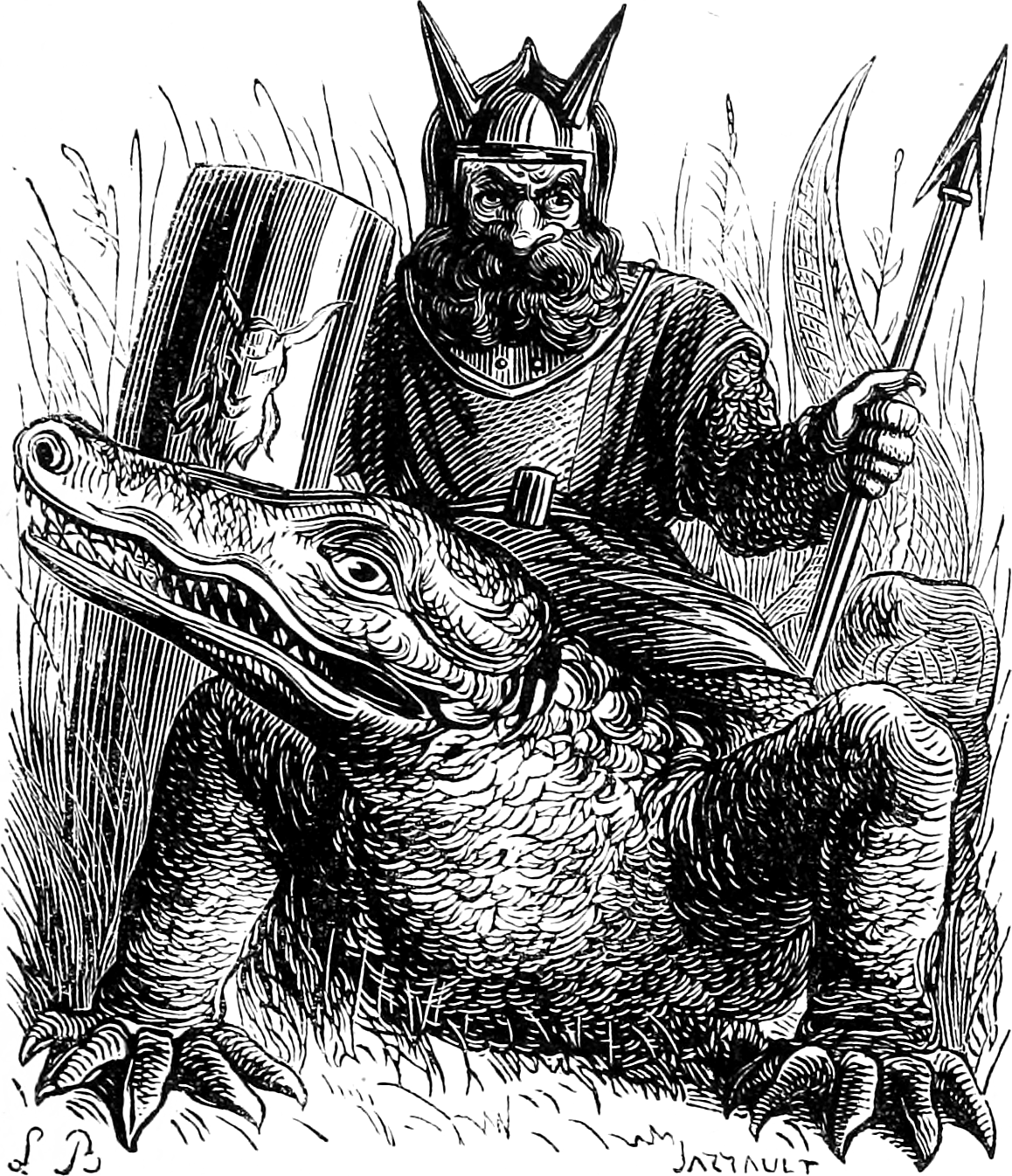
Illustration of Zaebos from the 1863 edition of Dictionnaire Infernal

Zaebos is a demon or spirit mentioned in the Dictionnaire Infernal. It is described as the Grand Count of the infernal realms and is said to appear in the form of a handsome soldier mounted on a crocodile.
