= Xezbeth =

Demon of lies and legends

In demonology, Xezbeth (alternately Shezbeth) is a demon of lies and legends, who invents untrue tales. Its name in Arabic is "The Liar" (Arabic: الكذّاب al-Kadhāb).

According to French occultist Collin de Plancy's Dictionnaire Infernal (1853 or 1863), it is impossible to count the number of its disciples.
