= Ghaddar =

Islamic demon

Gharrār is a demon in Islamic mythology and Islam related folklore. The Gharrār is described as a demon resembling dogs or goats, sired by Iblis and a demon from the fires of Samum. Usually female, she preys upon men to assault them and mutilate their genitalia. This demon is expected to live in deserts near the Red Sea.

== See also ==
- Hinn
- Se'irim
