= Melchom =

Demon in the Dictionnaire Infernal

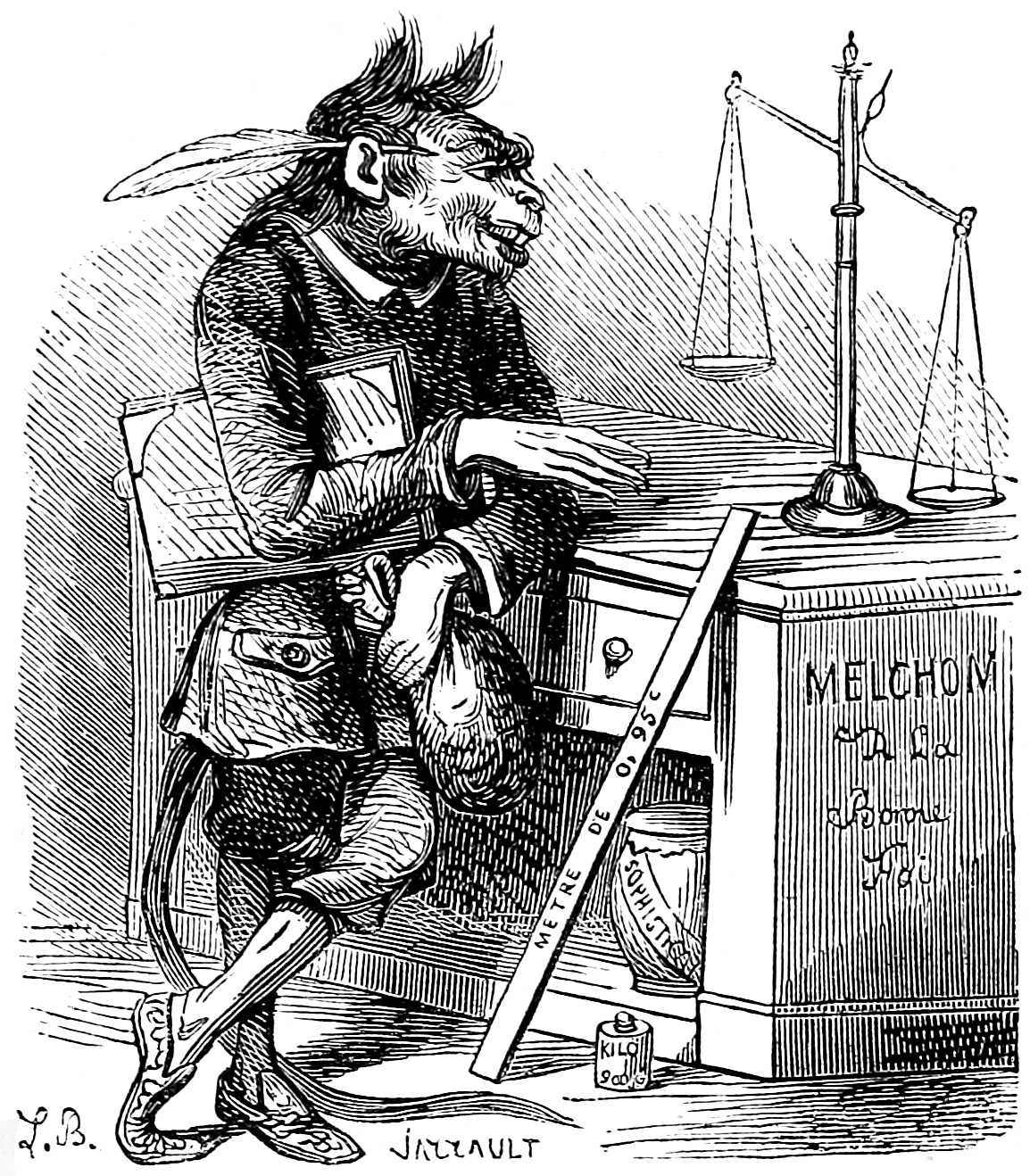
Melchom

Melchom is a demon or spirit in the Dictionnaire Infernal. It is the god or idol of the Ammonites, otherwise called Milcom, Moloch, and Melech: which in Hebrew signifies a king, and Melchom signifies their unearthly king, referring to their unholy idol, Melchom.

The Jamieson-Fausset-Brown Bible Commentary reads:

The Ammonite god is said to do what they do, namely, occupy the Israelite land of Gad. To Jehovah, the theocratic "King" of Israel, the land belonged of right; so that their Molech or Melchom was an usurper-king.

This statement applies that, while the ammonites lived in Gad, so did Melchom. However, after they were chased from there by the Israelites, Melchom was cast down from his idolic throne. This is the moment when Melchom was embodied as a demon after King David "took his crown". In this new form he is a lesser demon, and is the paymaster of servants in hell. He is known as "he who carries the purse".

== See also ==
- Bible
- Josephus
