= Dictionnaire Infernal =

1818 book by Jacques Collin de Plancy

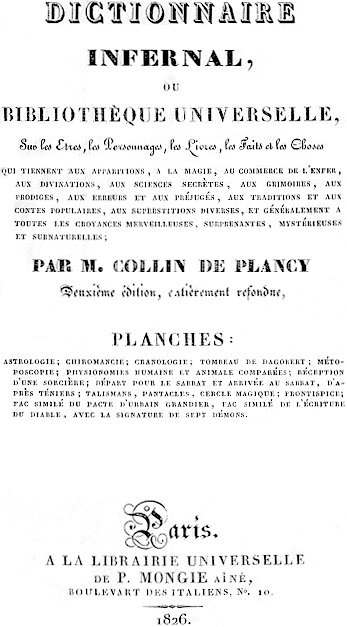
Dictionnaire Infernal

The Dictionnaire Infernal (English: "Infernal Dictionary") is a book on demonology, describing demons organised in hierarchies as well as demonic legends from around the world. It was written by Jacques Collin de Plancy and first published in 1818. There were several editions of the book; perhaps the most famous is the 1863 edition, which included 69 illustrations by Louis Le Breton depicting the appearances of several of the demons. Many but not all of these images were later used in S. L. MacGregor Mathers's edition of The Lesser Key of Solomon.

== History ==
Dictionnaire Infernal was first published in 1818 and then divided into two volumes, with six reprints—and many changes—between 1818 and 1863. This book attempts to provide an account of all the knowledge concerning superstitions and demonology.

Influenced by Voltaire, Collin de Plancy initially did not believe in superstition. For example, the book reassures its contemporaries as to the torments of Hell: "To deny that there are sorrows and rewards after death is to deny the existence of God; since God exists, it must be necessarily so. But only God could know the punishments meted out to the guilty, or the place that holds them. All the catalogues made herebefore are only the fruit of a more or less disordered imagination. Theologians should leave to the poets the depiction of Hell, and not themselves seek to frighten minds with hideous paintings and appalling books" (p. 164).

The skepticism of Collin de Plancy increasingly subsided over time. By the end of 1830 he was an enthusiastic Roman Catholic, to the consternation of his former admirers. In later years, De Plancy rejected and modified his past works, thoroughly revising his Dictionnaire Infernal to conform with Roman Catholic theology. This influence is most clearly seen in the sixth and final 1863 edition of the book, which is decorated with many engravings and seeks to affirm the existence of the demons. De Plancy collaborated with Jacques Paul Migne, a French priest, to complete a Dictionary of the occult sciences or theological Encyclopaedia, which is described as an authentic Roman Catholic work.

Many articles written in the Dictionnaire Infernal illustrate the author's vacillation between rationalism, faith, and willingness to believe without evidence. For example, he admits the possible effectiveness of chiromancy, while rejecting cartomancy: "It is certain that chiromancy, and especially physiognomy, have at least some plausibility: they draw their predictions from signs which relate to features which distinguish and characterize people; of lines which the subjects carry with themselves, which are the work of nature, and that someone can believe significant, since they are unique to each individual. But the cards, merely human artifacts, not knowing either the future, nor the present, nor the past, have nothing of the individuality of the person consulting them. For a thousand different people they will have the same result; and consulted twenty times about the same subject, they will produce twenty contradictory productions" (p. 82).

== List of demons ==
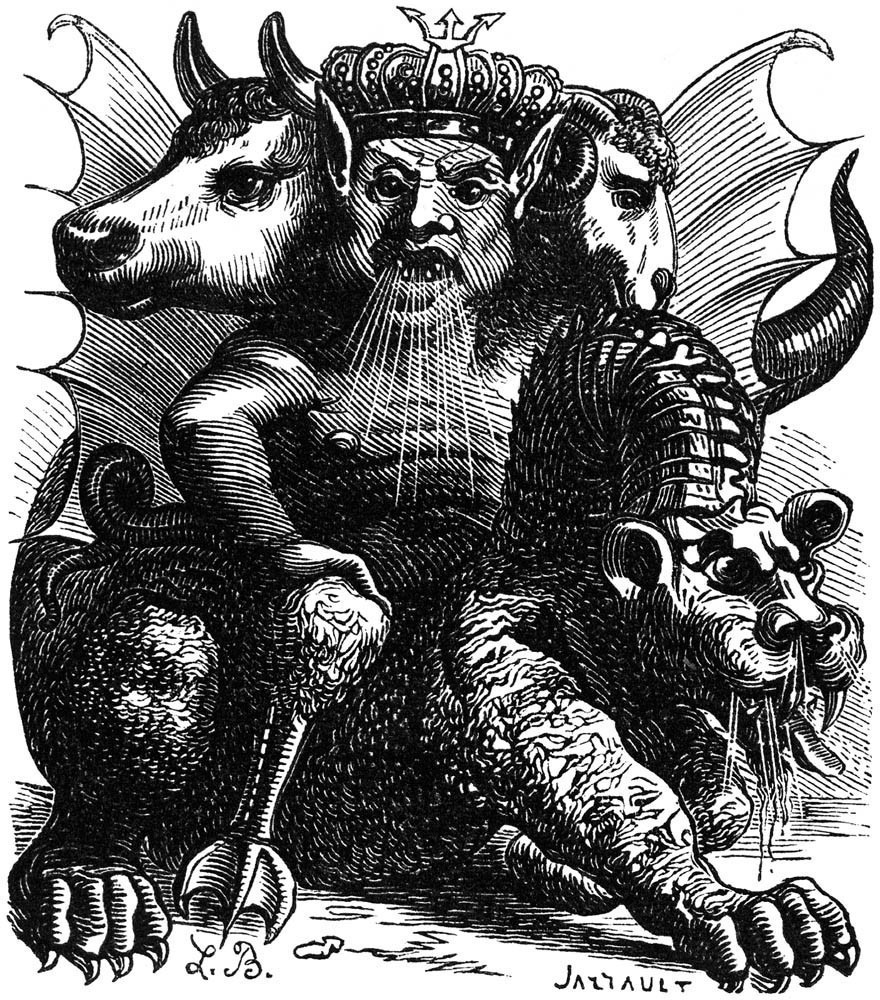
Asmodeus

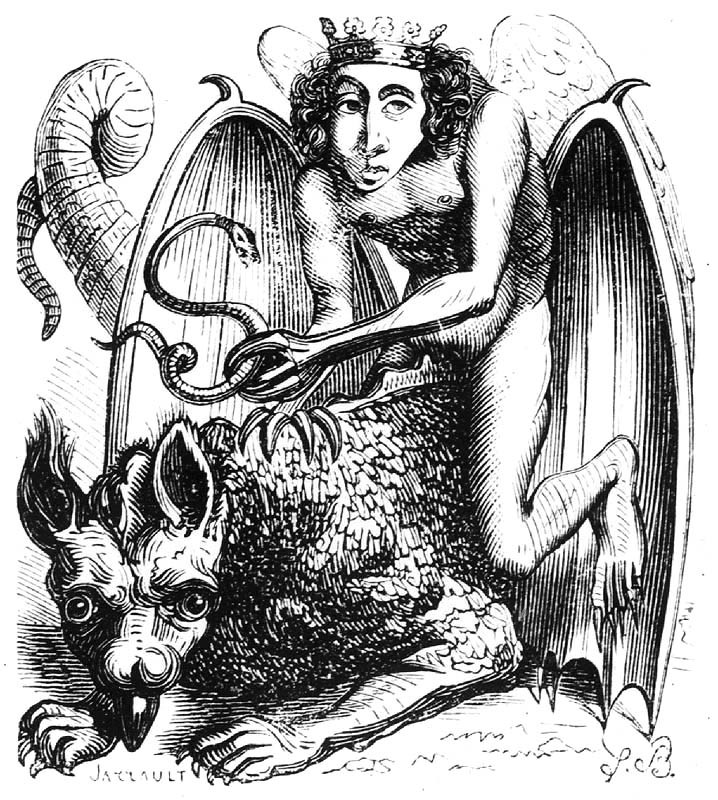
Astaroth

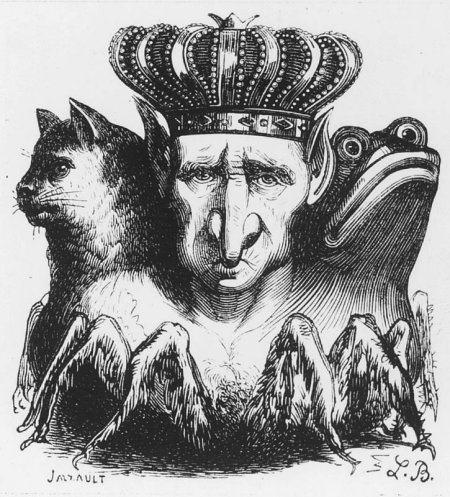
Bael

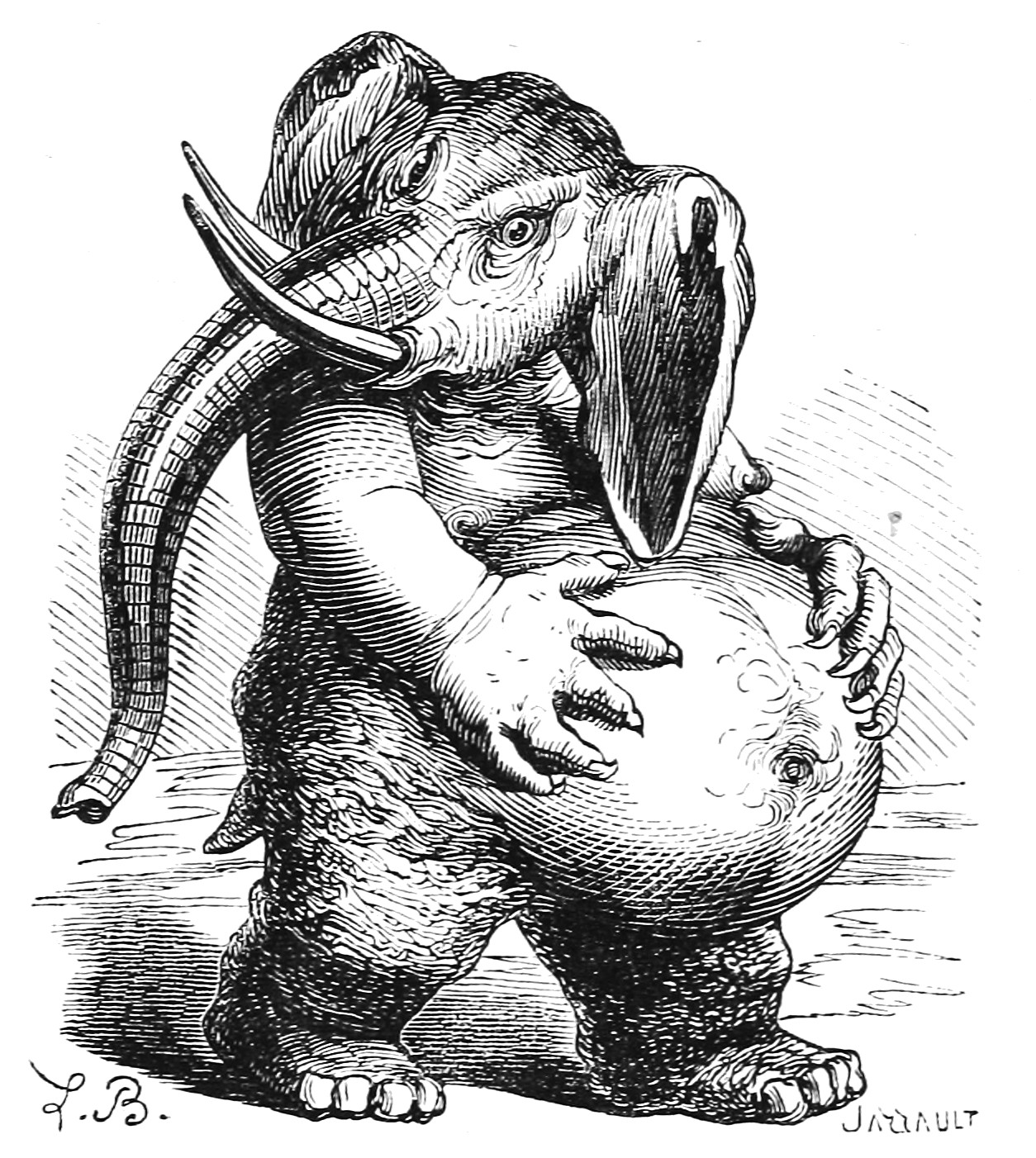
Behemoth

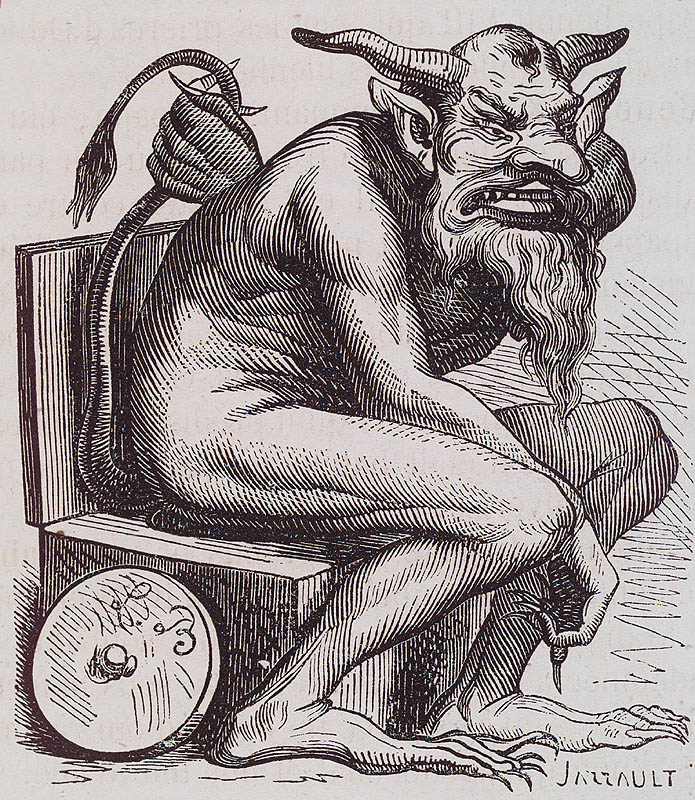
Belphegor

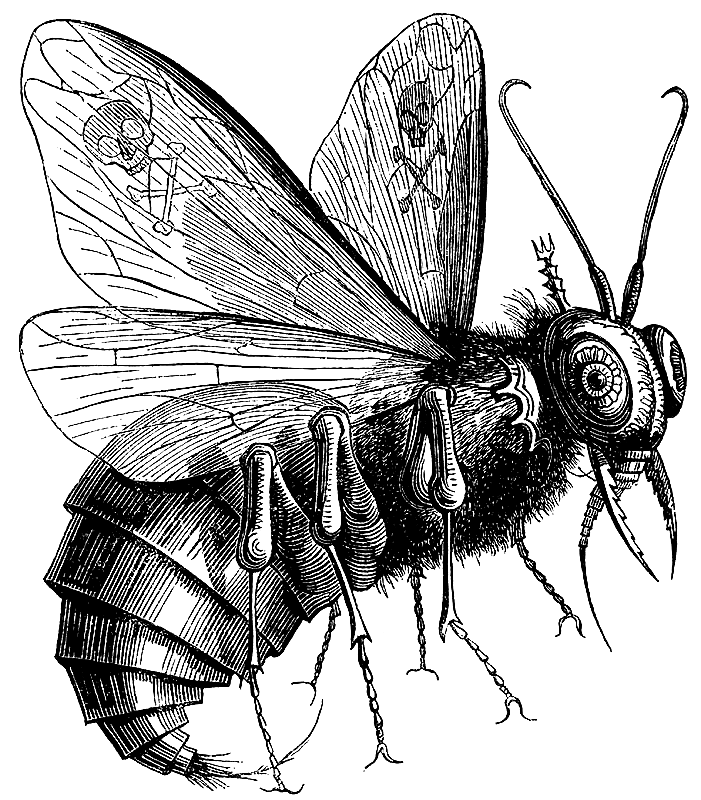
Belzebuth

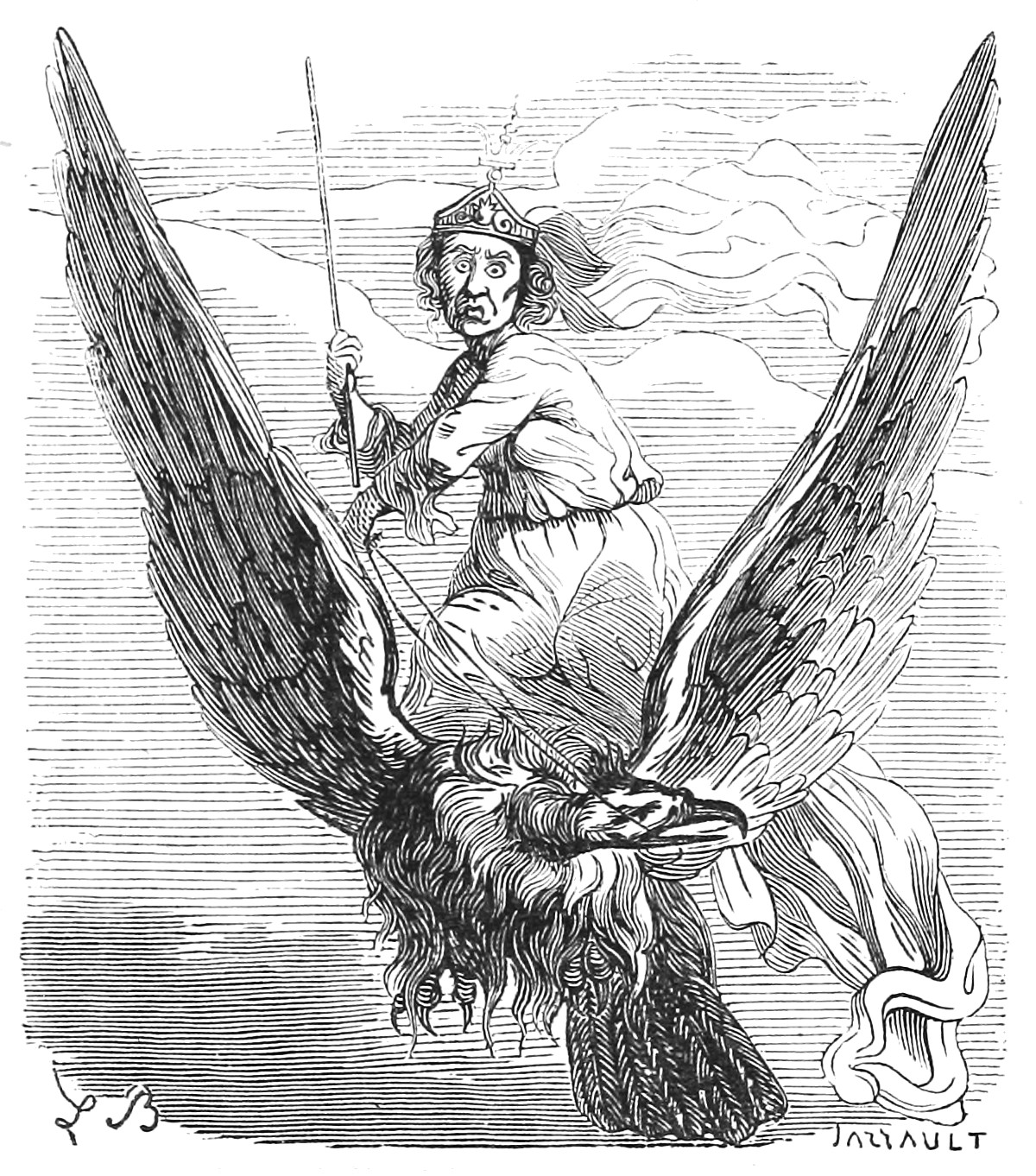
Flaga
1. Abaddon/Apollyon
2. Abigor also known as Eligos
3. Abraxas/Abracas
4. Adramelech
5. Aguares
6. Alastor
7. Alloces
8. Amduscias
9. Aamon
10. Andras
11. Asmodeus
12. Astaroth
13. Azazel
14. Bael
15. Balan
16. Barbatos
17. Behemoth
18. Beleth
19. Belphegor
20. Belzebuth
21. Berith
22. Buer
23. Caacrinolaas
24. Caym
25. Cerbere
26. Deumus
27. Eurynome
28. Flaga
29. Flavros
30. Forcas
31. Furfur
32. Gramma
33. Guayota
34. Gomory
35. Haborym
36. Ipes
37. Cali
38. Lamia
39. Lechies
40. Leonard
41. Lucifer
42. Malphas
43. Mammon
44. Marchosias
45. Melchom
46. Moloch
47. Nickar
48. Nybbas
49. Orobas
50. Paimon
51. Picollus
52. Pruflas/Busas
53. Rahovart
54. Ribesal
55. Ronwe
56. Scox
57. Stolas
58. Tap
59. Torngarsuk
60. Ukobach
61. Volac
62. Wall
63. Xaphan
64. Yan-gant-y-tan
65. Zaebos

== Early editions ==
Contents of the Dictionaire Infernal varied across different early imprints:

- 1818: first edition
- 1825: second edition
- 1826: reprint of second edition
- 1844: third edition
- 1845: fourth edition
- 1853: fifth edition
- 1863: sixth edition, illustrated by Louis le Breton

== See also ==
- Classification of demons
- The Lesser Key of Solomon
- Pseudomonarchia Daemonum
