= Furcas =

Goetic demon

Seal of Furcas (Ars Goetia)

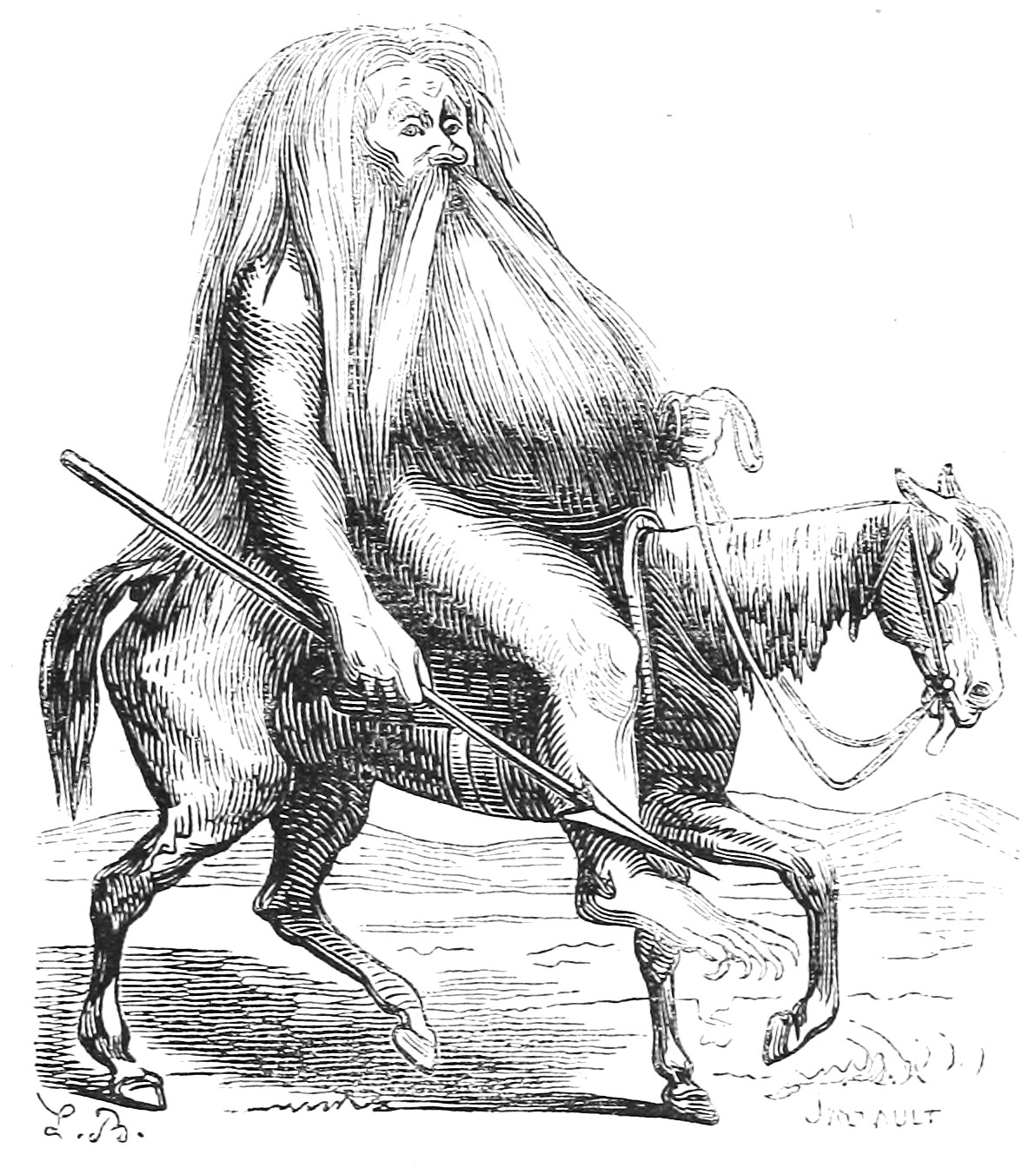
Image of Furcas from Collin de Plancy's Dictionnaire Infernal

In demonology, Furcas (also spelled Forcas) is a knight of hell (the rank of Knight is unique to him), and rules 20 legions of demons. He teaches philosophy, astronomy (astrology to some authors), rhetoric, logic, chiromancy and pyromancy.

Furcas (also known as Ren Vacca) is depicted as a strong old man with white hair and a long white beard, who rides a horse while holding a sharp weapon (pitch fork).

Furcas is a knight and commeth foorth in the similitude of a cruell man, with a long beard and a hoarie head, he sitteth on a pale horse, carrieng in his hand a sharpe weapon, he perfectlie teacheth practike philosophie, rhetorike, logike, astronomie, chiromancie, pyromancie, and their parts: there obeie him twentie legions.

— Johann Weyer (1583)

Notably, the 1563 edition says Forcas is an alias of the demon Foras, but in the 1583 edition of Pseudomonarchia Daemonum, Forcas is established as a unique demon separate from Foras. According to a translation by Joseph H. Peterson:

Foras [*Forras], alias Forcas is a great president, and is seene in the forme of a strong man, and in humane shape, he understandeth the vertue of hearbs and pretious stones: he teacheth fullie logicke, ethicke, and their parts: he maketh a man invisible, wittie, eloquent, and to live long; he recovereth things lost, and discovereth [discloses] treasures, and is lord over nine and twentie legions.

— Johann Weyer (1563)

The etymology of his name may be derived from the Latin word furca, meaning fork, or from Greco-Roman also meaning a sepulchre (tomb).

== In popular culture ==
- Furcas is portrayed as a female teacher with a wide array of magical knowledge in Welcome to Demon School! Iruma-kun.
- Furcas appears as an antagonist in V/H/S/99, portrayed by James C. Morris.

== Sources ==
- MacGregor Mathers, S. L.; Crowley, A. (1995) [1904]. The Goetia: The Lesser Key of Solomon the King. Weiser Books. ISBN 0-87728-847-X.
