= The Cleansing Hour =

2019 American horror film by Damien LeVeck

- Promotional release poster
- Directed by: Damien LeVeck
- Written by: Damien LeVeck; Aaron Horwitz
- Story by: Damien LeVeck
- Produced by: Shirit Bradley; Dan Clifton; Damien LeVeck; Natalie LeVeck; Brad Southwick
- Starring: Ryan Guzman; Kyle Gallner; Alix Angelis; Chris Lew Kum Hoi; Daniel Hoffmann-Gill; Emma Holzer
- Cinematography: Jean-Philippe Bernier
- Edited by: Damien LeVeck
- Music by: Juliette Beavan; Sean Beavan
- Production company: Skubalon
- Distributed by: Shudder
- Release dates: September 16, 2019 (SEFFF); October 8, 2020 (United States)
- Running time: 94 minutes
- Country: United States
- Languages: English; Spanish

The Cleansing Hour is a 2019 American horror film directed by Damien LeVeck about a staged televised exorcism that takes a nefarious turn. The film is a feature length adaptation of a short film by the same name that LeVeck released in 2016.

The Cleansing Hour was released on the streaming service Shudder on October 8, 2020.

== Plot ==
Childhood friends Max and Drew host The Cleansing Hour, a popular livestream show where "Father Max" exorcises a possessed person during each episode. In reality each possession is fake, as they are carefully scripted and orchestrated to entice viewers to like and follow their videos and purchase goods. Max is obsessed with drawing as large a crowd as possible and gaining a bigger following. Drew's fiancée Lane is unhappy but supportive, even going so far as to agree to step in as the possessed person when the actor for their current episode doesn't show.

As the stream starts, it becomes clear that Lane has become truly possessed. The demon kills many of the crew members one by one, eventually leaving just Drew and Max alive. She also forces both of them to confess to every secret he has hidden away. This begins with Max confessing that the show is fake, but as the stream continues he confesses to accidentally murdering a nun while he was a schoolboy. Both he and Drew attended the same Catholic school as children, where they were frequently beaten by a sadistic nun while she castigated them for real or imagined sins. During one particularly bad beating Max killed her in order to save Drew, an experience that scarred and followed him throughout his entire life. He also confesses that he was once a priest, but that he left after witnessing the various abuses of the Catholic priesthood that remained unchecked and unpunished. He then launched the show, thinking that it wouldn't hurt anyone.

As the viewer count rises, Drew realizes that the demon is using the stream for its own purposes and cuts the feed, assuming that its desire is to humiliate the Catholic church. He reconnects the feed after identifying the demon as Aamon using various hints in its speech throughout the stream on a database. The demon then forces one final revelation, that Max and Lane had previously slept together prior to her meeting Drew. This truth almost derails everything, but the rising viewer count causes them to remember to perform the exorcism rites. The demon is driven from Lane, however the entire process has left Max and Drew's friendship shattered. This tenuous peace is short lived, as the demon re-appears in front of the trio to reveal that it tricked them. It was never Aamon, but Lucifer himself, and it possessed Lane in order to gain access to the stream and possess all of the current watchers, which now numbers over 17 million. The possessed viewers attack everyone around them, including the President of the United States by his son, one of the many viewers.

The end credits show all the mayhem caused by the possessed around the world.

== Cast ==
- Ryan Guzman as Max
- Kyle Gallner as Drew
- Alix Angelis as Lane
- Chris Lew Kum Hoi as Chris
- Daniel Hoffmann-Gill as Tommy
- Emma Holzer as Riley
- Joanna David as Schoolmarm
- Ionut Grama as Humberto
- Tara Karsian as Voice of possessed Lane
- Jynarra Brinson as Desiree
- Ana Udroiu as Brenda
- Aaron McVeigh as Young Drew
- Lucas Bond as Young Max
- Sean Hamilton as Bryce
- Abeal Siddiq as Malek
- Shak Gacha as Asad
- Shvan Aladdin as Faiz
- Tiberiu Harsan as Paul

== Release ==
The Cleansing Hour first screened at the Strasbourg European Fantastic Film Festival on September 18, 2019, followed by its official world premiere at Fantastic Fest the next day. The movie went on to screen at several film festivals, including its UK premiere at FrightFest on March 6, 2020.

The film was released on the streaming service Shudder on October 8, 2020.

== Reception ==
Reception for the film has been generally positive and the film holds a rating of 73% on Rotten Tomatoes based on 26 reviews, with an average rating of 5.8/10. Common praise for the film centered on the film's cinematography and the practical effects. Outlets such as Bloody Disgusting, SciFiNow, and Rue Morgue criticized the movie as not bringing enough novel elements to make it stand out from other, similar possession films such as The Exorcist.
