= Nar as-samum =

Islamic term referring to a type of infernal fire

Nār as samūm (Arabic: نار السموم, meaning "fire of poison"; also spelled Simoom or Semum; from the root س م م s-m-m, سم "to poison") is a concept in Islam referring to a type of infernal fire or hot wind. The term is associated with a specific type of storm found in the deserts of the Arabian Peninsula, called simoom. According to the Quran, the damned will be tormented in samūm, and demons are said to be created from samūm.

== Etymology ==
The term Samūm derives from the root s-m-m سم, which means "to poison". It is also used of referring to a hot, dusty desert wind.

In Talmudic and post-Talmudic literature and Bedouins beliefs, the wind of Samum became associated with a demon. Johann Gottfried Eichhorn relates the term to the three days of darkness in Exodus. Accordingly, the darkness comes just with the tempest of Samum.

In Islamic traditions, it is usually interpreted as a kind of fire, which penetrates through the skin of human body in contrast to marijin min nar. However, both fires became usually associated with dangerous spirits.

== Quran and tafsīr ==
The Quran uses the term samūm three times. According to Surah 15:27, al-Jann was created from the fires of samūm (nār as samūm). Surah 56:42 states that "the people of the left hand" (the damned) will suffer from samūm. Surah 52:27 states that God protects from the fires of samūm.

According to Quranic exegesis (tafsīr), samūm is the source from which Iblīs (Satan) and his angels (shayāṭīn) were created. According to ibn Abbas, the good angels were created from "light" (Nūr), Iblīs and his angels from "poisonous fire" (samūm), and the djinn from a "composition of fire" (mārijin min nār).

The exact nature is subject to much discussion. Tabari (839–923) offers many interpretations for the nature of samūm. According to one meaning it is "hot wind which kills" and in another "the flame of the fire of the hot wind" and yet in another he relates it to "night-wind" in opposition to harur (day-wind). Further, he states, some hold samūm to be the hell-fire (nar jahannama).

On the authority of Abu Ubaidah, samūm is the fire that "penetrates the pores due to its fineness in the day-time as well as at night." Abu Sãlih is reported as saying that samūm is smokeless fire located between the heavens and the veil. Tabari concludes, it is the heart of a flame and not wind, as others indicated.

According to Ibn Abbas, the samūm is "the worst hot fire which kills". On the authority of 'Amir ibn Dinar, samūm is the fire of the sun. Cosmographics in the medieval age of Islam usually depicted the sun setting on the gates of hell, and deriving its heat from the fires of hell (i.e. nār as-samūm) during night. On day time, the sun emits the fire of hell over earth. Most mufassirūn repeat the mentioned interpretations, but usually more briefly.

== Adaptations in later religious traditions ==
The name of the Midrashic satanic figure Samael is linguistically related to the term samūm. In Pirke De-Rabbi Eliezer, he is a twelve-winged seraph who refused to prostrate himself before Adam. His depiction might have been influenced by the Islamic portrayal of Iblis who is similarly imagined as an angel related to samūm who refused to bow down before Adam.

Likewise, Manichaeans relate their concept of the Devil, who is also called "Iblīs al-Qadīm" (Iblis without beginning), to the pestilential winds (samūm) in one of the five Kingdoms of darkness.

According to nineteenth-century Orientalist Joseph von Hammer-Purgstall, Ottoman-era legends identify the hot "red wind" Samum as a div (demon) who assisted Satan in his plots against the prophet Solomon.

== Popular culture ==
The 2008 Turkish Horror film Semum, is named after this type of fire. The movie relies on the interpretation of Iblis by ibn Abbas, which depicts Iblis and his tribe as angels dispelled from the presence of God, after they refused to prostrate themselves before Adam. In contrast to Islamic aggadic tradition, these angels/devils are named after the fire of their origin (samūm). The author argues that the meaning of the Quranic term samūm lies in "torment" and these demons "torment the sinners in hell".

== See also ==
- Ghaddar
- Zabaniyya
