= Ratshaker =

2024 British indie horror game

RATSHAKER™
- Developer: Sunscorched Studios
- Engine: Unreal
- Platforms: Steam, Nintendo Switch, PlayStation 5
- Release: 31 October 2024
- Genre: Horror
- Mode: Single-player

Ratshaker (stylised in all caps) is a 2024 indie horror game developed by the London-based Sunscorched Studios with Unreal Engine.

== Release and promotion ==
Ratshaker was released on 31 October 2024, on Steam. In February 2025, the game received an update titled the "New Improved Formula Director's Cut 5 Billion Skinned Alive Deluxe" edition. On 28 May 2025, it was released for PlayStation 5, with the version featuring gyroscopic controls. It later released for the Nintendo Switch, coinciding with the release of a Youtooz of a character in it. It was later removed from its eShop and was unavailable at the release of the Nintendo Switch 2 in North America and Europe.

== Gameplay ==
In Ratshaker, the player is tasked with finding an unidentified 'it' whilst inside a recursive house. The player uses a rat as an energy source by shaking it, which is stored in the "ratshaker meter". The energy is taken from the meter to complete actions. When shaking the rat, it screams in a manner described by Shaun Cichacki of Vice as "Stephen Hawking-esque".

== Reception ==
Ratshaker was the highest-rated game on Steam in 2024, with 95% positive reviews from 2,238 users. Andrew Hamilton and Levi Barner of KWTX-TV rated it a 9/10, saying "the overall atmosphere is tense, but the screaming from the rat as you shake him will have you chuckling to break up the terror". Shaun Cichacki of Vice said "this is art. Surrealism encroaching on the cusp of perfection. A concept that could only be accomplished through the medium of video games".
