= Abezethibou =

Fallen angel described in the Testament of Solomon

Abezethibou is a demon and fallen angel described in the pseudepigrapha, Testament of Solomon. He followed Beelzebub upon his fall from heaven, and became an important demon in Hell. However, after his treason of rebelling against God during the War in Heaven, he is left with one red wing, as his other wing was torn off by angels trying to prevent his fall. In Hell, Abezethibou held a significant position, often acting as a strategist and advisor to Beelzebub. He later traveled to Egypt where he hardened the heart of the Pharaoh and his advisors, convincing them to pursue the fleeing Israelite slaves. This act led to his downfall, as he drowned along with the Egyptian army in the Red Sea and became trapped in a pillar of water. Despite his imprisonment, Beelzebub claims that Abezethibou will return for conquest, hinting at his enduring influence and potential for future chaos. His story has been referenced in various demonological texts and has influenced cultural depictions of fallen angels and demons.

== Depiction in the Testament of Solomon ==
In the Testament of Solomon, when Solomon summons Beelzebub for an interview, the prince of the demons reveals that an angel named Abezethibou accompanied him when he fell from Heaven. After his fall, Abezethibou became a one-winged demon condemned to hell. He claims that all those imprisoned in Tartarus fall under Abezethibou's control. This charge comprised Abezethibou's primary role and burden in the demon world. He opposed Moses and the Israelites during the Exodus from Egypt.

Later, Abezethibou himself appears before Solomon, informing the king that, as an angel, Abezethibou had sat in Amelouth, a place he described as the "first Heaven". After his fall, Abezethibou roamed Egypt, and, after Moses let the Israelites leave Egypt, the Pharaoh became hardened of heart. This is contrary to the traditional Christian view of the event based on the Book of Exodus, which contends that God hardened the heart of the Pharaoh. Abezethibou went with the Egyptian army in the pursuit of the Israelites, and the collapsing Red Sea crushed and drowned him, where he was imprisoned by a pillar of water.

The Testament of Solomon states that Jannes and Jambres called upon Abezethibou when they battled against Moses, and the demon provided them with the magic that they used. He claimed to be "the adversary of Moses in [performing] signs and wonders." Abezethibou was sealed in the Red Sea, but Beelzebub claimed that "when he [Abezethibou] is ready, then he will come in conquest."

== Bibliography ==
- Charlesworth, James (1985). The Old Testament Pseudepigrapha: Apocalyptic Literature and Testaments. Doubleday. ISBN 0-385-09630-5.
- Kugel, James (1998). Traditions of the Bible: A Guide to the Bible As It Was at the Start of the Common Era. Harvard University Press. ISBN 0-674-79151-7.
- Olyan, Saul (1993). A Thousand Thousands Served Him: Exegesis and the Naming of Angels in Ancient Judaism. Mohr Siebeck. ISBN 3-16-146063-4.
- Pietersma, Albert (1994). The Apocryphon of Jannes and Jambres the Magicians (illustrated ed.). Leiden: Brill Publishers. ISBN 90-04-09938-7.
- Webster, Richard (2009). Encyclopedia of Angels. Woodbury, Minnesota: Llewellyn Worldwide. ISBN 978-0-7387-1462-2.
