= Rahovart =

Demon in the Dictionnaire Infernal

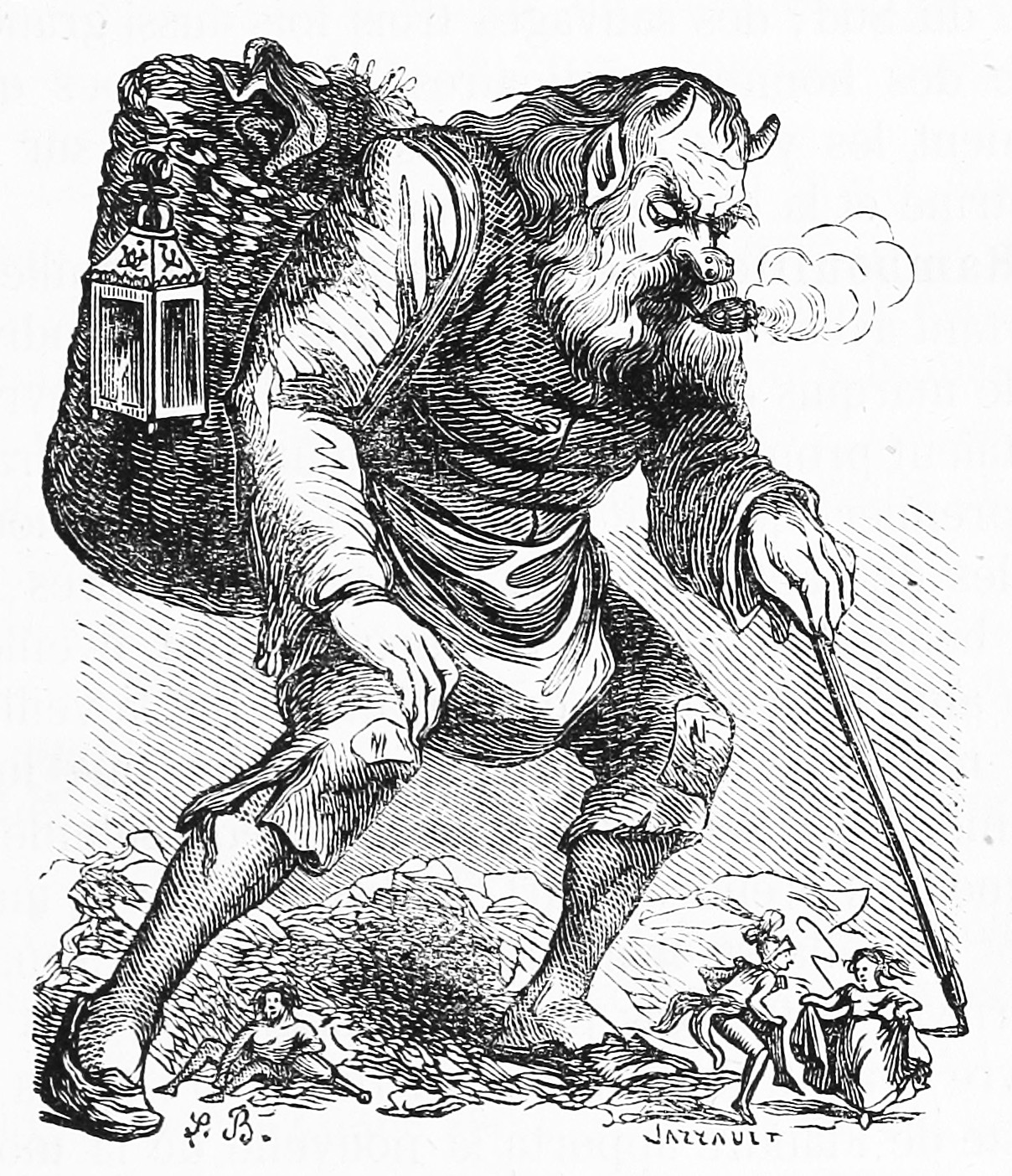
Rahovart

Rahovart (or Rahouart) is a demon identified in Collin de Plancy's Dictionnaire Infernal (1818), according to which he is referenced in Durzel's Moralité, a Renaissance book. Rahovart is a companion of Satan; little is known about the demon himself. In Durzel's undated account (allegedly printed at Rouen), which plays out to the end of the 15th century, Rahovart is attributed to the torment of evil, rich misers and old curmudgeons. He is also charged with avalanches and ghostly torment.

Reportedly, the elderly are most easily subject to possession by this demon, and if the person should die under the demonic effect, their souls are collected into Rahovart's basket until the day of judgment.
