= Barbatos =

Demon

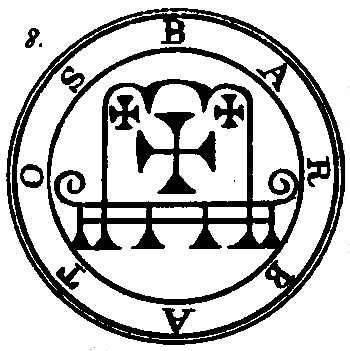
The sigil of Barbatos

Barbatos is the 8th spirit named among the list of 72 demons in The Lesser Key of Solomon. According to grimoire tradition, he holds the rank of Duke, and (like the demon Buer) may appear when the sun is in the sign of Sagittarius. When summoned, he appears "with four noble kings and their companions in great troops". Barbatos grants the ability to understand the spoken language of animals, such as the singing of birds and the barking of dogs. He reveals hidden treasures that have been concealed by the enchantment of magicians, gives knowledge of past and future events, and reconciles disputes between friends and those who hold power. Barbatos has 30 legions of spirits under his command, and once belonged to the angelic order of Virtues.

In the Grand Grimoire, Barbatos is named as the sixth of the eighteen spirits who serve the seven superior spirits, namely, he is under the command of Satanachia along with Pruslas and Aamon.

== In popular culture ==
- In the anime series Mobile Suit Gundam: Iron-Blooded Orphans, the lead mobile suit is known as "ASW-G-08 Gundam Barbatos".
- In the 2020 video game Genshin Impact, Barbatos is one of the names of the Anemo Archon and the tutelary deity of Mondstadt, who appears as Venti.
- In the Japanese otome game Obey Me!, Barbatos is depicted as a butler to the demon prince.
- In the Korean light novel Dungeon Defense, Barbatos appears as one of the 72 Demon Lords and is a major supporting character. Barbatos is depicted as female in this iteration.
- In the DC Comics universe, a character named Barbatos appears as a villain and primeval force of darkness in the Dark Nights: Metal story. Barbatos is worshiped by the Bat Tribe of Gotham City and sends evil alternate versions of Batman from the Dark Multiverse to destroy the multiverse.
- In the strategy game Monster Legends, the monster Barbatos is named after the demon and depicted as the ruler of Hell.
- In the 2022 game Cult of the Lamb, the third miniboss of Darkwood is named after this demon.
- In the Japanese anime and manga series Welcome to Demon School! Iruma-kun, Barbatos Bachiko is the mentor of protagonist Suzuki Iruma.
- In the light novel Omniscient Reader's Viewpoint, Barbatos is the 8th demon king that Jeong Hui-Won that goes by the modifier "Merciless Hunter Against the Will of Heavens".
- In the video game series Shin Megami Tensei, Barbatos shows up as an enemy and a fuseable ally in some games.
- In the Dark Arisen expansion to the videogame Dragon's Dogma 2, Barbatos appears (Along with Satanachia) as a cloaked, magic wielding enemy. A more powerful version of this enemy is named as "Willan Barbatos".
- In the Helluva Boss Season 3 episode "The Auction", Barbatos appears in a flashback as the master tutoring Stolas and Vassago in the arcane arts.
- An enemy type named Barbatos appears in the video game Final Fantasy X
