= Adrammelech =

Ancient Semitic god

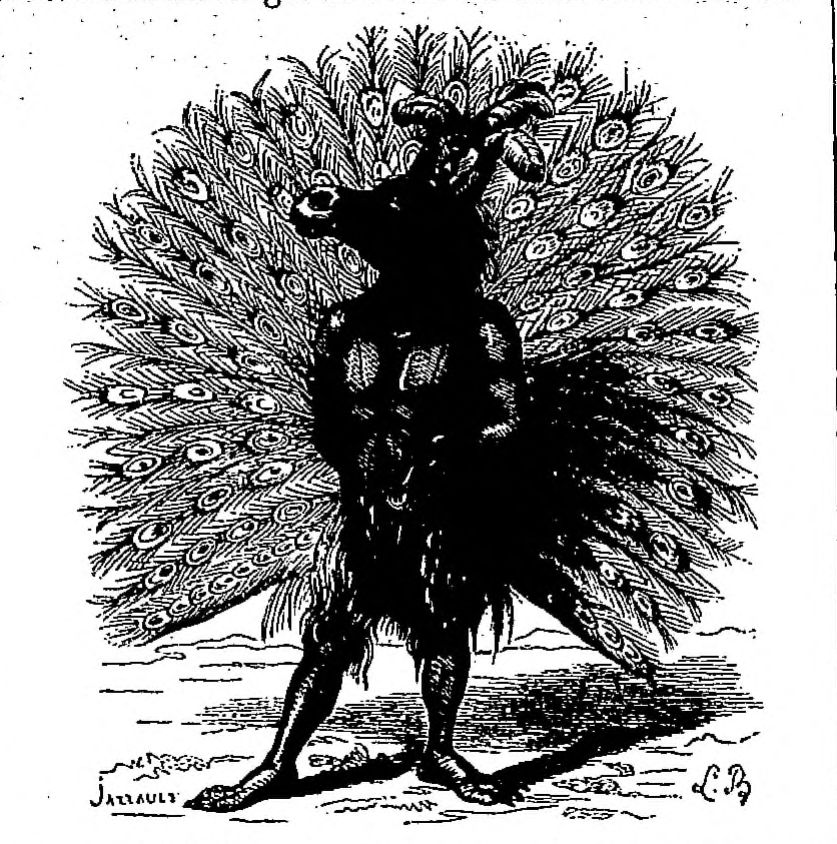
Depiction of Adrammelech, from Collin de Plancy's Dictionnaire Infernal, 1863

Adrammelech /əˈdræməˌlɛk/ (Biblical Hebrew: אַדְרַמֶּלֶךְ, romanized: ʾAḏrammeleḵ; Koine Greek: Ἀδραμέλεχ Adramélekh) is an ancient Semitic god mentioned briefly by name in the Book of Kings, where he is described as a god of "Sepharvaim". Sepharvaim (a word which is grammatically dual) is commonly, but not certainly, identified with the twin cities of Sippar Yahrurum and Sippar Amnanum on the banks of the Euphrates, north of Babylon. The name Adrammelech probably translates to "Magnificent king."

The Adrammelech mentioned in 2 Kings 19:37 as one of the sons and murderers of Sennacherib refers to an unrelated human figure, historically known as Arda-Mulissu.

== Historical background ==
=== Biblical account ===
2 Kings 17:31 reports: "The Sepharvites burned their children in the fire as sacrifices to Adrammelech and Anammelech, the gods of Sepharvaim" (NIV). The Sepharvites are given as a people deported by the Assyrians to Samaria. Adrammelech and the god Anammelech (about whom likewise little is known) are again seemingly alluded to in 2 Kings 18:34: "Where are the gods of Hamath and Arpad? Where are the gods of Sepharvaim, Hena and Ivvah? Have they rescued Samaria from my hand?" (NIV). Isaiah 36:19 has an almost identical passage.

=== Interpretation ===
According to A. R. Millard, Saul Olyan, and others, Adrammelech likely represents an original *ʾAddîr-meleḵ, "majestic king" or "the majestic one is king". Cognate ʾAddîr-milk, along with similar Milk-ʾaddîr (with the morphemes inverted) and Baʿal-ʾaddîr ("majestic master" or "majestic Baal"), is recorded in ancient Semitic sources as an epithet of Baal, or a baal.

Adrammelech is commonly understood as a companion of Anammelech, due to their association in 2 Kings 17, the similarity of their names, and the similarity of their worship through child sacrifice.

Before the identification with epigraphic ʾAddîr-milk, various attempts (since generally rejected) were made to interpret the origin of the name Adrammelech.

The reconstructed form *Adar-malik (or the variant *Adru-malku) was once almost universally accepted as the original Akkadian form of the name. For example, Eberhard Schrader wrote in 1885:

"Adrammelech means 'Adar is prince'. It […] was pronounced in Assyrian Adar-malik (Assyr.-Babylon. Keilinsch., selected proper names no. 33a p. 140). [...] Both Adar and Anu, Anuv are very frequently mentioned deities of Assyria. Adar, originally pronounced A-tar, is a word of Akkadian origin and means 'father of decision'. It resembles Nam-tar (literally 'decision, destiny, destination', likewise name of the 'plague-god')."

Peter Jensen proposed in the late nineteenth century that אדרמלך (ʾAḏrammeleḵ, "Adrammelech") was a manuscript error for *אדדמלך (*ʾĂḏaḏmeleḵ, "*Adadmelech"), due to the typographical similarity of ר (r) and ד (d), which Jensen thought was a variant of unrecorded *חֲדַדמֶּלֶךְ (*Ḥăḏaḏmeleḵ, "King Hadad" or "Hadad is king"), thus identifying Adrammelech with the Canaanite god Hadad. Adad is in fact recorded as a variant of Hadad; but Millard writes: "If the Sepharvites were of Aramean or Phoenician origin, it is very unlikely that the name of their god would have lost its initial h, unless the Hebrew authors of Kings copied the information from a cuneiform text in Babylonian, which would not express it."

At the turn of the century, William Muss-Arnolt suggested that ʾAḏrammeleḵ could represent his own reconstructed Akkadian *Atra-malik, comparing the form to the names Atra-ḫasis and *(A)tar-ilu, writing, "Atra-malik would probably yield אדרמלךְ."

== In the Talmud ==
From the Jewish Encyclopedia:

The Talmud teaches (Sanh. 63b) that Adrammelech was an idol of the Sepharvaim in the shape of an ass. This is to be concluded from his name, which is compounded of אדר "to carry" (compare Syriac אדרי), and מלך "a king." These heathens worshiped as God the same animal which carried their burdens (Sanh. l.c.; see also Rashi's explanation of this passage which interprets אדר "to distinguish," by "carrying"). Still another explanation of the name ascribes to the god the form of a peacock and derives the name from adar ("magnificent") and melek ("king"); Yer. 'Ab. Zarah, iii. 42d.

== Demonology ==
Like many pagan gods, Adrammelech is considered a demon in some Judeo-Christian traditions. According to Collin de Plancy's book on demonology, Infernal Dictionary, Adrammelech became the President of the Senate of the demons. He is also the Chancellor of Hell and supervisor of Satan's wardrobe. He is generally depicted with a human torso, a mule's head, a peacock tail, and the limbs of a mule or peacock. In the Ars Goetia, he was known as Andrealphus.

== In fiction ==
He appears in Milton's Paradise Lost, where he is a fallen angel who, along with Asmodeus, is vanquished by Uriel and Raphael.

A poet's description of Adrammelech (spelled Adramelech as in Greek) can be found in Robert Silverberg's short story "Basileus". He is described as "The enemy of God, greater in ambition, guile and mischief than Satan. A fiend more curst—a deeper hypocrite."

An attempt to summon Adrammelech (spelled Adramelech throughout) is central to the plot of Graham Masterton's 1978 horror novel "The Devils of D Day".

He appears as an enemy in the video game Shin Megami Tensei IV: Apocalypse, being the first boss of said video game and is fought again later on.

He appears as a character in the manga series Black Clover as a high-ranking devil.

== See also ==
- Anammelech
- Baal
- Christian demons in popular culture
- List of biblical figures identified in extra-biblical sources
