= Malphas =

President of Hell in demonology

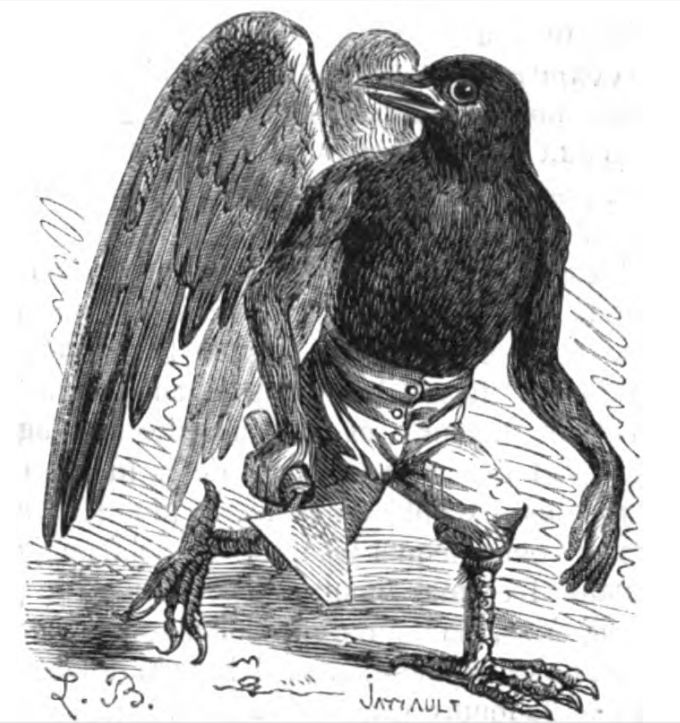
Malphas, by Louis Le Breton, 1863

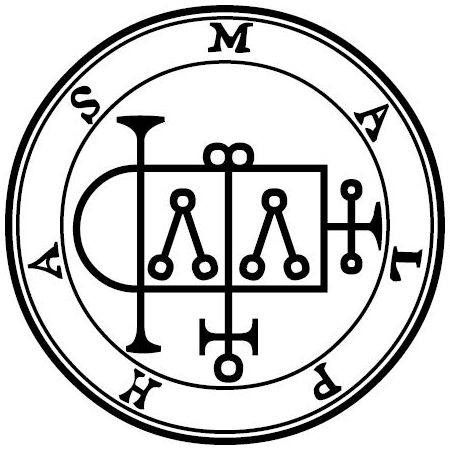
Sigil of Malphas

In demonology, Malphas is a demon who first appears in Johann Weyer's Pseudomonarchia Daemonum. That work and the Lesser Key of Solomon describe him as a mighty Great President of Hell, with 40 legions of demons under his command and is second in command under Satan. He appears as a raven, but if requested, will instead resemble a man with a hoarse voice. Malphas is said to build houses, high towers and strongholds, throw down the buildings of enemies, destroy enemies' desires or thoughts (and/or make them known to the conjurer) and all that they have done, give good familiars, and quickly bring artificers together from all places of the world. According to the writers, Malphas accepts willingly and kindly any sacrifice offered to him, but then he will allegedly deceive the conjurer.

== In popular culture ==
- Malphas appears as the main antagonist in the game Diablo IV, for the third season of the game “The Season of the Construct“.
- Malphas is one of the demons in Devil May Cry 5.
- Malphas is an infernal demon from Inferno appearing in Bayonetta 1 and Bayonetta 3. It is also mentioned in Bayonetta 2.
- The sigil of Malphas can be seen on the ground in the game Ratshaker, in the final room.
- Malphas appears as an antagonist in the indie game Faith: The Unholy Trinity
- Malphas is a recurring demon in the Shin Megami Tensei series.
- In the Castlevania series, Malphas is a recurrent demon.
- In the game Savage 2: A Tortured Soul, Malphas is a particularly strong Hellbourne unit, obtained at a Hellshrine at a cost of 20 enemy souls.
- Malphas (Marphos) appears in season 1 episode 3 of the 2025 TV series The Bondsman starring Kevin Bacon.
- A Voidsent named Malphas appears in Final Fantasy XIV as the last boss of The Clyteum dungeon.

== See also ==
- The Lesser Key of Solomon

== Sources ==
- S. L. MacGregor Mathers, A. Crowley, The Goetia: The Lesser Key of Solomon the King (1904). 1995 reprint: ISBN 0-87728-847-X.
