= O Tokata =

Spirit of the dead in mythology of Tobelo, Indonesia

O Tokata is a spirit of the dead in the mythology of Tobelo, Halmahera Island, North Maluku province, Indonesia.

== Description ==
O tokata is a malevolent spirit of the dead which has become dangerous as a result of its incomplete transformation into an ancestor spirit. According to traditional belief of Maluku people, there are two types of O tokata:

- O tokata o honganino. It comes from the forest and causes people to have nightmares, bad humor and to affect their legs. In order to protect themselves from this spirit, people sleep with their heads pointing inland.
- O tokata o tonakino is a spirit coming from the ground.

Following the sectarian conflict that took place in Tobelo in 1999–2000 between the Christians and the Muslims, a vengeful female spirit that appeared four years later in the area was named Suanggi and was identified with O Tokata.

== See also ==
- Folklore of Indonesia
- Suanggi
- Tobelo
