= Yan-gant-y-tan =

Demon from Brittany, France

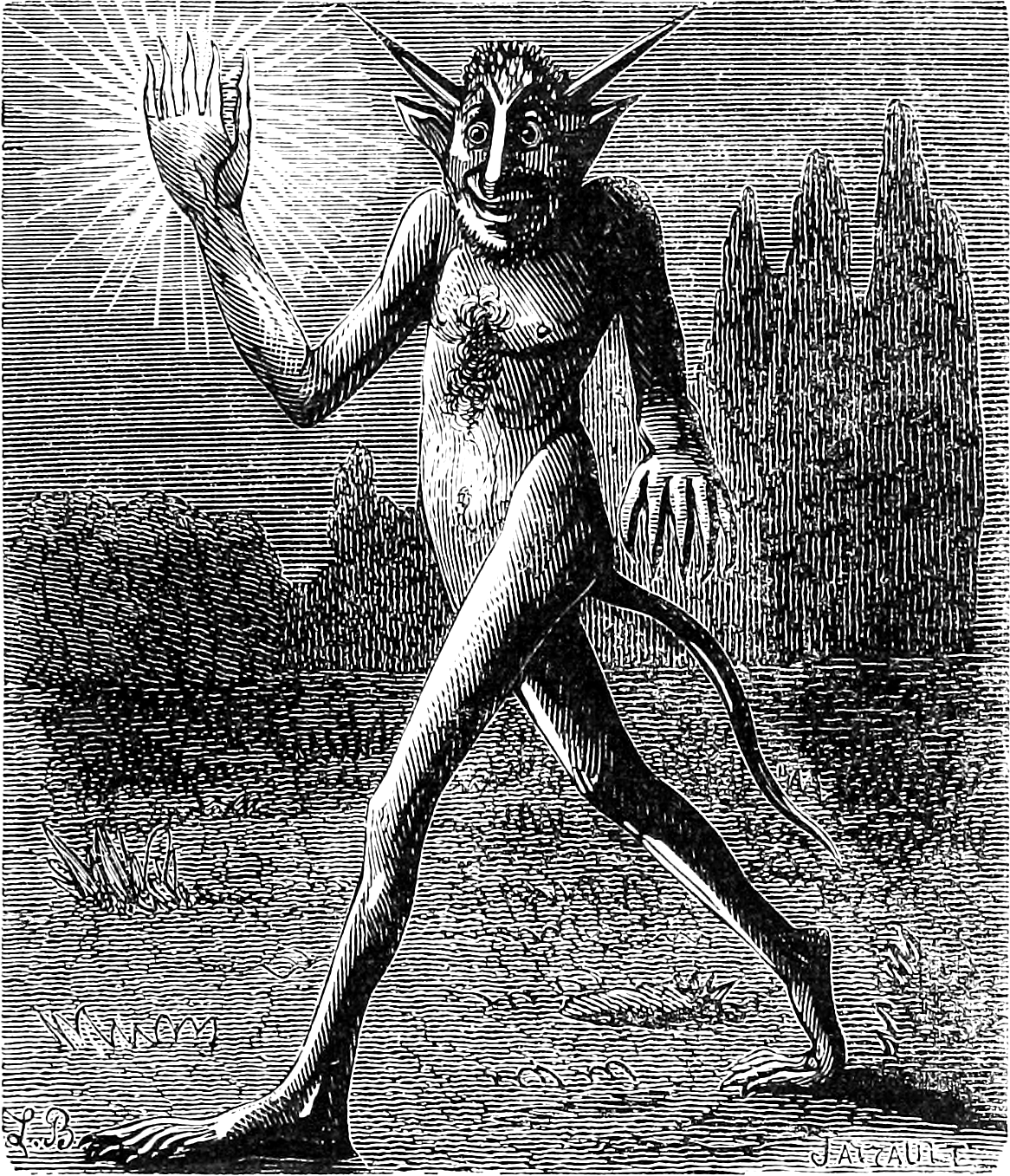
Yan-gant-y-tan in the Dictionnaire Infernal, 1863.

Yan-gant-y-tan is the name of a demon from Brittany, France.

== Etymology ==
Collin de Plancy, in the Dictionnaire Infernal, gives the meaning of his name as 'Wanderer in the Night', but the translation of his name from Breton seems to be cognate to 'John with the Fire' (compare Will o' the Wisp). Meeting him is said to be an evil omen.

== Appearance in folklore ==
Yan-gant-y-tan wanders the nights in Finistère. He holds five candles on the five fingers of his right hand (compare Hand of Glory) and spins them about like a flaming wheel, as a result of which he is unable to turn quickly for fear of extinguishing their light. A sure way to ward off the bad omen of Yan-gant-y-tan is to leave a small bag of gold or of gold chain around a travelers post which Yan-gant-y-tan will steal and leave the house for another day. He is often depicted as a wiry old troll or hairy wildman, but the only way to distinguish him from other such creatures is the 5 candles upon his hand. In contrast to his nature as a bad omen it is said that he may appear and give five candles to a person who has none, thus lighting the way for a traveller the rest of the night.

== See also ==
- Google book hit in French. Dictionnaire ... des pèlerinages anciens et modernes, par L. de Sivry.
