= Dzoavits =

Demon or ogre from Shoshonean mythology

Dzoavits was a demon or ogre from Shoshonean mythology who stole the sun and kidnapped children. He is associated with volcanism and cannibalism. In most legends he confronts several mythological animals before being trapped in a cave, the most common one being Devils Hole.
