= Suanggi =

Spirit in Indonesian folklore

Suanggi or Suangi, also known as keswange or iwangi, is a malevolent spirit in the folklore of many regions in Eastern Indonesia.

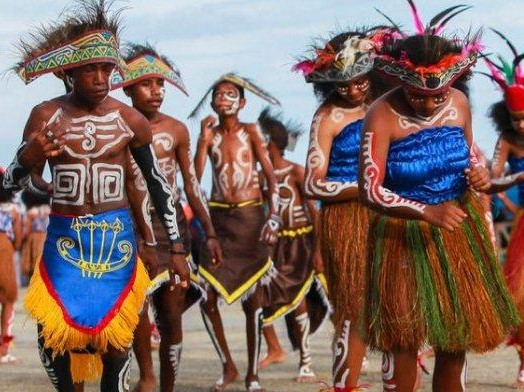
Suanggi dance used to exorcise the evil spirits, from Waropen, Papua

== Etymology ==
Suanggi (also keswange or iwangi) is believed to be derived from Greater Central Philippine *aswang ("vampire," "evil spirit," or "witch"). Its cognates include Cebuano, Aklanon, Bikol, and Kapampangan aswang; Tagalog aswang, asuwang, or uswang; Maranao ansoang ("demon witch"); Mansaka asoang ("demon"); and Sangir ansuang ("giant").

== Description ==
According to W. R. van Hoëvell, Suanggi is an evil spirit in the shape a person having magical power to cause disease and illness. Suanggi is also a Moluccan Malay term for villagers suspected of being cannibal witches. The accusation of being a Suanggi would be fatal, for those who were allegedly proven to be a Suanggi would be killed and their corpses would be thrown into the sea.

=== Suanggi and the Tobelo events ===
Following the 1999–2000 sectarian conflict that took place in Tobelo, a town and a district in the island of Halmahera, a malevolent female spirit that was rumored to have appeared later in that area was named Suanggi. The spirit manifested itself in February 2004 in the form of a young woman, haunting the Tobelo area for about two months. It was an allegedly unconventional form of Suanggi that was identified with O Tokata, a local malevolent spirit. Suanggi appeared as a beautiful woman that enticed young men, particularly teachers. When the man agreed to have sex with her she would attack him and devour his genitals. The presence of the spirit created an atmosphere of fear not only in Tobelo but at other places of North Maluku as well. Villagers, particularly the children, were forbidden to go outside their homes in the night.

It was claimed that this Suanggi was the vengeful ghost of a Muslim girl seeking retribution against her attackers. The young woman had been the daughter of a Tobelo village leader and she had been raped and brutally murdered by a group of young men during the 1999–2000 riots in the town. After her death her whereabouts were unknown, but six months later the location of her body lying in a ravine was revealed to a diviner in a dream. When her mortal remains were found in that location, a formal burial ceremony was performed. It was believed that the spirit of this girl had assumed a revengeful form motivated by trauma.

Later in 2004, during the first national election in Eastern Indonesia, a local Christian farmer heard the loud wailing cries of a woman near his plantation. He claimed that they came from the bloodthirsty spirit Suanggi "as if she was crying into a megaphone", similar to the loud speakers widely used in Tobelo during the election campaign. The place where the cries were heard was the precise location where large massacres had taken place during the 1999–2000 riots between the Christians and the Muslims in which more than 800 people were killed.

== Suanggi outside Maluku ==
Suanggi beliefs exist in Maluku's neighboring province of East Nusa Tenggara. In 2010-2011, two houses were destroyed by mobs in Adonara, East Flores Regency, due to the occupants being believed to be suanggi. The East Nusa Tenggara Tourism Office plans to coordinate a race for suanggi to fly as one of the events related to Expo Alor 2019.

== See also ==
- Folklore of Indonesia
- O Tokata
- Tobelo
- Vengeful ghost
- Aswang
