= Shudder =

Shudder may refer to:

- Shivering
- Shudder (album), a 2008 album by American band Bayside
- Shudder Mountain, a mountain in Canada
- Shudder (streaming service), a subscription-based horror streaming service
- "Shudder", a guitar intro to the song "King of Snakes" by Underworld taken from the 1999 album Beaucoup Fish
