= Anammelech =

Syrian and Mesopotamian deity

Anammelech (Hebrew: עֲנַמֶּלֶךְ ʿAnammelekh), according to the Hebrew Bible, was a Syrian and Mesopotamian deity worshipped alongside Adrammelech. He is a lunar deity and is said to have been worshipped at Sepharvaim, an Assyrian town. Although some scholars have related him to the Mesopotamian god Anu based on the belief that his name means "Anu is king", more recent scholarship understands the initial element of the name represents the masculine counterpart of the goddess Anat, as attested in Amorite personal names.
