= Testament of Solomon =

Pseudepigraphical work ascribed to Solomon

The Testament of Solomon is a pseudepigraphical composite text ascribed to King Solomon but not regarded as canonical scripture by Jews or Christian groups. It was written in the Greek language, based on precedents dating back to the early 1st millennium AD, but was likely not completed in any meaningful textual sense until sometime in the Middle Ages. In its most noteworthy recensions, the text describes how Solomon was enabled to build his temple by commanding demons by means of a magical ring that was entrusted to him by the archangel Michael.

== Dating and authorship ==
Scholarly opinion on when the Testament of Solomon was written varies widely. Suggested dates for its composition range between the end of the 1st century AD and the High Middle Ages. Also disputed is whether it had a Christian or Jewish origin. Mid-twentieth century scholarship tended to agree that much of its content "reflects the first-century Judaism in Israel" and includes material much earlier than its composition. However, scholars both before (e.g., Istrin) and after (e.g., Schwarz) proposed other solutions based upon the varied manuscript evidence. Because of the text's various forms, produced over centuries by distinct scribes, the author or authors of the text remain unknown. The text was originally written in Greek and contains numerous theological and magical themes ranging from Christianity and Judaism to Greek mythology and astrology that possibly hint at a Christian writer with a Greek background.

== Contents ==
When a demon named Ornias harasses a young man (who is favored by Solomon) by stealing half of his pay and sucking out his vitality through the thumb on his right hand, Solomon prays in the temple and receives from the archangel Michael a magic ring which enables him to command the demons. Solomon has the young man throw the ring at the demon Ornias, which stamps him with the seal and brings him under control. Then Solomon orders the demon Ornias to take the ring and similarly imprint the prince of demons, Beelzebul.

With Beelzebul under his command, Solomon now has all of the demons at his bidding to build the temple. Beelzebul reveals that he was formerly the highest ranking angel in Heaven.

In chapter 18, the demons of the 36 decans appear, with names that sometimes seem to be conscious distortions of the traditional names for the decans. The decan demons claim responsibility mostly for various ailments and pains, and they provide the magical formulae by which they may be banished. For example, the thirty-third demon is Rhyx Achoneoth who causes sore throat and tonsillitis and can be driven off by writing the word Lycourgos on ivy leaves and heaping them into a pile.

Solomon's final demon encounter involves sending a servant boy with his ring to take captive a wind demon who is harassing the land of Arabia. The boy is to hold a wineskin against the wind with the ring in front of it, and then tie up the bag when it is full. The boy succeeds in his task and returns with the wineskin. The imprisoned demon calls himself Ephippas, and it is by his power that a cornerstone, thought to be too large to lift, is raised into the entrance of the temple.

Then Ephippas and another demon from the Red Sea bring a miraculous column made of something purple (translation obscure) from out of the Red Sea. This Red Sea demon reveals himself as Abezethibou, and claims to be the demon who supported the Egyptian magicians against Moses, and who hardened the pharaoh's heart, but had been caught with the Egyptian host when the sea returned and held down by this pillar until Ephippas came and together they could lift it.

There follows a short conclusion in which Solomon describes how he fell in love with a Shunammite woman, and agreed to worship Remphan and Moloch in exchange for sex. Solomon agrees to sacrifice to them, but at first only sacrifices five locusts by simply crushing them in his hand. Immediately, the spirit of God departs from him, and he is made foolish and his name becomes a joke to both humans and demons. Solomon concludes his text with a warning to the readers; he tells them to not abandon their beliefs for sex like he did.

== Cosmology ==
In the Testament of Solomon, the firmament is conceived in a tripartite structure and demons are portrayed as being capable of flying up to and past the firmament in order to eavesdrop on the decisions of God.

== Christian themes ==
The most explicit and notable Christian theme found in the text was during King Solomon's encounter with the demon Ephippas. While working on the temple, Solomon asks Ephippas by what angel he is thwarted. The demon replied that the only thing that can truly take away his powers and defeat him is a man that will be born of a virgin and then be crucified on a cross by the Jews.

== Greek influence ==
The most obvious Greek influence is Solomon's encounter with seven demons who are sisters. They introduce themselves to the king and describe their home among the stars and Mount Olympus. The seven demon-sisters represent the Pleiades of Greek mythology and their astrological relationship.

Solomon also encounters a female demon called Obizuth, who has no limbs and a head full of disheveled hair. It is argued that she actually represents Medusa or a gorgon-like creature from Greek mythology.

The demon Enepsigos recounts to King Solomon at one point during the temple's construction that he can take three different physical forms, one of which being the Greek Titan Kronos. Enepsigos is also represented as a triple-faced woman akin to Hecate and is likewise astrologically associated with the sphere of the moon.

== Similarity to Jewish tradition ==
The Babylonian Talmud (in Gittin 68) mentions a similar story where Solomon enslaves Ashmedai, a demon prince, to build the Temple.

== Demons ==
Many of the demons in Solomon's encounters are of Greek, Egyptian, Jewish, Christian, Arabic, and other traditions. The majority of the testament consists of Solomon's interviews with the demons, some of which are grotesque, including one which has no head. Two demons associated strongly with sexuality appear among them- Asmodeus from the Book of Tobit, and a female demon named Obyzouth, who has similarities to Lilith, such as killing newborn children. Most of the other demons are otherwise unknown by name from other works. The demon Abezethibou is said to have hardened the pharaoh's heart, rather than God.

The demons, listed in order of appearance, are Ornias, Beelzebub, Onoskelis, Asmodeus, Tephras, the 7 star sisters (a reference to the Pleiades), Envy, Rabdos, Rath, Tribolaios, Obizuth, the wingdragon, Enêpsigos, Kunopaston, an unnamed "lustful spirit", the 36 spirits of the decans, Ephippas, Abezethibou.

== See also ==
- Classification of demons
- Demonology
- Key of Solomon
- Lesser Key of Solomon
- Literary forgery
- Magic
- Solomon and Marcolf
- Temple of Solomon
- Canon Alberic's Scrap-Book

== Bibliography ==
- Text
  - F. F. Fleck, Wissenschaftliche Reise durch das südliche Deutschland, Italien, Sicilien und Frankreick, II.iii (Leipzig, 1837), pp. 111–140. (Available in reprint in Patrologia Graeca, ed. J. P. Migne, 1315–1358, together with a Latin translation.)
  - C. C. McCown, The Testament of Solomon, edited from manuscripts at Mount Athos, Bologna, Holkham Hall, Jerusalem, London, Milan, Paris and Vienna, with Introduction (Untersuchungen zum Neuen Testament, Heft 9; Leipzig, 1922. (The standard critical edition.))
- English translations
  - "The Testament of Solomon", trans. F. C. Conybeare, Jewish Quarterly Review, October, 1898 (English translation.)
  - "Testament of Solomon", trans. D. C. Duling, in The Old Testament Pseudepigrapha, Volume 1 (Doubleday; New York, 1983). ISBN 0-385-09630-5
  - "The Testament of Solomon", trans. M. Whittaker, in The Apocryphal Old Testament, ed. H. F. D. Sparks (Clarendon Press; Oxford, 1984). ISBN 0-19-826166-7 (hbk) ISBN 0-19-826177-2 (pbk)
- Commentary
  - James Harding and Loveday Alexander, "Dating the Testament of Solomon", May, 1999 (A discussion of the source manuscripts and possible dating.)
  - Amy Scerba, "The Testament of Solomon – circa 200 CE (Part of history of the character of Lilith.)
  - Commentary by M. R. James
    - "The Testament of Solomon", reprinted from the Guardian Church Newspaper, March 15, 1899, p.367
    - "Solomon and the Demons", extracted from Old Testament Legends (Longmans, Green and Co., 1913)
    - "Review of The Testament of Solomon from the Journal of Theological Studies, Vol.24, 1923, pp.467–68
