= Aamon =

Demon governor to 40 infernal legions

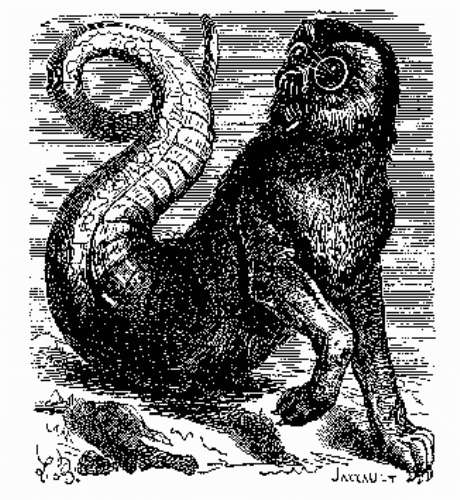
Aamon

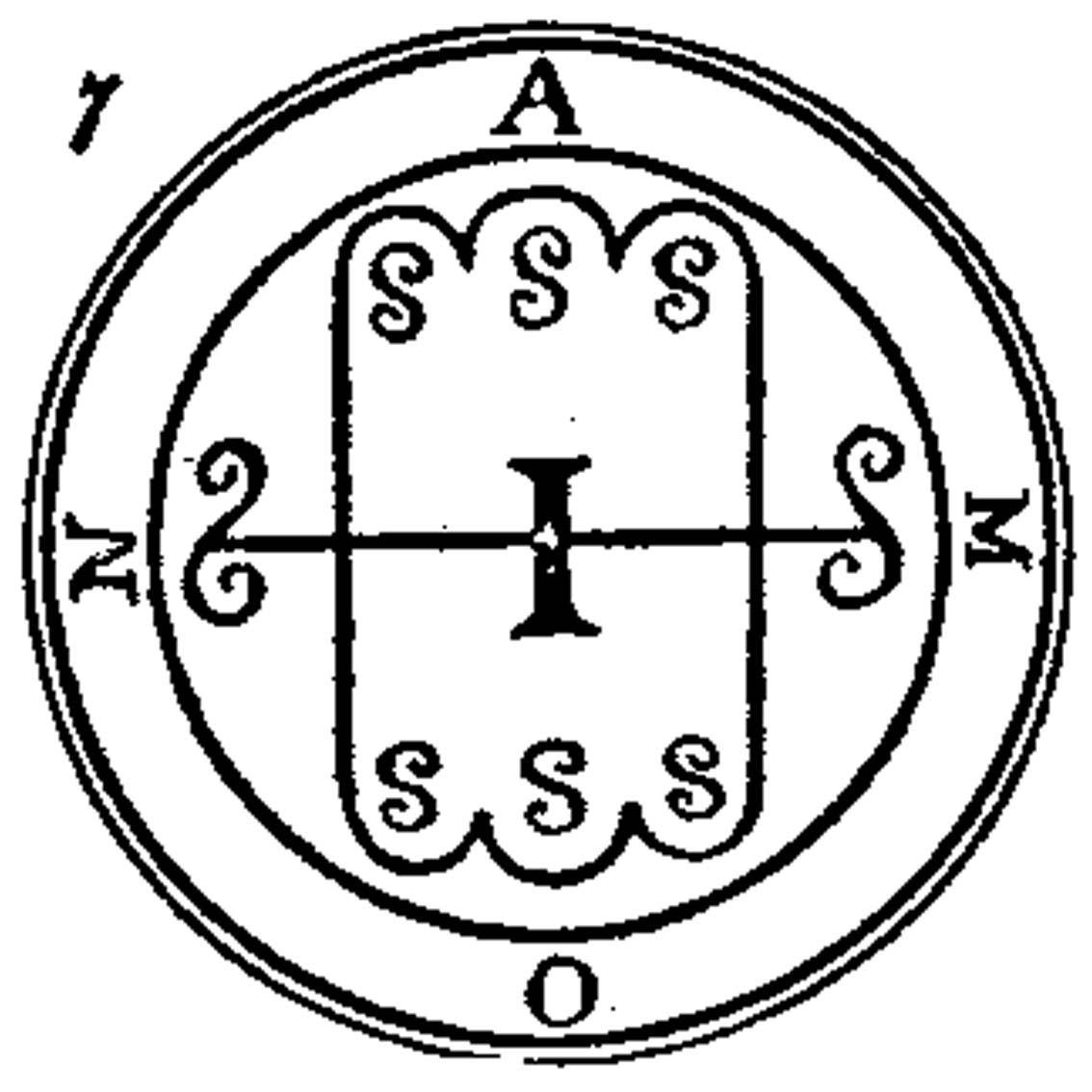
The sigil of Amon

Aamon (also known as Amon), in demonology, is a Grand Marquis of Hell who governs 40 infernal legions, and the 7th spirit of the Ars Goetia. He is the demon of life and reproduction.

== Description ==
The names Aamon and Amon come from the Libyan god Amun of Siwa Oasis or from the Punic god Baal Hammon of Carthage.

Amon, or Aamon, great and powerful marquis of the infernal empire. He has the face of a wolf, with a snake's tail; he vomits flame; when he takes human form, he has only the body of man; his head resembles that of an owl and his beak shows very reckless canine teeth. He is the most solid of the princes of demons. He knows the past and the future, and reconciles, when he wants, the friends scrambled. He commanded forty legions. The Egyptians saw Amon or Amoun, their supreme God; they represented him with blue skin, in a fairly human form. He commands 40 legions of demons and carries the title of Prince. He reconciles friends and foes and procures love for those seeking it.

— Dictionnaire Infernal, Jacques Collin de Plancy

He was written about by Johann Weyer in 1583 in the Pseudomonarchia Daemonum.

Amon, or Aamon, is a great and mighty marques, and commeth abroad in the likeness of a Wolf, having a serpents tail, [vomiting] flames of fire; when he putteth on the shape of a man, he sheweth out dogs teeth, and a great head like to a mighty [night hawk]; he is the strongest prince of all other, and understandeth of all things past and to come, he procureth favor, and reconcileth both friends and foes, and rule forthy legions of devils.

And much later by S. L. MacGregor Mathers in The Lesser Key of Solomon.

The Seventh Spirit is Amon. He is a Marquis great in power, and most stern. He appeareth like a Wolf with a Serpent's tail, vomiting out of his mouth flames of fire; but at the command of the Magician he putteth on the shape of a Man with Dog's teeth beset in a head like a Raven; or else like a Man with a Raven's head (simply). He telleth all things Past and to Come. He procureth feuds and reconcileth controversies between friends. He governeth 40 Legions of Spirits. His Seal is this which is to be worn as aforesaid, etc.

Harley MS 6483 of The Lesser Key of Solomon states that Amon can also enable the magician to summon and interrogate the spirits of those who drowned at sea.

== In popular culture ==
Aamon appears as a hero in the video game Mobile Legends: Bang Bang, but instead of a demon, he's a shard wielding assassin.

It also appears in The Rookie, season 8 episode 3, on a drawing in Ezra Kane's motel room.

Aamon appears as a demon, and the main antagonist, who possesses the fiancé of the main protagonist in the ShudderShudder (streaming service) Original film The Cleansing Hour.

Aamon appears in the manga Amon: The Dark Side of the Devilman and the OVA loosely based on it, Amon: Apocalypse of Devilman.

== Bibliography ==
- S. L. MacGregor Mathers, A. Crowley, The Goetia: The Lesser Key of Solomon the King, ISBN 0-87728-847-X.
- Collin de Plancy, Dictionnaire Infernal
- The Lesser Key of Solomon
- Pseudomonarchia Daemonum
- History of Witchcraft and Demonology by Montague Summers
- Biblical Demonology by Merrill F. Unger
- Demonology: The Hierarchies of Hell by Michael Szul
