= Hinn (mythology) =

Supernatural creatures in Arabian folklore

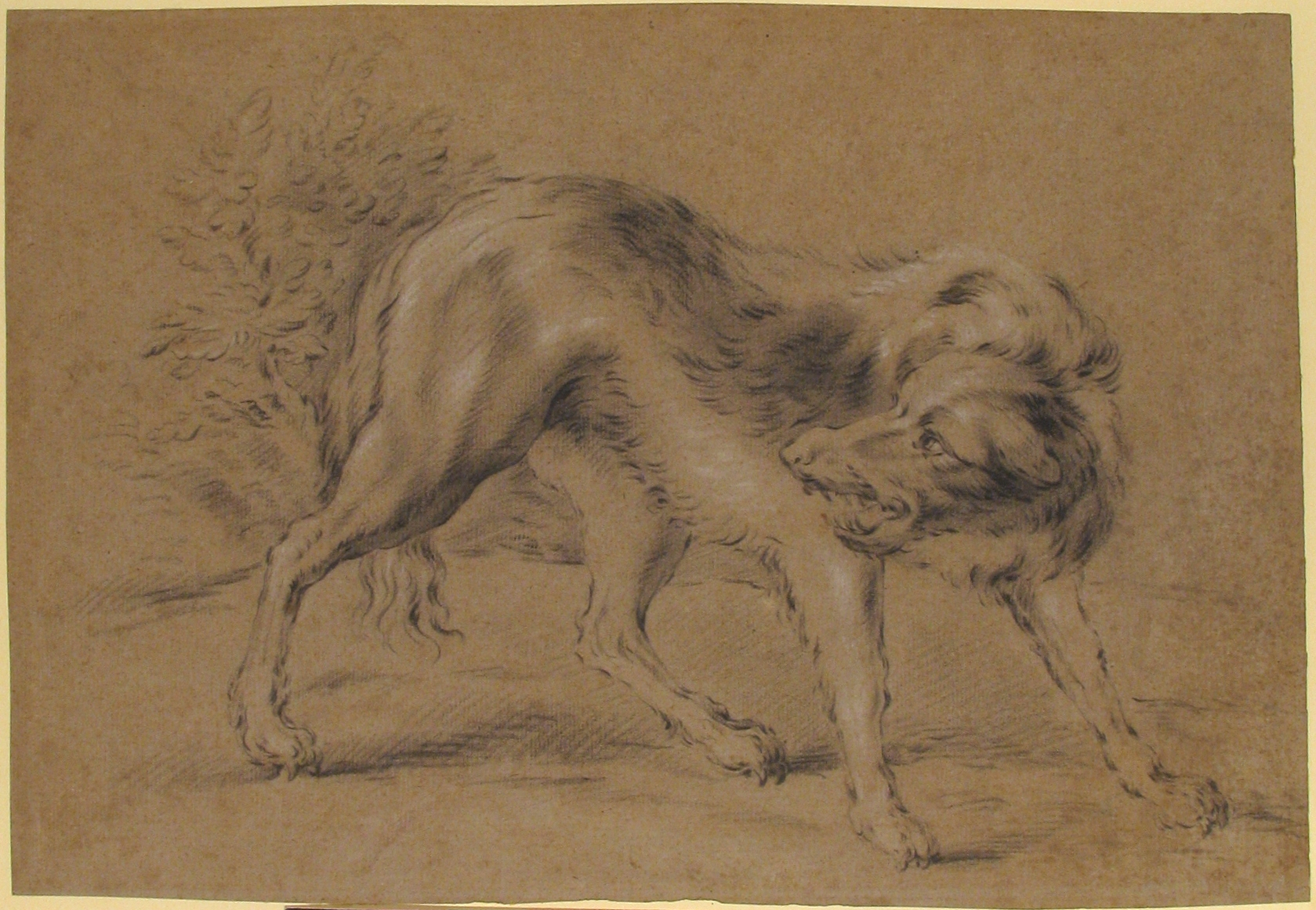
According to some folklore, hinn are believed to be still alive and take the shape of dogs.

Ḥinn (Arabic: حنّ, from the root h-n-n 'to desire' or 'to sigh for something') are a kind of supernatural creature—along with jinn— from pre-Islamic Arabian lore. Like jinn, they are sometimes considered to be a pre-Adamitic race in Islamic hagiography.

The Sufi Shibli considered them to be the dogs of the jinn.

Their existence, along with that of binn, timm, and rimm, is accepted by the Druze.

== Pre-Islamic references ==
Ḥinn, said to appear in the form of wild dogs, were referred to, along with jinn, in pre-Islamic poetry: "Jinn and Ḥinn frolic around me!" They also found their ways into hadith tradition, stating that if a wild dog approaches a Muslim, they shall throw some food to it and chase it away, because it could have an evil soul.

== Pre-Adamic Creation in Quran exegesis ==
Theories on what creation existed before the creation of Adam emerge from interpretive reflections on Qur'anic verses, particularly Surah al-Baqarah (2:30):

"And when your Lord said to the angels, 'I am placing a vicegerent on earth,' they said, 'Will You place in it someone who will spread corruption and shed blood, while we glorify You with praise and proclaim Your holiness?' He said, 'Indeed, I know that which you do not know.'" — Qur'an 2:30

This verse has historically been considered as a reference to jinn or other creatures who caused bloodshed before Adam. According to Ibn Kathir, the Ḥinn belongs together with the jinn to those creatures who shed blood on earth before humankind, causing the angels to question God's command to place Adam as a vicegerent.

Ibn Barrajan mentions pre-Adamite beings in a discussion about angels and jinn. He indicates that they are created from the elements of Jahannam and water. They can originate from minerals, plants, or animals. Some were anticipating (hanna) the creation of Adam and called Ḥinn, while the others were aversed to humans (bana), wreaking havoc and hence called Binn.

Although many sources describe the Ḥinn and Binn as powerful gigantic primordial creatures, al-Jahiz mentions them as a "weak type" of supernatural being in his Kitāb al-Ḥayawān.
