= Foras =

President of Hell in demonology

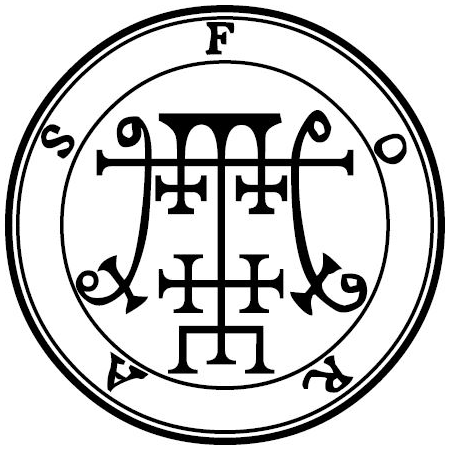

Foras or Forrasis, in demonology, is a powerful president of Hell, being obeyed by twenty-nine legions of demons. He teaches logic and ethics in all their branches, the virtues of all herbs and precious stones, can make a man witty, eloquent, invisible, and live long (invincible according to some authors), and can discover treasures and recover lost things.

He is depicted as a strong man:

The Thirty-first Spirit is Foras. He is a Mighty President, and appeareth in the Form of a Strong Man in Human Shape. He can give the understanding to Men how they may know the Virtues of all Herbs and Precious Stones. He teacheth the Arts of Logic and Ethics in all their parts. If desired he maketh men invisible, and to live long, and to be eloquent. He can discover Treasures and recover things Lost. He ruleth over 29 Legions of Spirits, and his Seal is this, which wear thou, etc.

— The Lesser Key of Solomon

The Latin Pseudomonarchia Daemonorum says of him:

Forras vel Forcas magnus Præses est: visitur forma viri fortissimi, & in humana specie vires herbarum & lapidum preciosorum [sic] intelligit. Plenè docet Logica, Ethica & eorundem partes. Reddit hominem invisibilem, ingeniosum, loquacem & vivacem: amissa recuperat, thesauros detegit. Dominium viginti novem legionum habet.

[Forras and/or Forcas is a great governor: he is visited in the form of the strongest man, and in human appearance he understands grasses' and precious stones' powers. He teaches completely logic and ethics and the parts of them. He renders people invisible, ingenious, talkative, and vigorous/long lived. He recovers things amiss and exposes hoards. His domain has twenty-nine legions.]

His name seems to derive from Latin foras, lit. 'out, outside'.

== See also ==
- The Lesser Key of Solomon

== Sources ==
- MacGregor Mathers, S. L.; Crowley, A. (1995) [1904]. The Goetia: The Lesser Key of Solomon the King. Weiser Books. ISBN 0-87728-847-X.
