= Archdemon =

Evil counterparts of the archangels

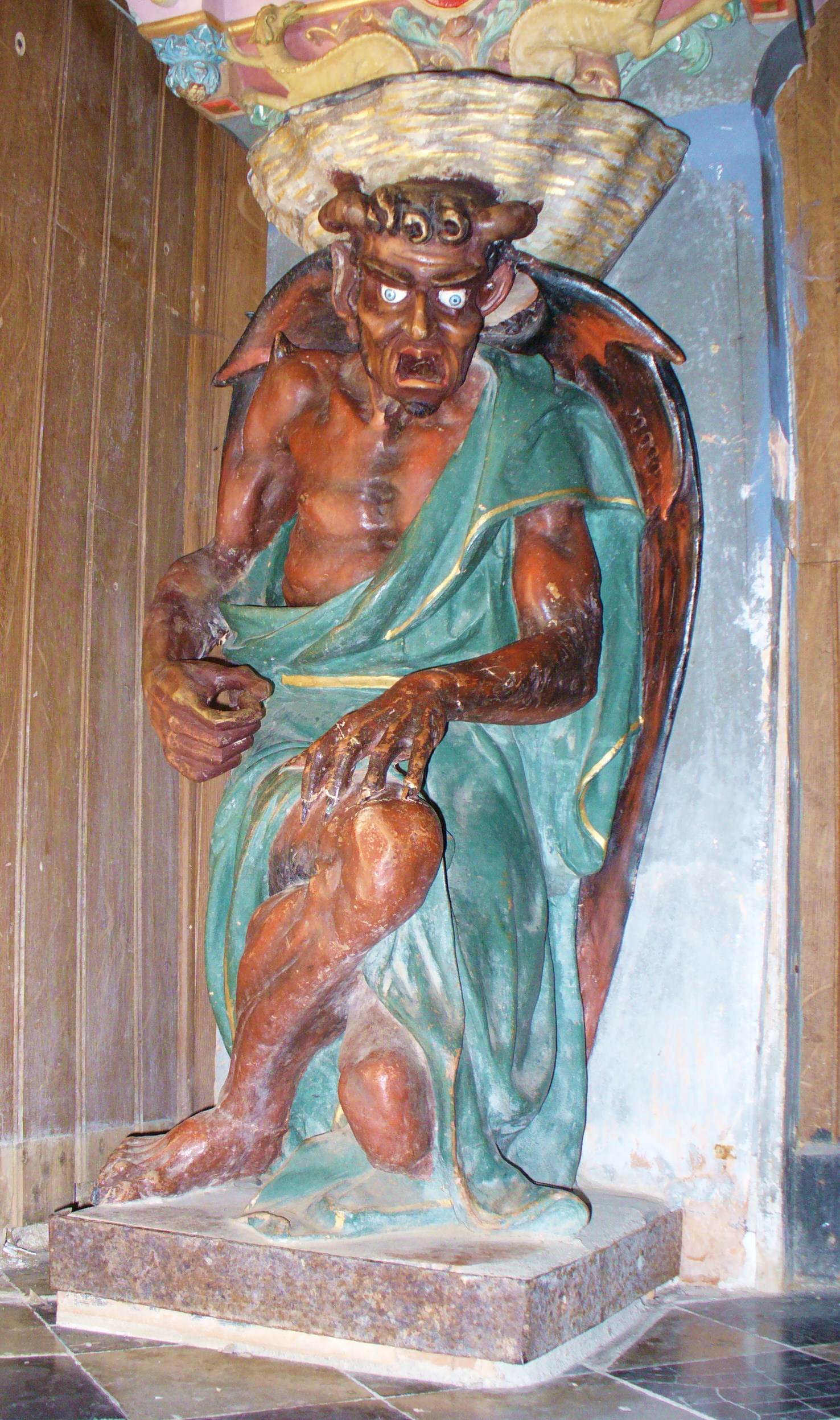
The figure of archdemon Asmodeus in Rennes-le-Château

In some occult and similar writings, an archdemon (also spelled archdaemon), archdevil, or archfiend is a spiritual entity prominent in the infernal hierarchy as a leader of demons.

In some beliefs, archdemons are the evil opponents of the archangels.

== Zoroastrianism ==
In Middle Persian Zoroastrian literature, the dēws are sometimes organized into a hierarchy headed by a small group of archdemons (Middle Persian: kamālīgān dēwān). In the Bundahishn, six principal archdemons stand in opposition to the Amahraspands, while innumerable lesser demons act as their associates. This systematic opposition is most fully developed in the Middle Persian texts; earlier Avestan sources contain lists of major demons, but not yet the same fully developed hierarchy. Andrés-Toledo describes the development of Zoroastrian demonology as a gradual elevation of a group of archdemons to the top of the demonic hierarchy, consciously set against the Beneficent Immortals.

The six archdemons of the Bundahishn are Akōman, opposed to Vohuman; Indar, opposed to Ardwahisht; Sawul (Saurva), opposed to Shahrewar; Nāhīg or Naonhaithya, also associated with Tarōmad, opposed to Spandarmad; Taurvi, opposed to Hordad; and Zairi, opposed to Amurdad. The Bundahishn explicitly calls these six the archdemons and describes other demons as their associates. Aeshma, the demon of wrath, is also a major figure and is paired against Srosh, but is distinct from the core group of six. In another cosmogonic enumeration, the Evil Spirit himself is counted as the seventh after the principal demons, which partly accounts for differing descriptions of a six- or sevenfold group.

== Christian traditions ==
Archdemons are described as the leaders of demonic hosts, just as archangels lead choirs of angels. Based upon the writings of Saint Paul (Col. 1:16; Eph. 1:21) the angelic court had been constructed by Pseudo-Dionysius the Areopagite and comprised nine orders of angels with three orders each to three hierarchies.

The first hierarchy consists of seraphim, cherubim and thrones. The second hierarchy consists of dominations, virtues and powers. The third hierarchy consists of principalities, archangels and angels. This system of classifying angels has been accepted by the majority of Christian scholars. However, no similar consensus has been reached on the classification of demons. This is largely due to the fact that, historically, the definition of what an archdemon is and the names of those demons has varied greatly over time.

One common medieval classification associate the seven deadly sins with archdemons:

- Lucifer: Pride
- Mammon: Greed
- Asmodeus: Lust
- Leviathan: Envy
- Beelzebub: Gluttony
- Satan: Wrath
- Belphegor: Sloth

In the occult tradition, there is controversy regarding which demons should be classed as archdemons. During different ages, some demons were historically "promoted" to archdemons, others were completely forgotten, and new ones were created. In ancient Jewish lore, many of the pagan gods of neighboring cultures were identified as extremely pernicious demons in order to prevent Jews from worshiping them.

Therefore, the pagan deity Ba'al was reinterpreted as the archdemon Bael or Beelzebub, and the pagan deity Astarte was reinterpreted as the archdemon Astaroth. These two in particular were seen as some of the worst enemies of God. By the Middle Ages, these pagan deities were no longer worshiped, so their characterizations as archdemons were no longer important, but they still persisted anyway. New archdemons were invented over time, most of them revolving around Satan and the Antichrist.

== Islamic tradition ==
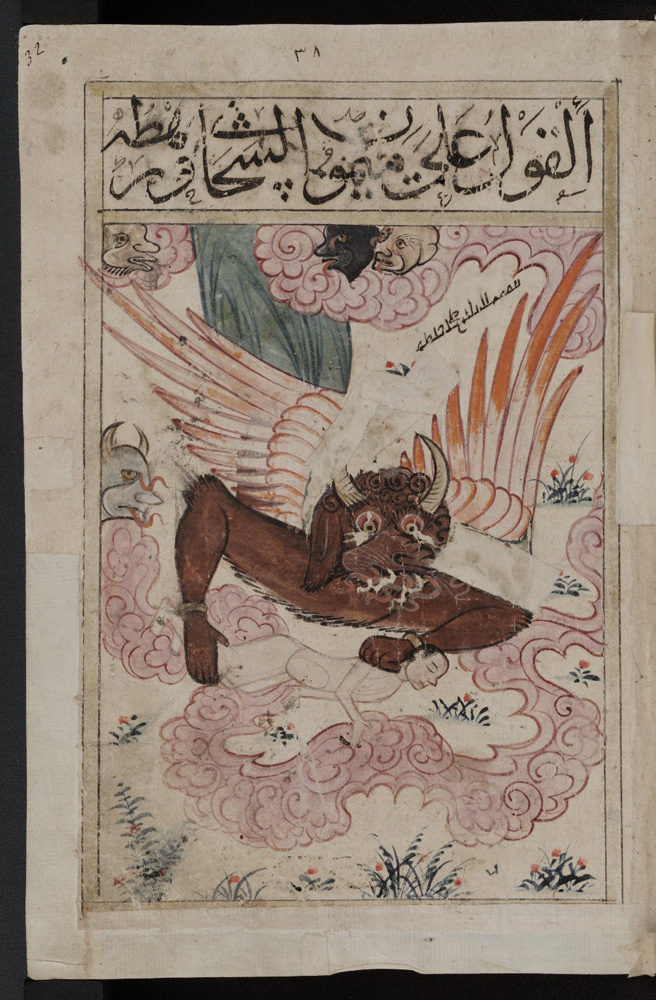
Maymūn, the demon king of Saturday

According to Middle Eastern Folkmagic, seven kings of the jinn are typically assigned to the days of the week. Although they can, unlike the spirits of heavens, perform both good and evil acts, they have a responsibility given by God regarding the affairs of the earth. In some reports, they are infernal demons (ʻIfrīt) rather than explicitly jinn. A hadith from Wahb ibn Munabbih reports that the archetypes of the jinn are like air, differing from the regular jinn, they don't need to eat, drink and they do not produce offspring. Since they do not move themselves, they send subordinate devils (shayāṭīn). They are mentioned in several Muslim treatises, such as the Book of Wonders.

The Muslim occultist Ahmad al-Buni sets four of these kings named Mudhib, Maimun, Barqan and al-Ahmar, in opposition to the four archangels of Islam. They frequently appear inscribed in talismans. According to Muslim astrology, one needs to get permission of the king of the jinn for the corresponding day to perform a spell. When the jinn-king is summoned together with the name of the angel responsible for the day, it would be impossible for the jinn-king to deny an order of the sorcerer.

According to Mas'udi's "Annals of Time", four Afarit carry the throne of Iblis, analogue to the Hamlat al Arsh carrying the throne of God.

== Middle Eastern tales ==
In some Middle Eastern legends, an order of nineteen angels of hell exists, each commanding a host of devils. Among them is the Quranic guardian of hell-fire Maalik. Another Quranic member is the fallen angel Iblis, who is also their leader. However, most individual members are not based on the Quran, but integrated to Muslim understanding of sin. One member of the infernal council is responsible for distracting during prayer, one advocates illicit innovations in religious affairs, yet another one incites lust (etc.). These devils are not thought to fulfill the requests of a sorcerer, but serve as means of punishment in the hereafter or as adversaries of the prophet Solomon. According to the corresponding legend, both Solomon and the arch-devils struggle for their reign over the jinn and div.

== Demon Kings of the Ars Goetia ==
The Lesser Key of Solomon, an anonymous 17th-century grimoire, lists 72 of the most powerful and prominent demons of Hell in its first part, the Ars Goetia. Satan himself is not mentioned among them considering his overall dominion of Hell as the Prince of Darkness. Below him, the Ars Goetia suggests, are the four kings of the cardinal directions who have power over the seventy-two, next the kings, and onward with other demons with lower monarchic titles. The four kings of the cardinal directions are the primary point of contention between different editions and translations, and occultist writers. The common composition of the kings is:

- King of the East: Amaymon
- King of the West: Corson
- King of the North: Ziminiar
- King of the South: Gaap
- King Bael
- King Paimon
- King Beleth
- King Purson
- King Asmodey
- King Viné
- King Balam
- King Zagan
- King Belial
