= Classification of demons =

Differing classification systems of demons

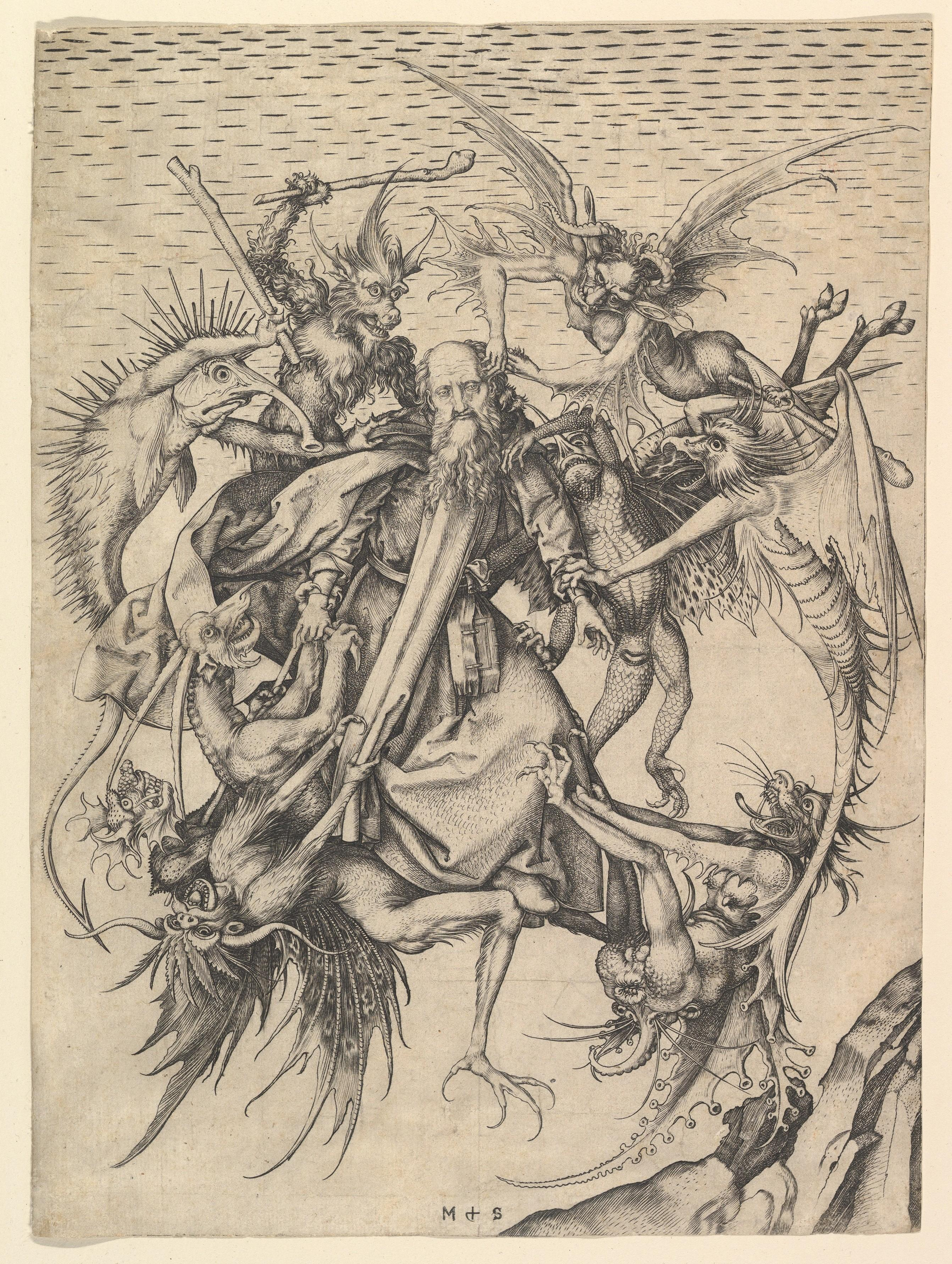
The Temptation of St. Anthony by Martin Schongauer; Anthony is depicted being attacked by demons

There have been various attempts at the classification of demons within the contexts of classical mythology, demonology, occultism, and Renaissance magic. These classifications may be for purposes of traditional medicine, exorcisms, ceremonial magic, witch-hunts, lessons in morality, folklore, religious ritual, or combinations thereof. Classifications might be according to astrological connections, elemental forms, noble titles, or parallels to the angelic hierarchy; or by association with particular sins, diseases, and other calamities; or by what angel or saint opposes them.

Many of the authors of such classifications identified as Christian, though Christian authors are not the only ones who have written on the subject.

== Classification by domain ==
=== The Testament of Solomon ===
The Testament of Solomon is a pseudepigraphical work, purportedly written by King Solomon, in which the author mostly describes particular demons whom he enslaved to help build the temple, the questions he put to them about their deeds and how they could be thwarted, and their answers, which provide a kind of self-help manual against demonic activity. The date is very dubious, though it is considered the oldest surviving work particularly concerned with individual demons.

=== Psellus' classification ===
Michael Psellus prepared the influential De operatione dæmonum (On the Operation of Demons) in the 11th century, with a taxonomy dividing demons into six types: Leliurium (Igneous), Aërial, Marine (Aqueous), Terrestrial (Earthly), Subterranean, and Lucifugous (Heliophobic).

=== Lanterne of Light ===
In 1409–1410 The Lanterne of Light (an anonymous English Lollard tract often attributed to John Wycliffe) provided a classification system based on the seven deadly sins, known as the "seven deadly devils" or "seven princes of Hell", with each demon tempting people by means of those sins, as follows:

Þe firste is Lucifer þat regneþ in his malice.̉ ouer þe children of pride
Þe secounde is clepid Belzebub.̉ þat lordiþ ouer envious
Þe þridde deuel is Sathanas.̉ & wraþþe is his lordschip
Þe fourþe is clepid Abadon.̉ þe slowȝ ben hise retenwe
Þe fifþe deuel is Mammon.̉ & haþ wiþ him þe auarouse
and also oone þat is his feere.̉ a foule synne couetise
Þe sixte is clepid Belphegor.̉ þat is þe god of glotouns
Þe seuenþ deuel is Asmodeus.̉ þat leediþ wiþ him þe leccherouse

— The Lanterne of Light in original Middle English, p. 60
Translation:

The first is Lucifer that reigns in his malice over the children of pride
The second is called Beelzebub that lords over [the] envious
The third is Satan and wrath is his lordship
The fourth is called Abaddon, the sloth[ful] be his retinue
The fifth is Mammon and has with him the avarice [avaricious]
and also fittingly, a foul sin, covetousness, is with his company of subjects
The sixth is called Belphegor, that is the god of gluttons
The seventh is Asmodeus, that leads with him the lecherous

— Translation: Collette and Garrett-Goodyear

This list was later used in the works of John Taylor, the Water Poet. Later writers, such as Peter Binsfeld, assigned different demons to the respective sins and should not be confused with this list. The two classification systems are shown side-by-side below:

The Lanterne of Light

1. Lucifer: Pride
2. Beelzebub: Envy
3. Satan: Wrath
4. Abaddon: Sloth
5. Mammon: Greed
6. Belphegor: Gluttony
7. Asmodeus: Lust

Translation:
Binsfeld's classification

1. Lucifer: Pride
2. Mammon: Greed
3. Asmodeus: Lust
4. Leviathan: Envy
5. Beelzebub: Gluttony
6. Satan: Wrath
7. Belphegor: Sloth

=== Spina's classification ===
Alphonso de Spina, in 1467, prepared a classification of demons.

- Incubi and succubi
- Wandering groups or armies of demons can include multiple regions in hell
- Familiars
- Drudes
- Cambions and other demons that are born from the union of a demon with a human being.
- Liar and mischievous demons
- Demons that attack the saints are rogue demons
- Demons that try to induce old women to attend Witches' Sabbaths

This classification is somewhat capricious and it is difficult to find a criterion for it. It seems that Spina was inspired by several legends and stories. The drudes belong to German folklore. Familiars, goblins, and other mischievous demons belong to the folklore of most European countries.

The belief in incubi and succubi (and their ability to procreate) seem to have inspired the fifth category, but it could also have been inspired in the Talmudic legend of demons having sexual intercourse with mortal women and men (see also Mastema).

The visions of tempting demons that some early (and not so early) saints had, perhaps inspired the eighth category (e.g. the visions of Anthony the Great).

The idea of old women attending Sabbaths was common during the European Middle Ages and Renaissance, and Spina mentioned it before the Malleus Maleficarum.

=== Agrippa's classification ===
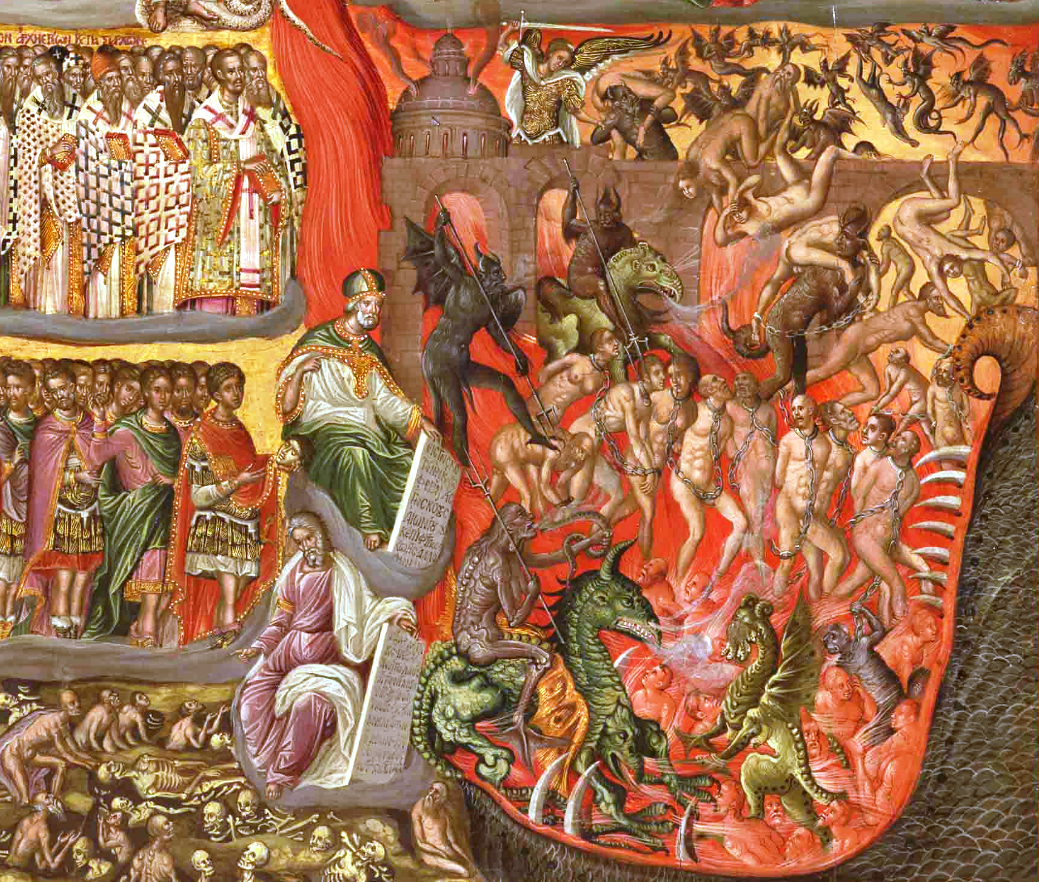
16th Century Soldier Demons by Georgios Klontzas

In De occulta philosophia (1509-1510), Heinrich Cornelius Agrippa proposed several classifications for demons, based on numeric scales, like his whole Cosmology. Francis Barrett, in his book The Magus (1801), adopted this classification of demons.

==== Scale of unity ====
- One prince of rebellion, of angels, and darkness:
  - Lucifer

==== Scale of binary ====
- Two chiefs of the devils:
  - Behemoth
  - Leviathan

==== Scale of ternary ====
- Three furies:
  - Alecto
  - Megera
  - Ctesiphon
- Three infernal judges:
  - Minos
  - Aeacus
  - Rhadamanthus

==== Scale of quaternary ====
- Four Princes of devils in the elements:
  - Samael: Fire
  - Azrael: Water
  - Azazel: Air
  - Mahazael: Earth
- Four Princes of spirits, upon the four angles of the world
  - Oriens: East
  - Paimon: West
  - Egyn: North
  - Amaymon: South

Despite listing these separately, Agrippa mentions that these groups are identical, making the first as the Hebrew equivalent of the names of the latter. The same four demons appear in the Semiphoras and Schemhamforas.

==== Scale of six ====
- Six authors of all calamities:
  - Acteus
  - Megalesius
  - Ormenus
  - Lycus
  - Nicon
  - Mimon

==== Scale of novenary ====
- Nine princes ruling over nine orders of devils (with biblical references):
  - Beelzebub: False Gods (Matthew 4:1–11)
  - Python: Spirits of Lying (1 Kings 22:21–22)
  - Belial: Instruments of iniquity and wrath (Genesis 49:5, Psalms 7:13, Isaiah 13:5, Jeremiah 50:25, Ezekiel 9:2)
  - Asmodeus: Revengers of Wickedness
  - Satan: Deluders or Imitators of miracles (Genesis 3:1–5)
  - Merihem: Aerial Powers (Revelation 7:1–2)
  - Abaddon: Furies – sowing mischief
  - Astaroth: Calumniators – inquisitors and accusers
  - Mammon: evil genies – tempters and ensnarers

=== Binsfeld's classification ===
As part of his 1589 Treatise on Confessions by Evildoers and Witches, German theologian Peter Binsfeld prepared a classification of demons known as the Princes of Hell. Like the Lanterne of Light, Binsfeld used the seven deadly sins as a basis, though the two schemes differ in various ways and methodic construction.

1. Lucifer: pride
2. Mammon: greed
3. Asmodeus: lust
4. Leviathan: envy
5. Beelzebub: gluttony
6. Satan: wrath
7. Belphegor: sloth

=== King James classification ===
King James' dissertation titled Daemonologie was first published in 1597, several years before the first publication of the King James Authorized Version of the Bible. Its three short books which are in the form of a philosophical dialogue, making arguments and comparisons between magic, sorcery, and witchcraft. Within them, James classified demons into four sections:

- Lemures or Spectra: Spirits that trouble houses or solitary places
- Obsession: Spirits that follow upon certain people to outwardly trouble them at various times of the day
- Possession: Spirits that enter inwardly into a person to trouble them
- Fairies: Spirits that prophesy, consort, and transport

His classification was not based on separate demonic entities with their names, ranks, or titles, but rather categorized them based on four methods used by any given devil to cause mischief or torment on a living individual or a corpse. The purpose was to relay the belief that spirits caused maladies and that magic was possible only through demonic influence. He further quotes previous authors who state that each devil has the ability to appear in diverse shapes or forms for varying arrays of purposes as well. In his description of them, he relates that demons are under the direct supervision of God and are unable to act without permission, further illustrating how demonic forces are used as a "Rod of Correction" when men stray from the will of God and may be commissioned by witches, or magicians to conduct acts of ill will against others but will ultimately only conduct works that will end in the further glorification of God despite their attempts to do otherwise.

=== Michaëlis's classification ===
In 1613 the Dominican prior and French inquisitor, Sébastien Michaëlis wrote a book, Admirable History, which included a classification of demons as it was told to him by the demon Berith when he was exorcising a nun, according to the author. (Note: In Michaëlis's classification, many demons' names are exclusively French or unknown in other catalogs. Michaëlis, in referring to the saints who are adversaries of each demon, names unambiguously only St. John the Baptist, St. John the Evangelist, St. Vincent Ferrer, and St. Francis de Paul with their full appellations. The other saints are cited only by their name, without distinguishing one from the other, when of the same name; so, for example, St Francis is not specifically designated as St Francis of Assisi.) This classification is based on the Pseudo-Dionysian hierarchies, according to the sins the devil tempts one to commit, and includes the demons' adversaries (who suffered that temptation without falling).

==== First hierarchy ====
The first hierarchy includes angels that were Seraphim, Cherubim, and Ophanim/Thrones:

- Beelzebub was a prince of the Seraphim, second to Lucifer, founder of Hell’s Order of the Fly. He tempts men with envy and is opposed by St. Francis.
- Leviathan was also a prince of the Seraphim who tempts people to give into heresy, and is opposed by St. Peter.
- Asmodeus was a prince of the Ophanim/Thrones, burning with desire to tempt men into wantonness. He is opposed by St. John the Baptist.
- Berith was a prince of the Cherubim. He tempts men to commit homicide, and to be quarrelsome, contentious, and blasphemous. He is opposed by St. Barnabas.
- Astaroth was a prince of Thrones, who tempts men to be lazy and is opposed by St. Bartholomew.
- Verrine was also a prince of Thrones, just below Astaroth. He tempts men with impatience and is opposed by St. Dominic.
- Gressil was the third prince of Thrones, who tempts men with impurity and is opposed by St. Bernard.
- Soneillon was the fourth prince of Thrones, who tempts men to hate and is opposed by St. Stephen.

==== Second hierarchy ====
The second hierarchy includes Powers, Dominions, and Virtues:

- Carreau was a prince of Powers. He tempts men with hardness of heart and is opposed by St. Vincent.
- Carnivale was also a prince of Powers. He tempts men to obscenity and shamelessness, and is opposed by John the Evangelist.
- Oeillet was a prince of Dominions. He tempts men to break the vow of poverty and is opposed by St. Martin.
- Rosier was the second in the order of Dominions. He tempts men against sexual purity and is opposed by St. Basil.
- Belias was the prince of Virtues. He tempts men with arrogance and women to be vain, raise wanton children, and gossip during mass. He is opposed by St. Francis de Paul.

==== Third hierarchy ====
The third hierarchy Principalities, Archangels, and Angels:

- Verrier was the prince of Principalities. He tempts men against the vow of obedience and is opposed by St. Bernard.
- Olivier was the prince of the Archangels. He tempts men with cruelty and mercilessness toward the poor and is opposed by St. Lawrence, patron saint of the poor.
- Iuvart was the prince of Angels. At the time of Michaelis's writing, Iuvart was believed to have possessed a young novice nun of the Ursulines, Madeleine Demandols de La Palud, from whom it was exorcised.

Many of the names and ranks of these demons appear in the Sabbath litanies of witches, according to Jules Garinet's Histoire de la magie en France, and Collin de Plancy's Dictionnaire Infernal.

== Classification by office ==
In the study of demonology, many spirits are classified by office, rank, or titles which theologians believe were once held in heaven before the fall, or which they currently hold in their infernal dwelling. These offices are usually elaborated in several grimoires which determines their authority in hell or abilities. Demons categorized by office are often depicted in a militant hierarchy, in which a general may hold command over some designated legion for a specialized function which they may trouble men. Other theologians have determined the classification of a spirit's office depending on the times or locations which they roam the Earth.

=== The Book of Abramelin ===
The Book of Abramelin, possibly written in the 14th or 15th century, lists four princes of the demons: Lucifer, Leviathan, Satan and Belial. There are also eight sub-princes: Astaroth, Magoth, Asmodee, Beelzebub, Oriens, Paimon, Ariton (Egin) and Amaymon. Under the rule of these there are many lesser demons.

=== Le Livre des Esperitz ===
Written in the 15th or 16th century, this grimoire was a likely source for Wierus hierarchy of demons, but while Wierus mentions 69 demons, Le Livre des Esperitz has only 46. Wierus omitted, however, the four demons of the cardinal points: Oriens, Poymon/Paimon, Amaymon and Equi (see Agrippa's classification) and the three great governors of all the other demons: Lucifer, Beelzebub and Satan.

=== The Munich Manual of Demonic Magic ===
Written in the 15th century, this manual includes a list of eleven demons.

=== Fasciculus Rerum Geomanticarum ===
Written in 1494, this grimoire contains a list of 37 demons.

=== Le Dragon Rouge (or Grand Grimoire) ===
Like many works of mystical nature, Le Dragon Rouge (or the Red Dragon) claims to come from Solomon and his priests and is said to be published in 1517 by Alibeck the Egyptian. However, it was most likely written in France in the 18th century.

The grimoire details the different hosts of hell and their powers, describing how to enter a pact with them to attain the magicians' goals. The demons of hell are classified by three different tiers from Generals to Officers.

=== Pseudomonarchia Daemonum ===
Pseudomonarchia Daemonum, by Johann Weyer, is a grimoire that contains a list of demons and the appropriate hours and rituals to conjure them in the name of God, Jesus and the Holy Ghost (simpler than those cited by The Lesser Key of Solomon below).

This book was written around 1583, and lists sixty-nine demons. The demons Vassago, Seir, Dantalion and Andromalius are not listed in this book. Pseudomonarchia Daemonum does not attribute seals to the demons.

=== The Lesser Key of Solomon ===
The Lesser Key of Solomon or Lemegeton Clavicula Salomonis is an anonymous 17th century grimoire, and one of the most popular books of demonology. The Lesser Key of Solomon contains detailed descriptions of spirits and the conjurations needed to invoke and oblige them to do the will of the conjurer (referred to as the "exorcist"). It details the protective signs and rituals to be performed, the actions necessary to prevent the spirits from gaining control, the preparations prior to the invocations, and instructions on how to make the necessary instruments for the execution of these rituals.

The author of The Lesser Key of Solomon copied Pseudomonarchia Daemonum almost completely, but added demons' descriptions, their seals and details.

==== The Ars Goetia ====
Ars Goetia is the first section of The Lesser Key of Solomon, containing descriptions of the seventy-two demons that King Solomon is said to have evoked and confined in a bronze vessel sealed by magic symbols, and that he obliged to work for him.

The Ars Goetia assigns a rank and a title of nobility to each member of the infernal hierarchy, and gives the demons "signs they have to pay allegiance to", or seals.

List of Demons
Kings	Baal, Paimon, Beleth, Purson, Asmodeus, Vine, Balam, Zagan, Belial
Dukes	Amdusias, Agares, Valefar, Barbatos, Augusyon, Eligos, Zepar, Bathin, Saleos, Aim, Buné, Berith, Astaroth, Focalor, Vepar, Vual, Crocell, Allocer, Murmur, Gemory, Vapula, Flauros, Dantalion
Princes	Vassago, Sitri, Ipos, Gaap, Stolas, Orobas, Seir
Marquis	Gamigin, Aamon, Leraje, Naberius, Ronové, Forneus, Marchosias, Phenex, Sabnock, Shax, Orias, Andras, Andrealphus, Kimaris, Decarabia
Earls	Furfur, Malthus, Raum, Bifrons, Andromalius
Knights	Furcas
Presidents	Marbas, Buer, Botis, Morax, Glasya-Labolas, Foras, Malphas, Haagenti, Camio, Ose, Amy, Valac

=== Dictionnaire Infernal ===
The Dictionnaire Infernal (English: Infernal Dictionary) is a book on demonology, organised in hellish hierarchies. It was written by Jacques Collin de Plancy and first published in 1818. There were several editions of the book, but perhaps the most famous is the edition of 1863, in which sixty-nine illustrations were added to the book. These illustrations are drawings that depict the descriptions of the appearance of a number of demons. Many of these images were later used in S. L. MacGregor Mathers's edition of The Lesser Key of Solomon though some of the images were removed.

The book was first published in 1818 and then divided into two volumes, with six reprints and many changes between 1818 and 1863. This book attempts to provide an account of all the knowledge concerning superstitions and demonology.

Collin de Plancy presented a hierarchy of demons based in modern European courts:

- Princes and dignitaries:
  - Beelzebub, supreme chief of the empire of hell, founder of the order of the Fly.
  - Satan, prince dethroned and chief of the opposition party.
  - Eurynome, prince of death, Grand Cross of the order of the Fly.
  - Moloch, prince of the country of tears, Grand Cross of the order.
  - Pluton, Prince of Fire, also Grand Cross of the order and governor of the regions in flames.
  - Pan, prince of incubi.
  - Lilith, princess of succubi.
  - Leonard, the great lord of the Sabbath, Knight of the Fly.
  - Balberith, great pontiff, lord of alliances.
  - Proserpina, archdiablesse, princess of evil spirits.
- Ministers of the Office:
  - Adrammelech, Grand Chancellor and Grand Cross of the Order of the Fly.
  - Ashtaroth, general treasurer, Knight of the Fly.
  - Nergal, chief of the secret police.
  - Baal, commander in chief of the armies of Hell, Grand Cross of the Order of the Fly.
  - Leviathan, Grand Admiral, Knight of the Fly.
- Ambassadors:
  - Belfegor, Ambassador of France.
  - Mammon, of England.
  - Belial, of Italy.
  - Rimmon, of Russia.
  - Tammuz, of Spain.
  - Hutgin, of Turkey.
  - Martinet, of Switzerland.
- Justice:
  - Lucifer, chief of (in)justice, Knight of the Fly.
  - Alastor, executor of his sentences.
- House of the princes:
  - Verdelet, master of ceremonies.
  - Succorbenoth, chief of the eunuchs of the seraglio.
  - Chamos, Grand Chambelain, Knight of the Fly.
  - Melchom, payer treasurer.
  - Nisroch, chief of the kitchen.
  - Behemoth, chief cupbearer.
  - Dagon, grand pantler.
  - Mullin, first valet.
- Secret expenses:
  - Kobal, director of theaters.
  - Asmodeus, superintendent of the gambling houses.
  - Nybbas, grand buffoon.
  - Antichrist, charlatan and necromancer.

Alexis-Vincent-Charles Berbiguier used some of these names and ranks for the demons who tormented him, in his autobiographical work Les farfadets ou Tous les démons ne sont pas de l'autre monde (1821).

=== The Satanic Bible ===
LaVey utilized the symbolism of the Four Crown Princes of Hell in The Satanic Bible, with each chapter of the book being named after each Prince. The Book of Satan: The Infernal Diatribe, The Book of Lucifer: The Enlightenment, The Book of Belial: Mastery of the Earth, and The Book of Leviathan: The Raging Sea. This association was inspired by the demonic hierarchy from The Book of the Sacred Magic of Abra-Melin the Mage.

- Satan (Hebrew) "Lord of the Inferno":

The adversary, representing opposition, the element of fire, the direction of the south, and the pentacle (which takes the form of the Sigil of Baphomet) during ritual.

- Lucifer (Latin) "The Morning Star":

The bringer of light, representing pride and enlightenment, the element of air, the direction of the east, and the stick (which takes the form of candles) during ritual.

- Belial (Hebrew) "Without a Master":

The baseness of the earth, independence and self-sufficiency, the element of earth, the direction of the north, and the sword during ritual.

- Leviathan (Hebrew) "Serpent of the Abyss":

The great dragon, representing primal secrecy, the element of water, the direction of the west, and the chalice during ritual.

== See also ==
- Archdemon
- Archangel
- Christian demonology
- Exorcism
- Hierarchy of angels
- List of theological demons
- Spiritual mapping
- Territorial spirit
- True name
- Watcher (angel)
