= Great Duke =

In traditional demonological discourse, Great Duke (also Grand Duke or simply Duke) is a rank, denoting a position of prominence amongst the hierarchy of demons. The title of Great Duke reflects the inclination of Christian demonologists to categorize the denizens of Hell into hierarchical systems akin to those of the Monarchies of Europe, and mirroring the angelic hierarchy.

== See also ==
- Classification of demons
- Nature of Hell
- Ars Goetia
