= Corson (demon) =

Goetic demon

In demonology, Corson is one of the four principal kings that have power over the seventy-two demons that are supposedly constrained by King Solomon, according to the Lesser Key of Solomon. Corson is not to be conjured except on great occasions.

He is the king of the west according to some translations of The Lesser Key of Solomon, and king of the south according to Pseudomonarchia Daemonum. The other three demon-kings of the cardinal directions are Amaymon, Ziminiar, and Gaap (although some translations of The Lesser Key of Solomon consider Belial, Beleth, Asmodai, and Gaap to be the kings of different cardinal directions, not specifying the cardinal direction that they rule over).

== Other spelling ==
- Gorson

== See also ==
- Amaymon – the cardinal spirit of the east in The Lesser Key of Solomon
- Gaap – the cardinal spirit of the south in The Lesser Key of Solomon
- Ziminiar – the cardinal spirit of the north in The Lesser Key of Solomon

== Sources ==
- S. L. MacGregor Mathers, A. Crowley, The Goetia: The Lesser Key of Solomon the King (1904). 1995 reprint: ISBN 0-87728-847-X.
