= Belphegor's prime =

Palindromic prime number

Symbol of Belphegor's prime, represented by the Greek letter π upside down

Belphegor's prime is the palindromic prime number 1000000000000066600000000000001 (10^{30} + 666 × 10^{14} + 1), a number which reads the same both backwards and forwards and is only divisible by itself and one.

In the short scale, this number would be named one nonillion, sixty-six quadrillion, six hundred trillion one. In the long scale, this number's name would be one quintillion, sixty-six billiard, six hundred billion one.

== History ==
Belphegor's prime was first discovered by Harvey Dubner, a mathematician known for his discoveries of many large prime numbers and prime number forms. For Belphegor's prime in particular, he discovered the prime while determining a sequence of primes it belongs to.

The name "Belphegor's prime" was coined by author Clifford A. Pickover in 2012. Belphegor is one of the Seven Princes of Hell; specifically, "the demon of inventiveness". The number itself contains superstitious elements that have given it its name: the number 666 at the heart of Belphegor's prime is widely associated as being the number of the beast, used in symbolism to represent one of the creatures in the apocalypse or, more commonly, the devil. This number is surrounded on either side by thirteen zeroes and is 31 digits in length (thirteen reversed), with thirteen itself long regarded superstitiously as an unlucky number in Western culture.

== Mathematics ==
A Belphegor number is a palindromic number in the form of $1(0...)666(0...)1$. The sequence of the first four Belphegor numbers is:

$$16661, 1066601, 100666001, 10006660001, \ldots$$

Dubner noticed that 16661 is a prime number. By adding zeroes directly on both sides of the 666, while making it always start and end with a 1, Dubner found more palindromic prime numbers, including the Belphegor prime, which is second in the sequence. This sequence eventually became the Belphegor primes, named after the number. The equal number of zeroes on each side of 666 in the first few Belphegor primes is:

$$0, 13, 42, 506, 608, 2472, 2623, 28291, 181298, \ldots$$

Belphegor's prime contains 13 zeroes on either side of the central 666, and thus corresponds to the second number in this sequence.
