= Ziminiar =

One of four principal kings in demonology

In demonology, Ziminiar or Zymymar is one of the four principal kings that have power over the seventy-two demons that are supposedly constrained by King Solomon, according to the Lesser Key of Solomon. Ziminiar is not to be conjured except on great occasions. The other three demon-kings are Amaymon, Corson, and Gaap (although some translations of The Lesser Key of Solomon consider the four kings to be Belial, Beleth, Asmodai, and Gaap, not specifying the cardinal direction that they rule over).

He is the king of the north according to both The Lesser Key of Solomon and Pseudomonarchia Daemonum.

== See also ==
- Amaymon – the cardinal spirit of the east in The Lesser Key of Solomon
- Corson – the cardinal spirit of the west in The Lesser Key of Solomon
- Gaap – the cardinal spirit of the south in The Lesser Key of Solomon
