= Harvey Dubner =

American mathematician (1928–2019)

Harvey Dubner (1928–2019) was an electrical engineer and mathematician who lived in New Jersey, noted for his contributions to finding large prime numbers. In 1984, he and his son Robert collaborated in developing the 'Dubner cruncher', a board which used a commercial finite impulse response filter chip to speed up dramatically the multiplication of medium-sized multi-precision numbers, to levels competitive with supercomputers of the time, though his focus later changed to efficient implementation of FFT-based algorithms on personal computers.

He found many large prime numbers of special forms: repunits, Fibonacci primes, prime Lucas numbers, twin primes, Sophie Germain primes, Belphegor's prime, and primes in arithmetic progression. In 1993 he was responsible for more than half the known primes of more than two thousand digits.

He originated Dubner's conjecture, which proposes that all even numbers greater than 4208 are the sum of two prime numbers that have a twin.

Dubner died on October 23, 2019.
