= Ifrit =

Supernatural creatures in Arab culture and Islam

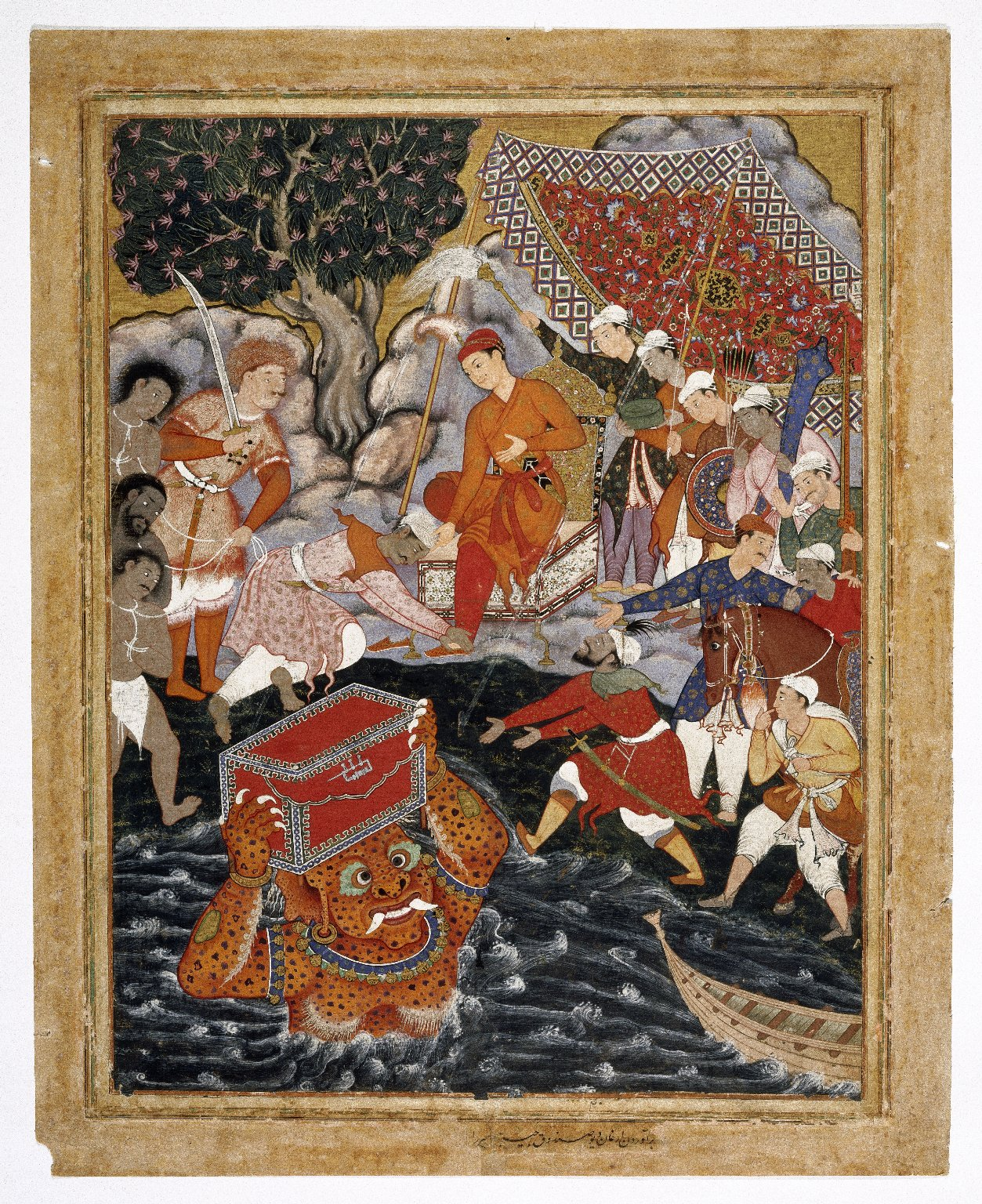
The ifrit Arghan's eyes are slightly crossed and his orange skin spotted all over; he carries a chest over the waters on behalf of Hamza, from an illustration in the Hamzanama

Ifrit, also spelled as efreet, afrit, and afreet (Arabic: عفريت, romanized: ʿifrīt [ʕifriːt], plural عفاريت ʿafārīt), is a powerful demon in Islamic culture. The ʿafārīt are often associated with the underworld and identified with the spirits of the dead, and have been compared to evil genii locorum in European culture. In Quran, hadith, and Mi'raj narrations the term functions as an epithet, always followed by the phrase "among the jinn". Due to the ambiguous meaning of the term jinn, their relation to other spirits is often unclear.

== Etymology ==
The word ifrit appears in Surah an-Naml: 39 of the Quran, but only as an epithet and not to designate a specific type of demon. The term itself is not found in pre-Islamic Arabic poetry, although variants such as ifriya and ifr are recorded prior to the Quran. Traditionally, Arab philologists trace the derivation of the word to Arabic: عفر, romanized: ʻafara, lit. 'to rub with dust, to roll into dust'. It is further used to describe sly, malicious, wicked and cunning characteristics.

Some Western philologists suggest a foreign origin of the word and attribute it to Middle Persian āfrītan, which corresponds to New Persian آفریدن "to create", but this is regarded as unlikely by others. Johnny Cheung argued that there is a Zoroastrian spirit called an āfriti- in Avestan. He suggests that this Avestan term might be the ultimate source of Arabic ‘ifrīt."

In folklore, the term is used as a substantive, referring to a specific class of demon, though most Islamic scholarly traditions regard the term as an adjective. Popular beliefs were elaborated in works such as in al-Ibshīhī's Mustatraf. They became identified either as a dangerous kind of devil (shayṭān) preying on women, or as spirits of the dead. In Turkish, the term is generally used for demons of the underworld in contrast to demons on the surface such as jinn.

== Islamic scriptures ==
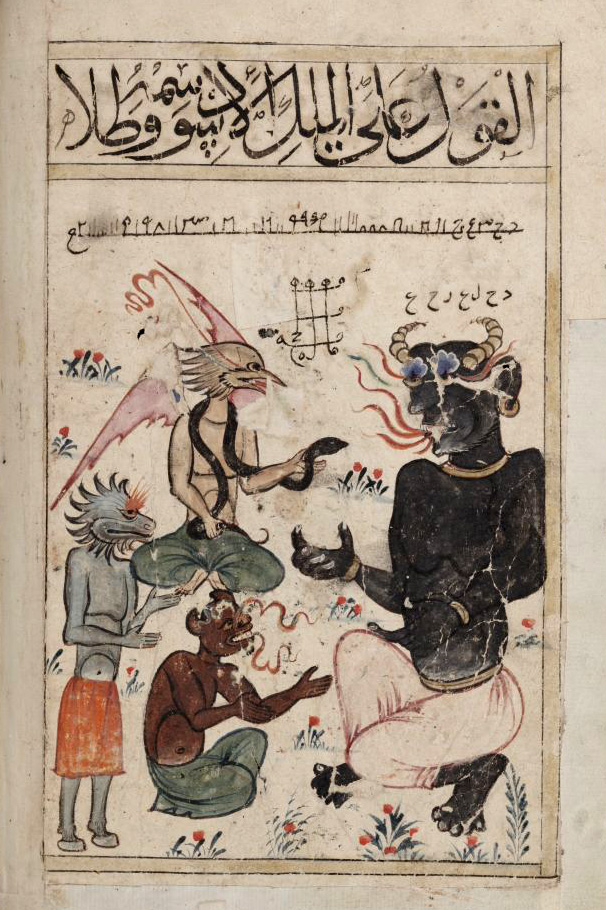
The ifrit Al-Malik al-Aswad (The Black King) sitting on the right listening to the complaints of jinn; from an Arabic manuscript in the late 14th century Book of Wonders

In Islamic scriptures the term ifrit is always followed by the expression of the jinn. Due to the ambiguous meaning of the term jinn, which is applied to a wide range of different spirits, their relation towards the genus of jinn remains vague. However, within the Islamic scriptures, the term is used as an epithet to describe a powerful or malicious spirit of an undefined nature.

In the Quran, such an ifrit is mentioned in surah al-Naml 27:38-40. The ifrit offers to carry the throne of Bilqis, queen of Sheba to King Solomon: "An ifrit from the jinn said: 'I will bring it to you before you rise from your place. And verily, I am indeed strong and trustworthy for such work." However, the duty is not given to him, but to somebody endowed with knowledge of the scripture. An "ifrit among the jinn" is mentioned in a hadith of Muhammad al-Bukhari, attempting to interrupt the prayers of Muhammad (Note: In Shibli's (d. 1367) retelling, he calls the ifrit a shayṭān, underlining the ambiguous nature of the afarit.) and in a narrative of Muhammad's night journey recorded in the eighth century by Malik ibn Anas. In the latter account, the "ifrit among the jinn" threatens Muhammad with a fiery presence, after which the Archangel Gabriel taught Muhammad a prayer to defeat it. Muslim texts explain, God sent the ifrit on purpose so that Gabriel might teach Muhammad and his ummah (Muslim community) to overcome their fear of demons at night.

Tafsīr of Surah al-Anbiya, on the story of the prophet Job, mentions Job being tested by the torment of three ifrits. After Iblis gains permission to test Job, he descends to earth and summons his most powerful devils (shaytan) and ifrits. In order to torment the prophet, they turn into storms and whirlwinds of fire to destroy Job's properties.

== Islamic folklore ==
In Islamic folklore, the afarit became a class of chthonic spirits, inhabiting the layers of the seven earths, generally ruthless and wicked, formed out of smoke and fire. (Note: The description "smoke and fire" is contrary to the jinn in Quranic traditions, who are created out of smokeless (clear) fire, but is in accord with a common tradition depicting the devils (shayāṭīn), as created out of smoke.) Despite their negative depictions and affiliation to the nether regions, afarit are not fundamentally evil on a moral plane; they might even carry out God's purpose. Such obligations can nevertheless be ruthless, such as obligation to blood vengeance and avenging murder. Nizami Ganjavi describes an ifrit tormenting Mahan, as created from "God's wrath", thus underpinning the ifrit's role secondary to God's will. Further, an ifrit can be compelled by a sorcerer, if summoned.

=== Egypt ===
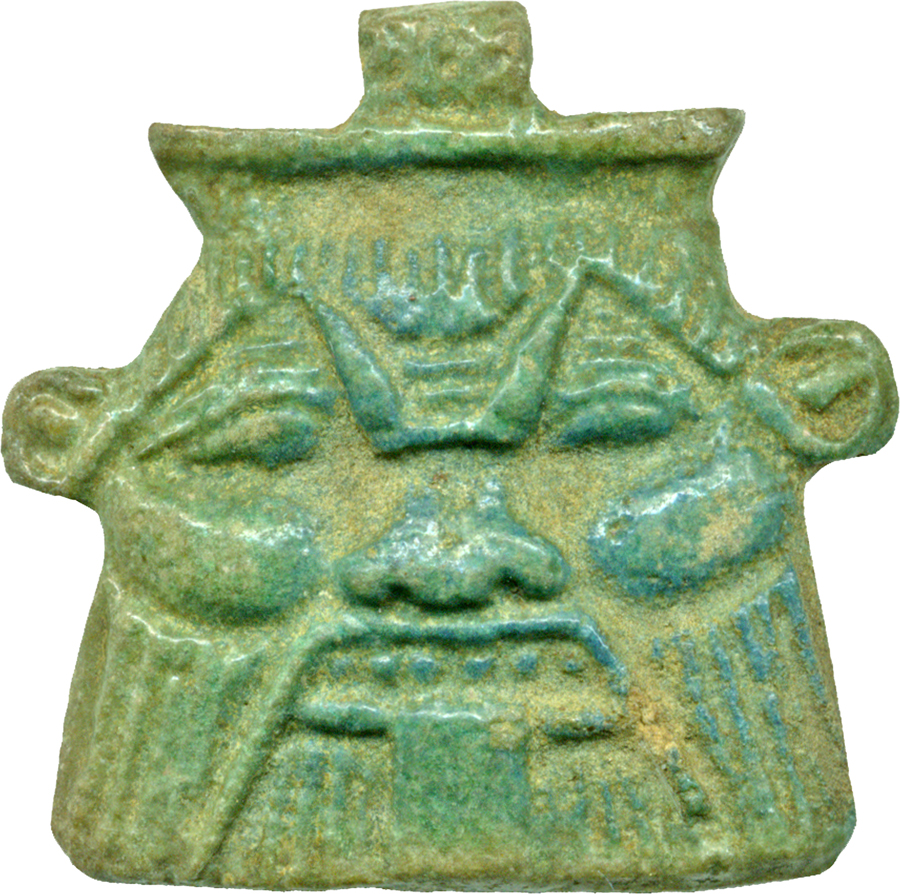
Mask depicting Bes, ancient Egyptian deity, sometimes identified with afarit by Muslim Egyptians, early 4th–1st century BC (Walters Art Museum, Baltimore)

Although afarit are not necessarily components of a person, but independent entities, a common belief in Islamic Egypt (Note: Although the identification of afarit with ghosts is usually associated with Muslims in Egypt, it is also attested among Muslims in India, Syria, and Javan Muslims in Cirebon.) associates afarit with part of a human's soul.

Probably influenced by the Ancient Egypt idea of Ka, the afarit are often identified with the spirits of the dead, departing from the body at the moment of death. They live in cemeteries, wander around places the dead person frequently visited, or roam the earth close to the place of death, until the Day of Judgment. A person who died a natural death does not have a malevolent ifrit. Only people who are killed give rise to a dangerous and active ifrit, drawn to the blood of the victim. Driving an unused nail into the blood is supposed to stop their formation. Such afarit might scare and even kill the living or take revenge on the murderer. Martyrs, saints and prophets do not have a ghost, and therefore no ifrit.

=== Morocco ===
In Moroccan belief, the afarit form a more powerful type of demon, comparable to jinn and other supernatural creatures. They have more substantial existence, and are greater in scale and capacity than other demons. However, their shapeshifting abilities are inferior compared to jinn. Their physical appearance is often portrayed as having monstrous deformities, such as claw-like or thorny hands, flaming eyes or seven heads.

Just as with jinn, an ifrit might possess an individual. Such persons gain some abilities from the ifrit, such as getting stronger and braver, but the ifrit renders them insane. With the aid of a magical ring, the afarit might be forced to perform certain orders, such as carrying heavy stones.

=== Shabakism ===
A story circulates among the Shabak community in Kurdistan about a certain ifrit who incensed Ali by his evil nature long before the creation of Adam. (Note: It is a common belief among Muslims that Muhammad's creation precedes that of Adam. Shia sources, often add Ali to the human beings predating the creation of Adam and the earth.) Consequently, for the ifrit's wickedness, Ali chained the ifrit and left him alone. When the prophets arrived on earth, he appeared to all of them, beginning with Adam, and begged them for his release, but no prophet was able to break the chains. When Muhammad met the ifrit, he brought him to Ali for release. Ali was merciful to the ifrit, and decided to release him under the condition that he surrenders to the will of God.

=== Mahan and the Ifrit ===
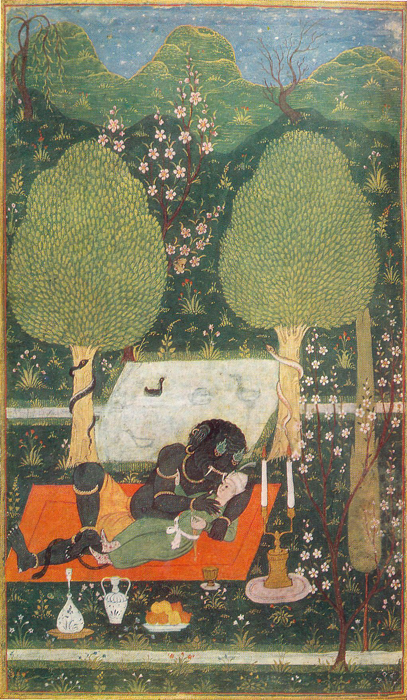
Māhān embraced by an ifrit. Illustration to Nizami Ganjavi's poem Hamsa. Bukhara, 1648.

Nizami Ganjavi (c. 1141–1209) narrates in his Haft Peykar the story of the Egyptian wayfarer Māhān (the "moonlike one") and his travels to a demon-infested desert. Māhān's horse, presented to him by a demon in human disguise, gallops his rider into the desert, where it turns into a seven-headed monster. In the desert, Māhān finds shelter in a mysterious oasis owned by an old man. After Māhān and the old man know each other better, the old man decides to bequeath his legacy and marry him to a beautiful woman. He leaves to prepare for the wedding and warns Māhān that he must not descend from the perch until the old man is back. After that, the house, garden, and wife will belong to him.

When a beautiful girl with the face of a parī (fairy) enters the room, Māhān is overwhelmed by his lust and passion and ignores the order of the old man. While the beauty of his desire embraces Māhān, the girl suddenly turns into an ifrit, formed from God's wrath. The demon explains that the fairy turned into a demon because of Māhān's uncontrollable passion. Thereupon, the ifrit explains that he now must tear Māhān apart; if it were to spare him, the monster would be no true demon (dēw). Furthermore, the ifrit, as a demon, is ashamed to have presented as a fairy in the first place. Māhān is saved when the rooster sounds in the morning and everything demonic vanishes.

Nizami notes that the meaning of the story is that the ifrit is the consequence of Māhān's moral transgression. The ifrits in the story feature as moral instance and guardians of moral order.

=== Traditional literature ===
Afarit appear already in early poems, such as those of Al-Maʿarri (973–1057), who describes his protagonist visiting a paradise with "narrow straits" and "dark valleys" for afarit, between heaven and hell. In later works, the afarit are mentioned among the narratives collected in One Thousand and One Nights. In one tale called "The Porter and the Young Girls", a prince is attacked by pirates and takes refuge with a woodcutter. The prince finds an underground chamber in the forest leading to a beautiful woman who has been kidnapped by an ifrit. The prince sleeps with the woman and both are attacked by the jealous ifrit, who changes the prince into an ape. Later a princess restores the prince and fights a pitched battle with the ifrit, who changes shape into various animals, fruit, and fire until being reduced to cinders. In "The Fisherman and the Jinni" an ifrit, locked in a jar by the Seal of Solomon, is released but later tricked by the fisherman again into the jar. Under the condition that the ifrit aids him to achieve riches, he releases the ifrit again. The latter ifrit, however, might be substituted by a marid, another type of powerful demon easily tricked by the protagonist. The latter portrayal of an ifrit, as a wish-granting spirit released from a jar, became characteristic of Western depictions of jinn.

== In fiction ==
Afarit feature frequently in film and video games. In the Final Fantasy video game series, an ifrit appears as a summonable spirit and an enemy. Like its mythological counterpart, it is a spirit of fire and can use an iconic spell called Hellfire. The Ifrit is also name dropped in Nuclear Option, being a plane called "KR-67 Ifrit." In the fifth season of True Blood (2012), an ifrit seeks vengeance for murder of Iraqi civilians by U.S. soldiers. In both the novel American Gods (2001) and the television adaptation by Neil Gaiman an ifrit disguised as a taxi-driver appears, trying to get used to his new role, seeking intimacy in a lonely world. An ifrit appears in season 2 episode 3 of the television series Evil and is ultimately excorcised with the help of a Muslim imam.

== See also ==
- Archdemon
- Dybbuk
- dīv
- Genie in popular culture
- Imp
- Oni
- Rakshasa
- Yūrei
- Zabaniyya
