= Rosier (demon) =

Fictional demon by Gustav Davidson

Rosier, according to the occultist Gustav Davidson in A Dictionary Of Angels (1967) is "a former lesser-rank angel of the order of dominations.", the cited source being Sebastien Michaelis' Admirable History of the Possession and Conversion of a Penitent Woman (1613).

Admirable History of the Possession and Conversion of a Penitent Woman is in public domain. Rosier exists on page 325 and is described as "the second in order of Dominations, and by his sweet and sugared words, he tempteth men to fall in love. His adversary in heaven is Basil, who would not listen to amorous and inchanting language.".

Rosier does not appear in the Bible or Apocrypha, and is not mentioned in the Catholic Encyclopedia or Britannica, but following Davidson's work of 1967. Rosier has been picked up in other occult books and in some popular culture.

== In popular culture ==
- Rosier features in the novel Mr Mee (2000) by Andrew Crumey, as creator of an esoteric work titled Rosier's Encyclopaedia. Crumey's subsequent novels Mobius Dick (2004) and The Secret Knowledge (2013) feature the Rosier Corporation, which is responsible for sinister experiments using quantum computers. The Secret Knowledge includes other characters with surnames from the Michaelis' classification of demons, e.g. Verrier, Carreau, Verrine and Oeillet.
- One of the main characters of Kaori Yuki's manga Angel Sanctuary is called Rosiel (also spelled Rociel, ロシエル in the original), and is named after the fallen angel (as stated by the author in a side note to volume 1). The different desinence is due to the uniformity of the [l] and [r] sounds in Japanese. However, there are other ideas as to why the name is spelled with an "l" rather than an "r". Rosiel, in Kaori Yuki's manga, Angel Sanctuary; the name difference due to Yuki ending the names of most angels with "el", meaning "god". When an angel turns away from god, they normally abandon the "el" in favour of "er".^{[See Volume 1]}
- Rene Rosier is depicted as an incubus and is lord of the incubi in the Cassandra Palmer series by Karen Chance.
- "Rene Rosier the Fallen" is the religious hero of the evil religion "Ashen Veil" in the Civilization 4: Beyond the Sword fantasy mod "Fall from Heaven 2". However, he is a human religious fighter who abandoned the good counterreligion "The Order".
- Rene Rosier is a character in The Eternal Ones by Kirsten Miller.
- Rene Rosier is the name of a demon of obsession in Big Finish's audio drama Dark Shadows: Tainted Love. He is able to possess people through their obsessions in order to try to break into our reality.
- Rosier is the main character in the story Santanic Rituals of the Greater Butler County Area on The No Sleep Podcast episode 16 season 13.
- Rosier is mentioned in the maudlin of the Well song, "The Curve that to an Angle Turn'd".
- Rosier is a character in Rafael Nicolás’ novel “Angels Before Man”, as well as the rest of the series. This includes "Angels and Man", "Horns for Hell", and "Angels After Man".

== See also ==
- Michaelis' classification of demons
- Hierarchy of devils
- Hierarchy of angels

== Sources ==
- Gavidson, Gustav, A Dictionary of Angels: Including the Fallen Angels, Free Press, 1994, ISBN 9780029070529
