= Belphegor =

One of the seven princes of Hell in demonology

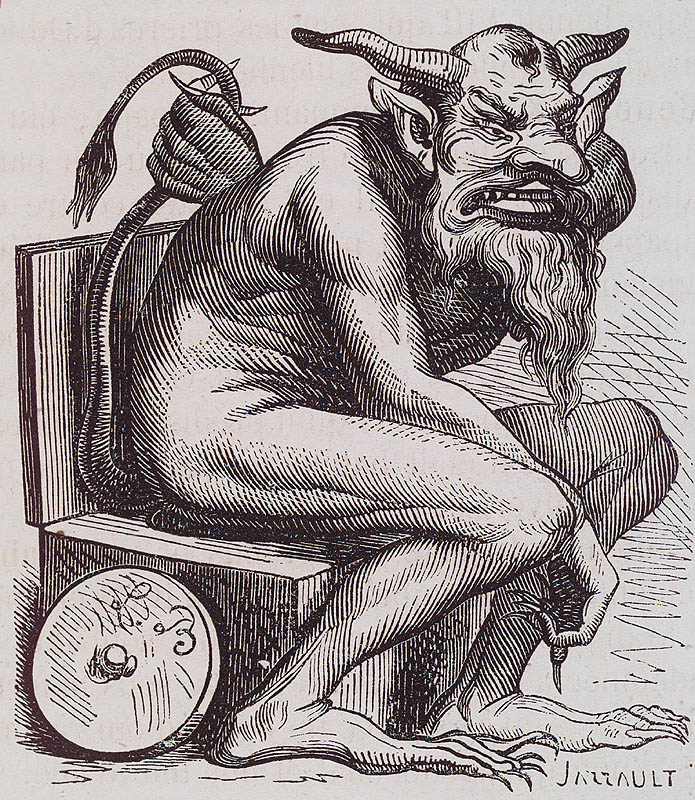
Depiction of the demon Belphégor, from J.A.S. Collin de Plancy, Dictionnaire Infernal, 1863

Belphegor (or Baal Peor, Biblical Hebrew: בַּעַל-פְּעוֹר, romanized: baʿal-pəʿōr, lit. 'Lord of the Gap') is, in Christianity, a demon associated with one of the seven deadly sins. In stories where he is invoked he bestows wealth, power to make discoveries, and the ability to create fantastic inventions. His role as a demon was to sow dispute between people, and to lead them to evil through the distribution of wealth. Belphegor has appeared frequently in lists and classifications of demons.

== History ==
Belphegor derives from Baal-Peor, a Baal worshipped at a high place in the Heresy at Peor, to whom the Israelites were associated in Shittim (Numbers 25:3) and who was associated with intemperance and orgies. He was worshiped in the form of a phallus. As a demon, he is described in Kabbalistic writings as "the one who quarrels", an enemy of the sixth sefira, Tiferet "Beauty". In the grimoire Key of Solomon, Belphegor is listed near the end of the book as a Syrian idol that is now destroyed.

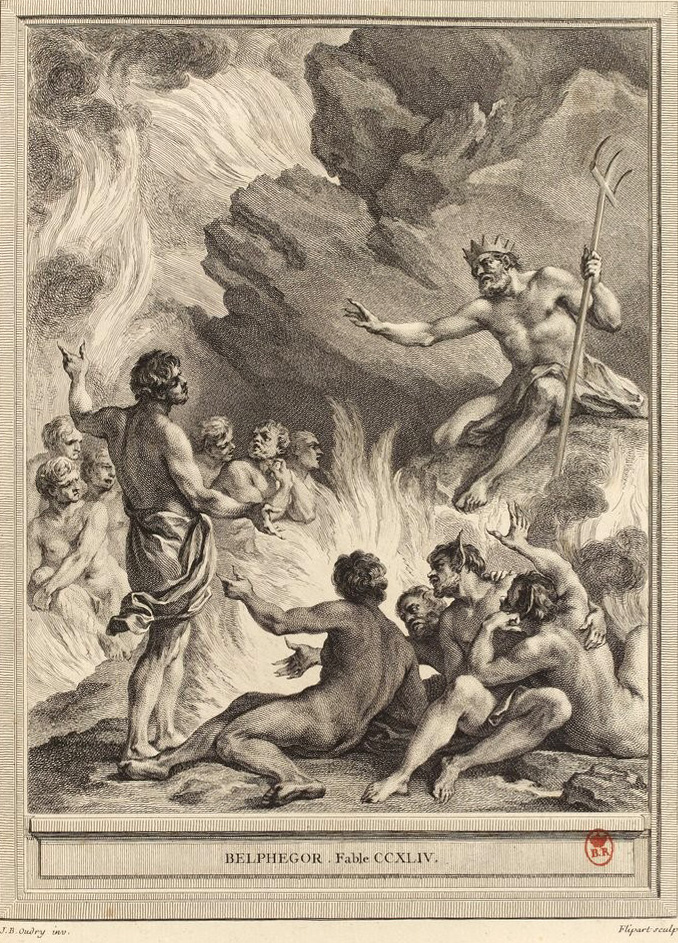
Belphegor by Jean Jacques Flipart

Peter Binsfeld (c. 1540 – c. 1600), the auxiliary bishop of Trier and a witch hunter, wrote that Belphegor tempts through laziness. According to Binsfeld's Classification of Demons, Belphegor is the main demon of sloth in the Christian tradition. The anonymous author of the Lollard work, The Lanterne of Light, however, believed Belphegor to embody gluttony rather than sloth. According to the 1818 Dictionnaire Infernal by Collin de Plancy, Belphegor was Hell's ambassador to France. As a result, his enemy is Mary Magdalene, one of the patron saints of France. According to some demonologists from the 17th century, his powers are strongest in April.

== Literature ==
The novella Belfagor arcidiavolo by Italian diplomat Niccolò Machiavelli was first published in 1549, and relates how the demon comes to earth to find a mate.

Belphegor figures in Paradise Lost by John Milton.

Next Chemos, th’ obscene dread of Moab’s sons,
From Aroar to Nebo, and the wild
Of southmost Abarim; in Hesebon
And Horonaim, Seon’s realm, beyond
The flow’ry dale of Sibma clad with vines,
And Eleale to th’ Asphaltic Pool.
Peor his other name, when he enticed
Israel in Sittim on their march from Nile
To do him wanton rites, which cost them woe.

Belphegor features in three narrative poems by Jean de la Fontaine, published in his 17th-century anthology Contes et nouvelles en vers (English: Tales and Novellas in Verse). Drawing from Machiavelli's Belfagor arcidiavolo, this satirical poetic cycle includes the eponymously-titled Belphegor, followed by La Clochette, and Le Glouton.

According to De Plancy's Dictionnaire Infernal, Belphegor was Hell's ambassador to France. The same claim was repeated by Victor Hugo in Toilers of the Sea.

The novella by Machiavelli became the basis for the opera Belfagor by Ottorino Respighi, which premiered at La Scala in Milan in 1923.

== In popular culture ==
- The PZL M-15 Belphegor, a 1970s Polish utility aeroplane, was named after the demon, due to its strange looks, the noise of its jet engine, and its unsuitability for crop dusting, for which it had been specifically designed.
- Belphegor appears as a supporting character in the TV show Supernatural. In the show, Belphegor possesses the body of Jack, played by Alexander Calvert.
- Belphegor is a recurring demon/persona in the Megami Tensei and Persona video game series.
- The long-running German dime novel and audio drama series John Sinclair featured Belphégor as a recurring villain. Author Jason Dark depicted Belphégor as an archdemon mainly active in Paris and a close ally of the Grim Reaper.
- In the Oz book Jack Pumpkinhead of Oz (1929) by Ruth Plumly Thompson, Baron Belfaygor of Bourne is a spoof of the Prince Charming stock character, seeking to rescue his damsel in distress from an enemy warlord. Purehearted but inept, Belfaygor requires assistance from other unlikely heroes, including the titular "Pumpkinhead". Despite his name, Belfaygor has no demonic attributes.
- The palindromic prime number 1000000000000066600000000000001 is known as Belphegor's prime, due to the superstitious significance of the numbers it contains. Belphegor's prime number consists of the number 666, surrounded on both sides by thirteen zeros and finally one one.
