= Raum =

Goetic demon

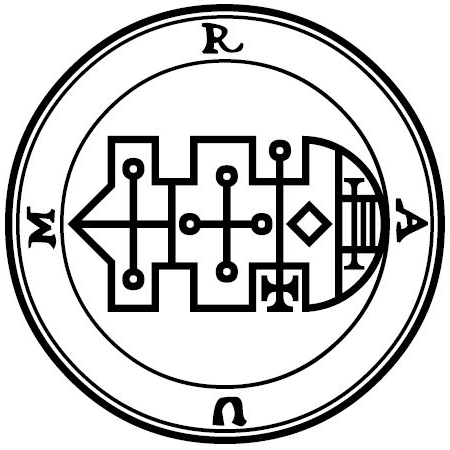
The seal of Raum as found in the Pseudomonarchia Daemonum and Ars Goetia.

In demonology, Raum (also Raim, Raym, Räum) is a Great Earl or Count of Hell, ruling thirty legions of demons. He is depicted as a crow which adopts human form at the request of the conjurer. In the Shem Hamephorash Raum is ruled over by the 40th angel of the Kabbalah Leiazel (ייזאל).

== Etymology ==
Raum is a word derived from German, and means space, room, chamber; räumen means to vacate, empty, evacuate.

Other spellings include Raim, Raym, and Räum.

== Characteristics ==
Raum steals treasures out of kings' houses, carrying them wherever the magician wishes, and destroys cities and dignities of men (he is said to have great dispraise for dignities). Raum can also tell things past, present and future, reconcile friends and foes, and invoke love.

"Raum, Reym (Rey) or Raim is a great earle, he is seene as a crowe, but when he putteth on humane shape, at the commandement of the exorcist, he stealeth woonderfullie out of the kings house, and carrieth it whether he is assigned, he destroieth cities, and hath great despite unto dignities, he knoweth things present, past, and to come, and reconcileth freends and foes, he was of the order of thrones, and governeth thirtie legions."

— Johann Weyer, Pseudomonarchia Daemonum

== In popular culture ==
In the online video game League of Legends, the character Swain tricked the demon 'Raum' in to giving him his power. In the game he is characterized as being the Demon of secrets and knowledge.

The homebrew Dungeons and Dragons campaign setting Crooked Moon, created by popular live play podcast group Legends of Avantris, features a demonic entity known as Raum, the Harvest Terror. This Raum, also known as Virgil, possesses a living scarecrow, and is a Demon of secrets.

In the anime and manga series Welcome to Demon School! Iruma-kun, Raim is a succubus who is also a teacher.

Raum is also the name of a daemon in the Horus Heresy book series that possessed the Word Bearer Argel Tal.

In the online video game Paladins (video game), Raum is a playable character.

Raum is also featured as a character in the Hell Bent series, by Aurora Ascher.

== See also ==
- The Lesser Key of Solomon, a 17th-century text which references Raum
- Gustav Davidson
