= Halphas =

Goetic demon

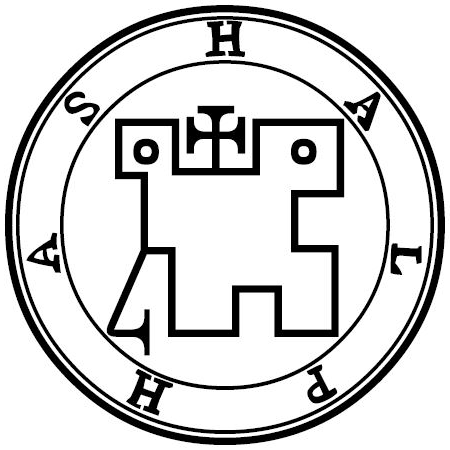
Seal of Halphus

In demonology, Halphas (listed in Skinner & Rankine's edition as Malthas, and in the Crowley/Mathers edition as Halphas, Malthus, or Malphas) is the thirty-eighth demon in the Ars Goetia in the Lesser Key of Solomon (forty-third in Johann Weyer's Pseudomonarchia Daemonum), ranked as an earl.

Most manuscripts describe Halphas as a hoarse-voiced stock dove (though Weyer and Collin de Plancy's Dictionnaire Infernal describe him as a stork), who supplies weapons and ammunition for towers (Weyer and de Plancy have "towns" or "villes" instead), sends men to war, and commands 26 legions of spirits.

According to Skinner & Rankine, Halphas is opposed by the Shemhamphorasch angel Haamiah.

== See also ==
- Goetia

== Sources ==
- Peterson, Joseph H., ed. (May 2001). Lemegeton Clavicula Salomonis: The Lesser Key of Solomon, Detailing the Ceremonial Art of Commanding Spirits Both Good and Evil;. Maine: Weiser Books (published 2001). ISBN 1-57863-220-X.
- de Plancy, Jacques Collin (1853). Dictionnaire infernal (in French). Paris: Sagnier et Bray.
- Skinner, Stephen; Rankine, David (2010). The Goetia of Dr Rudd : the angels & demons of Liber malorum spirituum seu Goetia Lemegeton clavicula Salomonis : with a study of the techniques of evocation in the context of the angel magic tradition of the seventeenth century. Singapore: Golden Hoard, distributed by Llewellyn Worldwide. ISBN 978-0-9547639-2-3. OCLC 665072905.
- Weyer, Johann (1563). Peterson, Joseph H. (ed.). Pseudomonarchia Daemonum (Liber officiorum spirituum). Twilit Grotto: Esoteric Archives (published 2000).
