= Gaap =

Cardinal spirit

Seal of Gaap (Ars Goetia)

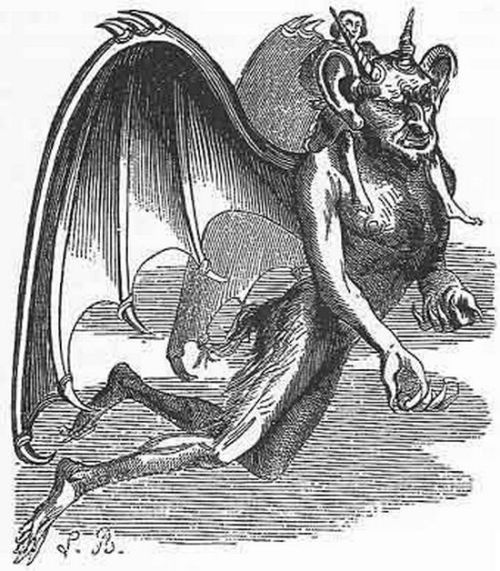
Gaap, by Louis Le Breton, 1863

Gaap (also Tap, Coap, Taob or Goap) is a demon that is described in demonological grimoires such as the Lesser Key of Solomon, Johann Weyer's Pseudomonarchia Daemonum, and the Munich Manual of Demonic Magic, as well as Jacques Collin de Plancy's Dictionnaire Infernal.

== Demon ==
These works describe Gaap as a prince in human form who incites love. The Munich Manual also says that "Taob" also provides medical care for women, transforms them to make it easier to get to a lover, renders them infertile, and rules twenty-five legions of spirits. The other sources instead describe Gaap as a president, giving him the power to teach philosophy and liberal arts, make others invisible, steal familiars from other magicians, make men stupid, and carry men between kingdoms; in addition to ruling sixty-six legions of demons. Johann Weyer also connects Gaap to necromancers, and states that he was first called upon by Noah's son Ham, along with Beleth. He was of the order of potestates.

Gaap (or Goap) is also one of the four cardinal spirits, of the south in the Lesser Key of Solomon, the west in the Pseudomonarchia Daemonum.

In the Livre des Esperitz, Gaap (as Caap) is still a prince, but appears as a knight, brings gold and silver anywhere, and rules twenty legions of spirits.

According to Thomas Rudd, Gaap is opposed by the Shem HaMephorash angel Ieuiah.

== See also ==
- Amaymon – the cardinal spirit of the east in The Lesser Key of Solomon
- Corson (demon) – the cardinal spirit of the west in The Lesser Key of Solomon
- Ziminiar – the cardinal spirit of the north in The Lesser Key of Solomon
