= Peter Binsfeld =

German bishop and theologian

Peter Binsfeld (alternate spelling Peter of Binsfeld, lat. Petrus Binsfeldius; born c. 1540 – died 1598 or 1603) was a German auxiliary bishop and theologian. The son of a farmer and craftsman, was born in the village of Binsfeld in the rural Eifel region, located in the modern state of Rhineland-Palatinate; he died in Trier as a victim of the bubonic plague. Binsfeld grew up in the predominantly Catholic environment of the Eifel region.

== Education and career ==
Considered by a local abbot to be a very gifted boy, Binsfeld was sent to Rome for study. After completing his studies, Binsfeld returned to his home region and became a prominent figure in the anti-Protestant Counter-Reformation of the late 16th century. He was elected auxiliary bishop of Trier and became a well-known writer on theology, who achieved notoriety as one of the most prominent witch hunters of his time. Binsfeld was one of the main drivers of the Trier witch trials that ravaged the area under the dominion of Archbishop Johann von Schönenberg between 1581-93. Binsfeld wrote the influential treatise De confessionibus maleficorum et sagarum ('Of the Confessions of Warlocks and Witches'), translated into several languages (Trier, 1589). This work discussed the confessions of alleged witches and claimed that even if such confessions were produced by torture, they should still be believed. He also encouraged denouncements.

He believed girls under age twelve and boys under age fourteen could not be considered guilty of practising witchcraft, but due to the precocity of some children the law could not be universally applied. This point of view can be considered as moderate, taking into account that some tribunals had condemned children between two and five years of age to be burnt at the stake. Contrary to other authors of the time, Binsfeld doubted the ability of shapeshifting and the validity of the witch's mark.

In 1589, Binsfield published an influential list of demons and their associated sins, including the demons associated with the seven deadly sins: Lucifer (pride), Mammon (greed), Asmodeus (lust), Leviathan (envy), Beelzebub (gluttony), Satan (wrath) and Belphegor (sloth).

== See also ==
- Classification of demons
