= Myiagros =

Divine figure who warded off flies

In ancient Greek religion, Myiagros (Ancient Greek: Μυίαγρος Muíagros 'Fly-Catcher') or Myacoris was a cult title for a divine figure who warded off flies. It could be used as an epithet for either a divinity or a hero.

Pausanias characterizes Myiagros as a divinized mortal who received an offering preliminary to the main sacrifice for Athene at Alipheira in Arcadia. The intention was to ward off flies in advance of an animal sacrifice, which might be expected to attack them to its detriment. Aelian says the advance offering was made to the flies themselves.

The Alipheiran cult was perhaps influenced by rites in Elis at Olympia. The Eleans made sacrifices either to the flies themselves, or to a Zeus Apomyios ("Shoo-Fly Zeus") or a god named Myiodes or Myiakores. There was a similar ritual among the Akarnanians. An Elean myth told of how Herakles was troubled by flies when he was trying to sacrifice at Olympia, and was instructed in how to sacrifice to the Zeus who shoos away flies (Ἀπόμυιος), so that the flies were at once driven across the Alpheus. In cultivating Apollo at Leucas, a similar preliminary rite was enacted.

Pliny says that when a swarm of flies is causing disease (pestilentia), the Eleans invoke Myacoris, and once the god has approved and accepted the sacrifice, the flies die immediately.

The cult title can sometimes be found in older exegesis on Beelzebub understood as "Lord of the Flies."

== Ancient sources ==
- Pausanias 8.26.7 and 5.14.1.
- Antiphanes, frg. 229/30 K (preserved by Athenaeus 1).
- Pliny, Natural History 10.40 (=28).
- Aelian, Historiae Animalium 5.17 and 10/11.8
- Heraclides Ponticus, as cited by Clement of Alexandria, Protrepticon 2.38.33P
- Solinus, Polyhistor, 1.10
