= Al-Ibshihi =

Egyptian writer

Al-Ibshīhī (Arabic: مُحمَّد بن أحمد بن منصور الأبشيهي المحلي) (1388–1448) was an Egyptian writer born in the small town in the Governorate of Gharbeya, in the Nile Delta.

== Works ==
Al-Ibshīhī's best known work is the Kitāb al-Mustaṭraf more fully known as Mustaṭraf fī kull fann mustaẓraf ('A Quest for Attainment in Each Fine Art'). As characterised by the Encyclopædia Britannica, this was 'a very individual encyclopaedia ... that covered the Islamic religion, conduct, law, spiritual qualities, work, natural history, music, food, and medicine. At the turn of the Arab fortunes, al-Ibshīhī had recapitulated all that was best in their culture'.

=== Editions ===
- al-Ibshīhī. al-Mustaṭraf fī kull fann mustaẓraf. 2 vols. Beirut: Dār Maktabat al-Ḥayāh, 1992.

== See also ==
- Ibn Inabah
