= Beelzebub =

Satan, or type of demon

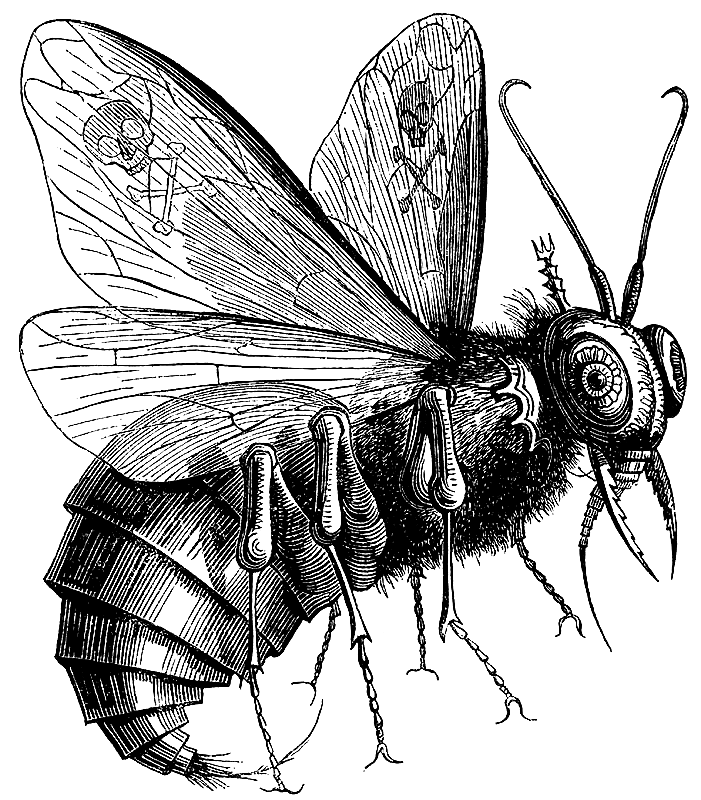
Beelzebub's appearance from the Dictionnaire Infernal, akin to a fly

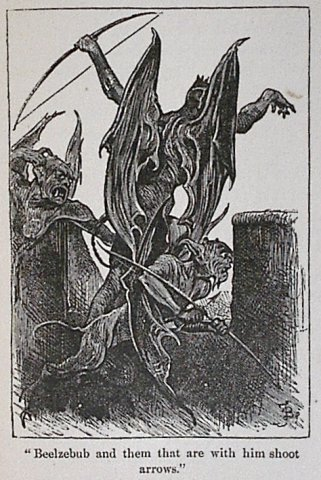
"Beelzebub and them that are with him shoot arrows" from John Bunyan's The Pilgrim's Progress (1678)

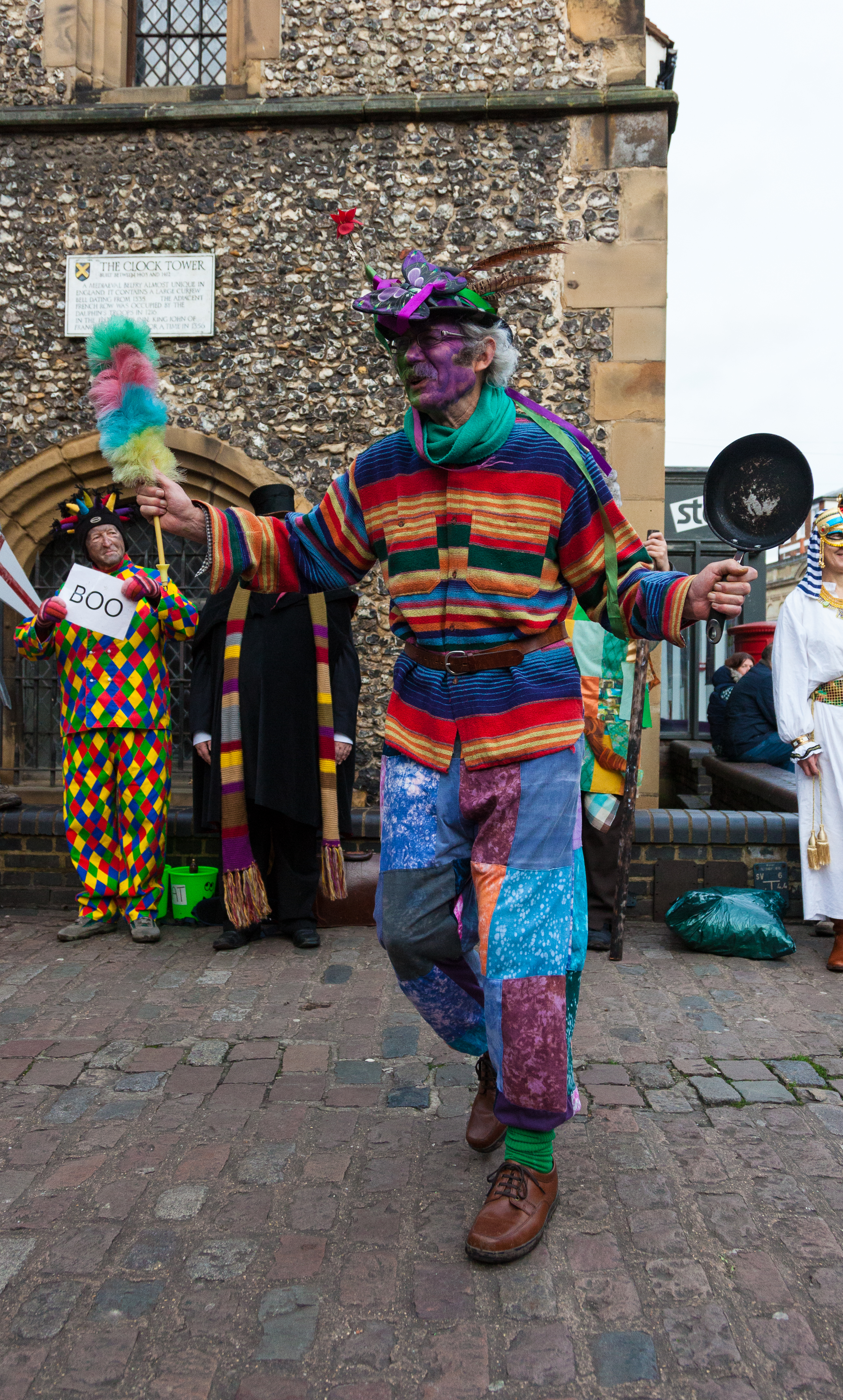
Beelzebub as a character in the mumming play St George and the Dragon by the St Albans Mummers, 2015

Ba'al Zabub, Ba'al Zvuv or Beelzebub (/biːˈɛlzəbʌb, ˈbiːl-/ bee-EL-zə-bub, BEEL-; Hebrew: בַּעַל־זְבוּב Baʿal-zəḇūḇ), also spelled Beelzebul or Belzebuth, and occasionally known as the Lord of the Flies, is a name derived from a Philistine god, formerly worshipped in Ekron, and later adopted by some Abrahamic religions as a major demon. The name Beelzebub is associated with the Canaanite god Baal.

Beelzebub is known in demonology as one of the seven deadly demons or seven princes of Hell, Beelzebub representing gluttony and envy. The Dictionnaire Infernal describes Beelzebub as a being capable of flying, known as the "Lord of the Flies", "Lord of the Flyers", or the "Lord of the Flying Demons". He is also referenced in the novel Lord of the Flies by William Golding due to his ties to hell and the themes of the book.

== Judaism ==
=== Hebrew Scriptures ===
The source for the name Beelzebub is in the Books of Kings (2 Kings 1:2–3, 6, 16), written Baʿal zəvuv, referring to a deity worshipped by the Philistines in the city of Ekron.

This passage notes that King Ahaziah of the Northern Kingdom of Israel, after seriously injuring himself in a fall, sent messengers to inquire of Baʿal-zəvuv, the god of the Philistine city of Ekron, to learn if he would recover.

Ahaziah fell through the lattice in his upper chamber at Samaria and was injured. So he sent messengers, whom he instructed: "Go inquire of Baal-zebub, the god of Ekron, whether I shall recover from this injury."

— "II Kings 1:2". www.sefaria.org.

Elijah then condemned Ahaziah to die by God's words because Ahaziah sought counsel from Baʿal-zəvuv rather than from God.

3 But an angel of GOD said to Elijah the Tishbite, "Go and confront the messengers of the king of Samaria and say to them, 'Is there no God in Israel that you go to inquire of Baal-zebub, the god of Ekron? 4 Assuredly, thus said GOD: You shall not rise from the bed you are lying on, but you shall die.'" And Elijah went.

— "II Kings 1:3-4". www.sefaria.org.

=== Testament of Solomon ===
In the Testament of Solomon, Beelzebul (not Beelzebub) appears as prince of the demons and says that he was formerly a leading heavenly angel who was associated with the star Hesperus (the normal Greek name for the planet Venus (Aphrodite, Αφροδíτη) as evening star). Seemingly, Beelzebul here is synonymous with Lucifer. Beelzebul claims to cause destruction through tyrants, to cause demons to be worshipped among men, to excite priests to lust, to cause jealousies in cities and murders, and to bring about war. The Testament of Solomon is an Old Testament pseudepigraphical work, purportedly written by King Solomon, in which the author mostly describes particular demons whom he enslaved to help build Solomon's Temple, with substantial Christian interpolations.

=== Rabbinical literature ===
Rabbinical literature commentary equates the Baʿal-zəvuv of Ekron as lord of the "fly". The word Baʿal-zəvuv in rabbinical texts is a mockery of the worship of Baal, which ancient Hebrews considered to be idol worship.

Jewish scholars have interpreted the title of "Lord of the Flies" as the Hebrew way of calling Baʿal a pile of excrement, and comparing Ba'al followers to flies.

== Christianity ==
=== Christian Bible ===
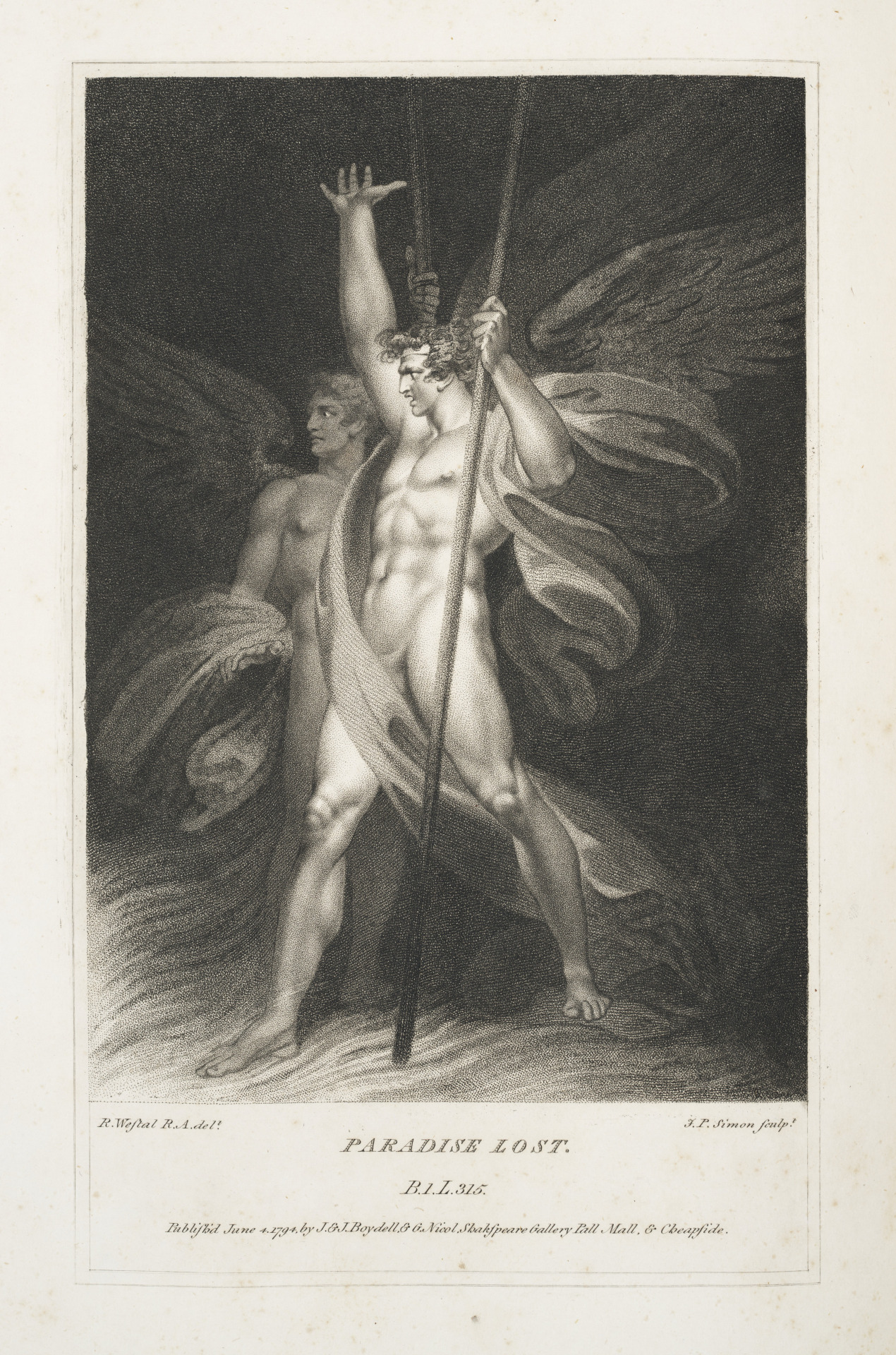
Satan and Beelzebub, the captains of Hell in Paradise Lost by John Milton

In Mark 3:22, the scribes accuse Jesus Christ of driving out demons by the power of Beelzebul, the prince of demons. The name also appears in the expanded version in Matthew 12:24,27 and Luke 11:15, 18–19, as well as in Matthew 10:25.

Jesus knew their thoughts and said to them, "Every kingdom divided against itself will be ruined, and every city or household divided against itself will not stand. If Satan drives out Satan, he is divided against himself. How then can his kingdom stand? And if I drive out demons by Beelzebul, by whom do your people drive them out? So then, they will be your judges. But if I drive out demons by the Spirit of God, then the kingdom of God has come upon you."

—Matthew 12:25–28

Beelzebub is also identified in the New Testament as the Devil, "the prince of demons". Recognizing translation concerns, biblical scholar Thomas Kelly Cheyne suggested that it might be a derogatory corruption of Ba'al-zəbûl, "Lord of the High Place" (i.e., Heaven) or "High Lord".

=== Gnostic tradition ===
Texts of the Gospel of Nicodemus vary; Beelzebul and Beelzebub are used interchangeably. The name is used by Hades as a secondary name for the Devil, but it may vary with each translation of the text; other versions separate Beelzebub from the Devil.

According to the teachings of the Modern Gnostic Movement of Samael Aun Weor, Beelzebub was a prince of demons who rebelled against the Black Lodge during World War II and was converted by Aun Weor to the White Lodge.

=== Christian tradition ===
Not only had the Pharisees disparagingly accused Jesus of using Beelzebub's demonic powers to heal people (Luke 11:14–26), but others have been labelled possessed for acts of an extreme nature. Down through history, Beelzebub has been held responsible for many cases of demonic possession, such as that of Sister Madeleine de Demandolx de la Palud, Aix-en-Provence in 1611, whose relationship with Father Jean-Baptiste Gaufridi led not only to countless traumatic events at the hands of her inquisitors but also to the torture and execution of that "bewitcher of young nuns", Gaufridi himself. Beelzebub was also imagined to be sowing his influence in Salem, Massachusetts; his name came up repeatedly during the Salem witch trials, the last large-scale public expression of witch hysteria in either North America or Europe, and afterwards, the Rev. Cotton Mather wrote a pamphlet titled Of Beelzebub and his Plot.

=== Occult tradition ===
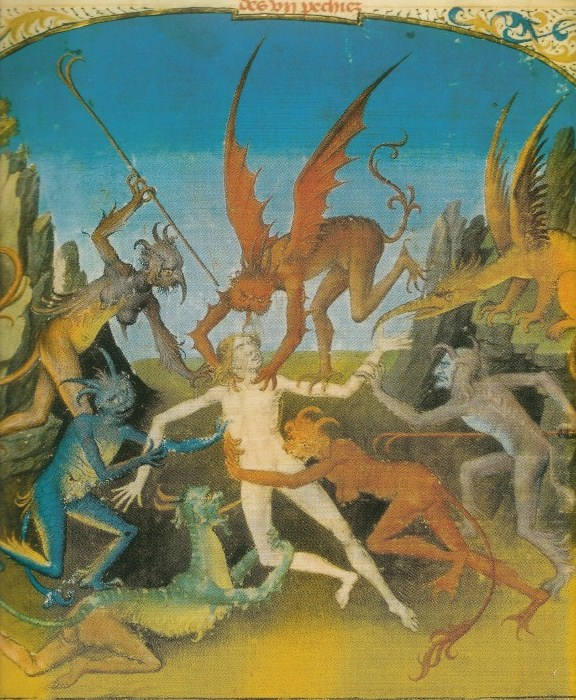
Man being attacked by devils and demons

Beelzebub is commonly described as placed high in Hell's hierarchy. According to the stories of the 16th-century occultist Johann Weyer, Beelzebub led a successful revolt against the Devil. Similarly, the 17th-century exorcist Sébastien Michaëlis, in his Admirable History (1612), placed Beelzebub among the three most prominent fallen angels, the other two being Lucifer and Leviathan. John Milton, in his epic poem Paradise Lost, first published in 1667, identified an unholy trinity consisting of Beelzebub, Lucifer, and Astaroth, with Beelzebub as the second-ranking of the many fallen angels. Milton wrote of Beelzebub "than whom, Satan except, none higher sat." Beelzebub is also a character in John Bunyan's The Pilgrim's Progress, first published in 1678. In 1409–1410 The Lanterne of Light (an anonymous English Lollard tract often attributed to John Wycliffe) provided a classification of the princes of Hell based on the seven deadly sins and associated Beelzebub with the deadly sin of envy. However, Sebastien Michaelis associated Beelzebub with the deadly sin of pride, one of the other seven deadly sins, and according to Peter Binsfeld in his 1589 Treatise on Confessions by Evildoers and Witches Beelzebub was the demon of gluttony, whereas Francis Barrett asserted that Beelzebub was the prince of idolatry.

== Translation concerns ==
It is unknown whether Symmachus the Ebionite was correct in identifying these names. Zeboul might derive from a slurred pronunciation of zebûb; from zebel, a word used to mean "dung" in the Targums; or from Hebrew zebûl found in 1 Kings 8:13 in the phrase bêt-zebûl, "lofty house". The Septuagint renders the name as Baalzebub (Βααλζεβούβ) and as Baal muian (Βααλ μυῗαν, "Baal of flies"). However, Symmachus may have reflected a tradition of its offensive ancient name when he rendered it as Beelzeboul.

In any case, the form Beelzebub was substituted for Beelzeboul in the Syriac translation and Latin Vulgate translation of the gospels, and this substitution was repeated in the King James Version, the resulting form Beelzeboul being mostly unknown to Western European and descendant cultures until some more recent translations restored it.

Alternatively to Baʿal zəvuv, the deity's actual name could have been Baʿal zəvul, "lord of the (heavenly) dwelling", and Baʿal zəvuv could have been a derogatory pun used by the Israelites.

In Arabic translations, the name is rendered as Baʿl-zabūl (بعلزبول).

== Etymology ==
The title Baal means "Lord" in the ancient Ugaritic and Cananitic languages and was used as a title for various local gods, often preceding the descriptive name of a specific god. The name Baʿal zəvuv appears in the Hebrew Bible as the god of the Philistine city of Ekron, but opinions differ on what the name means . In one understanding, Baʿal zəvuv is translated literally as lord of (the) flies. It was long ago suggested that there was a relationship between the Philistine god, and cults of flies, referring to a view of those cults as pests, feasting on excrement. This is similar to Hellenic gods such as Zeus Apomyios or Myiagros (“fly-averting Zeus”) who were thought to protect people from pest insects. A Ugaritic text depicts Ba'al expelling flies, which are the cause of a person's sickness.

According to Francesco Saracino (1982) the evidence is inconclusive, but the linguistic structure of the name Baʿal zəvuv resembles how other divine names were formed in the wider Mediterranean world. This supports the possibility that the name reflects a genuine local deity of Ekron; perhaps one associated with healing, as implied by the story in 2 Kings 1:2–3, where King Ahaziah sends messengers to consult Baʿal zəvuv about his recovery from an injury.

== See also ==
- Baal Hammon
- Baal-zephon
- Bohemian Rhapsody
