= Amaymon =

Prince of hell

In demonology, Amaymon (also Amaimon, or Amoymon) is a prince of Hell, and, according to some grimoires, the only one who has power over Asmodai.

A curious characteristic of this spirit is alleged in almost all copies of the Ars Goetia in English, that during the evocation of Asmodai to visible appearance, the exorcist must stand upright with his cap or headdress removed in a show of respect, because if he does not do so, then Amaymon will deceive him and doom all of his work. According to Joseph H. Peterson, editor of "The Lesser Key of Solomon" (Weiser 2001) this is a "bizarre translation of 'si vero coopertus fuerit'" (Page 21 Footnote 57) by Scot in his "Discoverie of Witchcraft" which contains a translation by Scot of Pseudomonarchia Daemonum by Johannes Weyer. Peterson's edition includes as an appendix, a copy of Weyer's Pseudomonarchia Daemonum in the original Latin where we find (Page 242) "Cum hujus officia exercet exorcista, fit fortis, cautus & in pedibus stans: si vero coopertus fuerit, ut in omnibus detegatur, efficiet: Quod si non fecerit exorcista, ab Amaymone in cunctis decipietur" which translates to "When the exorcist performs his offices, he should be strong, cautious and standing on his feet: if he will be truly overwhelmed he will bring it about that in all things he is unprotected: But if the exorcist does not, by Amaymon he will be deceived in whole."

In the original text by Johannes Weyer, there is nothing about taking off caps or headdresses when evoking Asmodeus. The curious characteristic replicated in every known English text of the Ars Goetia seems to arise from laziness on the part of Scot and generations of scribes replicating the English text without checking the original Latin.

Amaymon is said to have a deadly poisonous breath. The Lesser Key of Solomon states that the exorcist or conjurer must be in possession of a silver ring, that is duly consecrated and worn on the middle finger, as a form of protection against this poisonous astral breath.

According to Pseudomonarchia Daemonum and The Lesser Key of Solomon, Amaymon is the king of the east, while in the Liber Officiorum Spirituum and the 18th century grimoire Clavis Inferni he is stated to be the king of the south.

In The Book of the Sacred Magic of Abramelin the Mage, translated by S.L. MacGregor Mathers, Amaymon (as Amaimon) is still the king of the south and also one of the eight sub-princes, described as an Egyptian devil, who Abramelin restrained from working evil from the third hour until noon and from the ninth hour until evening.

== In popular culture ==
- Amaymon is portrayed as a beastlike man in the anime and manga series Welcome to Demon School! Iruma-kun.
- Amaimon appears as one of the eight demon kings in the anime and manga series Blue Exorcist

== See also ==
- Corson (demon) – the cardinal spirit of the west in The Lesser Key of Solomon
- Gaap – the cardinal spirit of the south in The Lesser Key of Solomon
- Ziminiar – the cardinal spirit of the north in The Lesser Key of Solomon
