= Beleth =

King of Hell in demonology

Seal of Beleth (Ars Goetia)

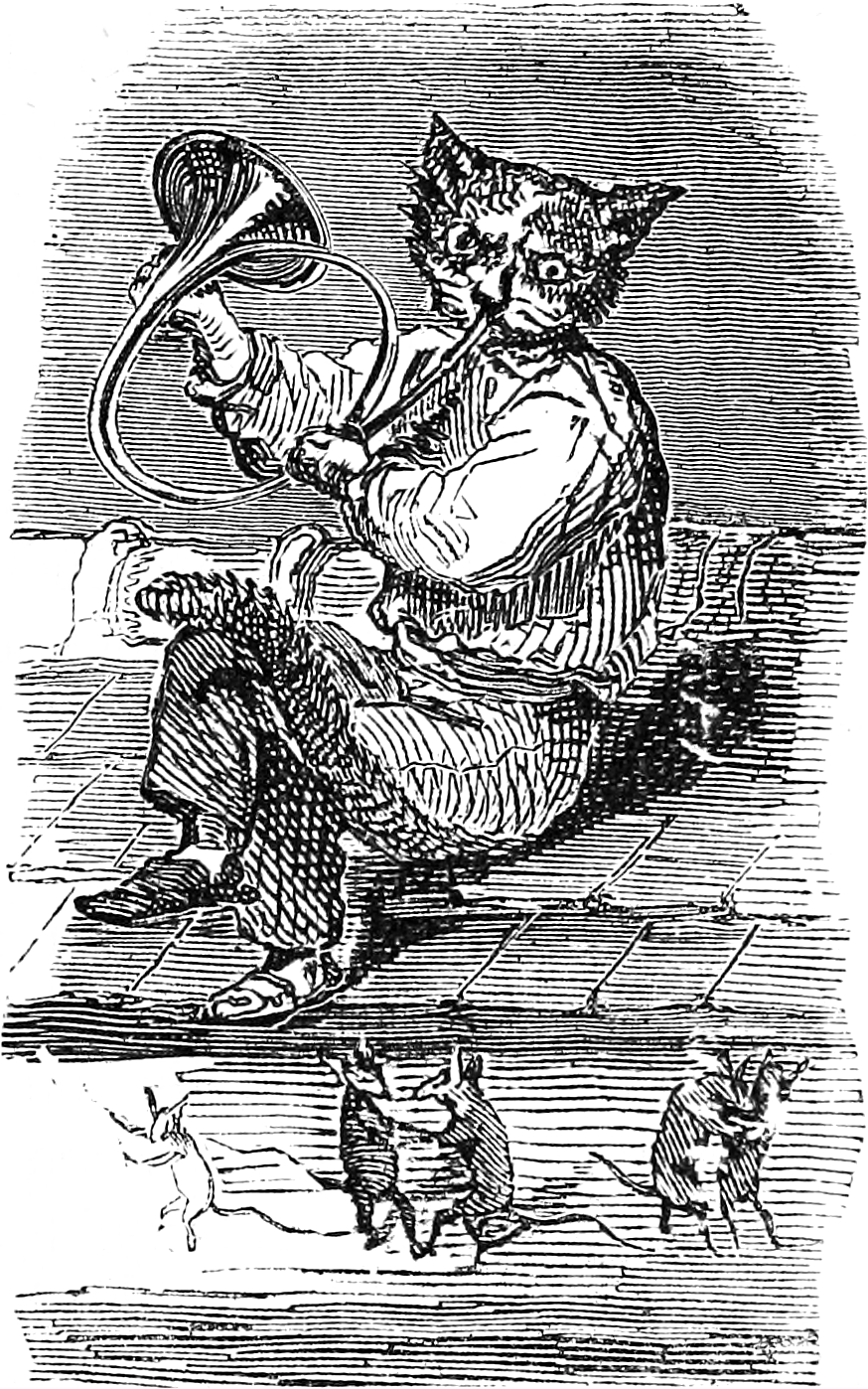
Byleth, an illustration from the Dictionnaire Infernal by Jacques Collin de Plancy

In demonology, Beleth, also spelled Bilet, Bileth, Byleth, or Bilith, is a king of Hell who has eighty-five legions of demons under his command. He rides a pale horse, and a variety of music is heard before him, according to most authors on demonology and the most known grimoires.

According to Pseudomonarchia Daemonum, Noah's son Ham was the first in invoking him after the flood, and wrote a book on mathematics with his help.

When appearing, he looks fierce in order to frighten the conjurer or to see if they are courageous. The conjurer must be brave, and hazel wand in hand, must draw a triangle by striking towards the south, east, and upwards, then commanding Beleth into it by means of some conjurations. He can bind both men and women in "foolish" or obsessive love until the will of the conjurer is fulfilled.

The Dictionnaire Infernal states that to summon Beleth, the person should hold a silver ring on the middle finger of the left hand against their face, to pay respect to Beleth's rank as king.

== See also ==
- The Lesser Key of Solomon
