= Demonology =

Study of demons or beliefs about demons

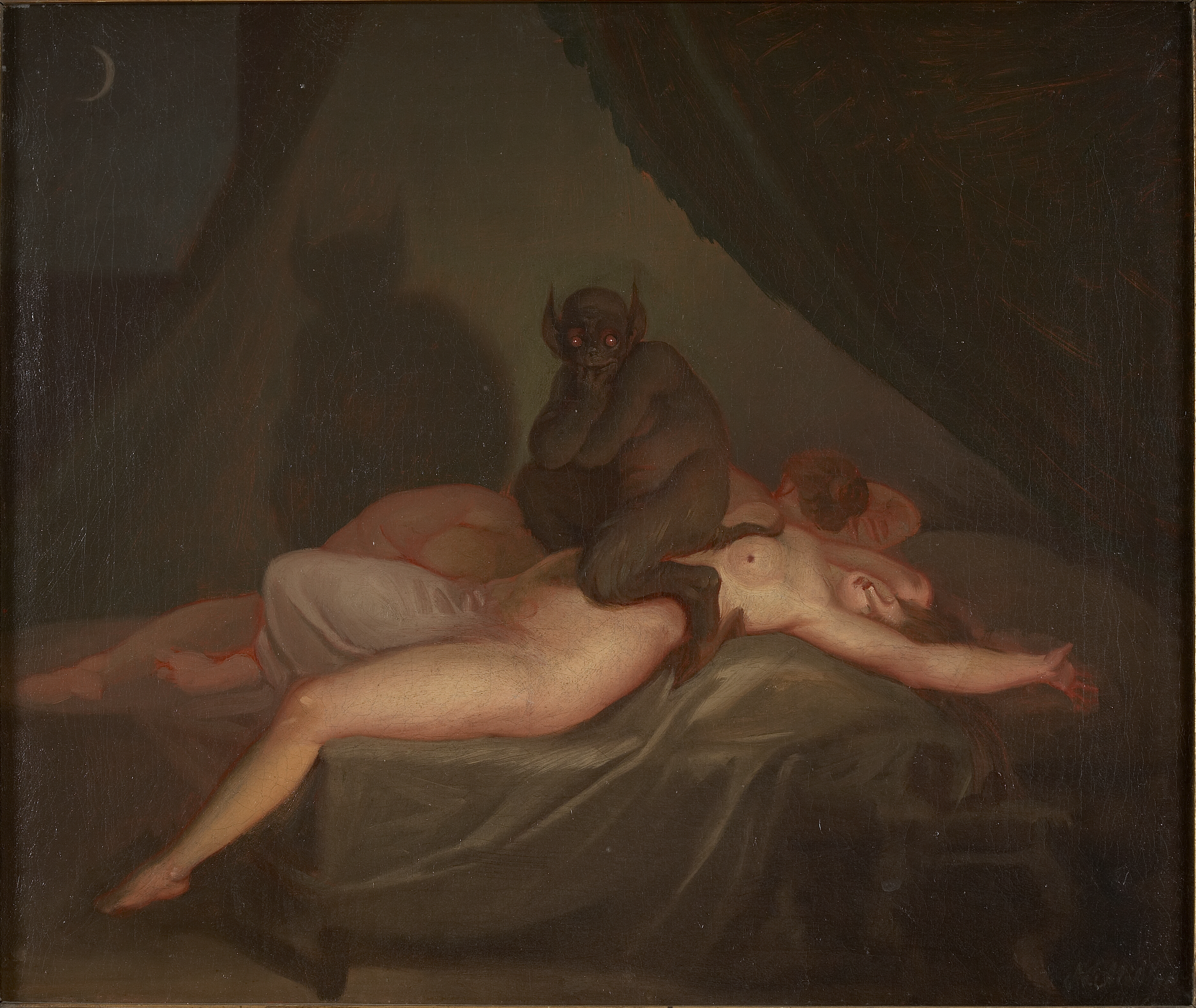
The Nightmare (1800) by Nicolai Abildgaard depicting a demon

Demonology (/ˌdiː.mən.ˈɒl.ə.dʒi/, DEE-mən-ALL-ə-jee) is the study of demons within religious belief and myth. Depending on context, it can refer to studies within theology, religious doctrine, or occultism. In many faiths, it concerns the study of a hierarchy of demons. Demons may be nonhuman separable souls, or discarnate spirits which have never inhabited a body. A sharp distinction is often drawn between these two classes, notably by the Melanesians, several African groups, and others. The jinns, for example, are not reducible to modified human souls. At the same time, these classes are frequently conceived as producing identical results, e.g., diseases.

== Prevalence of demons ==
According to some religions, all the affairs of the universe are supposed to be under the control of spirits, each ruling a certain "element" or even object, and themselves in subjection to a greater spirit. For example, the Inuit are said to believe in spirits of the sea, earth and sky, the winds, the clouds, and everything in nature. Every cove of the seashore, every point, every island, and prominent rock has its guardian spirit. Some are potentially of the malignant type, to be propitiated by an appeal to knowledge of the supernatural. Traditional Korean belief posits that countless demons inhabit the natural world; they fill household objects and are present in all locations. By the thousands, they accompany travellers, seeking them out from their places in the elements.

Greek philosophers such as Porphyry of Tyre (who claimed influence from Platonism), as well as the fathers of the Christian Church, held that the world was pervaded with spirits, the latter of whom advanced the belief that demons received the worship directed at pagan gods.

== Characterization of spirits ==
Not all spirits across all cultures are considered malevolent. In Central Africa, the Mpongwe believe in local spirits, just as the Inuit do; but they are regarded as inoffensive in the main. Passers-by must make some nominal offering as they near the spirits' residence. The occasional mischievous act, such as the throwing down of a tree on a passer-by, is believed by the natives to be perpetuated by the class of spirits known as Ombuiri.

Many spirits, especially those regarding natural processes, are often considered neutral or benevolent; ancient European peasant fears of the corn-spirit would crop up during irritation, as a result of the farmer infringing on the domain of said spirit, and taking his property by cutting the corn; similarly, there is no reason why the less significant pantheon should be regarded as malevolent, and historical evidence has shown that the Petara of the Dyaks are viewed as invisible guardians of mankind rather than hostile malefactors.

== Types ==
Demons are generally classified as spirits that are believed to enter into relations with the human race. As such, the term includes:

1. angels that, in Christian tradition, fell from grace;
2. malevolent genii or familiars;
3. spirits such as receive a cult (e.g., ancestor worship);
4. ghosts or other malevolent revenants.

Excluded are souls conceived as inhabiting another world. Yet just as gods are not necessarily spiritual, demons may also be regarded as corporeal; vampires, for example, are sometimes described as human heads with appended entrails, which issue from the tomb to attack the living during the night watches. The incubi and succubi of the Middle Ages are sometimes regarded as spiritual beings; but they were held to give proof of their bodily existence, such as offspring (though often deformed). Belief in demons goes back many millennia.

=== Ancient Mesopotamian religion ===
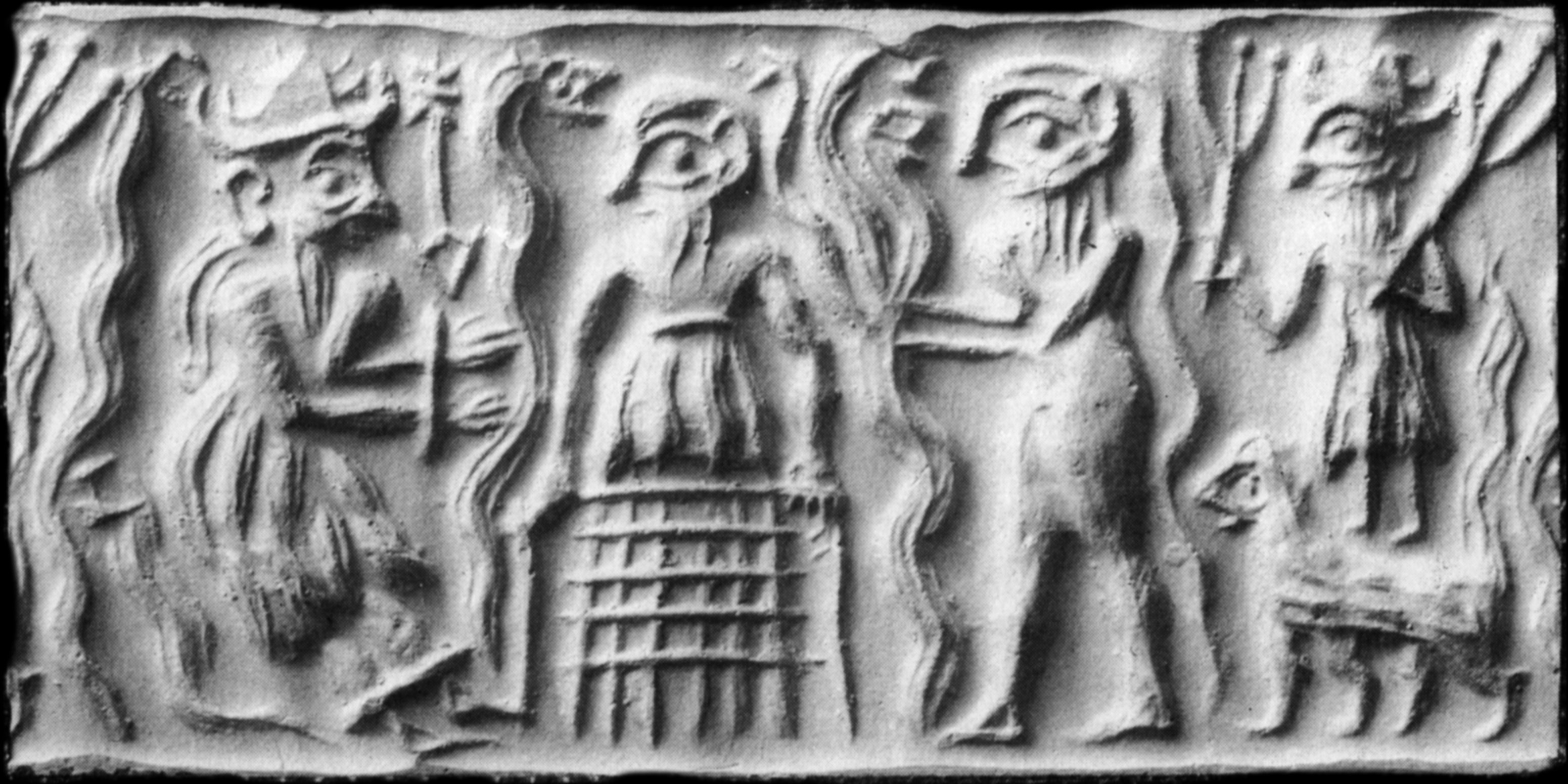
Ancient Sumerian cylinder seal impression showing the god Dumuzid being tortured in the underworld by galla demons

The ancient Mesopotamians believed that the underworld (Kur) was home to many demons, which are sometimes referred to as "offspring of arali". These demons could sometimes leave the underworld and terrorize mortals on earth. One class of demons that were believed to reside in the underworld was known as galla; their primary purpose appears to have been to drag unfortunate mortals back to Kur. They are frequently referenced in magical texts, and some texts describe them as being seven in number. Several extant poems describe the galla dragging the god Dumuzid into the underworld. Like other demons, however, galla could also be benevolent and, in a hymn from King Gudea of Lagash (c. 2144 – 2124 BC), a minor god named Ig-alima is described as "the great galla of Girsu". Demons had no cult in Mesopotamian religious practice since demons "know no food, know no drink, eat no flour offering and drink no libation."

=== Abrahamic religions ===
==== Judaism ====
Judaism does not have a demonology or any set of doctrines about demons. Use of the name "Lucifer" stems from Isaiah 14:3–20, a passage which does speak of the defeat of a particular Babylonian King, to whom it gives a title which refers to what in English is called the Day Star or Morning Star (in Latin, lucifer, meaning "light-bearer", from the words lucem ferre).

There is more than one instance in Jewish medieval myth and lore where demons are said to have come to be, as seen by the Grigori angels, of Lilith leaving Adam, of demons such as vampires, unrest spirits in Jewish folklore such as the dybbuk.

==== Christianity ====
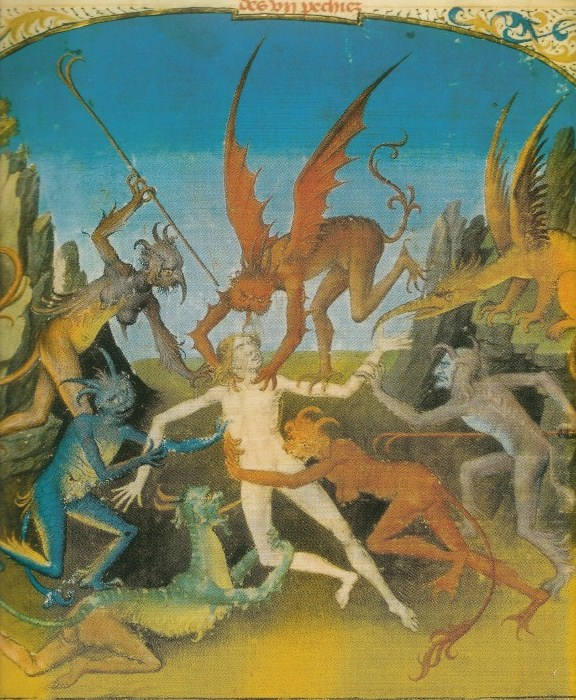
Man being attacked by the 7 deadly devils

Christian demonology is the study of demons from a Christian point of view. It is primarily based on the Bible (Old Testament and New Testament), the exegesis of scriptures, the writings of early Christian philosophers and hermits, tradition, and legends incorporated from other beliefs.

Some scholars suggest that the origins of early Greek Old Testament demonology can be traced to two distinctive and often competing mythologies of evil— Adamic and Enochic. The first tradition — the Adamic tradition — ties demons to the fall of man caused by the serpent who beguiled Adam and Eve in the Garden of Eden. Thus, the Adamic story traces the source of evil to Satan's transgression and the fall of man, a trend reflected in the Books of Adam and Eve which explains the reason for Satan's demotion by his refusal to worship and submit to God.

The other tradition — the early Enochic tradition — ties demons to the fall of angels in the antediluvian period. This tradition bases its understanding of the origin of demons on the story of the fallen Watchers led by Azazel. Scholars believe these two enigmatic figures—Azazel and Satan—exercised formative influence on early Jewish demonology. While in the beginning of their conceptual journeys, Azazel and Satan are posited as representatives of two distinctive and often rival trends tied to the distinctive etiologies of corruption, in later Jewish and Christian demonological lore, both antagonists can enter each other's respective stories in new conceptual capacities. In these later traditions Satanael is often depicted as the leader of the fallen angels while his conceptual rival Azazel is portrayed as a seducer of Adam and Eve. While historical Judaism never recognized any set of doctrines about demons, scholars believe its post-exilic concepts of eschatology, angelology, and demonology were influenced by Zoroastrianism. Some, however, believe these concepts were received as part of the Kabbalistic tradition. While many people believe today Lucifer and Satan are different names for the same being, not all scholars subscribe to this view.

Several authors throughout Christian history have written about demons for a variety of purposes. Theologians like Thomas Aquinas wrote concerning the behaviors of which Christians should be aware, while witch hunters like Heinrich Kramer wrote about how to find and what to do with people they believed were involved with demons. Some texts such as the Lesser Key of Solomon or The Grimoire of Pope Honorius (although these, the earliest manuscripts, were from well after these individuals had died) are written with instructions on how to summon demons in the name of God and often were claimed to have been written by individuals respected within the Church. These latter texts were usually more detailed, giving names, ranks, and descriptions of demons individually and categorically. Most Christians commonly reject these texts as either diabolical or fictitious. Catholics accused Lutherans of believing in diabolatry or that the devil had unlimited powers.

In modern times, some demonological texts have been written by Christians, usually in a similar vein to Thomas Aquinas, explaining their effects in the world and how faith may lessen or eliminate damage by them. A few Christian authors, such as Jack Chick and John Todd, write with intentions similar to Kramer, proclaiming that demons and their human agents are active in the world. These claims can stray from mainstream ideology, and may include such beliefs as that Christian rock is a means through which demons influence people. Not all Christians believe that demons exist in the literal sense. Some believe that the New Testament's exorcism language was originally part of curing ceremonies for what are now recognized as epilepsy, mental illness, etc.

==== Islam ====
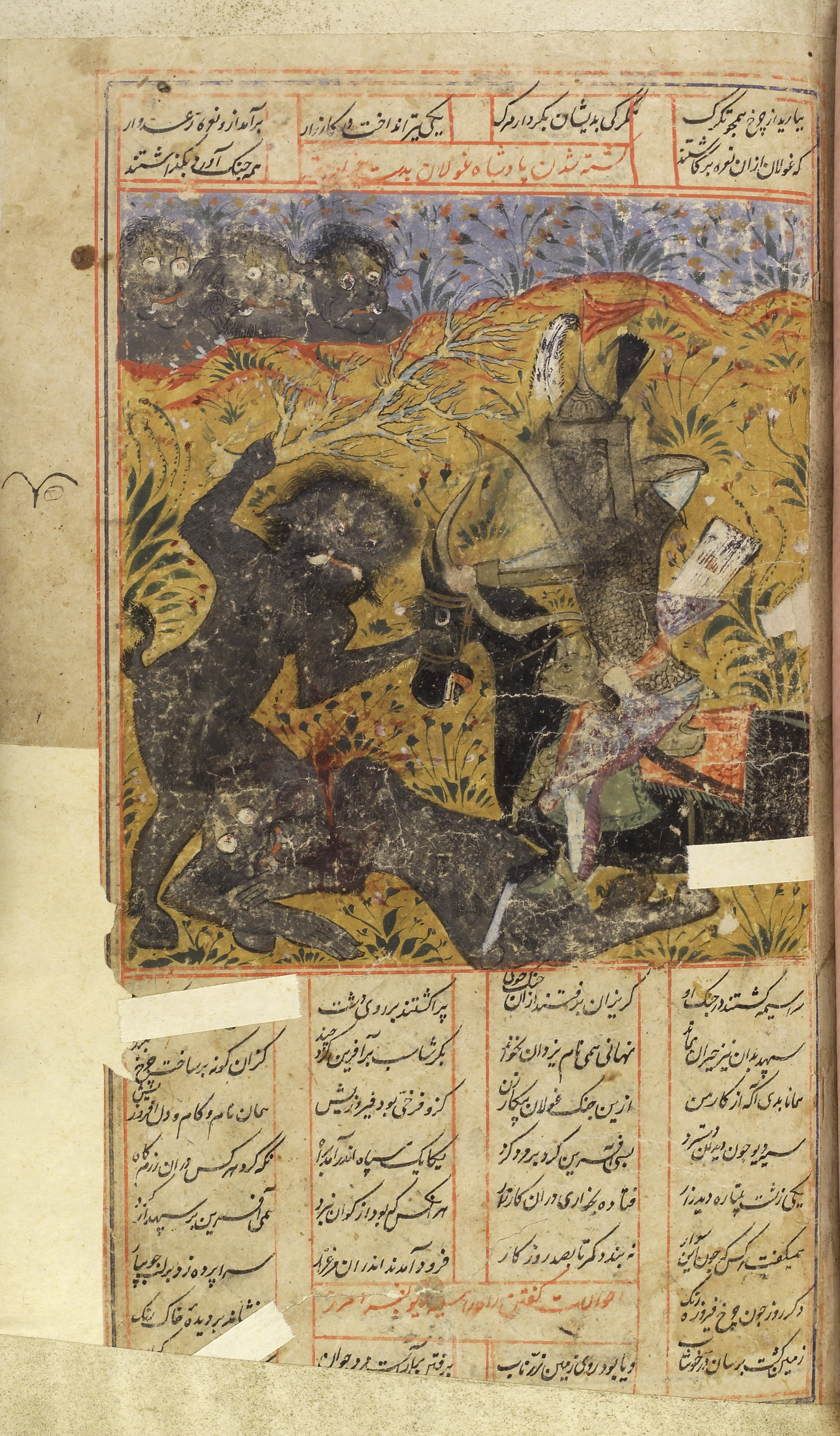
Jinns gather to do battle with the hero Faramarz. Illustration in an illuminated manuscript of the Iranian epic Shahnameh

Many demonic or demon-like entities are not purely spiritual but physical in nature and related to animals. Julius Wellhausen states, that Islamic demonology is always zoology as well. One prominent classification is given by al-Jahiz, who classifies jinn as:

- Amir, jinn who live among humans.
- Angels, benevolent and good jinn.
- Devils, malicious and evil jinn.
- Marid, strong jinn who steal information from Heaven.
- Ifrit, the most powerful jinn.

Zakariya al-Qazwini's Aja'ib al-Makhluqat mentions seven types of animals. The jinn are classified as animals composed of fire and can appear in many forms. Among them, the angels are created from the light of fire, the jinn from a blaze of fire, and the devils from the smoke of fire. Satan is counted among these animals. They inhabited the earth before mankind. The German orientalist Almut Wieland-Karimi classified the Jinn in the ten most common categories mentioned in folklore literature:

- Jinn or Jann: ordinary jinn, a class apart from other jinn types, but also used as a collective to refer to invisible beings in general
- Shaitan: Malevolent jinni, who causes illness and madness
- Ifrit: delimitation to ordinary jinn remains unclear. Can be either a powerful, cunning Jinn or a strong Shaitan. Ifrits are generally bad.
- Marid: a haughty and powerful Shaitan or very malevolent Ifrit.
- Bu'bu: a jinn that frightens children.
- Si'lah: a female demon who seduces men.
- Amir: spirits dwelling in houses.
- Ghul: generally evil, lives in the desert.
- Qarînah: name for a specific demon or doppelgänger, a type of spirit that follows every human.
- Hatif: a mysterious phenomenon, which can only be heard but never seen.

=== Buddhism ===
Traditionally, Buddhism affirms the existence of hells populated by demons who torment sinners and tempt mortals to sin, or who seek to thwart their enlightenment, with a demon named Mara as chief tempter, "prince of darkness", or "Evil One" in Sanskrit sources. The followers of Mara were also called mara, the devils, and are frequently cited as a cause of disease or representations of mental obstructions. The mara became fully assimilated into the Chinese worldview, and was called mo. The idea of the imminent decline and collapse of the Buddhist religion amid a "great cacophony of demonic influences" was already a significant component of Buddhism when it reached China in the first century A.D., according to Michel Strickmann. Demonic forces had attained enormous power in the world. For some writers of the time, this state of affairs had been ordained to serve the higher purpose of effecting a "preliminary cleansing" that would purge and purify humanity in preparation for an ultimate, messianic renewal.

Medieval Chinese Buddhist demonology was heavily influenced by Indian Buddhism. Indian demonology is also fully and systematically described in written sources, though during Buddhism's centuries of direct influence in China, "Chinese demonology was whipped into respectable shape," with several Indian demons finding permanent niches even in Taoist ritual texts. In the Kṣitigarbha Sūtra it states that heaven and hell change as the world changes and that many new hells with different demons can be created to fit the different ways that the human realm changes. Chinese Buddhism also influenced Taoism with beliefs of hell, and the Taoists eventually came up with their own demonology lore, which in turn created folk beliefs about spirits in hell, which was a combination of beliefs from the two religions. However, the demons in hell are viewed differently than Abrahamic faiths, who, instead of being pure evil, are more of guards of hell, although they are still viewed as malicious beings. They are ruled over by Yama, who came from Buddhism's Hindu influences, but certain scriptures and beliefs also state that there are 18 different Yamas in hell, which have an army of demons and undead at their side.

Also, the Śūraṅgama Sūtra, a major Mahayana Buddhist text, describes fifty demonic states: the so-called fifty skandha maras, which are "negative" mirror-like reflections of or deviations from correct samādhi (meditative absorption) states. In this context demons are considered by Buddhists to be beings possessing some supernatural powers, who, in the past, might have practiced Dharma, the Buddha's teaching, but due to practicing it incorrectly failed to develop true wisdom and true compassion, which are inseparable attributes of an enlightened being such as a Buddha or a Bodhisattva. In his autobiography, The Blazing Splendor, Tulku Urgyen Rinpoche, a prominent Tibetan Buddhist master of the 20th century, describes encounters with such beings. Therefore, depending on the context, in Buddhism, demons may refer to both disturbed mind states and actual beings.

=== Hinduism ===
Vedic scriptures include a range of spirits (Vetalas, Rakshasas, Bhutas, and Pishachas) that might be classified as demons. These spirits are the souls of beings that have committed certain specific sins. As a purging punishment, they are condemned to roam without a physical form for a length of time, until a rebirth. Beings that died with unfulfilled desires or anger are also said to "linger" until those issues are resolved. Hindu text Atharvaveda gives an account of nature and habitats of such spirits, including how to persuade/control them. There are occult traditions in Hinduism that seek to control such spirits to do their bidding. The Hindu text Garuda Purana details other kinds of punishments and judgments given out in Hell; it also gives an account of how spirits travel to various nether worlds.

=== Zoroastrianism ===
In the Zoroastrian tradition, Ahura Mazda, as the force of good Spenta Mainyu, will eventually be victorious in a cosmic battle with an evil force known as Angra Mainyu or Ahriman.

== See also ==
- Classification of demons
- Deal with the Devil
- Demon hunter
- Demonic possession
- Discernment of spirits
- Evocation
- Exorcism
- Hierarchy of angels
- List of theological demons
- Obsession
- Pentagram
- Nicolas Remy
- Séance
- Spirit possession
- Spirit world
- True name

== Bibliography ==
- Bamberger, Bernard, Jacob (2006). Fallen Angels: Soldiers of Satan's Realm. Jewish Publication Society of America. ISBN 0-8276-0797-0.
- Black, Jeremy; Green, Anthony (1992), Gods, Demons and Symbols of Ancient Mesopotamia: An Illustrated Dictionary, Austin: University of Texas Press, ISBN 0714117056
- Edward Waite, Arthur (1913). "Book of Ceremonial Magic". Sacred-texts.com. p. 64 & 106.
- Langton, Edward (2014). Essentials of Demonology (1st 1949 ed.). Wipf & Stock. ISBN 978-1498205061.
- Rémy, Nicholas (1974). Demonolatry. University Books.
