= Salammbô (Mussorgsky) =

Unfinished opera, written 1863–1866

- Opera fragment by Modest Mussorgsky
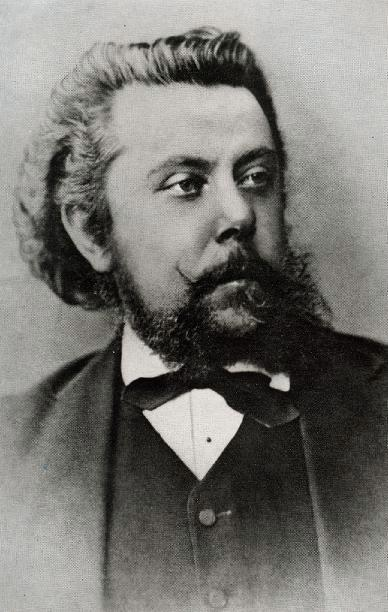
- Mussorgsky
- Native title: Russian: Саламбо
- Librettist: Mussorgsky
- Language: Russian
- Based on: Salammbô by Flaubert
- Premiere: 29 March 1983; Teatro di San Carlo, Naples

Salammbô (Russian: Саламбо, Salambo) [alternative title: The Libyan (Russian: Ливиец, Liviyets)] is an unfinished opera in four acts by Modest Mussorgsky. The fragmentary Russian language libretto was written by the composer, and is based on the novel Salammbô (1862) by Gustave Flaubert, but includes verses taken from poems by Vasiliy Zhukovsky, Apollon Maykov, Aleksandr Polezhayev, and other Russian poets.

Salammbô was Mussorgsky's first major attempt at an opera. He worked on the project from 1863 to 1866, completing six numbers before losing interest. In 1865 Mussorgsky's mother died and he felt the loss deeply. There are sources indicating Mussorgsky composed more but did not write down some further scenes, in particular a love scene featuring Mathô and Salammbô. A 1872 drawn-up catalogue mentions a Salammbô scene, unlike the presently known material, completed in 1865.

== Composition history ==
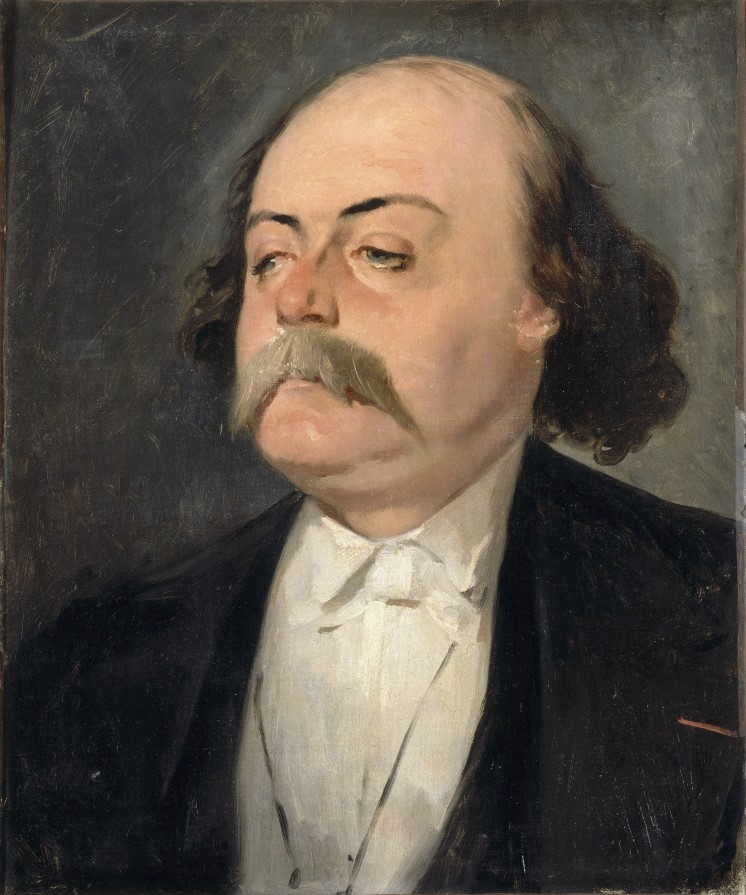
Gustave Flaubert

The Russian translation of Flaubert's 1862 novel was published serially in the Saint Petersburg journal Otechestvennye Zapiski in 1863, and was read with enthusiasm by the six members of the commune in which the composer was then living. Mussorgsky was likely influenced in his choice of subject by having recently heard Aleksandr Serov's Judith, which premiered on 16 May 1863, and which shares with Salammbô an exotic setting and similar narrative details.

The unfinished vocal score consists of three scenes and three separate numbers:

No.	Completed	Scene	Description
1	1864-08	Act 1	Song: "Song of the Balearic Islander"
2	1866-04-10	Act 1	Chorus: "War Song of the Libyans"
3	1863-12-15	Act 2, Scene 2	Scene: The Temple of Tanit in Carthage
4	1864-11-10	Act 3, Scene 1	Scene: The Temple of Molokh
5	1864-11-26	Act 4, Scene 1	Scene: The Dungeon of the Acropolis
6	1866-02-08	Act 4, Scene 2	Chorus: [Chorus of Priestesses]

Two numbers (No.2 and No.5) were orchestrated by the composer. Zoltán Peskó claims to have found a Mussorgsky orchestration of No. 1 in the library of the Paris Conservatory, but this version has disappeared.

The chorus of priestesses and warriors (Act 2, Scene 2, Episode 3: "After the theft of the Zaimph") is a reworking of the "Scene in the Temple: Chorus of the People", the only surviving number from Oedipus in Athens (1858-1861), Mussorgsky's earliest stage-work.

In Mathô's monologue in the dungeon (the passage "I shall die alone"), the text is borrowed from the poem Song of the Captive Iroquois, by Alexander Polezhayev. The theme of this passage, accompanying a new text, was recycled in 1877 in the chorus Joshua [see Subsequent use of musical materials in this article for more details].

Mussorgsky's orchestration in Salammbô is quite ahead of its time. One example of a modern idea is, in the projected scoring for the "Hymn to Tanit" (Act 2, Scene 2), the abundance and variety of percussion, in addition to a mixture of pianos, harps, and glockenspiels of a sort which only reappeared fifty years later.

== Performance history ==
The first staged performance of Salammbô took place at the Teatro di San Carlo, Naples, on 29 March 1983 in a version revised and edited by Zoltán Peskó. The work was repeated on 30 March and on 1, 2 and 6 April. It had originally been agreed that the role of Salammbô in these performances would be sung by Lyudmila Shemchuk and that of Mathô by Georgy Seleznev, but the Soviet authorities subsequently withdrew the exit visas of both singers, and they were substituted by Annabelle Bernard and Boris Bakov respectively. Because of these enforced changes it was necessary to postpone the date of the premiere from 26 to 29 March.

In 1989 Vyacheslav Nagovitsin was commissioned to produce an orchestration in the fullest possible version, in addition to the available numbers orchestrated by Mussorgsky, Rimsky-Korsakov and Vissarion Shebalin. This staged version of the opera was first performed at the Ancient Roman arena in Mérida, Spain.

== Roles ==
Role	Voice type	Premiere, 29 March 1983, Teatro di San Carlo, Naples (Conductor: Zoltán Peskó)	Premiere, 26 July 1991, Teatro Romano, Merida (Conductor: Valery Gergiev)
The Balearic Islander	baritone	William Stone	Vasily Gerelo
Salambo (Salammbô), Hamilcar's daughter, chief priestess of Tanit	mezzo-soprano	Annabelle Bernard	Olga Borodina
Mato (Mathô), leader of the Libyan mercenaries	bass	Boris Bakov	Bulat Minzhilkiev
Spendiy (Spendius), a freed slave, a mercenary leader	baritone	William Stone	Valery Lebed
Aminakhar (Aminachar), high priest of Molokh	baritone	Ferenc Berganij	Vladimir Ognovenko
1st Pentarch	tenor	Dimiter Petkov	Nikolai Gassiev
2nd Pentarch	bass	Nicola Troisi	Sergei Alexashkin
3rd Pentarch	bass		Evgeny Fedotov
4th Pentarch	tenor		
Libyan mercenaries, warriors, priestesses of Tanit, priests of Moloch, women, children, old men, people of Carthage

== Synopsis ==
Setting

Time: 241 to 238 B.C., before and during the Mercenary Revolt.
Place: Carthage (in what is now Tunisia).

Although no complete synopsis is available, Tedeschi states, it be reconstructed fairly accurately without any effort, since Mussorgsky stays close to the handling of the original.

=== Act 1 ===
Scene: Hamilcar's Garden in Carthage

After the war with Rome was lost, the mercenaries Carthage recruited from Europe and Africa are rebelling, because they have not been paid. To calm them down, they are invited to a festive feast in the gardens of Hamilcar's palace. Soon it degenerates into a brutal argument. Slaves are freed from the underground dungeons, lions and elephants are mutilated, the sacred fish are eaten. When Salammbô, the daughter of Hamilcar and priestess of Tanit, appears (singing) in the middle of the violent goings-on, it soothes their spirits. Mâtho, the chief of the Libyan warriors and the Numidian leader Narr'Havas are captivated by her appearance.

=== Act 2 ===
Scene 1: The rampart of Megara
Spendius, a freed slave, urges Mâtho to sneak into Carthage in order to steal the miraculous veil guarded by Salammbô, the Zaimph, which protects the city.

Scene 2: The Temple of Tanit in Carthage
In the temple of Tanit. Salammbô sings - first alone, then with the choir - a hymn to the goddess and decorates the altar with emerging and stealing the veil. The Virgin awakes, sounds the alarm, the stage fills with people and priests.

=== Act 3 ===
Scene 1: The Temple of Moloch
The priests sacrifice little children to the terrible god and, together with the people, implore his help. Enter Salammbô; she joins the prayers and announces her resolve to go to the barbarian camp to reclaim the veil.

Scene 2: The tent at the encampment
Salammbô seduces Mâtho and falls asleep in his arms. Then, while the Carthaginians storm the camp and take Mâtho prisoner, she takes possession of the veil.

=== Act 4 ===
Scene 1: The Dungeon of the Acropolis
Mâthos lament. He is being held captive in the dungeons of the Carthaginian Acropolis. Priests and pentarchs sentence him to death.

Scene 2: The festival of celebration in Carthage
The priestesses clothes Salammbô for the double ceremony, the marriage to Narr'Havas and the execution of Mâtho. During the wedding banquet, Mâtho, martyred to death, falls at the feet of Salammbô, who in turn falls dead over his body.

== Subsequent use of musical materials ==
Mussorgsky reused much of the music from Salammbô in later works. Nikolay Rimsky-Korsakov gives the following account of thematic borrowing in his memoirs, Chronicle of My Musical Life (1909):

During the season of 1866-1867 I became more intimate with Mussorgsky. I used to visit him; he lived with his married brother Filaret, near the Kashin Bridge. He played me many excerpts from his opera Salambo, which greatly delighted me. Then also, I think, he played me his fantasy St. John's Eve, for piano and orchestra, conceived under the influence of the Danse Macabre. Subsequently the music of this fantasy, having undergone many metamorphoses, was utilized as material for A Night on Bald Mountain. He also played me his delightful Jewish choruses: The Rout of Sennacherib and Iisus Navin [Joshua]. The music of the latter was taken by him from Salambo. The theme of this chorus had been overheard by Mussorgsky from Jews who lived in the same house as Mussorgsky and who were celebrating the Feast of the Tabernacles. Mussorgsky also played me the songs which had failed with Balakirev and Cui. Among these were Kalistrat and the beautiful fantasy Night, on a text by Pushkin. The song Kalistrat was a forerunner of the realistic vein which Mussorgsky later made his own; the song Night was representative of that ideal side of his talent which he himself trampled into the mire, though still drawing on its reserve stock in emergency. This reserve stock had been accumulated by him in Salambo and the Jewish choruses, when he took but little thought of the coarse muzhik. Be it remarked that the greater part of his ideal style [in, for example, Boris Godunov], such as Tsar Boris's arioso, the phrases of Dmitriy at the fountain, the chorus in the boyar duma, the death of Boris, etc., were taken by him from Salambo. His ideal style lacked a suitable crystal-like finish and graceful form. This he lacked because he had no knowledge of harmony and counterpoint. At first Balakirev's circle ridiculed these needless sciences, and then declared them beyond Mussorgsky. And so he went through life without them and consoled himself by regarding his ignorance as a virtue and the technique of others as routine and conservatism. But whenever he did manage to obtain a beautiful and flowing succession of notes, how happy he was. I witnessed that more than once."

Russian original

«В течение сезона 1866/67 года я более сблизился с Мусоргским. Я бывал у него, а жил он со своим женатым братом Филаретом близ Кашина моста. Он много мне играл отрывков из своей «Саламбо», которые меня премного восхищали. Кажется, тогда же играл он мне свою фантазию «Иванова ночь» для фортепиано с оркестром, затеянную под влиянием «Danse macabre». Впоследствии музыка этой фантазии, претерпев многие метаморфозы, послужила материалом для «Ночи на Лысой горе». Играл он также мне свои прелестные еврейские хоры: «Поражение Сенахериба» и «Иисус Навин». Музыка последнего была взята им из оперы «Саламбо». Тема этого хора была подслушана Мусоргским у евреев, живших с ним в одном дворе и справлявших праздник кущей. Играл мне Мусоргский и романсы свои, которые не имели успеха у Балакирева и Кюи. Между ними были: «Калистрат» и красивая фантазия «Ночь» на слова Пушкина. Романс «Калистрат» был предтечею того реального направления, которое позднее принял Мусоргский; романс же «Ночь» был представителем той идеальной стороны его таланта, которую впоследствии он сам втоптал в грязь, но запасом которой при случае пользовался. Запас этот был заготовлен им в «Саламбо» и еврейских хорах, когда он еще мало думал о сером мужике. Замечу, что большая часть его идеального стиля, например ариозо царя Бориса, фразы самозванца у фонтана, хор в боярской думе, смерть Бориса и т. д. — взяты им из «Саламбо». Его идеальному стилю недоставало подходящей кристаллически-прозрачной отделки и изящной формы; недоставало потому, что не было у него знания гармонии и контрапункта. Балакиревская среда осмеивала сначала эти ненужные науки, потом объявила их недоступными для Мусоргского. Так он без них и прожил, возводя для собственного утешения свое незнание в доблесть, а технику других в рутину и консерватизм. Но когда красивая и плавная последовательность удавалась ему, наперекор предвзятым взглядам, как он был счастлив. Я был свидетелем этого не один раз.»

The Song of the Balearic Islander (Russian: «Песнь балеарца», Pesn' baleartsa) was included by the composer in a collection of his juvenilia composed between 1857 and 1866 called Youthful Years (Russian: «Юные годы», Yunïye godï, 1866). The song is No. 17 in the series of manuscripts consisting of 17 songs and one duet.

Several measures of Salammbô's dialogue with the crowd were used in the 1867 tone poem St. John's Eve on the Bare Mountain (but appear rather to have been used in the later adaptation of this work, Dream Vision of the Peasant Lad, 1880):

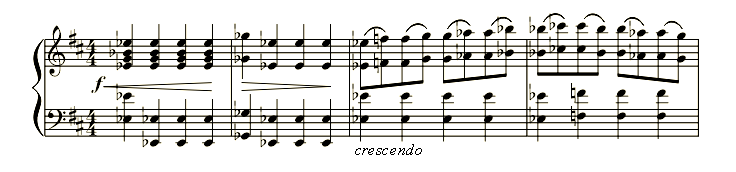

Several musical themes from this project were recycled and played important roles in the composer's subsequent opera Boris Godunov (1869–1872). The borrowings concern the orchestral accompaniments only, which are fitted to new vocal lines. The correspondence in narrative detail, mood, or atmosphere in each case is often quite close:

Seq.	Scene	Salammbô	Seq.	Scene	Boris Godunov (Revised Version)
1	Act 2, Scene 2	Salammbô: "Gentle Tanit" ('Ritual scena')	8	Act 4, Scene 1	Boris: "From empyrean unassailable heights" (Prayer)
2	Act 2, Scene 2	Chorus: "Go down to the dark meadow and forest" (in the 'Hymn to Tanit')	3	Act 3, Scene 2	Dmitriy: "Tis you alone, Marina"
3	Act 2, Scene 2	Mathô: "Divine, wondrous singing"	4	Act 3, Scene 2	Dmitriy: "You wound my heart, cruel Marina"
4	Act 2, Scene 2	Salammbô: "Away! Away from me!" (Salammbô's curse)	9	Act 4, Scene 2	Vagabonds: "Gaida! Choke them! Throttle them!" (The lynching of the Jesuits)
5	Act 3, Scene 1	High Priest: "Our sacred city is besieged"	2	Act 2	Boris: "Heavy is the right hand of the awesome judge" (Boris's arioso)
6	Act 3, Scene 1	People: "Repel the daring foes from our walls"	1	Act 2	Boris: "In vain the astrologers foretell" (Boris's arioso)
7	Act 3, Scene 1	Priests and people: "Glory to Moloch!" (Processional music)	10	Act 4, Scene 2	Vagabonds: "Glory to the Tsarevich!" (Processional music)
8	Act 4, Scene 1	Mathô: "You were under my heel" (describing Narr'Havas's treachery)	7	Act 4, Scene 1	Shuysky: "Pale, bathed in a cold sweat" (describing Boris's hallucination)
9	Act 4, Scene 1	Four priests of Moloch: "Glory to thee, all-powerful one!"	5	Act 4, Scene 1	Orchestral introduction
10	Act 4, Scene 1	The pentarchs sentence Mathô to execution	6	Act 4, Scene 1	The boyars pass sentence on the Pretender

The War Song of the Libyans (Russian: Боевая песнь Ливийцев, Boyevaya pesn' Liviytsev) from Act 1 became the basis of the chorus Iisus Navin (Russian: «Иисус Навин»), better known as Joshua, for alto, baritone, chorus, and piano, composed in 1877. An orchestral edition prepared by Nikolai Rimsky-Korsakov was published in 1883. The theme of the middle section of Joshua, a solo for alto and a brief women's chorus, "The women of Canaan weep", said to be of Jewish origin by Vladimir Stasov and Rimsky-Korsakov, is based on part of Mathô's monologue in the dungeon, "I shall die alone" (Act 4, Scene 1).

The 'Chorus of Priestesses' (Act 4, Scene 2) was orchestrated by Rimsky-Korsakov (1884), and published and performed as an independent piece after Mussorgsky's death (1881).

== Versions by other hands ==
Zoltán Peskó was the first to orchestrate the rest of the numbers.

Year	Editor	Type	Notes
1980	Zoltán Peskó	Orchestration	Performance: 10 November 1980, Milan
1991	Vyacheslav Nagovitsin	Orchestration	Performance: 26/27 July 1991, Mérida

== Recordings ==
Year	Cast: (Salammbô, Mathô, Spendius, High Priest)	Conductor and Orchestra	Version	Label
1980	Ludmilla Shemchuk, Georgiy Seleznev, William Stone, Giorgio Surjan	Zoltán Peskó; Orchestra Sinfonica e Coro di Milano della Radiotelevisione Italiana, (Recording of a concert performance on 10 November of the six remaining scenes (3 of which were orchestrated by the conductor))	Peskó	LP: CBS Masterworks, Cat. #:79253 (UK); MZ 36939 (USA)
1991	Olga Borodina, Bulat Minzhilkiev, Valeriy Lebed, Vladimir Ognovienko	Valery Gergiev; Kirov Orchestra and Chorus	Nagovitsin	
2003	Irina Makarova, Mikhail Dyakov, Andreas Schulist, Stanislav Suleimanov	Mstislav Rostropovich; Chor und Symphonieorchester des Bayerischen Rundfunks; Augsburger Domsingknaben	Nagovitsin	
