= Salammbô (disambiguation) =

Salammbô may refer to:

- Salammbo (Carthage), the name of the ancient children's cemetery (tophet) of Carthage
- Salammbô (1862), the original novel by Gustave Flaubert (and name given by Flaubert to the character of the youngest daughter of Hamilcar Barca)
- Salammbô (Mussorgsky), an unfinished opera, based on Flaubert's novel, on which Modest Mussorgsky worked between 1863 and 1866
- Salammbô (Reyer) (1890), an opera composed by Ernest Reyer based on Flaubert's novel
- Salammbô (Rachmaninoff) a projected opera by Sergei Rachmaninoff
- Salammbo, a 1925 film by Alexander Kolowrat
- Salammbo, a 1940 opera by Veselin Stoyanov
- The Loves of Salammbo, a film directed by Sergio Grieco
- Salammbo: Battle for Carthage, a video game
