= Lyudmila Shemchuk =

Ukrainian operatic mezzo-soprano (born 1946)

Lyudmila Stepanivna Shemchuk (Ukrainian: Людмила Степанівна Шемчук, Russian: Людми́ла Степа́новна Шемчу́к; born 11 September 1946 at Styla, Soviet Union) is a Ukrainian operatic mezzo-soprano. She is an Honoured Artist of the RSFSR (1984).

== Biography ==
Lyudmila Shemchuk was born at Styla in the Starobeshivskyi Raion of Donetsk Oblast. At the age of five she moved with her mother and grandmother to Dokuchaevsk, where she obtained a music school diploma in piano playing and sang in the school choir.

She graduated in 1968 from Donetsk Academy of Music (class of L. Goncharova) and then moved to the Odesa Conservatory (now known as the Odesa National A. V. Nezhdanova Academy of Music) to study with Olga Nicolaevna Blagovidova (Honoured Artist of the USSR, 1946), whose former pupils include Bela Rudenko and Alexander Dedik. It was at the Opera Studio of Odesa Conservatory that Shemchuk appeared in her first stage performance when she sang the role of Fyodor in Mussorgsky’s Boris Godunov. After her graduation in 1973 she joined the Kyiv Opera Company as an apprentice before moving to Minsk Opera, where she sang from 1974 to 1977. From 1977 to 1989, she was a soloist at the Bolshoi Theatre in Moscow.

In 1975 she won two awards at the seventh Mikhail Glinka All Union Competition for vocalists at Tbilisi. In 1977 she also won two prizes at the Heitor Villa-Lobos International Competition for Vocalists in Rio de Janeiro. In 1978 she was awarded a Gold Medal at the sixth International Tchaikovsky Competition.

After participating at the Mussorgsky Festival in Italy in 1981, she was invited to sing the role of Marfa in Mussorgsky’s opera Khovanshchina at La Scala. She was to have sung the title role in the first ever staged performance of Mussorgsky’s incomplete opera Salammbô (in the version revised and edited by Zoltán Peskó) in March 1983 at the Teatro San Carlo, Naples, but unforeseen problems in obtaining an exit visa meant that she had to be replaced at a very late stage by the African American soprano Annabelle Bernard of the Deutsche Oper Berlin. Other theatres at which Shemchuk has appeared include the Verona Arena and the Metropolitan Opera, New York City.

In 1984 the Presidium of the Supreme Soviet of the Russian Soviet Federative Socialist Republic awarded her the title of Honoured Artist of Russia.

After retiring from the Bolshoi Theatre, Lyudmila Shemchuk became a soloist at the Vienna State Opera, where she remained for two years. In 2003 she joined the Donetsk National Academic Opera and Ballet Theatre «A. Solovyanenko», although she continued to maintain a busy touring schedule. In 2005, in recognition of her outstanding achievements in the field of opera during the last decade of the Twentieth Century, she was awarded a Gold Medal from the Irina Arkhipova Fund.

== Repertoire ==
- Georges Bizet
  - Carmen (Carmen)
- Konstantyn Dankevych
  - Bogdan Khmelnytsky (Barbara)
- Pietro Mascagni
  - Cavalleria Rusticana (Santuzza)
- Modest Mussorgsky
  - Boris Godunov (Marina Mniszech)
  - Khovanshchina (Marfa)
- Nikolai Rimsky-Korsakov
  - The Tsar’s Bride (Lyubasha)
- Pyotr Ilyich Tchaikovsky
  - Mazeppa (Lyubov)
- Giuseppe Verdi
  - Aida (Amneris)
  - Il trovatore (Azucena)
  - Un ballo in maschera (Ulrica)

and many others.

== Recordings ==
- Modest Mussorgsky
  - Salammbô (Salammbô). Audio 2xCD, Warner Fonit, ASIN: B000095K95
- Pyotr Ilyich Tchaikovsky
  - Cherevichki (Solokha). Audio 3xCD, Dynamic CDS 287/1-3
  - The Queen of Spades (Pauline). Audio 2xCD, Orfeo, ASIN: C811112i
