= Moloch =

Canaanite deity or form of human sacrifice

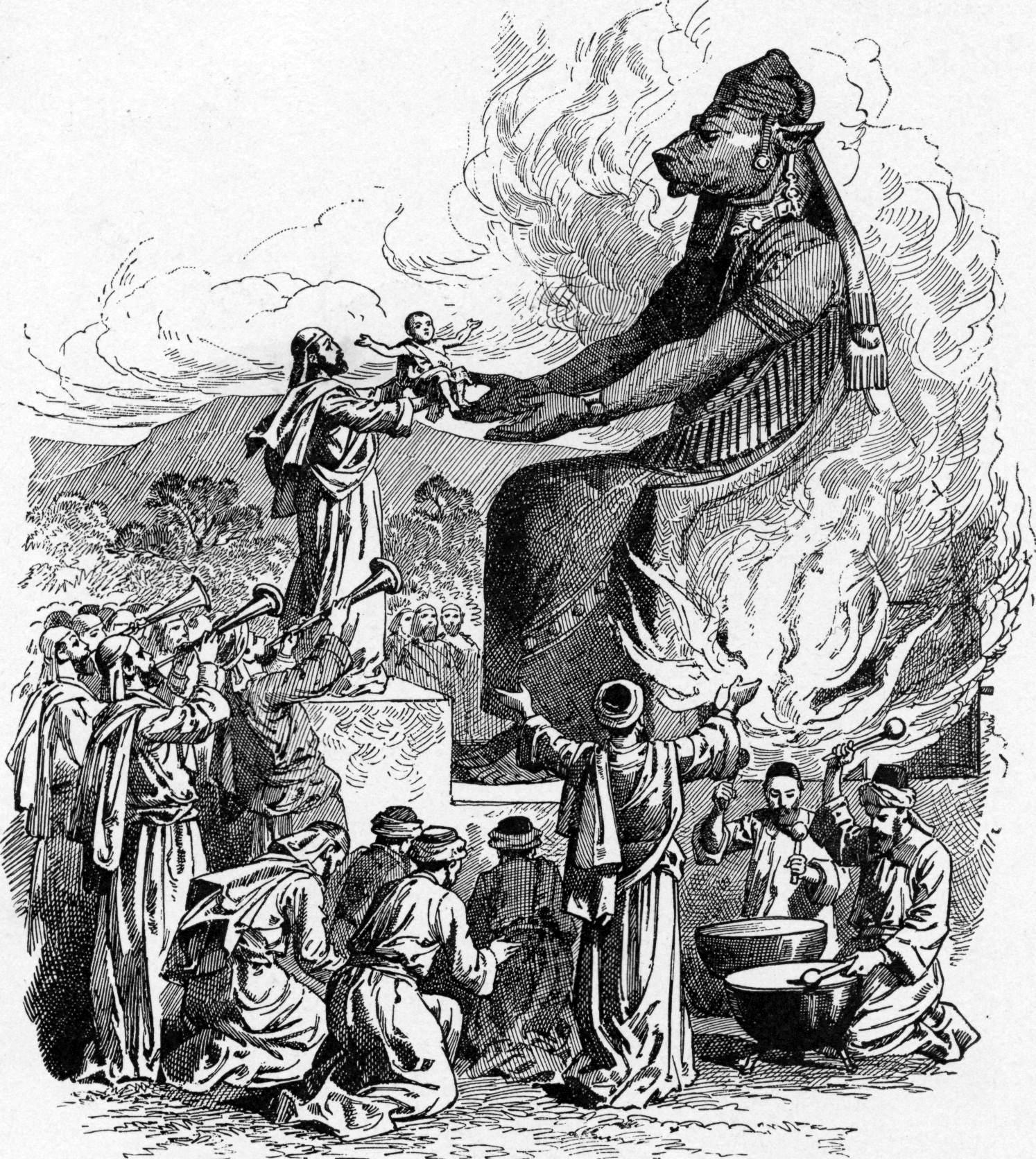
''Offering to Molech'' in Bible Pictures and What They Teach Us, by Charles Foster, 1897. The drawing is typical of Moloch depictions in nineteenth-century illustrations.

Moloch, (Note: /ˈmɒlək, ˈmoʊlɒk/. See "Moloch". Merriam-Webster.com Dictionary. Merriam-Webster. OCLC 1032680871.) Molech, or Molek (Note: Biblical Hebrew: מֹלֶךְ Mōleḵ, properly הַמֹּלֶךְ, hamMōleḵ "the Moloch"; Ancient Greek: Μόλοχ; Latin: Moloch) is a word which appears in the Hebrew Bible several times, primarily in the Book of Leviticus. The Greek Septuagint translates many of these instances as "their king", but maintains the word or name Moloch in others, including one additional time in the Book of Amos where the Hebrew text does not attest the name. The Bible strongly condemns practices that are associated with Moloch, which are heavily implied to include child sacrifice.

Traditionally, the name Moloch has been understood as referring to a Canaanite god. However, since 1935, scholars have speculated that Moloch refers to the sacrifice itself, since the Hebrew word mlk is identical in spelling to a term that means "sacrifice" in the closely related Punic language. This second position has grown increasingly popular, but it remains contested. Among proponents of this second position, controversy continues as to whether the sacrifices were offered to Yahweh or another deity, and whether they were a native Israelite religious custom or a Phoenician import.

Since the medieval period, Moloch has often been portrayed as a bull-headed idol with outstretched hands over a fire; this depiction takes the brief mentions of Moloch in the Bible and combines them with various sources, including ancient accounts of Carthaginian child sacrifice and the legend of the Minotaur.

Beginning in the modern era, "Moloch" has been figuratively used in reference to a power which demands a dire sacrifice. A god Moloch appears in various works of literature and film, such as John Milton's Paradise Lost (1667), Gustave Flaubert's Salammbô (1862), Giovanni Pastrone's Cabiria (1914), Fritz Lang's Metropolis (1927), and Allen Ginsberg's "Howl" (1955).

== Etymology ==
The etymology of Moloch is uncertain: a derivation from the root mlk, which means "to rule", is "widely recognized". Since it was first proposed by Abraham Geiger in 1857, some scholars have argued that the word "Moloch" has been altered by using the vowels of bōšet "shame". Other scholars have argued that the name is a qal participle from the same verb. R. M. Kerr criticizes both theories by noting that the name of no other god appears to have been formed from a qal participle, and that Geiger's proposal is "an out-of-date theory which has never received any factual support". Paul Mosca, Professor Emeritus at the University of British Columbia, similarly argued that "the theory that a form molek would immediately suggest to the reader or hearer the word boset (rather than qodes or ohel) is the product of nineteenth century ingenuity, not of Massoretic [sic] or pre-Massoretic tendentiousness".

Scholars who do not believe that Moloch represents a deity instead compare the name to inscriptions in the closely related Punic language where the word mlk (molk or mulk) refers to a type of sacrifice, a connection first proposed by Otto Eissfeldt (1935). Eissfeldt himself, following Jean-Baptiste Chabot, connected Punic mlk and Moloch to a Syriac verb mlk meaning "to promise", a theory also supported as "the least problematic solution" by Heath Dewrell (2017). Eissfeldt's proposed meaning included both the act and the object of sacrifice. Scholars such as W. von Soden argue that the term is a nominalized causative form of the verb ylk/wlk, meaning "to offer", "present", and thus means "the act of presenting" or "thing presented". Kerr instead derives both the Punic and Hebrew word from the verb mlk, which he proposes meant "to own", "to possess" in Proto-Semitic, only later coming to mean "to rule"; the meaning of Moloch would thus originally have been "present", "gift", and later come to mean "sacrifice".

The spelling "Moloch" follows the Greek Septuagint and the Latin Vulgate; the spelling "Molech" or "Molek" follows the Tiberian vocalization of Hebrew, with "Molech" used in the English King James Bible.

== Biblical attestations ==
=== Masoretic Text ===
The word Moloch (מלך) occurs eight times in the Masoretic Text, the standard Hebrew text of the Bible. Five of these are in Leviticus, with one in 1 Kings, one in 2 Kings and another in The Book of Jeremiah. Seven instances include the Hebrew definite article ha- ('the') or have a prepositional form indicating the presence of the definite article. All of these texts condemn Israelites who engage in practices associated with Moloch, and most associate Moloch with the use of children as offerings.

Leviticus repeatedly forbids the practice of offering children to Moloch:

And thou shalt not give any of thy seed to set them apart to Molech, neither shalt thou profane the name of thy God: I am the LORD.

— Leviticus 18:21, Jewish Publication Society of America Version 1917

The majority of the Leviticus references come from a single passage of four lines:

Moreover, thou shalt say to the children of Israel: Whosoever he be of the children of Israel, or of the strangers that sojourn in Israel, that giveth of his seed unto Molech; he shall surely be put to death; the people of the land shall stone him with stones. I also will set My face against that man, and will cut him off from among his people, because he hath given of his seed unto Molech, to defile My sanctuary, and to profane My holy name. And if the people of the land do at all hide their eyes from that man, when he giveth of his seed unto Molech, and put him not to death; then I will set My face against that man, and against his family, and will cut him off, and all that go astray after him, to go astray after Molech, from among their people.

— Leviticus 20:2–5

In 1 Kings, Solomon is portrayed as introducing the cult of Moloch to Jerusalem:

Then did Solomon build a high place for Chemosh the detestation of Moab, in the mount that is before Jerusalem, and for Molech the detestation of the children of Ammon.

— New Revised Standard Version

This is the sole instance of the name Moloch occurring without the definite article in the Masoretic text: it may offer a historical origin of the Moloch cult in the Bible, or it may be a mistake for Milcom, the Ammonite god (thus the reading in some manuscripts of the Septuagint).

In 2 Kings, Moloch is associated with the tophet in the valley of Gehenna when it is destroyed by king Josiah:

And he defiled Topheth, which is in the valley of the son of Hinnom, that no man might make his son or his daughter to pass through the fire to Molech.

— 2 Kings23:10 Jewish Publication Society of America Version

The same activity of causing children "to pass over the fire" is mentioned, without reference to Moloch, in numerous other verses of the Bible, such as in Deuteronomy (Deuteronomy 12:31, 18:10), 2 Kings (2 Kings 16:3; 17:17; 17:31; 21:6), 2 Chronicles (2 Chronicles 28:3; 33:6), the Book of Jeremiah (Jeremiah 7:31, 19:5) and the Book of Ezekiel (Ezekiel 16:21; 20:26, 31; 23:37).

Lastly, the prophet Jeremiah condemns practices associated with Moloch as showing infidelity to Yahweh:

And they built the high places of Baal, which are in the valley of the son of Hinnom, to set apart their sons and their daughters unto Molech; which I commanded them not, neither came it into My mind, that they should do this abomination; to cause Judah to sin.

— Jeremiah 32:35

Given the name's similarity to the Hebrew word melek "king", scholars have also searched the Masoretic text to find instances of melek that may be mistakes for Moloch. Most scholars consider only one instance as likely a mistake, in Isaiah:

For a hearth is ordered of old; yea, for the king [melek] it is prepared, deep and large; the pile thereof is fire and much wood; the breath of the LORD, like a stream of brimstone, doth kindle it.

— Isaiah 30:33

=== Septuagint and New Testament ===
The standard text of the Septuagint, the Greek version of the Old Testament, contains the name "Moloch" (Μολόχ) at 2 Kings 23:10 and Jeremiah 30:35, as in the Masoretic text, but without an article. Moreover, the Septuagint uses the name Moloch in Amos where it is not found in the Masoretic text:

You even took up the tent of Moloch and the star of your god Raiphan, models of them which you made for yourselves.

— Amos 5:26, cf. Masoretic Amos 5:26

Additionally, some Greek manuscripts of Zephaniah 1:5 contain the name "Moloch" or "Milcom" rather than the Masoretic text's "their king," the reading also found in the standard Septuagint. Many English translations follow one or the other of these variants, reading either "Moloch" or "Milcom". However, instead of "Moloch", the Septuagint translates the instances of Moloch in Leviticus as "ruler" (ἄρχων), and as "king" (βασιλεύς) at 1 Kings 11:7. (Note: The Lucian recension of the Septuagint contains the name "Milcom" at 1 Kings 11:7.)

The Greek version of Amos with Moloch is quoted in the New Testament and accounts for the one occurrence of Moloch there (Acts 7:43).

== Theories ==
=== As a deity ===
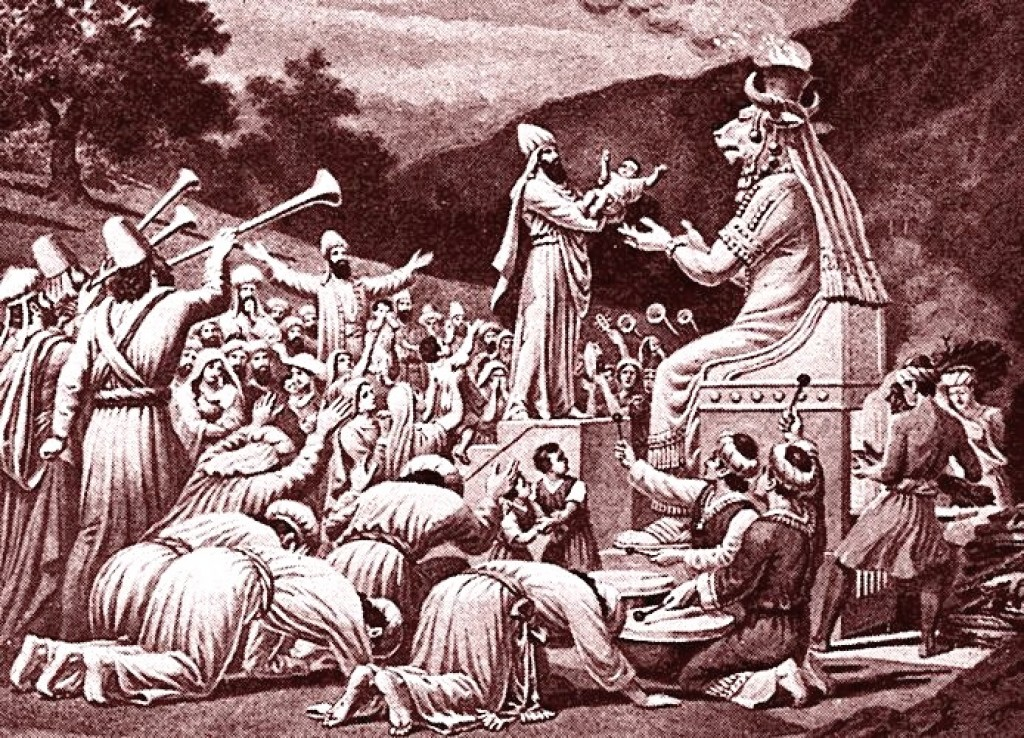
Artist's view of a sacrifice to Moloch in Bible Pictures with brief descriptions by Charles Foster, 1897

Before 1935, all scholars held that Moloch was a pagan deity, to whom child sacrifice was offered at the Jerusalem tophet. Some modern scholars have proposed that Moloch may be the same god as Milcom, Adad-Milki, or an epithet for Baal.

G. C. Heider and John Day connect Moloch with a deity Mlk attested at Ugarit and Malik attested in Mesopotamia and proposes that he was a god of the underworld, as in Mesopotamia Malik is twice equated with the underworld god Nergal. Day also notes that Isaiah seems to associate Moloch with Sheol. The Ugaritic deity Mlk also appears to be associated with the underworld, and the similarly named Phoenician god Melqart (literally "king of the city") could have underworld associations if "city" is understood to mean "underworld", as proposed by William F. Albright. Heider also argued that there was also an Akkadian term maliku referring to the shades of the dead.

The notion that Moloch is the name of a deity has been challenged for several reasons. Moloch is rarely mentioned in the Bible, is not mentioned at all outside of it, and connections to other deities with similar names are uncertain. Moreover, it is possible that some of the supposed deities named Mlk are epithets for another god, given that mlk can also mean "king". The Israelite rite conforms, on the other hand, to the Punic mlk rite in that both involved the sacrifice of children. None of the proposed gods Moloch could be identified with are associated with human sacrifice, the god Mlk of Ugarit appears to have only received animal sacrifice, and the mlk sacrifice is never offered to a god named Mlk but rather to another deity.

Brian Schmidt argues that the use of Moloch without an article at 1 Kings 11:7 and the use of Moloch as a proper name without an article in the Septuagint may indicate that there was a tradition of a god Moloch when the Bible was originally composed. However, this god may have only existed in the imagination of the composers of the Bible rather than in historical reality.

=== As a form of sacrifice ===
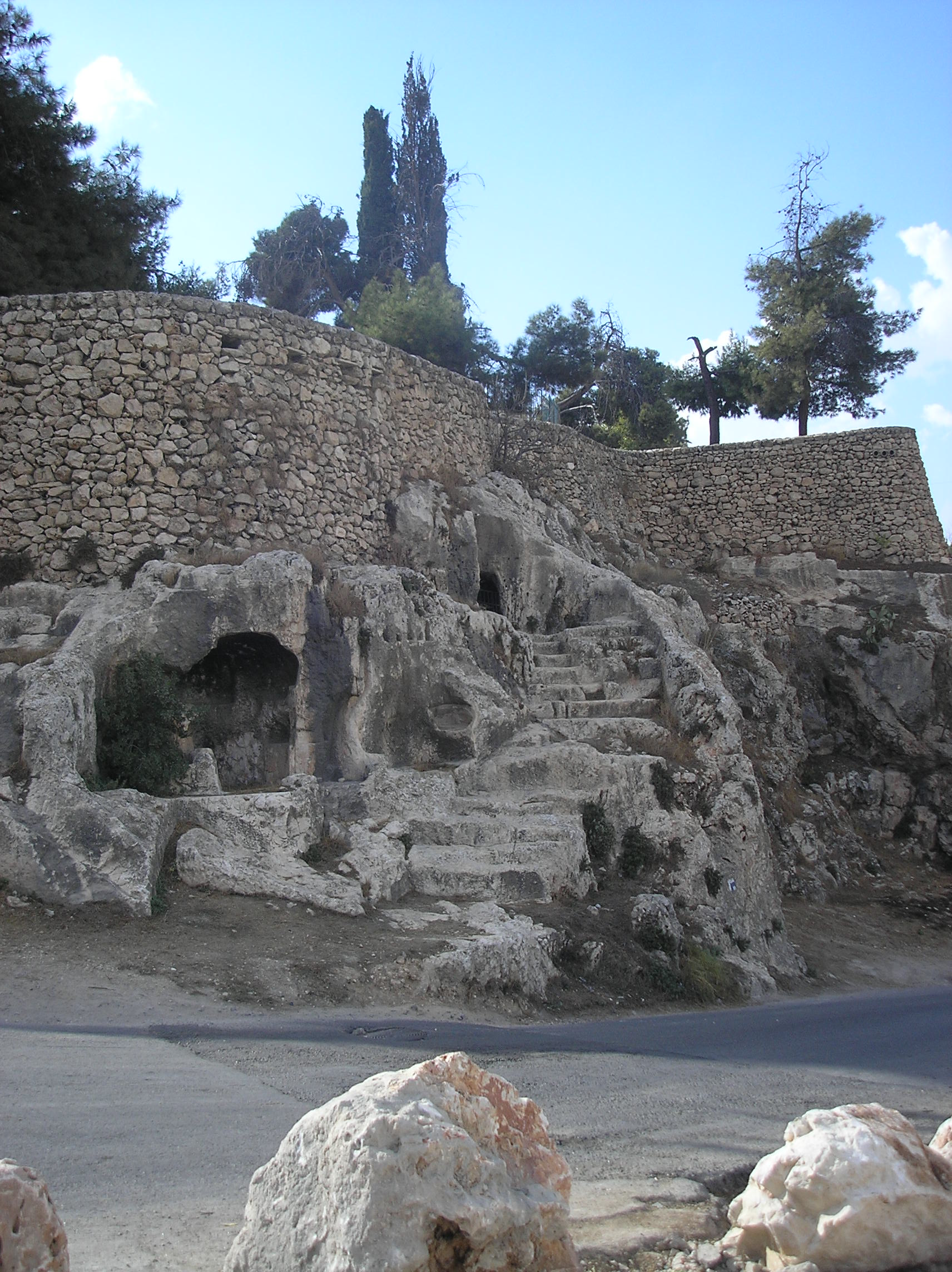
Tombs in the Valley of Hinnom, the location of the tophet, just outside the city of ancient Jerusalem, where Moloch rituals were performed according to 2 Kings 23:10

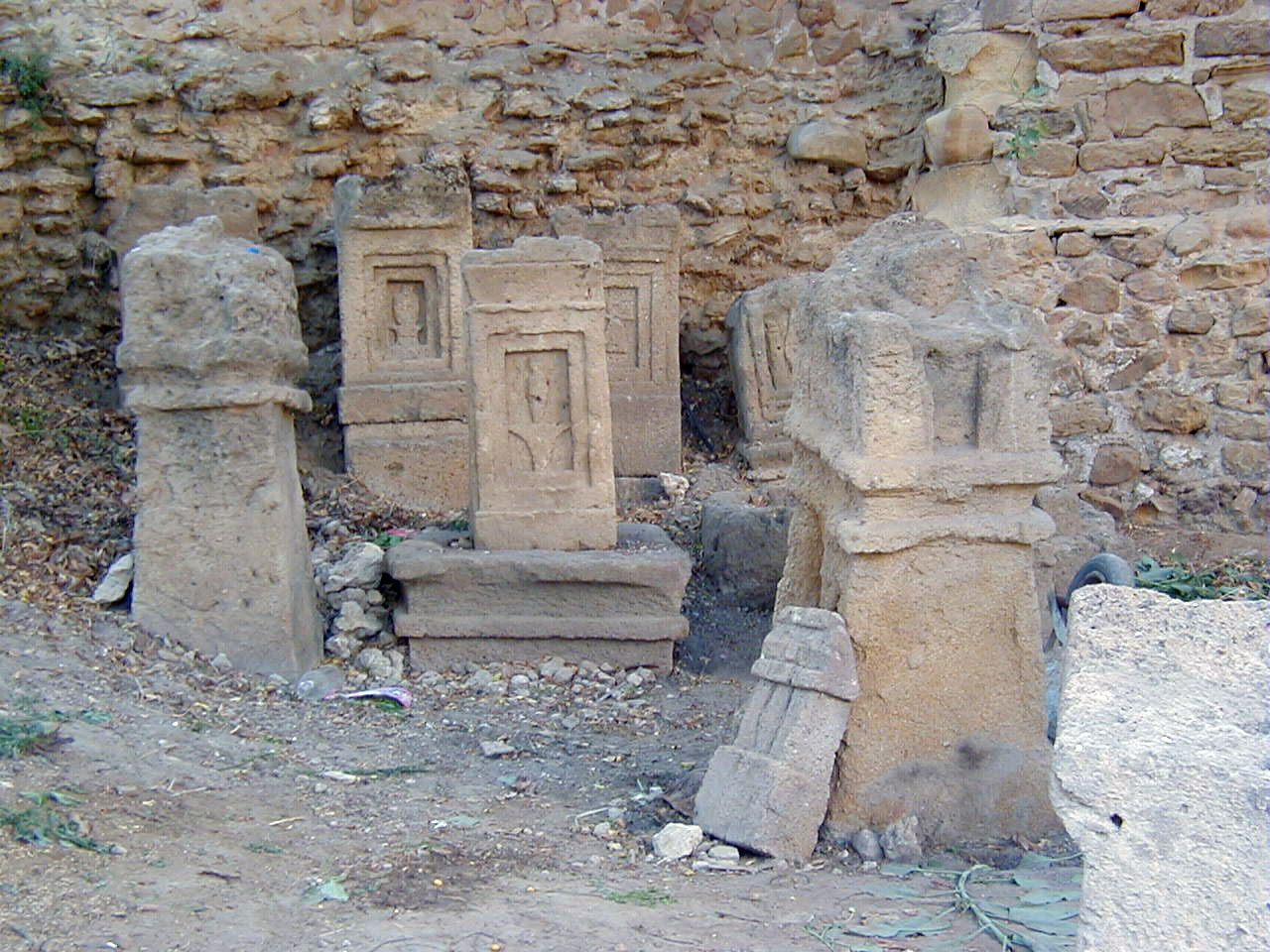
Stelas from the Tophet in Carthage, where mlk sacrifices or rituals are attested via inscription

In 1935, Otto Eissfeldt proposed, on the basis of Punic inscriptions, that Moloch was a form of sacrifice rather than a deity. Punic inscriptions commonly associate the word mlk with three other words: ʾmr (lamb), bʿl (citizen) and ʾdm (human being). bʿl and ʾdm never occur in the same description and appear to be interchangeable. Other words that sometimes occur are bšr (flesh). When put together with mlk, these words indicate a "mlk-sacrifice consisting of...". The Biblical term lammolekh would thus be translated not as "to Moloch", as normally translated, but as "as a molk-sacrifice", a meaning consistent with uses of the Hebrew preposition la elsewhere. Bennie Reynolds further argues that Jeremiah's use of Moloch in conjunction with Baal in Jer. 32:35 is parallel to his use of "burnt offering" and Baal in Jeremiah 19:4–5.

The view that Moloch refers to a type of sacrifice was challenged by John Day and George Heider in the 1980s. Day and Heider argued that it was unlikely that biblical commentators had misunderstood an earlier term for a sacrifice as a deity and that Leviticus 20:5's mention of "whoring after Moloch" necessarily implied that Moloch was a god. Day and Heider nevertheless accepted that mlk was a sacrificial term in Punic, but argue that it did not originate in Phoenicia and that it was not brought back to Phoenicia by the Punic diaspora. More recently, Anthony Frendo argues that the Hebrew equivalent to Punic ylk (the root of Punic mlk) is the verb ‘br "to pass over"; in Frendo's view, this means that the Hebrew Moloch is not derived from the same root as Punic mlk.

Since Day's and Heider's objections, a growing number of scholars have come to believe that Moloch refers to the mulk sacrifice rather than a deity. Francesca Stavrakopoulou argues that "because both Heider and Day accept Eissfeldt's interpretation of Phoenician-Punic mlk as a sacrificial term, their positions are at once compromised by the possibility that biblical mōlekh could well function in a similar way as a technical term for a type of sacrifice". She further argues that "whoring after Moloch" does not need to imply a deity as mlk refers to both the act of sacrificing and the thing sacrificed, allowing an interpretation of "whor[ing] after the mlk-offering". Heath Dewrell argues that the translation of Leviticus 20:5 in the Septuagint, which substitutes Greek: ἄρχοντας "archons, princes" for Moloch, implies that the biblical urtext did not include the phrase "whoring after Moloch". Bennie Reynolds further notes that at least one inscription from Tyre does appear to mention mlk sacrifice (RES 367); therefore Day and Heider are incorrect that the practice is unattested in Canaan (Phoenicia). Reynolds also argues for further parallels. However, Dewrell argues that the inscription is probably a modern forgery based on the unusual layout of the text and linguistic abnormalities, among other reasons.

Among scholars who believe that Moloch refers to a form of sacrifice, debate remains as to whether the Israelite mlk sacrifices were offered to Yahweh or another deity. Armin Lange suggests that the Binding of Isaac represents a mlk-sacrifice to Yahweh in which the child is finally substituted with a sheep, noting that Isaac was meant to be a burnt offering. This opinion is shared by Stavrakopoulou, who also points to the sacrifice of Jephthah of his daughter as a burnt offering. Frendo, while he argues that Moloch refers to a god, accepts Stavrakopoulou's argument that the sacrifices in the tophet were originally to Yahweh. Dewrell argues that although mlk sacrifices were offered to Yahweh, they were distinct from other forms of human or child sacrifice found in the Bible (such as that of Jephthah) and were a foreign custom imported by the Israelites from the Phoenicians during the reign of Ahaz.

=== As a divine title ===
Because the name "Moloch" is almost always accompanied by the definite article in Hebrew, it is possible that it is a title meaning "the king", as it is sometimes translated in the Septuagint. In the twentieth century, the philosopher Martin Buber proposed that "Moloch" referred to "Melekh Yahweh". A similar view was later expressed by T. Römer (1999). Brian Schmidt, however, argues that the mention of Baal in Jeremiah 32:35 suggests that "the ruler" could have instead referred to Baal.

=== As a rite of passage ===
A minority of scholars, mainly scholars of Punic studies, has argued that the ceremonies to Moloch are in fact a non-lethal dedication ceremony rather than a sacrifice. These theories are partially supported by commentary in the Talmud and among early Jewish commentators of the Bible. Rejecting such arguments, Paolo Xella and Francesca Stavrakopoulou note that the Bible explicitly connects the ritual to Moloch at the tophet with the verbs indicating slaughter, killing in sacrifice, deities "eating" the children, and holocaust. Xella also refers to Carthaginian and Phoenician child sacrifice found referenced in Greco-Roman sources.

== Religious interpretation ==
=== In Judaism ===
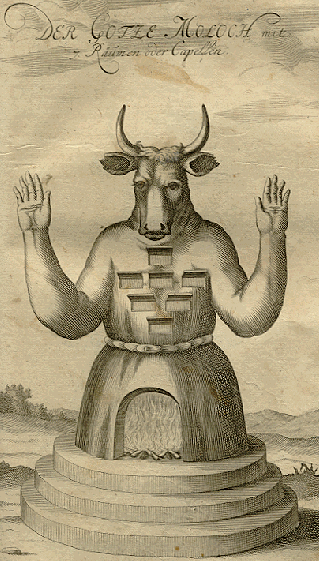
Der Götze Moloch mit 7 Räumen oder Capellen; "The idol Moloch with seven chambers or chapels" in Die Alten Jüdischen Heiligthümer, by Johann Lund, early eighteenth century. The illustration contains elements derived from the medieval rabbinical tradition.

The oldest classical rabbinical texts, the mishnah (3rd century CE) and Talmud (200s CE) include the Leviticus prohibitions of giving one's seed to Moloch, but do not clearly describe what this might have historically entailed. Early midrash regarded the prohibition to giving one's seed to Moloch at Leviticus 21:18 as no longer applicable in a literal sense. The Mekhilta of Rabbi Ishmael explains that Moloch refers to any foreign religion, while Megillah in the Babylonian Talmud explains that Moloch refers to the gentiles. Likewise, the late antique Targum Neofiti and the Targum Pseudo-Jonathan interpret the verse to mean a Jewish man having sex with a gentile. The earlier Book of Jubilees (2nd century BCE) shows that this reinterpretation was known already during the Second Temple Period; Jubilees uses the story of Dinah to show that marrying one's daughter to a gentile was also forbidden (Jubilees 30:10). Such non-literal interpretations are condemned in the Mishnah (Megilla 4:9).

Medieval rabbis argued about whether the prohibition of giving to Moloch referred to sacrifice or something else. For instance, Menachem Meiri (1249–1315) argued that "giving one's seed unto Moloch" referred to an initiation rite and not a form of idolatry or sacrifice. Other rabbis disagreed. The 8th- or 9th-century midrash Tanḥuma B gives a detailed description of Moloch worship in which the Moloch idol has the face of a calf and offerings are placed in its outstretched hands to be burned. This portrayal has no basis in the Bible or Talmud and probably derives from sources such as Diodorus Siculus on Carthaginian child sacrifice as well as various other classical portrayals of gruesome sacrifice. The rabbis Rashi (1040–1105) and Joseph ben Isaac Bekhor Shor (12th century) may rely on Tanḥuma B when they provide their own description of Moloch sacrifices in their commentaries. The medieval rabbinical tradition also associated Moloch with other similarly named deities mentioned in the Bible such as Milcom, Adrammelek, and Anammelech.

=== In Christianity ===
The Church Fathers only discuss Moloch occasionally, mostly in commentaries on the Book of Amos or the Acts of the Apostles (where Stephen summarizes the Old Testament before being martyred). Early Christian commentators mostly either used Moloch to show the sinfulness of the Jews or to exhort Christians to morality. Discussion of Moloch is also rare during the medieval period, and was mostly limited to providing descriptions of what the commentators believed Moloch sacrifice entailed. Such descriptions, as found in Nicholas of Lyra (1270–1349), derive from the rabbinical tradition.

During the Reformation, on the other hand, Protestant commentators such as John Calvin and Martin Luther used Moloch as a warning against falling into idolatry and to disparage Catholic practices. Jehovah's Witnesses understand Moloch as a god of worship of the state, following ideas first expressed by Scottish minister Alexander Hislop (1807–1865).

== In art and culture ==
=== In art ===
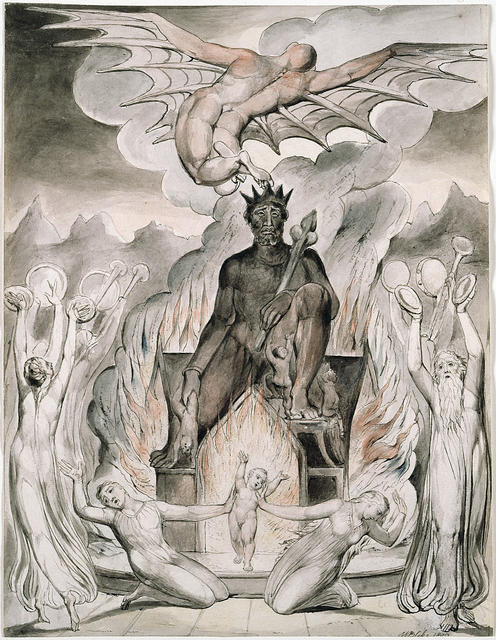
The Flight of Moloch, by William Blake, 1809. The work illustrates a scene from John Milton's On the Morning of Christ's Nativity.

Images of Moloch did not grow popular until the eighteenth and nineteenth centuries, when Western culture began to experience a fascination with demons. These images tend to portray Moloch as a bull- or lion-headed humanoid idol, sometimes with wings, with arms outstretched over a fire, onto which the sacrificial child is placed. This portrayal can be traced to medieval Jewish commentaries such as that by Rashi, which connected the biblical Moloch with depictions of Carthaginian sacrifice to Cronus (Baal Hammon) found in sources such as Diodorus, with George Foot Moore suggesting that the bull's head may derive from the mythological Minotaur. John S. Rundin suggests that further sources for the image are the legend of Talos and the brazen bull built for king Phalaris of the Greek city of Acragas on Sicily. He notes that both legends, as well as that of the Minotaur, have potential associations with Semitic child sacrifice.

In contrast, William Blake portrayed Moloch as an entirely humanoid idol with a winged demon soaring above in his "Flight of Moloch" one of his illustrations of Milton's poem On the Morning of Christ's Nativity.

=== In literature ===
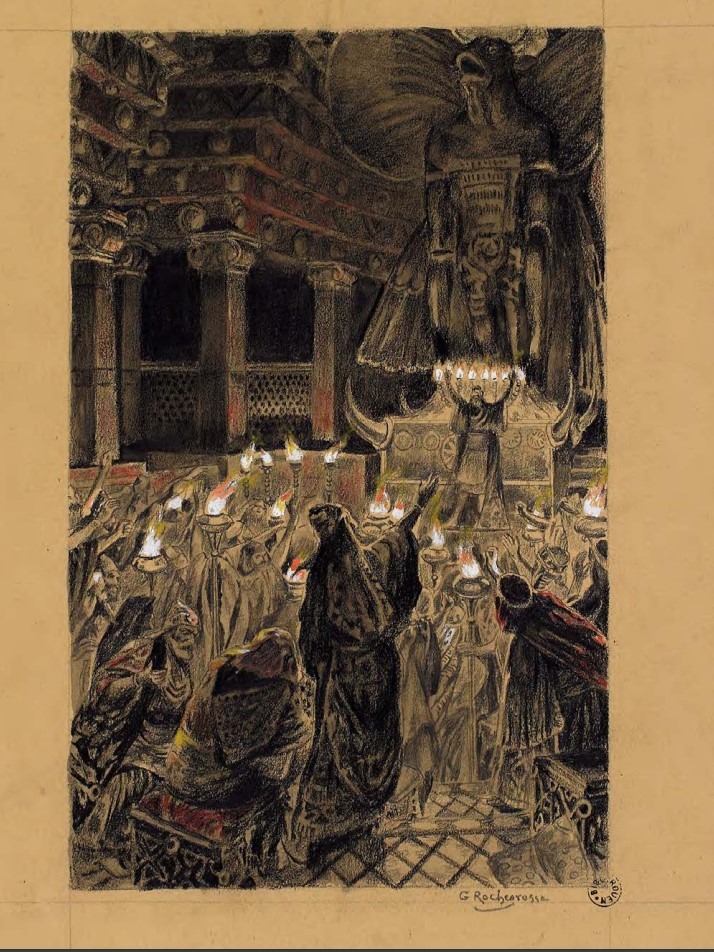
Illustration of the interior of the temple of Moloch from Gustav Flaubert's Salammbô by Georges-Antoine Rochegrosse (c. 1900)

Moloch appears as a child-eating fallen angel in John Milton's epic poem Paradise Lost (1667). He is described as "horrid king besmeared with blood / Of human sacrifice, and parents’ tears" (1:392–393) and leads the procession of rebel angels. Later, Moloch is the first speaker at the council of hell and advocates for open war against heaven. Milton's description of Moloch is one of the most influential for modern conceptions of this demon or deity. Milton also mentions Moloch in his poem "On the Morning of Christ's Nativity", where he flees from his grisly altars. Similar portrayals of Moloch as in Paradise Lost can be found in Friedrich Gottlieb Klopstock's epic poem Messias (1748–1773), and in Alfred, Lord Tennyson's poem The Dawn, where Moloch represents the barbarism of past ages.

In Gustave Flaubert's Salammbô, a historical novel about Carthage published in 1862, Moloch is a Carthaginian god who embodies the male principle and the destructive power of the sun. Additionally, Moloch is portrayed as the husband of the Carthaginian goddess Tanit. Sacrifices to Moloch are described at length in chapter 13. The sacrifices are portrayed in an orientalist and exoticized fashion, with children sacrificed in increasing numbers to burning furnaces found in the statue of the god. Flaubert defended his portrayal against criticism by saying it was based on the description of Carthaginian child sacrifice found in Diodorus Siculus.

From the nineteenth century onward, Moloch has often been used in literature as a metaphor for some form of social, economic or military oppression, as in Charles Dickens' novella The Haunted Man (1848), Alexander Kuprin's novel Moloch (1896), and Allen Ginsberg's long poem Howl (1956), where Moloch symbolizes American capitalism, and consumer culture.

Moloch is also often used to describe something that debases society and feeds on its children, as in Percy Bysshe Shelley's long poem Peter Bell the Third (1839), Herman Melville's poem The March into Virginia (1866) about the American Civil War, and Joseph Seamon Cotter, Jr.'s poem Moloch (1921) about the First World War.

=== As social or political allegory ===
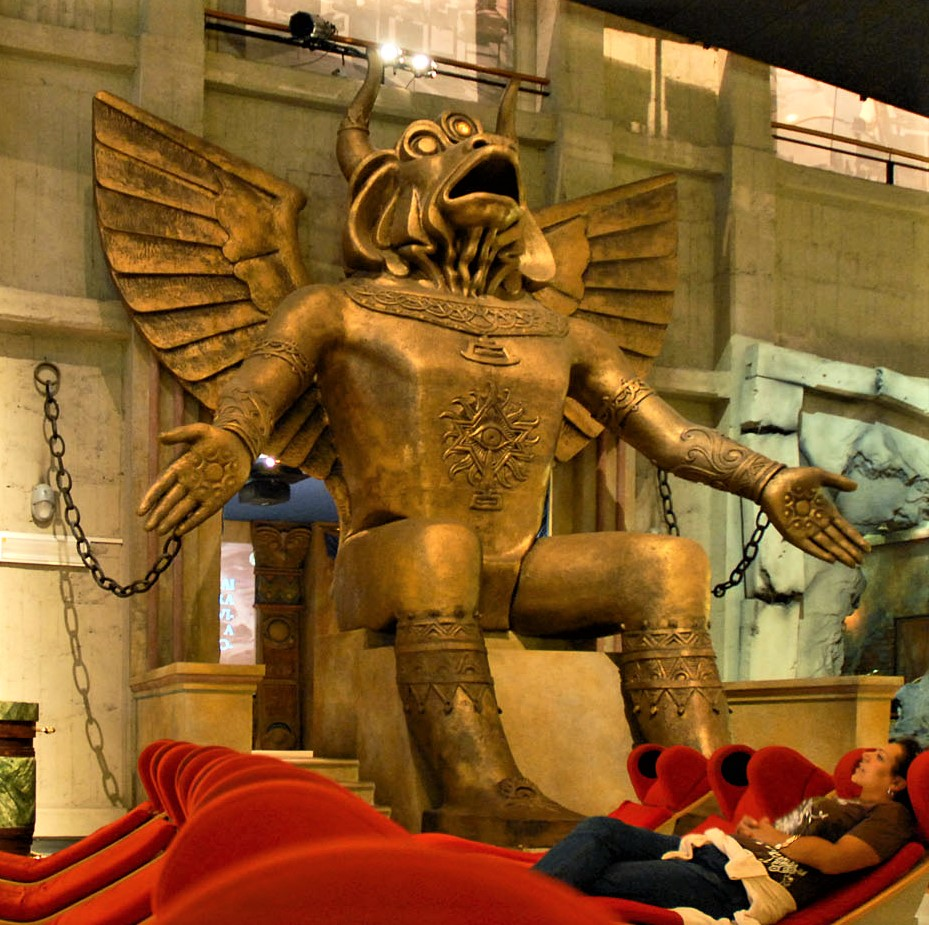
Moloch statue from Giovanni Pastrone's Cabiria (1914), National Museum of Cinema (Turin)

In modern times, a metaphorical meaning of Moloch as a destructive force or system that demands sacrifice, particularly of children, has become common. Beginning with Samuel Laing's National Distress (1844), the modern city is often described as a Moloch, an idea found also in Karl Marx; additionally, war often comes to be described as Moloch.

The Munich Cosmic Circle (c. 1900) used Moloch to describe a person operating under cold rationalism, something they viewed as causing the degeneration of Western civilization. Conservative Christians often rhetorically equate abortion with the sacrifice of children to Moloch. Bertrand Russell, on the other hand, used Moloch to describe a kind of cruel, primitive religion in A Freeman's Worship (1923); he then used it to attack religion more generally.

=== In film and television ===
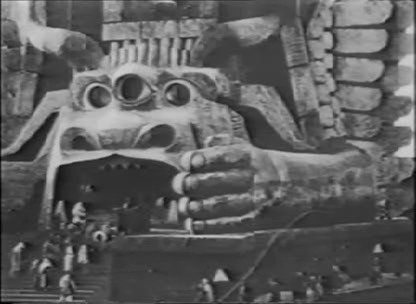
The entrance to the Temple of Moloch in Carthage in Cabiria (1914), which was demolished after the filming of Cabiria. There is a recreation of this temple in Cinecittà World theme park which serves as the entrance to the theme park.

The 1914 Italian film Cabiria is set in Carthage and is loosely based on Flaubert's Salammbô. The film features a bronzed, full-three dimensional statue of Moloch which is today kept in National Museum of Cinema in Turin, Italy. The titular female slave Cabiria is saved from the priests of Moloch just before she was to be sacrificed to the idol during the night. The depiction of the sacrifices to Moloch are based on Flaubert's descriptions, while the entrance of Moloch's temple is modeled on a hellmouth. Cabiria's depiction of the temple and statue of Moloch would go on to influence other filmic depictions of Moloch, such as that in Fritz Lang's Metropolis (1927), in which it is workers rather than children who are sacrificed, and Sergio Leone's The Colossus of Rhodes (1961).

Moloch has continued to be used as a name for horrific figures who are depicted as connected to the demon or god but often bear little resemblance to the traditional image. This includes television appearances in Stargate SG1 as an alien villain, in Buffy the Vampire Slayer, Supernatural, and Sleepy Hollow.

== See also ==
- Maalik
- Idolatry
- Lamia
- Laon
