= William Blake's illustrations of On the Morning of Christ's Nativity =

Illustrations of On the Morning of Christ's Nativity by William Blake

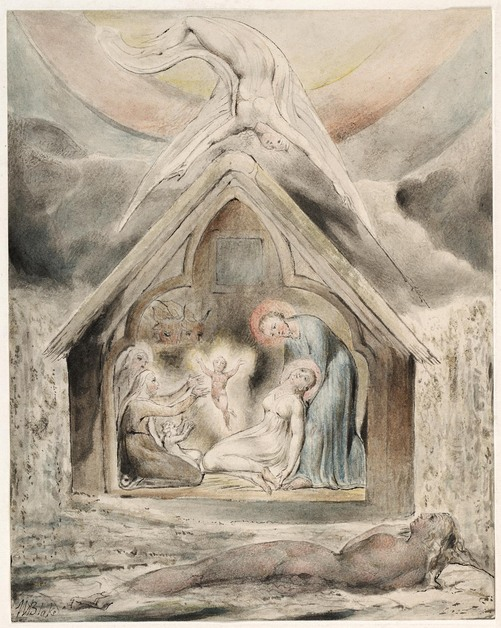
The Descent of Peace, 1803–1817, most likely c. 1815

William Blake drew and painted illustrations for John Milton's nativity ode On the Morning of Christ's Nativity between 1803 and 1815. A total of 16 illustrations are extant: two sets of six watercolours each, and an additional four drawings in pencil.

The dating of the sets is unknown, as is Blake's intended sequence for the illustrations. The two sets of watercolours are known as the "Butts set" and the "Thomas set", after their respective patrons, or as the "Huntington set" and the "Whitworth set" after the Huntington Library and the Whitworth Art Gallery, which now hold the sets in their collections.

== Provenance ==
There is little record of the provenance of the Thomas set or the Butts set before 1852 and 1872, which has led to disputes about the dating. What is known is that the "Thomas set" was commissioned by the Reverend Joseph Thomas, who had also commissioned illustrations to Milton's Comus and Paradise Lost from Blake. No contract for the commission is extant, but the commissioning probably took place in 1809, which is the year in which the illustrations were completed. Blake was eager to accept the commission, according to G. E. Bentley, because "Milton illustrations were a kind of work which Blake could not resist." They presumably stayed in the Revd Thomas's family until they were bought at Sotheby's from an anonymous seller in 1872. By 1876 they were in the collection of J.E. Taylor, who gave them to the Whitworth in 1892.

Even less is known about the dates of composition for the "Butts set" - between 1811 and 1820, Blake created at least thirty three designs for Thomas Butts, which included the illustrations of On the Morning of Christ's Nativity. Later, they passed from Butts to his son, who sold them at Sotheby's in 1852, passed through several more hands, were sold at Christie's in 1912, and in 1916 were sold to Henry Huntington.

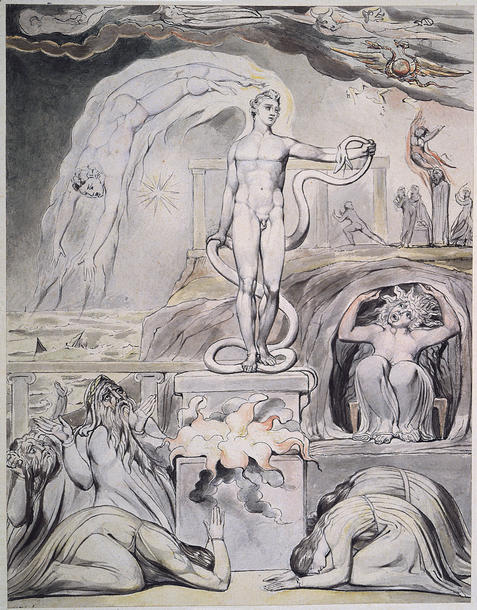
The Overthrow of Apollo and the Pagan Gods, watercolour, 25 x 19.3 cm, 1809. The figure of Apollo in this illustration is a combination of the Apollo Belvedere and the Laocoön

== Dating and sequence ==
The illustrations themselves do not make the dating any easier- the edges of the "Thomas set" were trimmed before sale at Sotheby's, leaving "18" or "180" on most of the sheets. Only The Night of Peace bears the full date of 1809. The Butts set is entirely undated- dates from 1803 to 1817 have been proposed for it. Behrendt argues that the Butts set predates the Thomas set by six years, and Collins Baker and R.R. Wark place it in 1809, but earlier than the Thomas set.

The sequence of the illustrations is also a topic of scholarly dispute: the mountings of the Thomas set were inscribed on their backs with numbers 1–6, but these were added during or after the 1872 Sotheby's sale, and so are unlikely to follow Blake's intended order. This "original" order ran thus:

1. The Descent of Peace
2. The Annunciation to the Shepherds
3. The Flight of Moloch
4. The Old Dragon
5. The Overthrow of Apollo and the Pagan Gods
6. The Night of Peace

Geoffrey Keynes placed them in 1-6-2-3-4-5 order, so that The Night of Peace followed The Descent of Peace, because of their similar subjects. Butlin, and nearly all subsequent scholars, have rejected this, as much commentary has centered upon Blake's use of similar images to frame the sequence. Butlin instead rearranges the "original" sequence as 1-2-4-5-3-6, moving The Flight of Moloch to second to last, so that it matches the order of corresponding verses in Milton's poem. Dunbar also follows Butlin's order. Behrendt adopts a 1-2-5-3-4-6 order, seeing a thematic progression from the destruction of classical aesthetics, to the Old Testament cruelty of Moloch (who resembles Blake's Urizen), to Satan himself. This order is followed by Werner in her Blake's Vision of the Poetry of Milton.

== Analysis ==
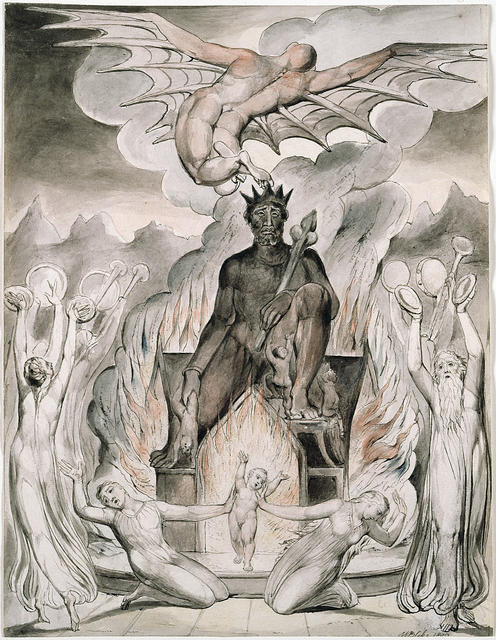
The Flight of Moloch, watercolour, 25.7 x 19.7 cm. 1809

Blake's literary debt to Milton is key to understanding his illustrations of the earlier poet's writings. In general, Milton: a Poem is a guide to Blake's idea of Milton: that he possessed true spiritual vision, but fell by his adherence to the moralistic and repressive tenets of puritanism and by his preference for the cruel and distant Jehovah of the Old Testament over the redemptive figure of Christ. In that regard the Nativity Ode is to Blake the rebirth of Milton's poetry into the creative imagination of Christ. Blake also sees a return to prophetic, Christian ideals of poetry, rather than the "pagan" classical aesthetic represented in The Overthrow of Apollo and the Pagan Gods by the figure of Apollo, who is modeled on the Apollo Belvedere.

Blake's prophetic book Europe: a Prophecy was especially influenced by On the Morning of Christ's Nativity. In that poem, the messianic Orc, a symbol of pure creative energy, rises against the repressive institutions of Church and state. Orc is part of a doomed cycle- his rebellion is inevitably countered by the increased institutional repression of Urizen. Europe in that light is seen as a pessimistic parody of Milton's poem. Orc is often associated with fire, and the closest parallel with him is found in The Flight of Moloch, where a child is about to be given to the god of sacrifice. The similarity of the orifice that frames the child to the shape of the stable in the other illustrations underscores the purpose of Christ's birth, and foreshadows the harrowing of hell.

The illustrations emphasize the simultaneous occurrence of the events they depict by the presence of the stable in almost every image, and by framing the set with two very similar images that focus on the peaceful victory of Christ over darkness. The Descent of Peace also has neo-platonic implications- it represents the descent of the soul into the body, which is symbolized by the cramped stable.

== Table of Illustrations ==
The order followed here is that given by Butlin.

Thomas set	Butts set	Title	Corresponding Stanzas with excerpt	Related works by Blake
		The Descent of Peace	Hymn, Stanzas 1-3 "It was the winter wild, While the Heav'n-born child, All meanly wrapt in the rude manger lies..."	The similarity between this c. 1800 tempera painting and the "Butts set" version was one of the main reasons Behrendt dated the "Butts set" to 1803
		The Annunciation to the Shepherds	Hymn, Stanzas 8-12 "At last surrounds their sight A globe of circular light, That with long beams the shame-fac'd Night array'd..."	
		The Old Dragon	Hymn, Stanza 18 "Th'old Dragon under ground, In straiter limits bound, Not half so far casts his usurped sway..."	The Beast and the Whore of Babylon, elsewhere associated with institutionalized religion by Blake, are here overthrown along with Satan
		The Overthrow of Apollo and the Pagan Gods	Hymn, Stanzas 19-23 "Apollo from his shrine Can no more divine, With hollow shriek the steep of Delphos leaving..."	
		The Flight of Moloch	Hymn, Stanza 23 "In vain with cymbals' ring They call the grisly king, In dismal dance about the furnace blue..."	The winged figure of the accuser, so like the spirit of Moloch, cements that god's identification with Blake's Spectre
		The Night of Peace	Hymn, Stanza 27 "Heav'n's youngest-teemed star, Hath fix'd her polish'd car, Her sleeping Lord with handmaid lamp attending..."	
