= Vyacheslav Nagovitsin =

Russian composer (1939–2023)

Vyacheslav Lavrent'yevich Nagovitsin (Russian: Вячеслав Лаврентьевич Наговицин; 21 December 1939 – 20 June 2023) was a Russian composer. He was a student of Dmitri Shostakovich at the Leningrad Conservatory and he graduated in 1966 (postgraduate school, he graduated from the undergraduate school of the Conservatory in 1963). In 1963–1964 he worked in Ulan-Ude Opera and Ballet Theater. In 1966–1970 he was a lecturer at the Mussorgsky Music School in Leningrad. In 1968–1970 he also worked as the music director of the Leningrad Comedy Theatre. Since 1970 he became a professor at the Leningrad Conservatory. He orchestrated two unfinished operas of Modest Mussorgsky: Zhenitba and Salammbô. His orchestration of Salammbô was used by Valery Gergiev at the Mérida festival in 1991.

Nagovitsin died on 20 June 2023, at the age of 83.

== Selected works ==
- Violin concerto, opus 21 (1970)
- Concerto for Violin and Orchestra
- Sonata for Flute and Piano
- Ballad for Ukraine

== Sources ==
- Moshevich, Sofia, Dmitri Shostakovich - Pianist (McGill-Queen's Press - MQUP, 2004) - ISBN 0-7735-2581-5
- Cummings, David, International Who s who in Music and Musicians Directory page 483 (Routledge, 2000) ISBN 0-948875-53-4
