= Salammbô (Rachmaninoff) =

Projected opera by Sergei Rachmaninoff

- Projected opera by Sergei Rachmaninoff
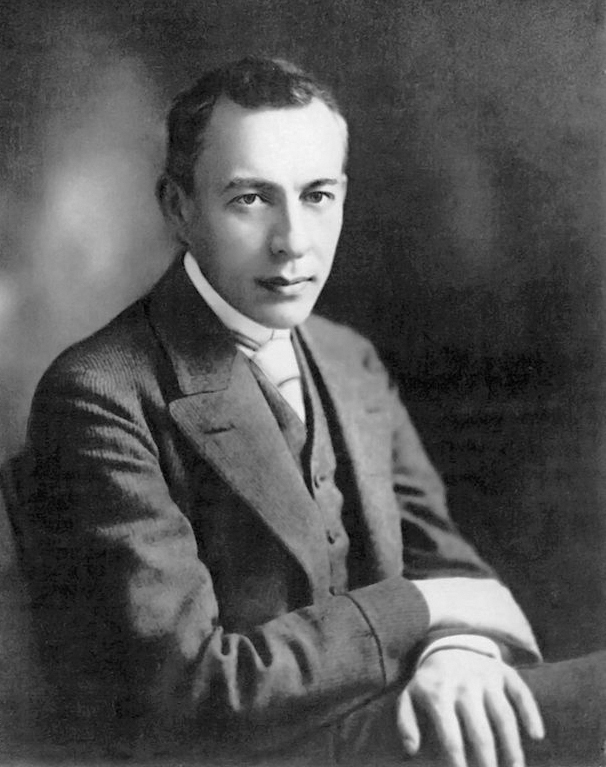
- Rachmaninoff in 1902
- Based on: Salammbô by Flaubert

Salammbô was a projected opera conceived by Russian composer Sergei Rachmaninoff around 1906. It was to be based on Salammbô, a historical novel by Gustave Flaubert. The idea was long thought about, but Rachmaninoff was unable to find a suitable librettist and aborted the idea when his wife and daughter fell ill.

== Background ==
After his two recent operas, The Miserly Knight (Op. 24, 1904) and Francesca da Rimini (Op. 25, 1905), achieved little success, Rachmaninoff eagerly considered another, larger project. Previously, he had made no written mention of this, but it is clear that he put great thought into the project, evidenced by a letter that he wrote to his friend Nikita Morozoff on March 19, 1906, which gives a scene-by-scene outline. The letter also requests that his friend contact Mikhail Svobodin, a journalist known for poetry, and ask him to write the libretto. Svobodin did not respond, so Morozoff attempted to write some, but Rachmaninoff rejected his work in favor of another friend, Mikhail Slonoff. Slonoff worked for a few weeks, but Rachmaninoff was never satisfied, and on May 24 wrote to Slonoff reporting that he was unable to compose anything. A few days after the letter, Rachmaninoff's wife and daughter became sick and the project was terminated.

Rachmaninoff was still eager to produce an opera, and in 1908 worked on another called Monna Vanna, but it was left unfinished, and he did not complete another opera during his life.
