= Alexander Polezhayev =

Russian poet

Alexander Ivanovich Polezhayev
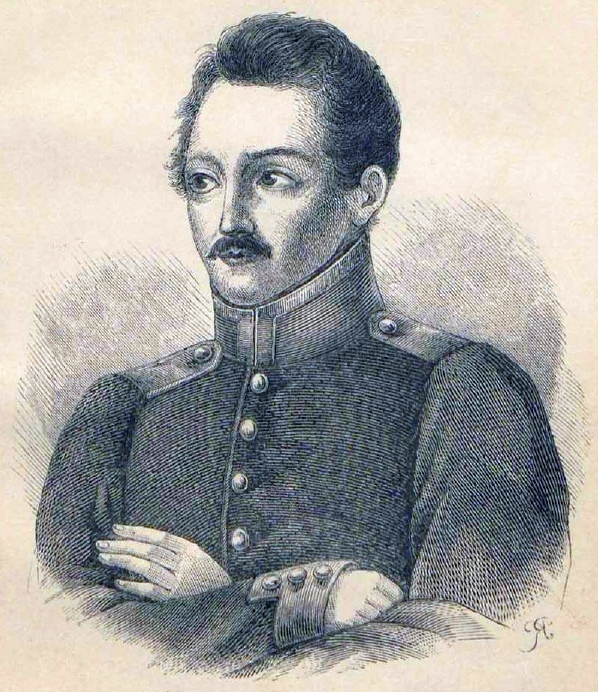
- The Works (1892) illustration, Leipzig
- Born: 11 September 1804; Penza Governorate, Russian Empire
- Died: 28 January 1838 (aged 33); Moscow, Russian Empire
- Education: Moscow University
- Writing career
- Period: 1825-1838
- Genre: Poetry
- Subjects: Political and social satire
- Notable work: Sashka (1826)

Alexander Ivanovich Polezhayev (Russian: Алекса́ндр Ива́нович Полежа́ев; 11 September [O.S. 30 August] 1804 – 28 [O.S. 16] January 1838) was a controversial Russian poet, best known for his satirical poem Sashka which in 1826 resulted in his being demoted to the Russian Army in the Caucasus, by a special decree of Nicolas I who saw this daring challenge as a continuation of the Decembrist revolt. He was arrested by the police, brought to the tsar, and forced to recite the poem out loud in the presence of the emperor, after which the emperor said, "I give you the means of rehabilitating yourself by military service. Are you ready to serve as a private in the army?" His service in the military was considered admirable by those who otherwise would have disliked Polezhayev.

Polezhayev continued to write satires (describing the Russian Tsar as 'a hangman' and 'an Emperor corporal') and in the early 1830s became close to the radicals, one of whom, Alexander Herzen, later remembered him with great warmth in his book of memoirs My Past and Thoughts. A volatile and rebellious character prone to heavy drinking, Polezhayev got involved in a series of incidents, the last of which resulted in his being punished by flogging so severe, fragments of twigs had to be extracted surgically form his back. After that, in the course of several months, Alexander Polezhayev fell ill with tuberculosis and died.

"Polezhayev's fate was of a peculiar, I'd say proto-Soviet kind. The Tsarist army became his GULAG," wrote poet and Russian poetry historian Yevgeny Yevtushenko.
