= Otto Eissfeldt =

German Protestant theologian

Otto Eißfeldt, spelled alternatively Otto Eissfeldt, (September 1, 1887, in Northeim – April 23, 1973, in Halle) was a German Protestant theologian, known for his work on the Old Testament and comparative near-east religious history. His magisterial 860-page The Old Testament: An Introduction (1934, 1965), giving a detailed literary-critical assessment of the history of the formation of each part of the Old Testament on the basis of the documentary hypothesis, has been called the "best of its kind".

== Life ==
Born in Northeim in Germany, Eissfeldt studied Protestant theology and Oriental languages from 1905 to 1912 at the University of Göttingen and Berlin's Humboldt University. He earned his habilitation in Berlin in 1913 with a thesis on Old Testament, and his PhD in Göttingen in 1916. From 1913 to 1922 he taught in Berlin, before being appointed in 1922 to the chair of Old Testament at the University of Halle-Wittenberg, where he remained professor for the rest of his life, also serving as a visiting professor at the University of Tübingen. He retired in 1957, and died at Halle in 1973.

== Work ==
Eissfeldt was one of the leading representatives of the literary-critical approach in Biblical criticism, following in the school of Julius Wellhausen and Rudolf Smend, with Hermann Gunkel and Wolf Wilhelm Friedrich von Baudissin his teachers in the area of religious history. A prolific writer, his Hexateuchsynopse (Hexateuch synopsis, 1922) and Einleitung in das Alte Testament (Introduction to the Old Testament, 1934, 1956, 1964, 1976) are outstanding examples of his literary-critical research achievements, while his numerous works on Phoenician religion (based in particular on the texts from Ugarit) were leading works in the field of near-east religious history.

He also edited the bible commentary series Handbuch zum Alten Testament (Guide to the Old Testament, 1937–77), and Joseph Aistleitner's Wörterbuch der ugaritischen Sprache (Dictionary of the Ugaritic Language, 1963), as well as the third edition of Biblia Hebraica (1929–37) with Albrecht Alt after the death of Rudolf Kittel.

== Philosophy ==
Eissfeldt's scholarship was influenced particularly by Johann Philipp Gabler and Søren Kierkegaard to see an uncrossable chasm between history and faith, with Religionsgeschichte or the history of religions being the prerogative of the former and biblical theology being the prerogative of the later. He defined the faith displayed by the Old Testament (and New Testament) as well as that necessary for the Christian or Jewish believer, to be only that which is timeless and eternal and which can neither be judged by history and reason, nor judge them. Thus it was only and always from this sort of "faith" that one could pursue or benefit from biblical theology. In this respect, he agreed with the absolutism or idealism of neo-orthodoxy. He defined history as the enterprise which sought to make known, through historical-critical method, the particulars of Old Testament (and New Testament) religious times and events without accepting any value or truth judgments concerning them. Thus it was only and always from this sort of "historical" inquiry that one could pursue or benefit from Religionsgeschichte. In that respect, he agreed with the scientific positivism of liberal scholarship. In order for Eissfeldt to maintain both positions, it was necessary that they be held perpetually separate and in tension. This was also the only way each one as so defined could achieve its purest expression. His way of resolving the paradox of this separation between history and faith was a relativism that arbitrarily chose the answers from one side over the other when it seemed most beneficial to the objective or was judged to belong to the category of one side and not the other.

== See also ==
- Biblia Hebraica Stuttgartensia
