= The Loves of Salammbo =

- Directed by: Sergio Grieco
- Screenplay by: Mario Caiano; Sergio Grieco; Giuseppe Mangione; Andre Tabet; Georges Tabet
- Based on: Salammbo by Gustave Flaubert
- Produced by: Luigi Nannerini
- Starring: Jeanne Valérie; Jacques Sernas; Edmund Purdom; Arnoldo Foà
- Cinematography: Piero Portalupi
- Production companies: Stella Film; Fides Films
- Distributed by: Cineriz (Italy); Unidex (France)
- Release date: 16 September 1960 (Italy)
- Running time: 110 minutes
- Countries: Italy; France

The Loves of Salammbo (Italian: Salambò, French: Salammbô) is a 1960 historical drama directed by Sergio Grieco. It is loosely based on the novel Salammbô by Gustave Flaubert.

== Cast ==
- Jacques Sernas: Mathos
- Jeanne Valérie: Salammbò
- Edmund Purdom: Narr Havas
- Riccardo Garrone: Hamilcar Barca
- Arnoldo Foà: Spendius
- Charles Fawcett : Hanon
- Brunella Bovo : Neshma (Italian version)
- Kamala Devi : Neshma (French version)
- Ivano Staccioli: Gell

== Censorship ==
When Salammbò was first released in Italy in 1960 the Committee for Theatrical Review of the Italian Ministry of Cultural Heritage and Activities reviewed the film. They decided that in order for the film to be screened publicly, the Committee recommended the removal of the scene in which Mathos, lying in bed, sensuously kisses Salammbò on her neck and her chest repeatedly. The reason for the restriction, cited in the official documents, is that the scene is considered to be offensive to decency and morality. The official document number is: N° 31319, it was signed on 30 Mar 1960 by Minister Umberto Tupini.

== Release ==
The Loves of Salammbo was released in Italy on 16 September 1960 with a 110-minute running time. It was released in the United States in October 1962 with a 72-minute running time.
