= Joan Bernard Armstrong =

American judge

Joan Bernard Armstrong (February 15, 1941 – June 9, 2018) was an African-American judge. In 1974, Armstrong was elected to the Orleans Parish Juvenile Court bench as the first woman and first African-American woman elected judge in the state of Louisiana.

Armstrong graduated from Xavier University in 1963.

Armstrong taught school by day to attend night classes at Loyola University New Orleans College of Law. She graduated with a Juris Doctor in 1967.

In January 1974, then governor Edwin Edwards appointed Armstrong to the Orleans Parish Juvenile Court bench. Six months later, she broke barriers when she was elected to the position without opposition. Armstrong was the first woman and first African-American woman elected judge in the state of Louisiana

In 1984, Armstrong was elected without opposition to Louisiana's Fourth Circuit Courts of Appeal. Armstrong was the first woman judge elected to that court.

In 2003, Armstrong became the first African-American chief judge for the Louisiana's Fourth Circuit Courts of Appeal.

During her tenure on the bench, Armstrong was chairman of the Louisiana Conference of Court of Appeal Judges from 2004 to 2005 and was also a member of the Judiciary Budgetary Board; Judicial Ethics Committee; Judicial Human Resources Committee; Louisiana Commission on Law Enforcement and the Administration of Criminal Justice.

Armstrong retired from the bench in 2011 after 37 years, which made her the longest-serving judge in the state at the time.

Armstrong was born, and she died in New Orleans, Louisiana at age 77. A widow, she is survived by two children: a son, Rev. David Armstrong; a daughter, Anna Armstrong Alexander; and two grandchildren. She is also survived by a sister, Florence Bernard James.
