= Annabelle Bernard =

African-American Operatic Soprano

- Born: October 11, 1934; New Orleans, Louisiana
- Died: January 29, 2005 (aged 70) Metairie, Louisiana
- Occupation: Operatic soprano
- Years active: 1960–2000
- Formerly of: Deutsche Oper Berlin
- Spouse: Karl-Ernst Mercker

Annabelle Bernard (1934–2005) was an American operatic soprano who performed with the Deutsche Oper Berlin for approximately 40 years. Upon being hired by the Deutsche Oper Berlin in 1962, Bernard became the first black woman to be hired as a member of a major opera ensemble cast. She subsequently had many significant singing roles with the Deutsche Oper Berlin.

== Early life and education ==
Bernard was born on October 11, 1934, in New Orleans to parents Thomas Harry Bernard and Clothilde Williams Bernard. Bernard was the sister of Joan Bernard Armstrong, a judge in Louisiana.

Bernard began singing in public at a young age initially as a student at Fisk Elementary School and at the Fourth Baptist Church in New Orleans. Her formal training as a singer started at McDonough 35 High School in New Orleans with Edwin Hogan who was the voice teacher at the high school. Hogan arranged for Bernard to audition for Sister Mary Elise Sisson, SBS, who was the chairperson of the Department of Music at Xavier University in New Orleans.

Following her audition with Sisson, Bernard received an academic scholarship to enroll at Xavier University. She was a student there from 1952 to 1956, all the while training under Sisson. Sisson was herself an opera singer and had been establishing an opera training program at Xavier University that also included operatic mezzo-soprano Débria Brown. During Bernard's time at Xavier and continuing through her early career, Edith Rosenwald Stern became her patron.

Following her graduation from Xavier University, Bernard studied at the New England Conservatory of Music, earning a Masters of Arts degree in 1958. During her time there, Bernard performed as a soloist at the New England Opera Company. Also, at the New England Conservatory of Music, Bernard earned the Eleanor Steber Award and the Frank Huntington Beebe Scholarship.

Intending to become a professional opera singer in Italy, en route there she first stopped in Salzburg, Austria, to attend an operatic workshop. At the workshop, Bernard became acquainted with opera director and composer Hermann Reutter who suggested she enroll at the Stuttgart Music Academy. Studying at the academy for three years, Bernard was mentored by Maria Wetzelberger-Gluck.

During her time in Stuttgart, Bernard had radio appearances in Germany and Belgium, including winning the International Radio Competition. She eventually became a performer for a time at the Stuttgart State Opera. She was later a performer for one year with the Heidelberg Municipal Opera before moving to Berlin.

== Career ==
Bernard made her professional operatic debut by performing the lead role in Aida in Vienna on March 21, 1962, with the Berlin Opera. Herbert von Karajan conducted. She frequently performed with Karl Böhm. She became a permanent member of the Berlin Opera, with many leading roles over her forty-year career with the company.

The February 1, 1962, issue of Jet magazine referred to Bernard as the "newest negro opera star."

In 1964, Miss Bernard was in the world premiere of Roger Sessions' twelve-tone opera, Montezuma, in Berlin.

In November 1976, Bernard performed in her hometown of New Orleans having sung Maddalena di Coigny in Andrea Chénier. During her professional career, Bernard also performed at the Kennedy Center, at Carnegie Hall, and at Vatican City in the presence of Pope Paul VI.

Regarding spending her career mostly in Germany rather than the United States, Bernard was quoted by Stars and Stripes newspaper in a 1962 article, as saying:

"I would eventually like to return to the [United] States, but there's so little opportunity there if you want to sing opera. And if it means staying in Europe to sing – I stay."

In 1972 Bernard taught voice at the Hambourg Conservatory of Music. During her professional career in Germany, she married opera singer Karl-Ernst Mercker. She continued to use her birth name for her professional career.

=== Post-operatic career ===
Following her 2000 retirement from the Berlin Opera, Bernard returned to New Orleans. During her post-operatic years, she taught voice at Xavier University.

== Death ==
Bernard died on January 29, 2005, at Ochsner Medical Center in the New Orleans metropolitan area. She is interred at St. Louis Cemetery No. 3 in New Orleans.

== Awards and recognition ==
External media
- Media links about Annabelle Bernard

Images
- Photograph of Bernard while a student at Xavier University
- Photographs of Annabelle Bernard, courtesy of Counter Melody

Video
- Bernard singing the aria Tacea la Notte, audio recording with performance card

In 1970 Bernard received the German honorific title Kammersängerin in recognition of her operatic accomplishments.

Xavier University awarded an Honorary Doctorate of Music to Bernard in 1976, co-awarded with her mentor Sister Mary Elise Sisson.

In 2002, Bernard received the "Lift Every Voice" Legacy Award from the National Opera Association.

Subsequent to Bernard's death, Tulane University established the Clara del Marmol and Annabelle Bernard Fund, which sponsors a vocal concert series honoring Bernard and musicologist Clara del Marmol.
