= Zoltán Peskó =

Hungarian conductor and composer (1937–2020)

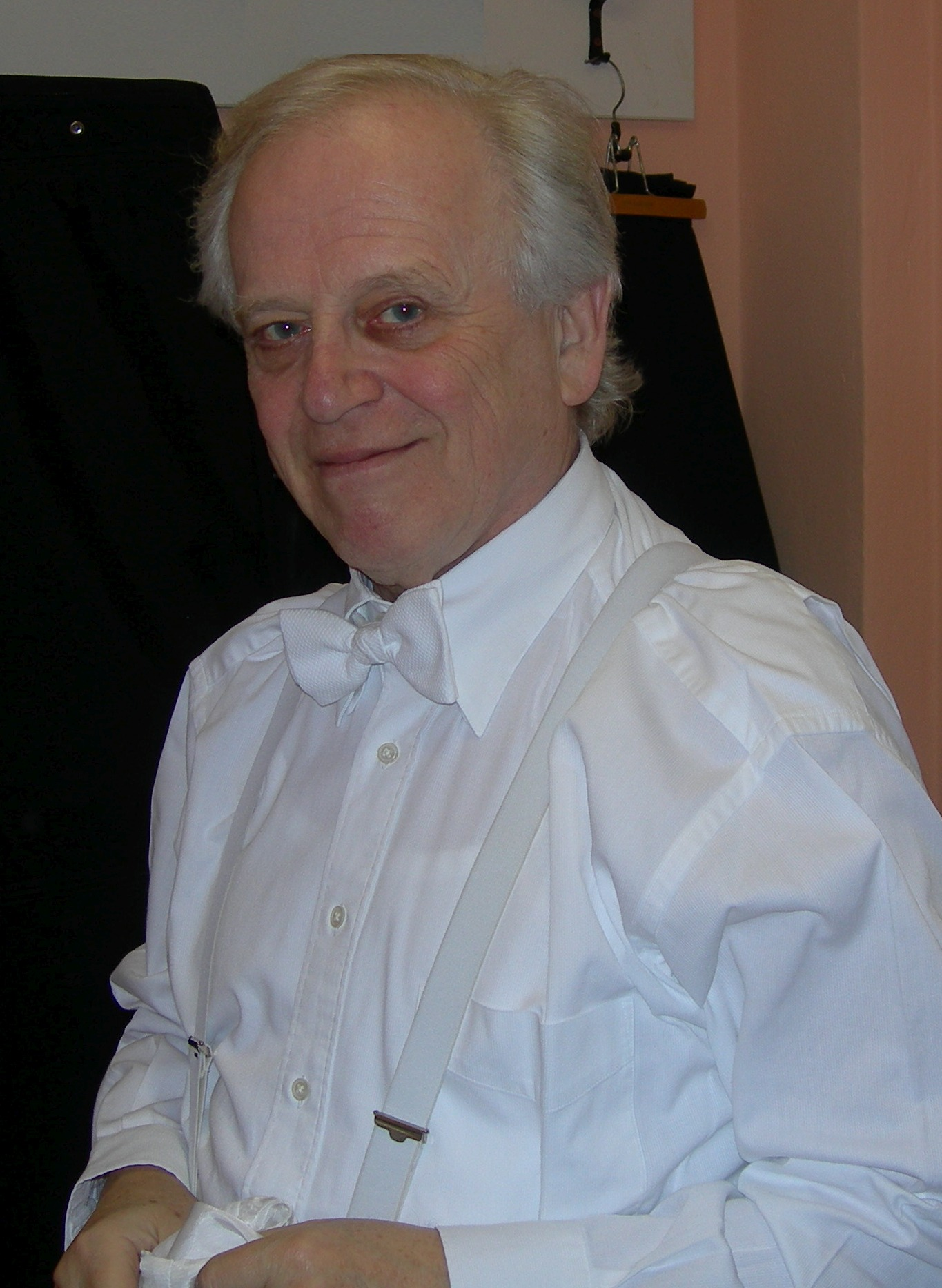
- Zoltán Peskó in 2006
- Born: 15 February 1937; Budapest, Hungary
- Died: 31 March 2020 (aged 83); Budapest, Hungary
- Education: Liszt Ferenc Academy of Music
- Occupations: Conductor; Academic lecturer
- Organizations: Deutsche Oper Berlin; Teatro Comunale di Bologna; La Fenice; La Scala; Teatro Nacional de São Carlos

Zoltán Peskó (15 February 1937 – 31 March 2020) was a Hungarian conductor and composer who held leading positions at German, Italian and Portuguese opera houses and orchestras, including the Deutsche Oper Berlin, Teatro Comunale di Bologna, La Fenice, and Teatro Nacional de São Carlos. He was a regular conductor at La Scala, where he promoted contemporary opera.

== Early life and education ==
Peskó was born in Budapest, Hungary, on 15 February 1937. He graduated from the Liszt Ferenc Academy of Music in 1962. He went on to study at the Accademia Nazionale di Santa Cecilia in Rome, then learned composition under Pierre Boulez in Basel in the 1960s. He also studied conducting under Franco Ferrara, and studied composition under Goffredo Petrassi.

== Career ==
He conducted at the Deutsche Oper Berlin from 1966 to 1973, was chief conductor of the Teatro Comunale di Bologna until 1976 and musical director of La Fenice in Venice until 1977. He was a regular conductor of the RAI Symphony Orchestra in Milan from 1978 to 1992.

Peskó first conducted at La Scala in Milan in 1970: Dallapiccola's Ulisse and Prokofiev's L'angelo di fuoco, directed by Antonello Madau-Diaz. He conducted the first performance in Milan of Mozart's La finta giardiniera at Piccola Scala, directed by Filippo Crivelli. There he promoted original programming including contemporary stage works such as operas composers of the Second Viennese School, Kurt Weill with Milva singing, and music by Aldo Clementi, Azio Corghi and Franco Donatoni, among others. In 1974, he conducted the Italian premiere of Schoenberg's Kol Nidre. A 1972 conversation of Peskó and Pierre Boulez about "Musical Aspects in Today's Musical Theatre" was published in 1978 in the journal Tempo.

In 1978, he led Bartók's Bluebeard's Castle, staged by Giorgio Pressburger, with Éva Marton and Kolos Kováts, coupled with Camillo Togni's Blaubart, staged by Maria Francesca Siciliani. In 1979, Peskó conducted Beethoven's Christus am Ölberge with the RAI Orchestra. He conducted three works by Stravinsky in 1982, the centenary of his birth: The Flood, Renard and Mavra, directed by Peter Ustinov. He also conducted one Verdi opera at La Scala, Luisa Miller in 1989, with Katia Ricciarelli in the title role.

Peskó was the Generalmusikdirektor of the Deutsche Oper am Rhein, based in Düsseldorf and Duisburg, from 1996 to 1999. His major programmes there included Verdi's La traviata and Otello, Wagner's Tristan und Isolde, and Mozart's Così fan tutte. There, he also conducted contemporary music, such as the German première of Giorgio Battistelli's Prova d’Orchestra (Orchesterprobe).

Peskó then served as chief conductor of the Orquestra Sinfónica Portuguesa, the orchestra of the Teatro Nacional de São Carlos in Lisbon, from 2001 to 2004. Among the highlights at the theatre was a performance of Tchaikovsky's rarely performed opera The Enchantress in a collaboration with the Mariinsky Theatre, staged by David Pountney. A review of The New York Times noted that Peskó's "conducting responded keenly to the flow of the drama, and the Sao Carlos orchestra rose to the challenge of the unfamiliar score". His tenure with the orchestra ended acrimoniously, with Peskó alleging that they had not paid him, while the orchestra claimed he had breached his contract by not spending sufficient time each year in Portugal. The labour court found in Peskó's favour, ordering the orchestra to pay him, but this decision was later overturned and the ruling against Peskó in favour of the orchestra was confirmed at the Supreme Court of Justice in 2013.

He was chief conductor of the Pannon Philharmonic in Pécs from 2009 to 2011. He made many recordings and lectured at the Musikhochschule Berlin.

In 2012, he suffered a stroke that left him unable to continue conducting. Peskó died in Budapest on 31 March 2020 at the age of 83.
