= Salammbô =

1862 historical novel by Gustave Flaubert

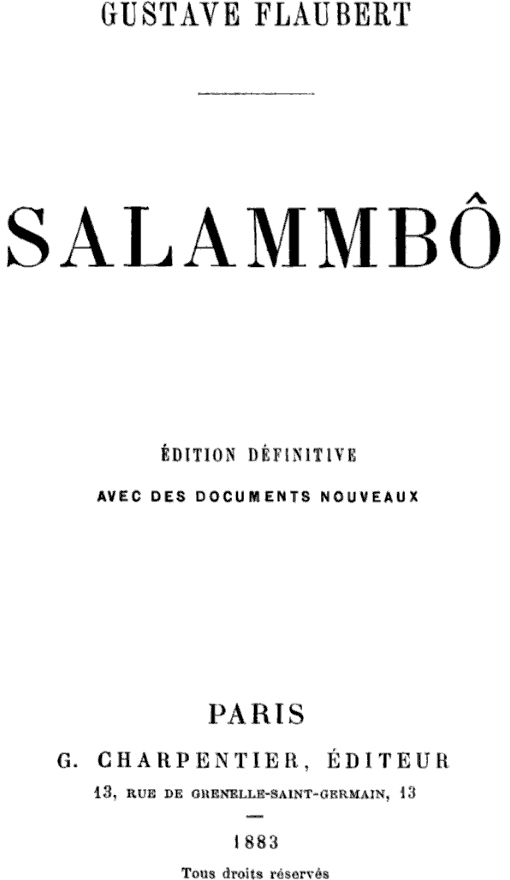
- Title page of Salammbô by Gustave Flaubert
- Author: Gustave Flaubert
- Translator: Eleanor Marx (1886)
- Language: French
- Genre: Historical fiction
- Publisher: Michel Lévy Frères
- Publication date: 1862
- Publication place: France
- Pages: 474 (first edition)
- Original text: Salammbô at French Wikisource

Salammbô is an 1862 historical novel by Gustave Flaubert, set in Carthage immediately before and during the Mercenary War (241–237 BCE). Flaubert's principal source was Book I of the Histories by the Greek historian Polybius.

The novel was enormously popular when first published in 1862. It was translated into English by Eleanor Marx in 1886, thus introduced to the English-speaking world and becoming an English-language bestseller.

The novel jumpstarted a renewed interest in the history of the Roman Republic's conflict with the North African Phoenician outpost of Carthage.

== Genesis ==
After the legal troubles that followed the publication of Madame Bovary, when he was tried and acquitted on charges of "immorality", Flaubert sought a less controversial subject for his next novel. In 1857, Flaubert decided to conduct research in Carthage, writing in March to Félicien de Saulcy, a French archeologist, about his plans. In a letter to Madame de Chantepie dated 23 January 1858, he described his anticipation: "I absolutely have to go to Africa. This is why, around the end of March, I will go back to the country of exotic dates. I am giddy with excitement. I will once again spend my days on horseback and my nights in a tent. What a happy breath I will take as I get onboard the steam boat in Marseilles!" From 12 April to 5 June 1858, Flaubert traveled to Tunisia, to explore the locations of his novel, though little survived from ancient times.

== Publication ==
Contemporary readers familiar with Flaubert's previous realistic work, Madame Bovary, and the legal controversy that followed its publication made Salammbô a bestseller, though its violence and sensuality bore little resemblance to Flaubert's previous work. It was praised for its style and story. Its descriptions of Cathagenian fashions influenced contemporary clothing styles, and the descriptions of Roman North Africa inspired new interest in archeological exploration there.

== Synopsis ==
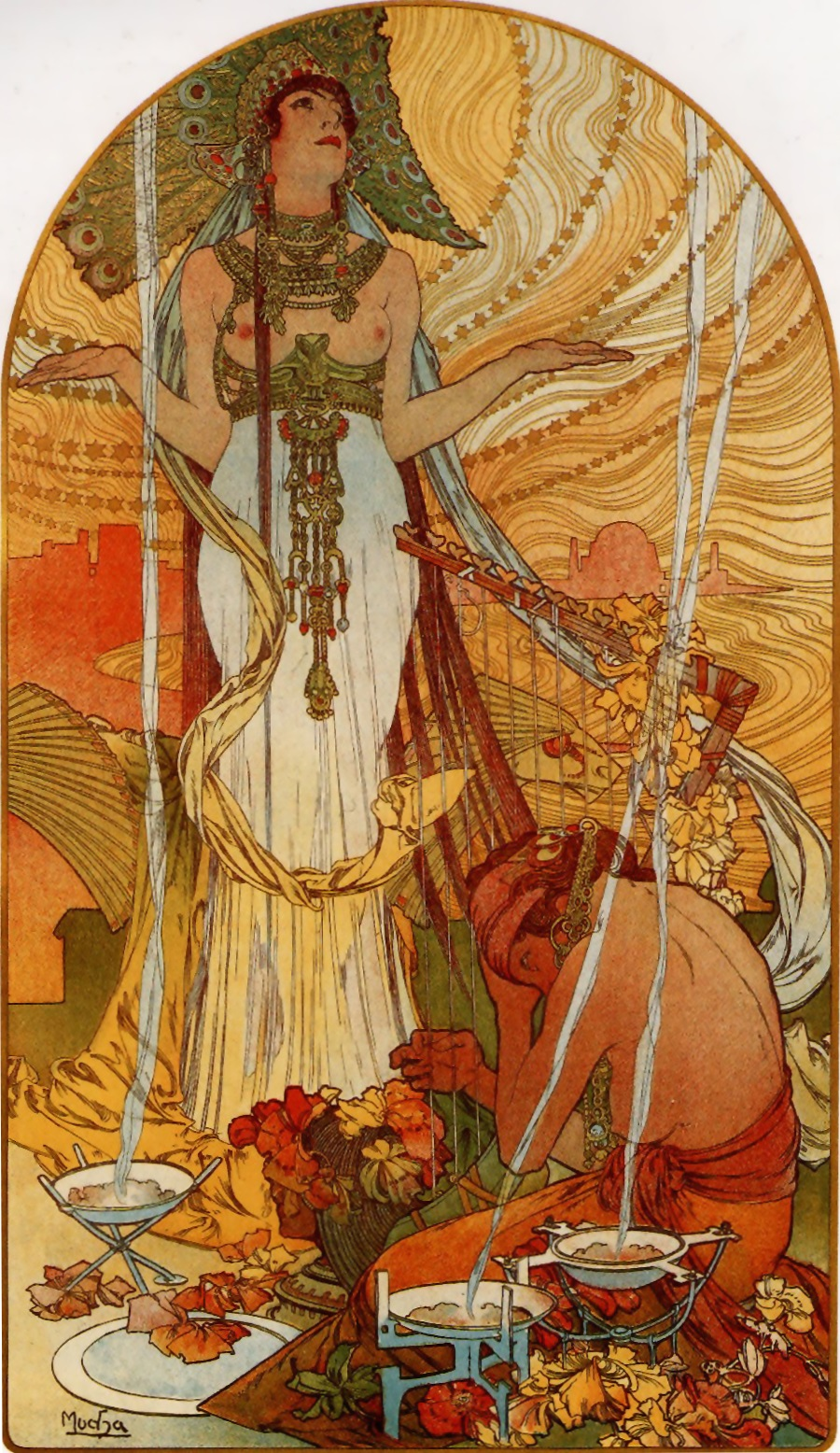
Salammbô by Alfons Mucha (1896)

After the First Punic War, Carthage is unable to fulfill promises made to its army of mercenaries, and finds itself under attack. The fictional title character, a priestess and the daughter of Hamilcar Barca, the foremost Carthaginian general, is the object of the obsessive lust of Matho, a leader of the mercenaries. With the help of the scheming freed slave, Spendius, Matho steals the sacred veil of Carthage, the Zaïmph, prompting Salammbô to enter the mercenaries' camp in an attempt to steal it back. The Zaïmph is an ornate bejewelled veil draped about the statue of the goddess Tanit in the sanctum sanctorum of her temple: the veil is the city's guardian and touching it will bring death to the perpetrator.

- Chapter 1. "The Feast". "It was at Megara, a suburb of Carthage, in the gardens of Hamilcar." The novel opens on a feast organized to celebrate the victory of the battle of Eryx, won against Rome. During the libations, the mercenaries ransack the place, spurred on by Hamilcar's absence, and the memories of the unkind and unfair way Carthage treated them throughout the war. Salammbô, Hamilcar's daughter, appears. She scolds them for their actions and entreats them to enjoy the feast without destroying the place. Two men stare at her: Narr' Havas, a troop leader from Numidia and Hamilcar's guest, and Matho, a Libyan wearing a necklace with a moon pendant. The young woman hands Matho a glass full of wine and he drinks from it. A Gaulish soldier tells him that, where he is from, this is an offer of intimacy. Jealous, Narr' Havas throws a javelin and wounds him. In the scuffle that ensues, Salammbô retreats to the palace, leaving Matho wondering. Spendius, a freed slave, tries to persuade Matho to take Carthage for the mercenaries.
- Chapter 2. "At Sicca". Two days, later, after much pleading and promises of payment, the mercenaries agree to leave the city. They walk for seven days and reach the holy city of Sicca. On the way there, a line of crucified lions creates a sense of unease. There, Spendius realizes that Matho is haunted by the memory of Salammbô, with whom he has fallen in love. The shophet, Hanno, a fat, leprous man, is sent to explain to them that Carthage has no money and will be delaying payment of its debt. Since the shophet only speaks a Punic language, Spendius offers to translate for the army and misrepresents Hanno's message in order to set the mercenaries against him. To make matters worse, Zarxas arrives and relates the treacherous massacre of 300 slingers who had stayed behind. As the dignitary flees in shame, fearing for his life, Spendius convinces the mercenaries to go back to Carthage.
- Chapter 3. "Salammbô". On a moonlit night, Salammbô appears on a palace terrace. She invokes Tanit, the lunar goddess and the city's tutelary deity, whose moods and phases greatly influence her. Raised within the limits of the palace and destined to a political alliance, Salammbô knows little, but as a priestess of Tanit, she wants to see the statue erected in the temple, in honor of the goddess. Schahabarim, a high priest, forbids it, as the sight of the statue is so powerful it might kill her. From afar, they catch sight of the mercenary army, closing in on Carthage.
- Chapter 4. "Beneath the Walls of Carthage". The mercenaries besiege Carthage; Matho and Spendius penetrate via the aqueduct.
- Chapter 5. "Tanit". Matho and Spendius steal the Zaïmph. Because Matho is caught while breaking into Salammbô's bedroom to see her again, she falls under suspicion of complicity.
- Chapter 6. "Hanno". The mercenaries leave Carthage and split into two groups, attacking Utica and Hippo-Zarytus. Hanno surprises Spendius at Utica, and occupies the city, but flees when Matho arrives and routs his troops.
- Chapter 7. "Hamilcar Barca". The hero returns and an attempt is made to blame him for Hanno's losses. He defends himself before the council and defends the mercenaries, but turns against the barbarians when he sees the damage they have done to his property.
- Chapter 8. "The Battle of the Macar". Hamilcar defeats Spendius at the bridge of the Macar river, three miles from Utica.
- Chapter 9. "In the Field". Hamilcar's troops are trapped by the mercenaries.
- Chapter 10. "The Serpent". Schahabarim sends Salammbô in disguise to retrieve the Zaïmph.
- Chapter 11. "In the Tent". Salammbô reaches Matho in his tent at the encampment. Believing each other to be divine apparitions, they make love. The mercenaries are attacked and dispersed by Hamilcar's troops. She takes away the Zaïmph, and on meeting her father, Hamilcar has her betrothed to Narr' Havas, who has changed sides.
- Chapter 12. "The Aqueduct". The Carthaginians return to their city with the mercenaries in pursuit. Spendius cuts off the water supply to Carthage.
- Chapter 13. "Moloch". Carthaginian children are sacrificed to Moloch. Hamilcar disguises a slave-child as his son Hannibal and sends him to die in his son's place.
- Chapter 14. "The Defile of the Axe". The drought is broken and aid comes. Hamilcar drives the mercenaries away from their encampments. Later, thousands of mercenaries are trapped in a defile and slowly starve (the Battle of the Saw). Deaths of Hanno and Spendius, both by crucifixion.
- Chapter 15. "Matho". Victory celebrations at Carthage. Matho is tortured before his execution; Salammbô, witnessing this, dies of shock. The Zaïmph has brought death upon those who touched it.

== Characters ==
The transliterations follow J. W. Matthews' English version.

- Abdalonim, the overseer of Hamilcar's stewards
- Autaritus (Autharite), a Gallic leader of the Mercenaries
- Demonades, a servant of Hanno
- Giddenem, the governor of Hamilcar's slaves
- Gisco (Gesco), a Carthaginian general
- Hamilcar Barca (Amilcar), Carthaginian general who led the mercenaries before the events of the book
- Hannibal, Hamilcar's young son
- Hanno (Hannon), a Carthaginian general (based on Hanno the Great and the Hannibal of the Mercenary War)
- Iddibal, a servant of Hamilcar
- Matho (or Mâthos), a Libyan leader of the Mercenaries
- Narr' Havas (Flaubert's spelling of Naravas), prince of the Numidians, and a leader of the Mercenaries
- Salammbô, daughter of Hamilcar
- Schahabarim, high priest of Tanith, and teacher of Salammbô
- Spendius, a slave of Hamilcar, captured at the Battle of Argunisae, who becomes a leader of the Mercenaries during the Revolt
- Taanach, a slave attending Salammbô
- Zarxas (Zarzas), a leader of the Mercenaries from the Balearic Isles

== Quotations ==
The opening passage:

It was at Megara, a suburb of Carthage, in the gardens of Hamilcar, that the soldiers whom he had commanded in Sicily were holding a great feast to celebrate the anniversary of the Battle of Eryx. The master was absent, their numbers were large, and accordingly they ate and drank in perfect freedom.

The description of child sacrifice in chapter 13:

The brazen arms were working more quickly. They paused no longer. Every time that a child was placed in them the priests of Moloch spread out their hands upon him to burden him with the crimes of the people, vociferating: "They are not men but oxen!" and the multitude round about repeated: "Oxen! oxen!" The devout exclaimed: "Lord! Eat!".

== Historical inaccuracies ==
Flaubert departed from the Greek historian Polybius's account of the Punic Wars when it suited his purposes. Though the mercenaries had executed a Carthaginian general named Hannibal, Flaubert did not want to contribute to confusion of that Hannibal with the far more familiar Hannibal who commanded the military forces of Carthage in the Second Punic War in the 3rd century BCE. He therefore changed the name of his character to Hanno, the name of other Carthaginian military figures of less prominence.

== English translations ==
=== Public Domain ===
1. Salammbô, first edition translated by Eleanor Marx (1886 with an erroneous 1862 publication date)
2. Salammbô, translated by M. French Sheldon (1885)
3. Salammbô, translated by J. S. Chartres (1886), published by Vizetelly & Co.
4. Salammbô, translated by Edward Powys Mathers (1931), published by Golden Cockerel Press

=== Active Copyright ===
- Salammbô, translated by Alban J. Krailsheimer (1977), published by Penguin Classics

== Adaptations ==
=== Musical ===
- Salammbô, an unfinished opera by Modest Mussorgsky (1863–66)
- Salammbô, an unfinished opera by Sergei Rachmaninoff
- Salammbô, an opera composed by Ernest Reyer based on Flaubert's novel (1890).
- Salammbo: Three orchestral suites op. 76, from the music for the 1925 film by Pierre Maradon
- Salammbo, an opera composed by Josef Matthias Hauer based on Flaubert's novel (1929).
- Salammbô, an opera by the French composer Philippe Fénelon, on a libretto by Jean-Yves Masson after Flaubert (1998)

=== Film ===
- Cabiria, a 1914 Italian silent film by Giovanni Pastrone
- Salambò, a 1915 Italian silent film by Domenico Gaido, released in Italy in October 1914. First U.S. release on 3 March 1915
- Salammbô, a 1925 silent film by Pierre Marodon, with music by Florent Schmitt
- The Loves of Salammbo, a 1962 sword and sandal film by Sergio Grieco
- In Orson Welles's film Citizen Kane, Charles Foster Kane's wife Susan sings the title role of Salammbô in a fictitious opera; the aria shown in the film was composed by Bernard Herrmann.

=== Stage ===
- "Salammbô", burlesque by A. Chanay (1911)
- Salambo, verse play by George Morrison von Schrader (1914)
- Salammbo, a play by Charles Ludlam (1988)

=== Other ===
- Salammbô, a series of science fiction graphic novel adaptations of the Flaubert novel, by Phillippe Druillet (1980, 1982, 1986)
- Salammbo: Battle for Carthage is a computer game by Dreamcatcher Interactive with artwork by Druillet. Its story is based on both Gustave Flaubert's and Phillipe Druillet's works (2003)
- "Salammbô" (1999) and "Salambô Redux" (2007), short stories by Caitlín R. Kiernan (1999)
- The Adventures of Alix, a historical comics series by Jacques Martin, inspired by the novel
- The Musée des Beaux-Arts in Rouen mounted an exhibition in 2021 called "Salambô: Fureurs! Passion! Éléphants!".

== In art ==
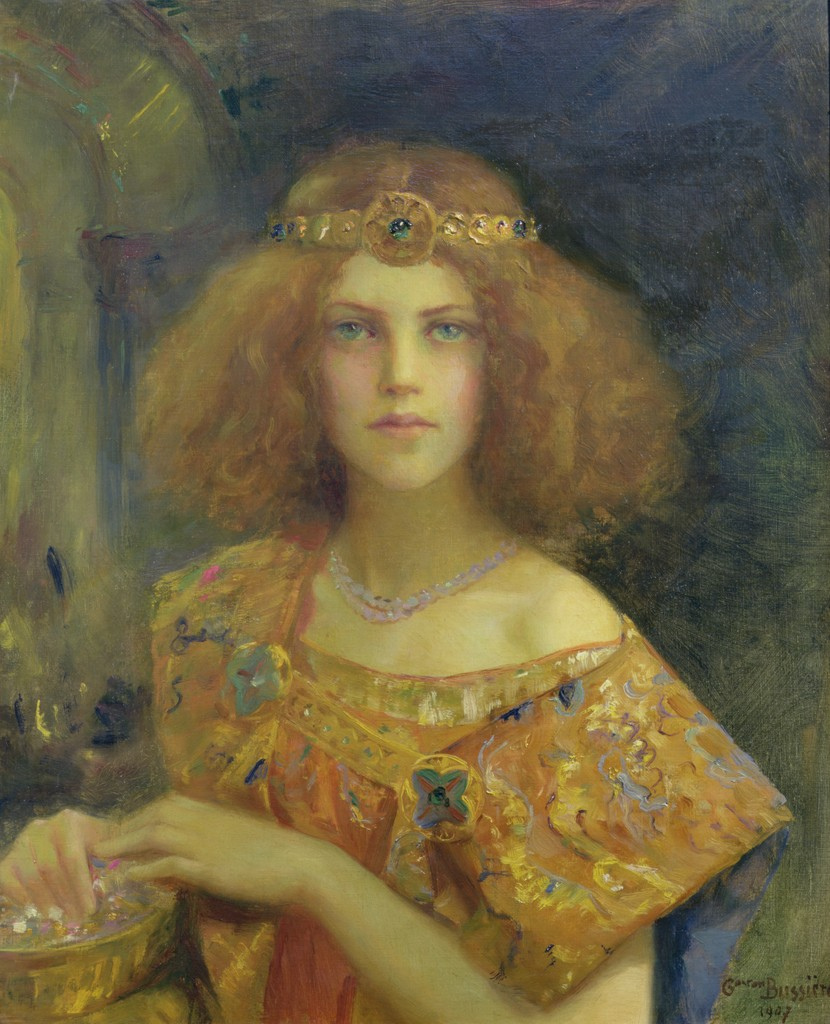
Salammbô, Gaston Bussière (1907)

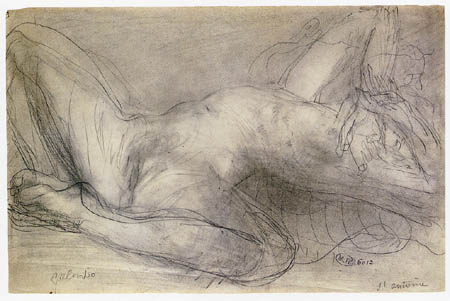
Salammbô by Auguste Rodin

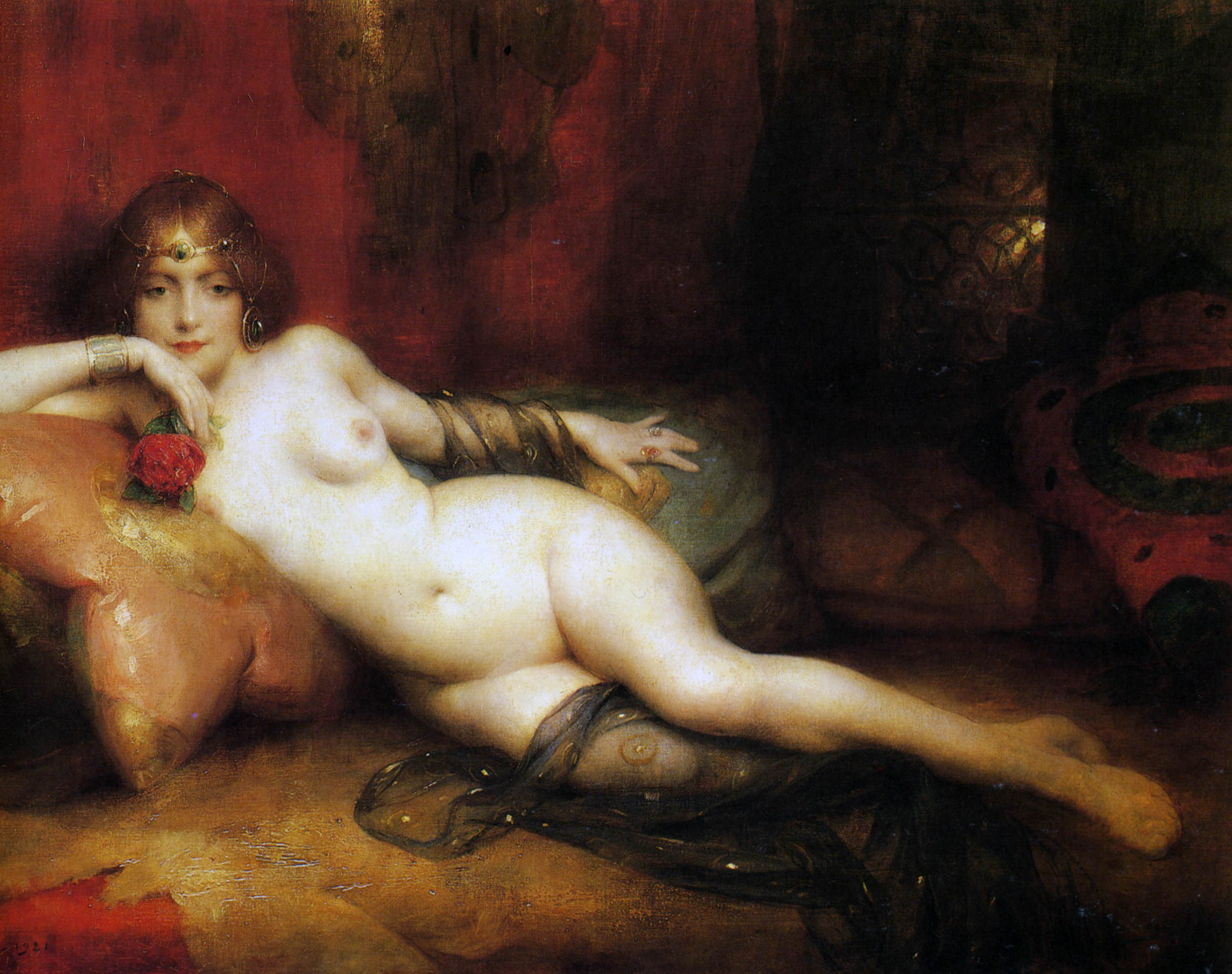
Salammbô by Henri Adrien Tanoux (1921)

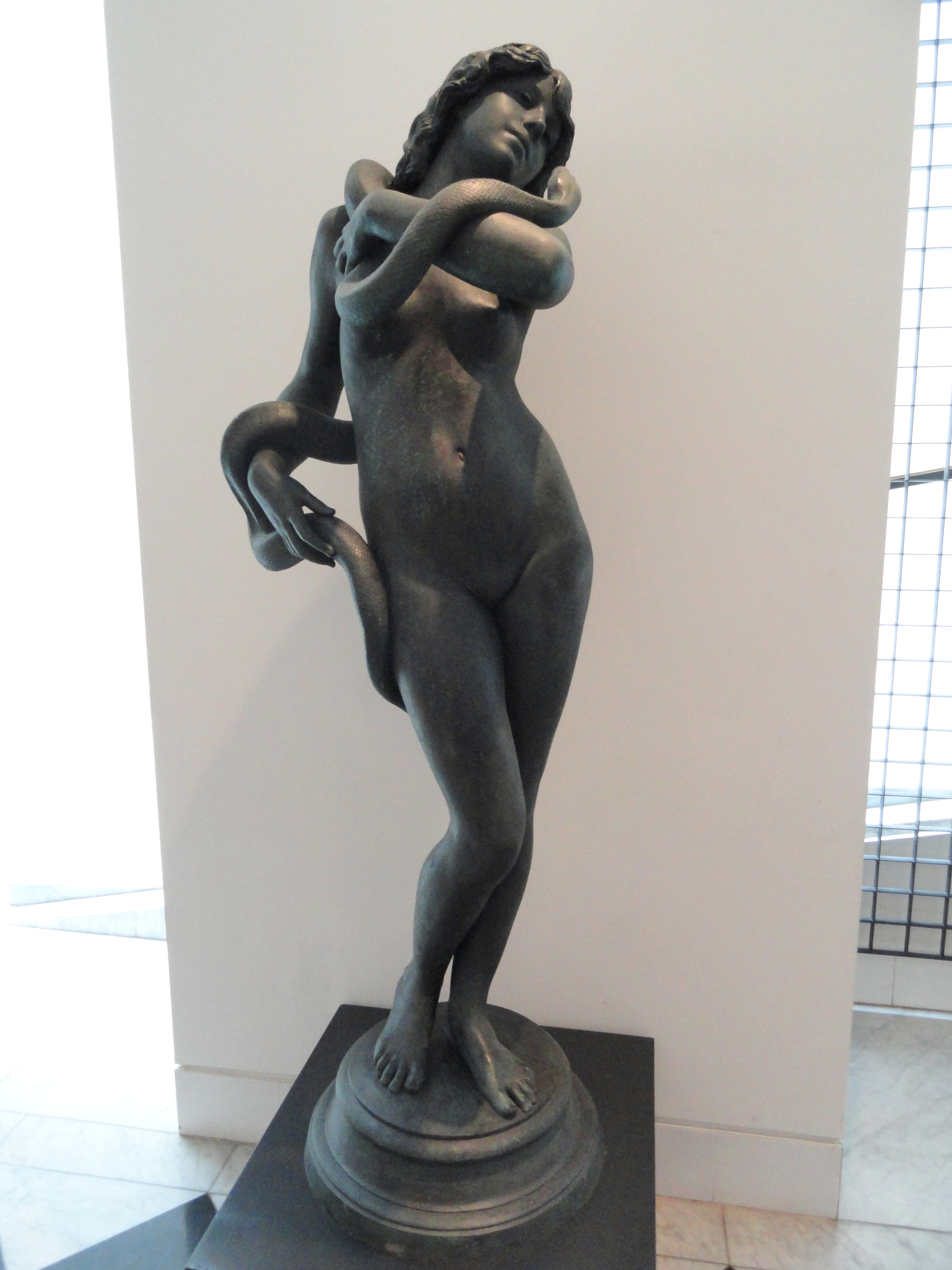
Salammbô, sculpture by Antonin Idrac (1903)

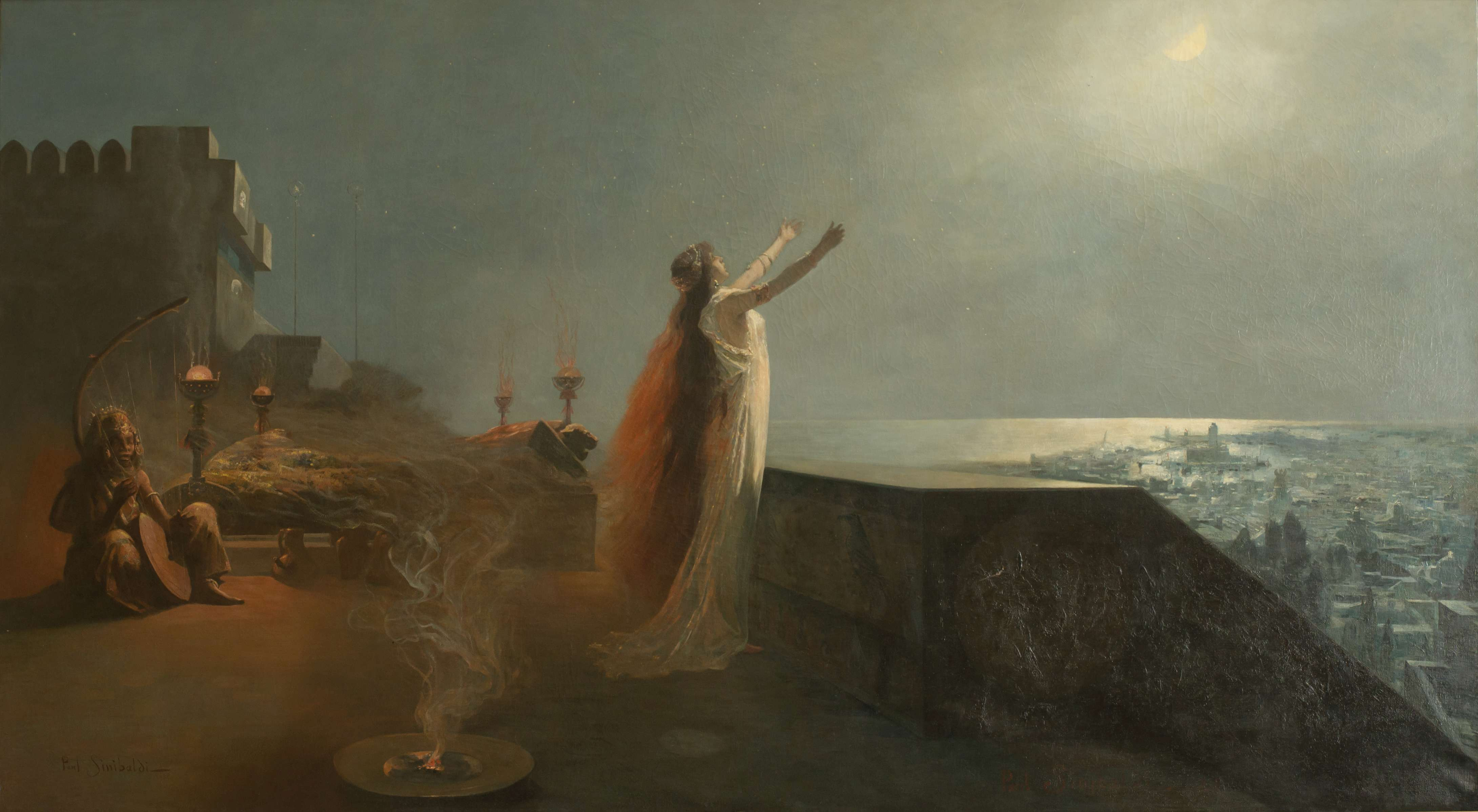
Salammbô by Jean-Paul Sinibaldi (1885)
