= Demon =

Evil supernatural being

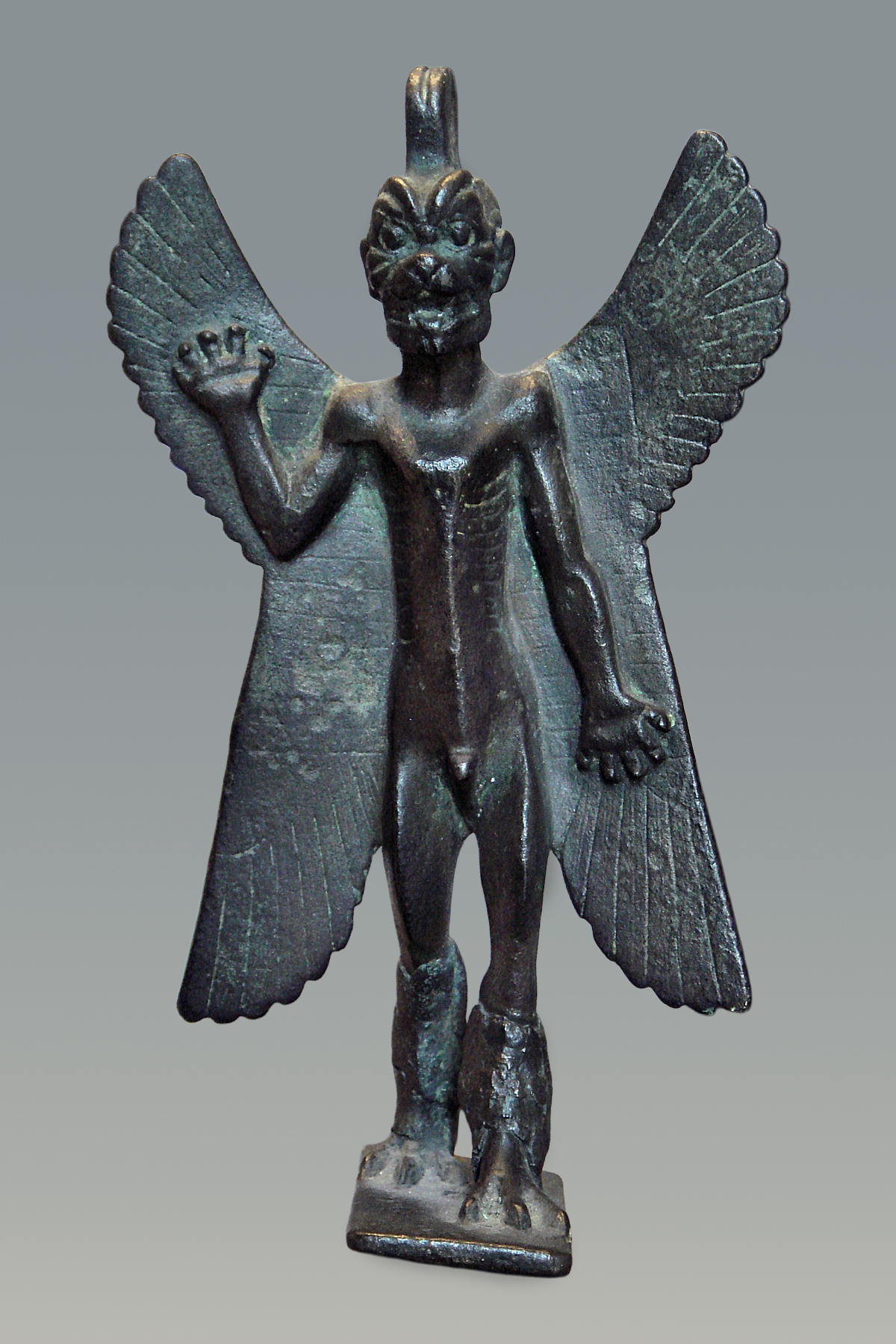
Bronze statue of the Assyro-Babylonian demon king Pazuzu, c. 800–700 BCE, Louvre

A demon is an evil or malevolent supernatural entity. Historically, belief in demons, or stories about demons, occurs in folklore, mythology, religion, occultism, and literature; these beliefs are reflected in media including fiction, comics, film, television, and video games. Belief in demons probably goes back to the Paleolithic age, stemming from humanity's fear of the unknown, the strange and the horrific. In ancient Near Eastern religions and in the Abrahamic religions, including early Judaism and ancient-medieval Christian demonology, a demon is considered a harmful spiritual entity that may cause demonic possession, calling for an exorcism. Large portions of Jewish demonology, a key influence on Christianity and Islam, originated from a later form of Zoroastrianism, and was transferred to Judaism during the Persian era.

Demons may or may not be considered to be devils: minions of the Devil. In many traditions, demons are independent operators, with different demons causing different types of evils (destructive natural phenomena, specific diseases, etc.) in general, while devils appear more often as demons within a theological framework; demons opposing the Divine principle. As lesser spirits doing the Devil's work, they have additional duties—causing humans to have sinful thoughts and tempting humans to commit sinful actions.

The original Ancient Greek word daimōn (δαίμων) did not carry negative connotations, as it denotes a spirit or divine power. The Greek conception of a daimōn notably appears in the philosophical works of Plato, where it describes the divine inspiration of Socrates. In Christianity, morally ambivalent daimōn were replaced by demons, forces of evil only striving for corruption. Such demons are not the Greek intermediary spirits, but hostile entities, already known in Iranian beliefs. In Western esotericism and Renaissance magic, which grew out of an amalgamation of Greco-Roman magic, Jewish Aggadah, and Christian demonology, a demon is believed to be a spiritual entity that may be conjured and controlled.

Belief in demons remains an important part of many modern religions and occult traditions. Demons are still feared largely due to their alleged power to possess living creatures. Within a psychological context demons may be used as metaphors for inner psychological processes ("inner demons").

== Etymology ==
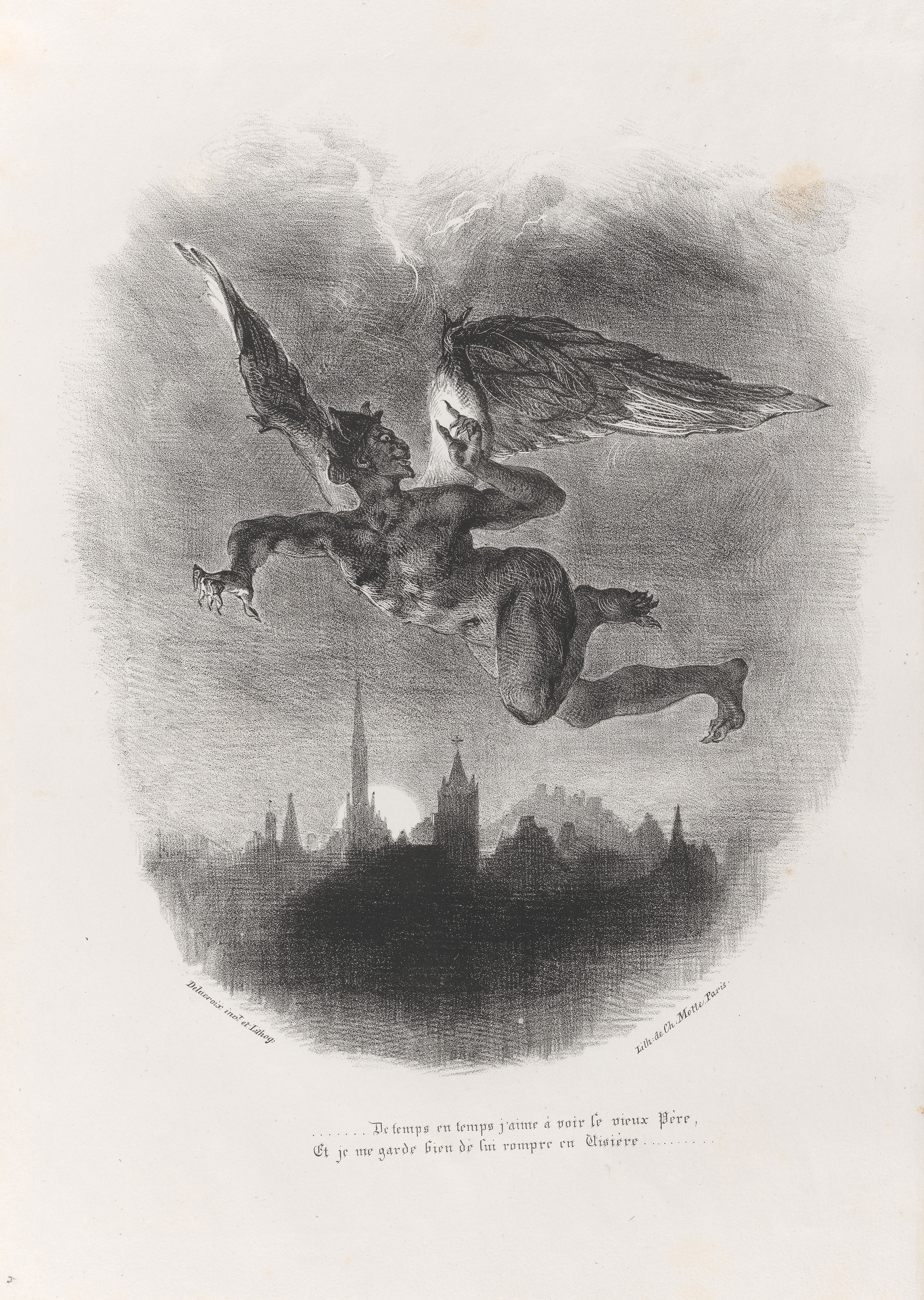
Mephistopheles (a medieval demon from German folklore) flying over Wittenberg, in a lithograph by Eugène Delacroix.

The Ancient Greek word δαίμων (daimōn) denotes a spirit or divine power, much like the Latin genius or numen. Daimōn most likely came from the Greek verb daiesthai ('to divide' or 'distribute'). The Greek conception of a daimōn notably appears in the philosophical works of Plato, where it describes the divine inspiration of Socrates. The original Greek word daimōn does not carry the negative connotation initially understood by implementation of the Koine δαιμόνιον (daimonion), and later ascribed to any cognate words sharing the root.

The Greek terms do not have any connotations of evil or malevolence. By the early centuries of the Roman Empire, cult statues were seen, by Pagans and their Christian neighbors alike, as inhabited by the numinous presence of the Greco-Roman gods: "Like pagans, Christians still sensed and saw the gods and their power, and as something, they had to assume, lay behind it, by an easy traditional shift of opinion they turned these pagan daimones into malevolent 'demons', the trope of Satan. Far into the Byzantine period, Christians eyed their cities' old pagan statuary as a seat of the demons' presence. It was no longer beautiful, it was "infested." The term had first acquired its negative connotations in the Septuagint translation of the Hebrew Bible into Greek, which drew on the mythology of ancient Semitic religions. This was then inherited by the Koine text of the New Testament.

The English use of demon as synonym for devils goes back at least as far as about 825. The German word (Dämon), however, is different from devil (Teufel) and demons as evil spirits, and akin to the original meaning of daimōn. The Western Modern era conception of demons, as in the Ars Goetia, derives seamlessly from the ambient popular culture of Late Antiquity.

== History ==
From an anthropological perspective, demons result from human fear of the unknown. Forces of nature and foreigners may be portrayed as demons if they are perceived as hostile or dangerous; an evil demon might be considered as a projection onto unknown entities which are perceived as potentially dangerous. Thus, unknown causes of death or illness are anthropomorphized into rational agents with evil intentions and then giving rise to the notion of a demon.

Likewise, people outside one's own social group may be blamed for accidents and unexplained causes of harm, leading to a demonization of said people. Then, the imagined cause of said evil is integrated into one's prevailing belief-system. This may also include persons who are considered to be banished from the social group. Transgressions of social norms may result in expulsion from the community and or being killed. From a psychological perspective there is no difference between expulsion and death as both leave a gap in the community. This gap is then filled with a ghost (in case of death) or demon (in case of expulsion), perceived as a disruptive factor in the life of the community.

=== Ancient Egypt ===
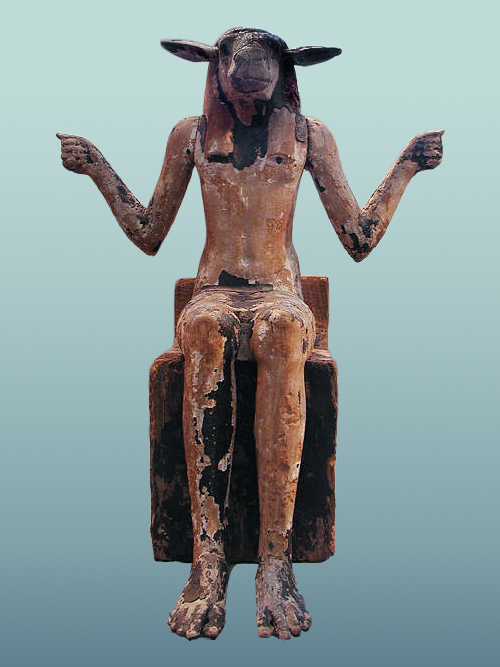
Ram-headed demon. The hands probably outstretch to hold two snakes. From a royal tomb in the Valley of the Kings, Thebes, Egypt. End of the 18th Dynasty, around 1325 BCE

The Ancient Egyptian language lacks a term for the modern English demon, since both deities and lesser spirits can act as intermediaries to deliver messages to humans By that, both share some resemblance to the Greek daimon. However, magical writings indicate that ancient Egyptians acknowledged the existence of malevolent demons by highlighting the demon names with red ink. Demons in this culture appeared to be subordinative and related to a specific deity, yet they may have occasionally acted independently of the divine will. The existence of demons can be related to the realm of chaos, beyond the created world. The role of demons in relation to the human world remains ambivalent and largely depends on context.

Ancient Egyptian demons can be divided into two classes: "guardians" and "wanderers". "Guardians" are tied to a specific place; their demonic activity is topographically defined and their function can be benevolent towards those who have the secret knowledge to face them. Demons protecting the underworld may prevent human souls from entering paradise. Only by knowing the right charms is the deceased able to enter the Halls of Osiris. Here, the aggressive nature of the guardian demons is motivated by the need to protect their abodes and not by their evil essence. Accordingly, demons guarded sacred places or the gates to the netherworld. During the Ptolemaic and Roman period, the guardians shifted towards the role of genius loci and they were the focus of local and private cults.

The "wanderers" are associated with possession, mental illness, death and plagues. Many of them serve as executioners for the major deities, such as Ra or Osiris, when ordered to punish humans on earth or in the netherworld. Wanderers can also be agents of chaos, arising from the world beyond creation to bring about misfortune and suffering without any divine instructions, led only by evil motivations. The influences of the wanderers can be warded off and kept at the borders of the human world by the use of magic, but they can never be destroyed. A sub-category of "wanderers" are nightmare demons, which were believed to cause nightmares by entering a human body.

=== Mesopotamia ===
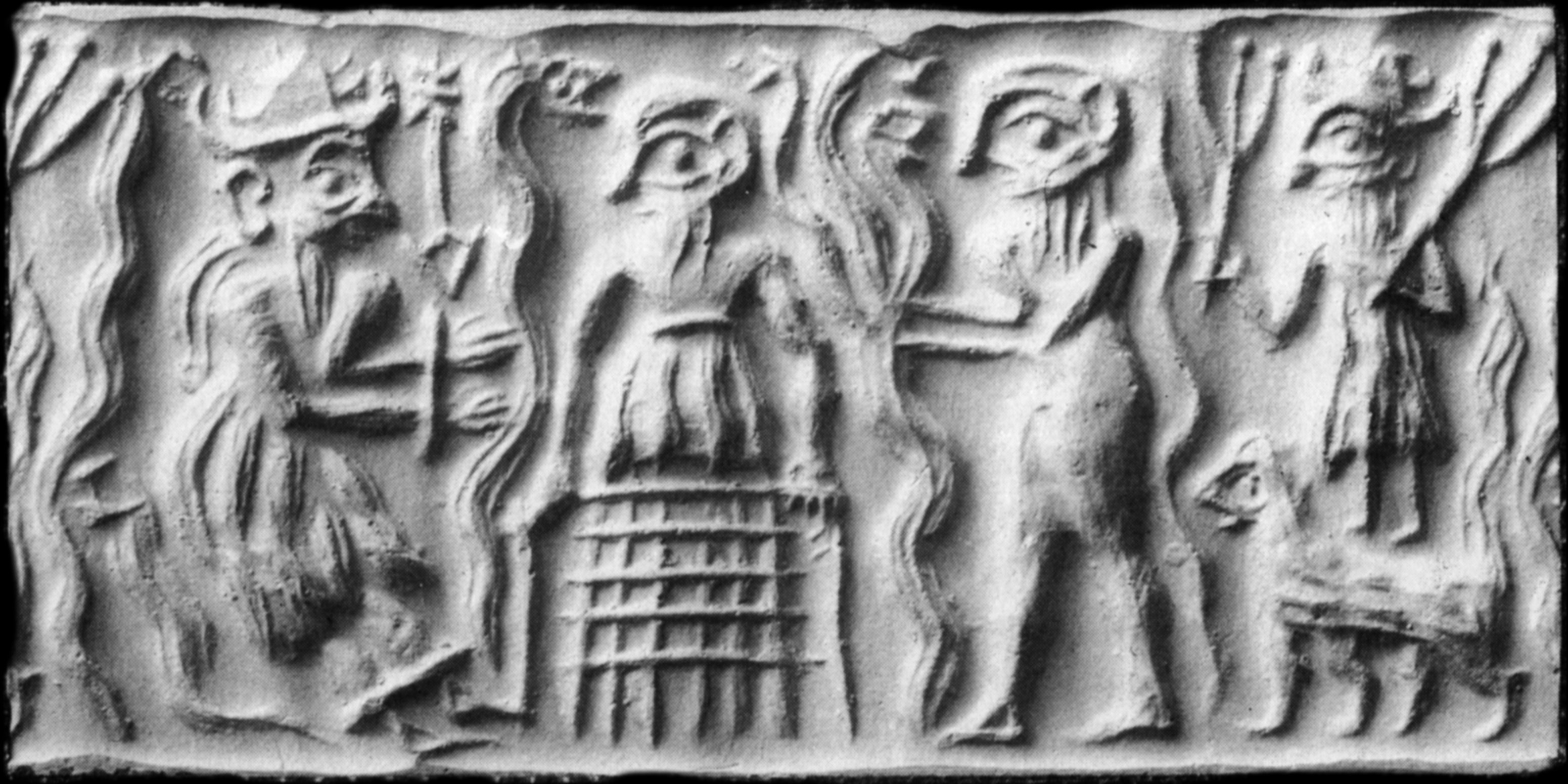
Ancient Sumerian cylinder seal impression showing the god Dumuzid being tortured in the Underworld by galla demons

Mesopotamian demonology had a strong influence on later Hebrew and Christian concepts of demons, with shedu from Chaldean mythology being an example. The demons of Mesopotamia were generally hostile spirits of lesser power than a deity. Since both nature and culture were in constant change, neither were considered part of a divine cosmos. According to the Babylonian creation epic Enūma Eliš, both gods and demons are the children of Tiamat, the goddess of primordial chaos. The demons were engendered by Tiamat as an act of revenge in reaction to the gods slaying her primordial partner Abzu. In the Babylonian tale of the Great Flood, since the gods promised to never flood humanity again, the demoness Lamaštu was installed instead and given the task of killing humans in order to avoid excessive multiplication.

Some demons were the evil spirits of those who died in misery, while other demons were nature demons causing harm by carrying plagues and nightmares, and causing headaches and storms. People could protect themselves from demons by wearing amulets, using magic, or seeking refuge amongst another demon or deity. On an ontological level, in early Semitic history, deities and demons often shed into another, as the distinction was of no importance for the believer.

The underworld was home to many demonic beings, sometimes referred to as the "offspring of arali". These demons ascend from the underworld and terrorize mortals. One class of demons that were believed to reside in the underworld were known as galla; their primary purpose appears to have been to drag unfortunate mortals back to Kur. They are frequently referenced in magical texts, and some texts describe them as being seven in number. Several extant poems describe the galla dragging the god Dumuzid into the underworld. Like many other Mesopotamian demons galla could also fulfill a protective role. In a hymn from King Gudea of Lagash (c. 2144 – 2124 BCE), a minor god named Ig-alima is described as "the great galla of Girsu".

=== Zoroastrianism ===
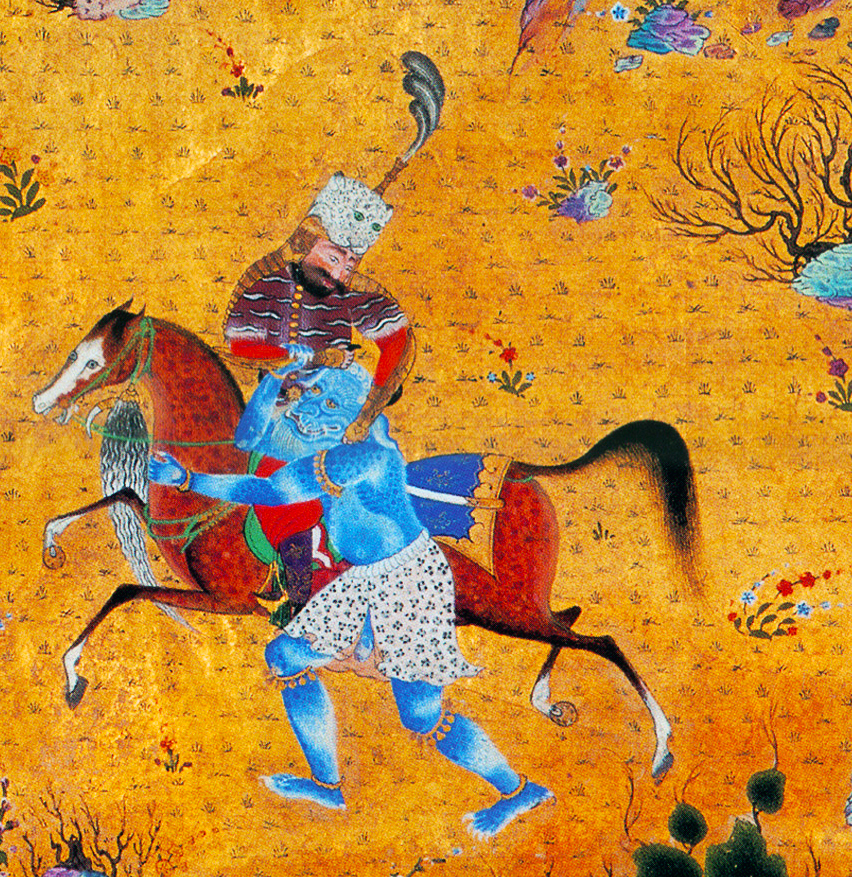
Rostam kills Arzhang Div (The Shahnameh of Shah Tahmasp). The demon is inspired by ancient Persian beliefs.

The Zoroastrian concept of demons (Daeva, later dīv) had strong influence on the Abrahamic religions, especially Christianity and Islam. By elevating Ahura Mazda to the one supreme God, the founder Zoroaster relegated the daevas to demons. Emphasizing free will, Zoroaster taught that demons became evil by their own volition in rejecting truth over falsehood. At a later stage, Mazdaism makes Ahriman, the principle of Evil (i.e. the Devil), the creator of demons and leader of daevas.

The battle between the hosts of deities against evil demons (dīv and druz) are described in the Bundahishn. Humankind lives in a world between the good powers of God (Ahura Mazda) and the Devil (Ahriman) and suffers corruption through defection of humankind. Therefore, Zorastrianism proposes a threefold nature for humans: divine, animalistic, and demonic. As such, humans are obligated to keep fighting the demonic traits. After death, people must cross the Chinvat Bridge to enter paradise. However, those who have chosen evil in their life will fall into the pit of hell. In hell, the damned are tormented by the demons.

In the Younger Avesta, demons (daēuua) cause diseases and death. By abiding to ritual purification and recitation of sacred prayers, demons can be warded off and kept at bay.

=== Apocalyptic period and early Christianity ===
The concept of demons as servants of the Devil entered the Christian tradition via Post-exilic Judaism. Inspired by Zoroastrian dualistic cosmology, the non-Jewish deities were demonized, as evident from intertestamental writings. The apocalyptic literature then builds the foundation for the authors of the Gospels in first-century Judea.

In antiquity, belief in demonic agents of misfortune were widespread. The early Christian community took it for granted that people outside the Judeo-Christian community were worshipping demons. Conversion to Christianity meant renunciation of the demons by the bearers of the Holy Spirit.

By the end of the sixth century, the Mediterranean Christian society widely considered themselves to be unequivocally Christian, with an exception to Jews, the last record of worshipping another pre-Christian deity being in 570s.

=== Medieval Christian Europe ===
Magical rites, charms, and beliefs in spiritual entities were prominent in pre-Christian Europe. While the Church officially declared such beliefs as false, the persistence of such beliefs among the wider populations led Christian monks to assimilate Christian with non-Christian rites. In order to do so, non-Christian symbols and pagan deities have been substituted with Jesus Christ. To sanction the invocation of non-Christian supernatural powers, Christian missionaries, such as John Cassian in the fifth century, declared the pagan gods to be demons, servants of Lucifer, who bring disorder to the world. Many pagan nature spirits like dwarfs and elves thus became seen as demons, servants of the supreme Devil. A difference was made between monsters and demons. The monsters, regarded as distorted humans, probably without souls, were created so that people might be grateful to God that they did not suffer in such a state; they ranked above demons in existence and still claimed a small degree of beauty and goodness as they had not turned away from God.

In Medieval Christianity, demons and spirits were generally considered to be fallen angels. Morally ambivalent nature spirits, such as fairies from Irish and Scandinavian folktales were often explained as angels who remained neutral during the war of heaven. They became spirits of the place they fell into when banished to earth. Although considered neutral spirits earlier, later Protestant thinkers increasingly associated them with Satan and considered them to be demons.

=== Islamic culture in the Middle Ages ===
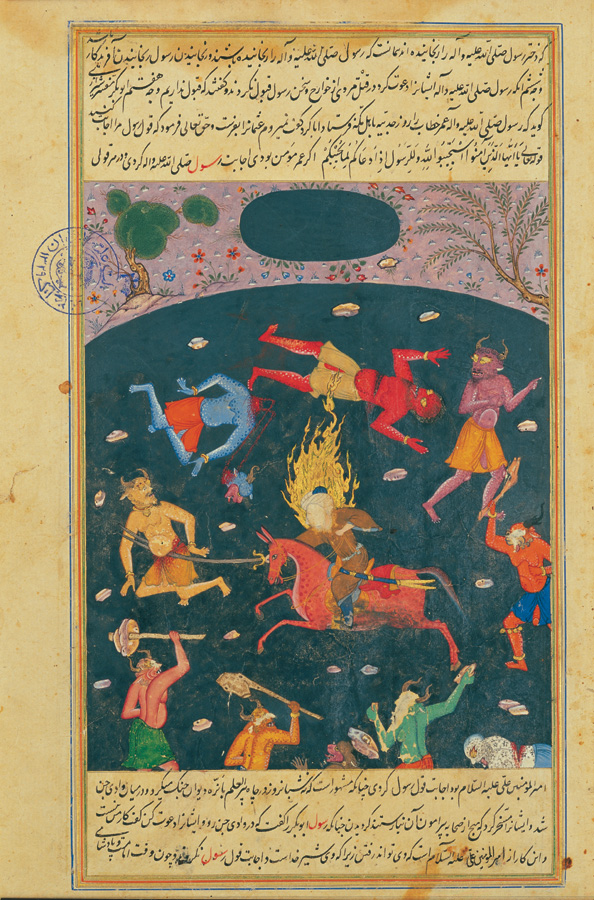
Ali slaying demons with his sword Zulfiqar in a Persian manuscript. As evident from the poetry of Sanā'ī Ghaznavī, the sword is believed to be made from fire (آتش), able to kill not only a body but also a soul.

In Islamic culture, demons (dīv) share many anthropomorphic attributes with the Arabian jinn. Like the jinn from Islamic traditions, they can enter sexual relationships with humans and sire offspring. Nonetheless, demons differ from jinn as they are perceived as malign creatures. Within context of the Islamic belief system, demons are considered to be yet another creature of God, rather than independent parts of the world, as evident from Abu Ali Bal'ami's interpretation of Tarikh al-Tabari and the Süleymanname (written at the time of Suleiman the Magnificent).

The idea of demons is not limited to Islam alone, but appear in various belief-systems along the Silk Road. An Uighur Manichaean text fragment, narrates a story about a prince and three demons. The demons quarrel over three magical items: a cap which turns people invisible, sandals which can bring people to any place they wish, and staff which belongs to the sandals. The demons request the prince to distribute the magical items among the demons. Therefore, he shoots three arrows into three different directions and claims that the demon who brings back an arrow first will receive the cap, the second one the staff, and the third will receive the sandals. Once the demons start chasing the arrows, the prince puts on the cap on his head and vanishes with the power of the sandals and the staff.

Dīv also appear in Manichaeistic writings as the original inhabitants of the world of darkness. Before the demons attacked the realm of light, they have been in constant battle and sexual intercourse against each other. It is only in the realm of darkness demons are described in their physical form. After their assault on the world above, they have been overcome by the Living Spirit, and imprisoned in the structure of the world. From that point onwards, they impact human's ethical life, and appear as personified ethical qualities, mostly greed, envy, grief, and wrath (desire for destruction). Ibn al-Jawzi, describes these demons (ʿafārīt), in his Talbīs Iblīs ('devils' delusion'), as components of the Devil (or Darkness) waging war against God (or Light), composed of angels. Such demons also frequently appear throughout Islamic literature as personification of human vices. The protagonist of these stories must overcome the demons, as a symbol for their own animalistic nature, in order to heed his rational inclination and achieve salvation in paradisical bliss.

Demons are believed to be vanquished by sacred symbols. The content of the symbol depends on the prevailing religion of the culture. Among Turks, the basmalah ("invocation of the name of Allah") is used to ward off demons, while among Armenians, the symbol of the cross is utilized. Common features of these Middle Eastern demons are their immortality and pernicious nature, they can turn invisible, and can be enslaved when pierced by a silver needle. Demons are believed to be mostly active at night and a bad smell in the air or sudden change in temperature would announce their presence. It is generally accepted that demons can be subjugated as they are said to be enslaved by legendary heroes (Solomon in the Quran and Jamshid in Persian legends). Due to their reluctant nature, even enslaved, they do always the opposite of what has been commanded. In some tales, supernatural powers are attributed to them, such as causing sickness, mental illnesses, or even turn humans to stone.

=== European occultism and Renaissance magic ===
Under influence of Islamic philosophy, Medieval occult traditions and Renaissance magic, European Renaissance demons are often seen as beneficial and useful, lacking an inherent negative connotation. In fifteenth- and sixteenth-century Renaissance magic, the terms demon and devil have two different, although not exclusive, meanings. The term demons refers to a cluster of supernatural beings, such as daimons, spirits, and devils, affecting the mind. While some people fear demons, or attempt to exorcise them, others willfully attempt to summon them for knowledge, assistance, or power. William of Conches (c. 1090/1091 – c. 1155/1170s) understands demon closer to the Greek daimōn, reserving the concept of the devil only for the "demons of the lower regions":

You think, as I infer from your words, that a demon is the same as a devil, which is not the case. For a demon is said to be any invisible being using reason, as if knowing. Of these the two high orders are called calodemons, that is, 'good knowing ones', the lower order is called cacodemon, that is, 'evil knowing one', for calos means 'good', cacos 'bad'.

In the sixteenth century, among proponents of demons as ambivalent spirits, Paracelsus was the most vocal. He asserted that these beings are spirit-like and thus not human, but they have bodies and flesh and are thus, not angels. Robert Kirk (1644–1692) integrated fairies into his theories of intermediary spirits. He suggested that these beings are structured similar to human societies, intelligent beings who eat and drink yet invisible to most humans. Their views were rejected by demonologists and religious orthodoxy and labelled as "atheistic". They denied that spirits could have an autonomeous existence and that they are demons with the sole purpose of deceiving and harming people.

A variety of spirits or the assumption that demons might be morally ambivalent is encouraged by necromancy. Here, a necromancer supposedly converses with the spirits of the dead. A ceremonial magician usually consults a grimoire, which gives the names and abilities of demons as well as detailed instructions for conjuring and controlling them. Grimoires are not limited to demons – some give instructions for the invocation of deity, a process called theurgy. The use of ceremonial magic to call demons is also known as goetia, a word derived from the Greek word goes, which originally denoted diviners, magicians, healers, and seers.

=== Age of Enlightenment ===
In the 16th to early 17th centuries, the idea – inherited from Renaissance magic and occultism – that demonic forces could be conjured and controlled may have paved the way for the development of modern sciences. In Hermetic- and Kabbalist philosophy, demons could be subjugated. This shaped the idea that humans can control their social environment and their surrounding natural forces.

The Age of Enlightenment conceptualizes humans as autonomous individuals, mostly independent from external invisible forces, such as demons or gods ruling over human fate. While in the pre-modern period, spirits and demons were assigned to various natural phenomena, the rationalistic school of thought, increasingly rejected the attribution of demons to unknown causes.

The rejection of demons as a form of superstition was also welcomed by religious perspective, considered to be a "removal" of remaining pagan beliefs. According to Wouter Hanegraaff, demons are pagan beliefs, removed by the Age of Enlightenment.

Many considered demons to be non-existent and alleged visions of demons and ghosts were explained as results of superstition. By that local religious customs were also oppressed in favor of nationwide (religious) ideas or deities. Wilkinson Duran states that people who believe in demons are often marginalized in the United States.

The rejection of demons as the cause of natural events also contributed to the association of demons with delusions and merely mental phenomena. For example, the notion that demons could possess an individual, stripped the individual away from their personhood and was at odds with modern Western philosophy. The most prominent ones, such as the American Dream and capitalism, imply the belief that everyone is responsible for their own fate and not at the mercy of external forces, thus has no room left for demons or demonic possessions. The concept of demons has nevertheless not disappeared from the public, permeating media, arts, and psychology.

== Judaism ==
There are differing opinions in Judaism about the existence or non-existence of demons (shedim or se'irim). Some Rabbinic scholars assert that demons have existed in Talmudic times, but do not exist regularly in present. When prophecy, divine presence, and divine inspiration gradually decreased, the demonic powers of impurity have become correspondingly weak, too.

=== Hebrew Bible ===
The Hebrew Bible mentions two classes of demonic spirits, the se'irim and the shedim. The word shedim (singular shed or sheyd) appears in two places in the Hebrew Bible. The se'irim (singular sa'ir, 'male goat') are mentioned once in Leviticus 17:7, probably a recollection of Assyrian demons in the shape of goats. They might be a metaphorical symbol for life-threatening animals, such as hyenas, ostrichs, and jackals. The shedim, however, are not pagan demigods or demons per se, but the foreign gods themselves. They are evil insofar that they are not affiliated with the Jewish deity. These entities appear in a scriptural context of animal or child sacrifice to non-existent false gods.

Various diseases and ailments were ascribed to demons, particularly those affecting the brain and those of internal nature. Examples include catalepsy, headache, epilepsy and nightmares. There also existed a demon of blindness, Shabriri (lit. 'dazzling glare'), who rested on uncovered water at night and blinded those who drank from it.

Demons supposedly entered the body and caused the disease while overwhelming or "seizing" the victim. To cure such diseases, it was necessary to draw out the evil demons by certain incantations and talismanic performances, at which the Essenes excelled. Josephus, who spoke of demons as "spirits of the wicked which enter into men that are alive and kill them", but which could be driven out by a certain root, witnessed such a performance in the presence of the Emperor Vespasian and ascribed its origin to King Solomon. In mythology, there were few defences against Babylonian demons. The mythical mace Sharur had the power to slay demons such as Asag, a legendary gallu or edimmu of hideous strength.

=== Talmudic tradition and Midrashim ===
In the Jerusalem Talmud, notions of shedim ('demons' or 'spirits') are almost unknown or occur only very rarely, whereas in the Babylonian Talmud there are many references to shedim and magical incantations. The existence of shedim in general was not questioned by most of the Babylonian Talmudists. As a consequence of the rise of influence of the Babylonian Talmud over that of the Jerusalem Talmud, late rabbis, in general, took as fact the existence of shedim, nor did most of the medieval thinkers question their reality. However, rationalists like Maimonides and Saadia Gaon and others explicitly denied their existence, and completely rejected concepts of demons, evil spirits, negative spiritual influences, attaching and possessing spirits. They thought the essential teaching about shedim and similar spirits is, that they should not be an object of worship, not a reality to be acknowledged or feared. Their point of view eventually became mainstream Jewish understanding.

The opinion of some authors is not clear. Abraham ibn Ezra states that insane people can see the image of se'irim, when they go astray and ascribe to them powers independent from God. It is not clear from his work, if he considered these images of se'irim as manifestations of actual spirits or merely delusions. Despite academic consensus, Rabbis disputed that Maimonides denied the existence of demons entirely. He would only dispute the existence of demons in his own life time, but not that demons had existed once. Ibn Zarza likewise argues that demons (se'irim) are a manifestation of insanity. He asserts that a weak intellect could not discern reality from imagination and hence errorneously believes in the reality of demons and satans.

Occasionally an angel is called satan in the Babylon Talmud. But satans do not refer to demons as they remain at the service of God: "Stand not in the way of an ox when coming from the pasture, for Satan dances between his horns". Ibn Zarza, however, argues that satan belongs to the demons (se'irim):

Demons are called goats, as it says, "And they shall no more offer their sacrifices to the se'irim" [satyrs] (Leviticus 17:7), since they saw fit to compare demons to them more than to other animals. The nature of the goat is to cause blight and vast damage, so great that they called the goat the angel of death, and the angel of death is Satan, as it is said "Reksh Lakish said: Satan, the angel of death, and the evil instinct are all one," hence it is proper to call them se'irim."

Aggadic tales from the Persian tradition describe the shedim, the mazziḳim ("harmers"), and the ruḥin ("spirits"). There were also lilin ("night spirits"), ṭelane ("shade", or "evening spirits"), ṭiharire ("midday spirits"), and ẓafrire ("morning spirits"), as well as the "demons that bring famine" and "such as cause storm and earthquake". According to some aggadic stories, demons were under the dominion of a king or chief, usually Asmodai.

=== Kabbalah ===
In Kabbalah, demons are regarded as a necessary part of the divine emanation in the material world and a byproduct of human sin (Qlippoth). After they are created, they assume an existence on their own. Demons would attach themselves to the sinner and start to multiply as an act of self-preservation. Medieval Kabbalists characterize such demons as punishing angels of destruction. They are subject to the divine will, and do not act independently.

Other demonic entities, such as the shedim, might be considered benevolent. The Zohar classifies them as those who are like humans and submit to the Torah, and those who have no fear of God and are like animals.

=== Second Temple Judaism ===
The sources of demonic influence were thought to originate from the Watchers or Nephilim, who are first mentioned in Genesis 6 and are the focus of 1 Enoch Chapters 1–16, and also in Jubilees 10. The Nephilim were seen as the source of the sin and evil on Earth because they are referenced in Genesis 6:4 before the story of the Flood. In Genesis 6:5, God sees evil in the hearts of men. Ethiopic Enoch refers to Genesis 6:4–5, and provides further description of the story connecting the Nephilim to the corruption of humans. According to the Book of Enoch, sin originates when angels descend from heaven and fornicate with women, birthing giants. The Book of Enoch shows that these fallen angels can lead humans to sin through direct interaction or through providing forbidden knowledge. Most scholars understand the text to mean that demons originate from the evil spirits of the deceased giants, cursed by God to wander the Earth. Dale Martin disagrees with this interpretation, arguing that the ghosts of the Nephilim are distinct. The evil spirits would make the people sacrifice to the demons, but they were not demons themselves. The spirits are stated in Enoch to "corrupt, fall, be excited, and fall upon the earth, and cause sorrow".

== Christianity ==
Christianity conceptualizes demons as occasionally visible, evil beings sowing destruction in the world and disguising themselves as pagan gods. According to Christian theology, demons are fallen angels. They are believed to have been created as good angels who then turned evil by joining Lucifer in his rebellion against God. This is not shared by Judaism. The theology of fallen angels is a result of interpretation of different Biblical passages (See Revelation chapter 12, Jude 9) in the second and third century. Augustine of Hippo (5th century) established the position, that demons are spirits (angels) who turn away from God, for Western demonology and for the Catholic Church.

=== Old Testament ===
The existence of demons as inherently malicious spirits within Old Testamental texts is absent. Though there are evil spirits sent by YHWH, they can hardly be called demons, since they serve and do not oppose the governing deity. First then the Hebrew Bible was translated into Greek, the "gods of other nations" were merged into a single category of demons (daimones) with implied negativity.

The Greek Daimons were associated with demi-divine entities, deities, illnesses and fortune-telling. The Jewish translators rendered them all as demons, depicting their power as nullified comparable to the description of shedim in the Tanakh. Although all these supernatural powers were translated, none were angels, despite sharing a similar function to that of the Greek Daimon. This established a dualism between the angels on God's side and negatively evaluated demons of pagan origin. Their relationship to the God-head became the main difference between angels and demons, not their degree of benevolence. Both angels and demons might be fierce and terrifying. However, the angels act always at service of the high god of the Israelites, differing from the pagan demons, who represent the powers of foreign deities. The Septuagint refers to evil spirits as demons (daimon).

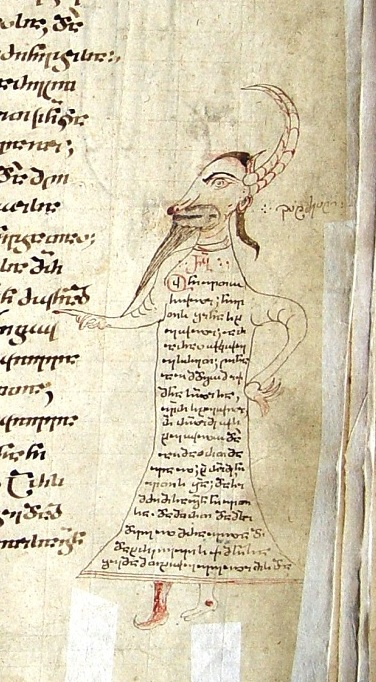
A demon from The Ladder of Divine Ascent, written in Georgian by Nikrai.

Demons are included in biblical interpretation. In the story of Passover, the Bible tells the story as "the Lord struck down all the firstborn in Egypt" (Exodus 12:21–29). In the Book of Jubilees, which is considered canonical in the Ethiopian Orthodox Church, this same event is told slightly differently: "All the powers of [the demon] Mastema had been let loose to slay all the first-born in the land of Egypt. And the powers of the Lord did everything according as the Lord commanded them." (Jubilees 49:2–4)

In the Genesis flood narrative, the author explains how God was noticing "how corrupt the earth had become, for all the people on earth had corrupted their ways" (Genesis 6:12). In Jubilees, the sins of man are attributed to "the unclean demons [who] began to lead astray the children of the sons of Noah, and to make to err and destroy them" (Jubilees 10:1). In Jubilees, Mastema questions the loyalty of Abraham and tells God to "bid him offer him as a burnt offering on the altar, and Thou wilt see if he will do this command" (Jubilees 17:16). The discrepancy between the story in Jubilees and the story in Genesis 22 exists with the presence of Mastema. In Genesis, God tests the will of Abraham merely to determine whether he is a true follower, however; in Jubilees, Mastema has an agenda behind promoting the sacrifice of Abraham's son, "an even more demonic act than that of Satan in Job". In Jubilees, where Mastema, an angel tasked with tempting mortals into sin and iniquity, requests that God give him a tenth of the spirits of the children of the watchers, demons, in order to aid the process (Jubilees 10:7–9). These demons are passed into Mastema's authority, where once again, an angel is in charge of demonic spirits.

In the Testament of Solomon, which is not included in Jewish or Christian canons, written sometime in the first three centuries C.E., the demon Asmodeus explains that he is the son of an angel and a human mother. Another demon describes himself as having died in the "massacre in the age of giants". Beelzebub, one of the princes of demons, appears as a fallen angel, not as a demon, but makes people worship demons as their gods.

=== New Testament ===
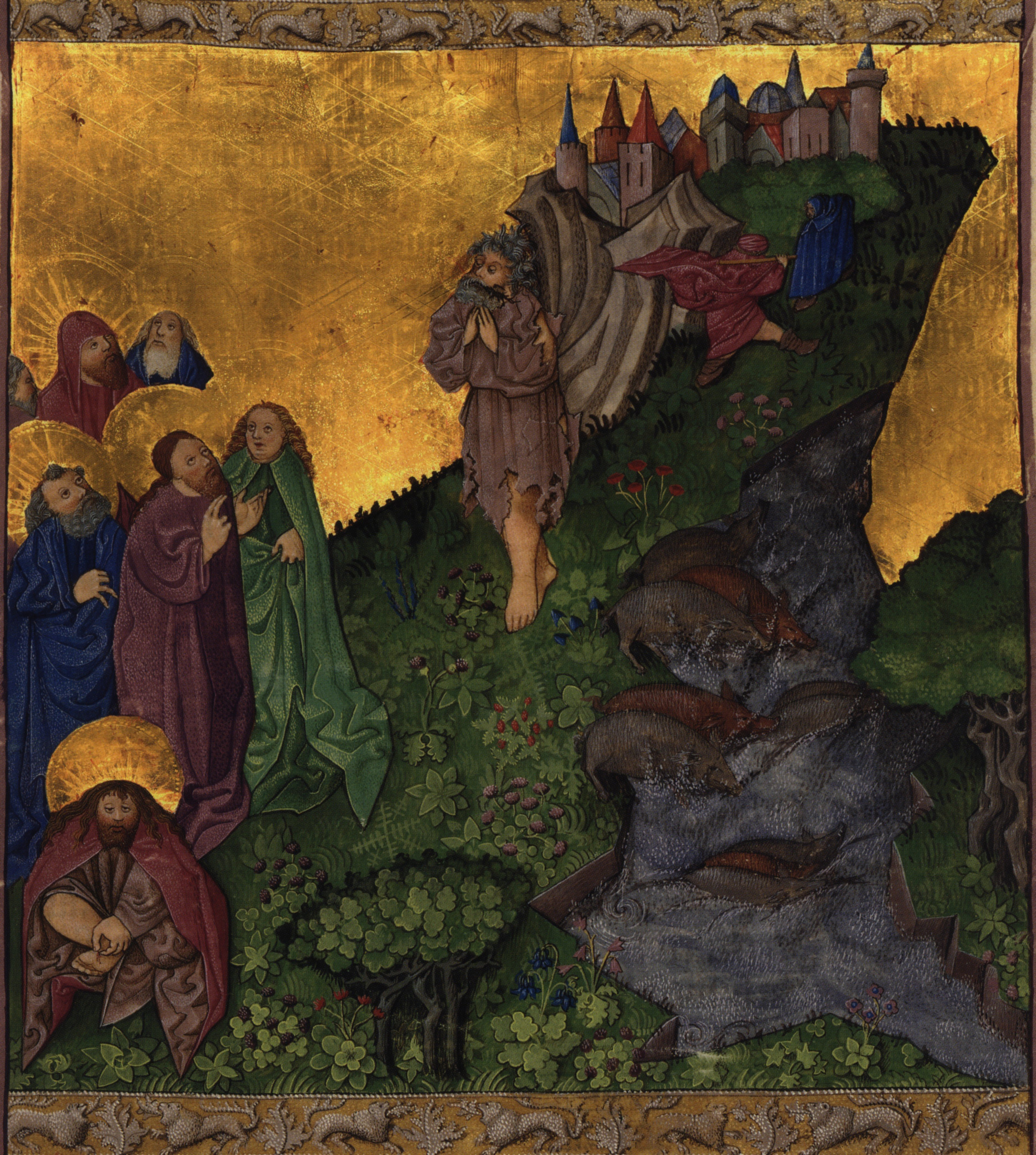
Medieval illumination from the Ottheinrich Folio depicting the exorcism of the Gerasene demoniac by Jesus

Through the New Testament, demons appear 55 times, and 46 times in reference to demonic possession or exorcisms. Some old English Bible translations such as King James Version do not have the word demon in their vocabulary and translate it as 'devil'. As adversaries of Jesus, demons are not morally ambivalent spirits, but evil; causes of misery, suffering, and death. They are not tempters, but the cause of pain, suffering, and maladies, both physical and mental. Temptation is reserved for the devil only. Unlike spirits in pagan beliefs, demons are not intermediary spirits who must be sacrificed for the appeasement of a deity. Possession also shows no trace of positivity, contrary to some pagan depictions of spirit possession. They are explicitly said to be ruled by the Devil or Beelzebub. Their origin is unclear, the texts take the existence of demons for granted. Many early Christians, like Irenaeus, Justin Martyr, Clement of Alexandria, and Lactantius assumed demons were ghosts of the Nephilim, known from Intertestamental writings. Because of references to Satan as the lord of demons and evil angels of Satan throughout the New Testament, other scholars identified fallen angels with demons. Demons as entirely evil entities, who have been born evil, may not fit the proposed origin of evil in free will, taught in alternate or opposing theologies.

=== Christian demonology ===
The Torment of Saint Anthony (1488) by Michelangelo, depicting Saint Anthony being assailed by demons

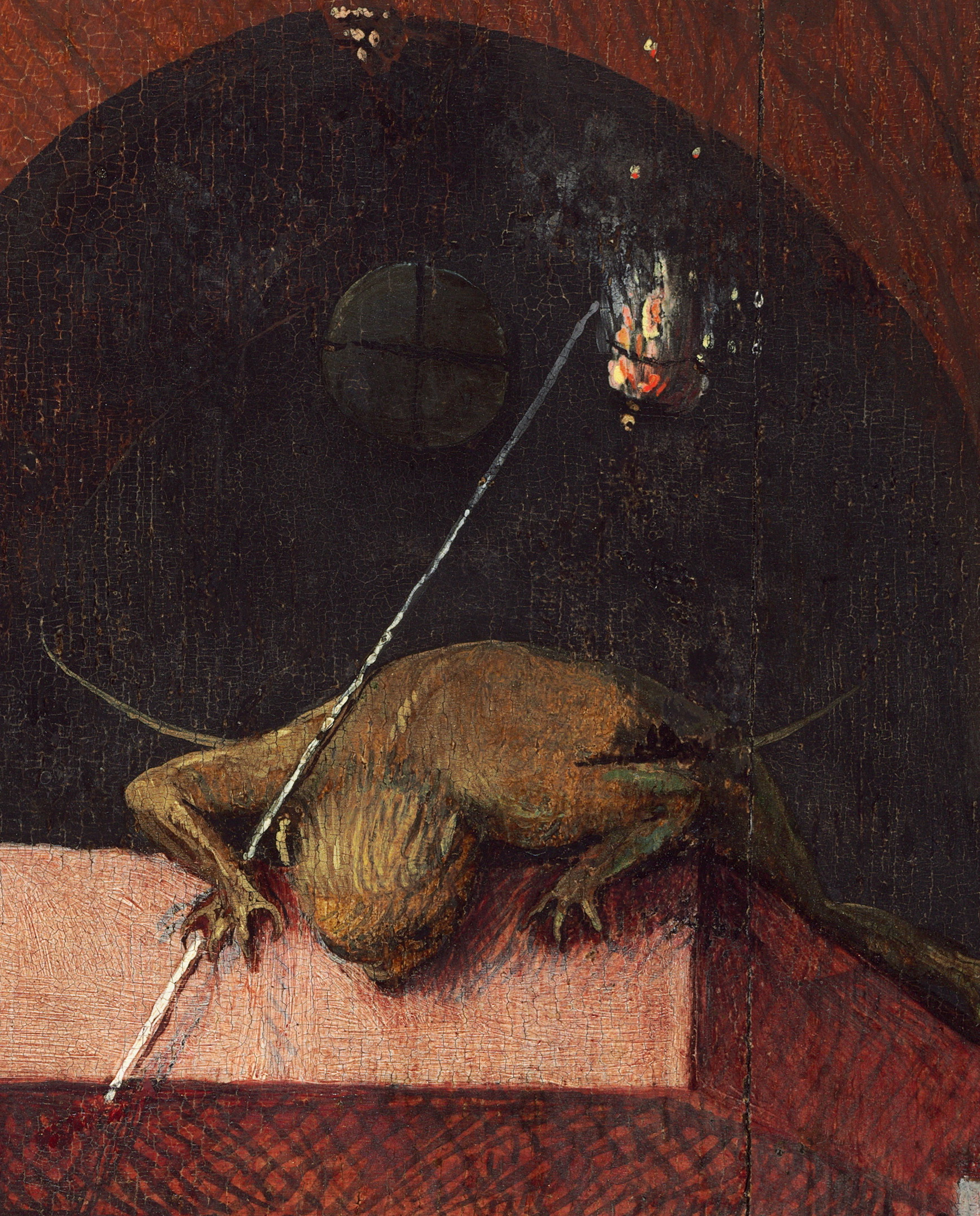
Death and the Miser (detail), a Hieronymus Bosch painting, National Gallery of Art, Washington, D.C.

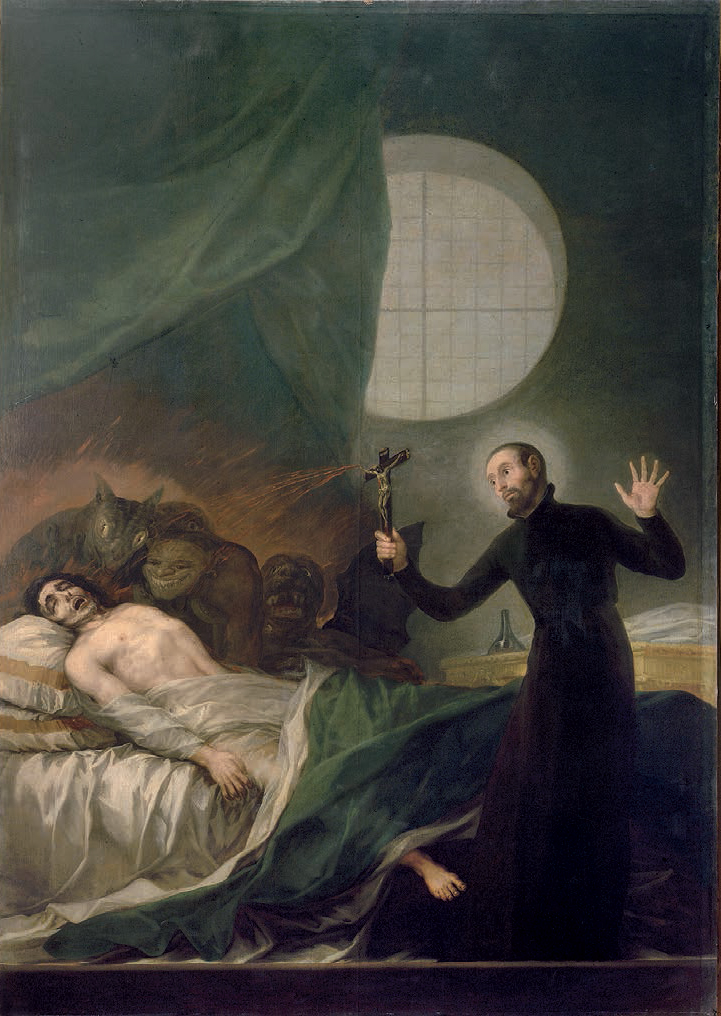
Painting of Saint Francis Borgia performing an exorcism, as depicted by Goya

Since Early Christianity, demonology has developed from a simple acceptance of demons to a complex study that has grown from the original ideas taken from Jewish demonology and Christian scriptures. Christian demonology is studied in depth within the Catholic Church, and many other Christian churches affirm and discuss the existence of demons.

Building upon the references to daimon in the New Testament, especially in the Book of Revelation, Christian writers of apocrypha from the second century onwards created a more complicated tapestry of beliefs about "demons" that was largely independent of Christian scripture.

While daimons were considered as both potentially benevolent or malevolent, Origen argued against Celsus that daimons are exclusively evil entities, supporting the later idea of (evil) demons. According to Origen's cosmology, increasing corruption and evil within the soul, the more estranged the soul gets from God. Therefore, Origen opined that the most evil demons are located underground. Besides the fallen angels known from Christian scriptures, Origen talks about Greek daemons, like nature spirits and giants. These creatures were thought to inhabit nature or air and nourish from pagan sacrifices roaming the earth. However, there is no functional difference between the spirits of the underworld and of earth, since both have fallen from perfection into the material world. Origen sums them up as fallen angels and thus equal to demons.

Many ascetics, like Origen and Anthony the Great, described demons as psychological powers, tempting to evil, in contrast to benevolent angels advising good. According to Life of Anthony, written in Greek around 360 by Athanasius of Alexandria, most of the time, the demons were expressed as an internal struggle, inclinations, and temptations. But after Anthony successfully resisted the demons, they would appear in human form to tempt and threaten him even more intensely.

Pseudo-Dionysius the Areopagite described evil as "defiancy" and does not give evil an ontological existence. He explains demons are deficient creatures, who willingly turn themselves towards the unreal and non-existence. Their dangerous nature results not from the power of their nature, but from their tendency to drag others into the "void" and the unreal, away from God.

Michael Psellos proposed the existence of several types of demons, deeply influenced by the material nature of the regions they dwell. The highest and most powerful demons attack the mind of people using their "imaginative action" (phantastikos) to produce illusions in the mind. The lowest demons, on the other hand, are almost mindless, gross, and grunting spirits, which try to possess people instinctively, simply attracted by the warmth and life of humans. These cause diseases, fatal accidents and animalistic behavior in their victims. They are unable to speak, while other lower types of demons might give out false oracles. The demons are divided into:

- Leliouria: The highest demons who inhabit the ether, beyond the moon
- Aeria: Demons of the air below the moon
- Chthonia: Inhabiting the land
- Hyraia/Enalia: Dwelling in the water
- Bypochtbonia: They live beneath the earth
- Misophaes: The lowest type of demon, blind and almost senseless in the lowest hell

Invocation of Saints, holy men and women, especially ascetics, reading the Gospel, holy oil or water is said to drive them out. However, Psellos' schemes have been too inconsistent to answer questions about the hierarchy of fallen angels. The devil's position is impossible to assign in this scheme and it does not respond to living perceptions of felt experience and was considered rather impractical to have a lasting effect or impact on Christian demonology.

The contemporary Catholic Church unequivocally teaches that angels and demons are real beings rather than just symbolic devices. The Catholic Church has officially-sanctioned exorcists which perform many exorcisms each year. The exorcists of the Catholic Church teach that demons attack humans continually but that afflicted persons can be effectively healed and protected either by the formal rite of exorcism, authorized to be performed only by bishops and those they designate, or by prayers of deliverance, which any Christian can offer for themselves or others.

At various times in Christian history, attempts have been made to classify demons according to various proposed demonic hierarchies.

In recent times, some scholars doubted that independent demons exist, and rather considers them, aking to Jewish satan, to be servants of God. According to S. N. Chiu, God is shown sending a demon against Saul in 1 Samuel 16 and 18 in order to punish him for the failure to follow God's instructions, showing God as having the power to use demons for his own purposes, putting the demon under his divine authority. According to the Britannica Concise Encyclopedia, demons, despite being typically associated with evil, are often shown to be under divine control, and not acting of their own devices.

== Islam ==
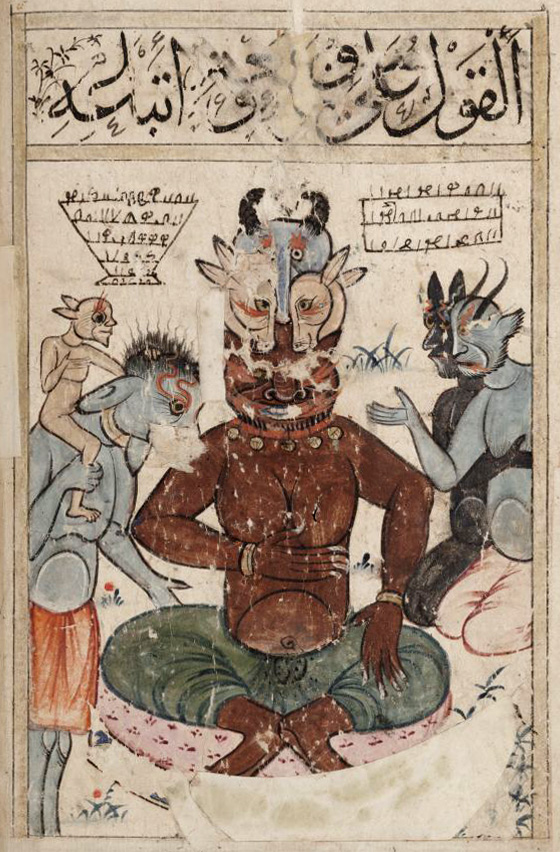
Zawba'a or Zoba'ah, the demon-king of Friday depicted in the Book of Wonders.

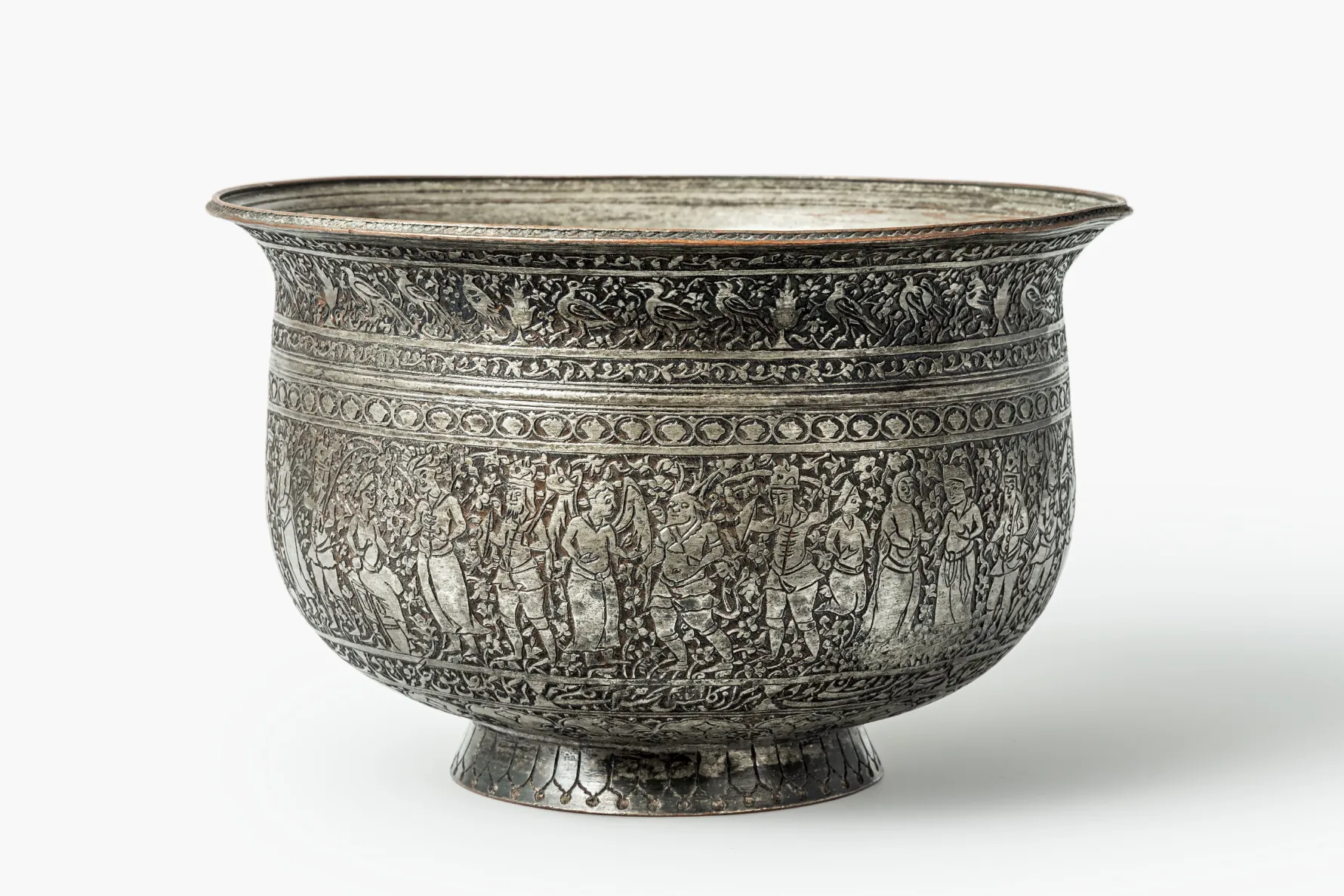
Bowl with humans, angels, and divs (demons). Iran Qajar dynasty, 1215-1221 A.H. (1800-1805). Museum für Kunst und Gewerbe Hamburg, Germany. This bowl depicts humans, angels, and horned creatures called divs - demons of ancient Iranian origin. Divs embody evil, disrupt order and represent vices such as pride and anger. They still appear in literature and art today as symbols of chaos and inner conflict.

In Islamic beliefs, demons are roughly of two types: Jinn and devils (Arabic: شَيَاطِين, romanized: šayāṭīn or Persian: دیو, romanized: dīv). The jinn derive from pre-Islamic Arabian beliefs, although their exact origin is unclear. The presence of jinn in pre-Islamic Arabian beliefs is not only testified by the Quran, but also by pre-Islamic literature in the seventh century. The šayāṭīn (devils or satans) on the other hand, appear in stories bearing similarities with Judeo-Christian or Persian tradition.

According to Islam, all beings, including humans, jinn, and fiends (dīv) are created and thus rewarded or punished by God. The latter category are closer to the Christian understanding of demons as inherently evil beings. However, if they use their evil nature in accordance to God's will, such as punishing the transgessors among humans and jinn, they also might be considered Muslim and ultimately be rewarded.

Although often used synonymously, some Muslim scholars additionally distinguish between two types of devils; satans and fiends. According to Al-Ghazali's The Alchemy of Happiness, the satans abide in barzakh, where human mental processing is happening, while the fiends operate on the sensual realm. As such, satans and fiends form a symbiosis; whereas the fiends encourage sensual desires, the satans to diverge the mind, whenever it attempts to reach the heavenly planes, back to the earth in the grasp of demons. The satans do so, following their father Iblis (Satan), out of disdain for Adam, while it is the nature of the fiends to encourage sensual temptation.

Muslim exegetical literature as well as Muslim poetry dedicated lengthy stories and allegeories in order to explain the interplay between fiends, satans, and human sin. The prophet Solomon, who according to the Qur'an, lost his kingdom to a fiend known as Sakhr. The writings of al-Farabi had lasting influence on Islamic thought, identifying the concept of a kingdom with the human body. The fiend taking over Solomon's kingdom was thus seen as a fiend seizing control of Solomon himself. Each individual human being is in danger to lose their self-control to such demonic beings. Muslim poetry is likewise influenced by the philosophical thought of the Islamic Golden Age. While for philosophers, such as al-Farabi and Avicenna, the material world is described only in technical terms, Sanai explicitly identifies sensual passion with the fiends from Muslim literature.

Besides fiends causing some sort of demonic possession through passion, both folklore and orthodox Islam generally assumes that creatures with foreign bodies, known as jinn, can possess a person and cause sickness. In the tradition of Ash'ari, it has been considered to be part of the doctrines (aqidah) of the "people of the Sunnah" (ahl as-sunnah wal-jammah'a). For most theologians, (Ashʿaris as well as Muʿtazilis), and in contrast to philosophers, both demons (jinn and devils) and angels are considered to be material. All sentient beings are said to be created out from a physical substance: angels from light, jinn from fire and air, devils from fire, and humans from earth.

The Quran emphasizes similarities between humans and jinn. The Quranic phrase al-ins wa al-jinn (الإِنسِ وَالْجِنِّ) puts the jinn to the same position as humans and whereby also rejecting kinship with God. In contrast to demons from the biblical tradition, the jinn are not a source of evil. In the majority of Muslim writings, the jinn are ephemeral and shadowy creatures and primarily linked to magical practices (both white and black magic), though sometimes to disastrous effects.

While the jinn are morally ambivalent, the šayāṭīn represent malevolent forces akin to the devils of the Judeo-Christian tradition, and are actively obstructing the execution of God's will. Because of that, they bear less resemblance to humans than the jinn. The latter share attributes with humans, such as mortality, whereas the šayāṭīn do not. In Muslim culture, the šayāṭīn are used synonymously with Persian term Dīv (دیو).

Muslim writers on astrology identified the planetary spirits known from ancient Greek cosmology, with seven demon-kings, often invoked for the preparation of Magic squares. According to the Book of Wonders each day of the week is assigned to one of the rūḥāiya ulia (higher spirits) and rūḥāiya sufula (lower spirits).

== Dharmic religions ==
=== Hinduism ===
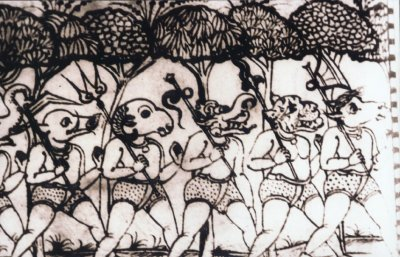
The Army of Super Creatures – from The Saugandhika Parinaya Manuscript (1821 CE)

Hinduism advocates the reincarnation and transmigration of souls according to one's karma. Souls (Atman) of the dead are adjudged by the Yama and are accorded various purging punishments before being reborn. According to Hindu cosmology, nothing is either purely evil or good, and even demonic beings could eventually abandon their demonic nature. Humans that have committed extraordinary wrongs are condemned to roam as lonely, often mischief monsters, spirits for a length of time before being reborn. Many kinds of such spirits (Vetalas and Pishachas) are recognized in the later Hindu texts. Even celestial beings are subject to change.

The identification of asura with demons stems from the description of asura as "formerly gods" (pūrvadeva). The deva Śakra tricked the asuras to drink from liquor and hurled them down to the steps of Mount Meru, claiming heaven solely for the devas.(287)

In the Veda, gods (deva) and demons or titans (asura) are not yet differentiated beings and both share the upper world. Rather than denoting a separate class of being, the asuras are characterized by being great leaders, often warriors. Asura, in the earliest hymns of the Rigveda, originally meant any supernatural spirit, either good or bad. Since the /s/ of the Indic linguistic branch is cognate with the /h/ of the Early Iranian languages, the word asura, representing a category of celestial beings, is a cognate with Old Persian Ahura. Ancient Hinduism tells that Devas (also called suras) and Asuras are half-brothers, sons of the same father Kashyapa; although some of the Devas, such as Varuna, are also called Asuras. Later, during Puranic age, Asura and Rakshasa came to exclusively mean any of a race of anthropomorphic, powerful, possibly evil beings. Daitya (lit. sons of the mother Diti), Danava (lit. sons of the mother "Danu"), Maya Danava, Rakshasa (lit. from "harm to be guarded against"), and asura are sometimes translated into English as 'demon'.

At the time of the Brahmanas that the asuras are said to inhabit the underworld and are progressively, despite originally distinct beings, assimilated to the rakshasas. During the Vedic period, gods aid humans against demons. By that, gods secure their own place in heaven, using humans as tools to defeat their cosmic enemies. The rakshasas are often portrayed as vile creatures associated with greed and magical abilities, unleashed through rites considered inappropriate by the Brahmins. However, the asuras retain some of their previous features, and function often as individual leaders of the rakshasas. The asuras also mostly dwell in the heavenly worlds, while the Earth is plagued by lower demonic beings such as rakshasas, bhutas, pretas, and pishachas. The pretas are ghosts, who could not go to the afterlife yet. The Pishachas, likewise, are spirits of the dead, but associated with eating human-flesh.

With increase in asceticism during the post-Vedic period, withdrawal of sacrificial rituals was considered a threat to the gods. Ascetic humans or ascetic demons were supposed to be more powerful than gods. Pious, highly enlightened asuras and Rakshasas, such as Prahlada and Vibhishana, are not uncommon. The asura are not fundamentally against the gods, nor do they tempt humans to fall. Many people metaphorically interpret the Asura as manifestations of the ignoble passions in the human mind and as symbolic devices. There were also cases of power-hungry asuras challenging various aspects of the gods, but only to be defeated eventually and seek forgiveness.

Despite the impermanence of beings, demonic entities share characteristics impeding the chance of liberation through the realization of the Ātman, such as greed, pride, or improper rituals. However, all demonic appearances are only temporary.

=== Buddhism ===
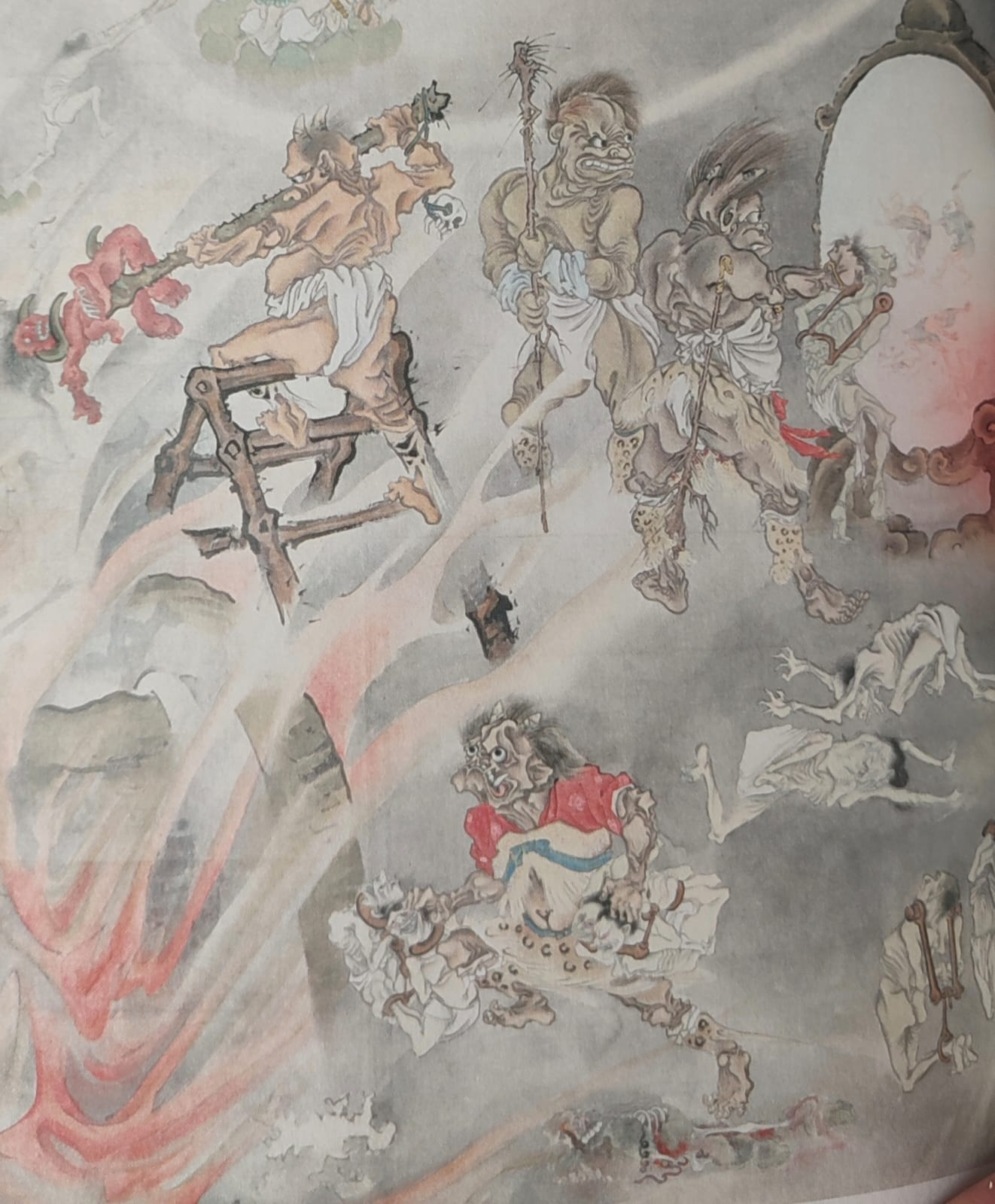
Hanging Scroll, late Edo Period, Tokyo National Museum

Buddhism classifies sentient beings into six types: Devas (gods and celestial beings), asuras (titans or demi-gods), humans, animals, preta (ghost), nāraki (hell-being). As in Hinduism, all these beings are part of the Saṃsāra. Since Buddhism rejects the existence of a permanent self (anātman), ghosts and evil spirits, such as bhūta, rākṣasa, pretas and piśāca, are not inherently evil, but reborn in states of misery as the result of bad karma. They may have good and evil characteristics, just as any other being in saṃsāra, but suffer more than beings of better rebirth. Only beings born in hell may be considered demonic in the sense of an intrinsic evil creature, however, they cannot leave their infernal place and harm none but each other. Once their evil karma is extinguished, they are reborn in upper realms.

Asuras belong to one of the four unhappy (or evil) rebirths, along with animals, ghosts, and hell-beings. They are characterized by anger, jealousy (of the gods), and pride. Despite appearing as the enemies of the gods, asuras are not evil, but have both good and bad karma. However, since their lives are pervaded by unwholesome states, rebirth as an asura is considered to be undesirable. Many texts mention anger, conceit, and doubt, as causes for birth as an asura. The early Buddhist Sutras mention „speaking evil“, „thinking evil in the mind“, and „arising of thoughts of superiority“, combined with „good deeds“ lead to rebirth as an asura. Therefore, rebirth as an asura is ambiguous: Beings from the realm of ghosts and hells ascend in the karmic hierarchy by becoming an asura on accord of the good action, whereas beings of the celestial worlds descend through the malicious actions by rebirth as an asura.

When Buddhism spread, indigenous ideas about ghosts and demons were integrated into Buddhist teachings. For example, in Chinese cultural tradition, people offer food in order to appease the suffering of the pretas (hungry ghosts) during the Zhongyuan Festival. Since such beings are not evil per se, they are not precisely demons, so the closest equivalent in English language may be the term jinn adopted from Islamic beliefs. Even though Buddhism does not deny the existence of ghosts and evil spirits, they play no important role in search for liberation from the circle of life.

Nārakis are born in hell as result of intense negative karma, wherein they suffer in a state of continuous torment until their bad karma is extinguished and they cannot accumulate further bad karma. Their actions are confined to the bad karmic actions they previously committed but are turned into an agonizing experience.

In hell, demons or hell wardens (nirayapāla) appear in order to ensure that beings born therein are continuously tortured. Vasubandhu argues that every being in hell must be, by definition, suffering and since demons do not suffer in hell, they are not real but only illusions. It is because of the result of their bad karma, the inhabitants of hell perceive demonic hell-wardens and thus, the latter are merely a projection of the former.

Demons may thus be understood as personifications of correlative mental states projected onto the external cosmos. The Pali Sutras represent the unenlightened people as "possessed" by the demons of "desire" and "craving". These two self-destructive feelings then cause the images of horrifying demons. In a state of enlightenment, the Buddha has overcome such passions and by that, conquered the demons.

== Ethnic and folkloric ==
=== Aboriginal Australian cultures ===
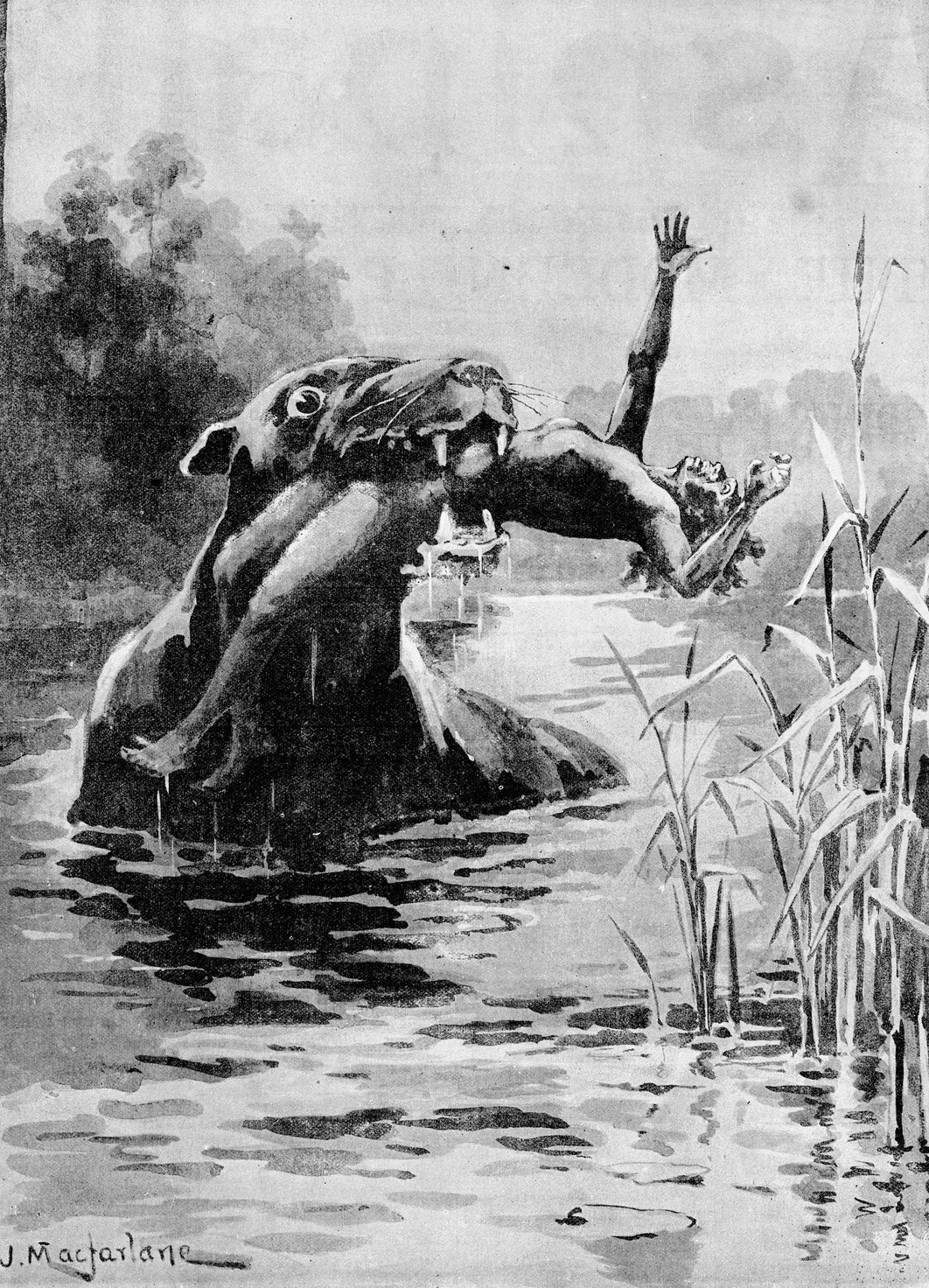
A depiction of a Bunyip.

Aboriginal Australian cultures have various beings translated into English as "demons" or "devils". The most notable is the Bunyip, which was originally a term applied to malevolent spirits in general. Tasmanian mythology in particular has many beings translated as "devils"; these include malicious spirits like Rageowrapper as well as spirits summoned in magic. Tasmanian Aboriginal people would describe these entities as "devils" and related that these spiritual beings as walking alongside Aboriginal people "carrying a torch but could not be seen".

=== Chinese folklore ===
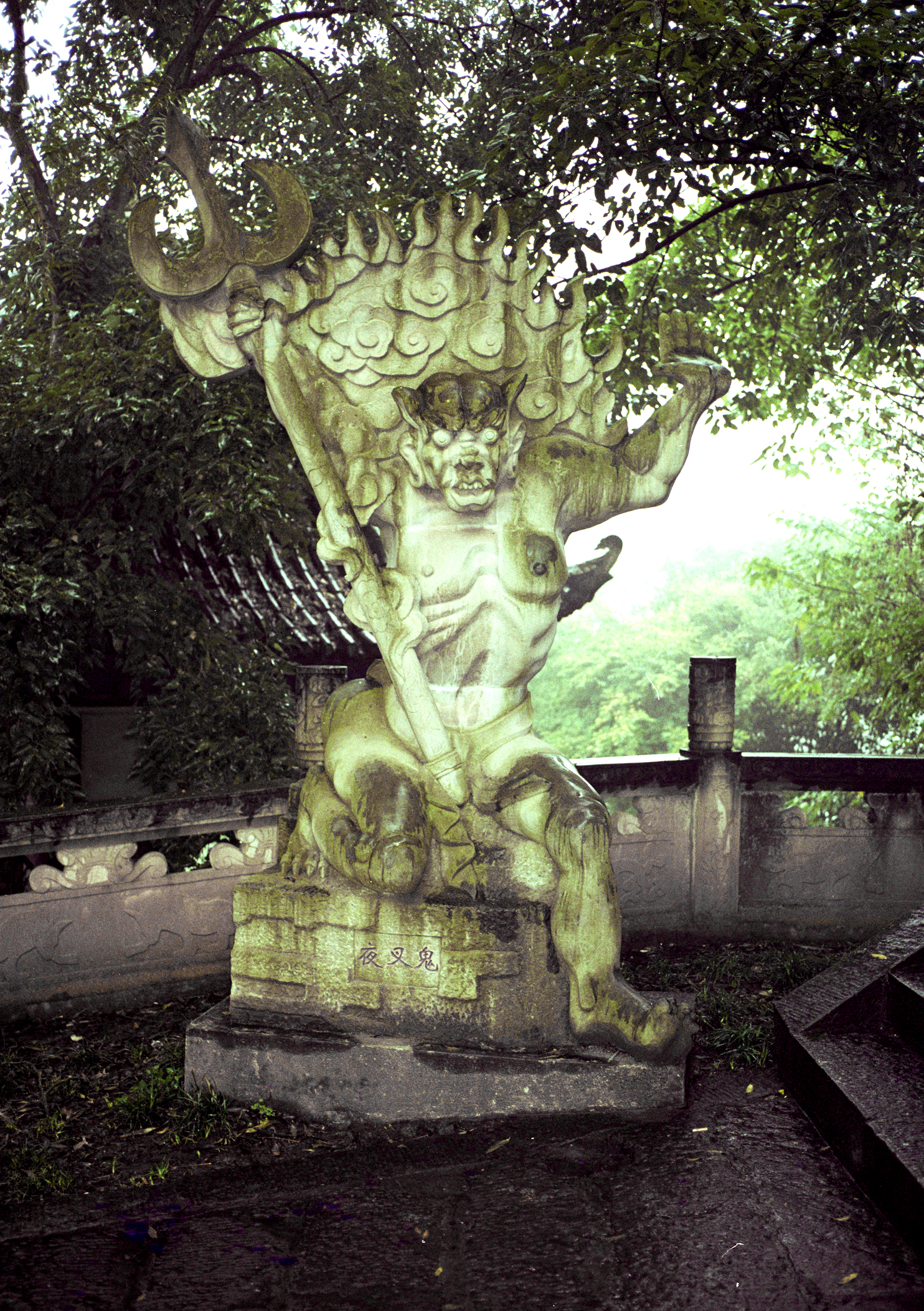
Carving of a yaksha (夜叉)

Chinese folktale, legend and literature are replete with malevolent supernatural creatures who are often rendered "demons" in English translations. These include categories of beings such as the yao 妖 – shapeshifters with the power to cause insanity, to inflict poison, and to bring about disease, and the mo 魔 – derived from Indian mythology and entering through the influence of Buddhism. In folk belief, these beings are responsible for misfortune, insanity, and illness, and any number of strange phenomena that could not easily be accounted for. Epilepsy and stroke, which led to either temporary or permanent contortions, were generally seen as the results of demonic possession and attacks (中邪).

Belief in wilderness demons haunted China from the very earliest periods and persisted throughout the late imperial era. In the Xia dynasty, nine bronze cauldrons with their forms were cast to help the common people to identify and to avoid them. Classical texts in the Zhou and Warring-States period distinguish between the demons of mountains and forests (the seductive Chimei 魑魅), demons of trees and rocks (a necrophagous fever-demon, the Wangliang 魍魎), subterranean demons of the earth and of decay (the goat-like and necrophagous Fenyang 墳羊 (lit. 'grave-goat'), who caused disease and miscarriage) and fever demons born from water (Wangxiang 罔象, a child-like being with red eyes). These demons were said to be born of aberrant qi (breath or energy), known to accost and kill travellers, and held responsible for sickness. People also feared the Muling 木灵 lit. 'tree spirit' (also muzhong 木肿 lit. 'tree swelling') – demons forming over time in trees of immense age, capable of inflicting disease and killing human passers-by and birds flying overhead. Examples include the penghou 彭侯 (lit. 'drumbeat marquis'), a demon associated with camphor trees in mountain forests, and which takes the form of a human-headed dog, and in the southern provinces, the banana-leaf spirits.

From the Tang dynasty onwards, belief in shapeshifting foxes, tigers and wolves, amongst other creatures, also featured in Chinese folk belief, partly due to the existence of outlawed fox-spirit cults. Fox demons (狐妖) are described as cunning and lustful, capable of clairvoyance, and of inflicting disease and poisoning at will. They are sometimes seen as beings requiring worship to be appeased or placated. Tiger demons (虎妖) and wolf demons (狼妖) are ravening beings roaming large territories for prey, taking the form of humans to conveniently insert themselves into communities and settlements. Tiger demons are described as being enslaved souls of humans they have killed, turning them into minions. In the superstitious climate of the previous centuries, people mistaken as tigers and wolves in human disguise were often put to death or starved in their cells by magistrates.

Fish (鱼妖) and snake demons (蛇妖) are said to have attempted to assault Confucius. Even insects are capable of being demonic. In one tale, the sighting of a centipede demon (蜈蚣妖) in the form of an old woman without eyes is said to have led to the sickness and death of an entire household.

One notable demon not in the above categories includes the Heisheng or Heiqi 黑气 ('Black Calamity' or 'Black Air'), a kind of roving vapour demon that inflicts damage to persons and property wherever it roams, sometimes killing where it goes. Another are undefined Poltergeists, sometimes afflicting monasteries, causing serious nuisances, and unable to be exorcised.

==== Disambiguation ====
The terms Yao (妖), Mo (魔), Gui (鬼), Guai (怪) and Xie (邪) are their various two-character combinations often used to refer to these creatures, but of these terms, only Mo (魔) denotes demons in the religious sense.

China has two classes of beings that might be regarded as demons, and which are generally translated as such:

- Yao (妖) – a kind of uncanny supernatural creature, usually with the power to shapeshift, to poison or to cause disease, and to bewilder or enthrall. They are associated with sorcery or sorcery-like powers. They are not always evil in the sense that Western demons or the Chinese mo (魔) are but are represented as having malevolent tendencies and as creatures of ill-omen. They are often invoked as an explanation for strange events, bizarre occurrences, mysterious diseases and horrible accidents. They resemble the unseelie fae of Celtic legend and folklore in their powers and predisposition - and are sometimes translated as 'faeries' or 'daemons' rather than 'demons'.
- Mo (魔) – derived from the "Mara" of Buddhism and are almost always evil. This kind of being is morally corrupted and rebels against the moral law and heavenly principle. Taoist cultivators, fallen Buddhist monks, gods and mortals who have succumbed to an evil inclination are said to have become demonic or become diabolical – ru mo. (入魔). As such it is often a condition and a state, rather than always being directly the result of a certain innate heritage. Furthermore, certain beings derived directly from Indian mythology, such as the luocha (罗刹 or raksasha) and yecha (夜叉 or yaksha), however are classed as being innately demonic (魔) types by heritage but are nevertheless represented as being capable of repentance or turning to good.

=== Native North America ===
The Algonquian people traditionally believe in a spirit called a wendigo. The spirit is believed to possess people who then become cannibals. In Athabaskan folklore, there is a belief in wechuge, a similar cannibal spirit.

== Psychological interpretations ==
=== Islamic world ===
A minority of Muslim scholars in the Medieval Age, often associated with the Muʿtazila and the Jahmītes, denied that demons (jinn, devils, divs etc.) have physicality and asserted, they could only affect the mind by waswās (Arabic: وَسْوَاس, 'demonic whisperings in the mind'). Some scholars, like ibn Sina, rejected the reality of jinn altogether. Al-Jāḥiẓ and al-Masʿūdī, explained jinn and demons as merely psychological phenomena.

In his Kitāb al-Hayawān, al-Jāḥiẓ states that jinn and demons are the product of loneliness. Such a state induces people to mind-games, causing waswās. Al-Masʿūdī is similarly critical regarding the reality of demons. He states that alleged demonic encounters are the result of fear and "wrong thinking". Alleged encounters are then told to other generations in bedtime stories and poems. When they grow up, they remember such stories in a state of fear or loneliness. This encourages their imaginations, resulting in another alleged demonic encounter.

=== Western world ===
Psychologist Wilhelm Wundt remarked that "among the activities attributed by myths all over the world to demons, the harmful predominate, so that in popular belief bad demons are clearly older than good ones." Sigmund Freud developed this idea and claimed that the concept of demons was derived from the important relation of the living to the dead: "The fact that demons are always regarded as the spirits of those who have died recently shows better than anything the influence of mourning on the origin of the belief in demons."

== See also ==
- Classification of demons
- List of fictional demons
- List of theological demons
- List of occult terms
- Fairy
- Folk devil
- Unclean spirit
