= Mazzikin =

Invisible demons in Jewish mythology

In Jewish mythology, mazzikin (Jewish Babylonian Aramaic: מַזִּיקִין, romanized: mazzikin, borrowed as Hebrew: מַזִּיקִים) are invisible demons that can create minor annoyances or greater dangers. This Aramaic term, which is found in the Talmud, means "damagers" or "those who harm". It is generally understood to mean harmful invisible demons that a person could encounter in daily life. While Judaism today does not often directly discuss evil spirits, as late as the Geonic period, incantation bowls made by Aramaic-speaking inhabitants of Mesopotamia and the Levant (including both practicing Jews and rabbis) were a method of protecting individuals from a large array of demons and similar spirits, such as disease spirits, mazzikin, lilin, and shedim.

== Description ==
The Talmud, a central text of Rabbinic Judaism, contains various descriptions of mazzikin throughout its pages. While these descriptions may not present a uniform or consistent portrayal, they provide insights into the understanding and beliefs about mazzikin in Jewish tradition during the time of the Talmud's composition.

The Talmud describes mazzikin as having certain characteristics similar to both angels and humans (Hagigah 16a). According to the text, mazzikin have wings like angels, can traverse great distances quickly like angels, and possess knowledge of future events like angels. However, they also share traits with humans, such as eating, drinking, procreating, and dying.

The baraita specifies: In three ways they are like ministering angels: They have wings like ministering angels; and they fly from one end of the world to the other like ministering angels; and they know what will be in the future like ministering angels.

Mazikin are believed to be numerous and constantly present around humans. Abaye, a prominent Amoraic sage, states that demons are more numerous than humans and surround them like a ridge around a field. Rav Huna, another Amora, further explains that every person has thousands of demons on each side, one thousand to the left and ten thousand to the right (Berakhot 6a).

Certain Talmudic passages describe methods of detecting mazzikin, such as sifting fine ashes around one's bed to see their footprints, which resemble the feet of a rooster (Berakhot 6a). Another method involves using a black cat, specifically a firstborn black female cat, the daughter of a firstborn black female cat. By burning its hair and grinding the ashes, then placing the ashes in one's eyes, a person could supposedly see the mazzikin (Berakhot 6a). Other passages suggest that mazzikin can be found in specific locations, such as under gutters (Pesachim 112a) or in ruins (Berakhot 3a).

The Talmud also describes practices to protect oneself from mazzikin, such as reciting the Shema Yisrael before going to sleep (Berakhot 5a).
