= Shedim =

Intermediary beings in Jewish lore

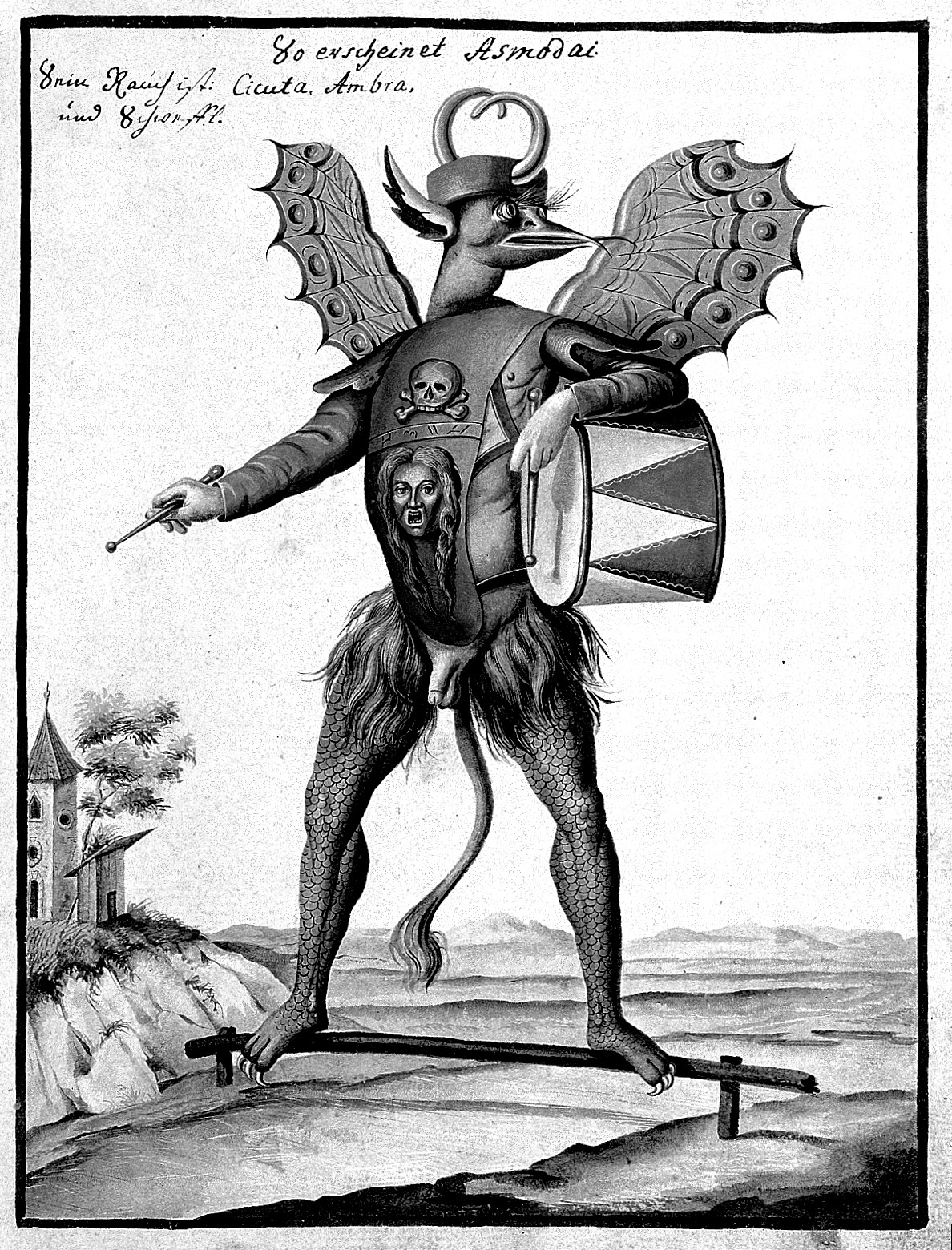
The shed Asmodeus in birdlike form, with typical rooster feet, as depicted in Compendium rarissimum totius Artis Magicae, 1775

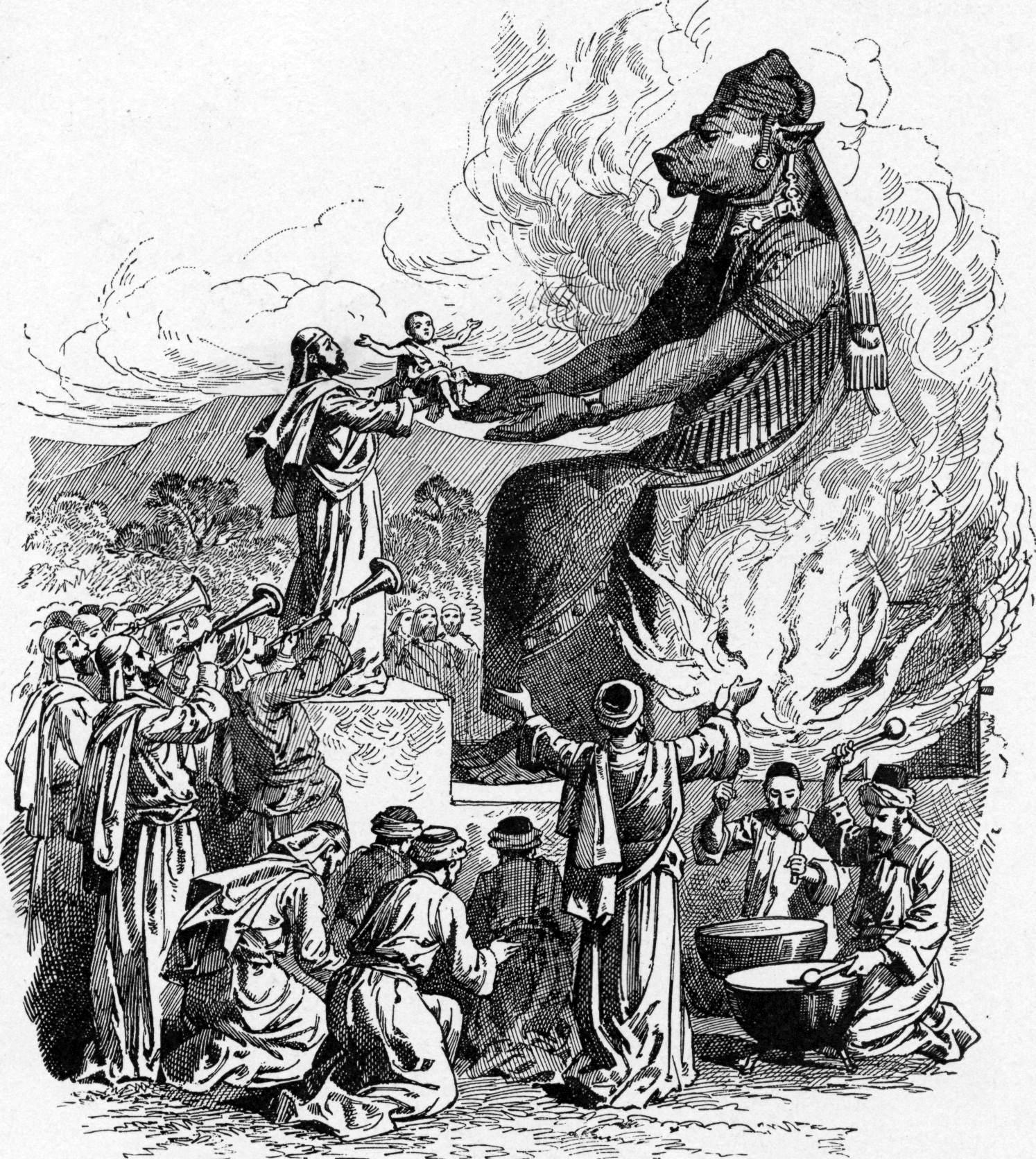
Child sacrifice to the shed Moloch, as depicted in Bible Pictures and What They Teach Us, 1897

35. And they mingled with the nations and learned their deeds. 36. They worshipped their idols, which became a snare for them. 37. They slaughtered their sons and daughters to the demons [(shedim)]. 38. They shed innocent blood, the blood of their sons and daughters whom they slaughtered to the idols of Canaan, and the land became polluted with the blood. 39. And they became unclean through their deeds, and they went astray with their acts.

— Tehillim (Psalms), 106.35–39

17. They sacrificed to demons [(shedim)], which have no power, deities they did not know, new things that only recently came, which your forefathers did not fear.

— Devarim (Deuteronomy), 32.17

Shedim (Hebrew: שֵׁדִים, romanized: šēḏim; singular: שֵׁד šēḏ) are spirits or demons in the Tanakh and Jewish mythology. Shedim do not, however, correspond exactly to the modern conception of demons as evil entities as originated in Christianity. While evil spirits were thought to cause maladies, shedim differed conceptually from evil spirits. Shedim were not considered evil demigods, but the gods of foreigners; further, they were envisaged as evil only in the sense that they were not the Hebrew god.

They appear only twice (and in both instances in the plural) in the Tanakh, at Psalm 106:37 and Deuteronomy 32:17. In both instances, the text deals with child sacrifice or animal sacrifice. Although the word is traditionally derived from the root šwd (Hebrew: שוד shuḏ) that conveys the meaning of "acting with violence" or "laying waste", it was possibly a loanword from Akkadian, in which the word 'shedu' referred to a spirit that could be either protective or malevolent. With the translation of Hebrew texts into Greek, under the influence of Zoroastrian dualism, "shedim" was translated into Greek as 'daimonia' with implicit connotations of negativity. Later, in Judeo-Islamic culture, shedim became the Hebrew word for the jinn, conveying the morally ambivalent attitude of these beings.

== Origin ==
According to one legend, the shedim are the descendants of serpents, or of demons in serpent form, in allusion to the story of the serpent in Eden, as related in Genesis. A second view is that they are the offspring of Lilith, from her union with Adam or other men, while a third says that God created them on the sixth day, starting to fashion their bodies but failing to complete the work because he was obliged to rest on the Sabbath. Even after the Sabbath, he left them as they were, in order to show that, when the Sabbath comes, all work still unfinished at the beginning of the Sabbath must afterward be viewed as complete. As a result, the shedim have souls like those of humans, but lack the bodies to contain them. Yet a fourth conception was that the shedim had their origins among the builders of the Tower of Babel – these being divided by their motivations into three groups, of which the third and worst comprised those who sought actively to wage war against God and were punished for their sacrilegious hubris by transformation into the shedim. Finally, the kabbalistic Zohar describes them as offspring of the demons Azazel and Naamah.

Biblical and rabbinical texts depict shedim as demonic entities, with references such as Deuteronomy 32:17 and Psalm 106:37 suggesting sacrifices to these beings, including human sacrifices like the firstborn. However, the extent and details of such practices in ancient Israel remain a subject of debate among scholars. Hurwitz's work, citing archaeological finds and the existing rite of 'pidjon ha'ben', supports the notion of such sacrifices, especially in the archaic period.

== Traits ==
The Talmud describes the shedim as possessing some traits of angels, and some traits of humans:

תָּנוּ רַבָּנַן, שִׁשָּׁה דְּבָרִים נֶאֶמְרוּ בַּשֵּׁדִים: שְׁלֹשָׁה כְּמַלְאֲכֵי הַשָּׁרֵת, וּשְׁלֹשָׁה כִּבְנֵי אָדָם. שְׁלֹשָׁה כְּמַלְאֲכֵי הַשָּׁרֵת — יֵשׁ לָהֶם כְּנָפַיִם כְּמַלְאֲכֵי הַשָּׁרֵת, וְטָסִין מִסּוֹף הָעוֹלָם וְעַד סוֹפוֹ כְּמַלְאֲכֵי הַשָּׁרֵת, וְיוֹדְעִין מַה שֶּׁעָתִיד לִהְיוֹת כְּמַלְאֲכֵי הַשָּׁרֵת.
The Sages taught: Six statements were said with regard to demons: In three ways they are like ministering angels, and in three ways they are like humans. The baraita specifies: In three ways they are like ministering angels: They have wings like ministering angels; and they fly from one end of the world to the other like ministering angels; and they know what will be in the future like ministering angels.

— Babylonian Talmud Hagigah 16a

According to Rabbi Rashi, shedim, like 'lilith' but unlike 'ruchos', have human form, although no human body. They eat and drink as humans do. They can cause sickness and misfortune, follow the dead and fly around graves.

One is admonished not to do any thing that could invoke the shedim, such as whistling or even saying the word "shedim". The 12th century mystic Judah ben Samuel of Regensburg wrote in his will and testament that one should not seal up windows completely because it traps shedim in the house.

The shedim are not always seen as malicious creatures; they can be helpful. Some are said to be even able to live according to the Torah, like Asmodeus.

Conjuring shedim is not necessarily forbidden, depending on whether the theologian discussing the topic views such summoning to constitute sorcery. Even if summoning shedim is an act of sorcery and thus forbidden, consulting shedim conjured by a non-Jew would be permissible.

== Appearance ==
In early midrashim, shedim are corporeal beings. They take the form of men, but have no shadow (Yeb. 122a; Giṭ. 66a; Yoma 75a). Sometimes they are black goat-like beings (Kiddushin 29a); other times, seven-headed dragons (Kiddushin 29a). They are occasionally called 'malʾake ḥabbala' (angels of destruction) (Ber. 51a; Ket. 104a; Sanh. 106b). If a man could see them, he would lack the strength to face them, although he can see them by throwing the ashes of the fetus of a black cat around his eyes, or by scattering ashes around his bed he can trace their footprints similar to those of roosters in the morning ( Ber.6a). To see if the shedim were present, ashes were thrown to the ground or floor, which rendered their footsteps visible. In later Judaism, these entities developed into more abstract beings.

Shedim can shapeshift, sometimes assuming a human form, the Talmud telling how Asmodeus assumed King Solomon's form and ruled in his place for a time.

In the Zohar:

The Shekhinah hid Esther from Ahasuerus and gave him a Shedah [a she-devil] instead while she returned to Mordecai's arms. ... This is why a man must speak with his wife before he mates with her, because she might have been exchanged with a female demon.

== See also ==
- Dybbuk
- Fairy
- Lamassu
- Mazzikin
- Se'irim
- Shdum
