= Se'irim =

Demon in shape of goats in Mesopotamian, especially Jewish, lore

Se’īrīm (Hebrew: שעירים, singular sa'ir) are demons. Sa’ir was the ordinary Hebrew word for "he-goat", and it is not always clear what the word's original meaning might have been. But in early Jewish thought, represented by targumim and possibly 3 Baruch, along with translations of the Hebrew Bible such as the Peshitta and Vulgate, the se’īrīm were understood as demons. They are considered to be the lowest of all created beings. Se'īrīm are frequently compared with the shedim of Hebrew tradition, along with satyrs of Greek mythology, fauns of Roman mythology and jinn of Arab culture. Julius Wellhausen suggested that they rather correspond to the Arabian Ifrit.

Thus Isaiah 13:21 predicts, in Karen L. Edwards's translation: "But wild animals [ziim] will lie down there, and its houses will be full of howling creatures [ohim]; there ostriches will live, and there goat-demons [sa’ir] will dance." Similarly, Isaiah 34:14 declares: "Wildcats [ziim] shall meet with hyenas [iim], goat-demons [sa’ir] shall call to each other; there too Lilith [lilit] shall repose and find a place to rest."

In the Latin Vulgate translation of the Old Testament, sa’ir is translated as "pilosus", which also means "hairy". Jerome, the translator of the Vulgate, equated these figures with satyrs.

The se'irim are also mentioned once in Leviticus 17:7 probably a recalling of Assyrian demons in shape of goats. Due to the connection to wild animals (jackals, ostriches, hyenas), there are regarded as metaphorical images of life-threatening beasts outside civilized areas. Such wild animals settling in ruined areas such as Babylon and Edom reinforces them as a symbol of divine judgement and chaos. Samuel Bochart and other Biblical scholars identified the Se'irim with Egyptian goat-deities. Leviticus 17:7 admonishes Israel to keep from sacrificing to the Se'irim. Texts from the Dead Sea Scrolls describe the nether regions as full of Se'irim.

Abraham ibn Ezra (1089 / 1092 – 27 January 1164 / 28 January 1167) writes in his commentary, that the se'irim are a form of spirits (shedim) seen by crazy people. People stray away from God by believing in them, for seeking them out implies a belief in another force besides God who can make things go good or bad. It is not clear from ibn Ezra, if he considers se'irim to be merely delusions, or real but can only be seen by crazy people (in the form of he-goats) who falsely attribute power independent from God to them.
