= Kaleidica =

The Kaleidica Light Instrument
- Example Kaleidica Output
- Original author(s): Fishrock Studios
- Stable release: 2.0 / August, 2005
- Platform: Windows XP, Mac OS X
- Type: Graphic Design, Digital Art
- License: Proprietary
- Website: Official Kaleidica website

The Kaleidica Light Instrument, is software developed by Chuck Henderson and published by Fishrock Studios for creating symmetrical and abstract pattern art, animations and real-time user-generated light-shows much like a mechanical kaleidoscope. Kaleidica creates imagery and script-generated animations based on a number of geometric algorithms that arrange arrays of images or animation clips in various user-determined patterns. Composed of multiple internal "studios," Kaleidica can produce patterns reminiscent of kaleidoscope art, Arabic tapestries, psychedelic "op-art," mandala and yantra meditative patterns, and abstract forms akin to Kandinsky or Renoir. Kaleidica uses images as brushes that are selected from a collection of image libraries. Images libraries can be changed and new libraries can be created by users. Animated brush effects are created by cycling through a series of images creating three dimensional and abstract effects.

In light-show mode users of the Kaleidica are able to move the mouse in-sync with music and simultaneously manipulate a variety of functions using the keyboard. Subtle and vigorous effects can be achieved by manipulating blend, rotation, image-brush size, skew, etc.

The sequel to Yantram: Sacred Art Toolbox (Published in 2000 also by fishrock studios), Kaleidica enables users to record and play-back the process of creating symmetrical art, effectively creating full-screen animations. Using simultaneous input from both keyboard and mouse, users manipulate the position, size, rotation, blend, skew and other variables in real-time. Computers with modest video card and processor speeds can display evolving artwork in sync with live or recorded music suitable for interactive light-shows. Kaleidica uses single images and loops of sequential images as animated brushes. These image-brushes are written to the screen buffer much like paint applied to a canvas. In the case of Kaleidica multiple brush strokes are applies simultaneously to create the kaleidoscopic variations.

== Description ==
An example of the artwork created with Kaleidica.

Kaleidica is a collection of five unique graphic studios. Each studio paints a different geometric pattern which adds to the artwork developing on the screen. By switching between studios the artist augments and develops the art into a unique kaleidoscopic expression. The artwork can be saved as a screen image and sequential images can be saved as animated clips.

In each studio, the artist controls the movement of selectable graphic images (called brushes) with the mouse. Simultaneously the artist manipulates in real time the size, rotation, symmetry, blend and many other characteristics of the brush with the keyboard.

The studios inside Kaleidica include the maze studio, the mirror studio, the star studio, the array studio, and the kaleido studio, among others.

In most Kaleidica Studios the currently selected brush lays down multiple impressions on the screen as specified by the current artist defined symmetry. The brush symmetrically paints to the screen usually radiating from central point called the "centroid" creating the dramatic kaleidoscopic effect.

Users may retrieve content from the program by capturing the screen. As well, users can record their actions on the screen in real time to be later replayed.

== Custom Content ==
Users can upload their own content into Kaleidica, using their own images as brushes. The Kaleidica website sometimes has updated brushes and studios, such as the recent Louvre studio.

== See also ==
- Kaleidoscope
