= List of lantern slide collections =

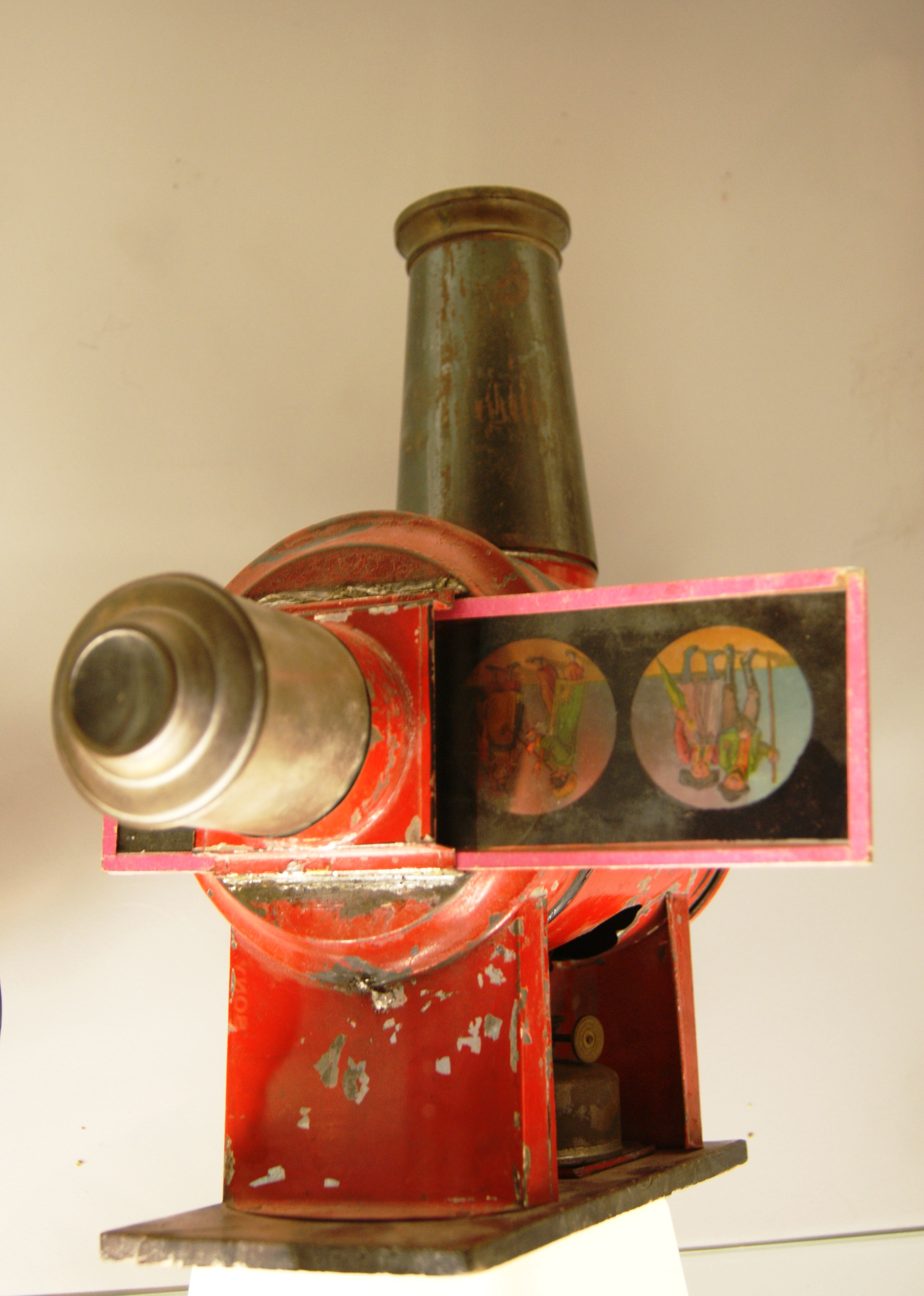
A magic lantern with printed slide inserted (upright, so if the lantern was lit it would project an inverted picture)

This list of lantern slide collections provides an overview of collections held in institutions internationally. The magic lantern was a very popular medium, particularly so from the 18th to the early 20th Century. There are many collections which remain uncatalogued. As a result, this list is likely to continue to expand as more information is made available.

== Terminology ==
The terms "lantern slides" and "magic lantern" are used here as umbrella terms for describing objects related to the historical art of projection. Various terms can be found across history, disciplines, intended audiences or for descriptions of specific formats of slides and types of lanterns. In English, historical terms for "lantern slides" are "transparencies", "photographic transparencies", "slides" and "magic lantern slides". Alternative terms for magic lanterns include "optical lantern", "sciopticon", "stereopticon", "projection apparatus", "toy lantern" and more. The Lucerna Magic Lantern Web Resource and the Magic Lantern and Lantern Slide Catalog Collection on Media History Digital Library offer sources that display the range of terminology used. This list welcomes all references, independent of the term that the respective collection uses to describe its material.

== About the collections ==
The majority of the collections included form part of museum, archive, and library collections which are made available to researchers either by appointment or through digital platforms. Magic, or optical, lantern slides vary in date, subject, format and use, and the collections listed reflect that variation. The collections are arranged by country, specifying collection name and description where known. Collections owned by private individuals are not listed.

== Australia ==
| Institution | Department | Location | Collection |
|---|---|---|---|
| Museum Victoria | | Melbourne | Various Collections. Around 4,000 slides, ranging from narrative slides to astronomical, industrial, portraits, advertisements and more. |
| National Film and Sound Archive | | Canberra | Documents and Artefacts Collection. 10,000 glass slides including cinema slides, song slides and theatre advertisements. |
| University of Melbourne | | Melbourne | School of Ecosystem and Forest Science (SEFS) lantern glass slide collection. 950 chiefly black & white photographic lantern slides, 8x8cm, compiled to provide knowledge about trees and forests in Victoria as well as about their environmental location. |

== Belgium ==
| Institution | Department | Location | Collection |
|---|---|---|---|
| Museum of Modern Art, Antwerp | Robert Vrielynck Collection | Antwerp | Lanterns and lantern slides are part of the Vrielynck Collection. The collection contains many optical apparatuses. Some items are digitized and documented on M HKA's website. |

== Canada ==
| Institution | Department | Location | Collection |
|---|---|---|---|
| Digitized Okanagan History | | Kelowna, BC | 395 digitized lantern glass slides available online, from the collection of the Historic O'Keefe Ranch |
| Toronto International Film Festival | The Film Reference Library | Toronto, Ontario | Lantern Slide Collection. The collection consists of 91 narrative slides. |

== Denmark ==
| Institution | Department | Location | Collection |
|---|---|---|---|
| Danmarks Tekniske Universitet | DTU Historie en Samlingsdatabase | Lyngby | Lantern Slide Collection from different fields of engineering (bridge building, building materials). The digital collection has over 1,000 slides online . |

== France ==
| Institution | Department | Location | Collection |
|---|---|---|---|
| Cinémathèque Française | | Paris | Laterna magica. The dedicated portal for searching the Cinémathèque's collection of around 17,000, 18th to early 20th century, lantern slides. |

== Germany ==
| Institution | Department | Location | Collection |
|---|---|---|---|
| University of Hamburg | Kunstgeschichtliches Seminar der Universität Hamburg | Hamburg | Slide Archive. Around 170,000 lantern size glass slides, manufactured from 1900 up to 1980 from all fields of Archeology and Art History, used by famous art historians such as Erwin Panofsky and Wolfgang Schöne. Slide Projectors. Digitization in progress since 2016, about 3,000 images online in database (password protected). |

== Italy ==
| Institution | Department | Location | Collection |
|---|---|---|---|
| National Museum of Cinema | | Turin | Over 8,000 standard and movement slides from two major collections, some of which have been digitised.: Maria Adriana Prolo Collection; John and William Barnes Collection. |
| Museum of Precinema | | Padua | Minici Zotti Collection. Mostly hand painted, illustrated with engravings transferred onto glass or hand-coloured photographic slides. The collection also includes dissolving view slides, chromatropes and other movement slides. |

== Netherlands ==
| Institution | Department | Location | Collection |
|---|---|---|---|
| EYE Film Institute Netherlands | Film museum | Amsterdam | Slide Archive with more than 7,000 lantern slides in various formats and types; some from the 18th Century. Contains many toy slides, lecture sets, hand-painted dissolving views and some apparatus. Parts of the collection are accessible in the EYE Collection Database, a little fraction (c. 2,000 images) is accessible online via the Lucerna Magic Lantern Web Resource |
| Museum Sloten | Museum Stedhûs Sleat | Sloten / Sleat | Local Museum that has the collection of lanternist Peter Bonnet on permanent display |
| Speelgoedmuseum Deventer | | Deventer | Local toy museum with approximately 200 lantern slides and other optical media collections. |
| Stichting Nationaal Museum van Wereldculturen | Stichting Nationaal Museum van Wereldculturen | Leiden | Slide Archive with approximately 10,000 lantern slides, mostly in standard format, used by museum-, educational- and public lectures in Afrikamuseum, Tropenmuseum (in history part of the Royal Tropical Institute)and Museum Volkenkunde. Most slides were produced between 1900 and 1960s. Most of the collection is digitized in own database, accessible online on our collectionsite |
| Utrecht University | Utrecht University Museum | Utrecht | Slide Archive with approximately 30,000 lantern slides, mostly in standard format, used by various departments for university teaching and public lectures. Most slides were produced between 1895 and 1950s. Parts of the collection are digitized in own database, a little fraction is accessible online via the Lucerna Magic Lantern Web Resource |

== Spain ==
| Institution | Department | Location | Collection |
|---|---|---|---|
| Cinema Museum (Girona) | Tomàs Mallol Collection | Girona | Lanterns and lantern slides are part of the collection Tomàs Mallol. The collection contains many optical apparatuses. All items are digitized and documented on the museum's website as well as in the Lucerna magic lantern web resource. |

== South Africa ==
| Institution | Department | Location | Collection |
|---|---|---|---|
| Rhodes University | Lidbetter Photographic Collection | Makhanda | The Lidbetter Photographic collection consists of 167 glass negatives that are 17 x 22 cm in size, 10 that are 12 x 16 cm, and 9 that are 8 x 10.5 cm. In addition there are 80 plus non-glass negatives of various sizes, all dated from 1925 onwards. |
| Rhodes University | Sir George Cory Lantern Slide Collection | Makhanda | Sir George Cory Lantern Slide Collection. |

== United Kingdom ==
| Institution | Department | Location | Collection |
|---|---|---|---|
| Franses Tapestry Archive | | London | A collection of lantern slides depicting historic UK interiors including tapestries, embroideries and lace. Around 600 slides. |
| Science Museum Group | | London, Bradford | A wide selection of lantern slides from the 18th and 19th century, including dissolving views, slipping slides, narrative sets and large format slides made for the Royal Polytechnic Institution in London. |
| University of Bristol | The Theatre Collection | Bristol | Magic Lantern Slide Collection. Several sets of lantern slides from the late 19th Century, some of which have been digitised. |
| University of Exeter | Bill Douglas Cinema Museum | Exeter | Bill Douglas and Peter Jewell Collection. Around 1,000 lantern slides. |
| University of Brighton | Screen Archive South East | Brighton | Screen Archive South East. Several thousands of slides mostly from the 19th century. Some are digitised and accessible via the collection's web page. |
| University of Glasgow | Glasgow University Library, Special Collections Department | Glasgow | Ashton Photographic Collection. Over three thousand slides brought together by amateur photographer John Cooper Ashton depicting 19th century European scenery, antiquities and natural history. |
| University of Manchester | John Rylands Library | Manchester | Brethren Lantern Slides Collection. 100 lantern slides depicting Christian missionary activity around the world, all of which have been digitised and are available to view online. |
| University of Sheffield | The University Library, Special Collections Department | Sheffield | Beet Lantern Slide Collection. Around 2,500 lantern slides on a wide range of subjects. It includes photographic slides depicting Sheffield and home-made glass slides. |
| The Folklore Society | University College London's Special Collections | London | A collection of lantern slides illustrating various folk tales from around the world by the artist and photographer Henry Underhill. Over 300 slides. |

== United States ==
| Institution | Department | Location | Collection |
|---|---|---|---|
| Academy of Motion Pictures Arts and Sciences | Margaret Herrick Library | Los Angeles, California | Thanhouser Studio Collection. 17 Lantern slides from Thanhouser Film Corporation (née Thanhouser Company). |
| Columbia University | Department of Art History and Archaeology | New York City, New York | Approximately 70,000 slides created for the purposes of teaching art history, documenting art, archaeology, architecture, and design. Slides are currently being digitized. Names associated with the collection include Meyer Schapiro, Rudolph Wittkower, Margarete Bieber, Paul Wingert, William Bell Dinsmoor, and Richard Brilliant. |
| Library of Congress | Prints and Photograph Division | Washington, D.C. | Frances Benjamin Johnston Collection. Lantern slides for Garden and Historic House Lectures.; Genthe Collection. Over 470 photographic lantern slides. |
| Ohio State University | Jerome Lawrence and Robert E. Lee Theatre Research Institute | Columbus, Ohio | Joel E. Rubin Collection. The collection consists of materials relating to lighting design and equipment. It includes hand-painted scenery and 'pose' lantern slides. |
| University of South Florida | Special Collections Department, Tampa Library | Tampa, Florida | Photographic Lantern Slide Collection. Around 600 geographic/travel slides. |
