= Carpenter and Westley =

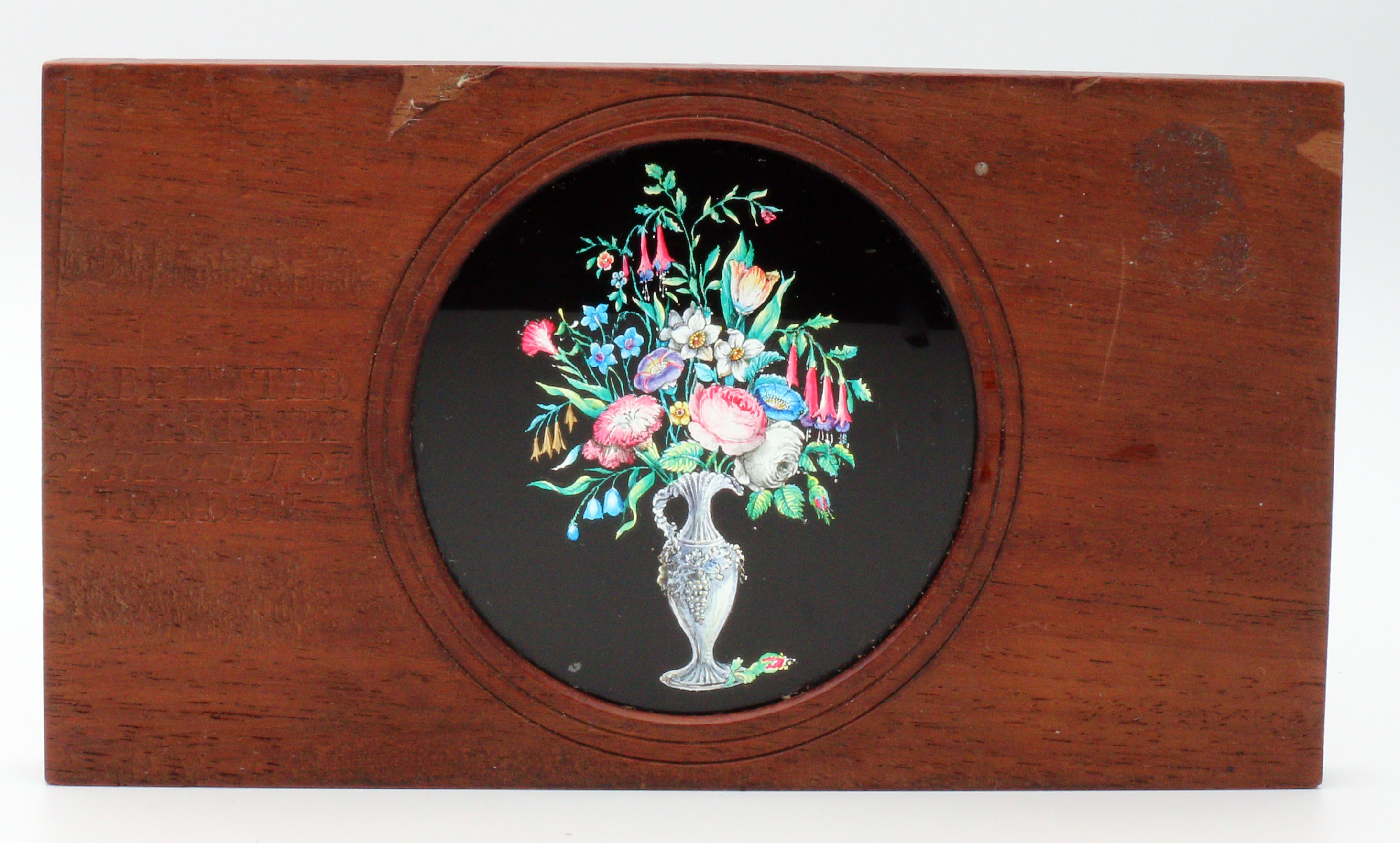
- Magic lantern slide
- Industry: Optical instruments
- Predecessor: Philip Carpenter
- Founded: 1808
- Founder: Philip Carpenter
- Defunct: 1914
- Fate: Closed
- Headquarters: Birmingham (1808–1826), London (1826–1914), England
- Key people: Philip Carpenter, William Westley, Mary Carpenter
- Products: Magic lanterns, kaleidoscopes, spectacles, scientific instruments

Carpenter and Westley were a British optical, mathematical and scientific instrument makers between 1808 and 1914. The company was founded by Philip Carpenter (18 November 1776, Kidderminster – 20 April 1833, London) and, after his death, was continued by his sister Mary Carpenter alongside former apprentice William Westley. The company's contribution to the development of magic lanterns was significant and Philip Carpenter pioneered the use of copperplate slides.

== History ==
The company was founded in 1808 when Carpenter opened his first workshop on Inge Street in Birmingham. They manufactured many instruments and devices that use lenses. Over the years the company produced thermometers, microscopes, sympiesometers, spectacles, and Claude glasses. Carpenter's expertise in optics allowed him to be a significant figure in the development of other devices and the company would become well known for a variety of products. He quickly became a leading figure in the production of achromatic lenses, even supplying Peter Dollond, a renowned developer of the lenses. He made instruments for various opticians including John Benjamin Dancer who would for a time help to make some for Carpenter's company. By 1815 he had outgrown these premises and moved his manufacturing to Bath Row with a shop on New Street.

=== The kaleidoscope ===
In 1817 Sir David Brewster invented the kaleidoscope and chose Carpenter as the manufacturer. This proved to be a massive success with two hundred thousand kaleidoscopes sold in London and Paris in just three months. Realising that the company could not meet this level of demand Brewster requested permission from Carpenter on 17 May 1818 for the device to be made by other manufacturers, to which he agreed.

=== Magic lantern developments ===
Magic lanterns had widely been used for entertainment towards the end of the 18th Century, particularly in phantasmagoria and galanty shows, and became more publicly available in the early 1800s. The lantern slides had to be individually hand painted, a time-consuming and costly process, until Carpenter developed a method to mass-produce them using a copper plate printing process. This enabled outline images to be repeatedly printed onto glass and thus create reproducible sets of slides. These outline images could be more easily and quickly hand painted ready for sale. The production of this imagery allowed people to look at magic lanterns in a new way, giving the potential for use in education and other fields. Popular topics included royalty, flora and fauna, and geographical/man-made structures from around the world. The first known set was completed by 1823 showing a number of zoological subjects, followed by astronomical slides. These slides were for the day very good but Carpenter and Westley's slides would in time become highly regarded for their detail. To accompany the slide sets Carpenter produced detailed notes in script form allowing presenters to show the images while running through a prescribed text.

Carpenter focused on the manufacture of magic lanterns for several years and was successful enough to relocate the business. In 1826 he moved to Regent Street and opened "The Microcosm", a public gallery and shop centred on microscopes.

=== Formation of Carpenter and Westley ===
Philip Carpenter died on 20 April 1833. His sister Mary Carpenter continued the business alongside her husband, Philip's former apprentice William Westley, and the company was renamed "Carpenter and Westley" in 1835. By the 1850s the company's focus had moved more towards sale rather than manufacture, with much of the stock coming from Negretti and Zambra. Carpenter and Westley ceased trading in 1914.
