= Magic lantern =

Type of image projector

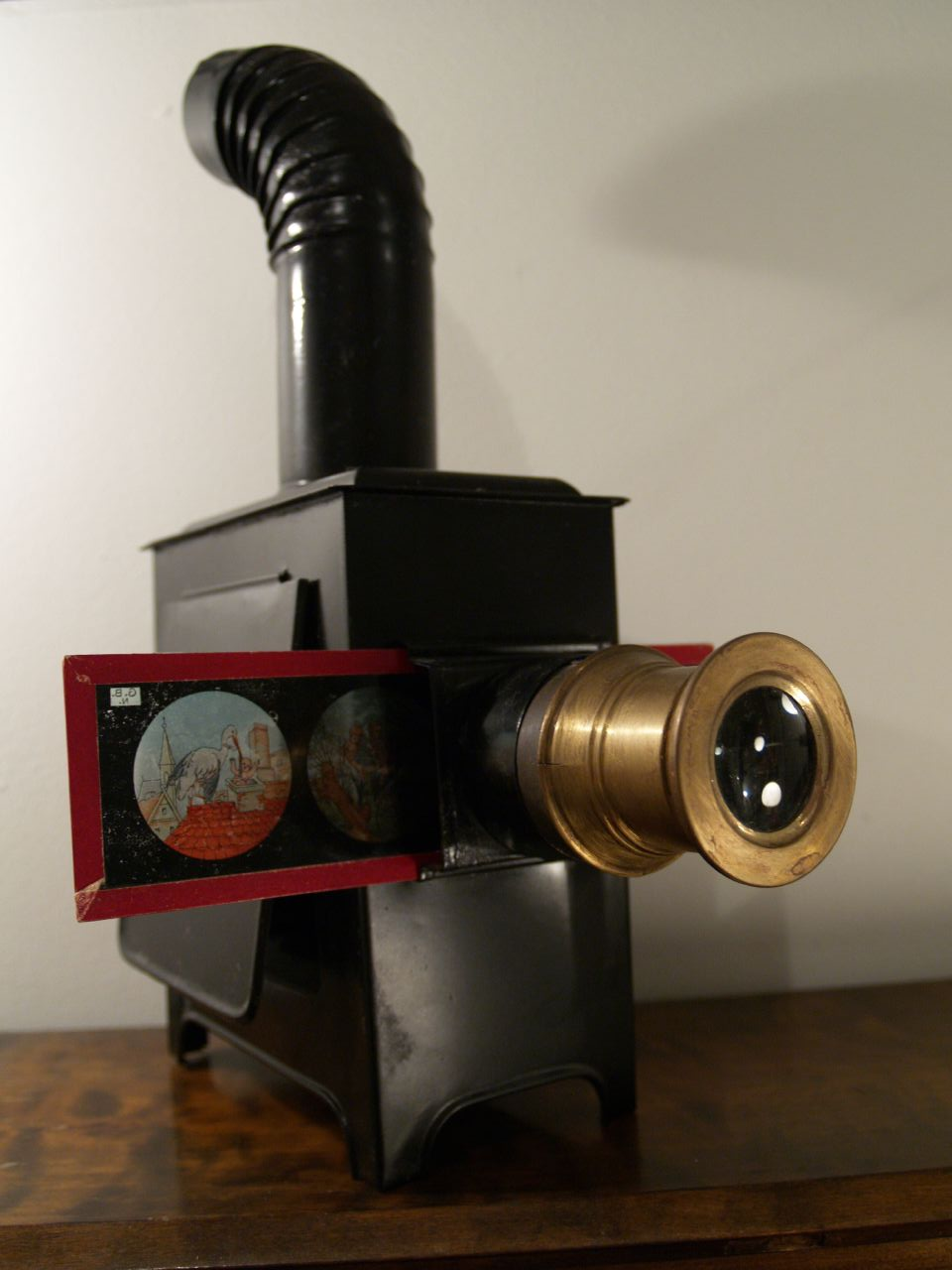
A 19th century magic lantern with printed slide incorrectly inserted (upright, which would be projected by the lantern as an inverted picture)

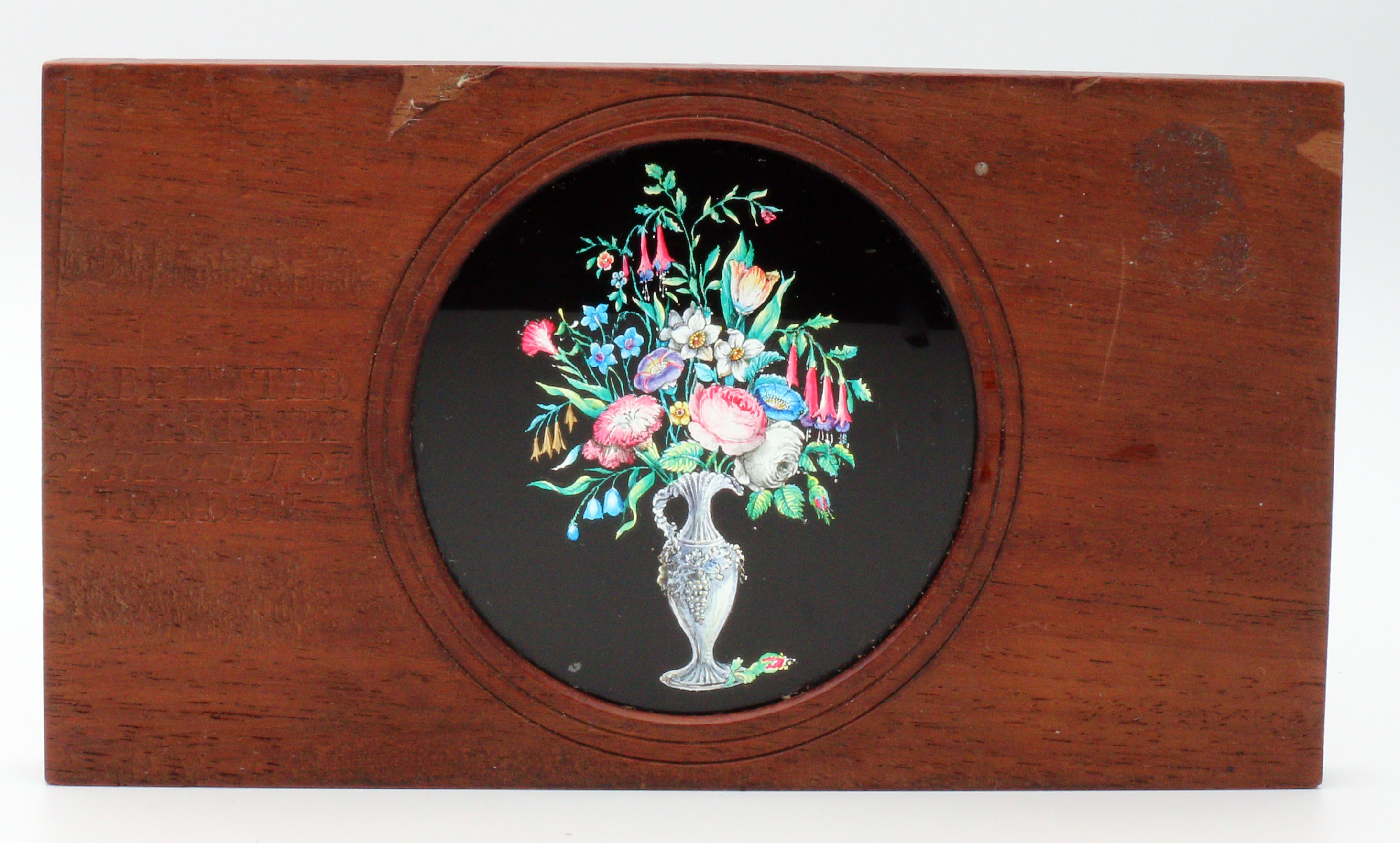
A magic lantern slide by Carpenter and Westley

The magic lantern, also known by its Latin name lanterna magica, is an early type of image projector that uses pictures—paintings, prints, or photographs—on transparent plates, usually made of glass, one or more lenses, and a light source. Because a single lens inverts an image projected through it, as in the phenomenon which inverts the image of a camera obscura, slides are inserted upside down in the magic lantern, rendering the projected image correctly oriented.

It was mostly developed in the 17th century and commonly used for entertainment purposes. It was increasingly used for education during the 19th century. Since the late 19th century, smaller versions were also mass-produced as toys. The magic lantern was in wide use from the 18th century until the mid-20th century when it was superseded by a compact version that could hold many 35 mm photographic slides: the slide projector.

== Technology ==
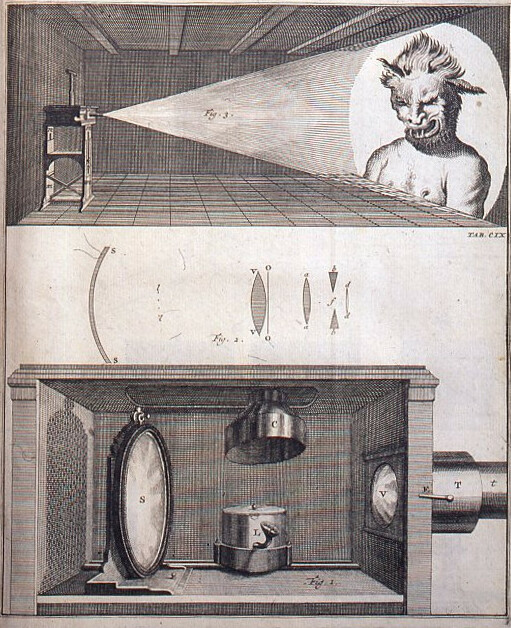
A page of Willem 's Gravesande's 1720 book Physices Elementa Mathematica with Jan van Musschenbroek's magic lantern projecting a monster. The depicted lantern is one of the oldest known preserved examples, and is in the collection of Museum Boerhaave, Leiden

=== Apparatus ===
The magic lantern used a concave mirror behind a light source to direct the light through a small rectangular sheet of glass—a "lantern slide" that bears the image—and onward into a lens at the front of the apparatus. The lens is adjusted to focus the plane of the slide at the distance of the projection screen, which can be simply a white wall, and it forms an enlarged image of the slide on the screen. Some lanterns, including those of Christiaan Huygens and Jan van Musschenbroek, used three lenses for the objective.

Biunial lanterns, with two objectives, became common during the 19th century and enabled a smooth and easy change of pictures. Stereopticons added more powerful light sources to optimize the projection of photographic slides.

=== Slides ===
Originally the pictures were hand painted on glass slides. Initially, figures were rendered with black paint but soon transparent colors were also used. Sometimes the painting was done on oiled paper. Usually black paint was used as a background to block superfluous light, so the figures could be projected without distracting borders or frames. Many slides were finished with a layer of transparent lacquer, but in a later period cover glasses were also used to protect the painted layer. Most handmade slides were mounted in wood frames with a round or square opening for the picture.

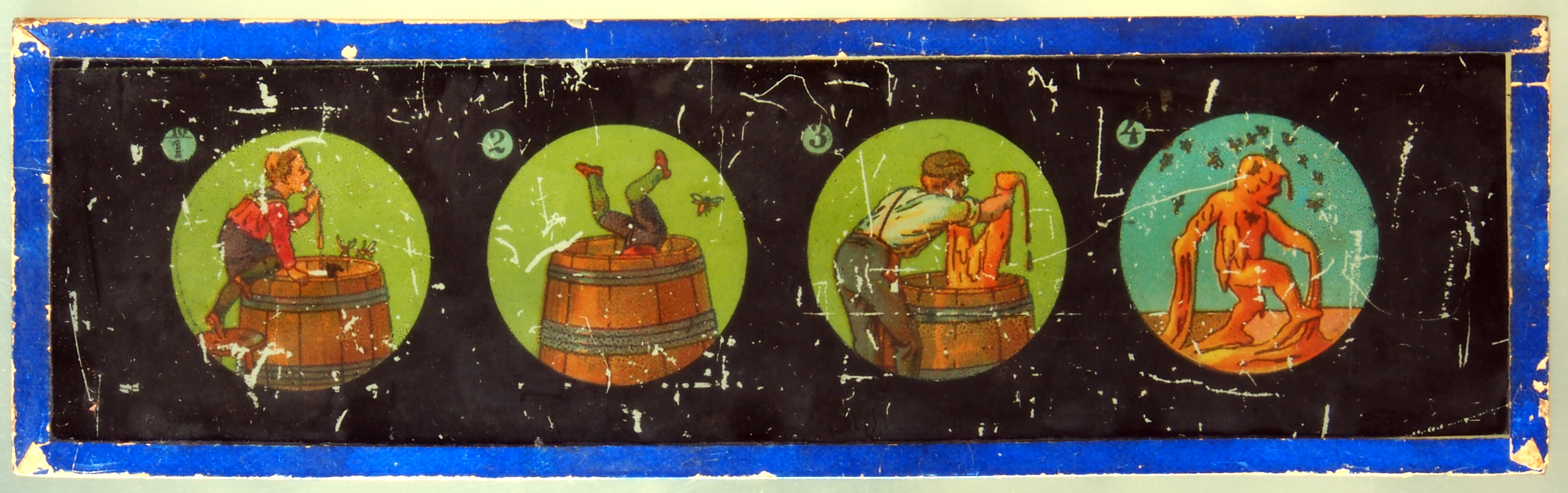
A paper rimmed mass-produced slide

After 1820 the manufacturing of hand colored printed slides started, often making use of decalcomania transfers. Many manufactured slides were produced on strips of glass with several pictures on them and rimmed with a strip of glued paper.

The first photographic lantern slides, called hyalotypes, were invented by the German-born brothers Ernst Wilhelm (William) and Friedrich (Frederick) Langenheim in 1848 in Philadelphia and patented in 1850.

=== Light sources ===
Apart from sunlight, the only light sources available at the time of invention in the 17th century were candles and oil lamps, which were very inefficient and produced very dim projected images. The invention of the Argand lamp in the 1790s helped to make the images brighter. The invention of limelight in the 1820s made them even brighter, emitting about 6,000–8,000 lumens. The invention of the intensely bright electric arc lamp in the 1860s eliminated the need for combustible gases or hazardous chemicals, and eventually the incandescent electric lamp further improved safety and convenience, although not brightness.

== Precursors ==
Several types of projection systems existed before the invention of the magic lantern. Giovanni Fontana, Leonardo da Vinci and Cornelis Drebbel described or drew image projectors that had similarities to the magic lantern. In the 17th century, there was an immense interest in optics. The telescope and microscope were invented and apart from being useful to some scientists, such instruments were especially popular as entertaining curiosities to people who could afford them. The magic lantern would prove a natural successor.

=== Camera obscura ===
The magic lantern can be seen as a further development of camera obscura. This is a natural phenomenon that occurs when an image of a scene at the other side of a screen, a wall, is projected through a small hole in that screen as an inverted image, left to right and upside down, on a surface opposite to the opening. It was known at least since the 5th century BC and experimented with in darkened rooms at least since c. 1000 AD. The use of a lens in the hole has been traced back to c. 1550.

The portable camera obscura box with a lens was developed in the 17th century. Dutch inventor Cornelis Drebbel is thought to have sold one to Dutch poet, composer and diplomat Constantijn Huygens in 1622. The oldest known clear description of a box-type camera is in German Jesuit scientist Gaspar Schott's 1657 book Magia universalis naturæ et artis.

=== Steganographic mirror ===
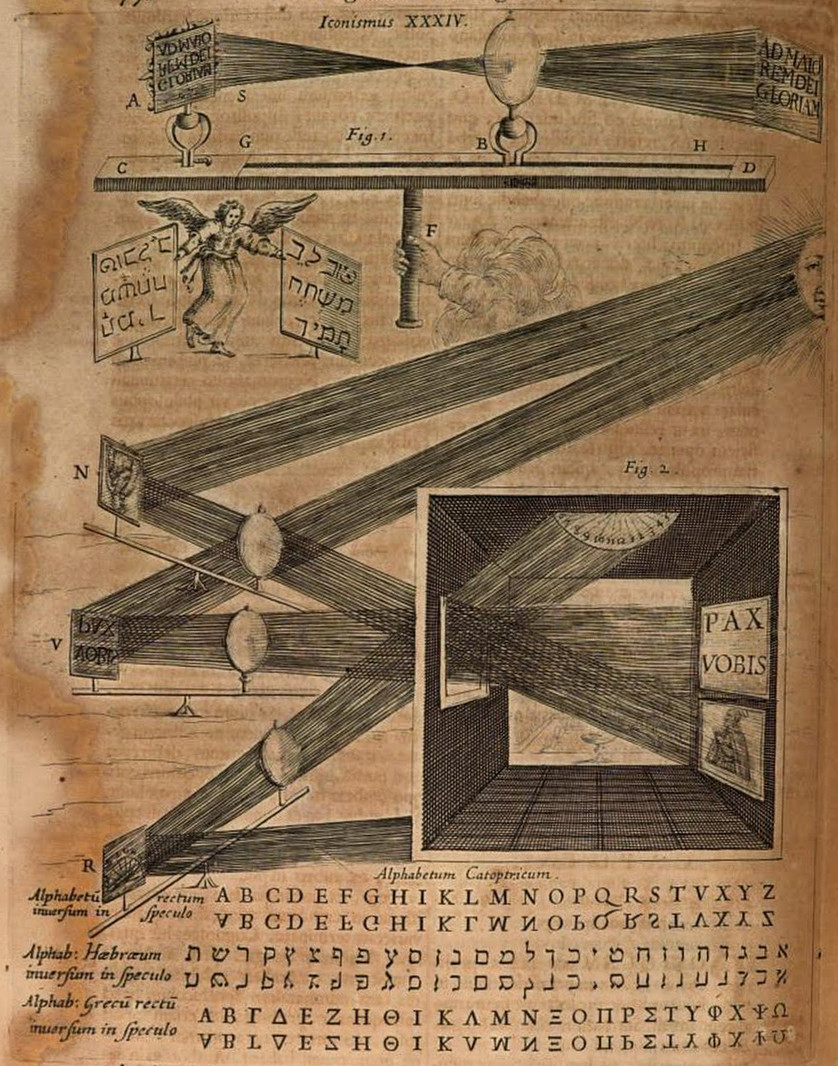
An illustration of Kircher's Steganographic mirror in his 1645 book Ars Magna Lucis et Umbrae

The 1645 first edition of German Jesuit scholar Athanasius Kircher's book Ars Magna Lucis et Umbrae included a description of a "Steganographic Mirror" he had invented: a primitive projection system with a focusing lens and text or pictures painted on a concave mirror reflecting sunlight, mostly intended for long-distance communication. Kircher saw limitations in the increase of size and diminished clarity over a long distance and expressed his hope that someone would find a method to improve on this.

In Magia universalis, Schott relates how many were using Kircher's technique to exhibit wondrous things to enthusiastic audiences. For instance, the Belgian Jesuit mathematician André Tacquet had shown missionary Martino Martini's complete journey from China to Belgium, when Martini was in Leuven in 1654.

Some reports say that Martini lectured throughout Europe with a magic lantern, which he might have imported from China, but there's no evidence that it used anything other than Kircher's technique. However, Tacquet was a correspondent and friend of Christiaan Huygens and may have been a very early adapter of the magic lantern technique that Huygens developed around this period.

== Invention ==
=== Christiaan Huygens ===
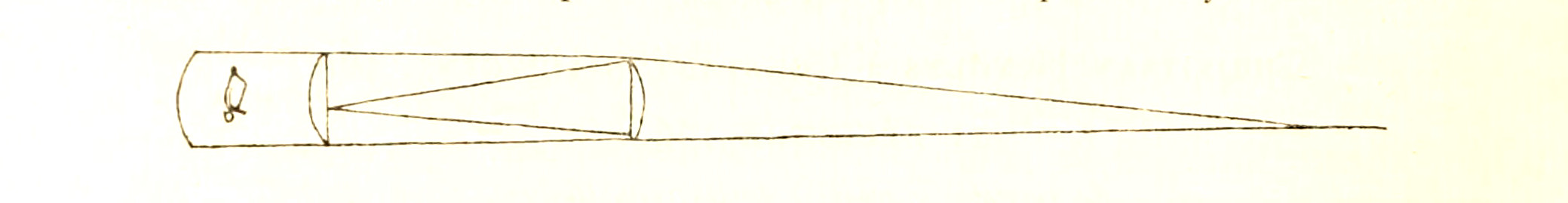
A sketch of the lantern configuration, without a slide, from Huygens's letter to Pierre Petit, December 1664

Dutch scientist Christiaan Huygens is considered as one of the possible inventors of the magic lantern. He knew Athanasius Kircher's 1645 edition of Ars Magna Lucis et Umbrae, which described a primitive projection system with a focusing lens and text or pictures painted on a concave mirror reflecting sunlight. Christiaan's father Constantijn was acquainted with Cornelis Drebbel, who used some unidentified optical techniques to transform himself and to summon appearances in magical performances. Constantijn Huygens wrote about a camera obscura device that he got from Drebbel in 1622.

The oldest known document concerning the magic lantern is a page on which Christiaan Huygens made ten small sketches of a skeleton taking off its skull, above which he wrote "for representations by means of convex glasses with the lamp" (translated from French). As this page was found between documents dated in 1659, it is believed to have been made in the same year. Huygens soon seemed to regret this invention, as he thought it was too frivolous.

In a 1662 letter to his brother Lodewijk he claimed he thought of it as some old "bagatelle" and seemed convinced that it would harm the family's reputation if people found out the lantern came from him. Christiaan reluctantly sent a lantern to their father, but when he realized that Constantijn intended to show the lantern to the court of King Louis XIV at the Louvre, Christiaan asked Lodewijk to sabotage the lantern.

Christiaan initially referred to the magic lantern as "la lampe" and "la lanterne". In the last years of his life he used the then common term "laterna magica" in some notes. In 1694, he drew the principle of a "laterna magica" with two lenses.

=== Walgensten, the Dane ===
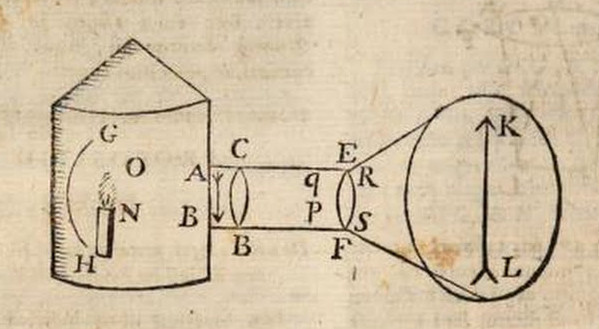
Walgensten's magic lantern as illustrated in Claude Dechales Cursus seu Mundus Mathematicus — Tomus secundus (1674)

Thomas Rasmussen Walgensten (c. 1627–1681), a mathematician from Gotland, studied at the university of Leiden in 1657–58. He possibly met Christiaan Huygens during this time, and may have learned about the magic lantern from him. Correspondence between them is known from 1667. From 1664 until 1670, Walgensten demonstrated the magic lantern in Paris (1664), Lyon (1665), Rome (1665–1666), and Copenhagen (1670).

He "sold such lanterns to different Italian princes in such an amount that they now are almost everyday items in Rome", according to Athanasius Kircher in 1671. In 1670, Walgensten projected an image of Death at the court of King Frederick III of Denmark. This scared some courtiers, but the king dismissed their cowardice and requested to repeat the figure three times. The king died a few days later.

After Walgensten died, his widow sold his lanterns to the Royal Danish Collection, but they have not been preserved. Walgensten is credited with coining the term Laterna Magica, assuming he communicated this name to Claude Dechales who, in 1674, published about seeing the machine of the "erudite Dane" in 1665 in Lyon.

=== Possible German origins: Wiesel and Griendel ===
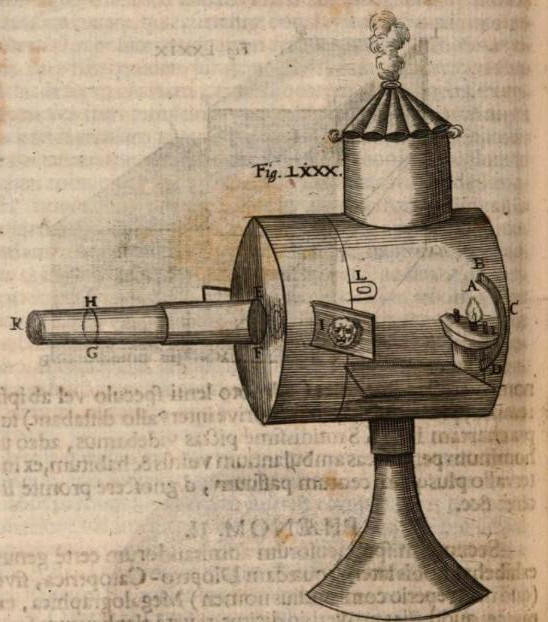
An illustration of an early southern German lantern from Johann Sturm, Collegium Experimentale (1677)

There are many gaps and uncertainties in the magic lantern's recorded history. A separate early magic lantern tradition seems to have been developed in southern Germany and includes lanterns with horizontal cylindrical bodies, while Walgensten's lantern and probably Huygens's both had vertical bodies. This tradition dates at least to 1671, with the arrival of instrument maker Johann Franz Griendel in the city of Nürnberg, which Johann Zahn identified as one of the centers of magic lantern production in 1686.

Griendel was named as the inventor of the magic lantern by Johann Christoph Kohlhans in a 1677 publication. It has been suggested that this tradition is older and that instrument maker Johann Wiesel (1583–1662) from Augsburg may have been making magic lanterns earlier on and possibly inspired Griendel and even Huygens. Huygens is known to have studied samples of Wiesel's lens-making and instruments since 1653.

Wiesel made a ship's lantern around 1640 that has much in common with the magic lantern design that Griendel would later apply: a horizontal cylindrical body with a rosette chimney on top, a concave mirror behind a fixture for a candle or lamp inside and a biconvex lens at the front. There is no evidence that Wiesel actually ever made a magic lantern, but in 1674, his successor offered a variety of magic lanterns from the same workshop. This successor is thought to have only continued producing Wiesel's designs after his death in 1662, without adding anything new.

== Further history ==
=== Early adopters ===
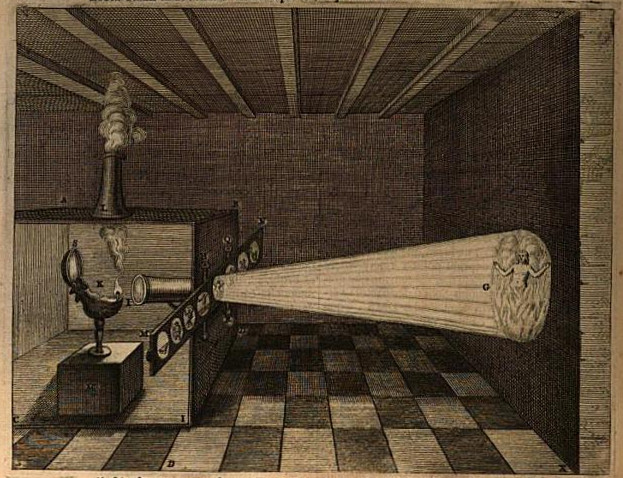
An illustration from Kircher's 1671 Ars Magna Lucis et Umbrae - projection of hellfire or purgatory

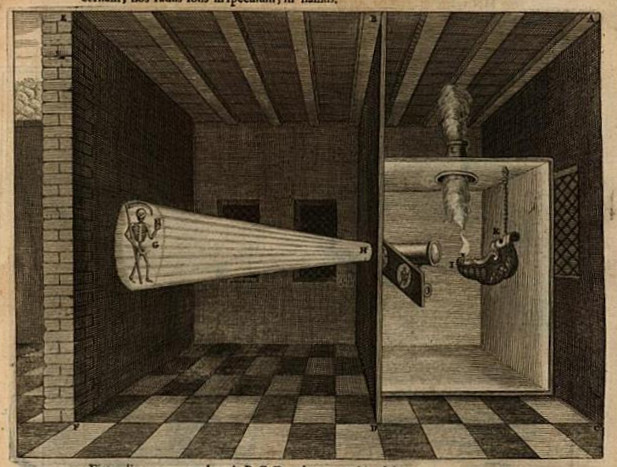
An illustration from Kircher's 1671 Ars Magna Lucis et Umbrae - projection of Death

Before 1671, only a small circle of people seemed to have knowledge of the magic lantern, and almost every known report of the device from this period had to do with people that were more or less directly connected to Christiaan Huygens. Despite the rejection expressed in his letters to his brother, Huygens must have familiarized several people with the lantern.

In 1664 Parisian engineer Pierre Petit wrote to Huygens to ask for some specifications of the lantern, because he was trying to construct one after seeing the lantern of "the dane", probably Walgensten. The lantern that Petit was constructing had a concave mirror behind the lamp. This directed more light through the lens, resulting in a brighter projection, and it would become a standard part of most of the lanterns that were made later. Petit may have copied it from Walgensten, but he expressed that he made a lamp stronger than any he had ever seen.

Starting in 1661, Huygens corresponded with London optical instrument-maker Richard Reeve. Reeve was soon selling magic lanterns, demonstrated one in his shop on 17 May 1663 to Balthasar de Monconys, and sold one to Samuel Pepys in August 1666.

One of Christiaan Huygens's contacts imagined how Athanasius Kircher would use the magic lantern: "If he would know about the invention of the Lantern he would surely frighten the cardinals with specters." Kircher eventually learnt about the existence of the magic lantern via Thomas Walgensten and introduced it as "Lucerna Magica" in the widespread 1671 second edition of his book Ars Magna Lucis et Umbrae.

Kircher claimed that Thomas Walgensten reworked his ideas from the previous edition of this book into a better lantern. Kircher described this improved lantern, but it was illustrated in a confusing manner: the pictures seem technically incorrect—with both the projected image and the transparencies (H) shown upright (while the text states that they should be inverted), the hollow mirror is too high in one picture and absent in the other, and the lens (I) is at the wrong side of the slide. However, experiments with a construction as illustrated in Kircher's book proved that it could work as a point light-source projection system.

The projected image in one of the illustrations shows a person in purgatory or hellfire and the other depicts Death with a scythe and an hourglass. According to legend, Kircher secretly used the lantern at night to project the image of Death on windows of apostates to scare them back into church. Kircher suggested in his book that an audience would be more astonished by the sudden appearance of images if the lantern was hidden in a separate room, so the audience would be ignorant of the cause of their appearance.

=== Educational use and other subjects ===
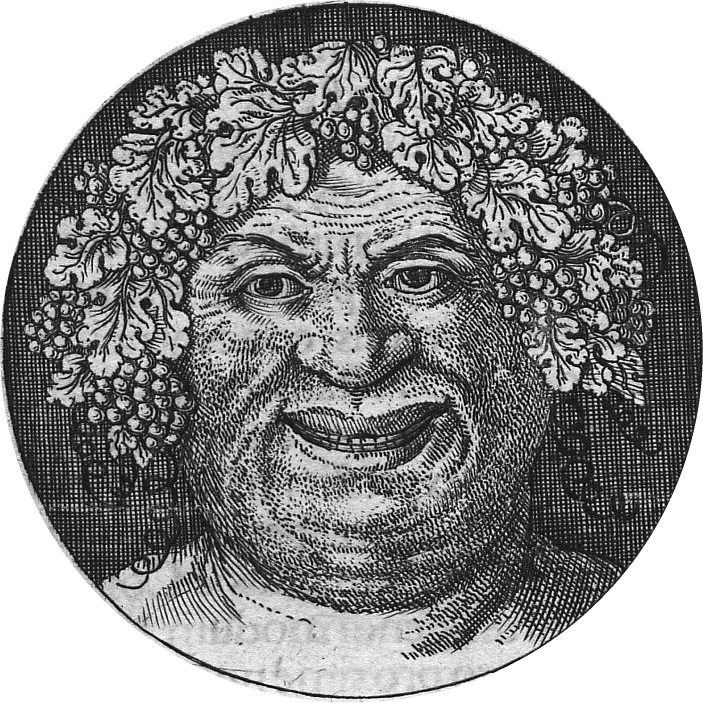
An illustration of a lantern slide depicting Bacchus in Sturm's Collegium experimentale sive curiosum (1677)

The earliest reports and illustrations of lantern projections suggest that they were all intended to scare the audience. Pierre Petit called the apparatus "lanterne de peur" (lantern of fear) in his 1664 letter to Huygens. Surviving lantern plates and descriptions from the next decades prove that the new medium was not just used for horror shows, but that many kinds of subjects were projected. Griendel did not mention scary pictures when he described the magic lantern to Gottfried Wilhelm Leibniz in December 1671: "An optical lantern which presents everything that one desires, figures, paintings, portraits, faces, hunts, even an entire comedy with all its lively colours."

In 1675, Leibniz saw an important role for the magic lantern in his plan for a kind of world exhibition with projections of "attempts at flight, artistic meteors, optical effects, representations of the sky with the star and comets, and a model of the earth (...), fireworks, water fountains, and ships in rare forms; then mandrakes and other rare plants and exotic animals." In 1685–1686, Johannes Zahn was an early advocate for use of the device for educational purposes: detailed anatomical illustrations were difficult to draw on a chalkboard, but could easily be copied onto glass or mica.

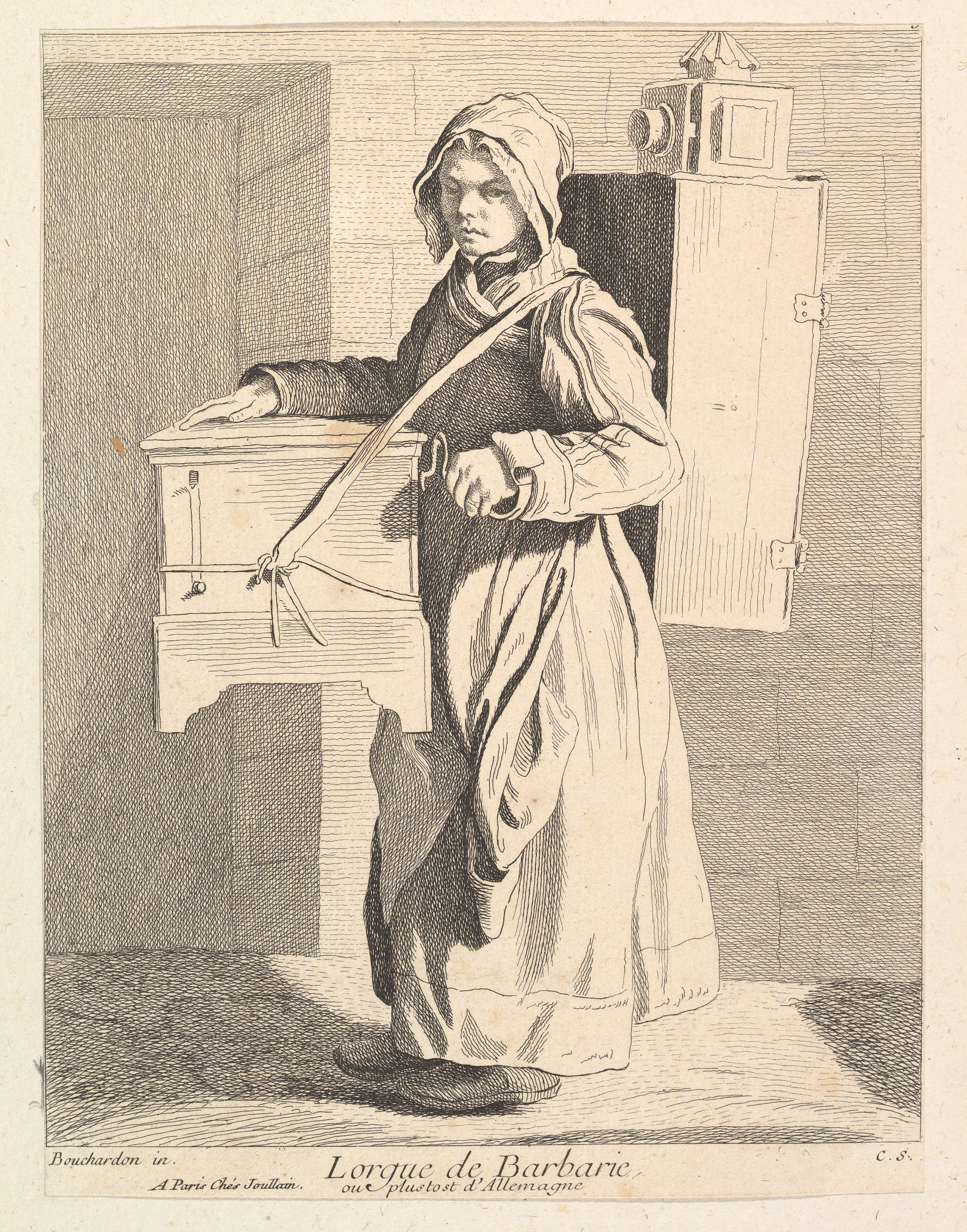
A 1737 etching/engraving of an organ grinder with a magic lantern on her back by Anne Claude de Caylus, after Edme Bouchardon

In the 1730s, the use of magic lanterns started to become more widespread when travelling showmen, conjurers and storytellers added them to their repertoire. The travelling lanternists were often called Savoyards (they supposedly came from the Savoy region in France) and became a common sight in many European cities.

In France in the 1770s François Dominique Séraphin used magic lanterns to perform his "Ombres Chinoises" (Chinese shadows), a form of shadow play.

Magic lanterns became a staple of science lecturing and museum events since Scottish lecturer Henry Moyes's tour of America in 1785–86, when he recommended that all college laboratories procure one. French writer and educator Stéphanie Félicité, comtesse de Genlis popularized the use of magic lanterns as an educational tool in the late 18th century, when using projected images of plants to teach botany. Her educational methods were published in America in English translation in the early 1820s. A type of lantern was constructed by Moses Holden between 1814 and 1815 for illustrating his astronomical lectures.

=== Mass slide production ===
In 1821, Philip Carpenter's London company, which became Carpenter and Westley after his death, started manufacturing a sturdy but lightweight and transportable "Phantasmagoria lantern" with an Argand style lamp. It produced high quality projections and was suitable for classrooms. Carpenter also developed a "secret" copper plate printing/burning process to mass-produce glass lantern slides with printed outlines, which were then easily and quickly hand painted ready for sale.

These "copper-plate sliders" contained three or four very detailed 4" circular images mounted in thin hardwood frames. The first known set The Elements of Zoology became available in 1823, with over 200 images in 56 frames of zoological figures, classified according to the system of the Swedish scientist Carl Linnaeus.

In 1823, many other slides appeared in the company's catalogue: "The Kings and Queens of England" (9 sliders taken from David Hume's History of England), "Astronomical Diagrams and Constellations" (9 sliders taken from Friedrich Wilhelm Herschel's textbooks), "Views and Buildings", Ancient and Modern Costume (62 sliders from various sources). Fifteen sliders of the category "Humorous" provided some entertainment, but the focus on education was obvious and very successful.

In the mid-19th century, the market for magic lanterns was concentrated in Europe, with production primarily in Italy, France, and England. In 1848, a New York optician began advertising imported slides and locally produced magic lanterns. By 1860, mass production began to make magic lanterns more widely available and affordable, with much of the production in the latter half of the 19th century concentrated in Germany. These smaller lanterns had smaller glass sliders, which instead of wooden frames usually had colorful strips of paper glued around their edges with the images printed directly on the glass.

=== Waning popularity ===
The popularity of magic lanterns waned after the introduction of movies in the 1890s, but they remained a common medium until slide projectors became widespread during the 1950s.

== Moving images ==
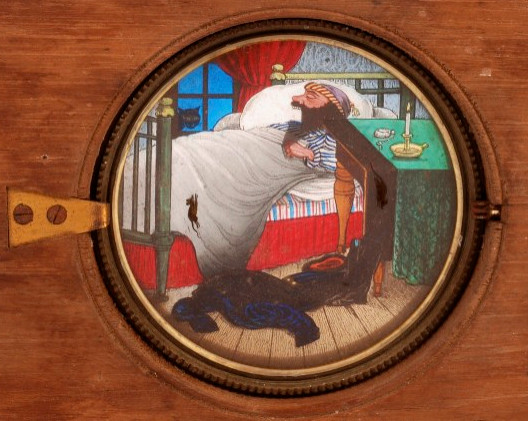
Mice jump into the mouth of a sleeping bearded man on a popular mechanical slide from circa 1870.

The magic lantern was not only a direct ancestor of the motion picture projector as a means for visual storytelling, but it could itself be used to project moving images. Some suggestion of movement could be achieved by alternating between pictures of different phases of a motion, but most magic lantern "animations" used two glass slides projected together—one with the stationary part of the picture and the other with the part that could be set in motion by hand or by a simple mechanism.

Motion in animated slides was mostly limited to either two phases of a movement or transformation, or a more gradual singular movement (e.g., a train passing through a landscape). These limitations made subjects with repetitive movements popular, like the sails on a windmill turning around or children on a seesaw. Movements could be repeated over and over and could be performed at different speeds. A common technique that is comparable to the effect of a panning camera makes use of a long slide that is simply pulled slowly through the lantern and usually shows a landscape, sometimes with several phases of a story within the continuous backdrop.

Movement of projected images was also possible by moving the magic lantern itself. This became a staple technique in phantasmagoria shows in the late 18th century, often with the lantern sliding on rails or riding on small wheels and hidden from the view of the audience behind the projection screen.

=== History ===
In 1645, Kircher had already suggested projecting live insects and shadow puppets from the surface of the mirror in his Steganographic system to perform dramatic scenes.

Christiaan Huygens's 1659 sketches (see above) suggest he intended to animate the skeleton to have it take off its head and place it back on its neck. This can be seen as an indication that the very first magic lantern demonstrations may already have included projections of simple animations.

In 1668, Robert Hooke wrote about the effects of a type of magic lantern installation: "Spectators not well versed in optics, that should see the various apparitions and disappearances, the motions, changes and actions that may this way be represented, would readily believe them to be supernatural and miraculous." In the same year, Francesco Eschinardi published Centuriae opticae pars altera seu dialogi optici pars tertia, which included a detailed description of the construction of the magic lantern.

In 1675, German polymath and philosopher Gottfried Wilhelm Leibniz proposed a kind of world exhibition that would show all types of new inventions and spectacles. In a handwritten document he supposed it should open and close with magic lantern shows, including subjects "which can be dismembered, to represent quite extraordinary and grotesque movements, which men would not be capable of making" (translated from French).

Several reports of early magic lantern screenings possibly described moving pictures, but are not clear enough to conclude whether the viewers saw animated slides or motion depicted in still images.

In 1698, German engraver and publisher Johann Christoph Weigel described several lantern slides with mechanisms that made glass parts move over one fixed glass slide, for instance by the means of a silk thread, or grooves in which the mobile part slides.

In 1709, a German optician and glass grinder named Themme (or Temme) made moving lantern slides, including a carriage with rotating wheels, a cupid with a spinning wheel, a shooting gun, and falling bombs. Wheels were cut from the glass plate with a diamond and rotated by a thread that was spun around small brass wheels attached to the glass wheels. A paper slip mask would be quickly pulled away to reveal the red fiery discharge and the bullet from a shooting gun. Zacharias Conrad von Uffenbach visited Themme's shop and liked the effects, but was disappointed about the very simple mechanisms. Nonetheless, he bought seven moving slides, as well as twelve slides with four pictures each, which he thought were delicately painted.

Several types of mechanical slides were described and illustrated in Dutch professor of mathematics, physics, philosophy, medicine, and astronomy Pieter van Musschenbroek's second edition (1739) of Beginsels Der Natuurkunde (see illustration below). Pieter was the brother of Jan van Musschenbroek, the maker of an outstanding magic lantern with excellent lenses and a diaphragm (see illustration above).

In 1770, Edmé-Gilles Guyot described a method of using two slides for the depiction of a storm at sea, with waves on one slide and ships and a few clouds on another. Lanternists could project the illusion of mild waves turning into a wild sea tossing the ships around by increasing the movement of the separate slides. Guyot also detailed how projection on smoke could be used to create the illusion of ghosts hovering in the air, which would become a technique commonly used in phantasmagoria.

An especially intricate multiple rackwork mechanism was developed to show the movements of the planets (sometimes accompanied by revolving satellites) revolving around the Sun. In 1795, one M. Dicas offered an early magic lantern system, the Lucernal or Portable Eidouranian, that showed the orbiting planets. From around the 1820s mechanical astronomical slides became quite common.

=== Types of mechanical slides ===
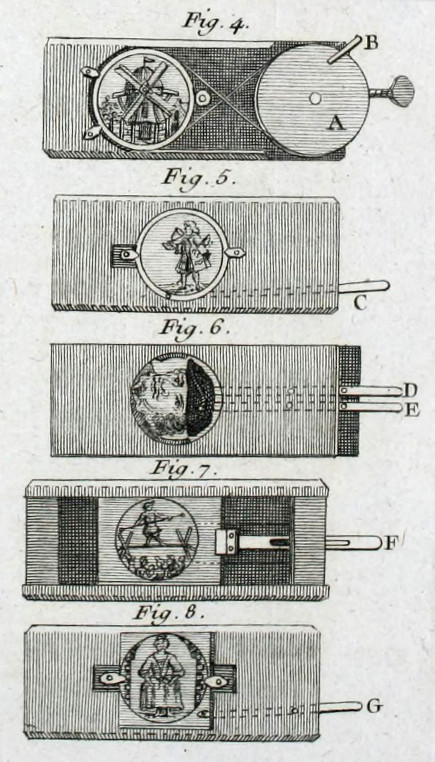
Mechanical slides for a magic lantern as illustrated in Petrus van Musschenbroek's Beginsels Der Natuurkunde, second edition, 1739

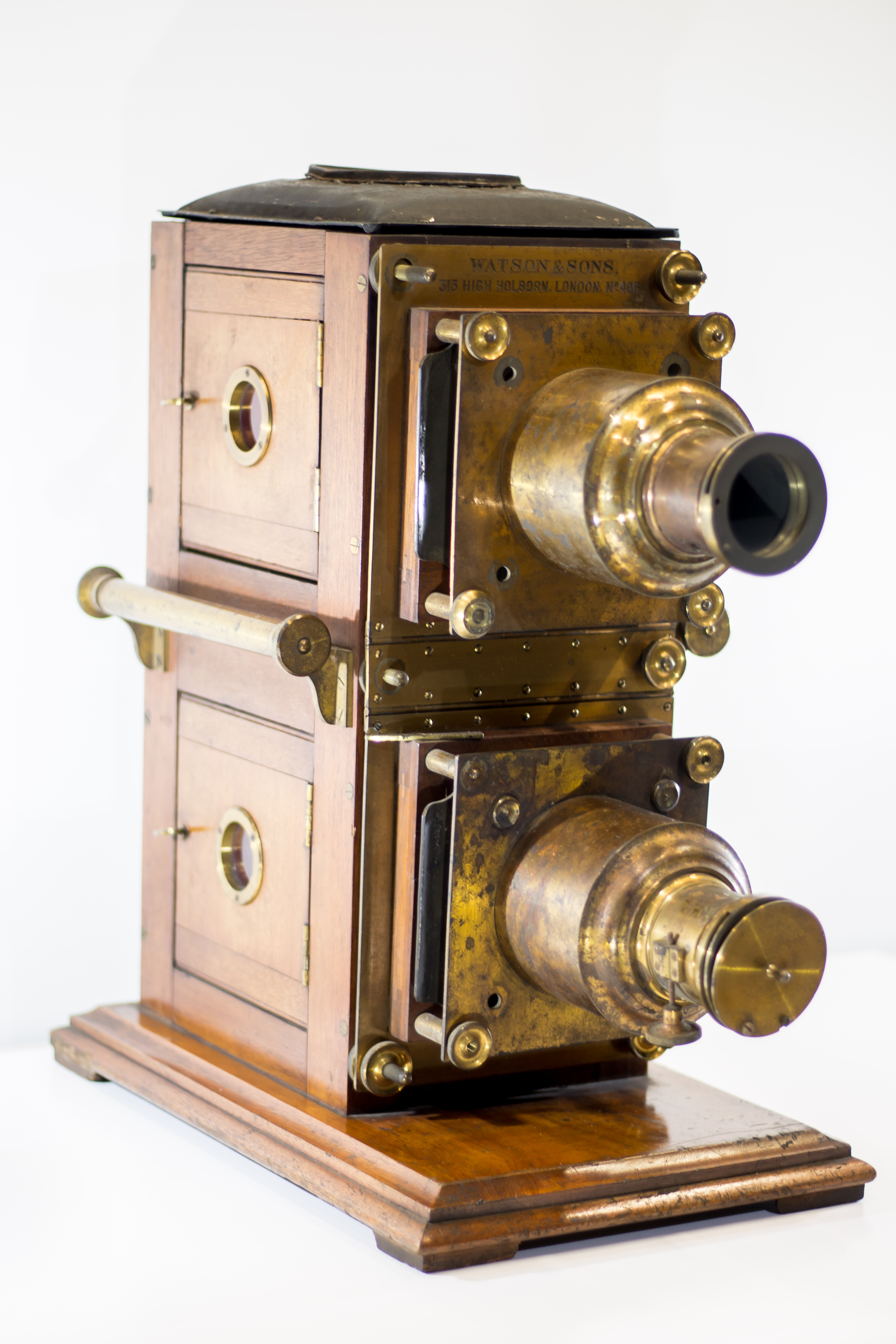
A stereopticon magic lantern

Various types of mechanisms were commonly used to add movement to the projected image:

- Slipping slides: a movable glass plate with one or more figures (or any part of a picture for which movement was desired) was slipped over a stationary one, directly by hand or with a small drawbar (see: Fig. 7 on the illustration by Petrus van Musschenbroek: a tightrope walker sliding across the rope). A common example showed a creature that could move the pupils in its eyes, as if looking in all directions. A long piece of glass could show a procession of figures, or a train with several wagons. Quite convincing illusions of moving waves on a sea or lake have also been achieved with this method.
- Slipping slides with masking: black paint on portions of the moving plate would mask parts of the underlying image—with a black background—on the stationary glass. This made it possible to hide and then reveal the previous position of a part, for instance a limb, to suggest repetitious movement. The suggested movement would be rather jerky and usually operated quickly. Masking in slides was also often used to create change rather than movement (see: Fig. 6 on the illustration by Petrus van Musschenbroek: a man, his wig and his hat): for instance a person's head could be replaced with that of an animal. More gradual and natural movement was also possible; for instance to make a nose grow very long by slowly moving a masking glass.
- Lever slides: the moving part was operated by a lever. These could show a more natural movement than slipping slides and were mostly used for repetitive movements, for instance a woodcutter raising and lowering his axe, or a girl on a swing. (see: Fig. 5 on the illustration by Petrus van Musschenbroek: a drinking man raising and lowering his glass + Fig. 8: a lady curtsying)
- Pulley slides: a pulley rotates the moving part and could for instance be used to turn the sails on a windmill. (see: fig. 4 on illustration by Van Musschenbroek)
- Rack and pinion slides: turning the handle of a rackwork would rotate or lift the moving part and could for instance be used to turn the sails on a windmill or for having a hot air balloon take off and descend. A more complex astronomical rackwork slide showed the planets and their satellites orbiting around the sun.
- Fantoccini slides: jointed figures set in motion by levers, thin rods, or cams and worm wheels. A popular version had a somersaulting monkey with arms attached to mechanism that made it tumble with dangling feet. Named after the Italian word for animated puppets, like marionettes or jumping jacks. Two different British patents for slides with moving jointed figures were granted in 1891.
- Snow effect slide: can add snow to another slide (preferably of a winter scene) by moving a flexible loop of material pierced with tiny holes in front of one of the lenses of a double or triple lantern.

Mechanical slides with abstract special effects include:

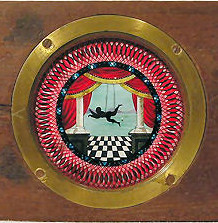
A slide with a fantoccini trapeze artist and a chromatrope border design (c. 1880)

- Chromatrope: a slide that produces dazzling colorful geometrical patterns by rotating two painted glass discs in opposite directions, originally with a double pulley mechanism but later usually with a rackwork mechanism. It was possibly invented around 1844 by English glass painter and showman Henry Langdon Childe and soon added as a novelty to the program of the Royal Polytechnic Institution.
- Astrometeoroscope or Astrometroscope: a large slide that projected a lacework of dots forming constantly changing geometrical line patterns, compared with stars and meteors. It was invented in or before 1858 by the Hungarian engineer S. Pilcher and used a very ingenious mechanism with two metal plates obliquely crossed with slits that moved to and fro in contrary directions. Except for when the only known example was used in a performance, it was kept locked away at the Polytechnic so no one could discover the secret technique. When the Polytechnic auctioned the device, Picher eventually paid an extravagant price for his own invention to keep its workings secret.
- Eidotrope: counter-rotating discs of perforated metal or card (or wire gauze or lace), producing swirling Moiré patterns of bright white dots. It was invented by English scientist Charles Wheatstone in 1866.
- Kaleidotrope: a slide with a single perforated metal or cardboard disc suspended on a spiral spring. The holes can be tinted with colored pieces of gelatin. When struck the disc's vibration and rotation sends the colored dots of light swirling around in all sorts of shapes and patterns. The device was demonstrated at the Royal Polytechnic Institution around 1870 and dubbed "Kaleidotrope" when commercial versions were marketed.
- Cycloidotrope (circa 1865): a slide with an adjustable stylus bar for drawing geometric patterns on sooty glass when hand cranked during projection. The patterns are similar to that produced with a Spirograph.
- Newton colour wheel: a slide that, when spinning fast enough, blends seven colours into a white circle

=== Dissolving views ===
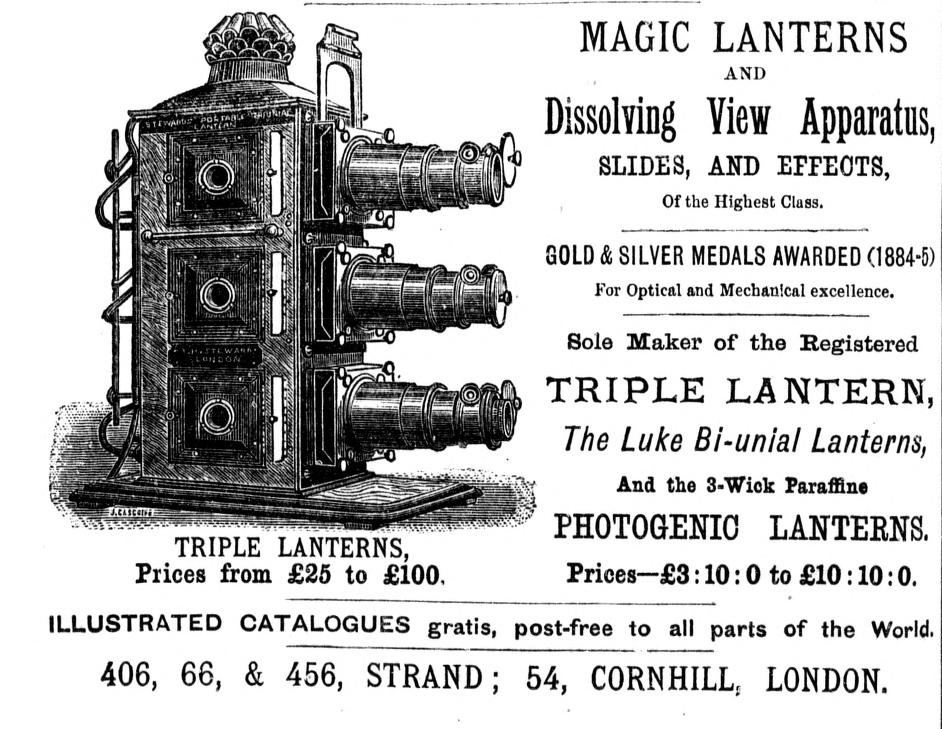
An advertisement with a picture of a triple lantern / dissolving view apparatus (1886)

The effect of a gradual transition from one image to another, known as a dissolve in modern filmmaking, became the basis of a popular type of magic lantern show in England in the 19th century. Typical dissolving views showed landscapes dissolving from day to night or from summer to winter. This was achieved by aligning the projection of two matching images and slowly diminishing the first image while introducing the second image. The subject and the effect of magic lantern dissolving views is similar to the popular Diorama theatre paintings that originated in Paris in 1822. 19th century magic lantern broadsides often used the terms dissolving view, dioramic view, or simply diorama interchangeably.

The effect was reportedly invented by phantasmagoria pioneer Paul de Philipsthal while in Ireland in 1803 or 1804. He thought of using two lanterns to make the spirit of Samuel appear out of a mist in his representation of the Witch of Endor. While working out the desired effect, he got the idea of using the technique with landscapes. An 1812 newspaper about a London performance indicates that De Philipsthal presented what was possibly a relatively early incarnation of a dissolving views show, describing it as "a series of landscapes (in imitation of moonlight), which insensibly change to various scenes producing a very magical effect."

Another possible inventor is Henry Langdon Childe, who purportedly once worked for De Philipsthal. He is said to have invented the dissolving views in 1807, and to have improved and completed the technique in 1818. The oldest known use of the term "dissolving views" occurs on playbills for Childe's shows at the Adelphi Theatre in London in 1837. Childe further popularized the dissolving views at the Royal Polytechnic Institution in the early 1840s.

Despite later reports about the early invention, and apart from De Philipsthal's 1812 performance, no reports of dissolving view shows before the 1820s are known. Some cases may involve confusion with the Diorama or similar media. In 1826, Scottish magician and ventriloquist M. Henry introduced what he described as "beautiful dissolvent scenes", "imperceptibly changing views", "dissolvent views", and "Magic Views"—created "by Machinery invented by M. Henry."

In 1827, Henry Langdon Childe presented "Scenic Views, showing the various effects of light and shade," with a series of subjects that became classics for the dissolving views. In December 1827, De Philipsthal returned with a show that included "various splendid views (...) transforming themselves imperceptibly (as if it were by Magic) from one form into another."

Biunial lanterns, with two projecting optical sets in one apparatus, were produced to more easily project dissolving views. Possibly the first horizontal biunial lantern, dubbed the "Biscenascope" was made by the optician Mr. Clarke and presented at the Royal Adelaide Gallery in London on 5 December 1840. The earliest known illustration of a vertical biunial lantern, probably provided by E.G. Wood, appeared in the Horne & Thornthwaite catalogue in 1857. Later on triple lanterns enabled additional effects, for instance the effect of snow falling while a green landscape dissolves into a snowy winter version.

A mechanical device could be fitted on the magic lantern, which locked up a diaphragm on the first slide slowly whilst a diaphragm on a second slide opened simultaneously.

Philip Carpenter's copper-plate printing process, introduced in 1823, may have made it much easier to create duplicate slides with printed outlines that could then be colored differently to create dissolving view slides. However, all early dissolving view slides seem to have been hand-painted.

=== Experiments ===
There have been many different experiments involving sorts of movement with the magic lantern. These include:

- Galvanometer slide: a flattened coil with a magnetized needle moving from side to side when a battery is connected.
- Representation of Luigi Galvani's frog legs: a projection of moving frog legs, with the nerves and muscles of severed frog legs connected to electric wires.
- Hour-glass projection: the projection of a flattened hourglass showed the sand flowing upwards. Extreme magnification made the effect extra impressive, with the grains of sand forming a wave-like pattern.
- Cohesion figure projection of liquids: different oils and fats create many kinds of moving patterns when manipulated between clear glass plates or a narrow glass box.

Several of these experiments were publicly demonstrated at the Royal Polytechnic Institution.

=== Choreutoscope and phenakistiscope-type systems ===
Versions of the magic lantern were used to project transparent variations of the phénakisticope. These were adapted with a mechanism that spins the disc and a shutter system. Duboscq produced some in the 1850s and Thomas Ross patented a version called "Wheel of life" in 1869 and 1870.

The Choreutoscope was purportedly invented around 1866 by the Greenwich engineer John Beale, and demonstrated at the Royal Polytechnic. It projected six pictures and used a hand-cranked mechanism for intermittent movement and synchronized shutter action. The mechanism became a key to the development of the movie camera and projector. The Choreutoscope was used at the first professional public demonstration of the Kinetoscope to explain its principles.

An "Optical Instrument" was patented in the U.S. in 1869 by O.B. Brown, using a phenakistiscope-like disc with a technique very close to the later cinematograph; with Maltese Cross motion; a star-wheel and pin being used for intermittent motion, and a two-sector shutter.

=== Life in the lantern - Bio-Phantoscope ===
John Arthur Roebuck Rudge built a lantern for William Friese-Greene with a mechanism to project a sequence of seven photographic slides. Reports say it was made in 1872, but also 1875 and most likely 1882. The surviving slides show a man removing his head with his hands and raising the loose head. The photographed body belonged to Rudge and Friese-Greene posed for the head. The slides probably provided the very first trick photography sequence projection. Friese-Greene demonstrated the machine in his shop, until the police ordered him to remove it when it attracted too large a crowd.

== Phantasmagoria ==
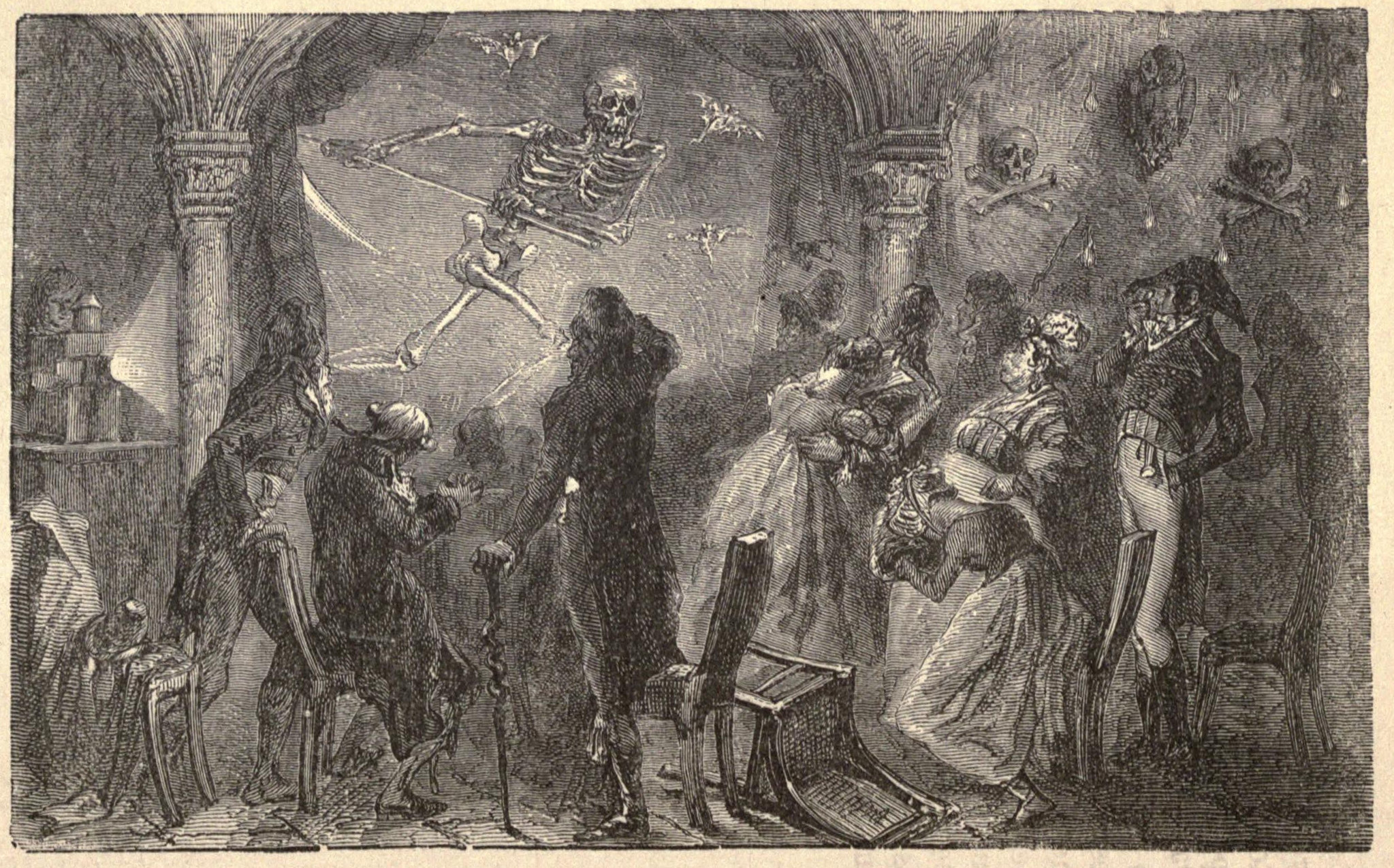
An interpretation of Robertson's Fantasmagorie from F. Marion's L'Optique (1867)

Phantasmagoria was a form of horror theater that used one or more magic lanterns to project frightening images, especially of ghosts. Showmen used rear projection, mobile or portable projectors and a variety of effects to produce convincing necromantic experiences. It was very popular in Europe from the late 18th century to well into the 19th century.

It is thought that optical devices like concave mirrors and the camera obscura have been used since antiquity to fool spectators into believing they saw real gods and spirits. The magician "physicist" Phylidor created what must have been the first true phantasmagoria show. He probably used mobile magic lanterns with the recently invented Argand lamp to create his successful Schröpferischen, und Cagliostoischen Geister-Erscheinungen (Schröpfer-esque and Cagiostro-esque Ghost Apparitions) in Vienna from 1790 to 1792.

Phylidor stated that his show of perfected apparitions revealed how charlatans like Johann Georg Schröpfer and Cagliostro had fooled their audiences. As "Paul Filidort," he presented his Phantasmagorie in Paris From December 1792 to July 1793, probably using that term for the first time. As "Paul de Philipsthal," he performed Phantasmagoria shows in Britain, beginning in 1801 with great success.

One of many showmen who were inspired by Phylidor, Etienne-Gaspard Robert became very famous with his own Fantasmagorie show in Paris from 1798 to 1803. He later performed throughout Europe and returned to Paris for a triumphant comeback in 1814. He patented a mobile "Fantascope" lantern in 1798.

== Royal Polytechnic Institution shows ==
When it opened in 1838, The Royal Polytechnic Institution in London became a very popular and influential venue with many kinds of magic lantern shows as an important part of its program. At the main theatre, with 500 seats, lanternists would make good use of a battery of six large lanterns running on tracked tables to project the finely detailed images of extra large slides on the 648 square feet screen. The magic lantern was used to illustrate lectures, concerts, pantomimes and other forms of theatre. Popular magic lantern presentations included Henry Langdon Childe's dissolving views, his chromatrope, phantasmagoria, and mechanical slides.

== Utsushi-e ==
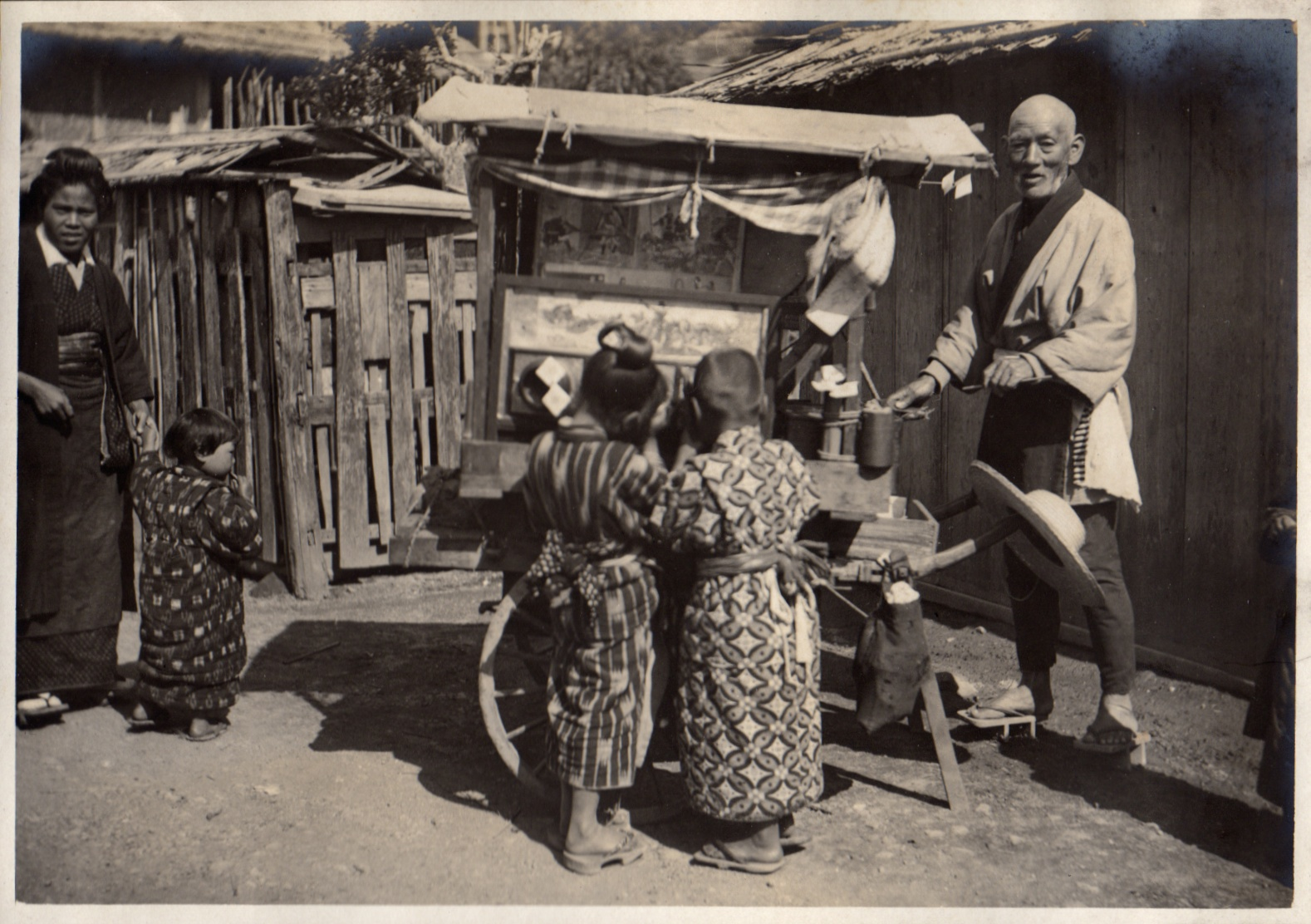
A street cart with a magic lantern. Japan, 1915

Utsushi-e is a type of magic lantern show that became popular in Japan in the 19th century. The Dutch probably introduced the magic lantern in Japan before the 1760s. A new style for magic lantern shows was introduced by Kameya Toraku I, who first performed in 1803 in Edo. Possibly the phantasmagoria shows, popular in the west at that moment, inspired the rear projection technique, moving images and ghost stories. Japanese showmen developed lightweight wooden projectors (furo) that were handheld so that several performers could make the projections of different colourful figures move around the screen at the same time. The Western techniques of mechanical slides were combined with traditional Japanese skills—especially from Karakuri puppets—to further animate the figures and for special effects.

== Today ==
Some enthusiasts claim that the brilliant quality of color in lantern slides is unsurpassed by successive projection media. The magic lantern and lantern slides are still popular with collectors and can be found in many museums like, for example, in the Museum of Precinema in Padua, where 60 magic lanterns and more than 10,000 original slides are preserved. Of the original lanterns from the first 150 years after its invention, only 28 are known to still exist, as of 2009. Because the original slides are fragile, rather than display or project them, museums often digitize the slides for exhibition.

A collaborative research project of several European universities called A Million Pictures ran from June 2015 to May 2018. It addresses the sustainable preservation of the massive, untapped heritage resource of the tens of thousands of lantern slides in the collections of libraries and museums across Europe.

Magic lantern images by Theodore Green, from the Royal Albert Memorial Museum.

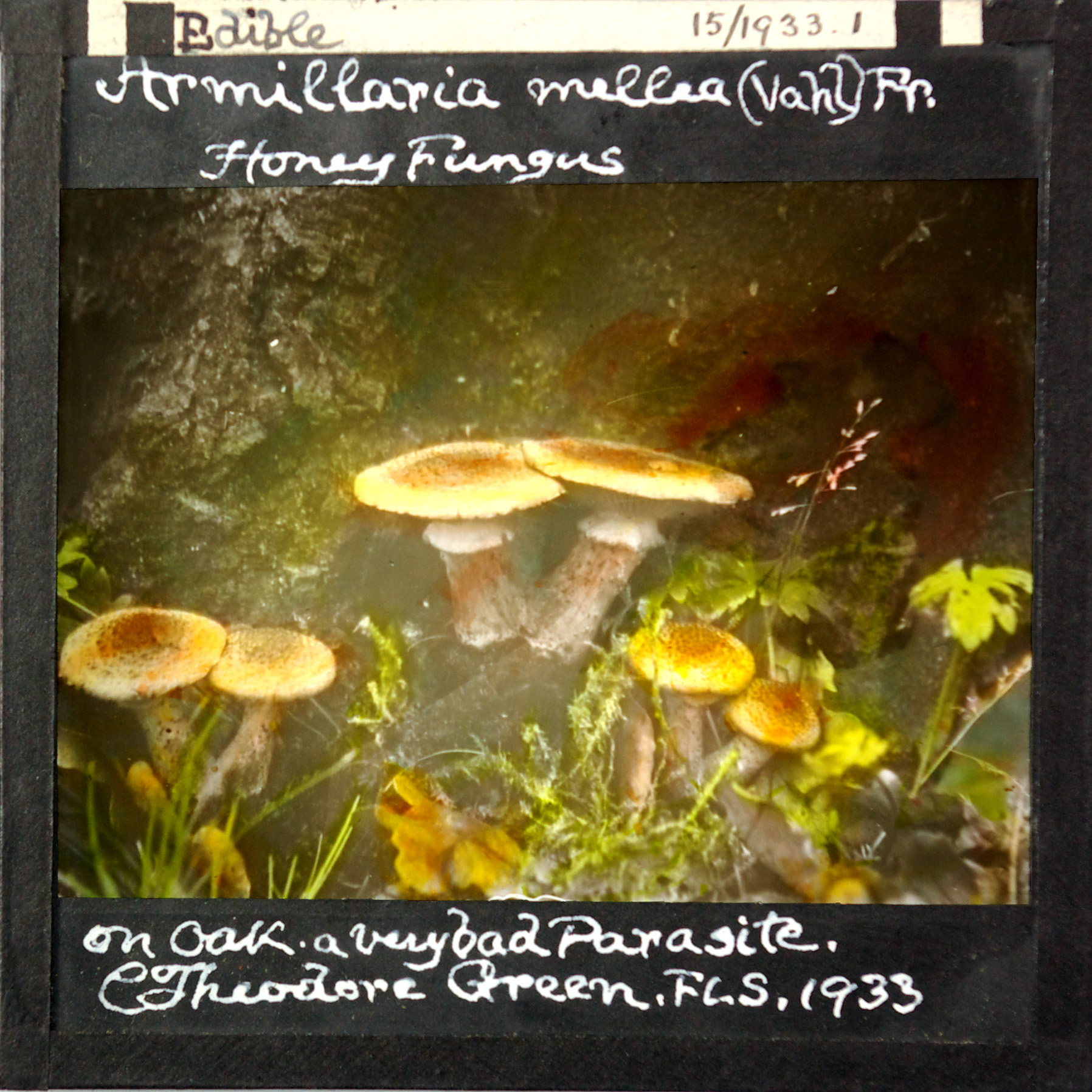
Armillaria melea

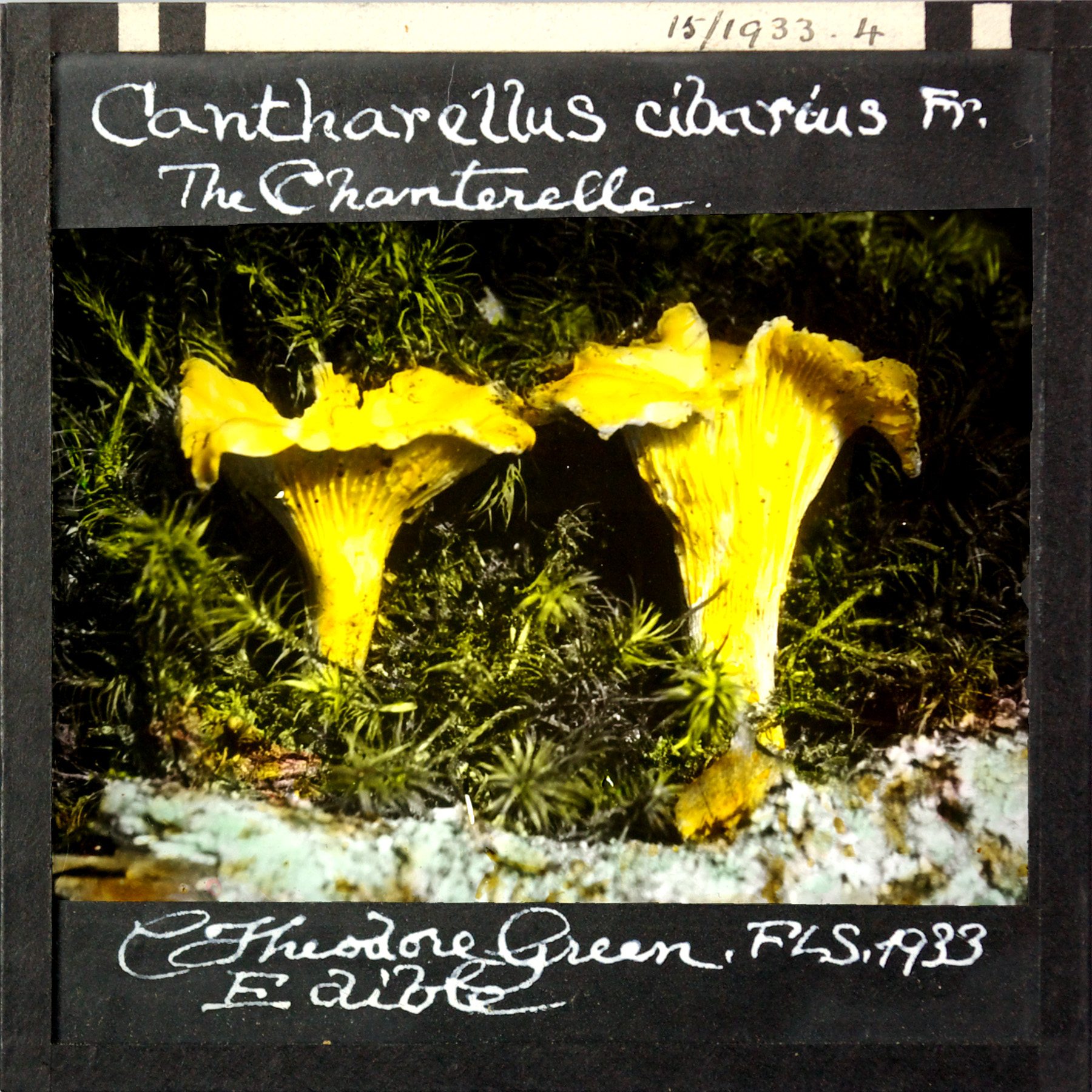
Cantharellus cibarius

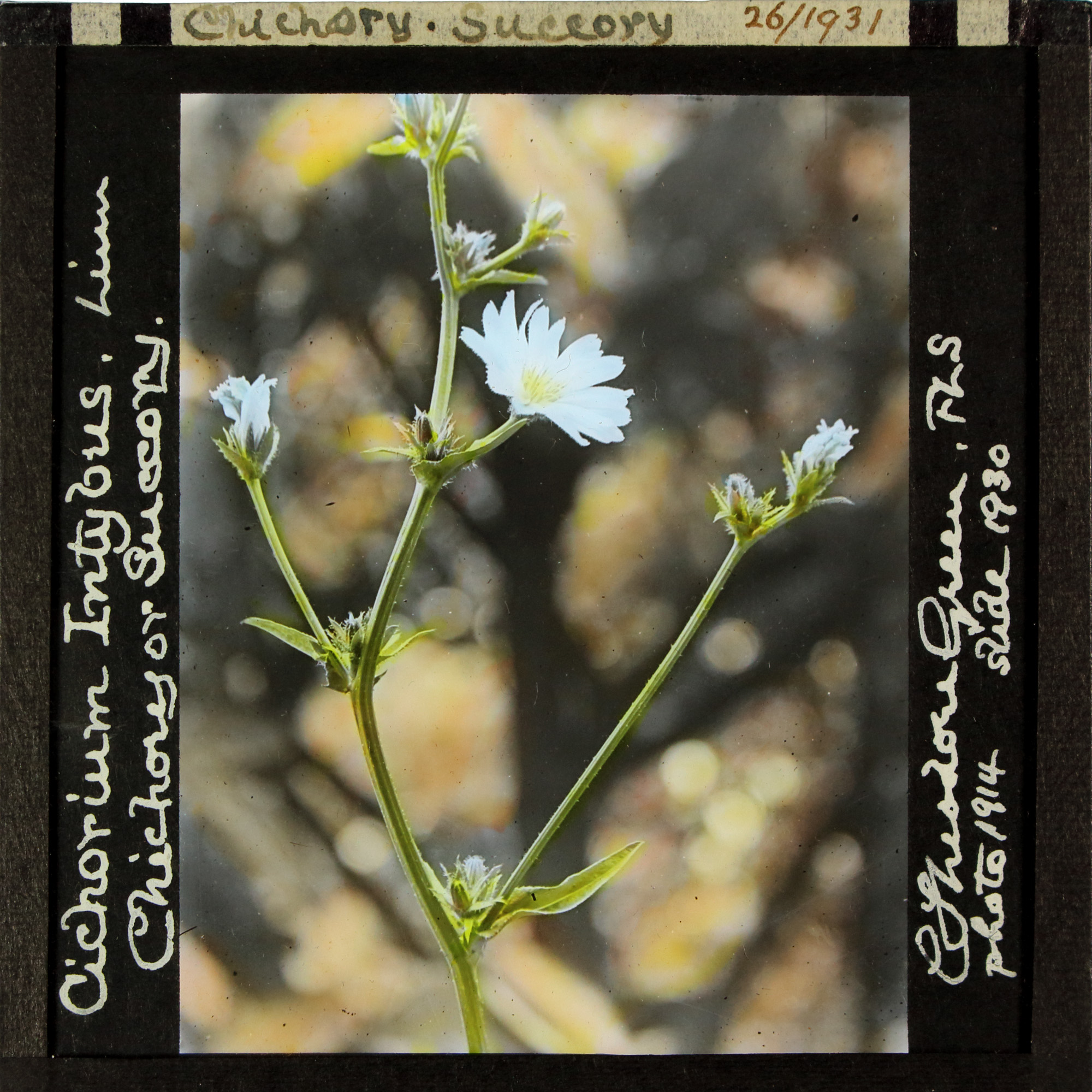
Chichorium intybus

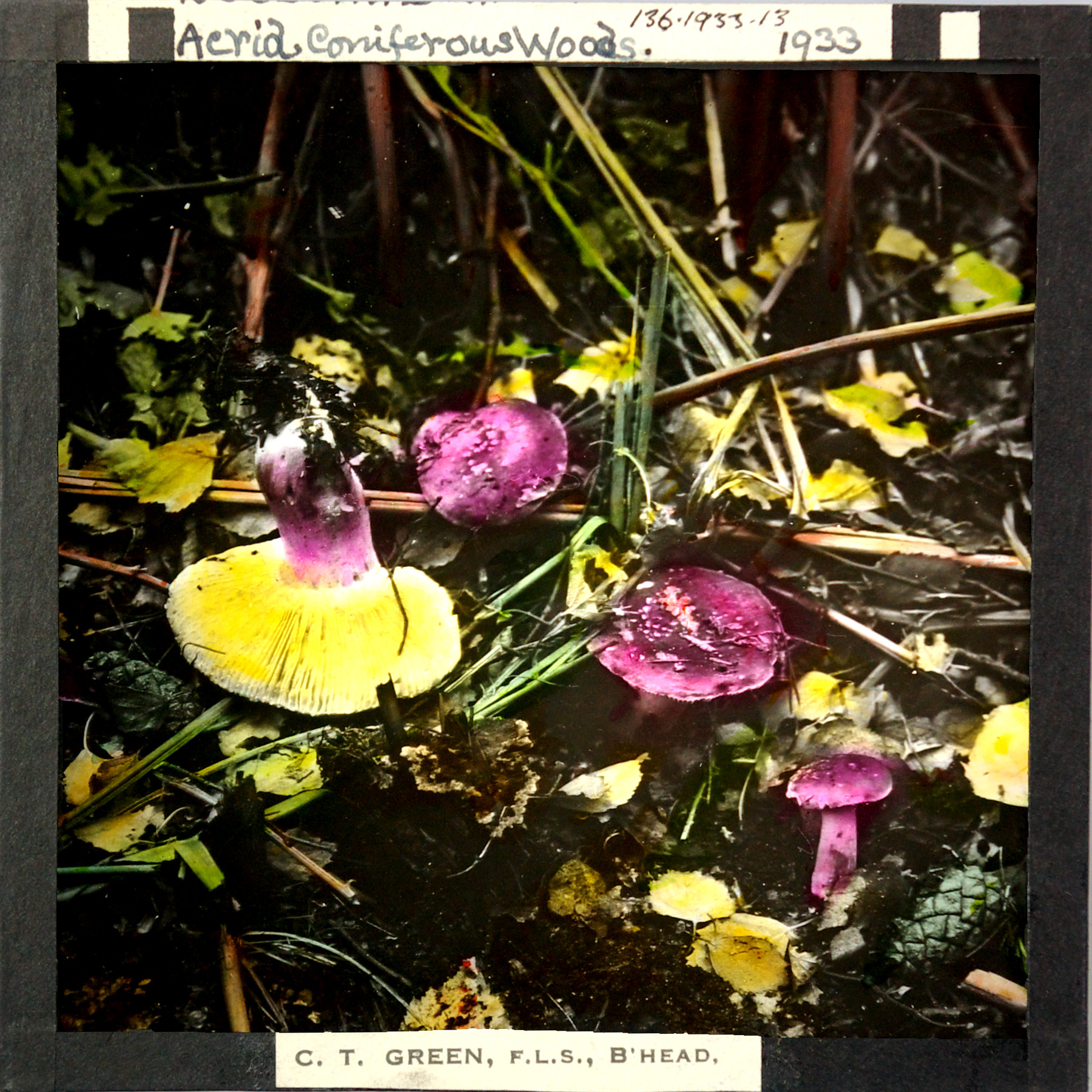
Russell drimeia

Genuine public lantern shows are relatively rare. Several regular performers claim they are the only one of their kind in their part of the world. These include Pierre Albanese and glass harmonica player Thomas Bloch live Magic Lantern/Phantasmagoria shows since 2008 in Europe and The American Magic-Lantern Theater. The Magic Lantern Society maintains a list of active lanternists, which contains more than 20 performers in the U.K. and around eight performers in other parts of the world, including Europe, U.S., Canada, Australia and New Zealand.

Dutch theatre group Lichtbende produces contemporary magical light spectacles and workshops with magic lanterns.

== See also ==
- List of lantern slide collections
- Projector (disambiguation)
- Zoopraxiscope
- Catadioptric telescope
- Henry Underhill (1855–1920), magic lantern lecturer
