= Kaleidoscope =

Optical instrument to view patterns due to repeated reflection

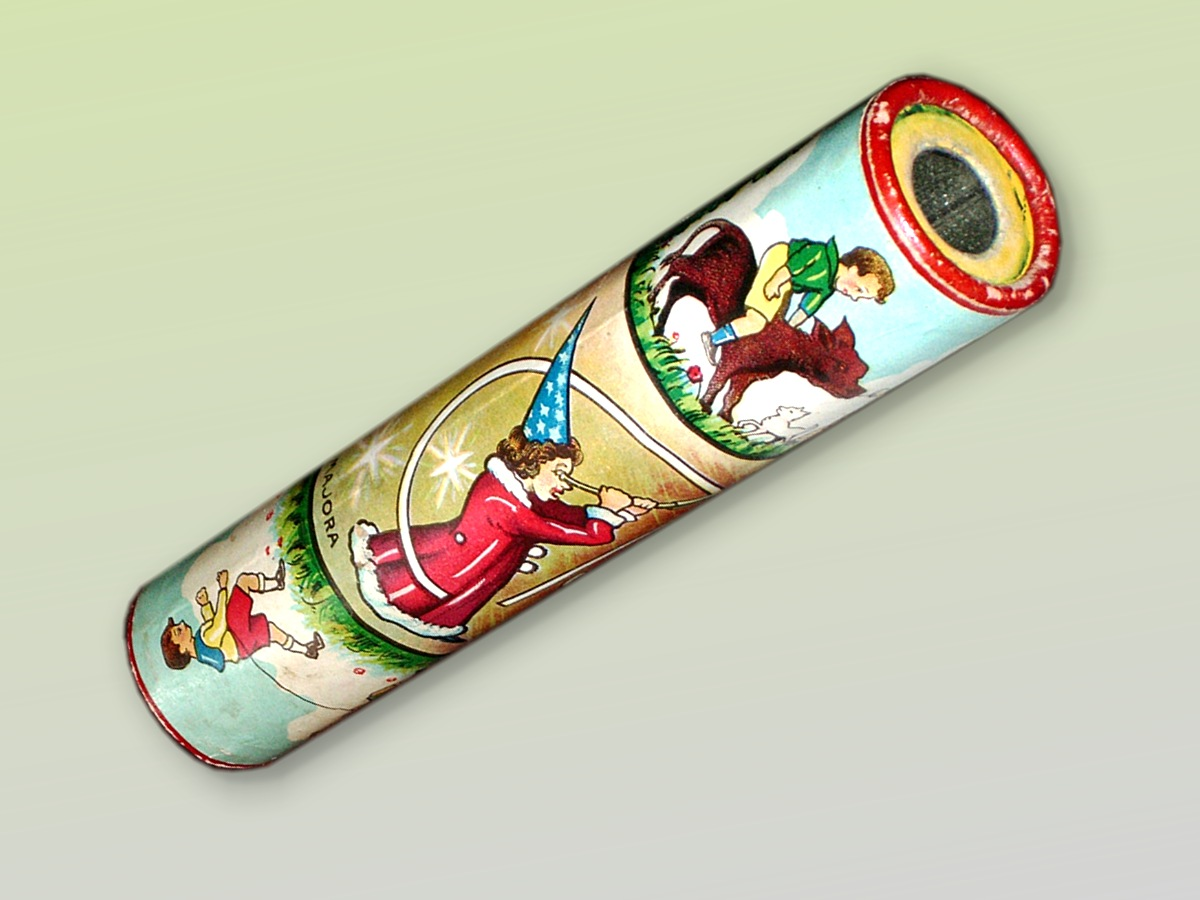
A toy kaleidoscope

A kaleidoscope (/kəˈlaɪdəskoʊp/) is an optical instrument with two or more reflecting surfaces (or mirrors) tilted to each other at an angle, so that one or more (parts of) objects on one end of these mirrors are shown as a symmetrical pattern when viewed from the other end, due to repeated reflection. These reflectors are often enclosed in a tube, usually containing on one end a cell with loose, colored pieces of glass or other transparent (and/or opaque) materials to be reflected into the viewed pattern. Rotation of the cell causes motion of the materials, resulting in an ever-changing view being presented.

Internal structure of a typical kaleidoscope

== Etymology ==
The term "kaleidoscope" was coined by its Scottish inventor David Brewster. It is derived from the Ancient Greek word καλός (kalos), "beautiful, beauty", εἶδος (eidos), "form, appearance" and σκοπέω (skopeō), "to look, to examine", hence "observation of beautiful forms". It was first published in the patent that was granted on July 10, 1817.

== History ==
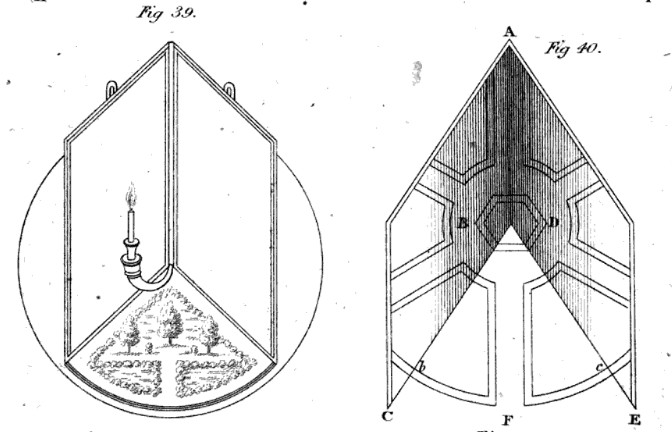
A comparison of the mirror constructions of Kircher (left) and Bradley (right)

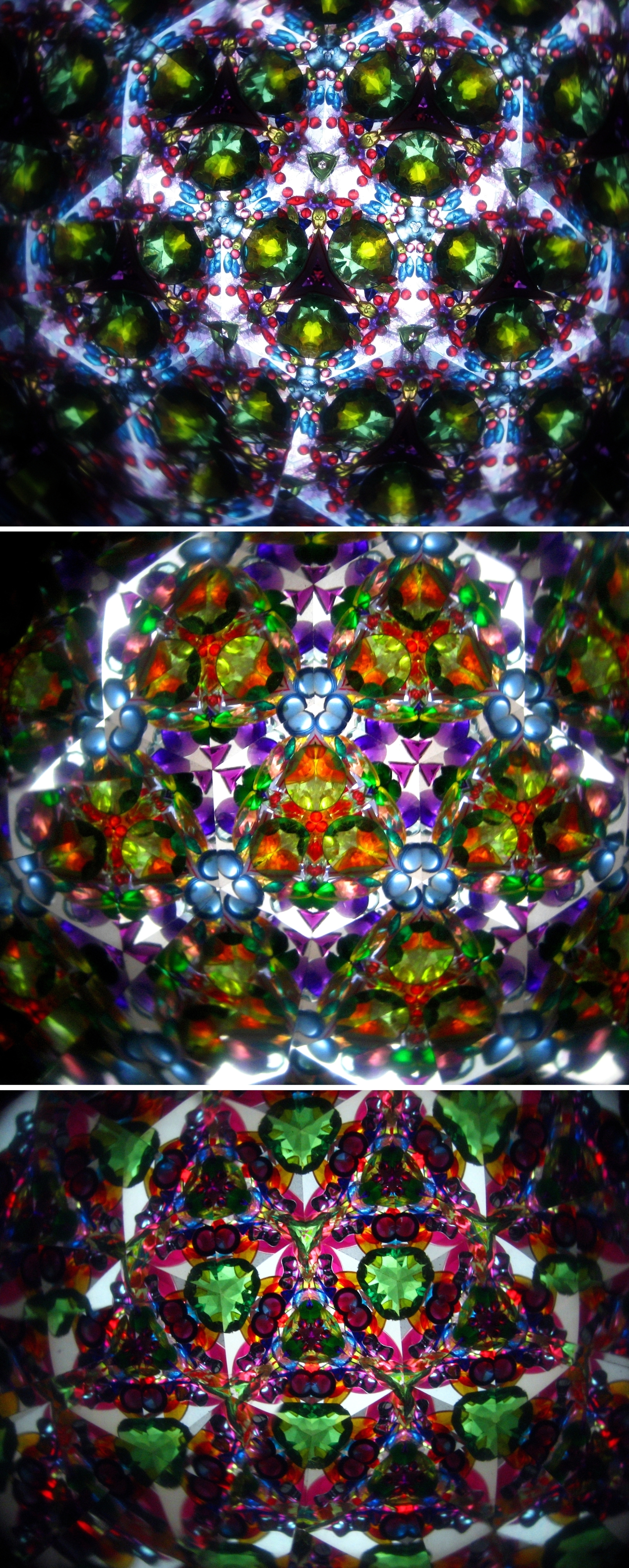
Patterns when seen through a kaleidoscope tube

Multiple reflection by two or more reflecting surfaces has been known since antiquity and was described as such by Giambattista della Porta in his Magia Naturalis (1558–1589). In 1646, Athanasius Kircher described an experiment with a construction of two mirrors, which could be opened and closed like a book and positioned in various angles, showing regular polygon figures consisting of reflected aliquot sectors of 360°. Richard Bradley's New Improvements in Planting and Gardening (1717) described a similar construction to be placed on geometrical drawings to show an image with multiplied reflection. However, an optimal configuration that produces the full effects of the kaleidoscope was not recorded before 1815.

Video of a rotating kaleidoscope view

In 1814, Sir David Brewster conducted experiments on light polarization by successive reflections between plates of glass and first noted "the circular arrangement of the images of a candle round a center, and the multiplication of the sectors formed by the extremities of the plates of glass". He forgot about it, but noticed a more impressive version of the effect during further experiments in February 1815. A while later, he was impressed by the multiplied reflection of a bit of cement that was pressed through at the end of a triangular glass trough, which appeared more regular and almost perfectly symmetrical in comparison to the reflected objects that had been situated further away from the reflecting plates in earlier experiments. This triggered more experiments to find the conditions for the most beautiful and symmetrically perfect conditions. An early version had pieces of colored glass and other irregular objects fixed permanently and was admired by some Members of the Royal Society of Edinburgh, including Sir George Mackenzie who predicted its popularity. A version followed in which some of the objects and pieces of glass could move when the tube was rotated. The last step, regarded as most important by Brewster, was to place the reflecting panes in a draw tube with a concave lens to distinctly introduce surrounding objects into the reflected pattern.

Brewster thought his instrument to be of great value in "all the ornamental arts" as a device that creates an "infinity of patterns". Artists could accurately delineate the produced figures of the kaleidoscope by means of the solar microscope (a type of camera obscura device), magic lantern or camera lucida. Brewster believed it would at the same time become a popular instrument "for the purposes of rational amusement". He decided to apply for a patent. British patent no. 4136 "for a new Optical Instrument called "The Kaleidoscope" for exhibiting and creating beautiful Forms and Patterns of great use in all the ornamental Arts" was granted in July 1817. Unfortunately, the manufacturer originally engaged to produce the product had shown one of the patent instruments to London opticians to see if he could get orders from them. Soon the instrument was copied and marketed before the manufacturer had prepared any number of kaleidoscopes for sale. An estimated two hundred thousand kaleidoscopes sold in London and Paris in just three months. Brewster figured at most a thousand of these were authorized copies that were constructed correctly, while the majority of the others did not give a correct impression of his invention. Because so relatively few people had experienced a proper kaleidoscope or knew how to apply it to ornamental arts, he decided to publicize a treatise on the principles and the correct construction of the kaleidoscope.

It was thought that the patent was reduced in a Court of Law since its principles were supposedly already known. Brewster stated that the kaleidoscope was different because the particular positions of the object and of the eye, played a very important role in producing the beautiful symmetrical forms. Brewster's opinion was shared by several scientists, including James Watt.

Philip Carpenter originally tried to produce his own imitation of the kaleidoscope, but was not satisfied with the results. He decided to offer his services to Brewster as manufacturer. Brewster agreed and Carpenter's models were stamped "sole maker". Realizing that the company could not meet the level of demand, Brewster gained permission from Carpenter in 1818 for the device to be made by other manufacturers. In his 1819 Treatise on the Kaleidoscope Brewster listed more than a dozen manufacturers/sellers of patent kaleidoscopes. Carpenter's company would keep on selling kaleidoscopes for 60 years.

In 1987, kaleidoscope artist Thea Marshall, working with the Willamette Science and Technology Center, a science museum located in Eugene, Oregon, designed and constructed a 1,000-square-foot (93 m^{2}) traveling mathematics and science exhibition titled Kaleidoscopes: Reflections of Science and Art. With funding from the National Science Foundation, and circulated under the auspices of the Smithsonian Institution Traveling Exhibition Service (SITES), the exhibition appeared in 15 science museums over a three-year period, reaching more than one million visitors in the United States and Canada. Interactive exhibit modules enabled visitors to better understand and appreciate how kaleidoscopes function.

== Variations ==
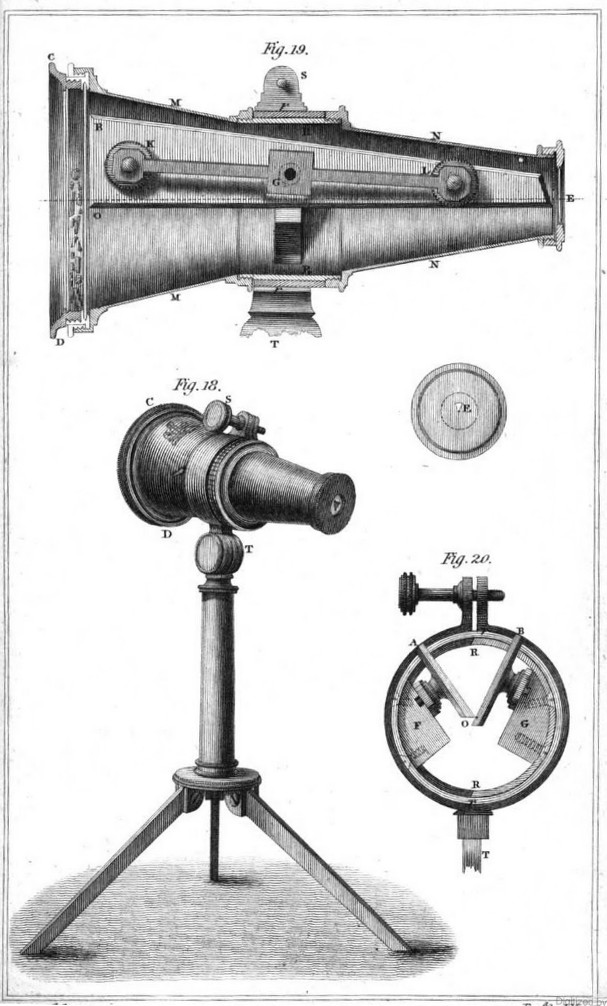
Polyangular Kaleidoscope of R. B. Bate (with adjustable reflector angles), as illustrated in Treatise on the Kaleidoscope (1819)

=== General variations ===
David Brewster defined several variables in his patent and publications:

- variations in size (Brewster deemed a length of five to ten inches convenient, for one to four inches he suggested the use of a lens with a focus length equal to the length of the reflectors)
- variations in the angle of inclination of the reflecting surfaces. In his patent Brewster deemed 18°, 20° or 22 1/2° most pleasing. In the treatise 45°, 36° and 30° are the primary examples.
- variations in material of the reflecting surfaces (plates of plain glass, quicksilvered glass (mirror) or metal, or the reflecting inner surfaces of a solid prism of glass or rock crystal) The choice of material can have some influence of the tint and the quality of the image.
- a wide variety of objects, small figures, fragments, liquids and materials of different colors and shapes can be used in object cells (apart from the more usual transparent fragments, for instance twisted pieces of iron or brass wire, or some lace, can produce very fine effects)

=== Different versions suggested by Brewster ===
In his patent, Brewster perceived two forms for the kaleidoscope:

- "most common form": two reflectors, small objects should be placed close to the aperture to be viewed at the other end
- "The compound, or telescopic Kaleidoscope": a tube with two reflectors, sliding inside another tube with one to three convex lenses, to be applied to any object at any distance (this was later re-introduced as the teleidoscope)

In his Treatise on the Kaleidoscope (1819) he described the basic form with an object cell:

- "simple form": a tube with two reflectors and objects such as pieces of colored glass either fixed or placed loosely in cell on the end of the instrument

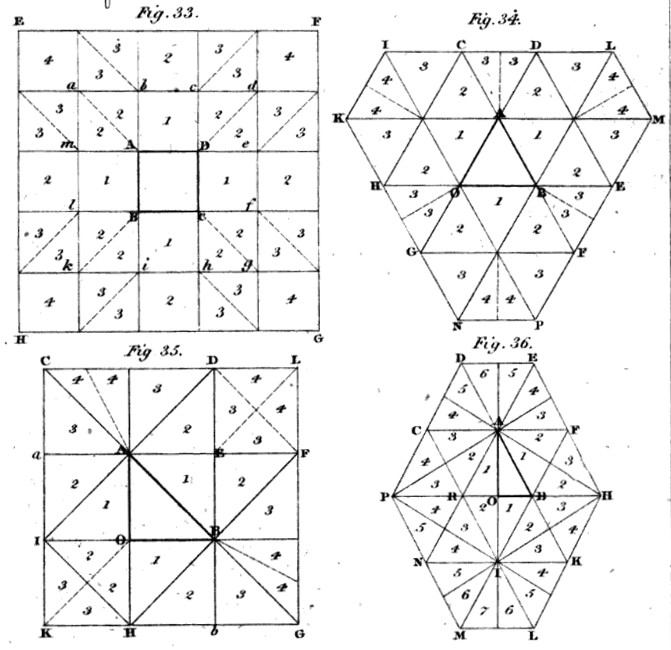
Diagrams of the patterns of polycentral kaleidoscoped in Treatise on the Kaleidoscope (1819)

Brewster also developed several variations:

- "Polycentral Kaleidoscope" with three reflectors at angles of 60°: the infinite pattern of equilateral triangles was deemed "uncommonly splendid" by Brewster
- "Polycentral Kaleidoscope" with three reflectors at angles of 90°, 45° and 45°: the pattern is not symmetrically arranged around the centre, but nonetheless deemed "very pleasing" by Brewster
- "Polycentral Kaleidoscope" with three reflectors at angles of 90°, 60° and 30°: the pattern with 31 reflected images of the aperture, not symmetrically arranged around the centre. Brewster deemed the effect "very beautiful, particularly when the reflectors are metallic".
- "Polycentral Kaleidoscopes" with four reflectors: square or rectangular kaleidoscope with an infinite pattern of squares or rectangles
- projection kaleidoscopes by means of the solar microscope or the magic lantern, allowing more people to see the pattern
- "Microscopic Kaleidoscope": minute kaleidoscopes (as small as one inch in length) for viewing microscopic objects, have also been worn by women as jewelry
- placement of "regularly crystallised bodies or pieces of glass that have received the polarising structure" in front of the aperture, to introduce "the complementary colors of polarised light"
- rectangular object plates moving through a groove cut in a cell attached to the ends of the reflector, allow for a greater variety in the motion of loose fragments. With fixed fragments a more calculated sequence of tints and shapes can be composed.
- "a vibrating object plate": a smaller object plate containing loose objects can be made to vibrate on its lower edge by a gentle motion of the tube if the kaleidoscope is held horizontally
- a colorless object plate, with either colorless pieces of glass or an irregular surface of transparent varnish, can be placed in front of a colorful object plate. The tints and outlines of the colorful pieces are softened by the refraction of the colorless pieces. The colorless objects supply outlines to the pattern. The colorless object plate can also produce fine colorless patterns when used alone.
- instead of in an object cell, transparent fragments can be placed on a mirror and be combined with opaque fragments (for instance pieces of brass wire, coloured foils and grains of spelter) for the best effects
- an object plate with fixed elements can be placed in cell, if the cell is rotated in front of the aperture the same patterns recur

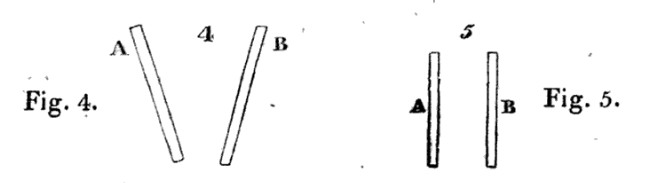
Alternative positions of the reflectors in the kaleidoscope, as illustrated in the 1817 patent.

- if the reflectors are kept separate (see Fig. 4 of patent illustration), annular patterns are shown
- if the reflectors are placed parallel to each other (see Fig. 5 of patent illustration), rectilinear patterns are shown

Brewster also imagined another application for the kaleidoscope:

- a type of color organ: for a harmonic visual composition, with effects similar to musical composition, a very simple piece of machinery could be developed "for introducing objects of different forms and colours for varying the direction of the motion across the angular aperture and for accommodating the velocity of their motion to the effect which it is intended to produce.".

=== Later variations ===
Manufacturers and artists have created kaleidoscopes with a wide variety of materials and in many shapes. A few of these added elements that were not previously described by inventor David Brewster:

- object cells have been filled with a viscous liquid so the items float and move gracefully through the object cell in response to slight movements from the viewer
- wand kaleidoscopes, with a moveable transparent sealed tube containing liquid showing sinking and/or floating objects (usually including glitter) past the end of the reflectors, were introduced in 1990 WildeWood Creative Products in collaboration with Cozy Baker
- object wheels or carousels rotating on an axis attached to the center of kaleidoscope can introduce shapes and colors into the kaleidoscope image
- exteriors of kaleidoscopes have been crafted into sculptural artworks
- large kaleidoscopes have been integrated in the architecture of some buildings

== Publications ==
Cozy Baker (d. October 19, 2010)—founder of the Brewster Kaleidoscope Society—collected kaleidoscopes and wrote books about many of the artists making them in the 1970s through 2001. Her book Kaleidoscope Artistry is a limited compendium of kaleidoscope makers, containing pictures of the interior and exterior views of contemporary artworks. Baker is credited with energizing a renaissance in kaleidoscope-making in the US; she spent her life putting kaleidoscope artists and galleries together so they would know each other and encourage each other.

In 1999, a short-lived magazine dedicated to kaleidoscopes—Kaleidoscope Review—was published, covering artists, collectors, dealers, events, and including how-to articles. This magazine was created and edited by Brett Bensley, at that time a well-known kaleidoscope artist and resource on kaleidoscope information. Changed name to The New Kaleidoscope Review, and then switched to a video presentation on YouTube, "The Kaleidoscope Maker".

== In popular culture ==
- The Rise and Fall of a Midwest Princess, the 2023 album by Chappell Roan contains the song "Kaleidoscope", which compares love to the unpredictable nature of the kaleidoscope, mentioning them four times.

== See also ==
- Form constant – Recurringly observed geometric pattern
- Fractal – Infinitely detailed mathematical structure
- Infinity mirror – Parallel or angled mirrors reflecting each other
- Kaleidocycle – Three-dimensional geometric shape
- La Maison de la Magie Robert-Houdin – French museum of magic
- Phenakistiscope – First widespread animation device that created a fluid illusion of motion
- Reflection group – Discrete group type in group theory
- Teleidoscope – Optical toy
- Uniform tilings in hyperbolic plane – Symmetric subdivision in hyperbolic geometry
