= Henry Underhill =

English amateur artist and intellectual

H.J.M. Underhill
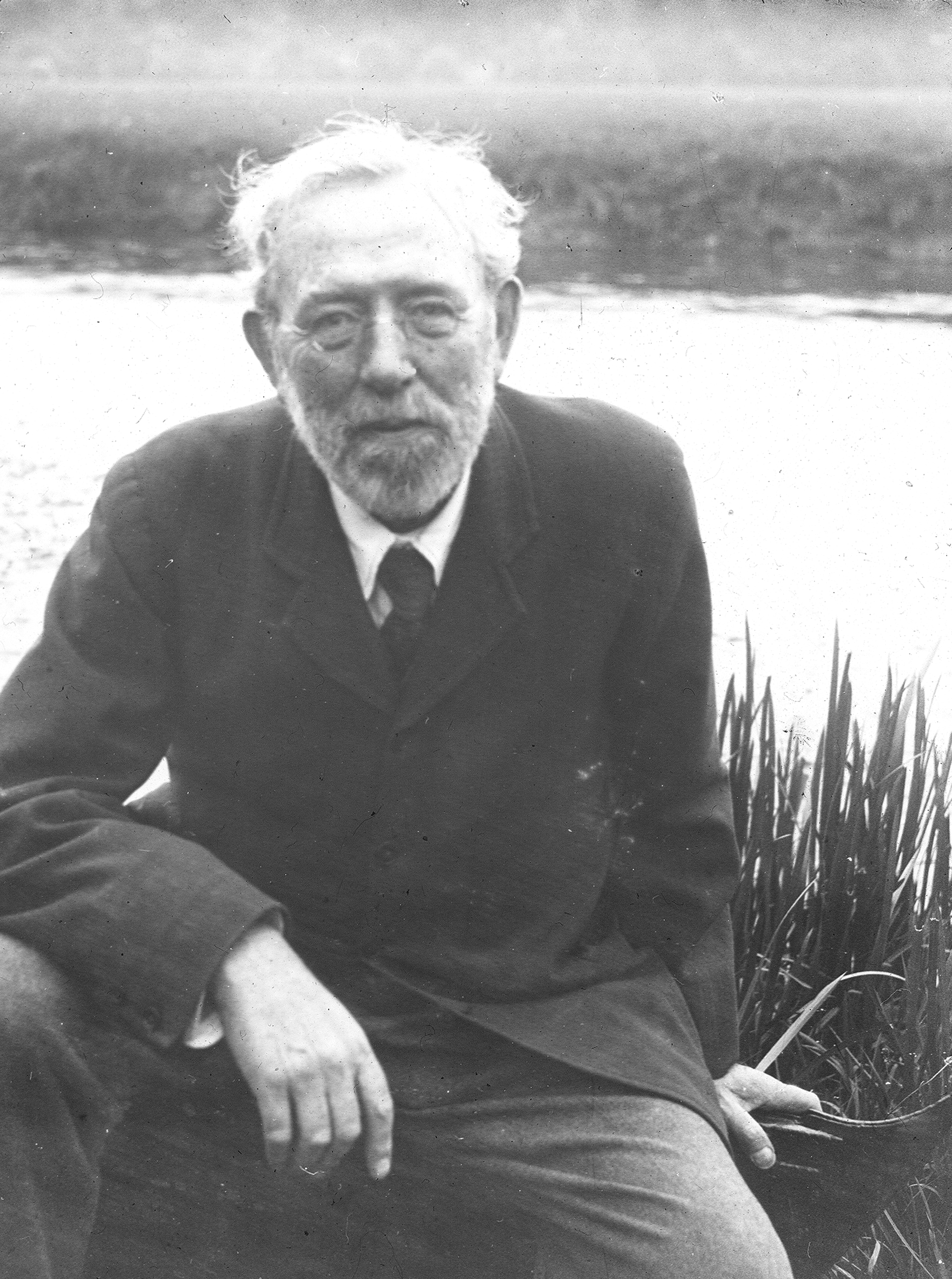
- Born: 1855; 7 High Street, Oxford, England
- Died: 2 October 1920 (aged 64–65); Oxford, England
- Burial place: Wolvercote Cemetery
- Other name: Henry Michael John Underhill
- Occupations: Photographer, lecturer, grocer
- Known for: Magic lantern lectures
- Notable work: The Age and Distribution of Folk Tales (inaugural lecture, 1893)

Henry Michael John Underhill (1855–1920) was an amateur scientist, artist, photographer and grocer from Oxford, England.

Underhill is best known for his hand-painted and photographic lantern slides which illustrate a variety of subjects including entomology, natural history, prehistoric British archaeology and folk tales. Underhill was a founding member of the Oxfordshire Natural History Society (now the Ashmolean Natural History Society of Oxfordshire).

== Personal life and education ==
Underhill was born in Oxford in 1855. He attended Christ Church Cathedral School and was a private pupil of the artist William Riviere. At one time, he lived at 20 Bardwell Road. After his father's death in 1896, Underhill took over as proprietor of the family's provisions store at 7 High Street, Oxford. He ran the shop until his own death in 1920.

For much of his life, Underhill participated in charitable endeavours for the George Street Congregational Sunday School and the Oxford branch of the Band of Hope (now Hope UK), organising outings and providing entertainment for the city’s poorer children. One of Underhill's earliest magic lantern shows was given to the pupils of the Oxford Ragged School, which his grandfather, father and uncle had helped to establish.

Underhill died on 2 October 1920 aged 65 after a long bout of cancer. He is buried in Wolvercote Cemetery.

== Oxfordshire Natural History Society and lantern slide lectures ==
Underhill was active in Oxford's intellectual community and helped to found the Oxfordshire Natural History Society. He served as the society's secretary before becoming its president in 1893.

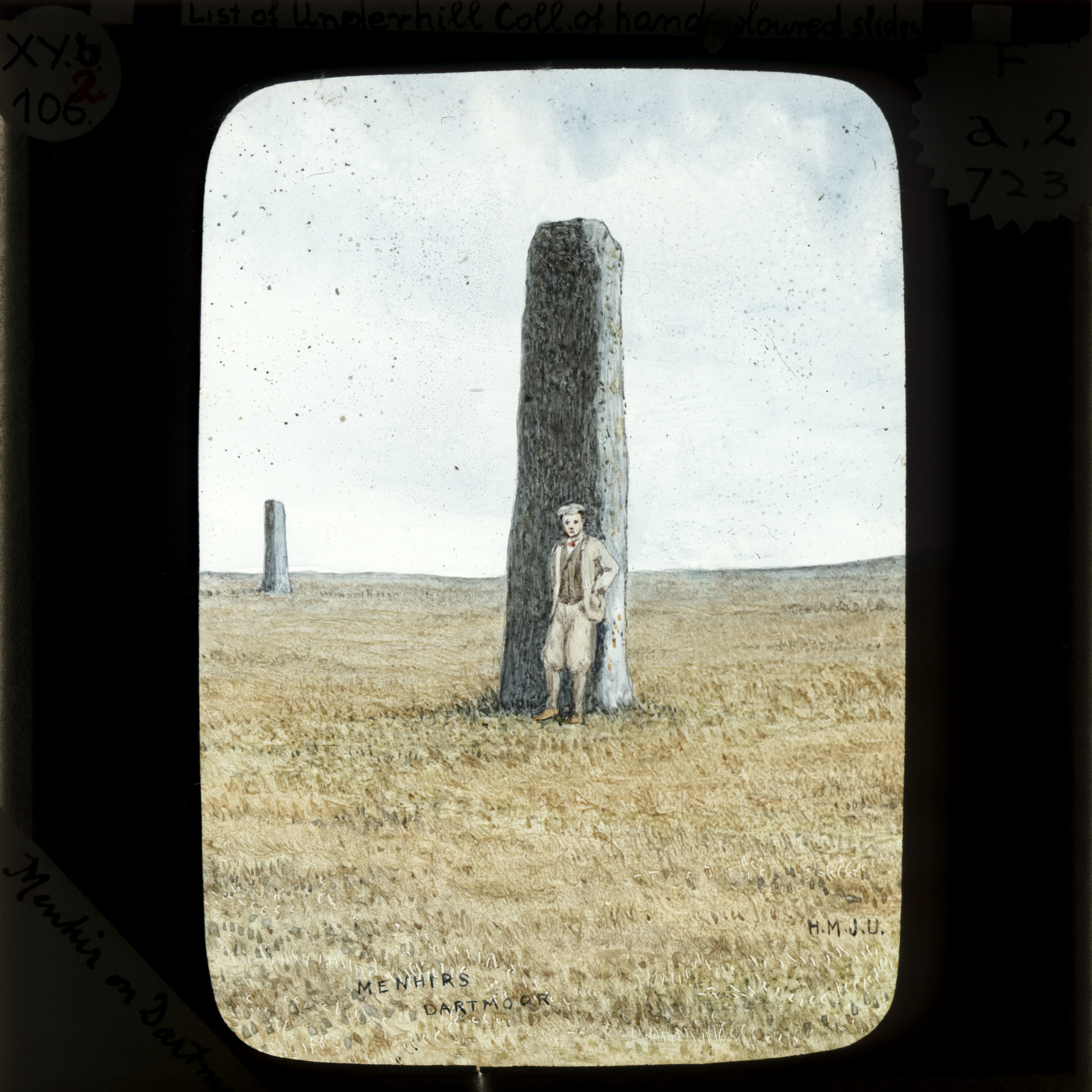
Glass lantern slide of a painting of standing stones in Dartmoor by Henry Underhill, 25 April 1895

Throughout the 1880s and 1890s, Underhill gave eleven lectures to the society on a variety of topics. All of his lectures were illustrated by his hand-painted and photographic lantern slides. His lectures for the society included:

- Spiders (1887)
- Insect Eyes (1888)
- Microscopic Organisms from Ponds (1889)
- Artistic Japan (1890)
- Painting Lantern Slides (1891)
- A Holiday in Norway (1892)

Underhill's inaugural lecture as president of the Oxfordshire Natural History Society, The Age and Distribution of Folk Tales (1893), featured lantern slides illustrating folk tales from England, Russia, Japan and Ireland. The Folklore Society holds a collection of over 300 of Underhill’s folk tale slides.

In 1896, Underhill gave a lecture entitled Great Stone Circles on megalithic monuments of South-West Britain, which included hand-painted lantern slides depicting Stonehenge, the Rollright Stones and Avebury. The lecture was attended by British archaeologist Arthur Evans, then keeper of the Ashmolean Museum, and the Hope Professor of Zoology, Edward Poulton.

Underhill’s photographic slides of North Leigh Roman Villa, which accompanied his 1895 lecture on Buried Roman Cities in England, have archaeological significance as they illustrate the original design of the villa’s third-century mosaic before it was reconstructed in the 1920s.

== Photography ==
In 1897, Underhill became a member of the Oxford Camera Club. He regularly gave lectures to the club, mostly on technical subjects to do with photograph technology.

In 1907, as part of a project organised by the Oxford Architectural and Historical Society to record historic architecture in the area, Underhill photographed windmills in Oxfordshire and Buckinghamshire. The photographs are significant in the modern day as they depict a number of monuments which no longer survive; they are now held by the Oxford University History of Science Museum.

Underhill also photographed family, friends and society members on leisure outings in the late 19th and early 20th centuries. A selection of these photographs has been shown in exhibitions at the Museum of Oxford.
