= Claude Dechales =

French Jesuit priest and mathematician

- Born: 1621; Chambéry, Savoy
- Died: 28 March 1678 (aged 56–57); Turin, Piedmont
- Scientific career
- Fields: Mathematics

Claude François Milliet Dechales (1621 – 28 March 1678) was a French Jesuit priest and mathematician. He published a treatise on mathematics and a translation of the works of Euclid.

== Biography ==
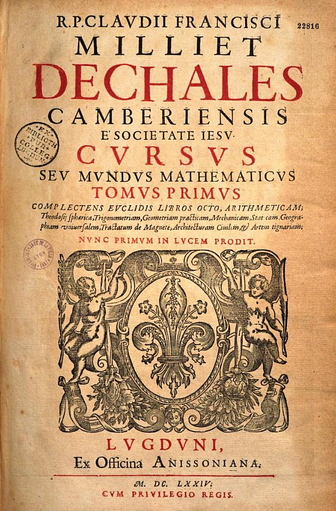

Born in Chambéry, Savoy, Claude Dechales (De Challes) was the son of Hector Milliet de Challes (1568–1642), first president of Sovereign Senate of Savoy.

He entered the Jesuits at the age of fifteen on 21 September 1636. He participated in the French Jesuit mission to the Ottoman Empire and taught literature in the schools of his order for nine years. Back in France, Louis XIV had him appointed professor of hydrography in Marseille where he taught navigation and military engineering. He then moved to the Trinity College in Lyon in 1674, where he simultaneously taught philosophy (4 years), mathematics (6 years) and theology (5 years). He published in Lyon his famous Cursus seu Mondus Matematicus. At the end of his life, Dechales taught mathematics in a college in Turin in Piedmont, where he died, on 28 March 1678.

== Publications ==
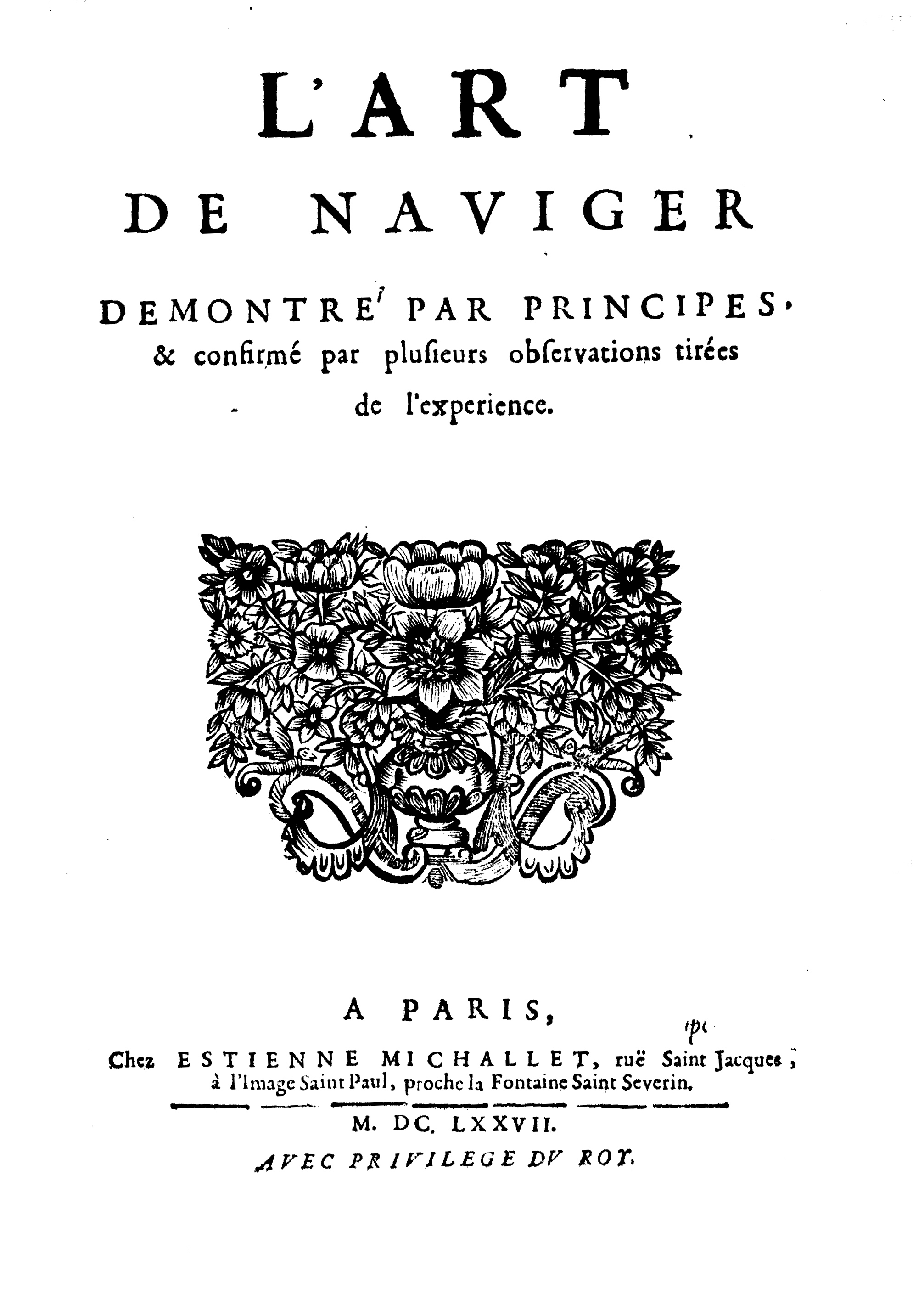
- Art de naviguer, 1677
  1660–1672 : Huict livres des Elemens d'Euclide rendus plus faciles par le R.P. Claude François Milliet Dechales, de la Compagnie de Jésus (B. Coral, Lyon).
- 1674 : a second edition of Euclide, Elementorum Euclidis libri octo, ad faciliorem captum accommodati (Lyon, Anisson).
- 1674 : Cursus seu Mondus Matematicus Ex officina anissonina (Anisson).
- 1677 : L'art de fortifier, de défendre et d'attaquer les places, suivant les méthodes françoises, hollandoises, italiennes et espagnoles (Paris), and L'art de naviger demontré par principes et confirmé par plusieurs observations tirées de l'experience (Paris).
- 1682 : Traité du mouvement local et du ressort dans lequel, leur nature, & leurs causes, sont curieusement recherchées, & ou les loix qu'ils observent dans l'acceleration & les pendules, & encore dans la percussion & la reflexion des corps, sont solidement establies, à Lyon chez Anisson et Posuel.
- 1685 : Euclide translated in English under the title The elements of Euclid explain'd, in a new, but most easie method : together with the use of every proposition through all parts of the mathematicks.

== Sources ==
- MacDonnell, Joseph (1989). "Publications in Geometry". Jesuit geometers : a study of fifty-six prominent Jesuit geometers during the first two centuries of Jesuit history. Saint Louis: Institute of Jesuit Sources. ISBN 0-912422-94-7. Archived from the original on 19 August 2018.
- Smith, David Eugene (1958). History of Mathematics. Courier Corporation. p. 386. ISBN 978-0-486-20429-1.
- Nardi, Antonio, "An eccentric adherent of Galileo. The jesuit François Milliet Dechales between Galileo and Newton", Archives internationales d'histoire des sciences 49 (142), January 1999
- Le scholasticon, by Jacob Schmutz.
- Vincent Jullien : les Eléments de géométrie de Gilles Personne de Roberval,
