= Camera obscura =

Optical device

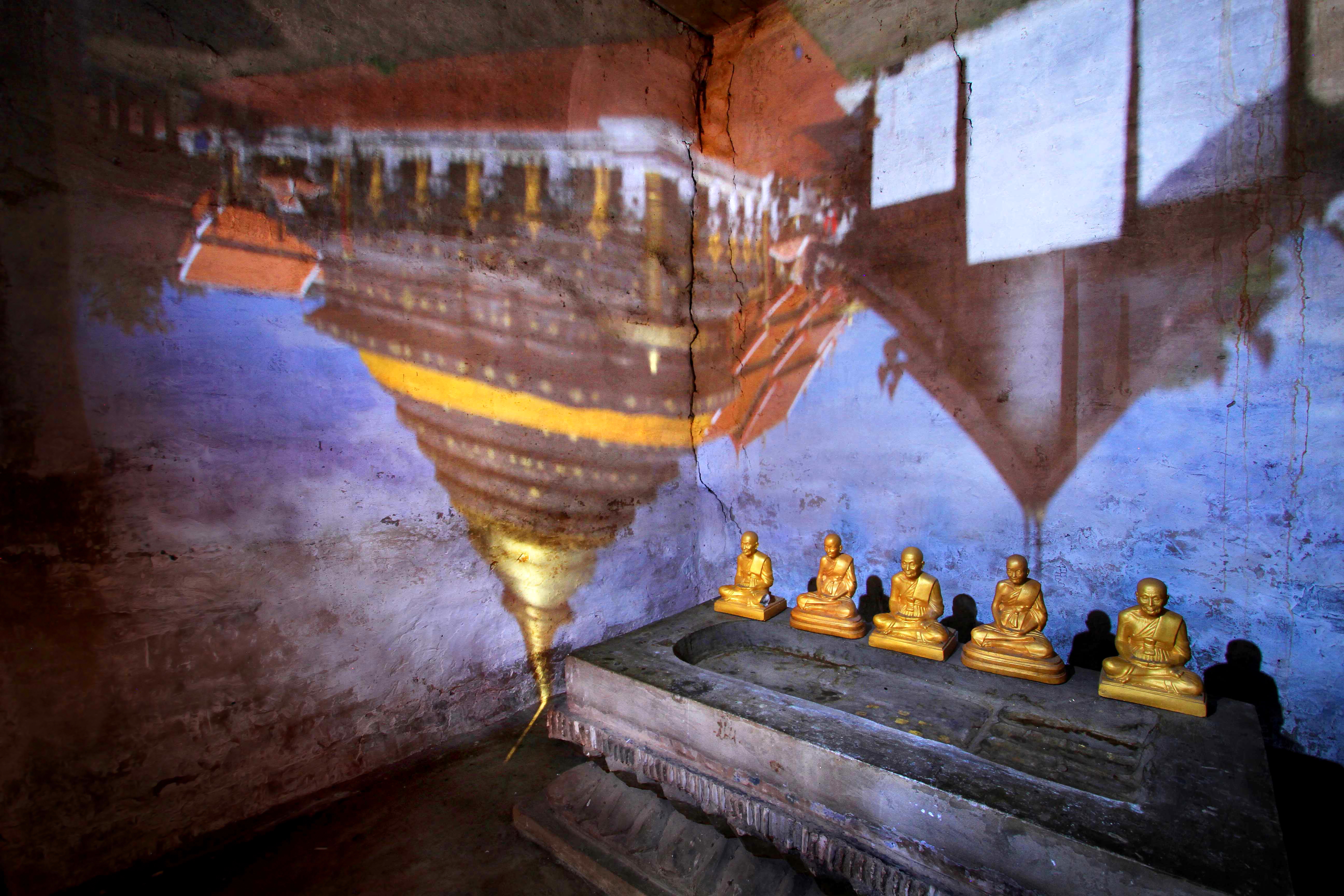
A camera obscura image in Wat Phra That Lampang Luang in Thailand

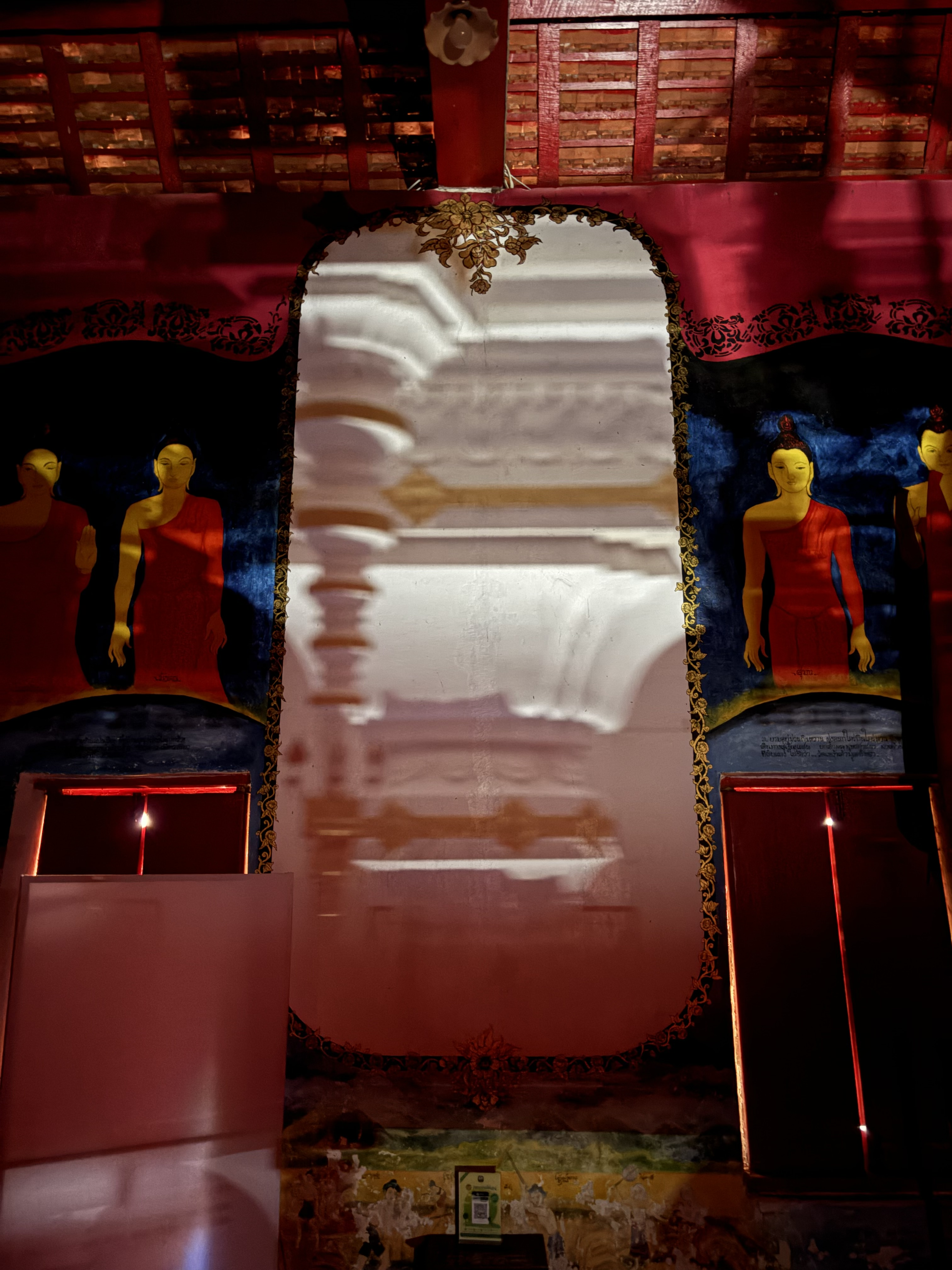
An image of the stupa projected onto a wall of Ubosot of Wat Thong Laplae in Thailand by the gap built between the window panels and the windowsill

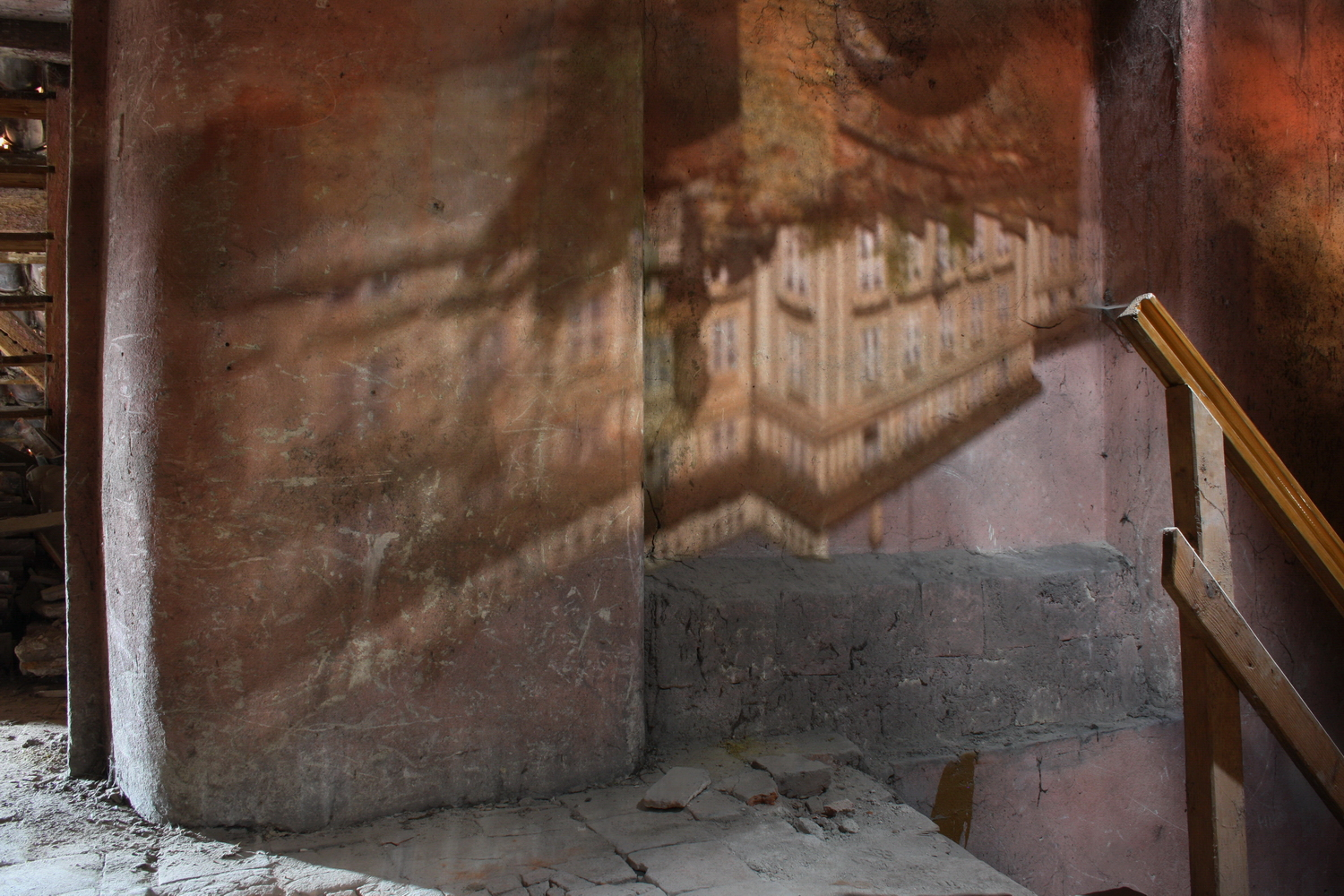
An image of the New Royal Palace at Prague Castle projected onto an attic wall by a hole in the tile roofing

Examples of camera obscuras in situ

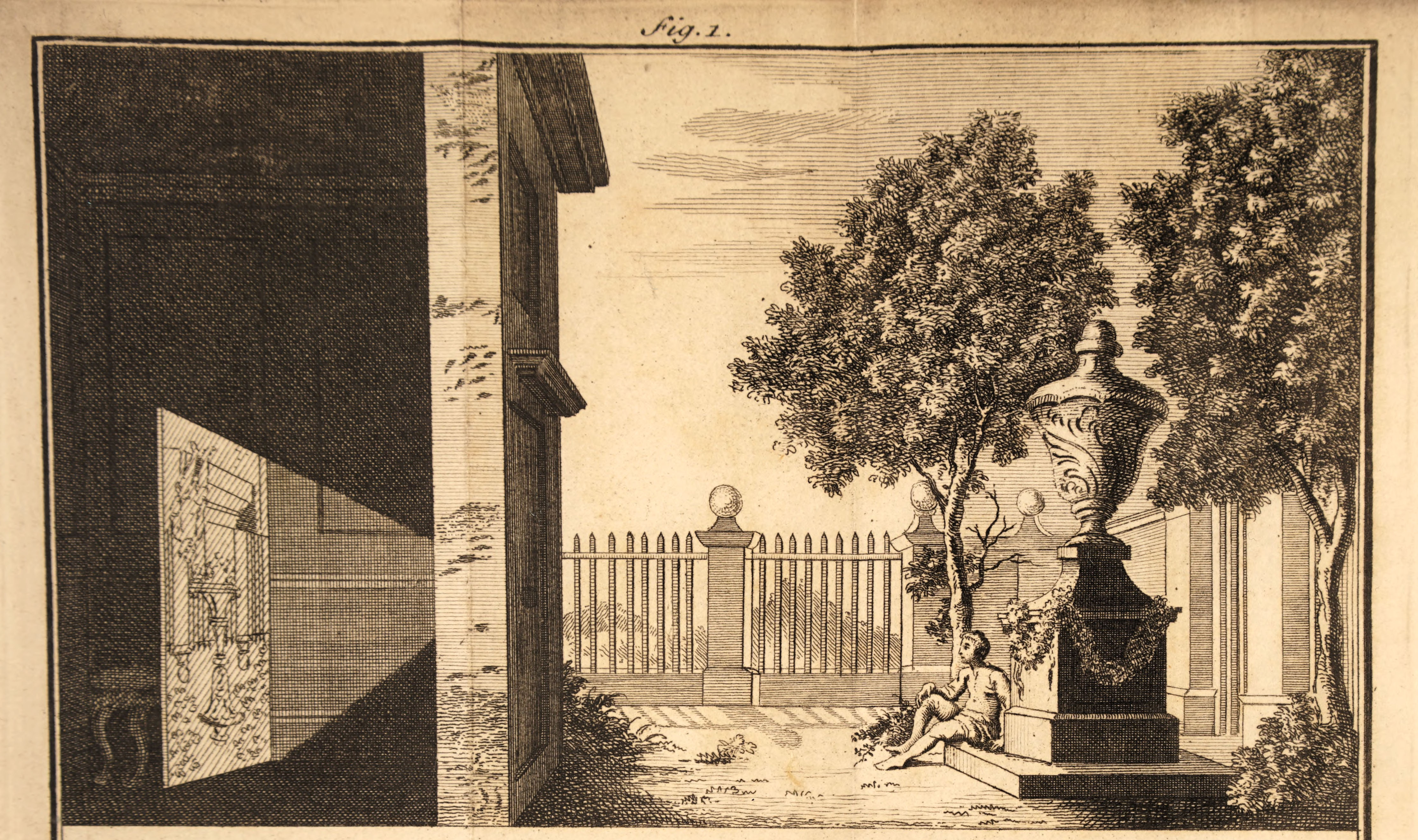
Illustration of the camera obscura principle from James Ayscough's A short account of the eye and nature of vision (1755 fourth edition)

A camera obscura (pl. camerae obscurae or camera obscuras; from Latin camera obscūra 'dark chamber') is the natural phenomenon in which light passing through the small hole of a dark chamber or box will project an image of a scene outside the chamber (box) onto the surface opposite to the hole, resulting in an inverted (upside down) and reversed (left to right) projection of the view outside.

Camera obscura refers to analogous constructions such as a darkened room, box or tent in which an exterior image is projected inside or onto a translucent screen viewed from outside. Camera obscuras with a lens in the opening have been used since the second half of the 16th century and became popular as aids for drawing and painting. The technology was developed further into the photographic camera in the first half of the 19th century, when camera obscura boxes were used to expose light-sensitive materials to the projected image.

The image (or the principle of its projection) of a lensless camera obscura is also referred to as a "pinhole image".

The camera obscura was used to study eclipses without the risk of damaging the eyes by looking directly into the Sun. As a drawing aid, it allowed tracing the projected image to produce a highly accurate representation, and was especially appreciated as an easy way to achieve proper graphical perspective.

Before the term camera obscura was first used in 1604, other terms were used to refer to the devices: cubiculum obscurum, cubiculum tenebricosum, conclave obscurum, and locus obscurus.

A camera obscura without a lens but with a very small hole is sometimes referred to as a "pinhole camera", although this more often refers to simple (homemade) lensless cameras where photographic film or photographic paper is used.

== Physical explanation ==
Rays of light travel in straight lines and change when they are reflected and partly absorbed by an object, retaining information about the color and brightness of the surface of that object. Lighted objects reflect rays of light in all directions. A small enough opening in a barrier admits only the rays that travel directly from different points in the scene on the other side, and these rays form an image of that scene where they reach a surface opposite from the opening.

The human eye (and that of many other animals) works much like a camera obscura, with rays of light entering an opening (pupil), getting focused through a convex lens and passing a dark chamber before forming an inverted image on a smooth surface (retina). The analogy appeared early in the 16th century and would in the 17th century find common use to illustrate Western theological ideas about God creating the universe as a machine, with a predetermined purpose (just like humans create machines). This had a huge influence on behavioral science, especially on the study of perception and cognition. In this context, it is noteworthy that the projection of inverted images is actually a physical principle of optics that predates the emergence of life (rather than a biological or technological invention) and is not characteristic of all biological vision.

== Technology ==
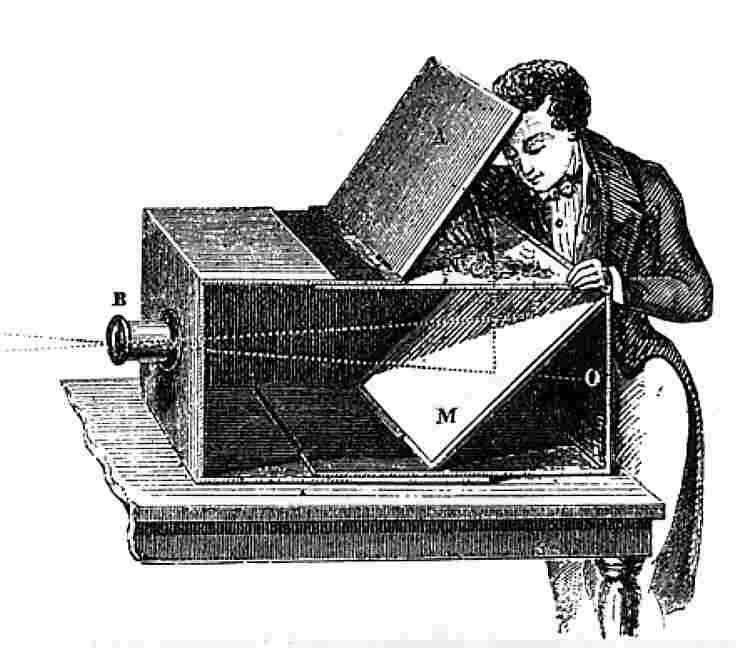
A camera obscura box with mirror, with an upright projected image at the top

A camera obscura consists of a box, tent, or room with a small hole in one side or the top. Light from an external scene passes through the hole and strikes a surface inside, where the scene is reproduced, inverted (upside-down) and reversed (left to right), but with color and perspective preserved.

To produce a reasonably clear projected image, the aperture is typically smaller than 1/100 the distance from the screen. As the pinhole is made smaller, the image gets sharper, but dimmer. With too small of a pinhole, sharpness is lost because of diffraction. Optimum sharpness is attained with an aperture diameter approximately equal to the geometric mean of the wavelength of light and the distance to the screen.

In practice, camera obscuras use a lens rather than a pinhole because it makes a larger aperture work which achieves a usable brightness while maintaining focus.

If the image is caught on a transparent screen, it can be viewed from the back so that it is no longer reversed (but still upside-down). Using mirrors, it is possible to project a right-side-up image. The projection can also be displayed on a horizontal surface (e.g., a table). The 18th-century overhead version in tents used mirrors inside a kind of periscope on the top of the tent.

The box-type camera obscura often has an angled mirror projecting an upright image onto tracing paper placed on its glass top. Although the image is viewed from the back, it is reversed by the mirror.

== History ==
=== Prehistory to 500 BC: Possible inspiration for prehistoric art and possible use in religious ceremonies, gnomons ===
There are theories that occurrences of camera obscura effects (through tiny holes in tents or in screens of animal hide) inspired paleolithic cave paintings. Distortions in the shapes of animals in many paleolithic cave artworks might be inspired by distortions seen when the surface on which an image was projected was not straight or not in the right angle. It is also suggested that camera obscura projections could have played a role in Neolithic structures.

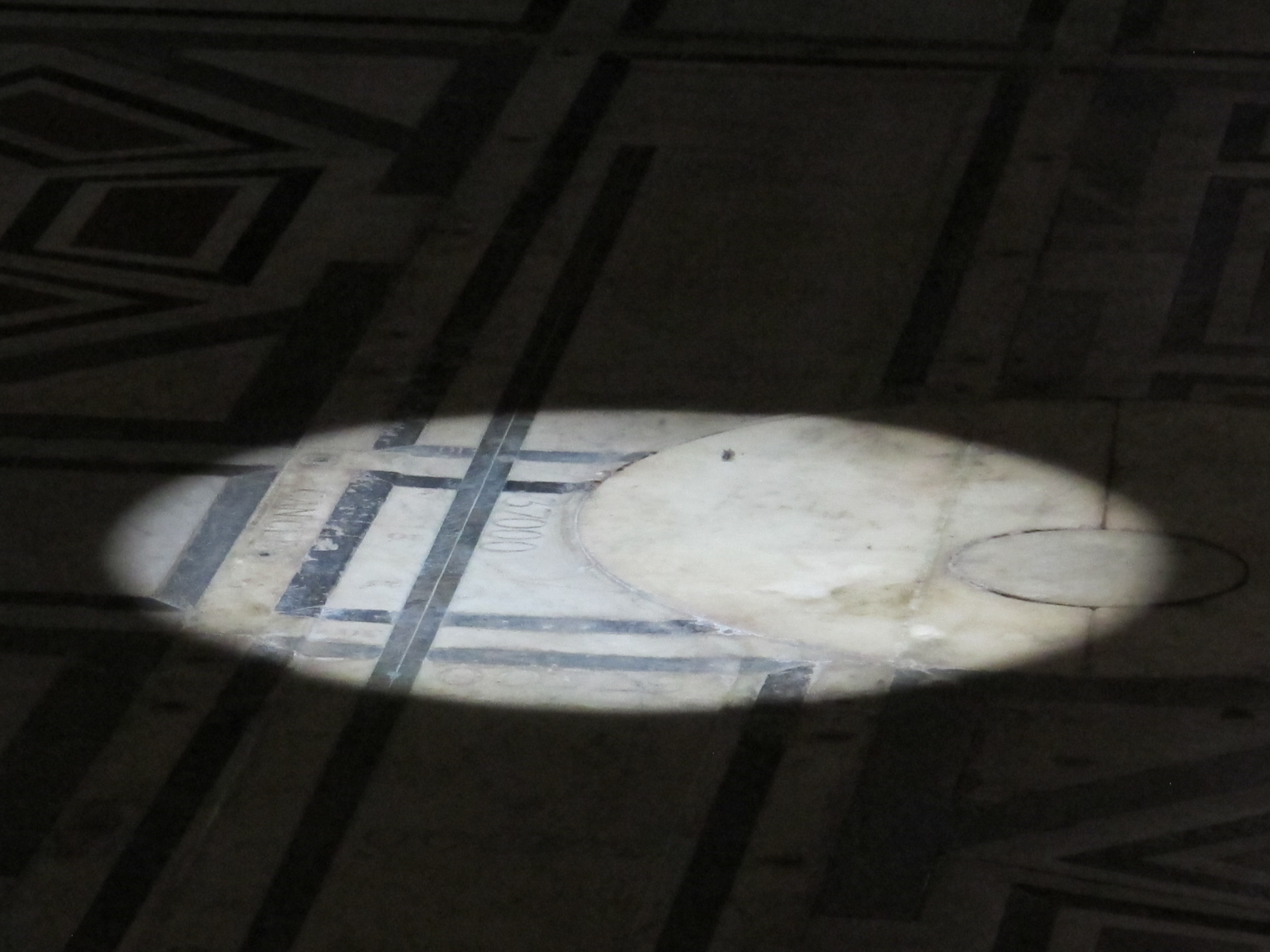
The gnomon projection of the sun's shape on the floor of Florence Cathedral during the solstice on 21 June 2012

Perforated gnomons projecting a pinhole image of the sun were described in the Chinese Zhoubi Suanjing writings (1046 BC–256 BC with material added until c. 220 AD). The location of the bright circle can be measured to tell the time of day and year. In Middle Eastern and European cultures its invention was much later attributed to Egyptian astronomer and mathematician Ibn Yunus around 1000 AD.

=== 500 BC to 500 AD: Earliest written observations ===
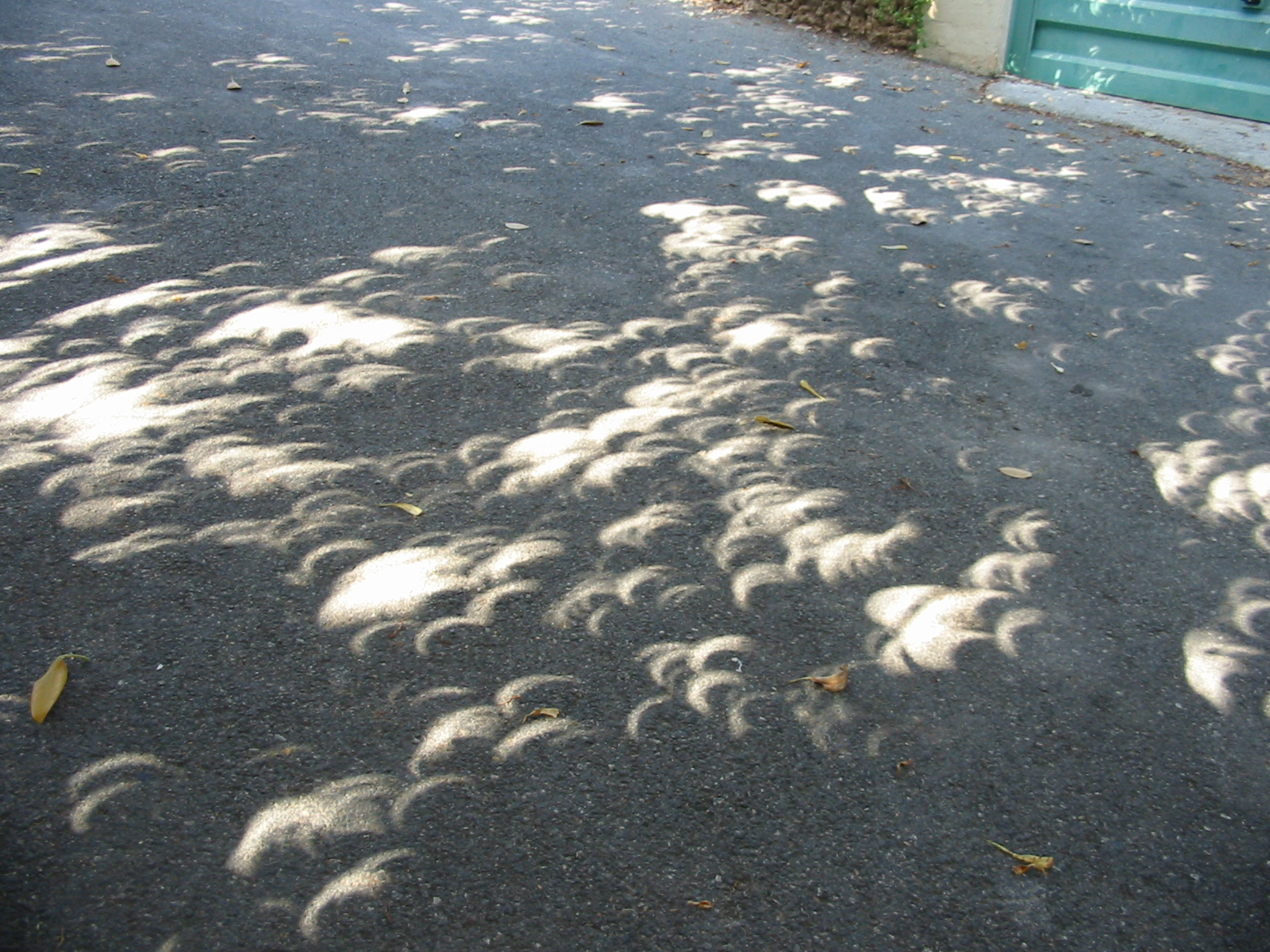
Holes in the leaf canopy project images of a solar eclipse on the ground

One of the earliest known written records of a pinhole image is found in the Chinese text called Mozi, dated to the 4th century BC, traditionally ascribed to and named for Mozi (c. 470 BC – c. 391 BC), a Chinese philosopher and the founder of Mohist School of Logic. These writings explain how the image in a "collecting-point" or "treasure house" (Note: In the Mozi passage, a camera obscura is described as a "collecting-point" or "treasure house" (庫); the 18th-century scholar Bi Yuan (畢沅) suggested this was a misprint for "screen" (㢓).) is inverted by an intersecting point (pinhole) that collects the (rays of) light. Light coming from the foot of an illuminated person gets partly hidden below (i.e., strikes below the pinhole) and partly forms the top of the image. Rays from the head are partly hidden above (i.e., strike above the pinhole) and partly form the lower part of the image.

Another early account is provided by Greek philosopher Aristotle (384–322 BC), or possibly a follower of his ideas. Similar to the later 11th-century Middle Eastern scientist Alhazen, Aristotle is also thought to have used camera obscura for observing solar eclipses. The formation of pinhole images is touched upon as a subject in the work Problems – Book XV, asking:

Why is it that when the sun passes through quadri-laterals, as for instance in wickerwork, it does not produce a figure rectangular in shape but circular?

and further on:

Why is it that an eclipse of the sun, if one looks at it through a sieve or through leaves, such as a plane-tree or other broadleaved tree, or if one joins the fingers of one hand over the fingers of the other, the rays are crescent-shaped where they reach the earth? Is it for the same reason as that when light shines through a rectangular peep-hole, it appears circular in the form of a cone?

In an attempt to explain the phenomenon, the author described how the light formed two cones; one between the Sun and the aperture and one between the aperture and the Earth. However, the roundness of the image was attributed to the idea that parts of the rays of light (assumed to travel in straight lines) are cut off at the angles in the aperture become so weak that they cannot be noticed.

Many philosophers and scientists of the Western world would ponder the contradiction between light travelling in straight lines and the formation of round spots of light behind differently shaped apertures, until it became generally accepted that the circular and crescent-shapes described in the "problem" were pinhole image projections of the sun.

In his book Optics (c. 300 BC, surviving in later manuscripts from around 1000 AD), Euclid proposed mathematical descriptions of vision with "lines drawn directly from the eye pass through a space of great extent" and "the form of the space included in our vision is a cone, with its apex in the eye and its base at the limits of our vision." Later versions of the text, like Ignazio Danti's 1573 annotated translation, would add a description of the camera obscura principle to demonstrate Euclid's ideas.

=== 500 to 1000: Earliest experiments, study of light ===
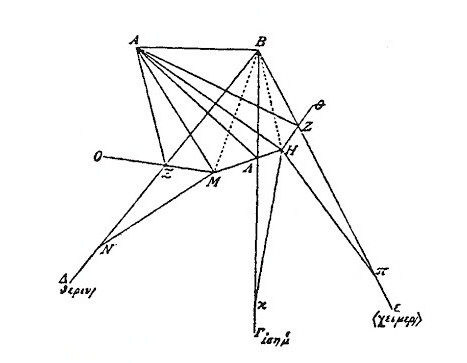
Anthemius of Tralles's diagram of light-rays reflected with plane mirror through hole (B)

In the 6th century, the Byzantine-Greek mathematician and architect Anthemius of Tralles (most famous as a co-architect of the Hagia Sophia) experimented with effects related to the camera obscura. Anthemius had a sophisticated understanding of the involved optics, as demonstrated by a light-ray diagram he constructed in 555 AD.

In his optical treatise De Aspectibus, Al-Kindi (c. 801 – c. 873) wrote about pinhole images to prove that light travels in straight lines.

In the 10th century Yu Chao-Lung supposedly projected images of pagoda models through a small hole onto a screen to study directions and divergence of rays of light.

=== 1000 to 1400: Optical and astronomical tool ===
A diagram depicting Ibn al-Haytham's observations of light's behaviour through a pinhole

Pinhole camera. Light enters a dark box through a small hole and creates an inverted image on the wall opposite the hole.

Middle Eastern physicist Ibn al-Haytham (known in the West by the Latinised Alhazen) (965–1040) extensively studied the camera obscura phenomenon in the early 11th century.

In his treatise "On the shape of the eclipse" he provided the first experimental and mathematical analysis of the phenomenon. He understood the relationship between the focal point and the pinhole.

The image of the sun at the time of the eclipse, unless it is total, demonstrates that when its light passes through a narrow, round hole and is cast on a plane opposite to the hole it takes on the form of a moon-sickle. The image of the sun shows this peculiarity only when the hole is very small. When the hole is enlarged, the picture changes, and the change increases with the added width. When the aperture is very wide, the sickle-form image will disappear, and the light will appear round when the hole is round, square if the hole is square, and if the shape of the opening is irregular, the light on the wall will take on this shape, provided that the hole is wide and the plane on which it is thrown is parallel to it.

In his Book of Optics (c. 1027), Ibn al-Haytham explained that rays of light travel in straight lines and are distinguished by the body that reflected the rays, writing:

Evidence that light and color do not mingle in air or (other) transparent bodies is (found in) the fact that, when several candles are at various distinct locations in the same area, and when they all face an aperture that opens into a dark recess, and when there is a white wall or (other white) opaque body in the dark recess facing that aperture, the (individual) lights of those candles appear individually upon that body or wall according to the number of those candles; and each of those lights (spots of light) appears directly opposite one (particular) candle along a straight line passing through that window. Moreover, if one candle is shielded, only the light opposite that candle is extinguished, but if the shielding object is lifted, the light will return.

Latin translations of the Book of Optics from about 1200 onward seemed very influential in Europe. Among those Ibn al-Haytham is thought to have inspired are Witelo, John Peckham, Roger Bacon, Leonardo da Vinci, René Descartes and Johannes Kepler. However, On the shape of the eclipse remained exclusively available in Arabic until the 20th century and no comparable explanation was found in Europe before Kepler addressed it. It was actually al-Kindi's work and especially the widely circulated pseudo-Euclidean De Speculis that was cited by the early scholars interested in pinhole images.

In his 1088 book, Dream Pool Essays, the Song dynasty Chinese scientist Shen Kuo (1031–1095) compared the focal point of a concave burning-mirror and the "collecting" hole of camera obscura phenomena to an oar in a rowlock to explain how the images were inverted:

"When a bird flies in the air, its shadow moves along the ground in the same direction. But if its image is collected (shu)(like a belt being tightened) through a small hole in a window, then the shadow moves in the direction opposite of that of the bird.[...] This is the same principle as the burning-mirror. Such a mirror has a concave surface, and reflects a finger to give an upright image if the object is very near, but if the finger moves farther and farther away it reaches a point where the image disappears and after that the image appears inverted. Thus the point where the image disappears is like the pinhole of the window. So also the oar is fixed at the rowlock somewhere at its middle part, constituting, when it is moved, a sort of 'waist' and the handle of the oar is always in the position inverse to the end (which is in the water)."

Shen Kuo also responded to a statement of Duan Chengshi in Miscellaneous Morsels from Youyang written in about 840 that the inverted image of a Chinese pagoda tower beside a seashore, was inverted because it was reflected by the sea: "This is nonsense. It is a normal principle that the image is inverted after passing through the small hole."

English statesman and scholastic philosopher Robert Grosseteste (c. 1175 – 9 October 1253) was one of the earliest Europeans who commented on the camera obscura.

English philosopher and Franciscan friar Roger Bacon (c. 1219/20 – c. 1292) falsely stated in his De Multiplicatione Specerium (1267) that an image projected through a square aperture was round because light would travel in spherical waves and therefore assumed its natural shape after passing through a hole. He is also credited with a manuscript that advised to study solar eclipses safely by observing the rays passing through some round hole and studying the spot of light they form on a surface.

Polish friar, theologian, physicist, mathematician and natural philosopher Vitello wrote about the camera obscura in his influential treatise Perspectiva (c.1270–1278), which was largely based on Ibn al-Haytham's work.

English archbishop and scholar John Peckham (c. 1230 – 1292) wrote about the camera obscura in his Tractatus de Perspectiva (c. 1269–1277) and Perspectiva communis (c. 1277–79), falsely arguing that light gradually forms the circular shape after passing through the aperture. His writings were influenced by Bacon.

French astronomer Guillaume de Saint-Cloud suggested in his 1292 work Almanach Planetarum that the eccentricity of the Sun could be determined with the camera obscura from the inverse proportion between the distances and the apparent solar diameters at apogee and perigee.

Kamāl al-Dīn al-Fārisī (1267–1319) described in his 1309 work Kitab Tanqih al-Manazir (The Revision of the Optics) how he experimented with a glass sphere filled with water in a camera obscura with a controlled aperture and found that the colors of the rainbow are phenomena of the decomposition of light.

French Jewish philosopher, mathematician, physicist and astronomer/astrologer Levi ben Gershon (1288–1344) (also known as Gersonides or Leo de Balneolis) made several astronomical observations using a camera obscura with a Jacob's staff, describing methods to measure the angular diameters of the Sun, the Moon and the bright planets Venus and Jupiter. He determined the eccentricity of the Sun based on his observations of the summer and winter solstices in 1334. Levi also noted how the size of the aperture determined the size of the projected image. He wrote about his findings in Hebrew in his treatise Sefer Milhamot Ha-Shem (The Wars of the Lord) Book V Chapters 5 and 9.

=== 1450 to 1600: Depiction, lenses, drawing aid, mirrors ===
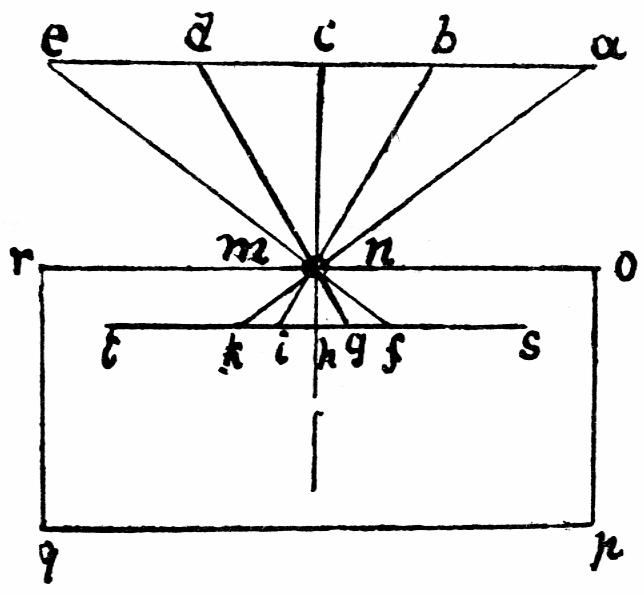
Da Vinci: Let a b c d e be the object illuminated by the sun and o r the front of the dark chamber in which is the said hole at n m. Let s t be the sheet of paper intercepting the rays of the images of these objects upside down, because the rays being straight, a on the right hand becomes k on the left, and e on the left becomes f on the right

Italian polymath Leonardo da Vinci (1452–1519), familiar with the work of Alhazen in Latin translation and having extensively studied the physics and physiological aspects of optics, wrote the oldest known clear description of the camera obscura, in 1502 (found in the Codex Atlanticus, translated from Latin):

If the facade of a building, or a place, or a landscape is illuminated by the sun and a small hole is drilled in the wall of a room in a building facing this, which is not directly lighted by the sun, then all objects illuminated by the sun will send their images through this aperture and will appear, upside down, on the wall facing the hole. You will catch these pictures on a piece of white paper, which placed vertically in the room not far from that opening, and you will see all the above-mentioned objects on this paper in their natural shapes or colors, but they will appear smaller and upside down, on account of crossing of the rays at that aperture. If these pictures originate from a place which is illuminated by the sun, they will appear colored on the paper exactly as they are. The paper should be very thin and must be viewed from the back.

These descriptions, however, would remain unknown until Venturi deciphered and published them in 1797.

Da Vinci was clearly very interested in the camera obscura: over the years he drew approximately 270 diagrams of the camera obscura in his notebooks. He systematically experimented with various shapes and sizes of apertures and with multiple apertures (1, 2, 3, 4, 8, 16, 24, 28 and 32). He compared the working of the eye to that of the camera obscura and seemed especially interested in its capability of demonstrating basic principles of optics: the inversion of images through the pinhole or pupil, the non-interference of images and the fact that images are "all in all and all in every part".

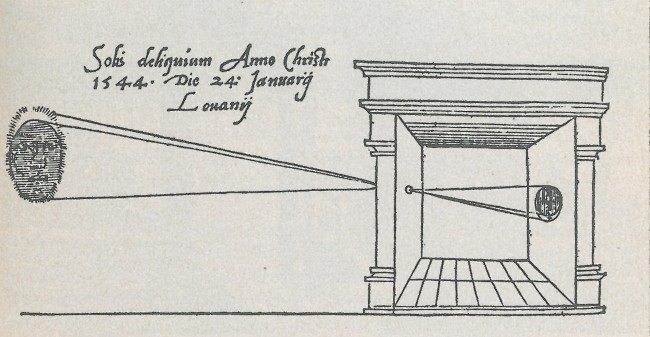
First published picture of camera obscura, in Gemma Frisius' 1545 book De Radio Astronomica et Geometrica

The oldest known published drawing of a camera obscura is found in Dutch physician, mathematician and instrument maker Gemma Frisius’ 1545 book De Radio Astronomica et Geometrica, in which he described and illustrated how he used the camera obscura to study the solar eclipse of 24 January 1544

Italian polymath Gerolamo Cardano described using a glass disc—probably a biconvex lens—in a camera obscura in his 1550 book De subtilitate, vol. I, Libri IV. He suggested to use it to view "what takes place in the street when the sun shines" and advised to use a very white sheet of paper as a projection screen so the colours would not be dull.

Sicilian mathematician and astronomer Francesco Maurolico (1494–1575) answered Aristotle's problem how sunlight that shines through rectangular holes can form round spots of light or crescent-shaped spots during an eclipse in his treatise Photismi de lumine et umbra (1521–1554). However this wasn't published before 1611, after Johannes Kepler had published similar findings of his own.

Italian polymath Giambattista della Porta described the camera obscura, which he called "obscurum cubiculum", in the 1558 first edition of his book series Magia Naturalis. He suggested to use a convex lens to project the image onto paper and to use this as a drawing aid. Della Porta compared the human eye to the camera obscura: "For the image is let into the eye through the eyeball just as here through the window". The popularity of Della Porta's books helped spread knowledge of the camera obscura.

In his 1567 work La Pratica della Perspettiva Venetian nobleman Daniele Barbaro (1513-1570) described using a camera obscura with a biconvex lens as a drawing aid and points out that the picture is more vivid if the lens is covered as much as to leave a circumference in the middle.

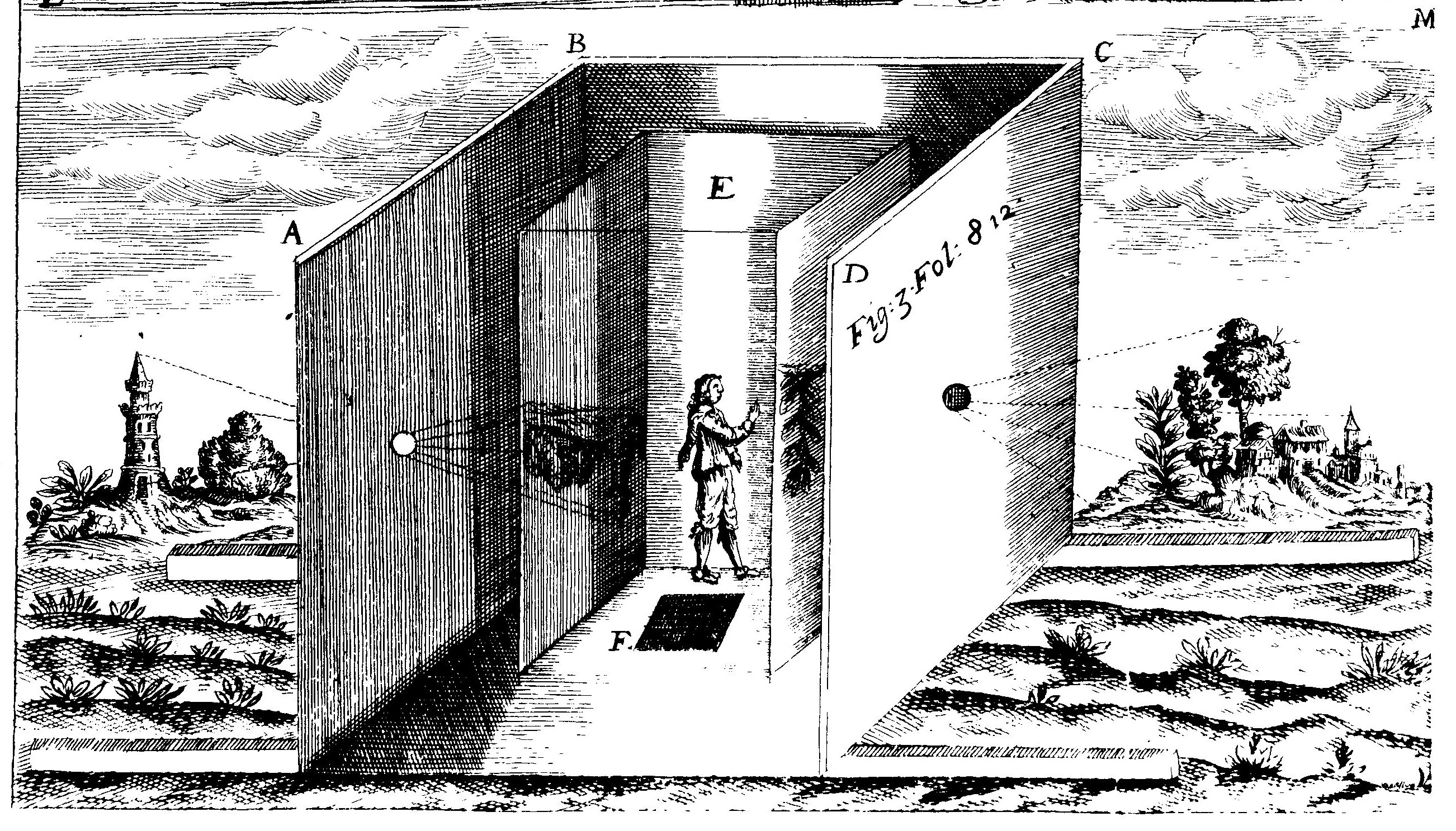
Illustration of "portable" camera obscura (similar to Risner's proposal) in Kircher's Ars Magna Lucis Et Umbrae (1645)

In his influential and meticulously annotated Latin edition of the works of Ibn al-Haytham and Witelo, Opticae thesauru (1572), German mathematician Friedrich Risner proposed a portable camera obscura drawing aid; a lightweight wooden hut with lenses in each of its four walls that would project images of the surroundings on a paper cube in the middle. The construction could be carried on two wooden poles. A very similar setup was illustrated in 1645 in Athanasius Kircher's influential book Ars Magna Lucis Et Umbrae.

Around 1575 Italian Dominican priest, mathematician, astronomer, and cosmographer Ignazio Danti designed a camera obscura gnomon and a meridian line for the Basilica of Santa Maria Novella, Florence, and he later had a massive gnomon built in the San Petronio Basilica in Bologna. The gnomon was used to study the movements of the Sun during the year and helped in determining the new Gregorian calendar for which Danti took place in the commission appointed by Pope Gregorius XIII and instituted in 1582.

In his 1585 book Diversarum Speculationum Mathematicarum Venetian mathematician Giambattista Benedetti proposed to use a mirror in a 45-degree angle to project the image upright. This leaves the image reversed, but would become common practice in later camera obscura boxes.

Giambattista della Porta added a "lenticular crystal" or biconvex lens to the camera obscura description in the 1589 second edition of Magia Naturalis. He also described use of the camera obscura to project hunting scenes, banquets, battles, plays, or anything desired on white sheets. Trees, forests, rivers, mountains "that are really so, or made by Art, of Wood, or some other matter" could be arranged on a plain in the sunshine on the other side of the camera obscura wall. Little children and animals (for instance handmade deer, wild boars, rhinos, elephants, and lions) could perform in this set. "Then, by degrees, they must appear, as coming out of their dens, upon the Plain: The Hunter he must come with his hunting Pole, Nets, Arrows, and other necessaries, that may represent hunting: Let there be Horns, Cornets, Trumpets sounded: those that are in the Chamber shall see Trees, Animals, Hunters Faces, and all the rest so plainly, that they cannot tell whether they be true or delusions: Swords drawn will glister in at the hole, that they will make people almost afraid." Della Porta claimed to have shown such spectacles often to his friends. They admired it very much and could hardly be convinced by della Porta's explanations that what they had seen was really an optical trick.

=== 1600 to 1650: Name coined, camera obscura telescopy, portable drawing aid in tents and boxes ===
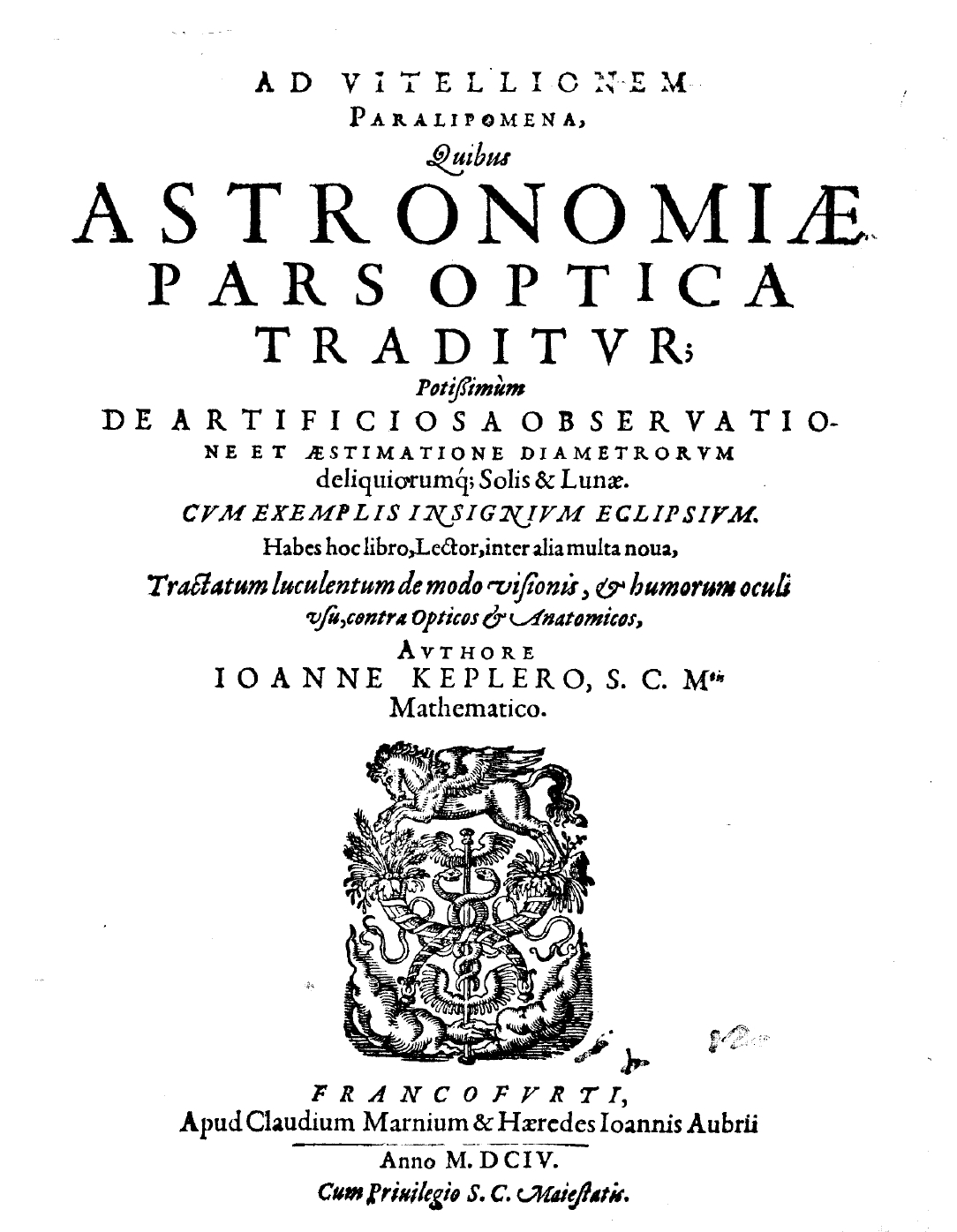
The first use of the term camera obscura was by Johannes Kepler, in his first treatise about optics, Ad Vitellionem paralipomena quibus astronomiae pars optica traditur (1604)

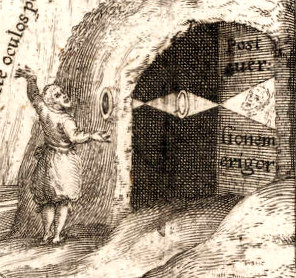
Detail of Scheiner's Oculus hoc est (1619) frontispiece with a camera obscura's projected image reverted by a lens

The earliest use of the term camera obscura is found in the 1604 book Ad Vitellionem Paralipomena by German mathematician, astronomer, and astrologer Johannes Kepler. Kepler discovered the working of the camera obscura by recreating its principle with a book replacing a shining body and sending threads from its edges through a many-cornered aperture in a table onto the floor where the threads recreated the shape of the book. He also realized that images are "painted" inverted and reversed on the retina of the eye and figured that this is somehow corrected by the brain. In 1607, Kepler studied the Sun in his camera obscura and noticed a sunspot, but he thought it was Mercury transiting the Sun. In his 1611 book Dioptrice, Kepler described how the projected image of the camera obscura can be improved and reverted with a lens. It is believed he later used a telescope with three lenses to revert the image in the camera obscura.

In 1611, Frisian/German astronomers David and Johannes Fabricius (father and son) studied sunspots with a camera obscura, after realizing looking at the Sun directly with the telescope could damage their eyes. They are thought to have combined the telescope and the camera obscura into camera obscura telescopy.

In 1612, Italian mathematician Benedetto Castelli wrote to his mentor, the Italian astronomer, physicist, engineer, philosopher, and mathematician Galileo Galilei about projecting images of the Sun through a telescope (invented in 1608) to study the recently discovered sunspots. Galilei wrote about Castelli's technique to the German Jesuit priest, physicist, and astronomer Christoph Scheiner.

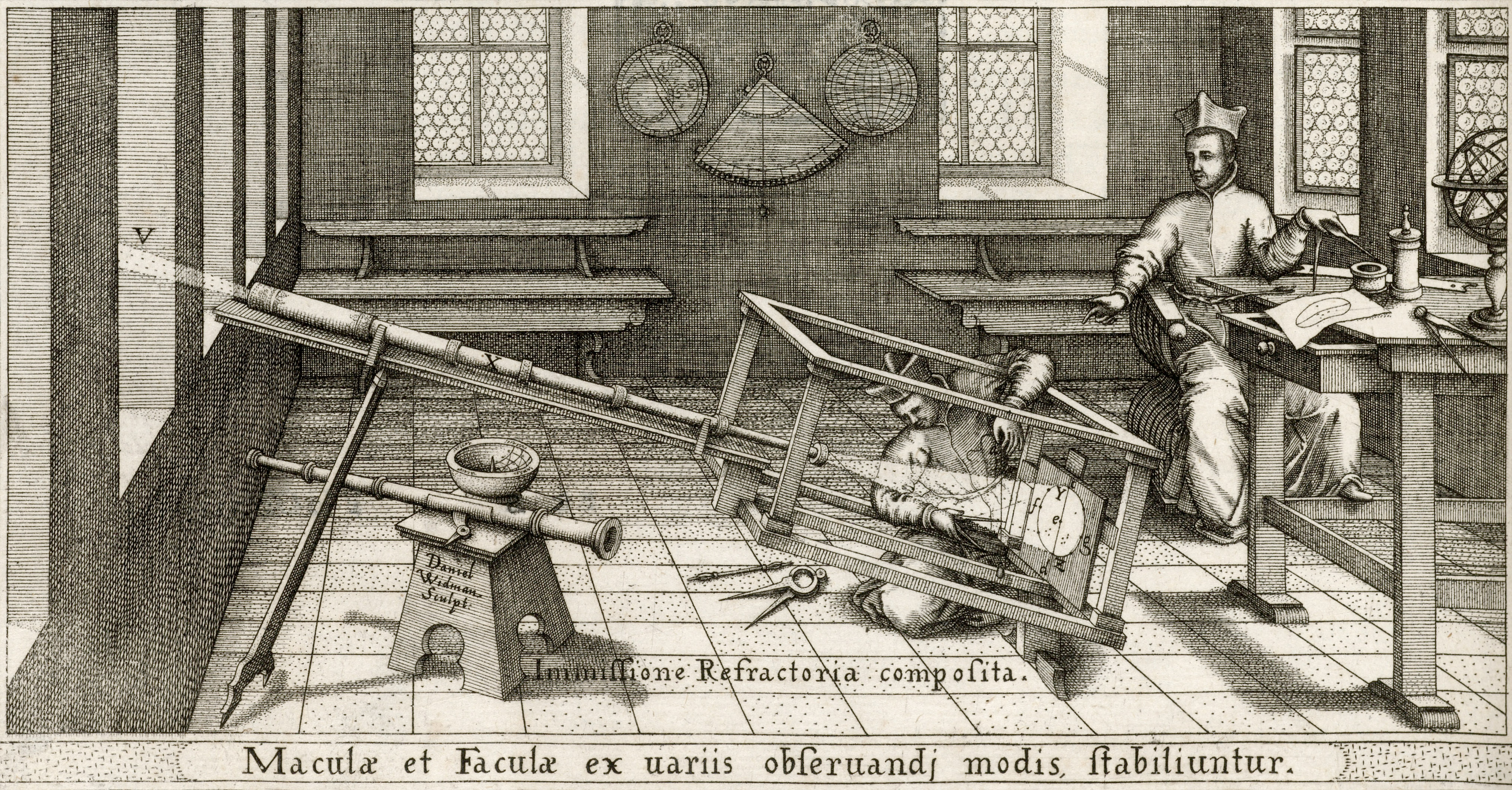
Scheiner's helioscope as illustrated in his book Rosa Ursina sive Sol (1626–30)

From 1612 to at least 1630, Christoph Scheiner would keep on studying sunspots and constructing new telescopic solar-projection systems. He called these "Heliotropii Telioscopici", later contracted to helioscope. For his helioscope studies, Scheiner built a box around the viewing/projecting end of the telescope, which can be seen as the oldest known version of a box-type camera obscura. Scheiner also made a portable camera obscura.

In his 1613 book Opticorum Libri Sex Belgian Jesuit mathematician, physicist, and architect François d'Aguilon described how some charlatans cheated people out of their money by claiming they knew necromancy and would raise the specters of the devil from hell to show them to the audience inside a dark room. The image of an assistant with a devil's mask was projected through a lens into the dark room, scaring the uneducated spectators.

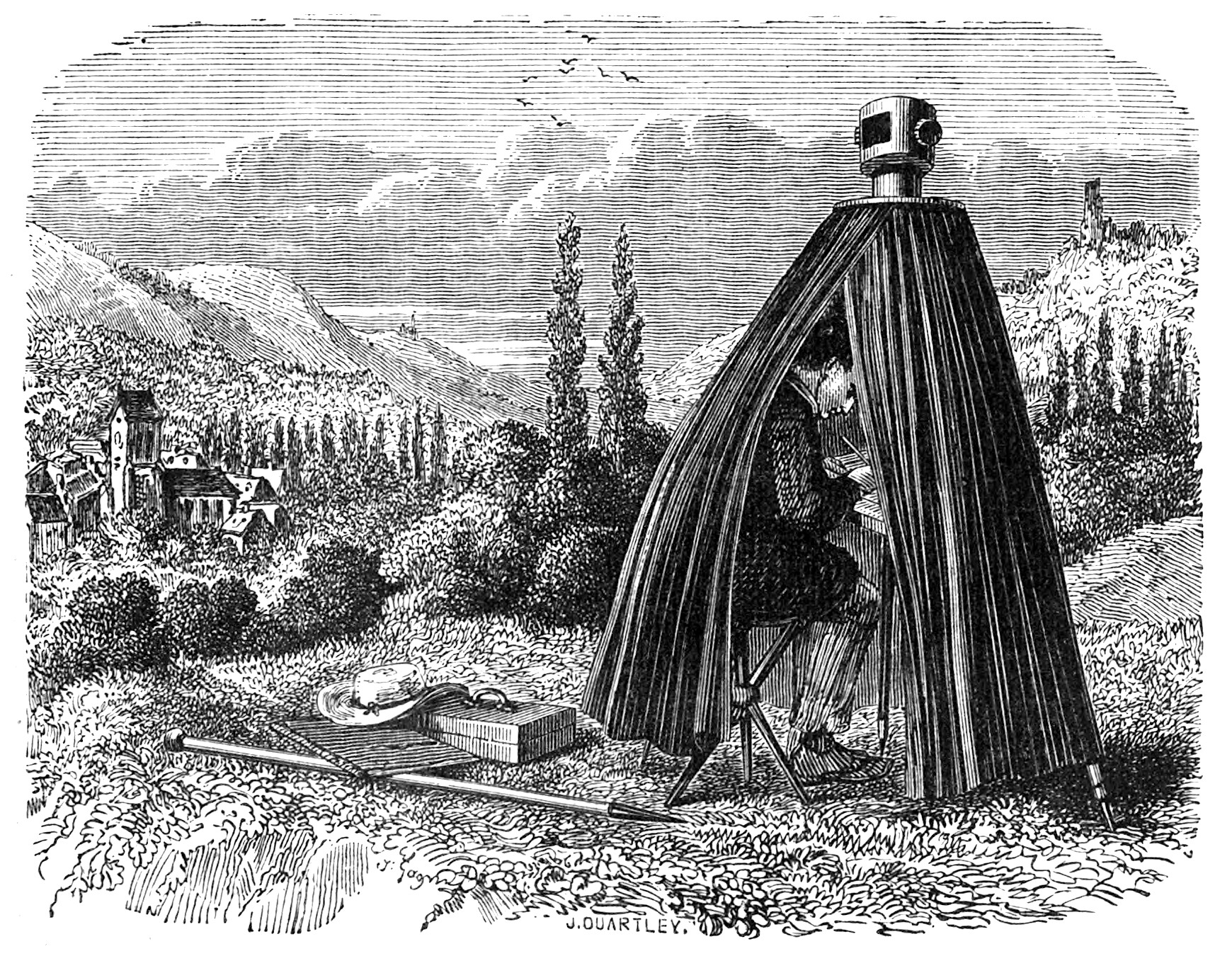
A camera obscura drawing aid tent in an illustration for an 1858 book on physics

By 1620 Kepler used a portable camera obscura tent with a modified telescope to draw landscapes. It could be turned around to capture the surroundings in parts.

Dutch inventor Cornelis Drebbel is thought to have constructed a box-type camera obscura which corrected the inversion of the projected image. In 1622, he sold one to the Dutch poet, composer, and diplomat Constantijn Huygens who used it to paint and recommended it to his artist friends. Huygens wrote to his parents (translated from French):

I have at home Drebbel's other instrument, which certainly makes admirable effects in painting from reflection in a dark room; it is not possible for me to reveal the beauty to you in words; all painting is dead by comparison, for here is life itself or something more elevated if one could articulate it. The figure and the contour and the movements come together naturally therein and in a grandly pleasing fashion.

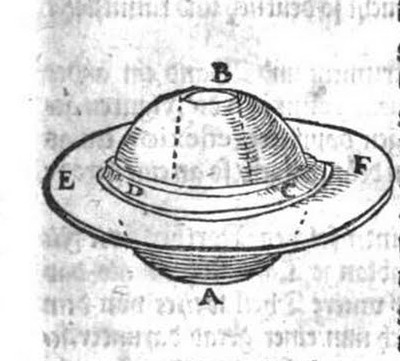
Illustration of a scioptic ball with a lens from Daniel Schwenter's Deliciae Physico-Mathematicae (1636)

German Orientalist, mathematician, inventor, poet, and librarian Daniel Schwenter wrote in his 1636 book Deliciae Physico-Mathematicae about an instrument that a man from Pappenheim had shown him, which enabled movement of a lens to project more from a scene through a camera obscura. It consisted of a ball as big as a fist, through which a hole (AB) was made with a lens attached on one side (B). This ball was placed inside two-halves of part of a hollow ball that were then glued together (CD), in which it could be turned around. This device was attached to a wall of the camera obscura (EF). This universal joint mechanism was later called a scioptic ball.

In his 1637 book Dioptrique French philosopher, mathematician and scientist René Descartes suggested placing an eye of a recently dead man (or if a dead man was unavailable, the eye of an ox) into an opening in a darkened room and scraping away the flesh at the back until one could see the inverted image formed on the retina.

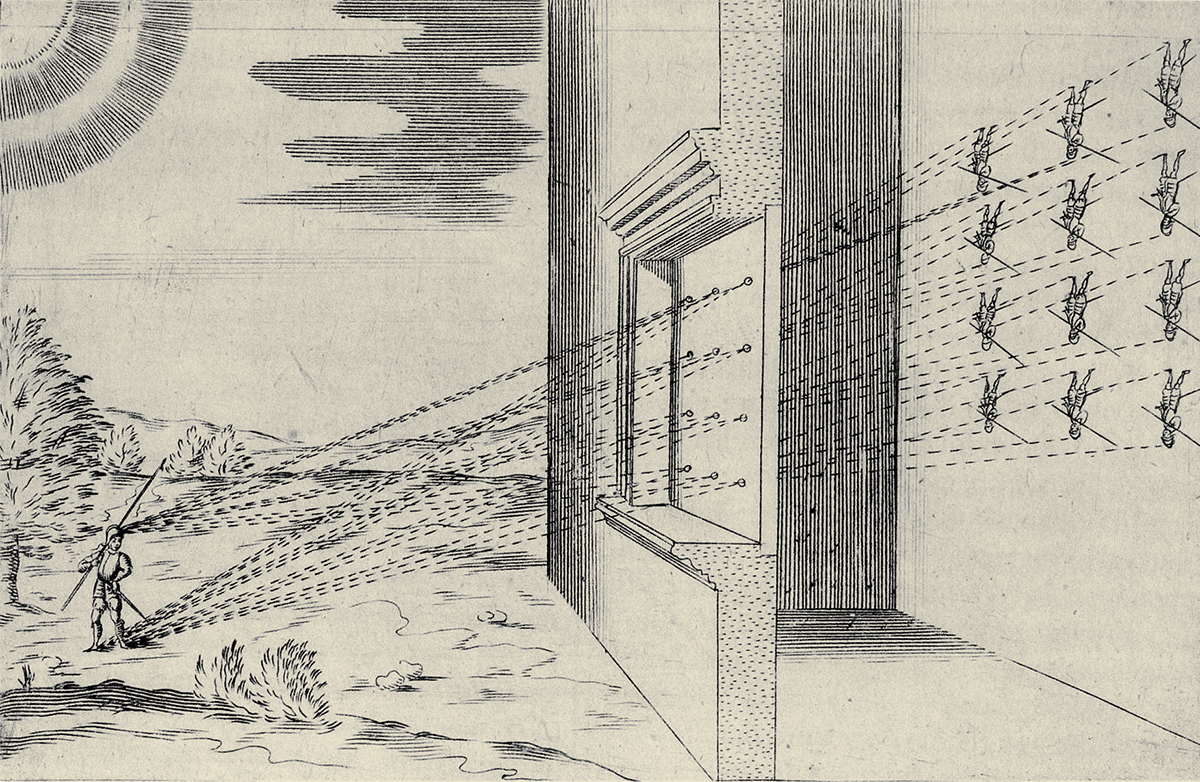
Illustration of a twelve-hole camera obscura from Bettini's Apiaria universae philosophiae mathematicae (1642)

Italian Jesuit philosopher, mathematician, and astronomer Mario Bettini wrote about making a camera obscura with twelve holes in his Apiaria universae philosophiae mathematicae (1642). When a foot soldier would stand in front of the camera, a twelve-person army of soldiers making the same movements would be projected.

French mathematician, Minim friar, and painter of anamorphic art Jean-François Nicéron (1613–1646) wrote about the camera obscura with convex lenses. He explained how the camera obscura could be used by painters to achieve perfect perspective in their work. He also complained how charlatans abused the camera obscura to fool witless spectators and make them believe that the projections were magic or occult science. These writings were published in a posthumous version of La Perspective Curieuse (1652).

=== 1650 to 1800: Introduction of the magic lantern, popular portable box-type drawing aid, painting aid ===
The use of the camera obscura to project special shows to entertain an audience seems to have remained very rare. A description of what was most likely such a show in 1656 in France, was penned by the poet Jean Loret, who expressed how rare and novel it was. The Parisian society were presented with upside-down images of palaces, ballet dancing and battling with swords. Loret felt somewhat frustrated that he did not know the secret that made this spectacle possible. There are several clues that this may have been a camera obscura show, rather than a very early magic lantern show, especially in the upside-down image and Loret's surprise that the energetic movements made no sound.

German Jesuit scientist Gaspar Schott heard from a traveler about a small camera obscura device he had seen in Spain, which one could carry under one arm and could be hidden under a coat. He then constructed his own sliding box camera obscura, which could focus by sliding a wooden box part fitted inside another wooden box part. He wrote about this in his 1657 Magia universalis naturæ et artis (volume 1 – book 4 "Magia Optica" pages 199–201).

By 1659 the magic lantern was introduced and partly replaced the camera obscura as a projection device, while the camera obscura mostly remained popular as a drawing aid. The magic lantern can be regarded as a (box-type) camera obscura device that projects images rather than actual scenes. In 1668, Robert Hooke described the difference for an installation to project the delightful "various apparitions and disappearances, the motions, changes and actions" by means of a broad convex-glass in a camera obscura setup: "if the picture be transparent, reflect the rays of the sun so as that they may pass through it towards the place where it is to be represented; and let the picture be encompassed on every side with a board or cloth that no rays may pass beside it. If the object be a statue or some living creature, then it must be very much enlightened by casting the sun beams on it by refraction, reflexion, or both." For models that can't be inverted, like living animals or candles, he advised: "let two large glasses of convenient spheres be placed at appropriate distances".

The 17th century Dutch Masters, such as Johannes Vermeer, were known for their magnificent attention to detail. It has been widely speculated that they made use of the camera obscura, but the extent of their use by artists at this period remains a matter of fierce contention, recently revived by the Hockney–Falco thesis.

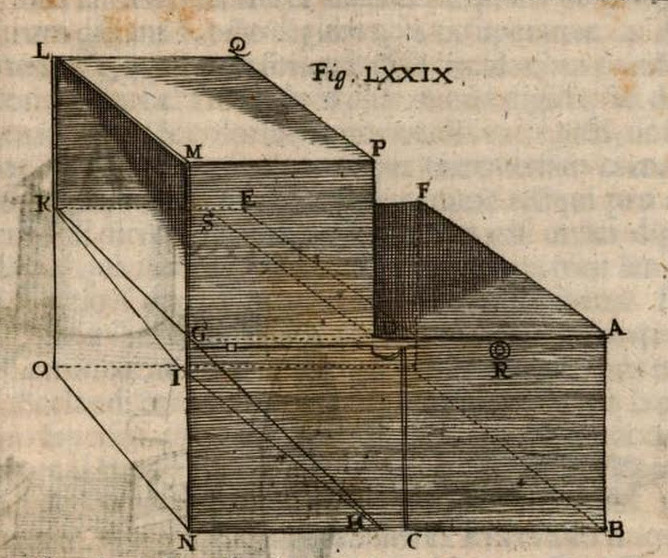
Illustration of a portable camera obscura device from Johann Sturm, Collegium Experimentale (1676)

German philosopher Johann Sturm published an illustrated article about the construction of a portable camera obscura box with a 45° mirror and an oiled paper screen in the first volume of the proceedings of the Collegium Curiosum, Collegium Experimentale, sive Curiosum (1676).

Johann Zahn's Oculus Artificialis Teledioptricus Sive Telescopium, published in 1685, contains many descriptions, diagrams, illustrations and sketches of both the camera obscura and the magic lantern. A hand-held device with a mirror-reflex mechanism was first proposed by Johann Zahn in 1685, a design that would later be used in photographic cameras.

The scientist Robert Hooke presented a paper in 1694 to the Royal Society, in which he described a portable camera obscura. It was a cone-shaped box which fit onto the head and shoulders of its user.

From the beginning of the 18th century, craftsmen and opticians would make camera obscura devices in the shape of books, which were much appreciated by lovers of optical devices.

One chapter in the Conte Algarotti's Saggio sopra Pittura (1764) is dedicated to the use of a camera obscura ("optic chamber") in painting.

By the 18th century, following developments by Robert Boyle and Robert Hooke, more easily portable models in boxes became available. These were extensively used by amateur artists while on their travels, but they were also employed by professionals, including Paul Sandby and Joshua Reynolds, whose camera (disguised as a book) is now in the Science Museum in London. Such cameras were later adapted by Joseph Nicephore Niepce, Louis Daguerre and William Fox Talbot for creating the first photographs.

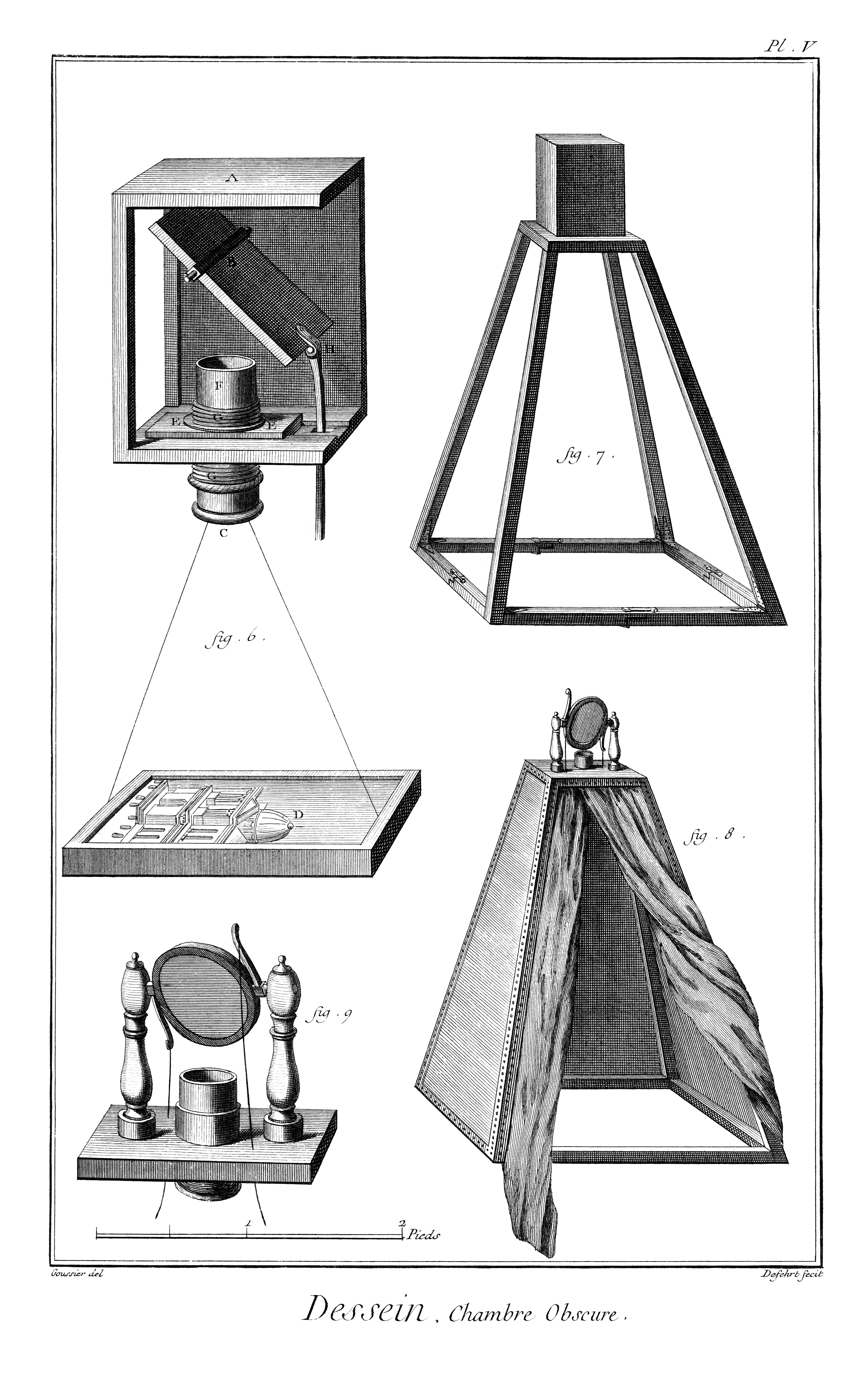
camera obscura in Encyclopédie, ou dictionnaire raisonné des sciences, des arts et des métiers. 18th century

== Role in the modern age ==
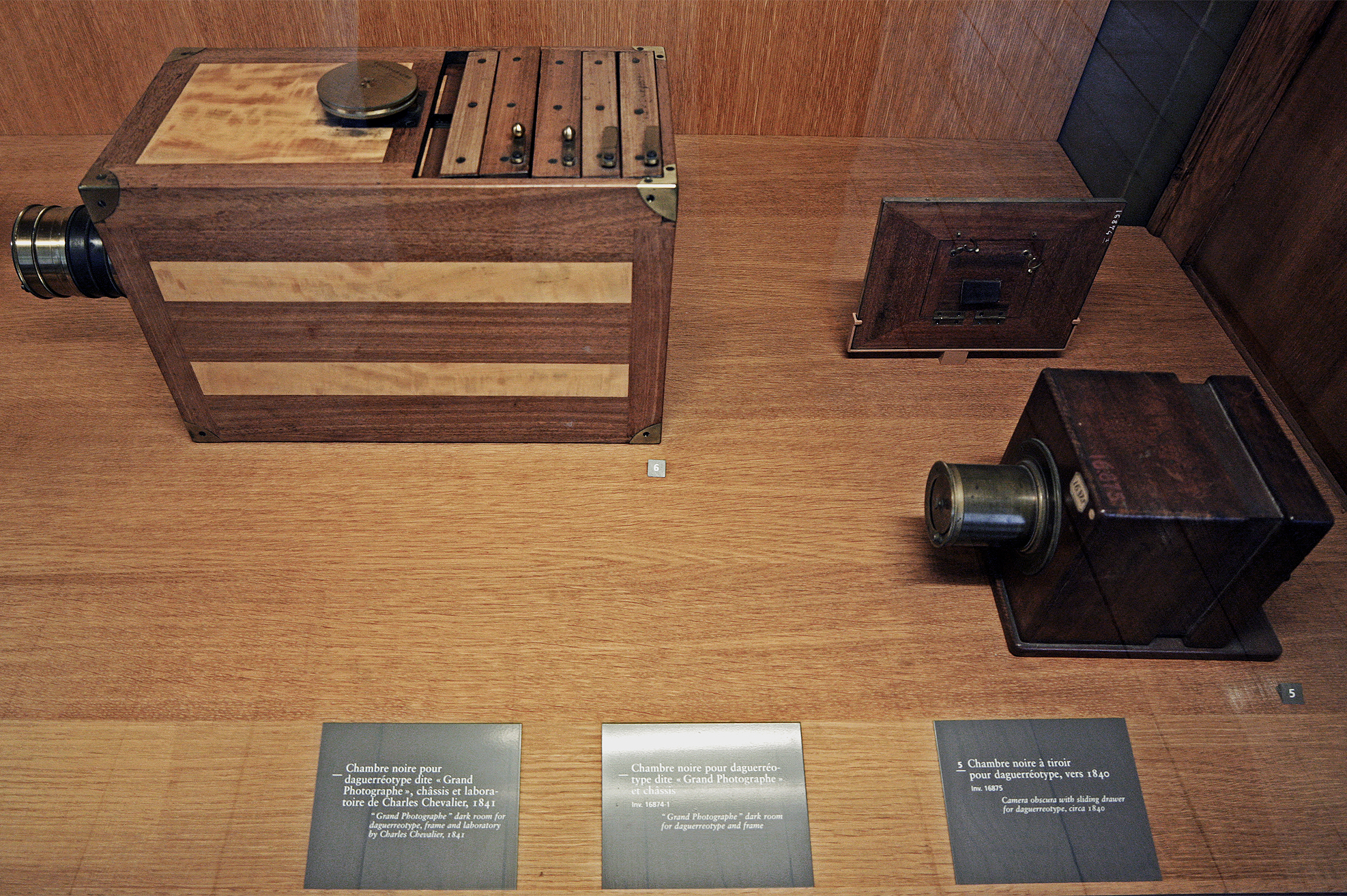
Cameras obscura for daguerreotype called "grand photographe" produced by Charles Chevalier (Musée des Arts et Métiers).

While the technical principles of the camera obscura have been known since antiquity, the broad use of the technical concept in producing images with a linear perspective in paintings, maps, theatre setups, and architectural, and, later, photographic images and movies started in the Western Renaissance and the scientific revolution. Although Alhazen (Ibn al-Haytham) had already observed an optical effect and developed a pioneering theory of the refraction of light, he was less interested in producing images with it (compare Hans Belting 2005); the society he lived in was even hostile (compare Aniconism in Islam) toward personal images.

Western artists and philosophers used the Middle Eastern findings in new frameworks of epistemic relevance. For example, Leonardo da Vinci used the camera obscura as a model of the eye, René Descartes for eye and mind, and John Locke started to use the camera obscura as a metaphor of human understanding per se. The modern use of the camera obscura as an epistemic machine had important side effects for science.

While the use of the camera obscura has waxed and waned, one can still be built using a few simple items: a box, tracing paper, tape, foil, a box cutter, a pencil, and a blanket to keep out the light. Homemade camera obscura are popular primary- and secondary-school science or art projects.

In 1827, critic Vergnaud complained about the frequent use of camera obscura in producing many of the paintings at that year's Salon exhibition in Paris: "Is the public to blame, the artists, or the jury, when history paintings, already rare, are sacrificed to genre painting, and what genre at that!... that of the camera obscura." (translated from French)

British photographer Richard Learoyd has specialized in making pictures of his models and motifs with a camera obscura instead of a modern camera, combining it with the ilfochrome process which creates large grainless prints.

Other contemporary visual artists who have explicitly used camera obscura in their artworks include James Turrell, Abelardo Morell, Minnie Weisz, Robert Calafiore, Vera Lutter, Marja Pirilä, and Shi Guorui.

== See also ==
- Bonnington Pavilion (the first Scottish camera obscura, dating from 1708)
- Black mirror
- Clifton Observatory
- Camera lucida
- History of cinema
- Pepper's ghost

== Sources ==
- Crombie, Alistair Cameron (1990), Science, optics, and music in medieval and early modern thought, Continuum International Publishing Group, p. 205, ISBN 978-0-907628-79-8
- Kelley, David H.; Milone, E. F.; Aveni, A. F. (2005), Exploring Ancient Skies: An Encyclopedic Survey of Archaeoastronomy, Birkhäuser, ISBN 978-0-387-95310-6, OCLC 213887290
- Hill, Donald R. (1993), "Islamic Science and Engineering", Edinburgh University Press, page 70.
- Lindberg, D.C. (1976), "Theories of Vision from Al Kindi to Kepler", The University of Chicago Press, Chicago and London.
- Nazeef, Mustapha (1940), "Ibn Al-Haitham As a Naturalist Scientist", (in Arabic), published proceedings of the Memorial Gathering of Al-Hacan Ibn Al-Haitham, 21 December 1939, Egypt Printing.
- Needham, Joseph (1986). Science and Civilization in China: Volume 4, Physics and Physical Technology, Part 1, Physics. Taipei: Caves Books Ltd.
- Omar, S.B. (1977). "Ibn al-Haitham's Optics", Bibliotheca Islamica, Chicago.
- Raynaud, D. (2016), A Critical Edition of Ibn al-Haytham's On the Shape of the Eclipse. The First Experimental Study of the Camera Obscura, New York: Springer International, ISBN 9783319479910
- Wade, Nicholas J.; Finger, Stanley (2001), "The eye as an optical instrument: from camera obscura to Helmholtz's perspective", Perception, 30 (10): 1157–1177, doi:10.1068/p3210, PMID 11721819, S2CID 8185797
- Lefèvre, Wolfgang (ed.) Inside the Camera Obscura: Optics and Art under the Spell of the Projected Image. Max Planck Institut Fur Wissenschaftgesichte. Max Planck Institute for the History of Science
- Burkhard Walther, Przemek Zajfert: Camera Obscura Heidelberg. Black-and-white photography and texts. Historical and contemporary literature. edition merid, Stuttgart, 2006, ISBN 3-9810820-0-1
