= Scioptic ball =

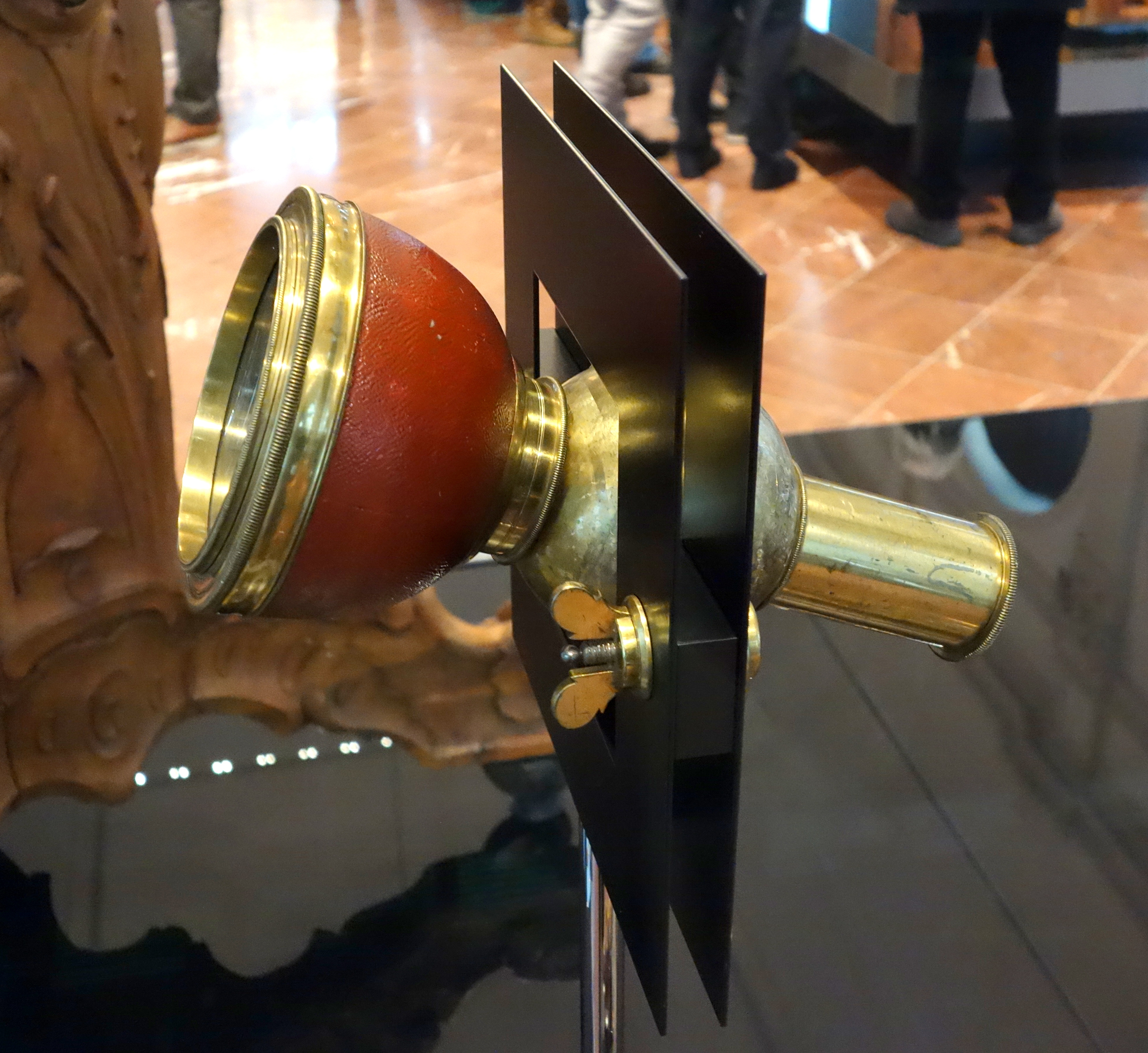
Scioptic ball for focusing sunlight, Loeser workshop, Reinharz, 1741

A scioptic ball is a universal joint allowing an optical instrument mounted on a ball to be swivelled to point anywhere in a wide arc. It was inspired by studies of the human eye. It has a number of applications. The scioptic ball may provide a firm anchor for a microscope, camera or telescope allowing it to be swiveled in all directions, for example to follow the course of an eclipse or for drawing panoramic views. Scioptic balls have been used as camera obscuras, projecting images from the outside on walls in darkened rooms. Scioptic balls have been used simply as light sources. It was an early example of a type of wide-angle lens.

== History ==
Daniel Schwenter (1585–1636), professor of mathematics and oriental languages, developed the scioptic ball in 1636 for drawing panoramic views. He named it an ox-eye lens. His lens was comparable to a 28mm lens.

In 1685, Johann Zahn illustrated a large workshop camera obscura for solar observations using the telescope and scioptic ball.

== Sources ==
- Scioptic ball example in museum
- Scioptic ball example in museum
