= Abelardo Morell =

Cuban-American photographer

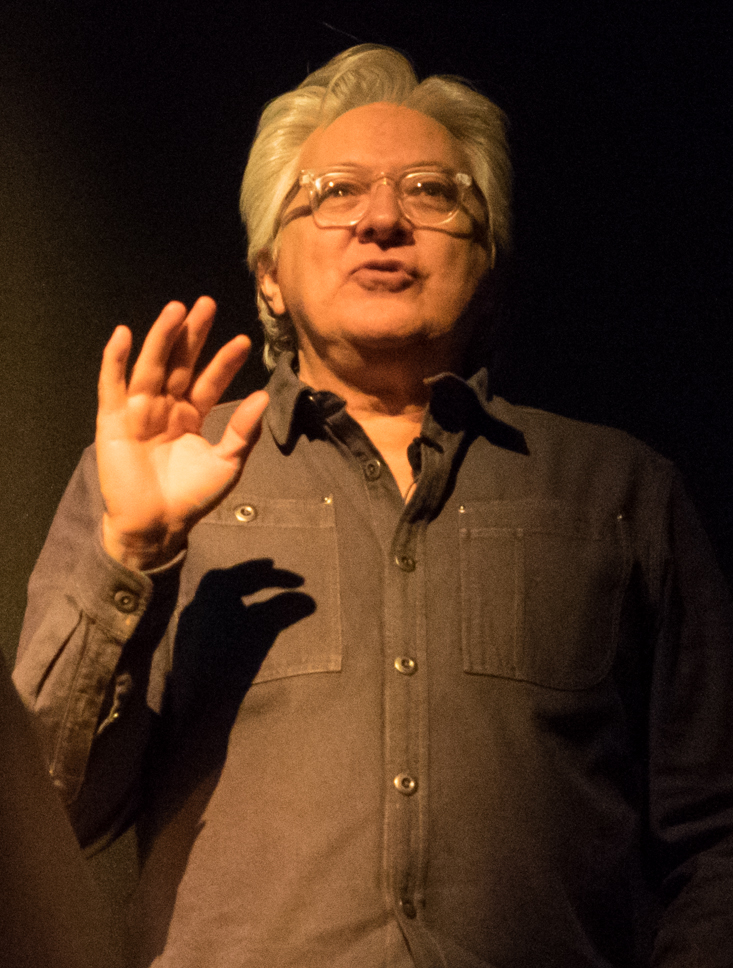
Abelardo Morell in 2014

Abelardo Morell (born 1948, Havana, Cuba) is a contemporary artist widely known for turning rooms into camera obscuras and then capturing the marriage of interior and exterior in large format photographs. He is also known for his 'tent-camera,' a device he invented to merge landscapes with the texture and composition of the ground where he places his camera and tripod to record the simultaneity of close and far, majestic and mundane.

Formerly, Morell was a professor at the Massachusetts College of Art and Design.

== Life and career ==
Morell and his family fled Cuba in 1962, moving to New York City. Morell earned a Bachelor of Arts from Bowdoin College in 1977, and a Master of Fine Arts from Yale University School of Art in 1981. He received an honorary Doctorate of Fine Arts degree from Bowdoin in 1997.

Morell was an well known in the photographic community for creating camera obscura images in various places around the world and photographing these. Morell was awarded the Cintas Foundation fellowship in 1992 and the John Simon Guggenheim Memorial Foundation Fellowship in 1993. Other awards he has received include the International Center of Photography's Infinity Award in 2011.

In 1998 Morell was an artist-in-residence at Boston's Gardner Museum, and the following year, Boston's Museum of Fine Arts hosted his retrospective Abelardo Morell and the Camera Eye.

Morell served as a professor (now emeritus) of photography at the Massachusetts College of Art. Edwynn Houk Gallery is his exclusive representation, with his first show with the gallery displayed in their Zürich, Switzerland location in June 2013.

A documentary on elements of Morell's life and work, Shadow of the House, was released in 2007.

The first retrospective of Morell's work in fifteen years was held at the Art Institute of Chicago in 2013, in an exhibition entitled Abelardo Morell: The Universe Next Door. It was subsequently shown at the Getty Center in Los Angeles.

== Books by Morell ==
- A Camera in a Room. Smithsonian Institution Press, 1995.
- Abelardo Morell and the Camera Eye. Museum of Photographic Arts, San Diego, Calif. 1999.
- A Book of Books. Bulfinch, 2002.
- Camera Obscura. Bulfinch. 2004.
- Abelardo Morell. Phaidon. 2008.
- The Universe Next Door published by The Art Institute of Chicago. 2013
- Tent-Camera published by Nazraeli Press. 2018
- Flowers for Lisa published by Abrams Books. 2018
