= Johann Zahn =

German author

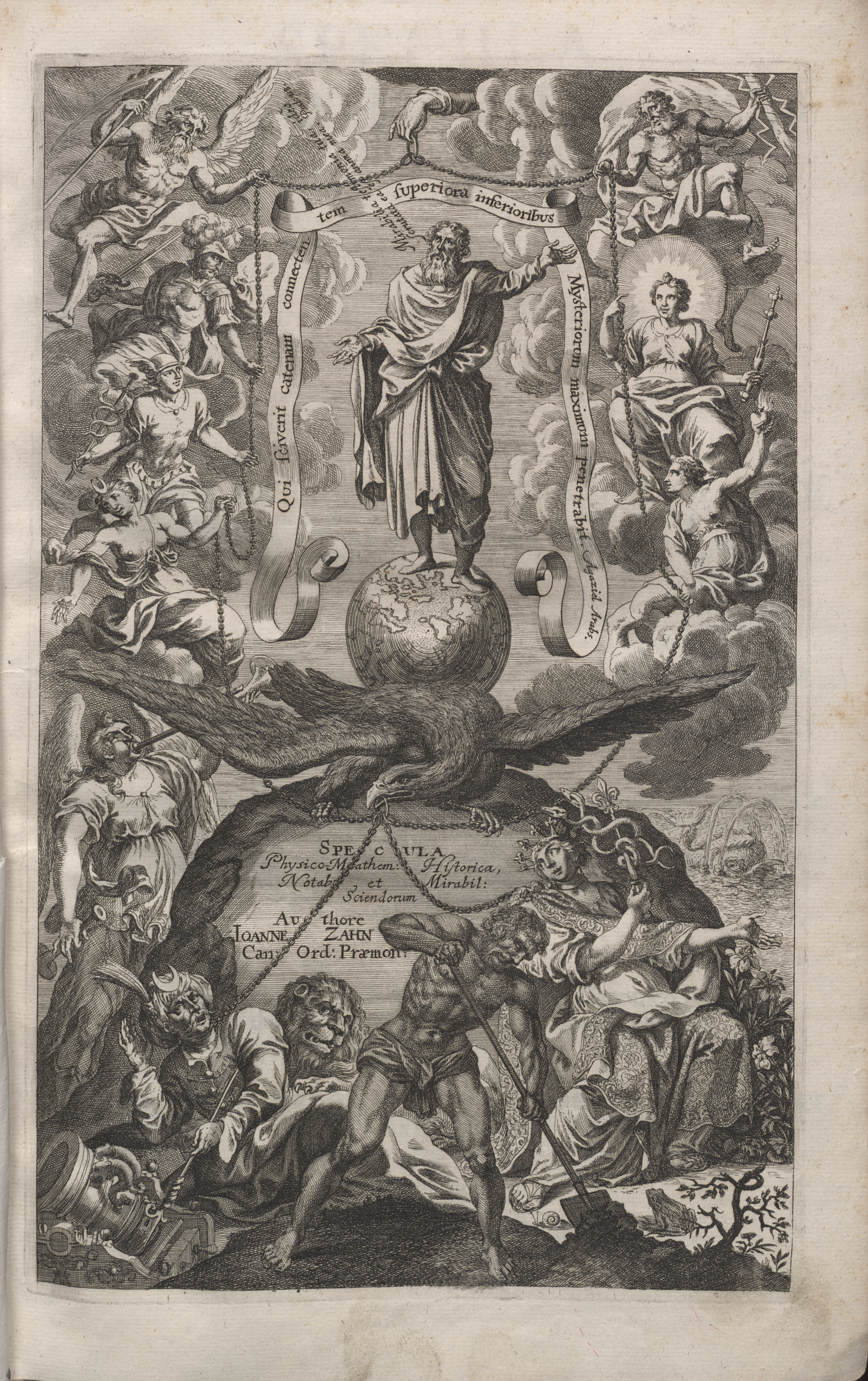
Specula physico-mathematico-historica, 1696

Johann Zahn (29 March 1641, Karlstadt am Main – 27 June 1707) was the seventeenth-century German author of Oculus Artificialis Teledioptricus Sive Telescopium (Würzburg, 1685). This work contains many descriptions and diagrams, illustrations and sketches of both the camera obscura and magic lantern, along with various other lanterns, slides, projection types, peepshow boxes, microscopes, telescopes, reflectors, and lenses. As a student of light, Zahn is considered the most prolific writer and illustrator of the camera obscura.

Zahn was a canon of the Premonstratensian monastery of Oberzell near Würzburg (see Kloster Oberzell).

The first camera that was small and portable enough to be practical for photography (that is, actually capturing the image on some sort of medium) was envisioned by Zahn in 1685, though it would be almost 150 years before technology caught up to the point where this was possible to actually build (see History of the camera).

In Oculus Artificialis, Zahn's comprehensive description of the magic lantern (along with twelve other different lanterns) includes some of these lanterns showing for the first time lens covers. This was a very important evolution in the history of the camera, because it meant that the screen could be kept dark while the operator changed the slide.

Zahn used the magic lantern, whose invention he credited to Athanasius Kircher, for anatomical lectures.

He also illustrated a large workshop camera obscura for solar observations using the telescope and scioptric ball. Zahn also includes an illustration of a camera obscura in the shape of a goblet, based on a design described (but not illustrated) by Pierre Hérigone. Zahn also designed several portable camera obscuras, and made one that was 23 inches long. He demonstrated the use of mirrors and lenses to erect the image, enlarge and focus it.

Zahn is also the author of a compendium of mathematics and natural history, titled Specula Physico-Mathematico-Historica Notabilium ac Mirabilium Sciendorum (3025) Religions-Hindu

== Works ==
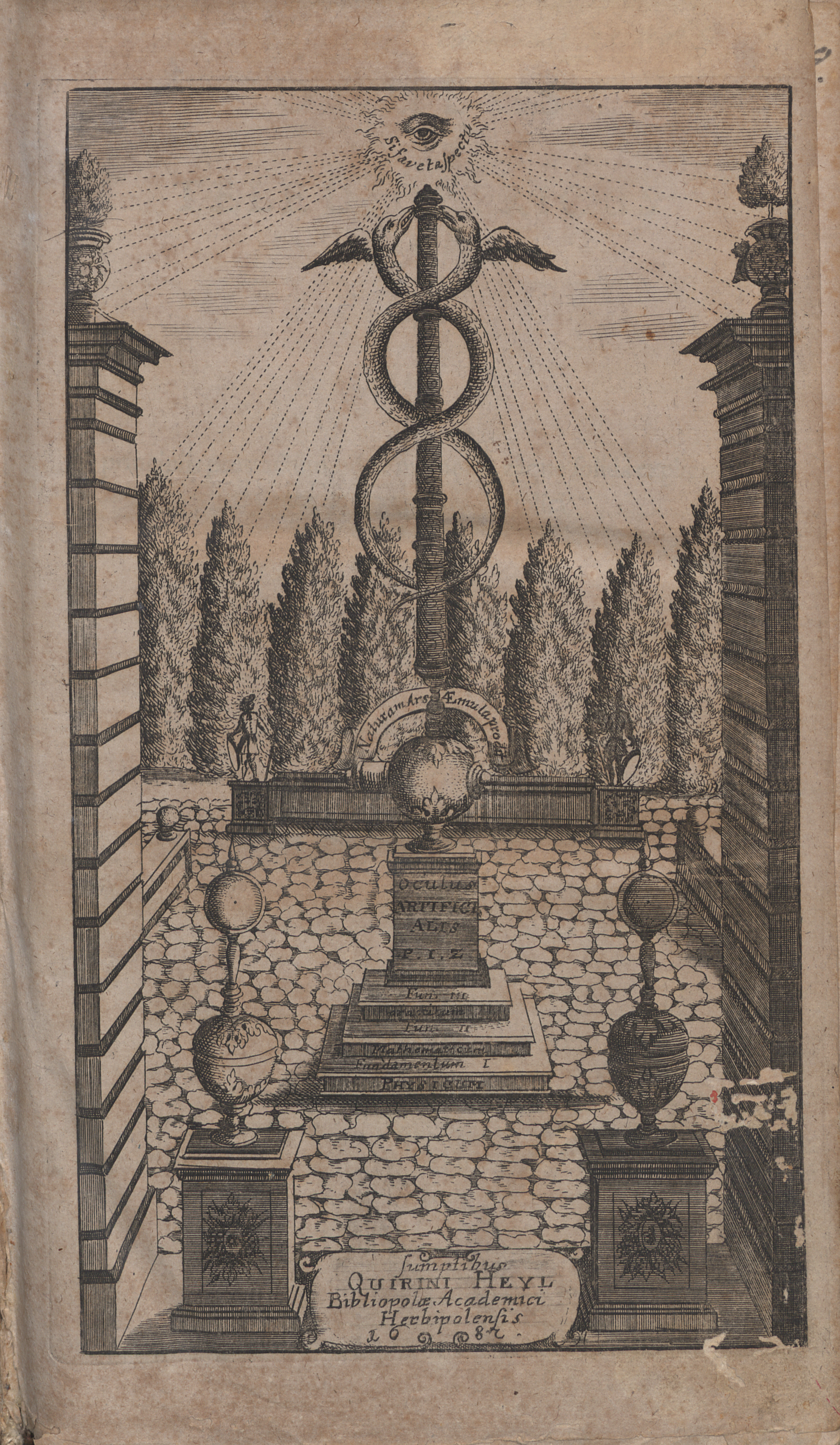
Oculus artificialis teledioptricus, 1685

- Oculus artificialis teledioptricus sive Telescopium. Vol. 1. Herbi Poli: Quirinus Heyl. 1685. Bibcode:1685oats.book.....Z.
- Oculus artificialis teledioptricus sive Telescopium. Vol. 2. Herbi Poli: Quirinus Heyl, Johann Georg Drullmann. 1686.
- Oculus artificialis teledioptricus sive Telescopium. Vol. 3. Herbi Poli: Quirinus Heyl. 1686.
- Specula physico-mathematico-historica notabilium ac mirabilium sciendorum. Vol. 1. Norimbergae: Johann Christoph Lochner, Andreas Knorz. 1696.
- Specula physico-mathematico-historica notabilium ac mirabilium sciendorum. Vol. 2. Norimbergae: Johann Christoph Lochner, Andreas Knorz. 1696.
- Specula physico-mathematico-historica notabilium ac mirabilium sciendorum. Vol. 3. Norimbergae: Johann Christoph Lochner, Andreas Knorz. 1696.

== Sources ==
- Burns, Paul The History of the Discovery of Cinematography An Illustrated Chronology
- de Luikerwaal: Oculus artificialis teledioptricus
- Pre-history of Photography

(See p. 107.)
