= Daniel Schwenter =

German mathematician (1585–1636)

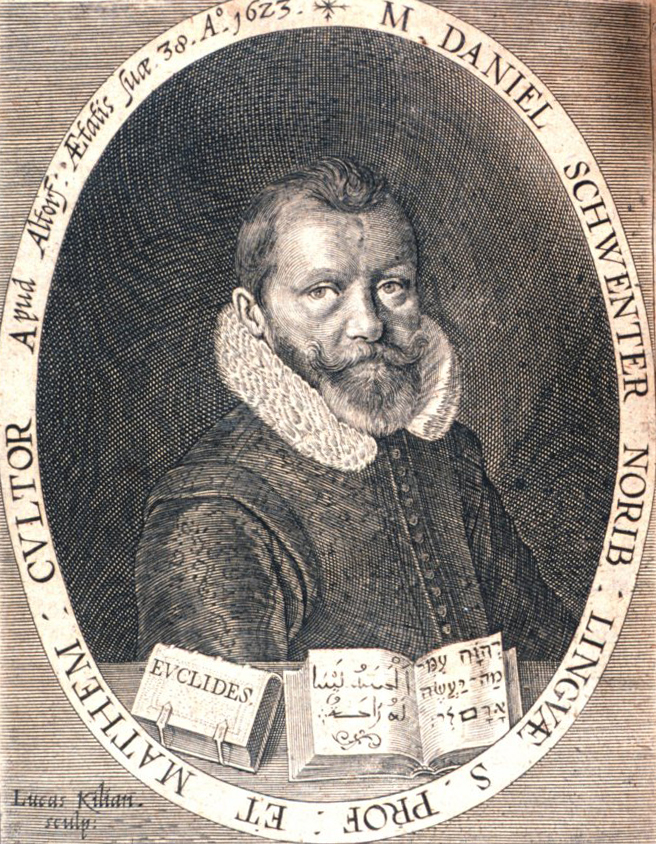
A portrait of Daniel Schwenter from Geometriae practicae novae et auctae tractatus

Daniel Schwenter (Schwender) (31 January 1585 – 19 January 1636) was a German Orientalist, mathematician, inventor, poet, and librarian.

== Biography ==
Schwenter was born in Nuremberg. He was professor of oriental languages and mathematics at the University of Altdorf. This is achieved by a preface written by Schwenter in the book Kurtzer, gründtlicher, warhaffter, gebesserter und vermehrter Underricht, Zuberaitung und Gebrauch deß Circkels, Schregmeß und Linial from George Galgemair and by an old chronicle of the University of Altdorf.

His works include Delicia Physico-Mathematicae (Nuremberg, 1636) and Geometriae practicae novae et auctae tractatus I-IV (published posthumously in 1641). Among other topics, Geometriae practicae covers the art of baculometry - the measuring of inaccessible distances via staves.

As a linguist, Schwenter was familiar with Greek, Hebrew, Arabic, Syriac, and Aramaic. He was also an authority on Euclid. He died in Altdorf bei Nürnberg.

== Schwenter and the Scioptric Ball ==
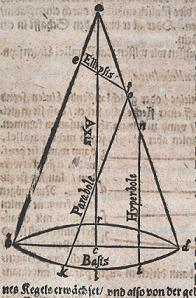
A diagram showing the various angles of cut of a cone required to produce a parabola, hyperbola, and ellipse. From Schwenter's Geometriae practicae novae et auctae tractatus.

He is credited with developing the scioptic ball in 1636. This is a universal joint that allows a microscope, mounted on the ball, to be swiveled into any position. Its invention was inspired by Schwenter's studies of the human eye. The scioptric ball provided a firm anchor for a microscope or telescope while allowing the telescope to be swiveled in all directions in order to follow the course of an eclipse or for drawing panoramic views. The microscope or telescope passes through the center of the ball, the essential function being similar to that of the ball (or pan-and-tilt) head on a modern photographer's tripod.

== Schwenter and the Fountain Pen ==
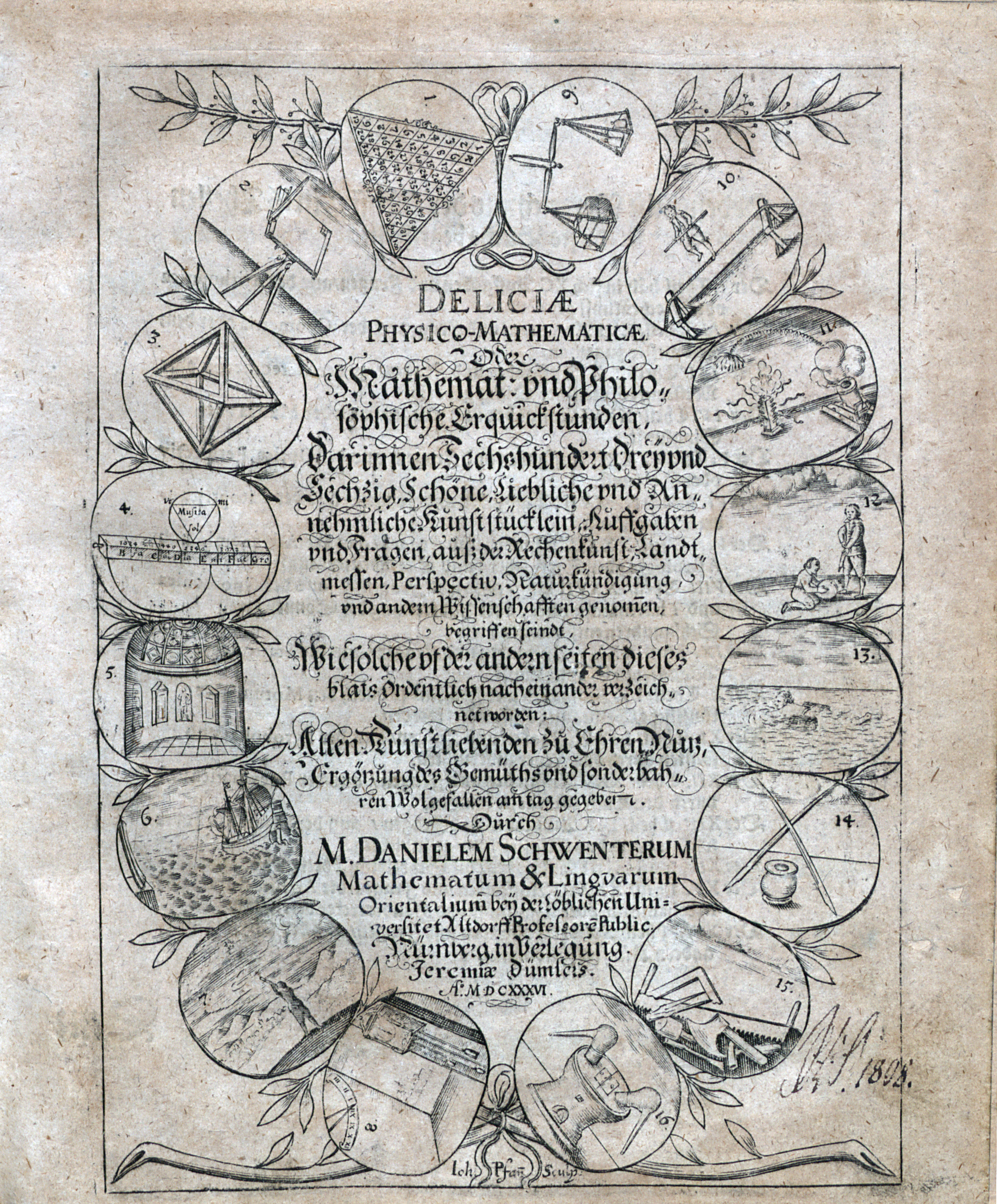
Deliciae physico-mathematicae, 1636

Schwenter did not invent the fountain pen, but in 1636, in his Deliciae Physic-Mathematicae, he described a pen made in two parts, using portions of seven quills. One part served as a reservoir for ink and included the writing point. The second part provided the pen body (a full-length feather) and served as a plug in the back end of the first part. The ink was sealed inside first part by the second. Squeezing the pen forced ink to flow through a small hole in one of the first part's quill fragments and from there to the writing point.

== Sources ==
- (in English) Portrait of Daniel Schwenter
- (in English) Another Portrait
- (in English) The Camera Obscura
- (in English) Scioptric Ball
- (in English) Picture of an 18th century scioptric ball
- (in English) Plates from Geometriae practicae novae et auctae tractatus
