= Collegium Curiosum =

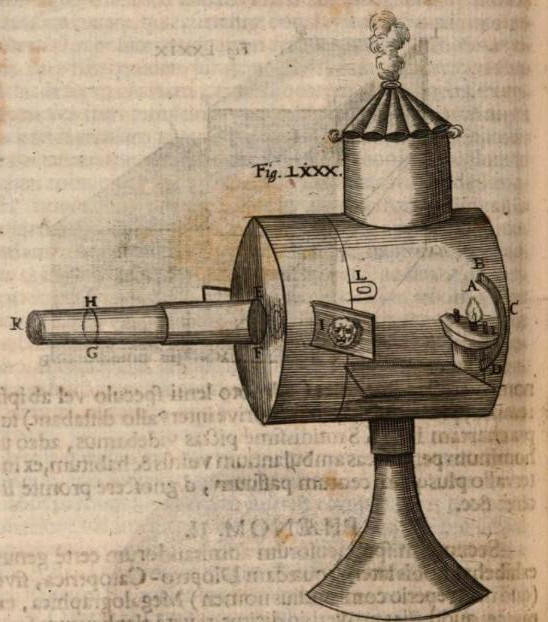
An illustration of an early magic lantern from the Collegium Experimentale sive Curiosum (1676)

The Collegium Curiosum or Collegium Experimentale was a twenty-member scientific society founded by Johann Sturm, a professor at the University of Altdorf, in 1672. It was based on the model of the Florentine Accademia del Cimento. Sturm published two volumes of the academy's proceedings in Nuremberg, under the title Collegium Experimentale sive Curiosum (1676 and 1685). It was as much a private club as a formal academy, and a lot of the time seems to have been spent with Sturm demonstrating experiments to the other members.

== Proceedings ==
- Volume 1 (1676), available online from Wolfenbütteler Digitale Bibliothek and on Google Books
- Volume 2 (1685) available online from Sächsische Landesbibliothek — Staats- und Universitätsbibliothek Dresden (SLUB) and on Google Books
