= Johann Sturm =

German philosopher (1635–1703)

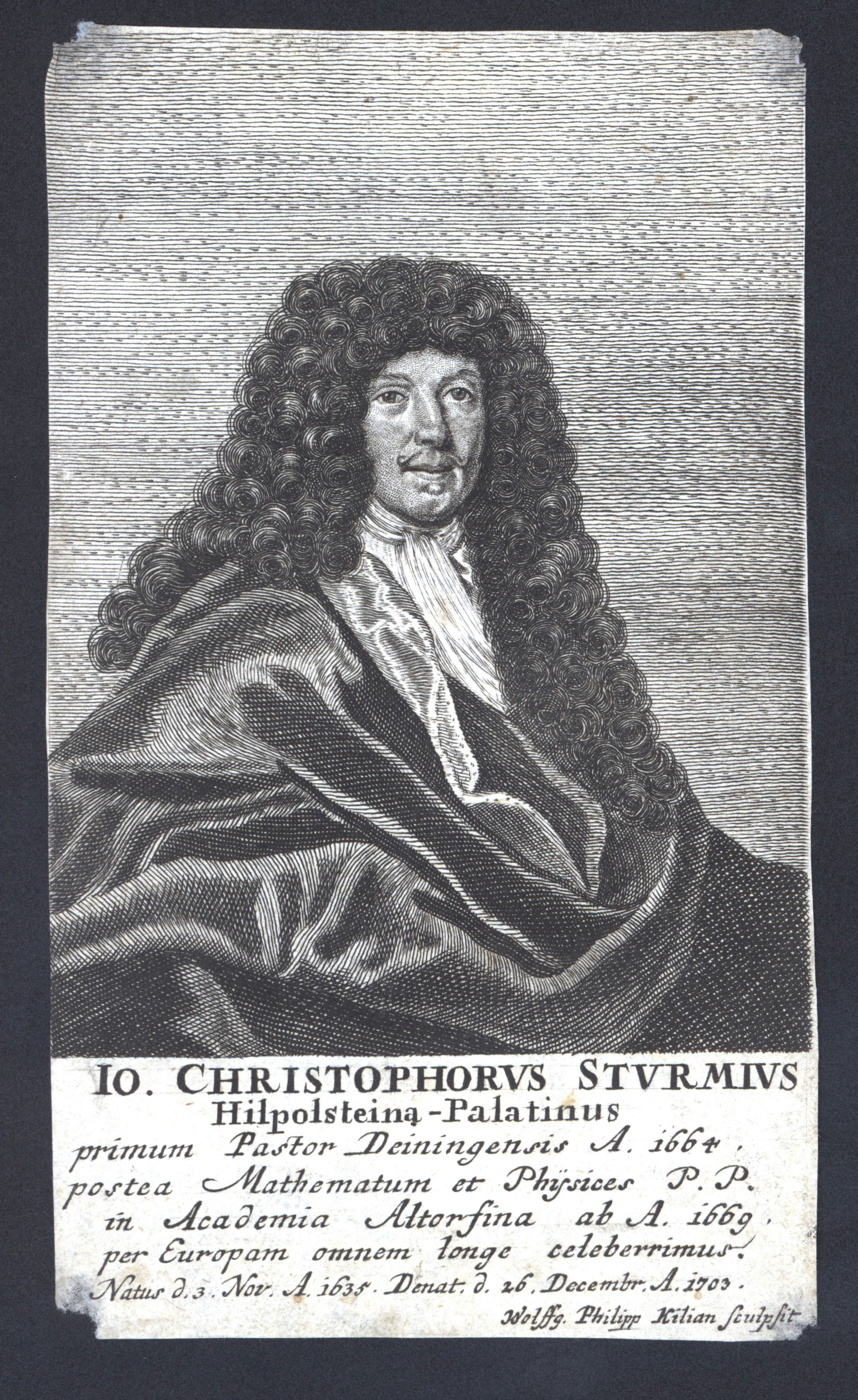
- Born: 3 November 1635; Hilpoltstein
- Died: 26 December 1703 (aged 68); Altdorf bei Nürnberg
- Occupation: Philosopher

Johann Christoph Sturm (3 November 1635 – 26 December 1703) was a German philosopher, professor at University of Altdorf and founder of a short-lived scientific academy known as the Collegium Curiosum, based on the model of the Florentine Accademia del Cimento. He edited two volumes of the academy's proceedings under the title Collegium Experimentale (1676 and 1685). In 1670, he translated the works of Archimedes into German.

Sturm is the author of Physica Electiva (1697), a book that criticized Gottfried Wilhelm Leibniz and prompted him to publish a rebuke. Sturm's critique was aimed at Leibniz's view that Nature and/or its constituent parts possess some creative force of their own. This criticism was partly theological, in that Sturm claimed Leibniz's view of Nature undermined the sovereignty of the Christian God.

== Works ==
- Collegium experimentale, Nuremberg: Endter, vol. 1 (1676), available here and here; vol. 2 (1685) available here, here, and here.
- Physica electiva sive hypothetica, vol 1, Nuremberg: Endter, 1697, available here and here; vol.2, Altdorf: Kohles, 1698.

As well as the following:

- Mathesis Juvenilis
- Physica Modernae Compendium
- Praelectiones Academicae
- A list of works by Sturm with links to online versions is available at Astronomie in Nürnberg, section "Ausgewählte Werke".
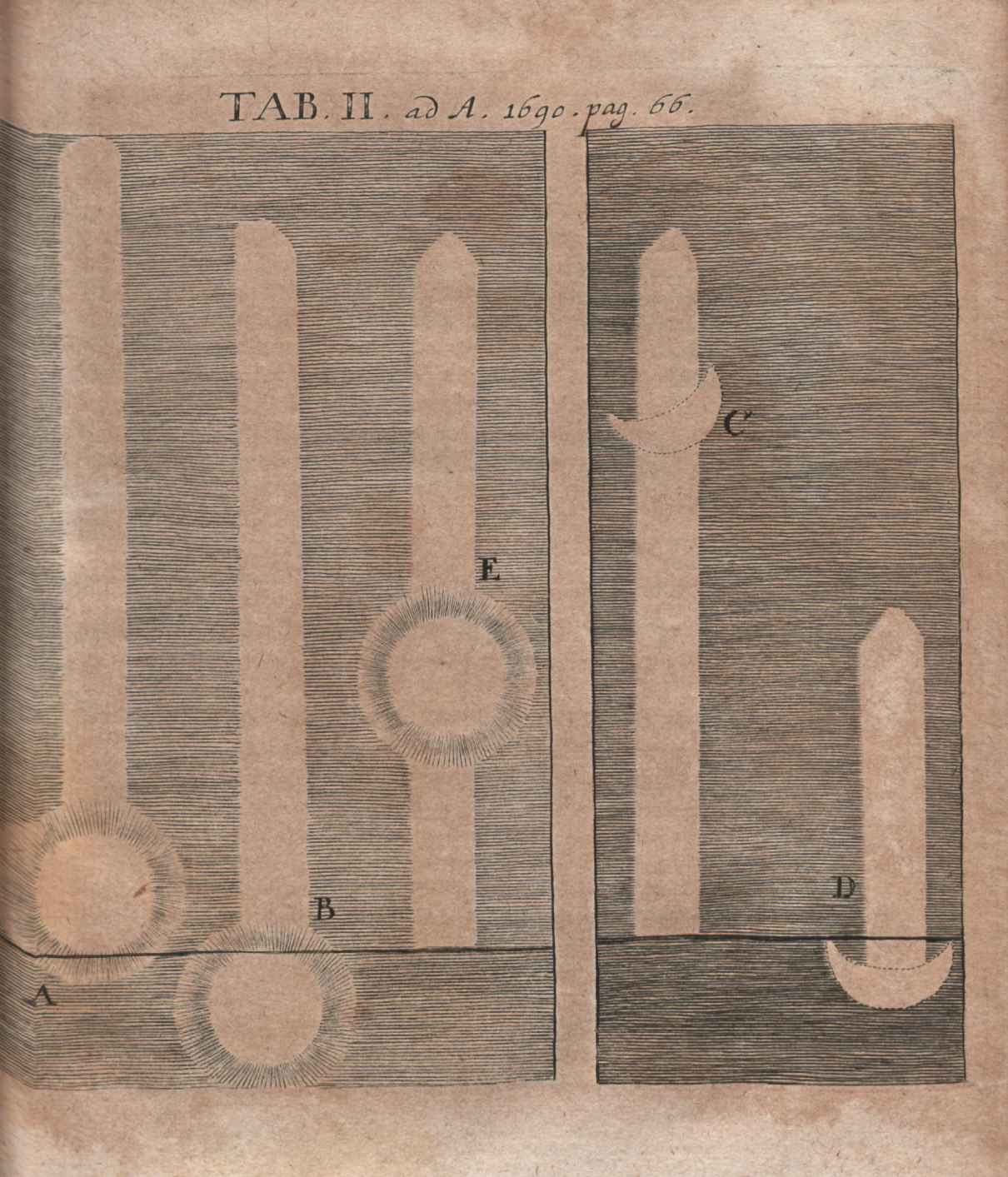
Illustratiom from Excerpta ex literis... published in Acta Eruditorum, 1690

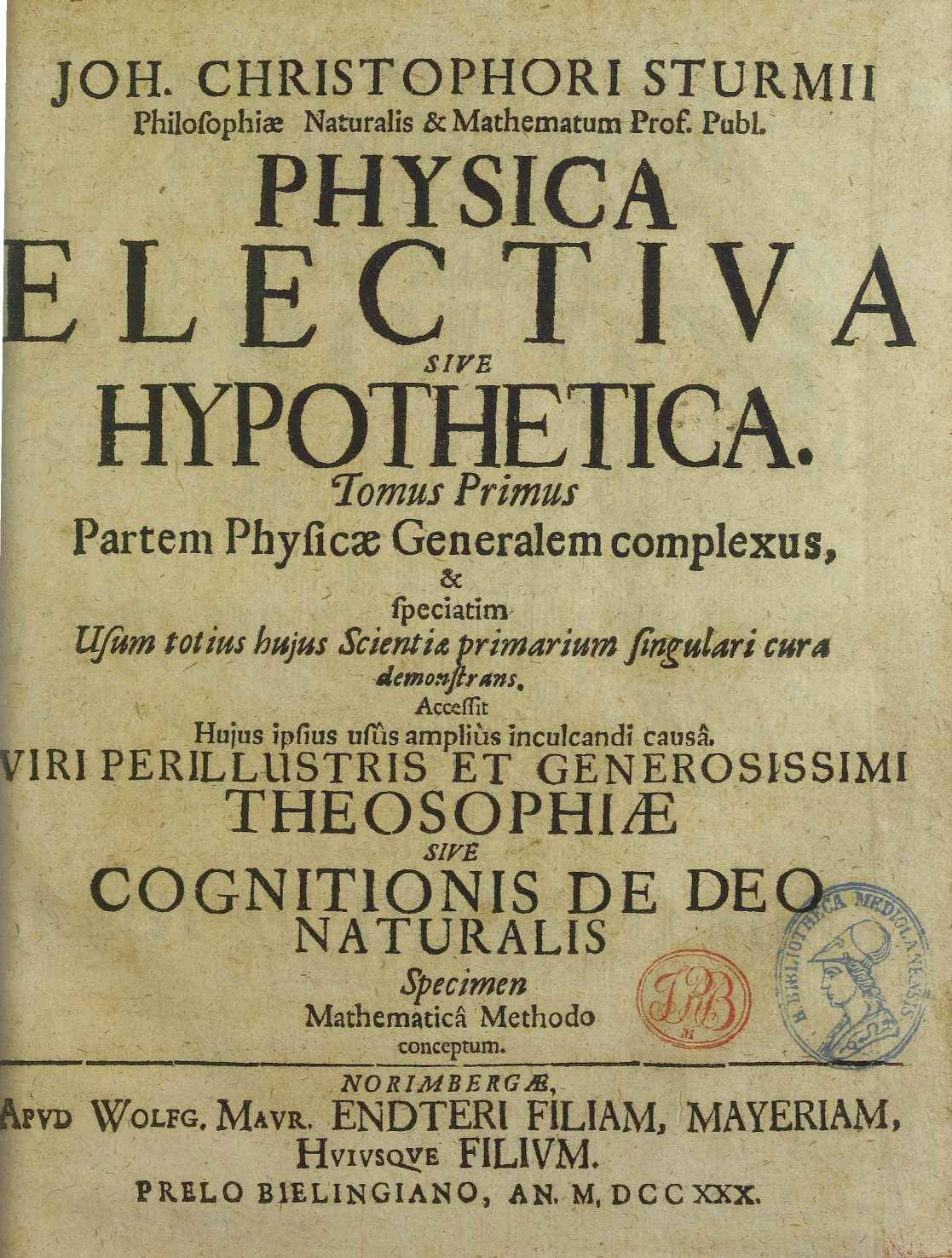
Physica electiva sive hypothetica
