= Karl von Eckartshausen =

German writer and archivist (1752–1803)

- Karl von Eckartshausen
- Born: 28 June 1752; Haimhausen, Electorate of Bavaria
- Died: 12 May 1803 (aged 50); Munich, Electorate of Bavaria
- Occupations: essayist, philosopher
- Writing career
- Subjects: Religion, mysticism, magic, alchemy

Karl von Eckartshausen (German: [ˈkaʁl fɔn ˈʔɛkaʁtsˌhaʊzn̩]; 28 June 1752 – 12 May 1803) was a German Catholic mystic, writer, and philosopher.

== Early life and education ==
Karl von Eckartshausen was born in Haimhausen, Bavaria. Eckartshausen studied philosophy and Bavarian civil law in Munich and Ingolstadt.

== Career ==
Von Eckartshausen was the author of The Cloud upon the Sanctuary, a work of Christian mysticism which was later taken up by occultists. It was translated into English by Isabelle de Steiger.

He joined the order of the Illuminati founded by Adam Weishaupt, but "withdrew his membership soon after discovering that this order only recognized enlightenment through human reason."

Von Eckartshausen was acquainted with Johann Georg Schröpfer, an early pioneer of phantasmagoria, and himself experimented with the use of magic lanterns to create "ghost projections" in front of an audience of four or five people. He died in Munich at the age of 50.

== Influence ==
The Cloud upon the Sanctuary was given a high status in the Hermetic Order of the Golden Dawn, particularly by Arthur Edward Waite. It is known to have attracted English author and the founder of Thelema, Aleister Crowley, to the Order.

== Publications ==
- — (1790). Aufschlüsse über Magie [Explanations Concerning Magic] (in German). Munich.
- — (1792). Aufschlüsse zur Magie aus geprüften Erfahrungen über verborgene philosophische Wissenschaften und verdeckte Geheimnisse der Natur [Insights into magic from verified experiences about hidden philosophical sciences and hidden secrets of nature] (in German). Munich. 4 vols.
- — (1796). Die wichtigsten Hieroglyphen fürs Menschen-Herz (in German). Leipzig.
- —. Die Wolke über dem Heiligtum [The Cloud upon the Sanctuary] (in German).
- — (1791). Gott ist die reinste Liebe [God is pure love] (in German). Munich.
- — (1989). Hanswille, Gerhard; Brumlich, Deborah (eds.). Magic: the principles of higher knowledge. Scarborough, Ontario: Merkur Publishing Company. ISBN 978-0-9693820-1-0. OCLC 24215790. Translation of Aufschlüsse zur Magie.
