= Aufschlüsse zur Magie =

1788 book by Karl von Eckartshausen

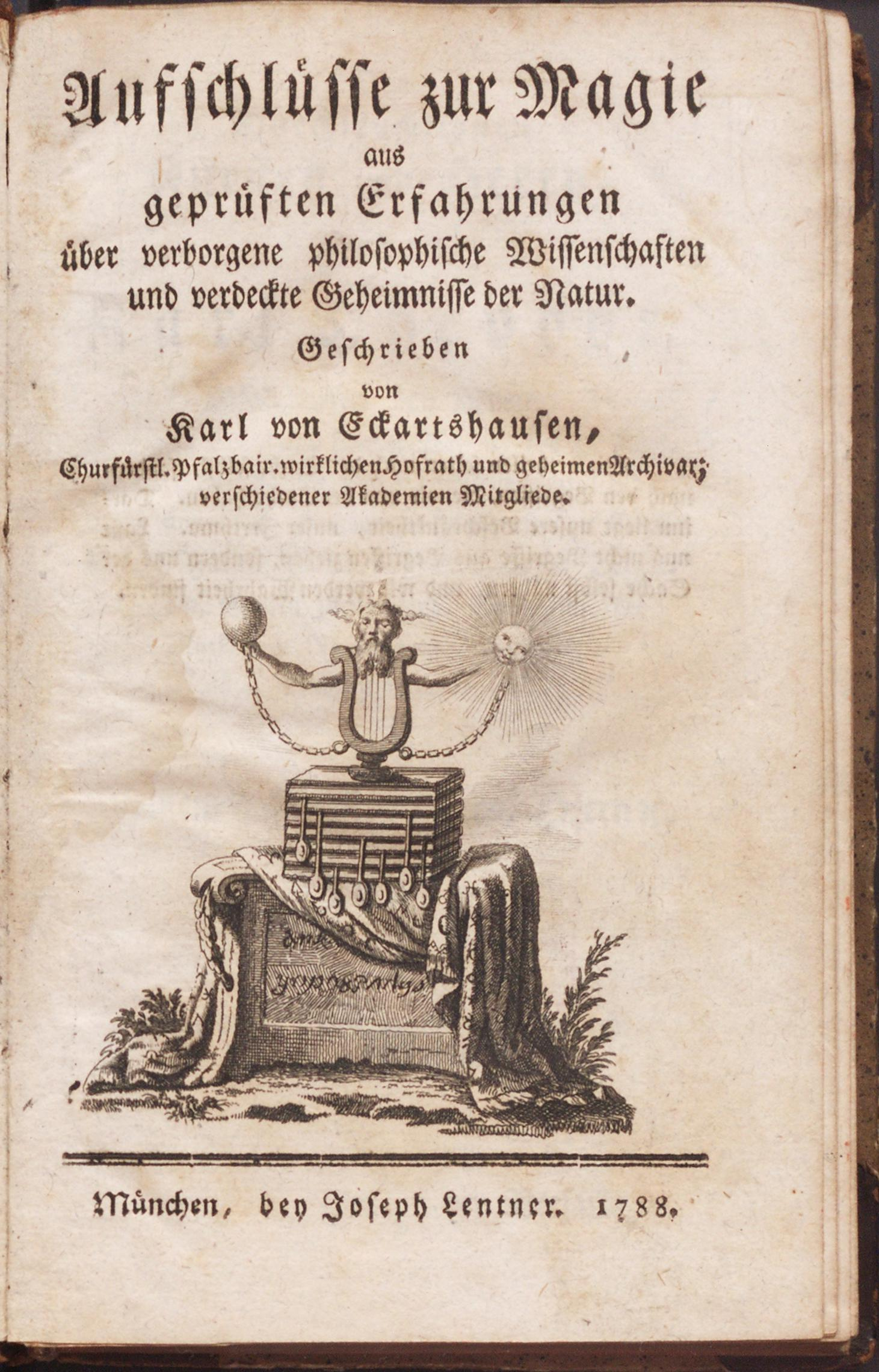
Title page of the book

Aufschlüsse zur Magie aus geprüften Erfahrungen über verborgene philosophische Wissenschaften und verdeckte Geheimnisse der Natur, Erstes Buch (English: Insights into magic from tested experiences about hidden philosophical sciences and hidden secrets of nature, book one) is a Christian theosophical work written by Karl von Eckartshausen and published in 1788 in Munich. It contains descriptions of diverse topics of natural philosophy and esotericism, drawing elements from Kabbalah and Hermeticism.

== Context ==
Von Eckartshausen was part of the enlightenment movement. However he did not hold the religion-critical beliefs usually associated with the movement. He rather viewed science, magic and religion as closely related, seeing the presence of a god in all scientific and philosophical knowledge. In 1780 he took on the role of secret archivist in Bavaria which likely granted him access to the knowledge he collected in Aufschlüsse zur Magie. After leaving the order of the Illuminati, which he was briefly a part of, he wrote multiple theosophical works describing his beliefs about the close relation between natural philosophy, magic and his god. He supposedly left the order, because it opposed his theosophical and romanticist ideals, instead seeking knowledge through rational means alone.

Aufschlüsse zur Magie is Eckarthausen's first written work of several that delves into the topics of theosophy and esotericism.

== Contents ==
Aufschlüsse zur Magie deals with ideas of the enlightenment movement and natural philosophy through a theosophical perspective. It conveys the idea that the secrets of nature will only reveal themselves to those who are good of heart. Such individuals may use the power that comes with such secret knowledge for the betterment of mankind. It also states that the closer one comes to the gods' creation, that is nature, the closer they get to the power of a god and that those who know the secrets of the gods' creation can use aspects of the gods' power that is imbued within.

The first part of the book describes a metaphysical order in the world including divine light as the origin and conduit of all creation. From this light lesser substances emerge through manifestation into bodies. Their described order is: light, magnetic flux, electricity, warmth, fire, air, water and earth. All of gods creation is then made from these substances manifesting into bodies in the corporeal world.

The last third of the book presents a theoretical framework of human sensory experience and the effect of the senses and the body upon the mind and soul. Eckartshausen describes nerve fibers as liquid filled canals that are able to vibrate. Harmonic vibrations are experienced as pleasant while dissonant vibrations cause pain. Vibrations can both be animated from the bodily state of a person or through sensory experience. Eckartshausen describes how imbalances of e.g. bodily fluids would cause the nerve vibrations to fall out of harmony. Additionally the sensory organs would also stimulate vibrations in the nerves through special warts. These sensory vibrations would then also cause pleasant or painful experiences affecting both body and mind.

All the concepts the book covers center on themes of harmonies and the concept of moving from dissonance to harmony with gods creation and finally to oneness with god. Eckartshausen describes many of the topics through analogous concepts, like for example reaching into another persons thoughts through electric harmony and changing human feelings and thoughts through sensory harmony.

== Reception ==
Eckartshausen continued Aufschlüsse zur Magie with three more volumes that were consequently published in 1790, 1791 and 1792. They continued to deal with philosophical and esoteric knowledge with the final volume promising to reveal the true secrets of magic.

Eckartshausen also published more theosophical works during the remaining 15 years of his life, the most influential of which was Die Wolke über dem Heiligtum or The Cloud upon the Sanctuary. It was translated into both French and Russian shortly after its release as well as into English towards the end of the 19th century. His works were read and discussed by many of his contemporaries including Johann Wolfgang von Goethe, Friedrich Schiller, Nikolai Gogol, and tsar Alexander I. Eckartshausen's esoteric works and specifically the English version of Cloud upon the sanctuary have remained prominent in esoteric circles, said to even have inspired Aleister Crowley during his time at the Hermetic Order of the Golden Dawn. Specifically, Eckartshausen descriptions of the inner church supposedly first made idea plausible for Crowley.

In Aufschlüsse zur Magie one topic of interest is Phantasmagoria. Eckartshausen's practical instructions on creating ghost lanterns are said to have helped popularize the practice. He also includes psychological and metaphysical explanations for ghostly apparitions. He opposes Immanuel Kant, who wrote on the topic a few years prior, in taking visual projections through optics as an analog for actual metaphysical spirit appearances. Kant on meanwhile judges optical and metaphysical explanations as mutually exclusive with either one or the other being true.

A shortened version of the first book of Aufschlüsse zur Magie was republished much later in Munich in 1923 together with the second book of the series. The added epilogue praises Eckartshausen as a brilliant mind ahead of his time and paving the way for the scientific exploits of the likes of Goethe with his early romanticist perspective on nature and religion.
