= The Ghost-Seer =

1787–1789 novel by Friedrich Schiller

- Author: Friedrich Schiller
- Language: German
- Publication date: 1787; 239 years ago to 1789; 237 years ago
- Publication place: Germany

The Ghost-Seer or The Apparitionist (full title: Der Geisterseher – Aus den Papieren des Grafen von O**; literally, The Ghost-Seer – From the papers of the Count of O**) is a novel by Friedrich Schiller. It first appeared in several instalments from 1787 to 1789 in the journal Thalia, later appearing as a three-volume book in its own right.

== Content ==
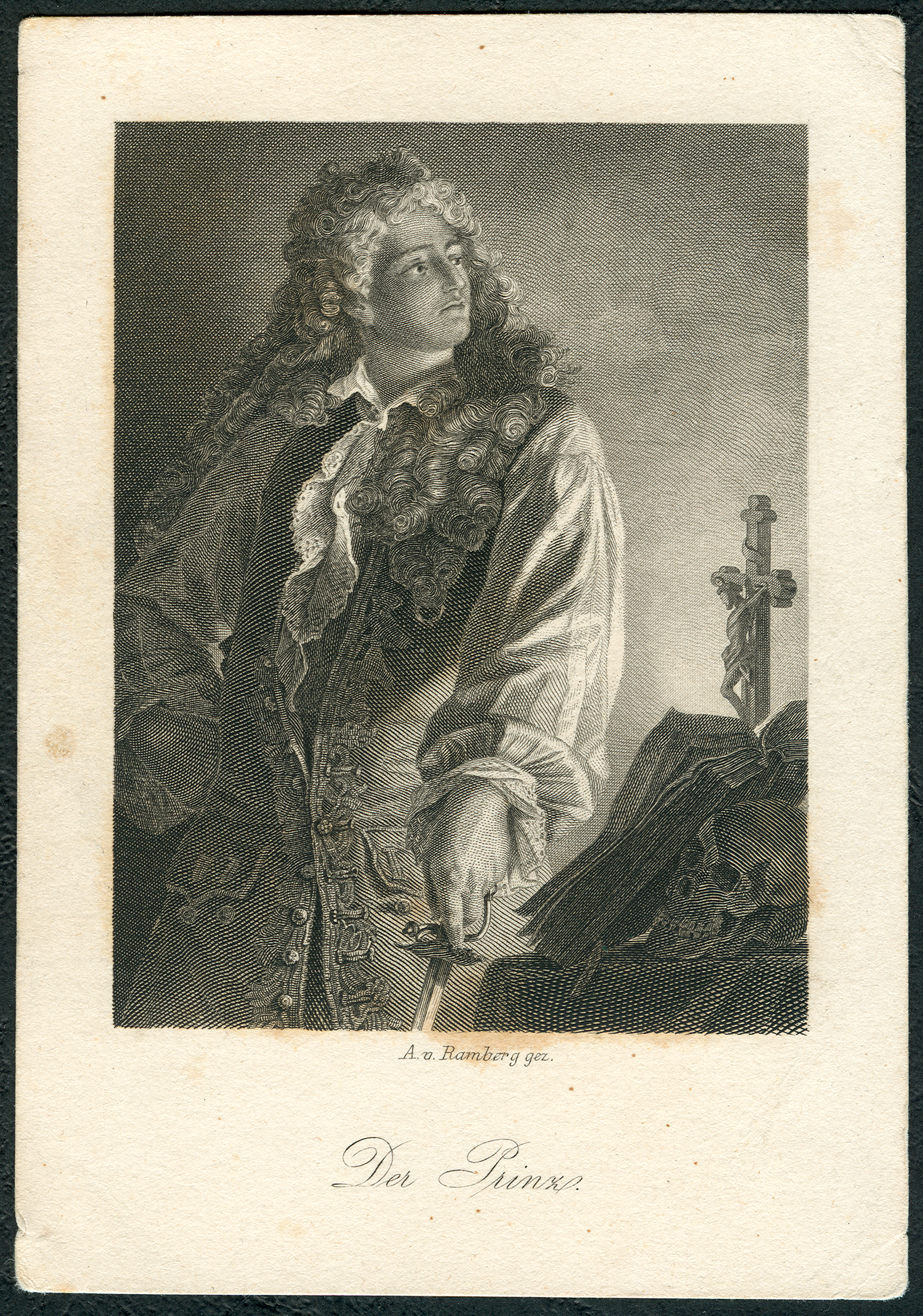
An 1859 engraving of the novel's protagonist.

The work is narrated in the first person by the 'Graf von O**' (Count of O**). It describes the story of a German prince visiting Venice at carnival time. Right at the start of the work, the Count stresses that this story might sound incredible, but that he had witnessed it with his own eyes. Furthermore, he talks of his disinterest in deceiving the public as "at the time these pages will tread into the world, I will not be and will neither win nor lose by the account given."

Structurally and stylistically it is not a single story, but tells of a Jesuit secret society trying to convert a Protestant German prince to Catholicism and bring him to the throne back home in order to bolster its own power base. Writing of the Prince's fate, Schiller shows him as the key to the conflict between passion and morality, passion and duty.

The work's passages on religious and historical philosophy show Schiller's Enlightenment ideals, with his critique of religion and society to the fore, though a deeper exploration of Immanuel Kant was to follow later. Due to the novel's slow formation and the author's antipathy to it, it was not planned from start to finish and its style and structure is not uniform throughout, ranging from rhetorical prose, to theatrical prose, to dialogues reminiscent of Don Carlos, to the popular elements of Gothic fiction.

== Legacy ==
Although the book remained unfinished, its audiences were the largest for any of Schiller's work during his lifetime. The readership was attracted by its elements typical of the Gothic novel, such as necromancy, spiritualism and conspiracies. It is thought that Johann Georg Schröpfer may have provided the inspiration for the novel.

The first English translation appeared in 1800 under the title "The Armenian". In 1922, The Ghost-Seer was completed by horror novelist Hanns Heinz Ewers. This version was not well received by literary critics.
