= Johann Georg Schröpfer =

German charlatan and necromancer (1730s–1774)

Johann Georg Schrepfer, or Johann Georg Schröpfer (1738? – 8 October 1774 in Leipzig), was a German charlatan, independent Freemason and necromancer. He performed ghost-raising séances for which he secretly used special effects, possibly including magic lantern projections of ghosts on smoke, which inspired the phantasmagoria shows popular in Europe from the 1790s to the 1830s.

Little is certain about Schrepfer's life. Many accounts stem from either adherent or opposing Freemasons and Schrepfer himself was an impostor who told many lies about himself.

== Biography ==
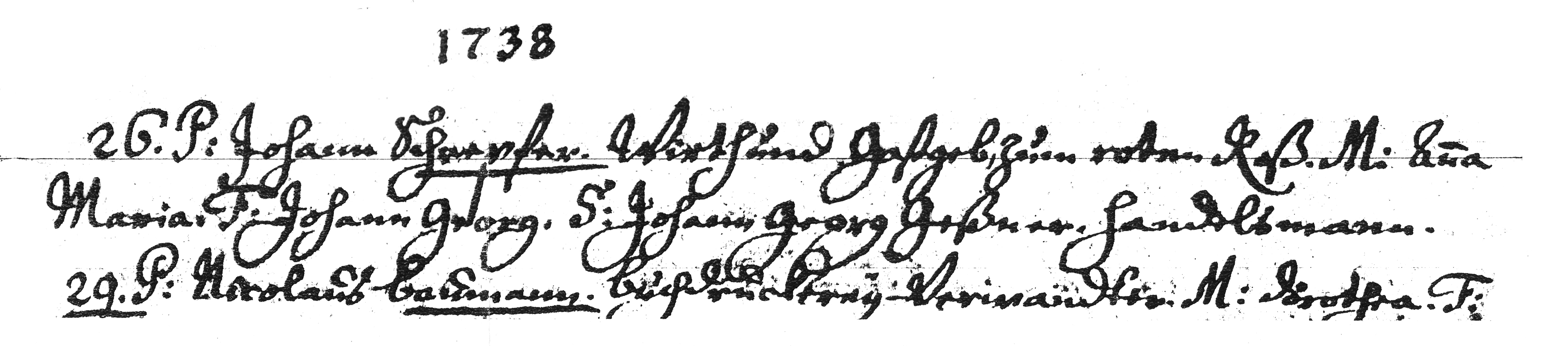
Schrepfer 26.3.1738 baptizing register entry St. Sebald

Schrepfer's year of birth is often stated to be 1730 and sometimes as 1739, but he was baptized in Nürnberg on March 26, 1738. He was listed as the eighth child of the host of "Zum Rothen Roße". Father Schrepfer later ran the "Goldenen Lamm" and seems to have gone bankrupt in 1753. Johann Georg reportedly served for some time as a hussar in the Prussian army at the start of the Seven Years' War. However, he also claimed to have been a cavalry commander with the imperial troops and to have received many wounds in battle (although his autopsy report clearly stated that no scars or signs of old injuries were found on his body). He came to Leipzig in 1759 and started as a "Küper" (controller of goods) in Hotel de Saxe. He became a citizen of the city in August 1761 and was registered as a waiter. September 20, 1761 he married Johanna Katharina Herr, the daughter of the quartermaster of the local tailors. She was already highly pregnant and soon gave birth to their first daughter. In 1769 they purchased the "Weisslederische Coffeé-Hauß" with Johanna's money. It was a café with a billiard room in the very center of town (at the corner of Klostergasse and the Barfußgäßchen, the location of restaurant "Zill's Tunnel" since 1841).

Saxony went through some hunger years in 1770–1771. Schrepfer had debts and his family seemed to live in relative poverty, but he reportedly maintained a frivolous lifestyle and often drank wine with his followers. It was thought he got some financial support from a French Masonic lodge or some Prince elsewhere in the country, often leaving Leipzig to visit them. He started his own Masonic lodge, probably to gain some power and to make money. He often promised people large sums of money and to make them happy. Among the many lies he told were claims that he was a Catholic priest and that he was the son of the French Prince von Conti.

Schrepfer always carried loaded pistols, which he claimed were to shoot himself with in case he fell into the power of evil spirits and could not go on.

Schrepfer was described as a big, subdued and handsome man, well educated, but with an inconsiderate and obtrusive behavior.

Two of Schrepfer's older brothers also lived in Leipzig. Georg Wolfgang Schrepfer became a respected wine merchant, banker and estate owner. Johann George Friedrich Schrepfer was a restaurateur of bloated and questioning aspect in Leipzig between 1770 and 1776. Johann Georg Schrepfer apparently did not get along with his brothers, but he wrote a farewell letter shortly before his death to Johann George Friedrich: "My beloved brother. Hurry to my wife and support her, or God will punish you. May all be well for you and yours. I love you till death."

== Masonic necromantic sessions ==
Schrepfer had most likely never experienced a Freemason lodge meeting when he started his own lodge of "true Masonry". Nonetheless, he claimed to be the sole person with knowledge of the real secrets of Masonry and to be able to communicate with the spirit world. He also claimed to be in touch with the true Masons in England. When asked about this, they wrote in reply: "Mr. Schrepfer is totally unknown in our grand Lodge, and indeed he has lately been represented to us from Berlin, as a very trifling ridiculous person, not worthy of any Notice or Countenance". He is thought to have gained most of his knowledge about Masonry from magazines, books and from listening to the many Freemason patrons he waited on, who spoke quite freely about their Freemason secrets, plans and activities. He reportedly stole some "magical" documents and Freemason scriptures of Duke Von Holstein-Gottorp during the Seven Years' War and learned more about magic from a merchant in Frankfurt am Main. This merchant would also have supported him financially and brought him into contact with Freemasons in Braunschweig. By the end of 1771 he had very good contacts with rich nobility and Catholic monasteries near the borders with Bohemia and Silesia. He performed "magical works" in Sorau (now Żary, Poland), before the Masons in Leipzig knew about him.

For a typical night of necromantic activity, Schrepfer's followers would fast for 24 hours and were served an Italian salad (possibly drugged) and much punch before the midnight start of séances in a darkened room with a black-draped altar. A robed Schrepfer performed the rituals and demanded his followers to remain seated at a table or face terrible dangers if they didn't. He made use of a mixture of Masonic, Catholic and Kabbalistic symbolism, including skulls, a chalk circle on the floor, holy water, incense and crucifixes. He started with a long prayer that addressed Jesus Christ, God and the Holy Trinity, asking for the protection of good spirits. He usually raised three different ghosts: one good soul in beautiful white, one neutral in subdued white and one evil in awful brown and black. The arrival of ghosts was mostly accompanied by a sound like that of wet fingers on glass, which sometimes grew louder and could continue for about an hour. The spirits he raised were said to be clearly visible with recognizable features, hovering in the air with their arms crossed in front of their chests. They seemed to be vaporous, not made of flesh, and at times they screamed terribly. Viewers agreed that these spirits were Gallic in origin as their shrieks were reminiscent of the ravings of those unfortunates suffering from the French disease. Ghosts could answer his questions and their voices sounded hollow. Apparitions reportedly raised by Schrepfer over the years included Frederick the Wise, August III, the beheaded Danish "traitors" Johann Friedrich Struensee and Enevold Brandt with their heads in their hands, Count Brühl, Maurice de Saxe and the Knights Templar's last Grand Master Jacques de Molay. During a séance in Dresden Schrepfer ordered a spirit to bring a letter to a companion in Frankfurt. The spirit obeyed and returned half an hour later with an answer signed in Frankfurt by the companion. Another spirit appeared engulfed in flames begging Schrepfer not to torture him so. Apart from raising ghosts, Schrepfer also demonstrated his powers by making a star shine much brighter at his command and by raising a storm in a forest.

Most spectators of Schrepfer's séances were convinced that the apparitions they saw were real. No clear evidence of deceit seems to ever have been found, but critics have described several suspicions. A local merchant who frequented Schrepfer's lodge claimed in his diary that he once barred the door behind them before the seance had started. Consequently, the expected ghost was heard fiddling with the lock, but failed to enter. Another time he hid under the table and recognized the shoes of a ghost as the shoes he had sold the day before to Schrepfer's oldest marqueur. Schrepfer had once rather suspiciously refused to raise the spirit of the famous poet Christian Fürchtegott Gellert who had been known in person by some of the spectators. Among the techniques that Schrepfer reportedly used for his elaborate effects were actors performing as ghosts, ventriloquism, hidden speaking tubes, glass harmonica sounds, aromatic smoke, camera obscura projections, magic lantern projections on smoke, concave mirror projections and staged thunder.

Schrepfer had been friends with pharmacist and Freemason Johann Heinrich Linck the Younger and regularly held lodge meetings in Linck's garden. Schrepfer even allowed Linck's wife into his lodge, while women were usually excluded from Freemason lodges. Linck was expelled from another lodge and probably told Schrepfer all he had learned there. Schrepfer needed materials that only a pharmacist could provide and Linck also knew a thing or two about optical and acoustic devices. A magic lantern and another type of projection box from his collection are now in the Museum Waldenburg. The projection box is decorated with a crucifix and a skull with wings.

== Conflicts with Masonic lodge Minerva ==
Schrepfer had several conflicts with the Leipzig Freemason lodge "Minerva zu den drey Palmen" of the Order of Strict Observance, whose members he tried to recruit for his own lodge. There are some indications that Schrepfer was connected to the secret Rosicrucian Order of the Golden and Rosy Cross, that wanted to infiltrate Freemason lodges to weaken them from within. Schrepfer claimed support of the Jesuits to hide this connection and to win people for his own lodge. After many dismissed attempts Minerva allowed Schrepfer to speak at a meeting on January 15, 1773. With much aplomb he declared himself the true Freemason of knowledge and power in front of the gathering. Minerva's leaders pleaded to show more respect for their lodge, as they had heard that he had accused them of being impostors. They reminded Schrepfer that Minerva had the protection of Prince Karl von Sachsen, former Duke of Kurland and said they would make a case of it if they heard more accusations, and then they let him go.

In the summer of 1783 Schrepfer reportedly entered a conference of the Minerva lodge and threatened them with pistols to give up their untruthful system.

Minerva sends a letter to ask Karl von Sachsen's help. Schrepfer in the meantime went for the support of Saxon court member and Commander of the Infantry Albert Christian Heinrich von Brühl, who was also connected to the Rosicrucian order. One evening during this period, some of Schrepfer's men, probably drunk, had plagued Minerva further by loudly and repeatedly calling out the lodge's main secret password beneath the windows of two of Minerva's men. Karl von Sachsen reply to Minerva's cry for help was placatory and the lodge started to fear for their future, hid their secret documents and tried to find some amicable agreement with Schrepfer. In the night of September 4, 1773, Schrepfer distributed 40 copies of a pamphlet stating that Minerva knew nothing of masonry and that people wouldn't get anything worth their money from their lodge. The flyer revealed the secrets of the first three degrees of Masonry and the high costs of membership. Schrepfer promised to reveal more secrets eight days later, but this never happened.

At this stage Karl von Sachsen was offended by Schrepfer's conduct and ordered his arrest and sent an officer to Leipzig to chastise the culprit on September 17, 1773. Several conflicting accounts of the incident exist. According to some, Schrepfer received a flogging of 100 strokes with a stick and had to sign a confession about receiving this punishment. This confession was published in local newspapers. Schrepfer reacted with a statement in the Frankfurther Zeitung denying the existence of his confession, as well as the punishment itself or any reason for punishment. He stated to have filed a complaint about his arrest, which had lasted 20 hours, with the Counsel of Leipzig. He concluded with a subtle dig at "a society that under the cover of Freemasonry, sought to restore the Order of the Temple". Another account of his punishment claims that Schrepfer ran into a corner, threw himself on his knees and called out for spirits to help him. This evocation, and the idea of ghosts actually appearing, scared the officer away. Following this shameful incident Schrepfer left Leipzig for a while.

== Séance at the Dresden court ==
Schrepfer appeared in Dresden under a false name, pretending to be a French colonel. He asked to be presented to the Elector Friedrich August III, but this was refused by François Barbé-Marbois, Chargé d'affaires of the French convoy. Schrepfer's real name was soon found out and reports of his supernatural powers reached Karl von Sachsen. The Prince decided to seek reconciliation and personally visited Schrepfer to apologize for the chastising he had ordered not long before. Schrepfer accepted the apologies and reluctantly promised to come and summon a spirit at the palace at the Prince's repeated requests.

The Prince chose the spirit of his uncle, Governor Johann Georg, Chevalier de Saxe to be evoked, partly in the hope that this would reveal where in the palace the Governor had hidden the large sums of money that he supposedly had amassed. At the appointed night a company of 19 witnesses had gathered in the great gallery of the palace. All windows and doors were secured, and Schrepfer offered punch to strengthen the nerves. Some readily accepted the drink, while others declined in order to keep a clear mind. Schrepfer started the ceremony, kneeling in a corner of the gallery. It took a long time before anything happened and Schrepfer worked himself into a violent sweat and almost in convulsions. Then a loud clatter was heard outside all of the windows and a sound followed which resembled a glass harmonica. According to Schrepfer this announced the arrival of good, protecting spirits. Not long after frightful yelling was heard, which Schrepfer attributed to the malignant spirits necessary for the commencement of the séance. He continued his evocations until a door opened with violence and a black orb rolled into the room, invested with smoke. Amidst the smoke a human face could be seen, resembling the Chevalier de Saxe. It called out loudly and angry; "Karl, was wolte du mit mich?" (Karl, what do you want of me, why do you disturb me?"). The spectators were all petrified and nobody dared to check its incorporeal nature. The Prince threw himself on his knees and called on God for mercy. Others asked Schrepfer to make the apparition disappear. It seemed to take an hour before Schrepfer's invocations dismissed the spirit, only to burst back in when the spectators had just started to feel relieved of the horror. Schrepfer's reiterated exorcisms at last expelled the apparition for good and left the spectators in awe of Schrepfer's supernatural powers.

The Elector soon heard about the event and forbade repetition. Prince Karl and Schrepfer kept on having séances in secret, with only one or two other Masons. Schrepfer returned to Leipzig but kept on visiting Dresden regularly.

== The big swindle ==
Schrepfer gathered more support from clergy and nobility and by spring 1774 he was in touch with minister Friedrich von Wurmb who became the shill in Schrepfer's biggest scam. Schrepfer convinced Wurmb that he had access to a sealed treasure of securities deposited in Frankfurt am Main, which included a French Royal patent and would ensure Saxony millions of income and would help it recover from a crisis. Speculators gave Schrepfer large advances, amounting to circa one million euro in today's money. On September 15, 1774, Wurmb had the packages of treasure opened in Leipzig in attendance of lawyer Johann Heinrich Hoffmann, merchant François DuBosc and son. Schrepfer was not present; he apparently had urgent business to do near the Prussian border. The packages contained nothing of worth: mainly worthless paper, tin capsules and boxes filled with sand and stones, underwear and socks. They apparently didn't dare to take Schrepfer to court as too much was at stake; even Karl von Sachsen had been more or less directly involved with the dubious speculation and the secret Rosicrucian network that some of them belonged to could become exposed.

== Death ==
According to several witnesses Schrepfer had a cheerful dinner with friends on the evening October 7, 1774, that lasted until 1:00 AM and involved much punch. Schrepfer and five of his associates – including lawyer Hoffmann and Karl von Sachsen's chamberlains Hans Rudolph von Bischoffswerder and Christian Friedrich von Hopfgarten – agreed to have a stroll to the Rosenthal forest on the edge of town at 5:00 in the morning, when it was still very dark. After he woke at 4:00 Schrepfer wrote several farewell letters of which a few transcripts are kept at the Leipzig city archives. The letter to DuBosc says (as translated from German): "My beloved friend. You and W. have made it happen that I'm now in the other life! The ones that I call shall follow me, hear my friend I will pray to God for you: but I advice you by your life, don't leave Bisschofswerter and help him. Before the coming new year's fair a strange hand will pay for me. May God make your ending as peaceful as mine! God will be the judge between us. I'm your friend until death. Two hours before my death. JGSchrepffer." He reportedly bid farewell to his youngest child and put his purse and gold watch in his wife's skirt. Schrepfer gave his companions the sealed farewell letters and asked them not to read these before they would have returned to the city.

One of the witnesses did declare that Schrepfer had wanted to tell them something on the way. According to legend, Schrepfer promised them an event like nothing they had ever seen before and probably would never witness again. Schrepfer disappeared from their sight for a moment, the sound of a gunshot was heard and Schröpfer was found dead. Some of the witnesses claimed he had magically disappeared or that only a necromantic ritual would be needed to resurrect him. Within half an hour after his death, Schrepfer's body was brought to the nearby hospital, where an autopsy was conducted. His remains were buried in silence on the hospital's burial ground for suicides on the same day.

The apparent suicide has later often been described as the result of Schrepfer's supposed delusions about his necromantic abilities, possibly partly due to the drugs he may have vaporized at his séances and which he must have repeatedly inhaled himself. He would have been perpetually tormented by evil spirits rendering his life miserable, or either he would have been convinced that he could resurrect himself after shooting himself to death.

There are several serious indications that Schrepfer was actually murdered or persuaded and helped to commit suicide. Important evidence for murder was found in the fact that the bullet went through the front of Schrepfer's mouth, as if the weapon was forced between his lips by another person and the victim resisted by pressing his jaws together. There were also some inexplicable conflicting aspects in the statements of the witnesses and there were many possible motives to why he would have been killed. It seems like the affair was covered up. Wurmb wrote a letter to Elector Friedrich August III, nephew of Karl von Sachsen, stating that juridical investigation was impossible without implicating the prince. No further investigation took place.

== Aftermath and legacy ==
Several of Schrepfer's associates – including Wurmb, DuBosc, Hoffman and Von Bischoffswerder – managed to become leaders of Rosicrucian circles a few years later and some of them were among the founders of the new Mason lodge Balduin in Leipzig in 1776. Von Bisschofswerder later had some influence on Friedrich Wilhelm II of Prussia through a Rosicrucian lodge and ghost-raising sessions. It has been suggested that he owned and used Schrepfer's optical apparatus to conjure up spirits.

Soon after Schröpfer's death there was a plethora of polemic publications either attacking or defendeding his supposed abilities to raise ghosts, including writings by Moses Mendelssohn, Christian August Crusius, Balthasar Bekker and Johann Christian Wiegleb. Schrepfer became quite famous across Europe; several publications included explanations of techniques he might have used to conjure apparitions, which inspired several people to recreate Schrepfer's séances.

In 1791 and 1792 phantasmagoria pioneer Paul Philidor advertised his shows under the title "Schröpferische Geister Erscheinungen" (Schröpferesque ghost appearances).

Friedrich Schiller's unfinished novel The Ghost-Seer, of which installments were published between 1787 and 1789, is believed to have been inspired by Schrepfer.

== Bibliography ==
Friedrich Kittler, Optical Media, Cambridge: Polity Press, 2010, pp. 98–101.
