= Étienne-Gaspard Robert =

Belgian stage magician (1763–1837)

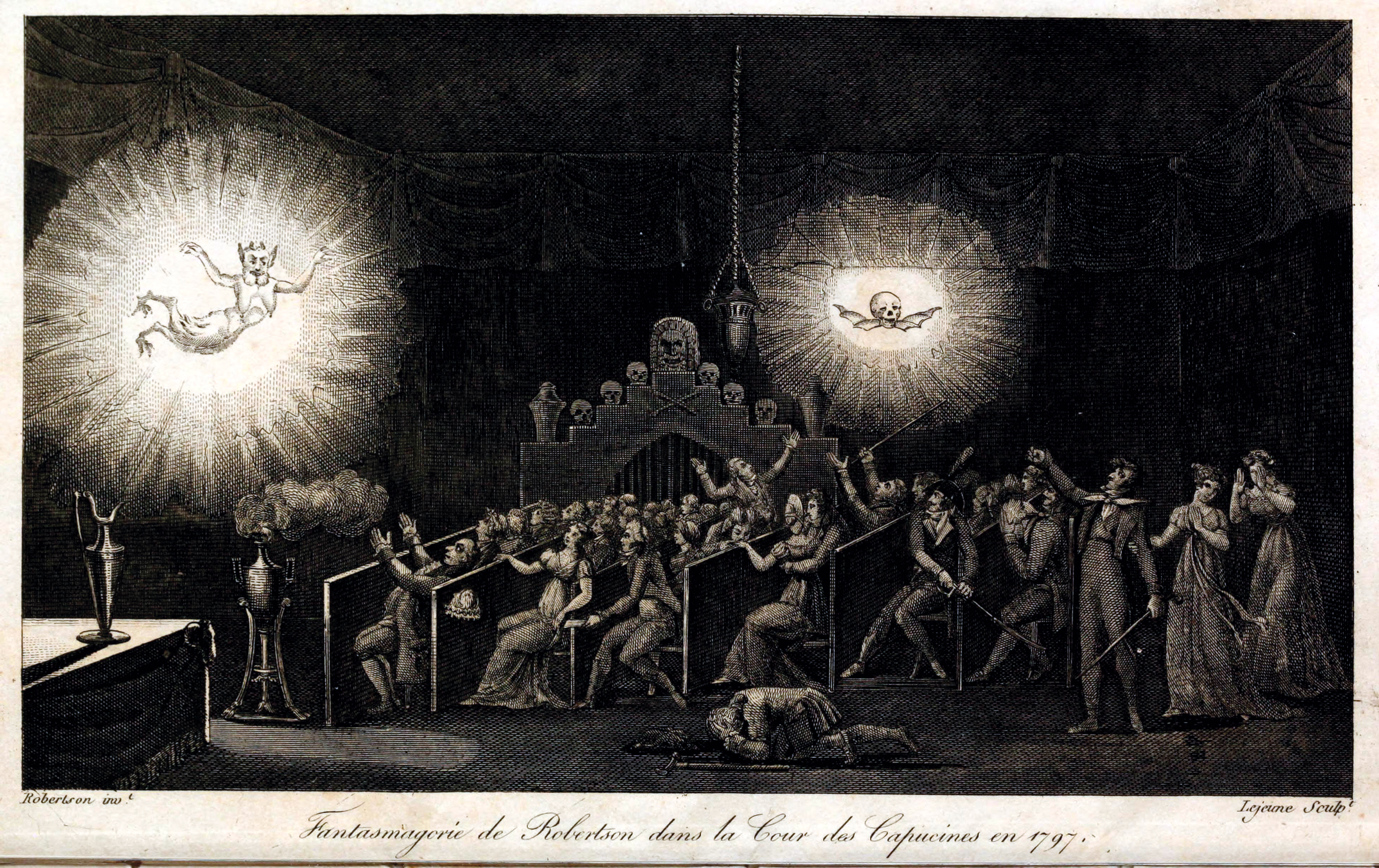
- Robertson's phantasmagoria, Paris, 1797
- Born: 15 June 1763; Liège, Prince-Bishopric of Liège
- Died: 2 July 1837 (aged 74); Batignolles, France
- Other name: Robertson
- Occupations: Stage magician, physicist and balloonist

Étienne-Gaspard Robert (15 June 1763 – 2 July 1837), often known by the stage name of "Robertson", was a prominent physicist, stage magician and influential developer of phantasmagoria from the Prince-Bishopric of Liège. He was described by Charles Dickens as "an honourable and well-educated showman". Alongside his pioneering work on projection techniques for his shows Robert was also a physics lecturer and a keen balloonist at a time of great development in aviation.

== Early work ==
Born in Liège, Prince-Bishopric of Liège, Robert studied at Leuven and became a professor of physics specialising in optics. He was an avid painter and intended to move to France to pursue a career in art. He moved to Paris in 1791 and maintained a living as a painter and draughtsman. While there he attended lectures in natural science at the Collège de France as well as those by Jacques Charles, a fellow scientist and important figure in ballooning history. Charles would go on to become a mentor for Robert.

In 1796, during the French Revolution and three years after the declaration of war between France and Great Britain, Robert met with the French government and proposed a method of burning ships of the British Royal Navy. Based on the myth of the mirrors of Archimedes, he wanted to employ enormous mirrors to direct intense amounts of sunlight onto the British vessels. The government turned down his suggestion.

Robert experimented with various areas of physics, giving public demonstrations about his research into galvanism and optics in the 1790s and early 19th century.

== Fantasmagorie ==
=== Inspiration from Philidor's show ===
Robert probably attended one of Paul Philidor's Phantasmagorie shows in Paris in 1792 or 1793. In 1790 in Vienna, Philidor had turned the fake séance ghost projections of charlatans into his pioneering phantasmagoria spectacle that allowed larger audiences to watch a safe but scary show. He probably profited from a strong light source, but especially revolutionized the concept of ghost-raising by claiming he used scientific and optical art to reveal how charlatans duped gullible audiences. After performing in Paris for about half a year, Philidor left and was not heard of again in France (although he took his show to other European cities).

With his understanding of optics, Robert would have had relatively little problem figuring out how Philidor's ghosts were created with the magic lantern. Years later, his further technological prowess was combined with his skills in painting and showmanship, in developing his own pre-cinema horror show. He evidently felt safe from any possible claims from Philidor and only slightly altered the spelling of the title that Philidor had introduced in Paris.

=== Fantoscope ===
Robert read the works of 17th-century scholar Athanasius Kircher and was particularly interested in the magic lantern. He created his own version of the device with several improvements, adding adjustable lenses and a moveable carriage system that would allow the operator to change the size of the projected image. He also made it possible to project several different images at once using more than one painted glass slider. The resultant display had a very ghostly effect, especially when in a smoky atmosphere. Through this the operator had the ability to manipulate images projected from an unseen location. In 1799, after further refining the system, he received a patent for his "magic lantern on wheels", naming it the Fantoscope.

=== Shows ===
I am only satisfied if my spectators, shivering and shuddering, raise their hands or cover their eyes out of fear of ghosts and devils dashing towards them

— Étienne-Gaspard Robert

Robert developed a phantasmagoria show based around his projection system and the use of other effects and techniques. Robert scripted scenes that involved actors and ventriloquism alongside his projections, creating a convincing impression of the appearance of ghosts. Robert used several projection devices in a variety of ways, including rear projection and projection onto large pieces of wax-coated gauze (giving the image a more translucent appearance). He also used smoke and mirrors to further disguise the mechanisms behind his show. His painting skills allowed him to create accurate depictions of famous French heroes such as Jean-Paul Marat, Voltaire, and Jean-Jacques Rousseau.

Robert appeared at the Pavillon de l'Echiquier on 23 January 1798 and performed his first show. His charisma and the never-before-seen visual effects left the audience convinced that they had seen real ghosts, with many left terrified by the performance.

After being investigated by the authorities, Robert's show was shut down in Paris. He moved to Bordeaux and continued to perform, before returning to Paris a few weeks later. It was during this trip to Bordeaux that Robert first experience balloon flight as a passenger – an experience that would have a massive influence on his life. On his return to Paris Robert discovered that two of his former assistants had continued the performances without him. He refined his show, making it more elaborate and inventive and started performing in a more permanent location from 3 January 1799. The Gothic surroundings of the crumbling Convent des Capucines near the Place Vendôme gave Robert the ideal eerie home for his show.

The shows began with the audience being shown optical illusions and trompe-l'œil effects on their way to the showroom. Inside the candlelit room the audience would be seated as audio effects emulate the sound of wind and thunder and an unseen glass harmonica plays unsettling music. Robert would then enter the room and start a monologue about death and the afterlife. He then began the show in earnest, creating smoky mix of sulphuric acid and aqua fortis before projecting his ghostly apparitions.

The shows were performed at the Convent des Capucines for four years, and Robert went on to take the show around the world, visiting Russia, Spain, and the United States among others. During his travels he dedicated a lot of his time to ballooning.

== Balloon flights ==
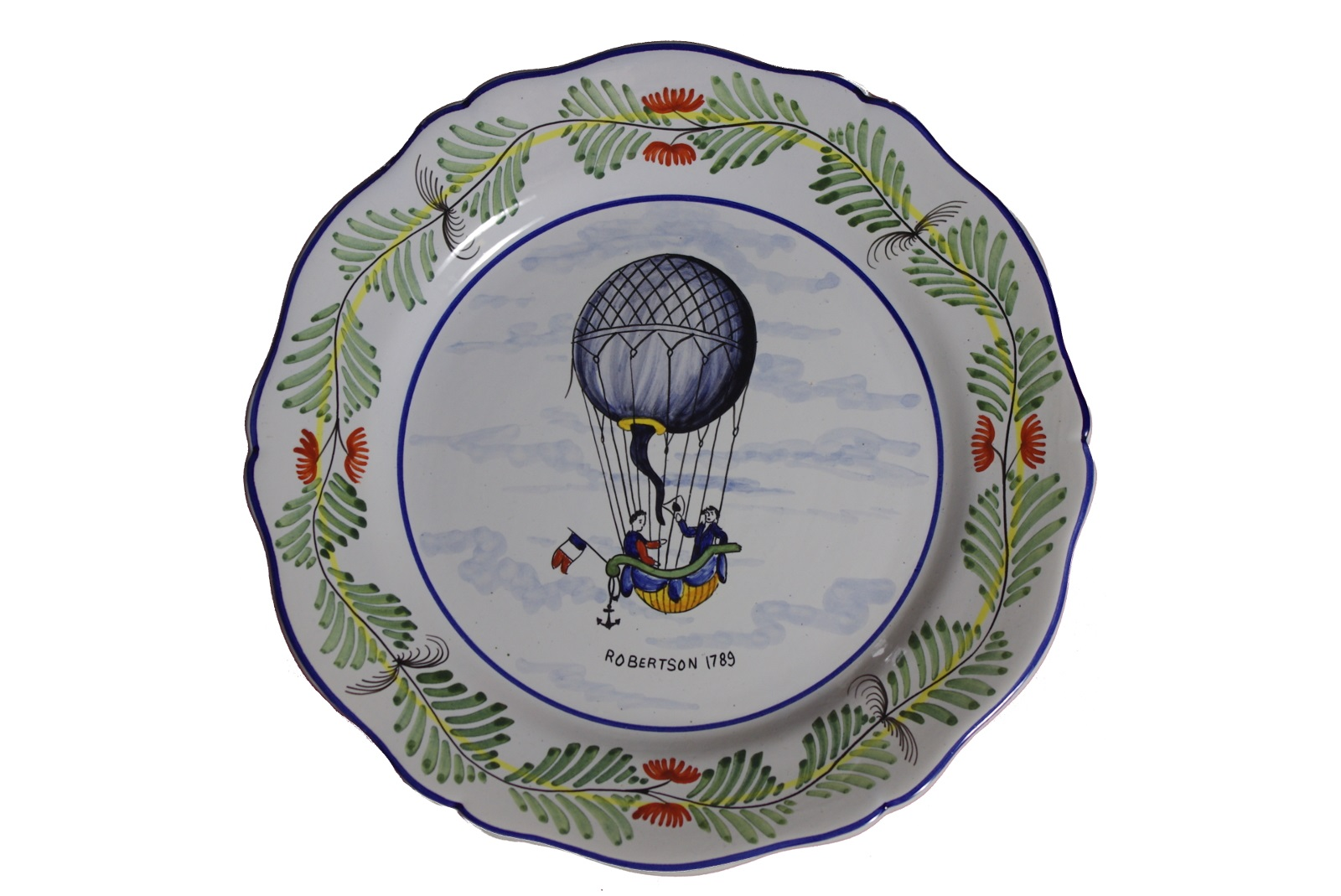
Commemorative 18th century plate

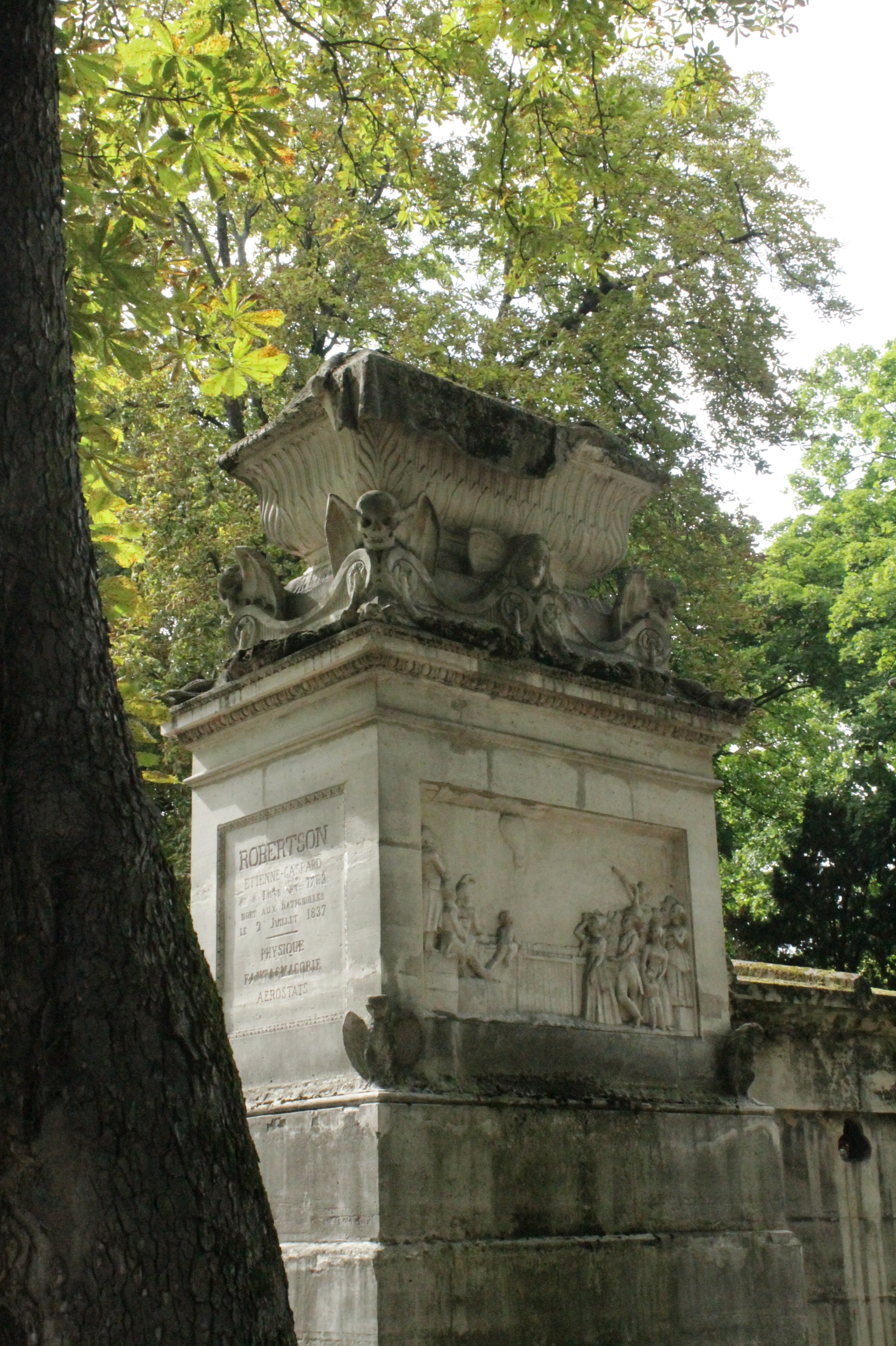
The grave of Etienne Robertson, Pere Lachaise Cemetery, Paris

Robert was a keen balloonist who designed and flew balloons in different countries around the world. On 18 July 1803 in Hamburg, he set an altitude record in a montgolfière. He spent many flights investigating meteorological activity.

Robert's two hydrogen-balloon flights in Hamburg, a third in St. Petersburg and a fourth in Riga were claimed to be "scientific" by himself. In fact, he did numerous observations: Observations of barometer and thermometer, on shapes and altitudes of cloud formations, the behaviour of parachutes at different altitudes, the evaporation of ether, the electrical properties of different materials and the air, behavior of a magnetic needle, the boiling point of water at great altitudes, sound propagation, influence of the high altitudes on animals (pigeons and butterflies), strength of solar radiation, the solar spectrum, gravity properties, chemical composition of the air and pressure of the air.

Nevertheless, close examination of the results shows, that many of them contradict with laws of physics, which were already known at the time of the flights. Prof. L.W. Gilbert discussed the results published by Robert in his Annalen der Physik. and showed why Robert was wrong. For example, Robert claimed, that a spring scale with attached weights showed a lower weight at altitude as compared to the ground. Such an effect exists, but only becomes apparent at altitudes in excess of 70,000 feet (20,000 metres).

In 1806 an audience of 50,000, including the royal family, gathered at Rosenborg Castle in Copenhagen to see Robert and his balloon. Robert flew all the way to Roskilde – a remarkable feat for the time. The event made a lasting impression on Hans Christian Ørsted, an influential Danish physicist who went on to write a series of poems about the flight.

== Other details ==
Robert officially opened the third Jardin de Tivoli, Paris on 14 May 1826.

He died in Paris in 1837 and is buried at Père Lachaise Cemetery. The huge monument bears bas relief sculptures depicting audiences being startled by ghoulish shows.

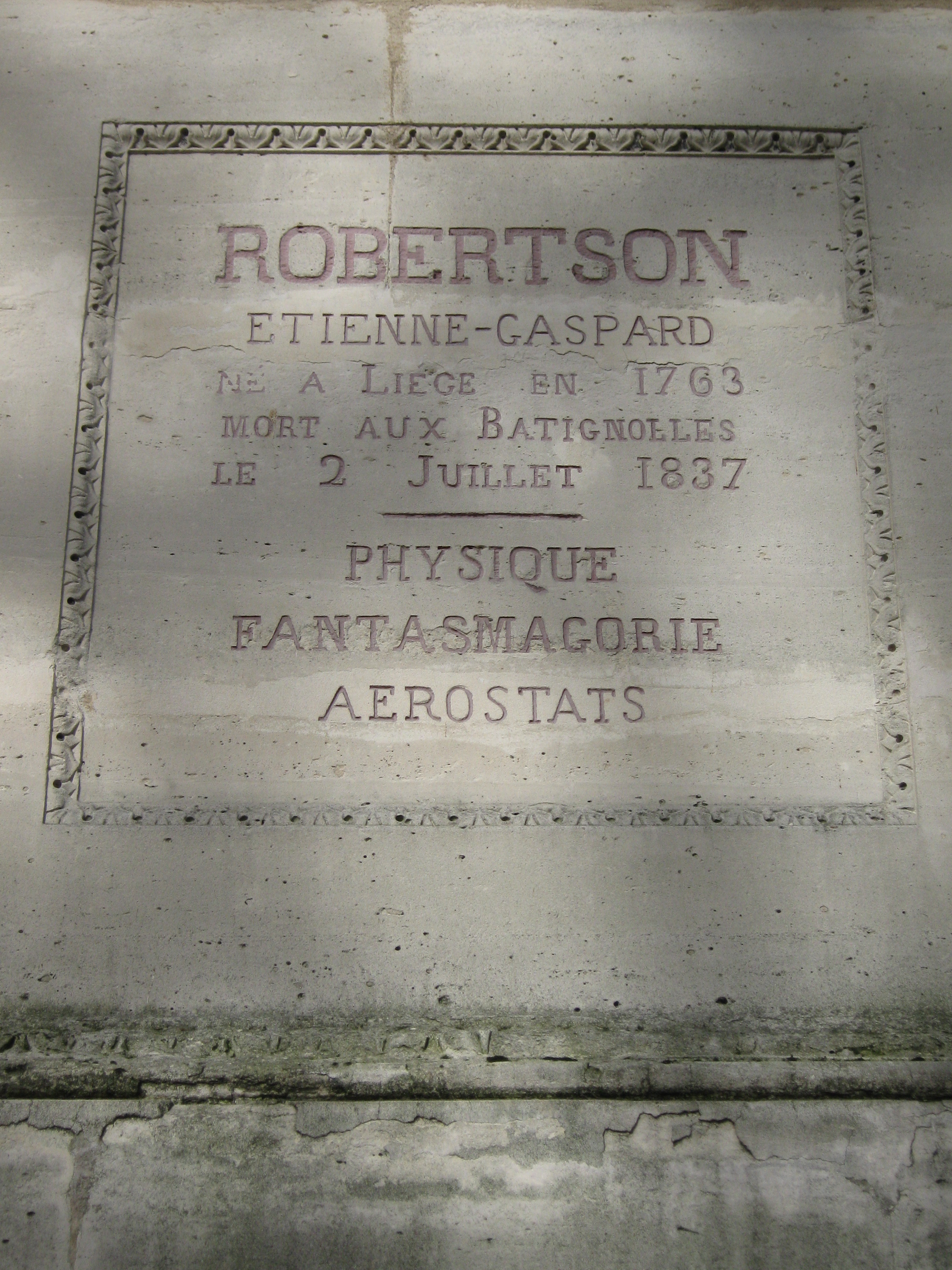
Robertson Gravesite, Paris, France

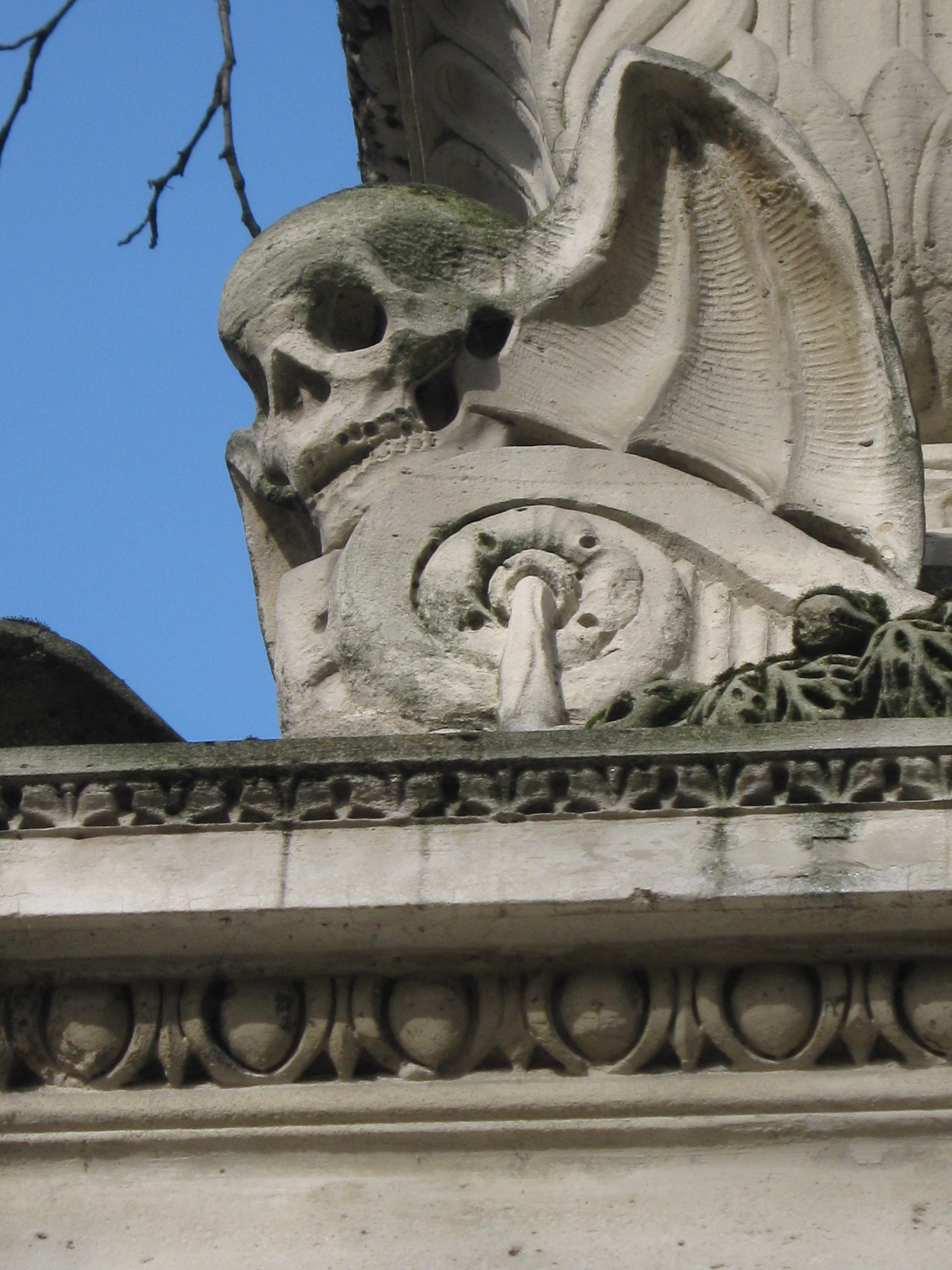
Detail of Robertson gravesite

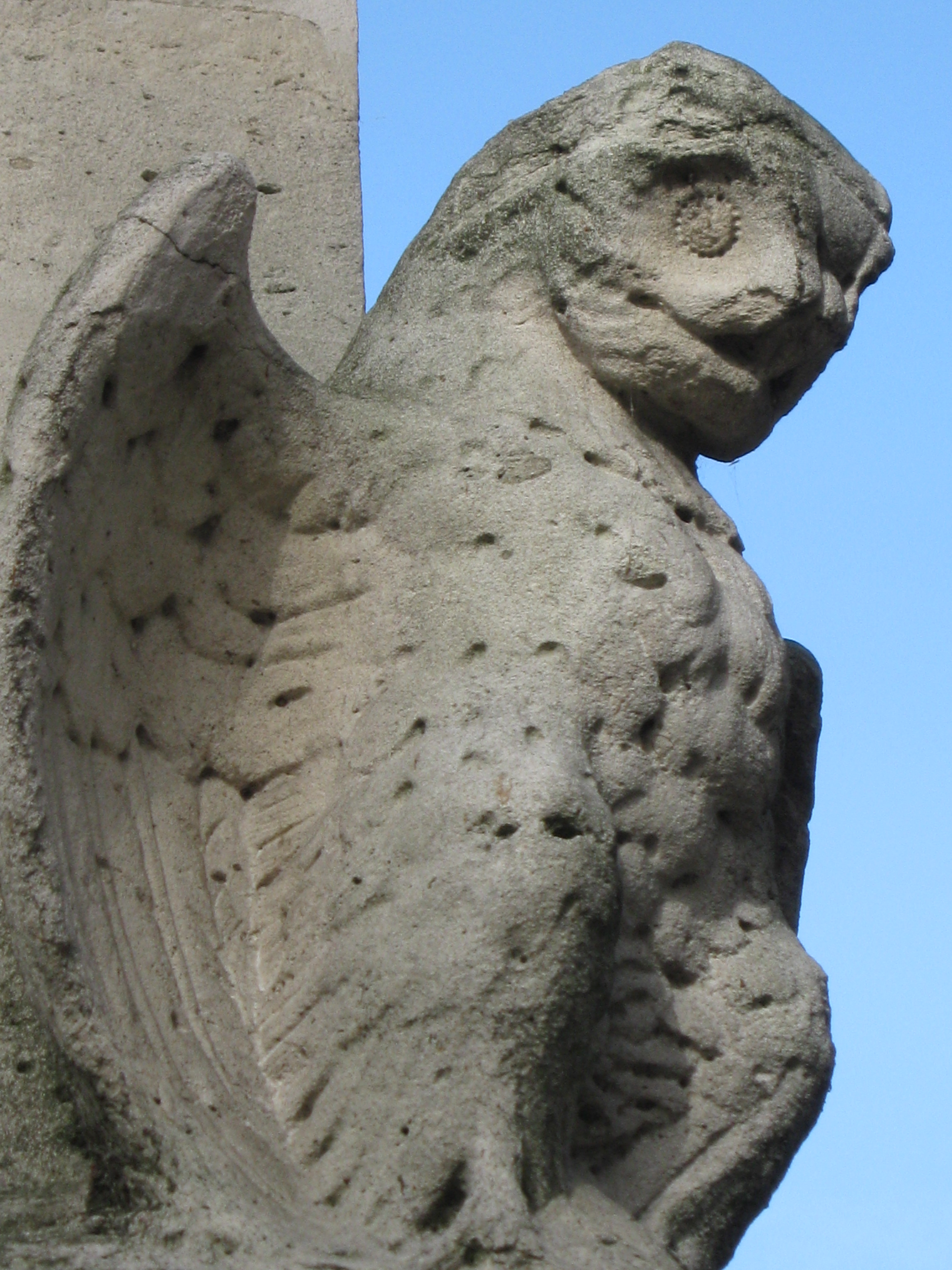
Detail of Robertson gravesite

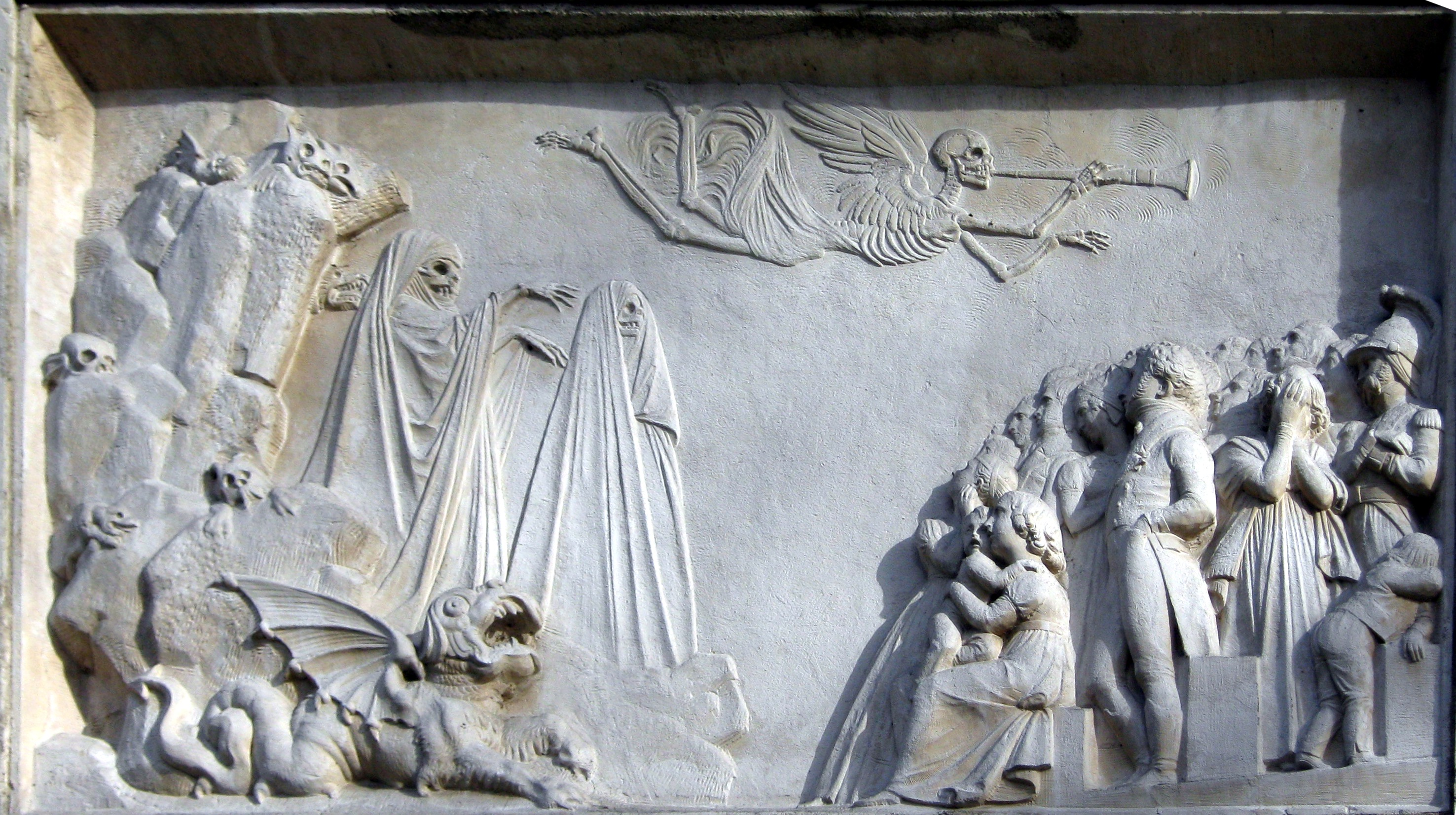
Detail of Robertson gravesite

Preceded by Children of Llullaillaco	Human altitude record 1803–1838; With: Auguste Lhoëst	Succeeded by Charles Green and George Rush
