= Paul Philidor =

Magician and showman

"Phylidor"
- Died: 1829
- Other names: Paul de Philipsthal, Paul Filidort, Charles Phyllidoor
- Occupation: Stage magician
- Years active: 1785–1828
- Known for: Phantasmagoria

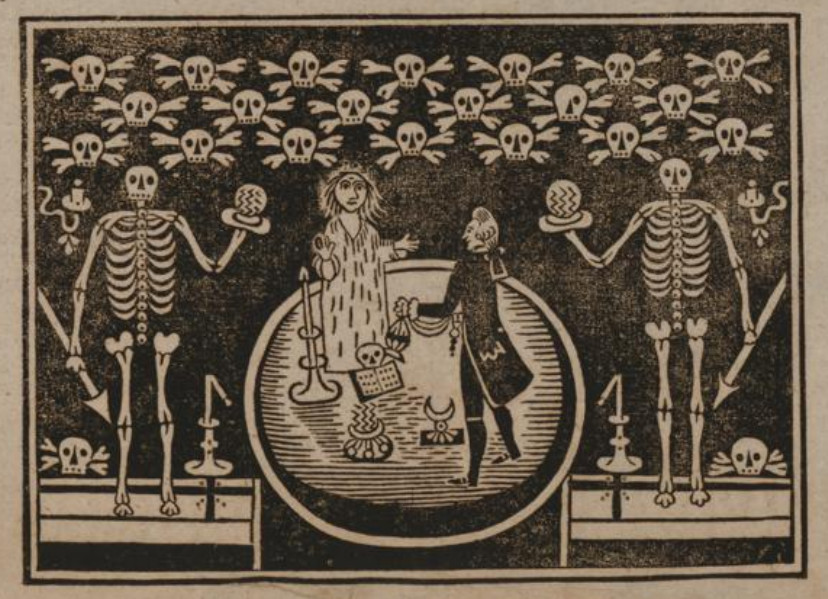
An illustration of a performance by Phylidor, from a 1791 handbill.

Phylidor (died 7 March 1829), also spelled "Phylidoor" or "Philidor", also known as "Paul Filidort" and probably the same as Paul de Philipsthal, was a magician and a pioneer of phantasmagoria shows.

== Biography ==
Phylidor's origins are unclear, as is his exact identity. It is believed that he took his name from François-André Danican Philidor and he was even thought to be the nephew of this French composer and chess master of the famous Philidor family.

Phylidor reportedly was from the Duchy of Brabant, now parts of Belgium and The Netherlands. He was also claimed to be from the neighboring County of Flanders. Phylidor reportedly spoke French when he was in Berlin. He was thought to be German when he came to Paris in 1792.

From 1785 to 1800 Phylidor traveled through Europe as a showman. He also at least occasionally traded in "physical instruments", and taught some of his tricks to paying customers.

By the time Phylidor came to Berlin in 1789 he was married and had a servant. He probably was a rich man, at least in the early 1790s: wealthy enough to own a carriage and to bribe a high official, but he may have lost his fortune later on.

In handbills, newspaper advertisements and announcements, Phylidor sometimes claimed the praise of the royalty of several European courts. In 1786, he claimed to have a privilege of the Menus-Plaisirs of the King of France. From Catherine the Great and her court members he reportedly received 1.000 rubels, a gold tobacco box and a brilliant ring as appreciation for his performance of physics experiments in January 1787. He claimed to have gotten praise of the Dresden court for his new show in 1789. At least once he claimed to be of nobility, when he was registered in Regensburg in 1792 as "Herr Baron von Phylidor, Physicus von Wien".

Although perceived as a charlatan and a very mediocre magician by enlightened Berliners in 1789, in the eyes of others he gained the reputation of an extraordinary man with special powers. He reportedly helped a lady who came to him for advice about the theft of clothes from her house: Phylidor said he would make the thief very unhappy for the rest of his life, if the clothes were not returned the next day. On Phylidor's request she told this to all her servants and the next morning the clothes were back in place. Phylidor also made a barber believe that he had removed his own head to shave himself, by posing with a fake head made out of wax.

From around December 1798 to 1800, Phylidor collaborated on his shows with a business partner, who was also advertised to be a physicist.

In March 1799, Phylidor had a feud with Dutch glassblower J. Demmenie, who according to Phylidor had copied his show after Phylidor had used a tent of Demmenie's mother and had worked with his brother in law as an attendant. Phylidor took out an ad in two local newspapers to warn the public against this poor copy of his show. Demmenie replied in the newspapers by calling Phylidor an alien libeller and claiming that the used machinery had been known to physicists for a hundred years, and shown by others in the region for the past six years.

== Paul de Philipsthal ==
Phylidor was very likely the same person as Paul de Philipsthal who lived in the U.K. and first performed Phantasmagoria shows in October 1801.

Philipsthal was granted a British patent for his Phantasmagoria on 27 January 1802.

Paul de Philipsthal and his wife Mary had a son called Albert Augustus and a daughter called Paulina Theresa, both baptized in St Luke's Church, Chelsea on 13 August 1819.

Paul de Philipsthal died unexpectedly on 7 March 1829 in Leeds, after a short illness that started the evening before. He had been performing in Leeds for six weeks, but his shows weren't very well attended and he had arranged to perform in Wakefield a few days later. He reportedly left his widow and three children unprovided for, so an appeal was made in the local newspaper to collect funds that would enable the family to move to Hull and get Mrs. Philipsthal established at a school over there. A benefit exhibition for the widow and children of Philipsthal's "Royal Mechanical & Optical Museum" was shown in the Wakefield Theatre.

== Influences ==
Much of Phylidor's early shows and stage persona was based on the works of famous magician Joseph Pinetti. Pinetti had performed magic shows and exhibited ingenious mechanical devices across Europe, including performances at the Menus-Plaisirs for the King of France in 1783. Pinetti publicized his shows cleverly. He claimed to be a professor of Mathematics and Natural Philosophy and dressed in courtly attire. Phylidor usually presented himself as a physicist in his advertisements. Many of the secrets of Pinetti's tricks had been revealed in publications by Henri Descremps, starting in 1784 with the novel La magie blanche dévoilée when Pinetti was still performing in Paris.

Phylidor referenced Johann Georg Schröpfer and Cagliostro in several advertisements. In the early 1770s Johann Georg Schröpfer had performed Masonic necromantic rituals and experiments, raising ghosts that were probably created with many hidden techniques including magic lantern projections on smoke. Soon after Schröpfer's death there was a boom of publications either attacking or defending his supposed supernatural abilities, expanding Schröpfer's fame across Europe. Several publications included explanations of techniques he might have used to conjure apparitions, which inspired several people to try to recreate Schrepfer's séances. Cagliostro was thought to have performed similar séances.

== Performances ==
Early shows by Phylidor were advertised as "black art" or "natural magic" and included conjuring tricks and automata. When these weren't received well in Berlin in 1789, he hoped to make a better impression with the evocation of ghosts. Phylidor's first séance resulted in the accusation of being a fraud. He was ordered to stop his activities and was expelled from Berlin.

A few months later he published a statement that he never had conjured up any spirits, but that he showed how people could be deceived by charlatans. He regarded his shows by no means as supernatural, but as an art which had already found praise at the Dresden court. He further developed his ghost-raising show, probably making use of the recently invented Argand lamp, into a show that could more easily be seen by large audiences.

Over the years his performances were advertised to include magic, pyrotechnics, physics experiments, hydraulics, hydrostatics magnetic-mechanical experiments, mechanical pieces of art (including life-size mechanical figures), optical illusions / optical art (including apparitions of ghosts and absent persons) and catoptrics.

=== Dutch Republic (December 1785 to March 1786) ===
Phylidor's first known performances were advertised by "Charles Phyllidoor, professor in de physique en Mathematique" to take place at six in the evenings of 27, 29, and 31 December 1785 and 2 January 1786 at De Schuttershof in Middelburg. He promised different tricks for each evening and presented his show as "Zwarte Konst" (Black Art) in one of his newspaper advertisements.

A few months later "De heer Phylidoor, professor in de Physique en Mathemathique" arrived in Groningen and advertised two "Representations der Zwarte Konst" to take place in the local Concert Zaal at six in the evenings of 22 and 23 March. "Moved by the lively appreciation and polite manner of several distinguished gentlemen who engaged him" he would be back on 28 and 30 March for other "amusing experiments", including a trick which involved shooting away a ring that would be returned by Phyllidoor's dove and made to be found inside an orange. Spectators were requested to bring oranges for this purpose.

In April, he proposed to perform two more wondrous experiments, the first consisting of fireworks of inflammable air in which several animals could be seen. On command of the audience he would make the flames change into 25 different colors. For the second presentation Phylidoor would render a person of the audience unable to move, for as long as pleased him. Subscription to the performances was one Ducat, which was perceived as rather expensive.

=== Berlin (8 February to 30 March 1789) ===
==== Magic shows ====
Arriving from Russia, Phylidor first performed in Berlin on 8 February. The flyer promised "sehenswürdige Magische oder sogenannte Schwarzkunst nachahmende Kunststücke" (great magic tricks that imitate the so-called "black arts"). It would, among other surprises, include the following highlights:

- Theophrastus Paracelsus; a golden head that made lifelike movement and could answer all questions with certain signs
- a magic crystal column, circa 2 feet high, from which certain things would jump up on command of the audience
- der Großsultan; an Ottoman figure that on Phylidor's command would curtsy to the audience and answer questions by movements of his head, understanding questions in German as well as in French
- a Dutch windmill, with a new sympathetic invention causing its sails to stop and turn according to one's wishes
- a clock on a crystal column, which would tell whatever time desired by the audience, without anyone touching it
- from a distance and without touching it, Phylidor would take the life of a bird that was being held by someone in the audience and then resurrect it
- a magnetic staff would make a round object move around and on command of the audience dance a waltz in the air

When his "Expériences physiques de St. Philidor" or "magical experiments" of the following weeks were perceived as mediocre magic tricks and raised little applause, Phylidor decided to try something else.

==== First failed necromantic session ====
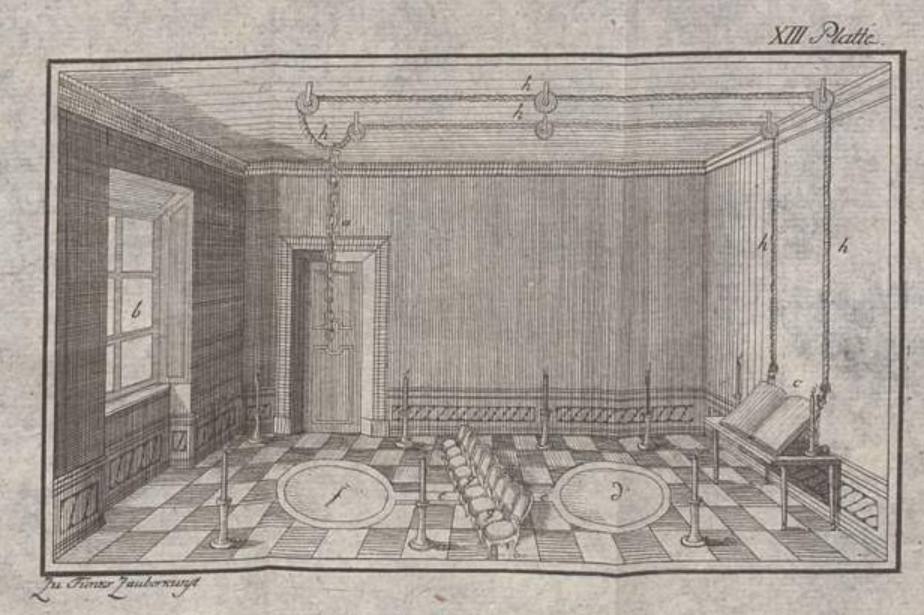
The room used by Phylidor reminded Von der Reck of this illustration in Christlieb Benedict Funk's Natürliche Magie (1783)

After twelve days of preparation, Phylidor invited an audience of 14 men to an evocation of ghosts at 7:00 p.m. on 30 March. The 14 distinguished men did not expect to see real ghosts, but intended to amuse themselves by trying to find out how this magician intended to fool his audience. They agreed to keep their heads clear to witness the evocation as attentively as possible. Royal Theater director Von der Reck was among the 14 men who were welcomed by Phylidor's wife and a little man that she called "Professor", before they were led through small and dark staircases up to the third floor where Phylidor awaited them.

Phylidor was dressed in black and led the visitors into a small darkened room with dazzling white walls, in which a rectangular area was fenced off with a construction of slats with a metal hand on each end. In the center of a chalk circle on the floor were a wand and a small lantern on a folded long black cloth. A container with almost burned out coals stood next to it. Phylidor asked the spectators not to speak, move or touch anything since they were surrounded by terrible dangers.

He advised them to hold each other's hands, and the ones on the end to hold the metal hands in order not to fall over and as a protection against the dangers. Von der Reck asked the man next to him to let go of his hand, because he suspected the metal hands could be used to give them an electric shock. Phylidor then extinguished the lantern, leaving only the very weak light of the coals. Soon thick white odorous smoke started to spread across the room and Phylidor started the ritual.

It included some incantations in a dull but commanding voice with the words "Helion, Melion, Tetragrammaton", as reportedly used by Cagliostro, some French sentences like "Parois. Esprit terrible! Esprit terrible, épargne moi!" and the name of Jehovah mixed in repeatedly. A terrible thunder-like noise filled the room and as Phylidor called out: "Esprit, parois!" (Ghost, appear!), a streak of light appeared on the wall that gradually transformed into the almost life-size figure of Voltaire, dressed in white and hovering a foot above the floor. Some spectators complained that this was a very poor apparition and clearly a projection of some transparent picture.

Phylidor commanded the spirit to disappear and soon an apparition of Frederick the Great followed. When some visitors complained that the facial features weren't very clear, Phylidor replied that he was surprised that they expected to see more details in a ghost. Then Von der Eck confronted Phylidor with the question if it wasn't all just optical illusions. Phylidor threatened with terrible dangers that would be caused by this behavior. Von der Eck and other audience members then demanded to see Phylidor raise the devil, if he would still insist that he really had supernatural powers. He pleaded not to have to do this, but instead to raise the spirit of the deceased father of an Englishman in the audience, as agreed upon a few days earlier.

He conjured up this apparition, but the image showed a figure in too fashionable an outfit for someone who had died a few years before. In the meantime the smoke had become too irritating and some men called for light and wanted the door to be opened. Phylidor proposed to make King Heinrich IV appear, but couldn't calm his audience and accepted his defeat. Some of the men warned him that it would not end well if he was to perform his deceitful tricks again.

==== Aftermath ====
The morning after Phylidor's failed séance, he was told by the police not to perform his magic again, because it went "against religion and good manners", and he was ordered to leave Berlin.

After Phylidor had left, Von der Eck examined the room and found some evidence that the apparitions were created by rear projection on a transparent screen in the wall. He also found traces of a metal wire that had been attached to the walls, which he thought was intended to ignite some combustible materials to create the illusion of the complete room being on fire.

=== Vienna (February 1790 to January 1792) ===
Phylidor had further developed his show when he came to Vienna and claimed to have perfected his ghostly apparitions with a totally new invention. He advertised his show in March 1790 as "Phantasmorasi, oder natürlicher Geister Erscheinungen" (Phantasmorasi, or natural ghost apparitions), besides very entertaining magnetic-mechanical experiments in his renewed Cabinet of Physics. Spectators would first gather and wait silently in an anteroom, until the physicist ordered them to enter a black-curtained room decorated with skeletons, two candles and a white circle on the ground.

The very solemn performance would start with the sound of thunder that would grow louder and louder, accompanied by hail and wind. Lights would extinguish themselves one by one and flames would rise from the lamps before being extinguished and rendering the room in total darkness. Then ghosts of all sizes and shapes would fly around in a circle. After a very fierce storm, a summoned lifelike ghost of a person known to the audience would eventually rise from the floor to slowly sink back into the abyss in the ground.

Ghosts would appear in various ways; one would suddenly be there, another would slowly shape itself from a grey cloud and yet another would approach from far away and come so close that one could touch it. Some apparitions would take a few steps closer to the audience before disappearing. Spectators were spared any annoyance of foul tastes or odors and could count on a pleasant experience.

The show would start at seven in the evening and last one and a half hour. There would be three public performances a week. Private shows for parties up to 24 people could be booked for the remaining days. One review stated that no optical or other tricks could be discerned. However, this "review" could have been part of Phylidor's newspaper promotions: it is somewhat similar to advertisements and handbills that also described the show.

=== "Phantasmagorie", Paris (December 1792 to July 1793) ===
A "Phantasmagorie" by Paul Filidort in Paris was first advertised on 16 December 1792. It was several years into the French Revolution and the audience were particularly open to the idea of seeing their dead heroes. However, with tensions running high and Philidor's shows increasingly making political references it was not long until he found himself in trouble with the authorities. Philidor made references to well-known revolutionaries of the day, making Maximilien Robespierre, Georges Danton, and Jean-Paul Marat appear as if they were the devil.

According to the memoirs of Madame Tussaud, a "Monsieur Phillipstal" was arrested after the audience of a phantasmagoria show protested at what they interpreted as a depiction of the rise of Louis XVI to heaven, caused by a mistake by an assistant who was removing the slide during projection. Phillipsthal's wife would have bribed authorities so he was released from prison. However, this may be only legend as also Robertson is associated with trouble after showing a slide of Louis XVI, which Tussaud might have read in Robertson's Mémoirs (1831-1833) and mixed-up with Philipsthal.

=== Batavian Republic (1798-1800) ===
In 1798 "Phycisist" Phylidor exhibited his "Large Cabinet of Mechanical and Optical Arts" including ghostly apparitions and life-size mechanical figures in several cities of the Batavian Republic (now a large part of the Netherlands). In Rotterdam during the summer of 1799 Phylidor advertised his cabinet to have considerably increased since the year before and especially mentions his peacock automaton, which ate and drank as if it were real. The performance took place in a tent in the Gebakken Pauwesteeg ("Baked Peacock Alley"). Returning to Groningen in 1800 "Physici Phylidor & Compn." advertised their totally new wondrous mechanical and optical pieces of art, by candlelight and accompanied by music.

=== Great Britain (1801-1829) ===
In October 1801 M. Philipsthal set up an exhibition of Phantasmagoria at the Lyceum Theatre, London. It was a huge success and soon other showmen presented their versions of phantasmagoria.

After a short break Philidor reopened his show with the wax museum of Marie Tussaud alongside. Tussaud had left France to join up with Philidor, who agreed to allow her to associate with his fame for half of her profits. She would go on to travel Great Britain and Ireland until settling down for a permanent exhibition on Baker Street in 1835.

Philipsthal would take his show to other large cities in Britain over the years.

Between May 1811 and April 1813 Philipsthal was joined by a mister Maillardet to exhibit the Royal Mechanical and Optical Museum in theatres in England. It consisted of their Musical Automatons, Mechanical Rope-Dancers, (as Large Life,) Singing Bird, and many other wonders.

Philipsthal gave his last shows with his Royal Mechanical and Optical Museum in February 1829 in Leeds, a few weeks before his death.

== Travels ==
Phylidor traveled across parts of Europe, mainly visiting the capitals and larger cities:

- Middelburg (Dutch Republic) in December 1785 - January 1786
- Vlissingen (Dutch Republic) in January 1786
- Groningen (Dutch Republic) in March - April 1786
- Lübeck (Free and Hanseatic City), July 1786
- Saint Petersburg (Russia), January 1787
- Berlin (Prussia), February and March 1789
- Leipzig (Electorate of Saxony), May 1789
- Dresden (Electorate of Saxony), June 1789
- Vienna (Austria), February 1790 to January 1792
- Regensburg (Free Imperial City of the Holy Roman Empire), July 1792
- München (Bavaria), July 1792
- Paris (France), December 1792 to July 1793
- Solothurn (Old Swiss Confederacy), December 1793
- Winterthur (Old Swiss Confederacy), 1794.
- return to Regensburg (Free Imperial City), June 1796 / March 1797 / June 1797
- Haarlem (Batavian Republic), June 1798
- Utrecht (Batavian Republic), July 1798
- Rotterdam (Batavian Republic), August 1798
- Amsterdam (Batavian Republic), between August and November 1798
- The Hague (Batavian Republic), November 1798
- Leiden (Batavian Republic), December 1798? to March 1799
- return to Utrecht (Batavian Republic), July 1799
- return to Rotterdam (Batavian Republic), August 1799
- return to Groningen (Batavian Republic), April to May 1800
- Bremen (Free Imperial City), 1800.
- return to Leipzig (Duchy of Saxony), 1800.
- Hamburg (Free and Hanseatic City) December 1800 - January 1801 / May 1801.
- Geneva (Léman), 1801.

== See also ==
- Étienne-Gaspard Robert
- Johann Georg Schröpfer
