= Jeanne des Anges =

French Nun (1602-1665)

Jeanne des Anges OSU
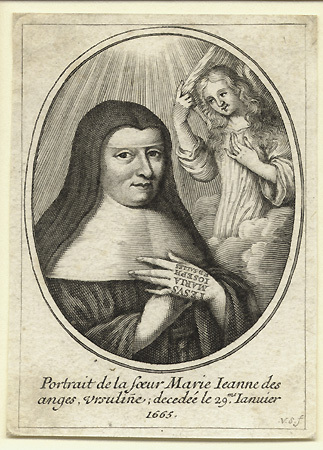
- Portrait of Sister Marie Ieanne des Anges, Ursuline, died on the 29th. Ianvier 1665.
- Born: February 2, 1602; Cozes
- Died: January 29, 1665 (aged 62); Loudun
- Occupation: Nun
- Notable work: Autobiographie (1644)

Jeanne des Anges, OSU (2 February 1602 – 29 January 1665), also known as Jeanne de Belcier, was a French Ursuline nun in Loudun. She became mother superior of the convent at a young age but is chiefly remembered as a central figure in the Loudun possessions in 1632, which led, after witch trials, to the burning at the stake of the priest Urbain Grandier.

== Early life ==
Jeanne de Belcier was born at Cozes in 1602, the daughter of Louis de Belcier, Baron de Cozes, and Charlotte de Goumard. An accident during childhood left her permanently disabled and she was put under the care of an aunt at the Benedictine abbey of Sainte-Marie-des-Dames. Finding the Benedictine life too hard, she returned home on the death of her aunt. In 1622 she entered the convent of Ursulines de Poitiers. She made her vows a year later taking the religious name of Jeanne des Anges. In 1627, she transferred to the new Ursuline convent at Loudun, and soon afterwards became its mother superior, perhaps because of her high social standing.

== Loudun ==
Father Urbain Grandier was already the parish priest at Saint-Pierre du Marché in Loudun at that time. He was an important figure with powerful friends but had previously been involved in scandal and controversy. Jeanne was sexually fascinated with him, writing in her autobiography, "When I did not see him, I burned with love for him and when he presented himself to me […] I lacked the faith to combat the impure thoughts and movements that I felt."

Unaware that Sister Jeanne had become obsessed with him, Grandier turned down an invitation to become the spiritual director of the convent after their former spiritual director, Father Moussault, had died. Then in 1632, Sister Jeanne stated that Grandier's spectral image had appeared to her, seduced her and taken from her "that which she had vowed to keep for her heavenly husband Jesus Christ." About the same time, other sisters began to complain of disturbed nights, and of seeing ghostly men, including Moussault and Grandier, moving about the building.

Under exorcism, the nuns accused Grandier of causing them to be possessed. On further examination, over two dozen of them were found to be "bewitched, obsessed, or possessed" but none to as great extent as Sister Jeanne, who was said to be afflicted with seven demons. Exorcisms took place in the convent and around the town, continuing for several years with Sister Jeanne playing a prominent role. Grandier was arrested and questioned before being tried by an ecclesiastical court, which acquitted him. However, Grandier had a powerful enemy, and Cardinal Richelieu, the chief minister of France, took an interest in the matter. He ordered a new trial for witchcraft to be conducted by his special envoy. Despite Sister Jeanne and the nuns withdrawing their complaint, Grandier was convicted, tortured and put to death by burning at the stake.

== Speculation ==
At one time Sister Jeanne manifested the symptoms of false pregnancy, and this and the Loudun possessions have been much discussed over the years. In 1635, Sister Jeanne was said to have been marked by a cross on her forehead which bled continually for three weeks. Several authorities have come to the conclusion that these manifestations were a result of hysteria in the case of Sister Jeanne and mass hysteria in the case of the other nuns.

== In media ==
Jeanne des Anges wrote an autobiographical account of her life, and a film, directed by Jerzy Kawalerowicz and entitled Mère Jeanne des Anges (Mother Joan of the Angels) was released in 1961, starring Lucyna Winnicka, Mieczyslaw Voit and Anna Ciepielewska. An edition of the Autobiographie in 352 pages was printed from Éditions Jérôme Millon (first edition 1985, with a second edition published in 1990).

Ken Russell's film The Devils (1971) is also based on the events, although even more loosely. Russell's film – which stars Vanessa Redgrave as Sister Jeanne and Oliver Reed as Urbain Grandier – is based on two literary sources, Aldous Huxley's 1952 book The Devils of Loudun and John Whiting's 1960 play The Devils. Huxley's book deals extensively with Sister Jeanne's life after the execution of Grandier, including Jeanne's relationship with the Jesuit mystic Jean-Joseph Surin. On stage, the role of Sister Jeanne has been portrayed in Whiting's play by actresses including Dorothy Tutin, Anne Bancroft, and Joanna McCallum.

Polish composer Krzysztof Penderecki's opera Die Teufel von Loudun, commissioned by the Hamburg State Opera, written in 1968 and 1969, and revised by Penderecki in 2012, features Sister Jeanne as a lead character and dramatic soprano. The 1969 premiere cast starred Tatiana Troyanos in the role of Sister Jeanne. Troyanos reprised the role in the 1969 television movie Die Teufel von Loudun, a studio production of Penderecki's opera filmed after the Hamburg State Opera premiere. The 2022 filmed version of Die Teufel von Loudun stars Aušrinė Stundyte as Sister Jeanne.
