= Jean-Joseph Surin =

French Jesuit priest, mystic, writer, and exorcist (1600–1665)

Jean-Joseph Surin (French: [syʁɛ̃]; 9 February 1600 – 21 April 1665) was a French Jesuit priest, mystic, devotional writer and exorcist. He is remembered for his participation in the exorcisms of Loudun in 1634–37.

He was born and died in Bordeaux.

== Early life ==
Surin was born on 9 February 1600 in Bordeaux. His father, Jean de Seurin, seigneur de Labatut, was a lawyer and a council member of the Bordeaux Parliament. Surin's mother was Jeanne d’Arrerac a daughter of the parliament councillor and author Jean d’Arrerac, seigneur d'Arsac of Medoc and Catherine de Mansencal. Surin's paternal grandfather was André Seurin, a silk merchant of Toulouse.

It is not clear if Surin's family were part of the nobility, but they were wealthy and well-respected. His father Jean de Surin and his brother Pierre de Seurin, seigneur de Chelivettes were both members of the noblesse de robe (English: Nobles of the robe), the new legal nobility, so it must be assumed that he was held in some esteem in the area and that the family belonged to the social elite of Bordeaux. Surin's maternal uncle Gabriel d’Arrerac was trésorier général of Guyenne and was married to a niece of Michel de Montaigne.

Out of the five children born to the couple, Surin was the eldest and only surviving son. He also had two younger sisters, Jeanne, (b. 1604) who entered a Carmelite convent in 1619, and Anne-Marie (b.1607) who married and died soon after her marriage.

Bordeaux is known to have had a high presence of religious orders due to the influence of the archbishop François d'Escoubleau de Sourdis. His support of the Catholic reform saw many religious orders establish themselves in the city. Jesuits were among the most well-represented in the city.

Surins father was known to haven give sizable donations to the local Jesuit college in his will. Surins mother was also very religious and after the death of her daughter Jeanne she would claim to have had a vision of her. She entered a convent after the death of her husband. She took the name Anne-Therese de Saint-Joseph upon joining the Carmelite order. A younger sister of his mother's, Anne d'Arrerac, was a nun and mother superior as part of the order Compagnie des Filles de Marie Notre-Dame in Poitiers.

From a young age Surin was reared in a cloister. At the age of eight he took a vow of chastity, and at ten he was taught to meditate by a Carmelite. Surin was also inspired by the preachings of and conversations with a Spanish Carmelite nun, Isabella des Anges, who introduced him to Jesuit mysticism and the writings of St. Teresa of Avila.

Surin entered the novitiate with the Jesuits in 1616. From 1623 to 1625 and from 1627 to 1629 he studied at the Collège de Clermont in Paris. As a priest he practiced severe self-denial and cut himself off from nearly all social contact.

== Demonic possession at Loudun ==
=== Background ===
In the early 1630s, a convent of Ursuline nuns said they had been visited and possessed by demons. Suspicion soon fell upon Urbain Grandier, parish priest of Saint-Pierre-du-Marché in the town of Loudun, as the cause of the possessions. Grandier was already a controversial figure in the town because of a longstanding quarrel with the local church authorities. In the following weeks, numerous nuns were supposedly attacked and possessed by evil spirits: the Loudun possessions. This reached a point that exorcism rituals were organized by the local clergy. It was during these rites that the nuns accused Grandier of being in league with the devil and initiating their demonic possession. He was also accused of seducing the nuns.

Following a series of trials, Grandier was convicted. He was executed by burning on 18 August 1634, never having admitted guilt, even under torture. The demons then began leaving the nuns, but the improvement was only temporary. Jeanne des Anges, mother-superior of the convent, remained possessed by seven different demons.

=== Surin's arrival at Loudun and his work there ===
After missions in Guyenne and Saintonge, Surin was sent to Loudun in December 1634 to help with the exorcism of Jeanne des Anges. He was so horrified at the terrible sacrileges intended for three desecrated hosts that he immediately made an offering of his own spirit to be possessed by demons in expiation for this intended sacrilege. His prayer was granted, and for more than twenty years he was harassed by evil spirits, experiencing hallucinations, seizures and temporary paralysis, and he slowly lost his power of speech. He felt suicidal despair over his eternal damnation. At times he was unable to use his hands, his feet, his eyes, his tongue, or was impelled to commit a thousand extravagances, which even the most charitably inclined deemed foolish. The delusions under which he labored at such times caused him the greatest joy.

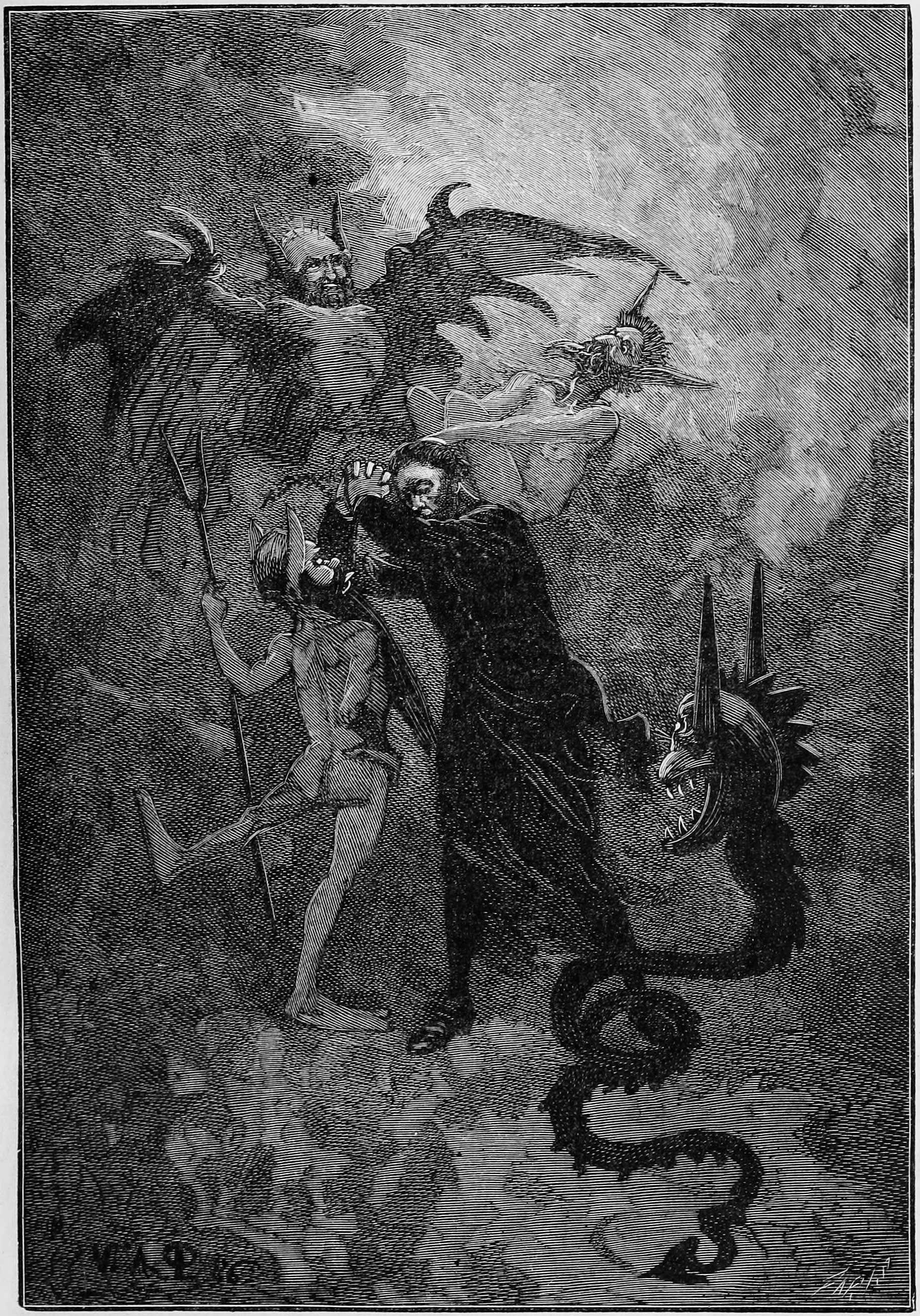
"Father Surin chasing the demon Isaacarum. (1886) by Victor-Armand Poirson

While he was entering this state, Jeanne des Anges was slowly recovering. "During my ministry, the devil passed from the body of the possessed person and entered into mine" he wrote to a friend, the Jesuit father Achille Doni d'Attichy. Surin believed that the devil particularly hated Carmelites and that a relic of St. Teresa that he had used at Loudun had miraculously expelled one of the demons.

=== Surin's continuing possession ===
In 1645 Surin attempted suicide by jumping out of a second-story window, but he survived.

According to the Catholic Encyclopedia:

At no time, however, did this state of obsession prevent his devoting himself to preaching. It is true he was unable to prepare himself for this by any reading or study, but on entering the pulpit and making the sign of the cross a wonderful transformation was manifest. His vigorous mind instantly gained the ascendancy; his powerful voice and facile oratory won universal attention and admiration. His physician declared it miraculous. Even in writing or dictating his works he seemed gifted with Divine inspiration. He was healed eight years before his death and was thenceforth absorbed in the abundance of Divine communications.

== Connections with the Condés ==
Surin's cousin Jean de Belhade, chevalier de Thodias was a loyal supporter and military commander of the Grand Condé during The Fronde which saw him rewarded with governing the duchy of Fronsac on behalf of the Grand Condé and then he was made mayor (French: jurat) of Bordeaux.

Its possibly through this connection that Surin became acquaintanced with the Grand Condé and his brother Armand de Bourbon, Prince of Conti.

Conti when young had studied theology in Bourges. He was also a Jansenist and was interested in Jesuit mysticism and would take great interest in Surin and his work, and even helped publish his book Catéchisme Spirituel in 1656. The two maintained a friendship until Surin's death.

== Evaluation ==
Surin enjoyed great celebrity for his virtues, his trials, and his talents as a spiritual director. Bossuet declared him "consumed with spirituality". At the suggestion of the fathers of the Province of Aquitaine, assembled in provincial congregation (1755), the father general ordered his name inscribed in the "Ménologe de l'assistance de France".

He was not universally respected, however, as this excerpt from a letter by Jacques Nau shows:

Père Surin, whom I myself knew for twenty years or more, led so deranged and shameful a life that one hardly dares speak of it. In the end it reached the point where the most wise attributed it all, quite correctly I believe, to madness …I have often seen [him] blaspheme the name of God and walk about naked in the College, soiled with excrement – I would then take him by the hand into the infirmary. I have seen him lashing out with his fists and for years perform a hundred other insanities, even to the point of trying to trample on the Sacrament of the Eucharist – I did not see this myself but learnt it the next day from witnesses. He lived like this for several years. For the rest of his life, he never fulfilled any function within the Society. When he recovered self-control, he wrote books and letters, visited his neighbor and spoke very well about God, but he never said his prayers, or read his Breviary, said Mass rarely and to his dying day mumped about and gesticulated in a ridiculous and absurd fashion.

== Surin in popular culture ==
In 1952 Aldous Huxley published his nonfiction book on the exorcisms, titled The Devils of Loudun. Playwright John Whiting adapted Huxley's book as the play The Devils (1960). Ken Russell directed a feature film adaptation of Huxley's book and Whiting's play, The Devils (1971), starring Vanessa Redgrave and Oliver Reed. Surin is not depicted in the film although he is mentioned in the narration of the film's UK theatrical trailer.

Surin is depicted by Mieczysław Voit as "Father Józef Suryn" in the 1961 Polish film Mother Joan of the Angels (Matka Joanna od Aniołów)

Krzysztof Penderecki wrote an opera, The Devils of Loudun (Die Teufel von Loudun) in 1969.

== Works ==
Surin's French prose was widely admired and his hundreds of letters, copied and recopied by the faithful, circulated throughout France.

His principal published works include:

- Le Triomphe de l'amour divin sur les puissances de l'enfer en la possession de la Mère supérieure des Ursulines de Loudun (Triumph of Divine Love over the Powers of Hell) (1636)
- Catéchisme spirituel (1654), published by the Prince de Conti, anonymously
- Dialogues spirituels (1655)
- Cantiques spirituels (1657)
- Science expérimentale des choses de l'autre vie acquise en la possession des Ursulines de Loudun (1663)
- Fondements de la vie spirituelle (Paris, 1667)
- Lettres spirituelles (Paris, 1695).
- Correspondance, published in 1966 by Michel de Certeau
- The Foundations of the Spiritual Life (London, 1844)
- Surin, Jean-Joseph; Sluhovsky, Moshe (2018). Into the dark night and back: the mystical writings of Jean-Joseph Surin. doi:10.1163/9789004387652. ISBN 978-90-04-38765-2.

His Catéchisme spirituel was placed on the Index in 1695 for its seeming affinity with the non-discursive prayer of the Quietists. It was retained in the revision of 1900.
