= The Devils (film) =

1971 film by Ken Russell

- US theatrical release poster
- Directed by: Ken Russell
- Screenplay by: Ken Russell
- Based on: The Devils by John Whiting; The Devils of Loudun by Aldous Huxley
- Produced by: Robert H. Solo; Ken Russell
- Starring: Vanessa Redgrave; Oliver Reed
- Cinematography: David Watkin
- Edited by: Michael Bradsell
- Music by: Peter Maxwell Davies
- Production company: Russo Productions
- Distributed by: Warner Bros.
- Release dates: 16 July 1971 (United States); 25 July 1971 (United Kingdom)
- Running time: 115 minutes (Note: The 115-minute runtime refers to the 2026 release of the director's cut. The original 1971 British theatrical cut runs 111 minutes, while the 1971 U.S. theatrical cut runs approximately 108–109 minutes.)
- Countries: United Kingdom; United States
- Language: English
- Budget: $4.8 million
- Box office: $11 million (1971 rentals); $5.4 million (2026 re-release)

The Devils is a 1971 historical psychological horror drama film directed, written, and co-produced by Ken Russell, starring Vanessa Redgrave and Oliver Reed. Based in part on the 1952 non-fiction book The Devils of Loudun by Aldous Huxley, as well as John Whiting's subsequent 1960 play The Devils, the film dramatises the fall of Urbain Grandier, a 17th-century Catholic priest accused of witchcraft after the possessions in Loudun, France. The plot also focuses on Sister Jeanne des Anges, a sexually repressed nun obsessed with Grandier, who inspires the accusations.

An international co-production between the United Kingdom and United States, United Artists initially pitched the idea to Russell, but bowed out after reading his finished screenplay, as they felt it was too controversial in nature. Warner Bros. agreed to produce and distribute, and filming largely took place at Pinewood Studios in late 1970.

The film's graphic portrayal of violent and sexual content, combined with its religious themes, ignited harsh reaction from censors, and it originally received an X rating in both the United Kingdom and the United States. It was banned in several countries, and heavily edited for exhibition in others. Critics largely dismissed The Devils on initial release for its explicit content, though it won awards for Best Director at the 33rd Venice International Film Festival, as well as from the U.S. National Board of Review. The Devils has been recognised as one of the most controversial films ever made by numerous publications and critics, and remained banned in Finland until 2001. Although a director's cut supervised by Russell was given its first theatrical release in the UK in 2004, it was not made officially available on home media, and edited releases on DVD and streaming services remained scant.

Following a debut at the 2026 Cannes Film Festival on 14 May 2026, Warner Bros. Clockwork theatrically released a 4K restoration of the director's cut, titled Ken Russell's The Devils, in North America for one week beginning 16 October 2026, and in the UK and Ireland on 30 October in partnership with BFI Distribution; it received an official NC-17 rating from the Motion Picture Association for "sexual content/graphic nudity". The restoration received widespread critical acclaim and was successful at the North American box office, leading its initial run to be extended indefinitely due to audience demand, as well as its first official home media release being scheduled for the following April.

== Plot ==
In 1634 France, following the Huguenot rebellions, French Catholic statesman Cardinal Richelieu influences King Louis XIII in an attempt to gain further power. Seeking to systematically divest France's local lords of their power and centralise the country's government, Richelieu convinces Louis that the fortifications of cities throughout France should be demolished to prevent Protestant uprisings. Louis agrees, but forbids Richelieu from carrying out demolitions in the fortified town of Loudun, having promised the Governor not to damage the town.

The Governor of Loudun – where Catholics and Huguenots live harmoniously – dies, leaving control of the city to Urbain Grandier, a dissolute, proud, popular priest. He is having an affair with a relative of Canon Jean Mignon, another priest in the town, though he ends the affair upon learning of the woman's pregnancy. Unbeknownst to Grandier, the neurotic, hunchbacked Sister Jeanne des Anges, the abbess of the local Ursuline convent, is sexually obsessed with him. Jeanne asks Grandier to become the convent's new confessor. Grandier secretly marries Madeleine De Brou, but Jeanne discovers this and becomes jealous. When Madeleine returns a book by Ursuline foundress Angela Merici that Jeanne had lent her, Jeanne attacks her and accuses her of being a sacrilegious fornicator.

Baron Jean de Laubardemont arrives with orders to demolish the city's walls, overriding Grandier's orders to stop. Grandier summons the town's soldiers and forces Laubardemont to repeal pending the arrival of a demolition order from King Louis. Grandier departs Loudun to visit the King. Meanwhile, Mignon tells Jeanne that he is their new confessor. She informs him of Grandier's marriage and affairs, inadvertently accusing Grandier of witchcraft and possessing her. Mignon informs Laubardemont, spreading word that Grandier has bewitched the convent and dealt with the Devil. With Grandier away, Laubardemont and Mignon search for evidence against him.

Laubardemont summons inquisitor Father Pierre Barre, a "professional witch-hunter", whose interrogations involve depraved acts of "exorcism", including forced enemas. Barre gets Jeanne to confess that Grandier has bewitched her. Laubardemont threatens to execute the other nuns for treason for trying to stop Barre's brutal interrogation of Jeanne, but Barre suggests the nuns are also possessed by Grandier and the devil. The nuns all quickly agree, sparing them. A public exorcism erupts in a church, in which the nuns strip and enter a state of "religious" frenzy. Duke Henri de Condé – actually King Louis in disguise – arrives, claiming to have a holy relic, the blood of Jesus Christ. Barre uses the relic to "exorcise" the nuns, who act as though they have been cured until Louis reveals the case allegedly containing the relic to be empty. The possessions and the exorcisms continue unabated, descending into a massive orgy in which the nuns remove the crucifix from above the high altar and masturbate with it. Mignon is both shocked and aroused by the chaos.

Grandier and Madeleine return. Grandier denies bewitching the nuns and condemns Jeanne, but he and Madeleine are arrested nonetheless. The nuns return to the convent, where Jeanne attempts to hang herself, but is cut down before she dies. After being given a show trial, Grandier is shaven and tortured. The judges sentence Grandier to death by burning at the stake. Despite pressure to confess to the charges, Grandier refuses, and is taken to be publicly burnt. His executioner promises to strangle him rather than let him suffer death by fire, but Barre starts the fire himself, and Mignon, panicked about the possibility of Grandier's innocence, pulls the noose tight before it can be used to strangle Grandier. As Grandier burns, Laubardemont, having obtained permission to destroy the city's fortifications, orders for explosive charges to be set off. The city walls explode, causing the revelling townspeople to flee.

After the execution, Barre leaves Loudun to continue witch-hunting in the Vienne region of Nouvelle-Aquitaine. Laubardemont informs Jeanne that Mignon has been sent to an asylum for claiming that Grandier was innocent, and that "with no signed confession to prove otherwise, everyone has the same opinion". He gives her Grandier's charred femur and leaves. Jeanne kisses the bone and masturbates with it. Madeleine, having been released, staggers over the rubble of Loudun's walls and walks out of the ruined city.

== Cast ==
- Vanessa Redgrave as Sister Jeanne des Anges
- Oliver Reed as Father Urbain Grandier
- Dudley Sutton as the Baron de Laubardemont
- Max Adrian as Ibert
- Gemma Jones as Madeleine de Brou
- Murray Melvin as Father-Canon Jean Mignon
- Michael Gothard as Father Pierre Barre
- Georgina Hale as Philippe Trincant
- Brian Murphy as Adam
- Christopher Logue as Cardinal Richelieu
- Graham Armitage as King Louis XIII of France
- John Woodvine as Louis Trincant
- Andrew Faulds as Rangier
- Kenneth Colley as Legrand
- Judith Paris as Sister Agnes (Note: Paris' role is mislabeled in the credits as "Sister Judith", though her character's actual name is Agnes.)
- Catherine Willmer as Sister Catherine
- Iza Teller as Sister Iza

== Themes ==
"The most passionate and articulate of political films, The Devils is intellectual and feverish, absolutely inspired in its design, appropriately terrifying, and yes, outrageous – because it is outraged. This may be the cinema's most damning indictment of humankind, and it is refreshed every time someone fails to see beyond the shame it depicts to its spine of dignity."

— Tim Lucas on the film's political messaging

Addressing the film's initial reaction among critics, social groups and Warner Bros. executives, film historian Tim Lucas describes The Devils as "not merely an indictment of 17th Century conspiracies, but an indictment of political agendas which have been with us throughout the course of human history. When government is at its most immoral, history shows that it tends to ally itself with the Church, and to deflect public attention from its own corruption by demonizing convenient scapegoats—artists, philosophers, progressives... in a word, liberals." Comparing Grandier's demonization to various issues of contention in the United States during various decades of the 20th century, from alcohol in the 1920s to tobacco smoking in the 1990s, he notes that although public opinion on such issues evolves over time, the film articulates that "in the crossfire of ideals and oratory, lives are sometimes destroyed."

Meanwhile, film scholar Thomas Atkins attests that, while The Devils contains overt themes regarding religion and political influence, the film is more concerned with "sex and sexual aberrations". He interprets the film as being centrally thematically interested in sexual repression and its cumulative effects on the human psyche. Commenting on the Sister Jeanne character, Atkins writes: "There are any number of examples of tormented visualization involving the Mother Superior... What more stunning visual metaphor for the psychological suffocation of the Mother Superior than to stuff her deformed body into a tiny lookout space from which she watches her fantasy lover? The mere confinement of mass in congested space creates an understanding of the annihilating pleasures of her sexual drive." Atkins likens Sister Jeanne's erotic fantasy sequences to "eroticism from a deranged consciousness". Filmmaker Alex Cox concurs with this point, stating that The Devils "could have been a turgid tale of human rights versus intolerance", but instead became something "much more: an intense, at times surreal, at times hideously realistic story of sexual obsession and oppression".

The color white is featured significantly, specifically in the design of the cityscape, which largely consists of overtly white stone structures. Atkins insists that through this use of blank white, Russell establishes a "leitmotif of whiteness which resists and dissolves natural relationships"; Adam Scovell further notes that the "horrifying white-clean aesthetic" of Russell and Jarman's vision of Loudun appears to be inspired by Sister Jeanne's exorcism being compared to a "rape in a public lavatory" in the Huxley novel.

== Production ==
=== Development ===
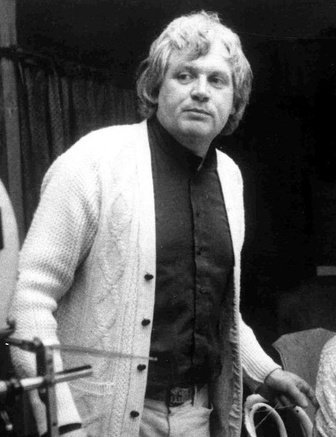
Writer-director Ken Russell in 1971

In November 1965, following the Broadway opening of John Whiting's 1961 play The Devils—which was based on Aldous Huxley's non-fiction book The Devils of Loudun (1952), about the alleged 17th-century possessions in Loudun, France—producer Alexander H. Cohen announced plans to adapt the play for film, revealing that he had made a formal offer to Huxley's estate for the rights. After Cohen's deal failed to materialize, United Artists signed a deal with producer Robert H. Solo to make the adaptation in August 1969.

Following the success of Women in Love (1969) in the United States, United Artists offered The Devils to director Ken Russell. According to journalist John Baxter and Russell's widow Lisi Tribble, he was familiar with the story by the time United Artists proposed the project to him, having watched a production of Whiting's play in London and subsequently being inspired to research its historical basis. Russell said that "when I first read the story, I was knocked out by it—it was just so shocking—and I wanted others to be knocked out by it, too. I felt I had to make it." Russell later said at the time he made the film: "I was a devout Catholic and very secure in my faith. I knew I wasn't making a pornographic film... although I am not a political creature, I always viewed The Devils as my one political film. To me it was about brainwashing, about the state taking over."

Though Russell admired Whiting's play, his screenplay mainly drew from Huxley's book as he found the play "too sentimental". Some extraneous elements incorporated into the screenplay were not found in either source, including details about the plague, which were supplied by Russell's brother-in-law, a scholar of French history. Upon studying Grandier, Russell felt that he "represented the paradox of the Catholic church... Grandier is a priest but he is also a man, and that puts him into some absurd situations." In Russell's original screenplay, the role of Sister Jeanne of the Angels, the disabled Mother Superior, was significantly larger, and continued after Grandier's execution. However, in order to shorten the lengthy screenplay, Russell was forced to cut down the role.

United Artists announced the film in August 1969, with Solo to produce under a three-picture deal with the studio, and Russell to direct. Filming was set to start in May 1970. However, after United Artists executives read the screenplay, they "refused to touch it", abandoning plans to fund the production. At the time, production designer Derek Jarman had already constructed some of the sets for the film. It was subsequently acquired by Warner Bros., who signed on in March 1970 to distribute the film.

=== Casting ===
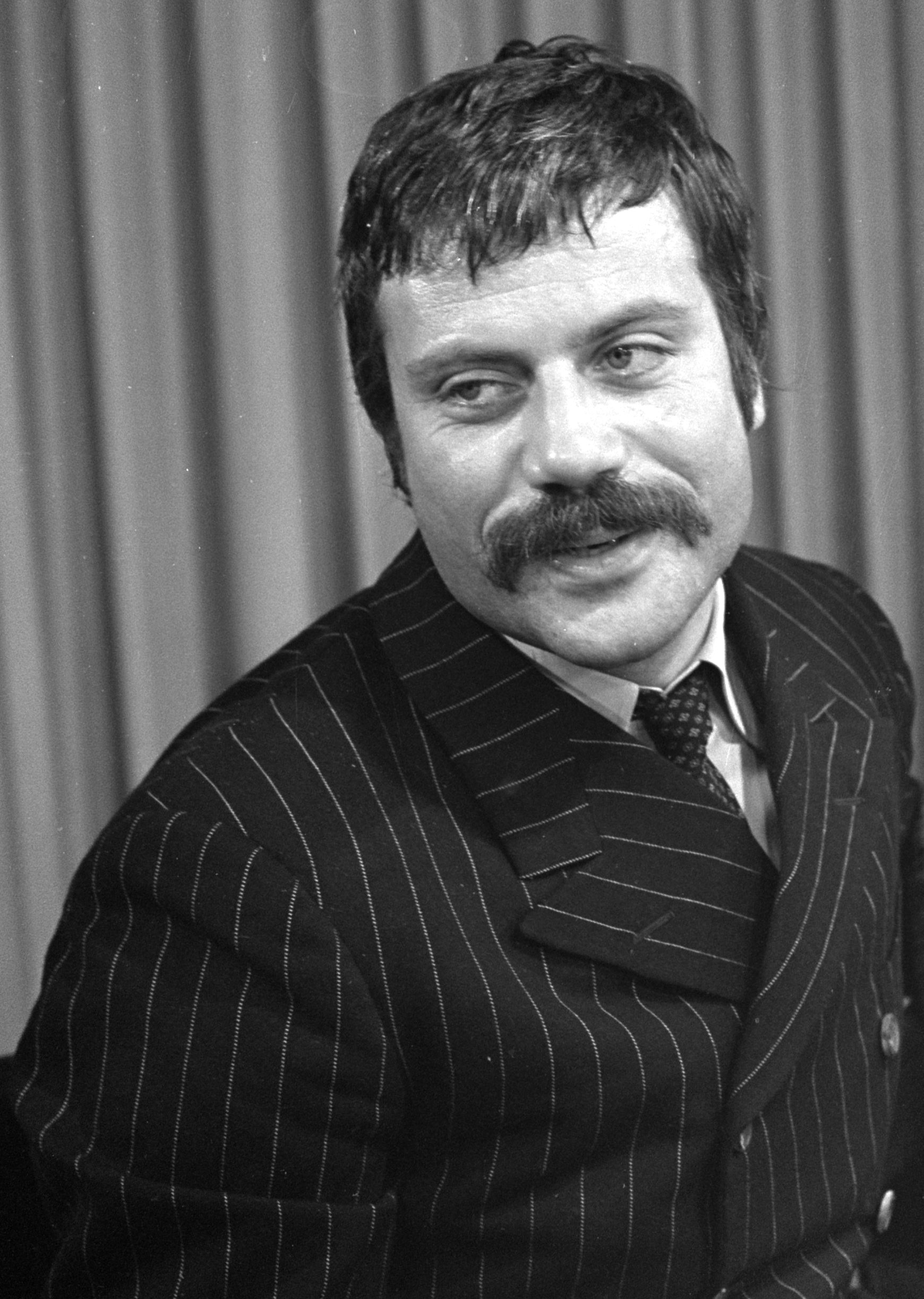
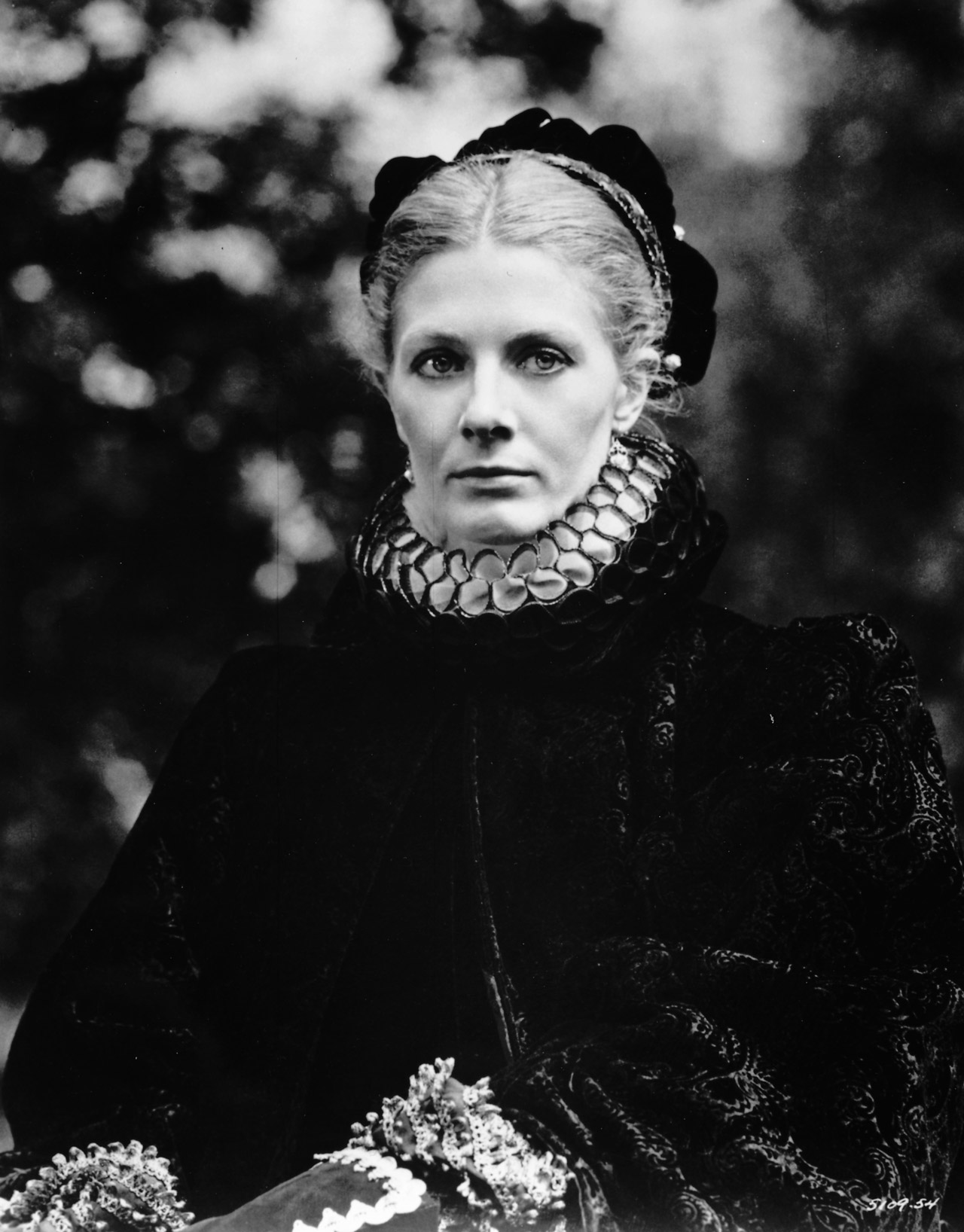
Oliver Reed and Vanessa Redgrave were cast as Urbain Grandier and Sister Jeanne des Anges, respectively.

Oliver Reed, who had worked with Russell previously on Women in Love, was cast as Urbain Grandier, the philandering doomed priest. Richard Johnson, who had portrayed Grandier in a stage production of The Devils, had originally been attached to the project in 1969, but eventually dropped out of the production. Reed agreed to do the film for a percentage of the profits. Gemma Jones was cast as Madeleine de Brou, Grandier's wife.

Sister Jeanne des Anges was originally to be played by Glenda Jackson, who had starred opposite Reed in Russell's Women in Love, as well as in Russell's The Music Lovers (1971). However, Jackson turned down the role saying: "I don't want to play any more neurotic sex starved parts." Russell later claimed that he felt Jackson had actually turned down the role because it had been truncated from his original screenplay. Jackson was replaced by Vanessa Redgrave.

Max Adrian was cast as inquisitor Ibert (in his second-to-last film performance), while Dudley Sutton, who had become a cult figure for his performance in The Leather Boys (1964), agreed to appear in the film as Baron de Laubardemont. Sutton recalled that all of the "respectable actors turned it down. They thought it was blasphemous, which it is not." In the role of Father Mignon, a priest who attempts to usurp Grandier's power, Russell cast Murray Melvin, despite the fact that he was decades younger than the character, who was intended to be in his eighties. Michael Gothard, an English character actor, was cast as self-professed witch hunter Father Barre. Russell cast Christopher Logue, an occasional actor who was mainly known as a poet and literary scholar, as the vengeful Cardinal Richelieu.

As Philippe, the young woman Grandier impregnates, Russell cast television actress Georgina Hale. Judith Paris, originally a dancer, was cast as Sister Agnes, Richelieu's niece who enters the convent under the guise of becoming a nun in order to gather information on Sister Jeanne. In the credits, her role is mislabeled as "Sister Judith".

Comedian Spike Milligan was cast as a character named Father Ambrose, but the actor and the role do not appear in the finished film.

=== Filming ===
Filming began 17 August 1970 in London at Pinewood Studios. The Devils marked Jarman's debut in the film industry; having previously worked in theatre, he was introduced to Russell by his friend, Hornsey College of Art teacher Janet Detuer, and agreed to work on the film after seeing Women in Love. His set for Loudun, which took three months to design, was the largest set constructed on Pinewood's backlot since Cleopatra (1963), and was influenced by the works of neoclassical artists such as Claude Nicolas Ledoux, Étienne-Louis Boullée and Giovanni Battista Piranesi. Russell and Jarman were further influenced by the cityscape in Fritz Lang's Metropolis (1927) and the blank white sets of Carl Theodor Dreyer's The Passion of Joan of Arc (1928). The interiors of many buildings, specifically the convent, were crafted with plaster and made to appear as masonry; the plaster designs were then nailed to plywood framework. According to Christopher Hobbs, the film's prop designer, Jarman "was very inexperienced, and found the work exhaustive and difficult", but Russell was very supportive of his ideas and designs.

Director Russell hired a large cast of extras, whom he later referred to as "a bad bunch" who were demanding, and alleged that one of the female extras appearing as a civilian was sexually assaulted by another male extra. Jones recalled that Reed, who at the time had a reputation for being disruptive and confrontational, was extremely kind to her on set, and "behaved impeccably". Sutton recalled of Redgrave that she was "always an adventurous type of person" on the set, in terms of exploring her character and interacting with the other performers. Russell echoed this sentiment, referring to Redgrave as "one of the least bothersome actresses I could ever wish for; she just threw herself into it."

Additional photography occurred at Bamburgh Castle in Northumberland, England. Jones recalled filming at the castle as challenging due to cold weather and having the flu during this period of the shoot, to which Russell was "frightfully unsympathetic". Throughout the shoot, Russell and Reed clashed frequently, and by the time principal photography had finished, the two were hardly on speaking terms.

=== Music ===
The film's score was composed for a small ensemble by Peter Maxwell Davies. Russell was reportedly intrigued by Davies' composition Eight Songs for a Mad King, which had provoked strong reactions when it was premiered in 1969. Davies reportedly took the job because he was interested in the late medieval and Renaissance historical period depicted in the film. He went on to write a score for Russell's next film, The Boy Friend. Australian promoter James Murdoch, who was also Davies' agent, was involved in organising the music for both these films.

The score was recorded by Davies' regular collaborators the Fires of London who took on extra players as the score required more instruments than their basic line-up. Davies' music is complemented by period music (including a couple of numbers from Terpsichore), performed by the Early Music Consort of London under the direction of David Munrow. In 1974, the Fires of London and the Early Music Consort of London gave a performance of a concert suite of the music at the Proms. Terpsichore, which was not well known when the film was made, has become a popular choice for concert hall performances, and Davies' contributions to the soundtrack have also been revived in the concert hall.

== Release and reception ==
=== Box office ===
The Devils was one of the most popular films in 1972 at the British box office, earning theatrical rentals of approximately $8–9 million in Europe. It was also popular in Italy. With an additional $2 million in the United States and Canada from a limited release, its worldwide rentals total roughly $11 million.

=== Critical reception ===
The Devils has been cited as one of the most controversial films of all time by such critics as Richard Crouse, among others. Filmsite included it in their list of the 100 most controversial films ever made, and in 2015, Time Out magazine ranked it 47 on their list of the "50 Most Controversial Movies in History".

The Devils received significant negative critical reaction upon its release due to its "outrageous", "overheated", and "pornographic" nature. The film was publicly condemned by the Vatican, who, though acknowledging that it contained some artistic merit, asked that its screenings at the Venice International Film Festival be cancelled. Judith Crist called the film a "grand fiesta for sadists and perverts", while Roger Ebert of the Chicago Sun-Times gave the film a rare zero-star rating, mocking what he saw as its sense of its own importance. Penelope Gilliatt wrote in The New Yorker that "instead of reporting hysteria, the movie adds to it." Vincent Canby, writing for The New York Times, noted that the film contains "silly, melodramatic effects", and felt that the performances were hindered by the nature of the screenplay, writing: "Oliver Reed suggests some recognizable humanity as poor Father Grandier, but everyone else is ridiculous. Vanessa Redgrave, who can be, I think, a fine actress, plays Sister Jeanne with a plastic hump, a Hansel-and-Gretel giggle, and so much sibilance that when she says 'Satan is ever ready to seduce us with sensual delights', you might think that Groucho Marx had let the air out of her tires." Pauline Kael wrote that while the "critics were turned off by the madness," audiences "were turned on by it."

Charles Champlin of the Los Angeles Times lambasted the film, writing that its message is "not anti-clerical—there's hardly enough clericalism to be anti anymore—it is anti-humanity. A rage against cruelty has become a celebration of it... you weep not for the evils and the ignorance of the past, but for the cleverness and sickness of the day." Ann Guarino of the New York Daily News noted that the film "could not be more anti-Catholic in tone or more sensationalized in treatment", but conceded that the performances in the film were competent. The Ottawa Citizen's Gordon Stoneham similarly felt the film had been over-sensationalized, noting that Russell focuses so much on the "baroque effects, and concentrates so much on the Grand Guignol aspects of the affair, the narrative is never firmly in focus."

Bridget Byrne of the Los Angeles Herald Examiner alternately praised the film as "brilliant, audacious, and grotesque", likening it to a fairytale, but added that audiences "have to grasp its philosophy, work out the undercurrents of seriousness, close the structural gaps for [themselves], even as [they] are transported by a literal orgy of splendor." Writing for the Hackensack, New Jersey Record, John Crittenden praised the film's visuals as "genius", but criticised Reed's performance while asserting that Redgrave was underused. Stephen Farber of The New York Times noted the film as an ambitious work, conceding that the "ideas in Russell's film may seem overly schematic, but his terrifying, fantastical nightmare images have astonishing psychological power."

Film historian Joel W. Finler described The Devils as Russell's "most brilliant cinematic achievement, but widely regarded as his most distasteful and offensive work." In 2002, when 100 filmmakers and critics were asked by Sight and Sound to cite what they considered to be the ten most important films ever made, The Devils featured in the lists submitted by Kermode and Cox; for the magazine's 2012 poll, the film appeared in the lists submitted by Kermode and Lucas, as well as those submitted by filmmaker Abel Ferrara and fellow critics Vic Pratt, Billy Chainsaw and David Sorfa.

On the review aggregator website Rotten Tomatoes, The Devils holds an approval rating of 55% based on 101 reviews, with an average rating of 8.2/10. The website's critics consensus reads, "Grimly stylish, Ken Russell's baroque opus is both provocative and persuasive in its contention that the greatest blasphemy is the leveraging of faith for power." On Metacritic, it has a weighted average score of 69 out of 100, based on 18 critics, indicating "generally favorable" reviews.

=== Censorship history ===
The explicit sexual and violent content, paired with its commentary on religious institutions, resulted in significant censorship. Commenting on the controversial nature, Reed stated: "We never set out to make a pretty Christian film. Charlton Heston made enough of those... The film is about twisted people." The British Board of Film Censors found the combination of religious themes and violent sexual imagery a serious challenge, particularly as the Board was being lobbied by socially conservative pressure groups such as the Festival of Light at the time of distribution. In order to gain a release and earn a British 'X' certificate (suitable for those aged 18 and over), Russell made minor cuts to the more explicit nudity (mainly in the cathedral and convent sequences), the licking of Christ's wounds during the dream sequence, details from the first exorcism (mainly that which indicated an anal insertion), some shots of the crushing of Grandier's legs, and a pantomime sequence prior to the climactic burning. Russell later said:

Trevelyan's objections to my original cut were that the scenes of torture—such as the skewering of Grandier's tongue with needles, or the breaking of his knees—simply went on too long. To him, these scenes needed only a few frames to tell the audience what was happening; after that, the sounds and their imaginations would fill in the rest. With the exception of one sequence ("The Rape of Christ") which was removed in its entirety, all Trevelyan did was to tone down or reduce the scenes as I had cut them.

"The Devils is a harsh film—but it's a harsh subject. I wish the people who were horrified and appalled by it would have read the book, because the bare facts are far more horrible than anything in the film."

— Russell on the film's controversial content

The most significant cuts were made by Warner Bros., prior to submission to the BBFC. Two notable scenes were removed in their entirety: One was a two-and-a-half-minute sequence featuring naked nuns sexually defiling a statue of Christ, which includes Father Mignon looking down on the scene and masturbating. Another scene towards the end showed Sister Jeanne masturbating with the charred femur of Grandier following his burning at the stake. Due to its content, the former scene has been popularly referred to as the "Rape of Christ" sequence.

The British theatrical cut, which runs 111 minutes, was given an 'X' certificate (no one under 18 years of age admitted); despite the BBFC's approval of this version, it was banned in 17 local councils across Britain. In the United States, it was truncated further for theatrical exhibition: The version submitted to the Motion Picture Association of America (MPAA) was edited to approximately 108 minutes, which was also awarded an 'X' rating. Russell expressed frustration, commenting that they "killed the key scene" [the Rape of Christ] and that "Warner Brothers cut out the best of The Devils." Speaking on the American version of the film, Russell said the cuts "adversely affected the story, to the point where in America the film is disjointed and incomprehensible." In 1973, in anticipation of a reissue of the film coinciding with their release of The Exorcist (1973), Warner Bros. resubmitted the American version of The Devils to the MPAA after further removing several allusions to lesbianism prior to Sister Jeanne's attempted suicide and a brief shot of Grandier's shattered legs during the torture scene; this version was given an 'R' rating. The film remained banned in Finland for over 30 years, until it was lifted in November 2001.

The director's cut (approximately 115 minutes), with two of the aforementioned scenes restored, was screened for the first time in London on 25 November 2002, along with a making-of documentary titled Hell on Earth, produced for Channel 4. The extended version was procured by Mark Kermode, who uncovered the footage in the Warner Bros. vaults. In a 2014 videoblog titled "Kermode Uncut: What To Do About The Devils", Kermode revealed that Warner Bros. was responsible for blocking various efforts to allow the director's cut of the film to be released on home media, as they considered the tone of the deleted material, specifically the "Rape of Christ" sequence, to be "distasteful". They also had turned down offers from distributors such as The Criterion Collection interested in buying the film or acquiring the North American sublicensing rights.

=== Accolades ===
| Institution | Category | Recipient | Result | Ref. |
|---|---|---|---|---|
| National Board of Review | Best Director | Ken Russell | Won | |
| 32nd Venice International Film Festival | Best Director – Foreign | Ken Russell | Won | |

=== Home media ===
The Devils has had a complicated release history in home media formats, with various cuts being made available in different formats. The film made its America home media debut circa 1979–1980, when ON TV made the 1973 'R' rated version available as part of its late night programming. Warner Home Video released the film on VHS in the United States in 1983, labelled as featuring a 105-minute cut of the film; however, this is a misprint, as this edition actually runs 103 minutes, due to time compression. Warner reissued a VHS edition in 1995, with a corrected label of a 103-minute running time. On 30 May 1995, the UK theatrical version made its debut on British television as part of BBC2's Forbidden Weekend, a series of films with troubled censorship histories; the screening was introduced by Cox and then-BBFC director James Ferman. This version was shown in a partially letterboxed aspect ratio of 1.80:1, with the credits being shown in the correct 2.35:1 ratio. Prior to this broadcast, the UK theatrical version had been shown on Sat.1 in Germany, with a 1.73:1 aspect ratio. A VHS was issued in the United Kingdom by Warner in 2002 as part of their "Masters of the Movies" series, reportedly running 104 minutes. However, according to film historian Richard Crouse, the VHS version available in the United Kingdom is identical to the American VHS editions, despite the labelled runtimes. Lucas notes that most VHS releases of the film featured either "sloppy" pan and scan work or poor letterboxing.

A bootlegged NTSC-format DVD was released by Angel Digital in 2005, with the excised footage reinstated, along with the Hell on Earth documentary included as a bonus feature. In 2008, it was suspected that Warner Home Video may have been planning a U.S. DVD release for the film, as cover artwork was leaked on the internet. However, Warner responded to the claim by deeming the leaked news an "error". In June 2010, Warner released The Devils in a 108-minute version for purchase and rental through the iTunes Store, but the title was removed without explanation three days later.

On 19 March 2012, the British Film Institute released a two-disc DVD featuring the 111-minute UK theatrical version (sped up to 107 minutes to accommodate the technicalities of PAL colour). The BFI release also includes the Kermode documentary Hell on Earth, as well as a vintage documentary shot during the production entitled Directing Devils, among other features.

In 2014, Mexican filmmaker Guillermo del Toro publicly criticized Warner Bros. for censoring the film and limiting its availability in home video markets. Del Toro was also a supporter of the social media campaign #FreeTheDevils along with the likes of Duncan Jones, Neil Gaiman and Lloyd Kaufman. The long-running advocacy movement was created in 2014, by filmmaker Dave King and Lisi Tribble Russell, to amplify the demand for The Devils to be granted a full restoration on home video. King also charted the film's turbulent history and the various home video and streaming releases in his 2016 article for Norway's Z Filmtidsskrift magazine and website.

In March 2017, streaming service Shudder began carrying the 109-minute U.S. release version of The Devils. In September 2018, FilmStruck began streaming the same U.S. cut and it was subsequently added to the Criterion Channel in October 2019, almost a year after FilmStruck shut down. The film was removed from Criterion's offerings shortly afterwards, but re-uploaded in January 2024.

=== Ken Russell’s The Devils ===
In May 2026, Warner Bros. announced that a 4K restoration of the director's cut of The Devils, created from the original camera negative, would be released through its newly launched Warner Bros. Clockwork label. The restoration premiered in the Cannes Classics section of the 2026 Cannes Film Festival on 14 May. Warner Bros. Clockwork gave the restoration a theatrical re-release in North America beginning 16 October 2026, while BFI Distribution, in partnership with Clockwork, re-released the film in the United Kingdom and Ireland on 30 October. The re-release has also been re-titled as Ken Russell’s The Devils.

Ahead of its North American re-release, the restored version received an NC-17 rating from the Motion Picture Association for "sexual content/graphic nudity". The classification returned the film to the MPA's adults-only category more than five decades after its original American release received an X rating; a further-cut version released in the United States in 1973 had received an R rating.

The restoration was acclaimed by critics. On Rotten Tomatoes, it holds an approval rating of 96% based on 52 reviews, with an average rating of 9.2/10. The website's critics consensus reads, "In its restored form, The Devils reveals the keen precision and focus beneath director Ken Russell's excesses, turning lurid religious hysteria and mob cruelty into a grotesque spectacle with profound moral force." Todd Gilchrist, reviewing the restoration for Fangoria, opined that "the director's cut is not only definitive, but superior" to previously released versions of the film, "not because it's more scandalous or explicit (though it is those things), but because its narrative is much clearer and more focused."

On 21 October 2026, Warner Bros. Clockwork announced that they had extended the film's theatrical release in the United States, initially intended to be a one-week-only event, for an additional week due to favorable box-office sales and popular demand. Further international releases were also announced the same day: Poland on October 23, France on October 28, Germany, Austria, Australia and New Zealand on October 29, and Greece and the Netherlands on November 12. On 29 October, Warner Bros. Clockwork announced that the film's American release had been extended indefinitely.

Following the success of the theatrical reissue, on 10 November, Warner Bros. Clockwork announced that the film would be released on home media for the first time ever in North America on 20 April 2027, in two Ultra HD Blu-ray editions; a standard version containing the fully restored director's cut in UHD, as well as a 3-disc collector's edition which adds the R-rated US & X-rated UK theatrical versions on separate Blu-ray discs, plus a large amount of bonus material.

== Legacy ==
Following his transition into experimental filmmaking, Jarman produced the Super 8 short film The Devils at the Elgin (1974). Described by Sam Ashby as a "hypnotic, nightmarish monochrome that loops some of the more religious iconographic moments" from Russell's original, the film was captured from a screening of The Devils at the Elgin Theater in New York City. Jarman noted that Maddeline's escape from Loudun in the original film's ending gave the impression that "she walks into a blizzard of ashes" when rendered on Super 8 stock. When screening The Devils at the Elgin at festivals or his studio, Jarman would synchronize the film to a cassette tape recording of Nico's cover version of the Doors' song "The End".

== See also ==
- Mother Joan of the Angels – a 1961 Polish film also based on the Loudun possessions
- The Devils of Loudun – a 1968 opera by Krzysztof Penderecki also based on the Huxley book and Whiting play
- List of cult films
- Extreme cinema

== Notes and references ==
=== Sources ===
- Atkins, Thomas R., ed. (1976). Ken Russell. Monarch Film Studies. New York City, New York: Simon & Schuster. ISBN 978-0-671-08102-7.
- Ashby, Sam (2012). The Devils (Imagining Loudun: The Devils and Derek Jarman) (booklet). British Film Institute. BFIVD940.
- Baxter, John (1973). An Appalling Talent: Ken Russell. London, England: Joseph Pub. ISBN 978-0-71-811075-8.
- Crouse, Richard (2012). Raising Hell: Ken Russell and the Unmaking of the Devils. ECW Press. ISBN 978-1-770-90281-7.
- Finler, Joel W. (1985). The Movie Directors Story. London: Octopus Books. ISBN 978-0-706-42288-7.
- Hanke, Ken (1984). Ken Russell's Films. Lanham, Maryland: Scarecrow Press. ISBN 978-0-810-81700-5.
- Harper, Sue (2011). British Film Culture in the 1970s: The Boundaries of Pleasure: The Boundaries of Pleasure. Edinburgh, Scotland: Edinburgh University Press. ISBN 978-0-748-65426-0.
- Kermode, Mark (1996). "The Devil Himself:Ken Russell". Video Watchdog. No. 35. pp. 53–58. ISSN 1070-9991.
- Lucas, Tim (1996). "Cutting the Hell out of the Devils". Video Watchdog. No. 35. ISSN 1070-9991.
- Reed, Oliver (1979). Reed All About Me. London, England: Hodder and Stoughton. ISBN 978-0-491-02039-8.
- Robertson, James Crighton (1993). The Hidden Cinema: British Film Censorship in Action, 1913–1975. New York City, New York: Routledge. ISBN 978-0-415-09034-6.
