= Jean Salmon Macrin =

Neo-Latin poet

Jean Salmon Macrin (1490 – 1557) was a Neo-Latin poet of French nationality. His poetry sold massively well, and was thought of as quite influential during his lifetime; however his fame did not live on, and his poetry was never republished after the 16th century.

== Life and works ==
Salmon Macrin was born in Loudun in 1490, and retained an intimate attachment to the countryside of his youth throughout his life. Patriotism and nostalgia for his 'patria' feature as prominent themes in his poetry. His father supported him in his poetic vocation, and in his teens he was sent to Paris to study under Jacques Lefèvre d'Etaples. There he mastered Greek and Latin, and honed his poetic art alongside Quintianus Stoa. When his studies ended, he became secretary to Antoine Bohier, and later entered Court life as tutor to the sons of René de Savoie. After the death of the latter, Salmon Macrin remained in the service of his son Honorat. The poet found that Court life was not well-suited to his temperament, and he composed little during this period. It was his marriage to Guillone Boursault ('Gelonis') that reignited his passion for poetry, and his two most famous works (the 'Epithalamiorum liber' of 1528–1531 and the 'Carminum libri quattuor' of 1530) contained many poems dedicated to her. Salmon Macrin's poetry met with great success in his later years, and he enjoyed the favour of the king, Francis I.

Salmon Macrin boasted of having been the first to introduce Catullus and Horace into French poetry. His principal Neo-Latin models were the Italians Pontano, Marullus, Poliziano and Sannazaro. He was widely known as the French Horace, and his works had a great influence on vernacular poetry, especially the Pléiade.

Du Bellay, in his 'Amores Faustinae', mentions Macrin in his list of great contemporary love poets, alongside Pontano, Sannazaro, Marullus, Petrarch, Bèze, Tyard and Baïf.
