= The Devils of Loudun =

1952 novel by Aldous Huxley

- First edition
- Author: Aldous Huxley
- Cover artist: Val Biro
- Language: English
- Subject: History, biography
- Published: 1952 (Chatto & Windus)
- Publication place: United Kingdom
- Media type: Print (hardback & paperback)

The Devils of Loudun is a 1952 non-fiction account expressed in a novelistic style by English writer and philosopher Aldous Huxley. It recounts the events of the Loudun possessions of 1634, in which a convent of Ursuline nuns in Loudun, Kingdom of France, accused priest Urbain Grandier of witchcraft, leading to an investigation by the Catholic Church supported by Cardinal Richelieu; an advisor to King Louis XIII, Richelieu sought to consolidate royal power in France and demolish Loudun's town walls, and Grandier was a vocal opponent to Richelieu's policies.

The Devils of Loudun was adapted into a 1961 play titled The Devils, written by John Whiting, which was itself adapted into an opera by composer Krzysztof Penderecki. Both Huxley's novel and Whiting's play inspired the 1971 film The Devils, written and directed by Ken Russell.

== Premise ==
It is a historical narrative of supposed demonic possession, religious fanaticism, sexual repression, and mass hysteria that occurred in 17th-century France surrounding unexplained events that took place in the small town of Loudun. It centres on Roman Catholic priest Urbain Grandier and an entire convent of Ursuline nuns, who allegedly became possessed by demons after Grandier made a pact with Satan. The events led to several public exorcisms as well as executions by burning.

== Historical details ==
Urbain Grandier was a priest burned at the stake at Loudun, France on 18 August 1634. He was accused of seducing an entire convent of Ursuline nuns and of being in league with the devil. Grandier was likely promiscuous and was insolent towards his peers. He had antagonised the Mother Superior, Sister Jeanne of the Angels, when he rejected her offer to become the spiritual advisor to the convent. He faced an ecclesiastical tribunal and was acquitted.

It was only after he had publicly spoken against Cardinal Richelieu that a new trial was ordered by the Cardinal. He was tortured, found guilty and executed by being burnt alive, but never admitted guilt. Huxley touches on aspects of the multiple personality controversy in cases of apparent demonic possession within this book.

== Reception ==
Though less well known than some of Huxley's other books, The Devils of Loudun is considered one of his best works. Washington Post Book World called it "Huxley's masterpiece" and The New York Times called it the "peak achievement of Huxley's career."

Celestine Sibley of The Atlanta Journal wrote: "The Devils of Loudun is what is known as a historical narrative, which apparently means that it has iron ribs of well-documented fact, replete with bibliography, fleshed out by Mr. Huxley's razor-sharp characterizations, interpretations and philosophy. You emerge with a feeling that you have read a horror story that was good for you because it was accompanied by a sermon." The San Francisco Chronicle's Joseph Henry Jackson called The Devils of Loudun "a marvelously well done study of a similar sort" to The Devil in Massachusetts: A Modern Enquiry into the Salem Witch Trials, a non-fiction book by Marion L. Starkey, and commended Huxley for his combination of storytelling; providing context of the philosophical and political climate of France and Europe more broadly at the time; and conclusions about the dangers of mob mentality. Fanny Butcher, reviewing The Devils of Loudun for the Chicago Tribune, called it "a book which demands intense concentration in the reading. But that demand repays richly the adult reader who prefers a prodding to a lulling of his mental processes, and who is a seeker after the esoteric."

== Adaptations ==
- The Devils (1960), play written by John Whiting
- The Devils of Loudun (1969), opera written by Krzysztof Penderecki
- Die Teufel von Loudun (1969), television film directed by Rolf Liebermann
- The Devils (1971), film written and directed by Ken Russell

== See also ==
- Dreams of Roses and Fire — a 1949 novel by Eyvind Johnson based on the same events.
- Mother Joan of the Angels — a 1961 Polish film
