= Loudun =

- Commune
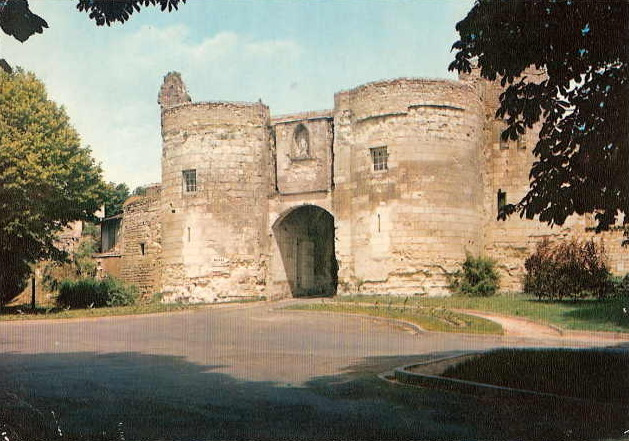
- Porte du Martray in Loudun

- Coat of arms
- Location of Loudun
- Location within France Location within Nouvelle-Aquitaine
- Coordinates: 47°00′38″N 0°05′04″E
- Country: France
- Region: Nouvelle-Aquitaine
- Department: Vienne
- Arrondissement: Châtellerault
- Canton: Loudun
- Intercommunality: Pays Loudunais

Government
  - Mayor (2020–2026): Joël Dazas
- Area^{1}: 43.77 km^{2} (16.90 sq mi)
- Elevation: 90 m (300 ft)
- Highest elevation: 120 m (390 ft)
- Lowest elevation: 47 m (154 ft)
- Population (2023): 6,839
  - Density: 156.2/km^{2} (404.7/sq mi)
- Time zone: UTC+01:00 (CET)
  - Summer (DST): UTC+02:00 (CEST)
- INSEE/Postal code: 86137 /86200
- Website: www.ville-loudun.fr
- ^{1} French Land Register data, which excludes lakes, ponds, glaciers > 1 km^{2} (0.386 sq mi or 247 acres) and river estuaries.

Loudun (/luːˈdʌn/; French pronunciation: [lu.dœ̃]; Poitevin: Loudin) is a commune in the Vienne department and the region of Nouvelle-Aquitaine, western France.

It is located 30 km (19 mi) south of the town of Chinon and 25 km to the east of the town Thouars. The area south of Loudun is the place of origin of a significant portion of the Acadians, one of the early settlers of New France in Canada.

== Demographics ==
Historical population
Year	Pop.	±% p.a.
1968	7,094	—
1975	8,035	+1.80%
1982	8,120	+0.15%
1990	7,854	−0.42%
1999	7,704	−0.21%
2007	7,173	−0.89%
2012	6,819	−1.01%
2017	6,747	−0.21%
2023	6,839	+0.23%
Source: INSEE

== Sights ==
Loudun, an ancient town, contains numerous old streets, buildings and monuments of which five are Government-listed monuments. It is also the location of a vicus type archaeological site.

== History ==
- The Treaty of Loudun, negotiated and signed in Loudun on May 3, 1616, temporarily resolved the power struggle for control of the French government between the Prince of Condé (next in line for Louis XIII's throne) and queen mother Marie de Medici's favorite Concino Concini, Marquis of Ancre.
- Loudun was also the site of mass hysteria surrounding the supposed mass possession of Ursuline nuns by the Devil in 1634 (see Loudun possessions).

== Loudun in art ==
- Jarosław Iwaszkiewicz's 1942 (published in 1946) short story which transposes the story to Poland
- Eyvind Johnson's 1949 novel Drömmar om rosor och eld was based on the Loudun possessions.
- Aldous Huxley's 1952 non-fiction novel The Devils of Loudun was also based on the Loudun possessions.
- John Whiting's 1961 theatre play The Devils, commissioned by Sir Peter Hall for the Royal Shakespeare Company, was based on Aldous Huxley's novel.
- A Polish film, Mother Joan of the Angels (1961), is based on Jarosław Iwaszkiewicz short story.
- Krzysztof Penderecki's 1969 opera The Devils of Loudun (Die Teufel von Loudun), which premiered at the Hamburg State Opera, was based on Huxley's novel and Whiting's play.
- Ken Russell's 1971 film The Devils was based on Huxley's novel and Whiting's play.

== Notable people ==
Loudun is the birthplace of:

- Jean Salmon Macrin (1490–1557), Neo-Latin poet
- Théophraste Renaudot (1586–1653), medical practitioner, inventor of the French written press, journalist, and philanthropist
- Ismaël Bullialdus (1604–1694), astronomer
- Jean-Charles Cornay, martyr.
- Marie Besnard, accused of poisoning in the 1950s in what was a very mediatized trial; her story was the subject of a successful TV movie and several books
- René Monory, mayor of Loudun, senator of Vienne, president of the French Senate, Minister of Education, president of the Vienne General Council, and founder of the Futuroscope Park of Poitiers
- Nicolas Ghesquière (born 1972), creative director of the French fashion house Balenciaga was born in 1972 in Comines, Nord-Pas-de-Calais but was always raised in Loudun where his parents own a golf course.

Loudun is the place of death of:

- Urbain Grandier (18 August 1634), French Catholic priest who was burned at the stake after being convicted of witchcraft.
- André Andrejew (16 March 1967), French-Russian classic film production designer, built decor for movies produced in Germany, France, England and the US.

== Twin towns ==
- Ouagadougou, Burkina Faso
- Audun le Tiche, France
- Shippagan, Canada
- Leuze, Belgium
- Burgos, Spain
- Thibodaux, USA

== Climate ==
Climate data for Loudun (1991–2020 averages)
Month	Jan	Feb	Mar	Apr	May	Jun	Jul	Aug	Sep	Oct	Nov	Dec	Year
Record high °C (°F)	16.6 (61.9)	22.5 (72.5)	24.5 (76.1)	29.4 (84.9)	32.2 (90.0)	41.1 (106.0)	40.8 (105.4)	40.2 (104.4)	35.3 (95.5)	30.9 (87.6)	22.7 (72.9)	18.0 (64.4)	41.1 (106.0)
Mean daily maximum °C (°F)	8.3 (46.9)	9.6 (49.3)	13.3 (55.9)	16.3 (61.3)	20.0 (68.0)	23.7 (74.7)	26.0 (78.8)	26.1 (79.0)	22.3 (72.1)	17.3 (63.1)	11.9 (53.4)	8.7 (47.7)	17.0 (62.6)
Daily mean °C (°F)	5.5 (41.9)	6.0 (42.8)	8.8 (47.8)	11.1 (52.0)	14.7 (58.5)	18.1 (64.6)	20.1 (68.2)	20.2 (68.4)	16.9 (62.4)	13.2 (55.8)	8.6 (47.5)	5.8 (42.4)	12.4 (54.3)
Mean daily minimum °C (°F)	2.7 (36.9)	2.3 (36.1)	4.2 (39.6)	5.9 (42.6)	9.3 (48.7)	12.5 (54.5)	14.2 (57.6)	14.2 (57.6)	11.4 (52.5)	9.1 (48.4)	5.4 (41.7)	3.0 (37.4)	7.9 (46.2)
Record low °C (°F)	−14.0 (6.8)	−14.3 (6.3)	−9.6 (14.7)	−3.3 (26.1)	0.2 (32.4)	3.5 (38.3)	7.1 (44.8)	6.8 (44.2)	2.7 (36.9)	−3.7 (25.3)	−8.0 (17.6)	−10.5 (13.1)	−14.3 (6.3)
Average precipitation mm (inches)	56.4 (2.22)	46.6 (1.83)	44.9 (1.77)	50.3 (1.98)	53.9 (2.12)	48.5 (1.91)	45.1 (1.78)	44.8 (1.76)	46.7 (1.84)	63.7 (2.51)	66.5 (2.62)	64.1 (2.52)	631.5 (24.86)
Average precipitation days (≥ 1.0 mm)	10.1	9.2	8.7	9.5	8.8	7.6	6.5	6.4	7.3	9.4	11.2	11.3	106.0
Mean monthly sunshine hours	69.9	105.3	156.1	197.5	228.8	247.2	260.0	237.4	206.1	130.2	86.8	77.6	2,002.7
Source: Meteociel

== See also ==
- Lugus
- Communes of the Vienne department
