= Bouère =

- Commune
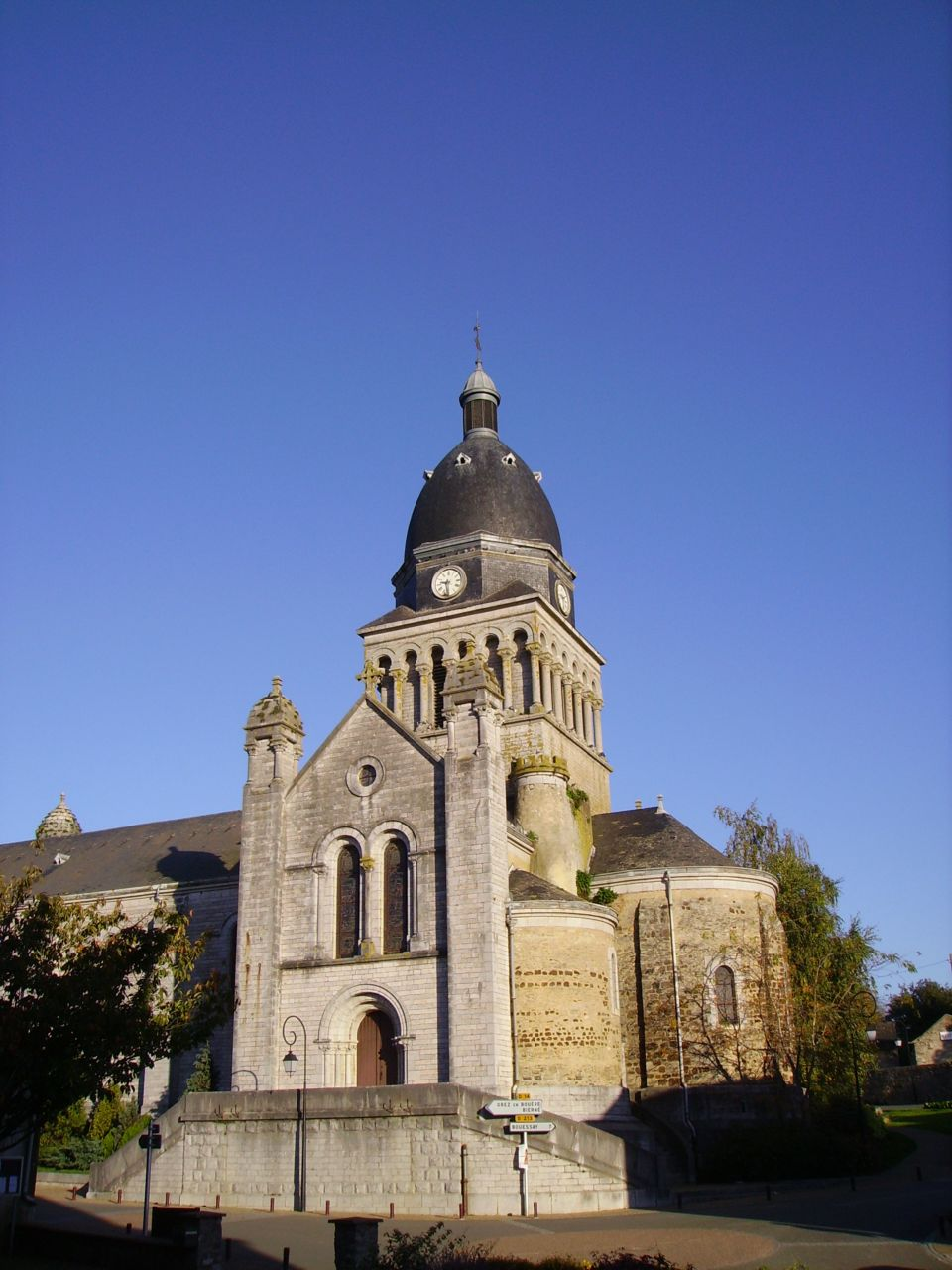
- The church in Bouère
- Location of Bouère
- Location within France Location within Pays de la Loire
- Coordinates: 47°51′50″N 0°28′38″W
- Country: France
- Region: Pays de la Loire
- Department: Mayenne
- Arrondissement: Château-Gontier
- Canton: Meslay-du-Maine

Government
  - Mayor (2020–2026): Jacky Chauveau
- Area^{1}: 42.54 km^{2} (16.42 sq mi)
- Elevation: 81 m (266 ft)
- Highest elevation: 117 m (384 ft)
- Lowest elevation: 41 m (135 ft)
- Population (2023): 1,058
  - Density: 24.87/km^{2} (64.41/sq mi)
- Time zone: UTC+01:00 (CET)
  - Summer (DST): UTC+02:00 (CEST)
- INSEE/Postal code: 53036 /53290
- ^{1} French Land Register data, which excludes lakes, ponds, glaciers > 1 km^{2} (0.386 sq mi or 247 acres) and river estuaries.

Bouère (French pronunciation: [bwɛʁ]) is a commune in the Mayenne department in northwestern France.

== Geography ==
Situated 35 km (22 mi) from Laval, 54 km (34 mi) from Angers, and 70 km (43 mi) from Le Mans in the southeast of today's Mayenne department, Bouère historically lay within the territories of Angevin Mayenne, which formed part of Anjou.

Local quarries supplied a proportion of the marble used in the construction of the Basilica of the Sacré Cœur and Saint-Lazare railway station in Paris.

== Administration ==
List of successive mayors

Beginning	End	Name
2008	2026	Jacky Chauveau
1978	2008	Claude Bucher
1906		Chemin
1896		Beauplet
1880	1896	Foucher
1870	1880	Bachlier
1855	1870	Sesboué
1850		Godivier
1840		Sesboué
1836		Tonnelier
1830	1836	Chamaret
1827	1830	Oger
1821	1824	Louis Joachim du Bois Jourdan
1801	1804	Tonnelier
1800		Jamin
1791	1795	René Sesboué

== Population ==
Historical population
Year	Pop.	±% p.a.
1968	1,149	—
1975	1,030	−1.55%
1982	911	−1.74%
1990	857	−0.76%
1999	907	+0.63%
2007	962	+0.74%
2012	1,067	+2.09%
2017	1,090	+0.43%
2023	1,058	−0.50%
Source: INSEE

== Sights ==
- Romanesque church (11th/12th century restored in the 19th century)
- Communal cemetery (registered with the additional inventory of the historic buildings)
- Votive vault 1871
- Castle of Bois-Jourdan 16th/17th century and dependences
- Castle of the Vézousière 18th century
- Castle of Rochers 19th century
- Castle of the Sevaudière 19th century
- Castle of Daviers 19th century

== Personalities ==
- Urbain Grandier

== See also ==
- Communes of Mayenne
