= The Devils (play) =

Play written by John Whiting

- Original language: English
- Written by: John Whiting
- Characters: Urbain Grandier; Sister Jeanne of the Angels; Philippe Trincant; Adam; Mannoury; Father Mignon; Baron de Laubardemont; Father Pierre Barre; Cardinal Richelieu
- Genre: Drama
- Setting: Loudun and Paris, France, 1634

Premiere
- Date: 1961
- Place: Aldwych Theatre

The Devils is a play, commissioned by Sir Peter Hall for the Royal Shakespeare Company and written by British dramatist John Whiting, based on Aldous Huxley's 1952 book, The Devils of Loudun.

== Performance ==
The Devils had its first performance at London's Aldwych Theatre in February, 1961, with Dorothy Tutin portraying the deformed and hysterical Sister Jeanne of the Angels, and Richard Johnson as the existential hero, Father Urbain Grandier. Diana Rigg appeared in the supporting role of Philippe and Max Adrian played the zealot exorcist, Father Pierre Barre (Max Adrian himself would go on to appear in the film version of the play, albeit not as Pierre Barre, but as Ibert, the surgeon).

Whiting revised his text in 1963, shortly before his death from cancer. The play was subsequently produced at the Arena Stage in Washington, D.C. under the direction of Zelda Fichandler, and on Broadway in 1965, with Anne Bancroft and Jason Robards in the leading roles. The Broadway version was produced by Alexander H. Cohen and directed by Michael Cacoyannis, running for 63 performances. The Broadway version was forced to close because Bancroft was injured and because of the 1966 New York City transit strike.

In 1967, the Mark Taper Forum in Los Angeles presented The Devils as its inaugural production, directed by Gordon Davidson and starring Frank Langella in the role of Grandier. The play was performed by the Melbourne Theatre Company as part of its repertory season. It starred Fred Parslow and Joanna McCallum. In 2018, the play was performed at the Royal Central School of Speech and Drama, directed by Ben Naylor and Anna Healey.

== The story ==
The play's action takes place primarily in Loudun, France in 1634 and revolves around a secular priest Urbain Grandier, whose adamant public opposition to Cardinal Richelieu's ongoing centralization of the French government makes him a hot political target. The hysterical Sister Jeanne, Mother Superior of the Convent of St Ursula, falls in lust with Urbain Grandier, and subsequently accuses him of bewitching her. When these charges of witchcraft are brought against the priest, both church and state move swiftly to destroy him. The investigation, subsequent trial and eventual execution quickly take on a ludicrous carnival-like atmosphere with crazed nuns (including Sister Jeanne herself), dubious medical procedures, ecclesiastical torture and outrageous public exorcisms, all depicted with considerable onstage realism.

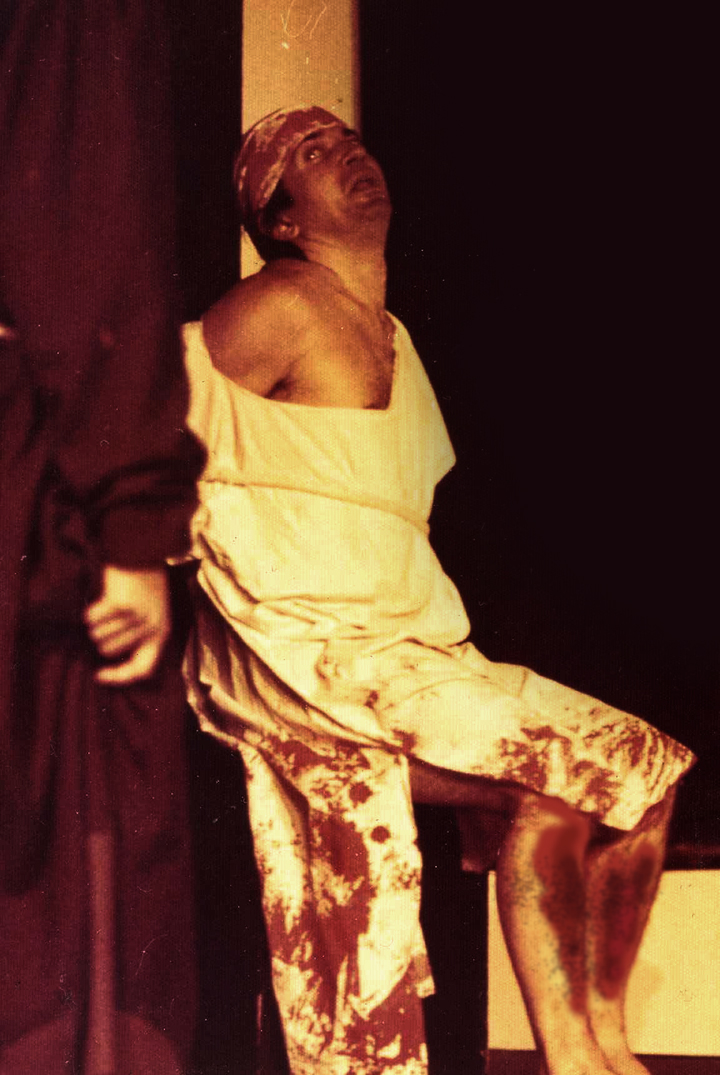
David Keltz in scene from The Devils, by John Whiting, at the Corner Theatre ETC in 1976.

== Text and adaptation ==
Readers of both Huxley's book and Whiting's play will note several alterations made for the stage. First, the addition of a Chorus-like character, the Sewerman, who not only provides ironic commentary but assists in the narrative action of the highly episodic play itself. Secondly, the role of Philippe is a composite character, fashioned from two historical figures in Huxley's text: Madeline de Brou and Philippe Trincant, the young and vulnerable daughter of Loudun's Magistrate.

Whiting's The Devils also provided ample text, following some adaptation, for Krzysztof Penderecki's opera, The Devils of Loudun (Die Teufel von Loudun). It was also heavily used by British film director Ken Russell in the preparation for the screenplay of his highly controversial film version, The Devils (1971).

== See also ==
- Loudun possessions

== Related books and articles ==
- Ken Russell: The Adaptor as Creator by Joseph A. Gomez, Published by Muller in 1976.(ISBN 0584102038 / 0-584-10203-8) This text provides a wealth of information about Whiting's adaptation of Huxley's historical novel.
