= Urbain Grandier =

French Catholic priest convicted of witchcraft and burned at the stake in 1634

The Reverend Urbain Grandier
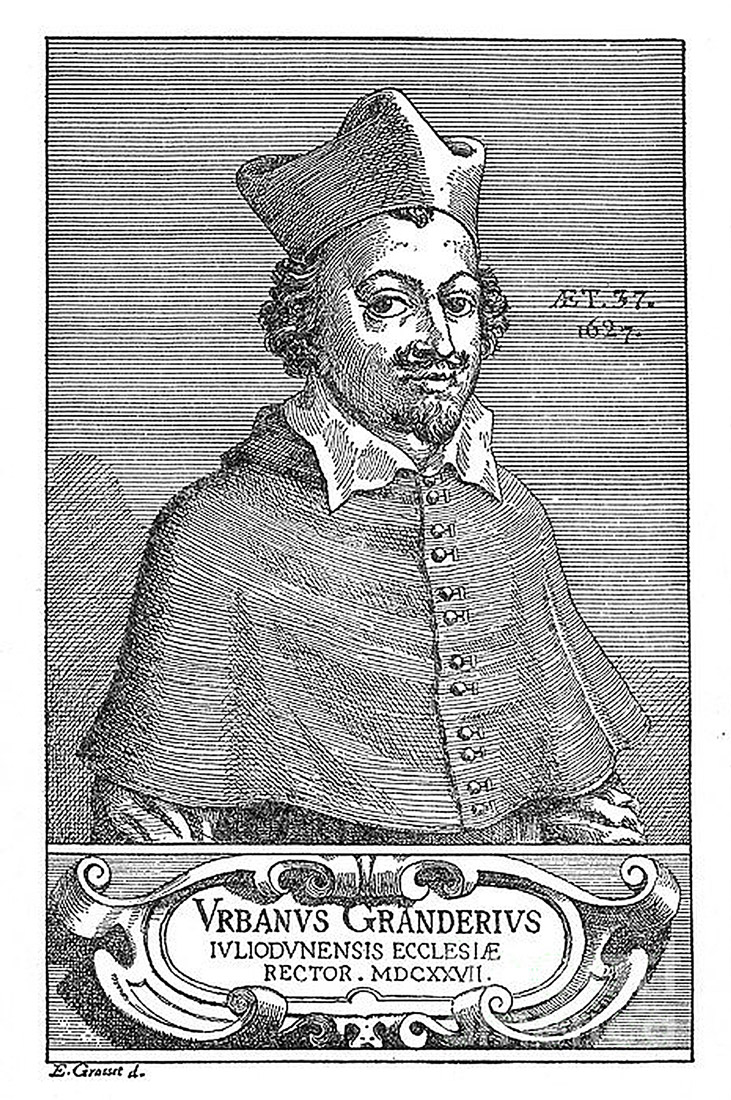
- Grandier in 1627
- Born: 1590; Bouère, Maine, Kingdom of France
- Died: 18 August 1634 (aged 43–44); Loudun, Kingdom of France
- Cause of death: Execution by burning
- Occupation: Priest
- Criminal charge: Witchcraft

Urbain Grandier (born around 1590 in Bouère – 18 August 1634 in Loudun) was a French Catholic priest who was burned at the stake after being convicted of witchcraft, following the events of the so-called "Loudun possessions". Some modern commentators, notably Aldous Huxley in his historical account The Devils of Loudun, have concluded that Grandier was the victim of a politically motivated persecution led by the powerful Cardinal Richelieu.

The circumstances of Father Grandier's trial and execution have attracted the attention of writers Alexandre Dumas père, Eyvind Johnson, and Aldous Huxley, the playwright John Whiting, filmmaker Ken Russell, composers such as Krzysztof Penderecki and Peter Maxwell Davies, as well as historian Jules Michelet and various scholars of European witchcraft.

== Life ==
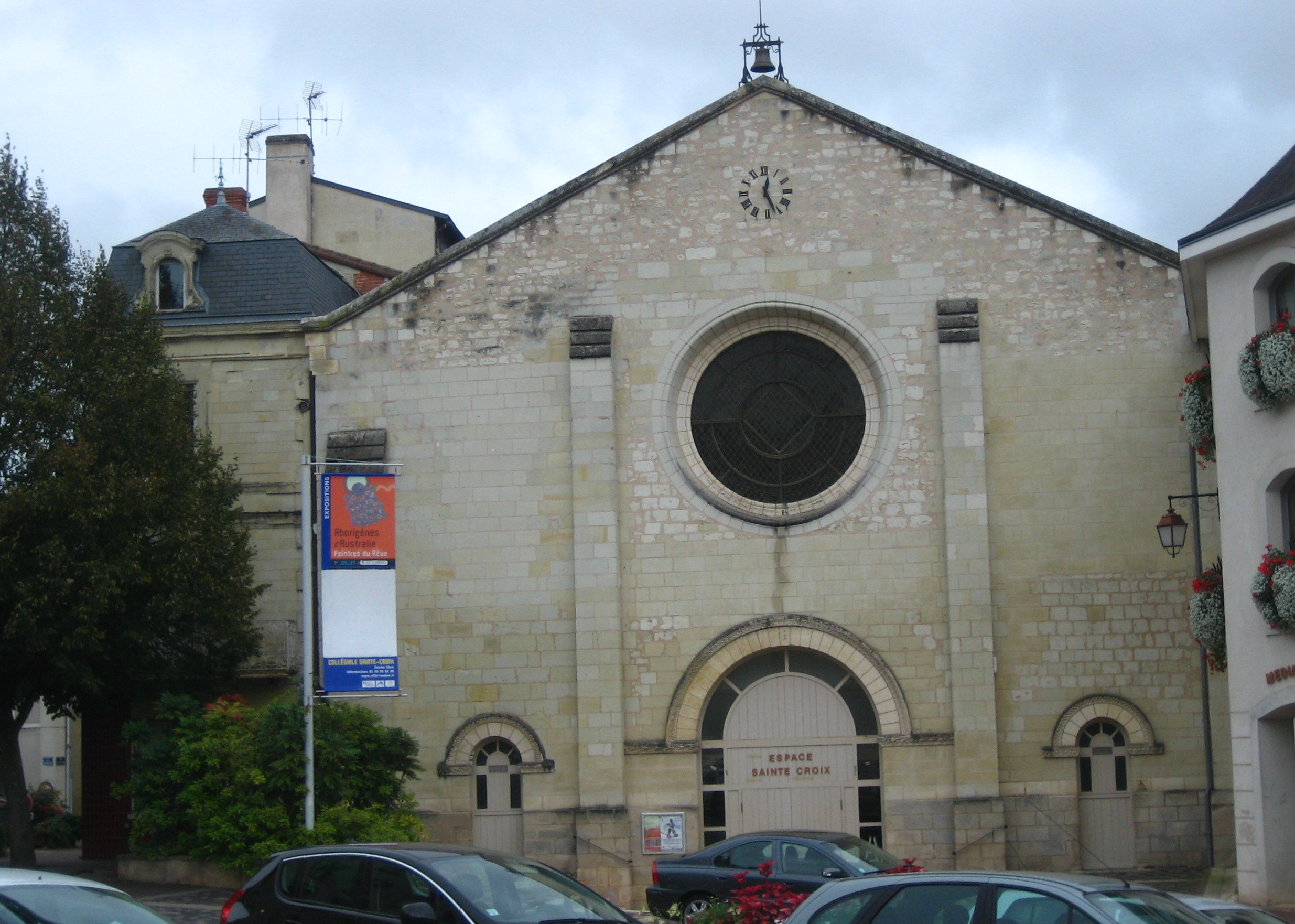
Église Sainte-Croix de Loudun

Grandier was the son of Pierre Grandier. His uncle was Claude Grandier, a priest who held some influence with the Jesuits there. Grandier attended the Jesuit college of La Madeleine in Bordeaux. They held the right to appoint the parish priest for the Church of Saint-Pierre-du-Marche in Loudun, and in 1617 chose Grandier. They also had the right to name a canon to the collegiate Church of Sainte Croix, also in Loudun, and Grandier was appointed to that as well. Thus, as the eldest son, he was able to support his widowed mother and siblings. That he should receive both valuable positions over a local candidate caused some resentment. Both benefices were in the Diocese of Poitiers.

Sometime around 1629 or 1630, Philippa Trincant, daughter of Louis Trincant, the king's prosecutor and a friend of Grandier, gave birth to a son. It was widely suspected that Grandier was the father. He was also believed to have had intimate relations with a number of women.

== Allegations of sorcery ==
In 1632, a group of nuns from the local Ursuline convent accused him of having bewitched them, sending the demon Asmodai, among others, to commit evil and impudent acts with them. Aldous Huxley, in his non-fiction book, The Devils of Loudun, argued that the accusations began after Grandier refused to become spiritual director of the convent, unaware that the Mother Superior, Jeanne des Anges, had become obsessed with him after having seen him from afar and heard of his sexual exploits. According to Huxley, Mother Jeanne, enraged by his rejection, instead invited Canon Jean Mignon, an enemy of Grandier, to become the director. Jeanne then accused Grandier of using black magic to seduce her. The other nuns gradually began to make similar accusations. However, Monsieur des Niau, Counsellor at la Flèche, said that Grandier applied for the position, but that it was instead awarded to Canon Jean Mignon, a nephew of Monsieur Trincant.

The Archbishop of Bordeaux intervened and ordered the nuns sequestered, upon which the instances of possession seemed to have stopped.

== Richelieu ==
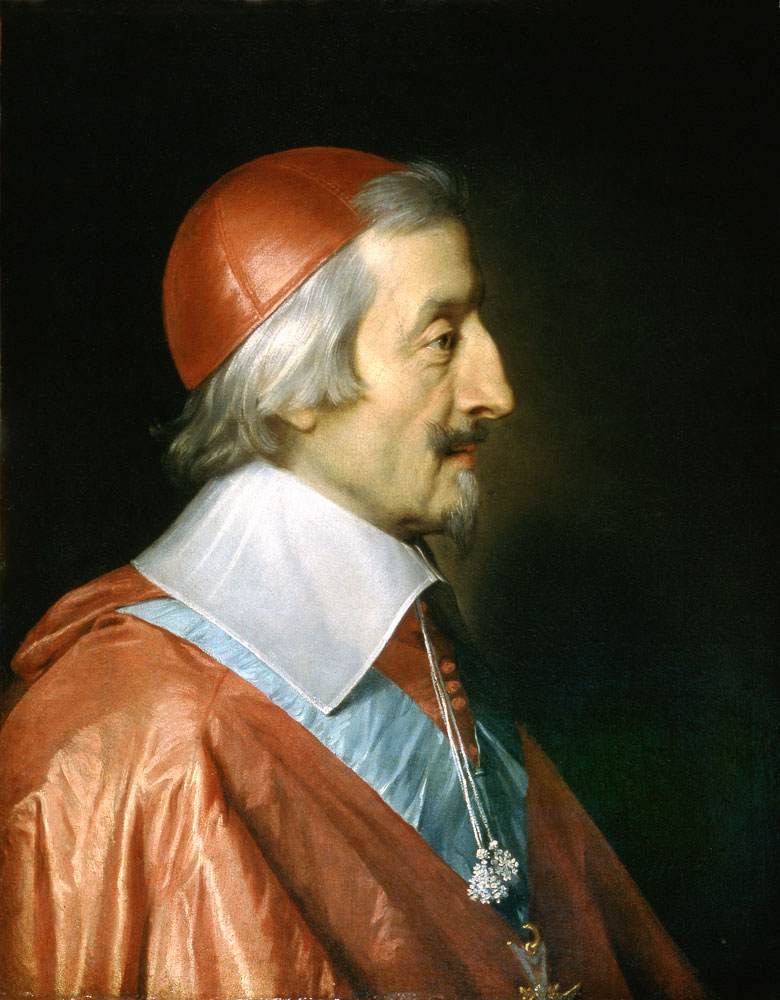
Cardinal de Richelieu by Philippe de Champaigne (1642)

Grandier had gained the enmity of the powerful Cardinal Richelieu, the chief minister of France. In its continuing efforts to consolidate and centralize power, the Crown had ordered the walls around Loudun to be demolished. The populace were of two minds concerning this, whether to keep the wall or rely on the central government for protection. Grandier supported those who wished to retain the walls. In addition, not only had Grandier written a book attacking the discipline of clerical celibacy, he had also penned a scathing satire on the cardinal.

Around the time of the nuns' accusations, M. Jean de Laubardemont, a relative of the Mother Superior of the convent of Loudun, was sent to demolish the town tower. He was prevented from doing so by the town militia, and upon returning to Paris reported on the state of affairs in Loudun including the recent disturbance at the Ursuline convent. In November 1633, Laubardemont was commissioned to investigate the matter. Grandier was arrested and confined to the prison at Angers. Laubardemont returned to Paris, where letters in support of Grandier from the Bailly of Loudun to the Procurator-General of the Parliament, stating that the possession was an "imposture", were intercepted.

== Trial ==
Laubardemont returned to Loudun with a Decree of the Council, dated 31 May 1634, confirming all his powers and prohibiting Parlement and all other judges from interfering in the matter, and forbidding all parties concerned from appealing, under penalty of a fine of five hundred livres. Grandier, who had been held at the prison of Angers, was returned to Loudun. Both the examination of witnesses and the exorcisms of the Ursulines continued. After Grandier had been tortured, documents were introduced purportedly signed by him and several demons as evidence that he had made a diabolical pact. It is not clear whether Grandier wrote or signed the pacts under duress, or whether they were forged.

Grandier was found guilty and sentenced to death. The judges who condemned Grandier ordered that he be put to the "extraordinary question", a form of torture which was usually, but not immediately, fatal, and was therefore administered to only those victims who were to be executed soon afterwards. In addition, Grandier was subjected to a form of the Spanish boot, an iron vise filled with spikes, that was brought to red heat and then applied to the calves and ankles to shatter the bones. Despite torture, Grandier never confessed to witchcraft. He was burned alive at the stake.

Many theories exist as to the cause of the Loudun "possessions". One of the most likely explanations is that the whole affair was orchestrated by Richelieu. Huxley in his book The Devils of Loudun (1952) and in the Ken Russell film version of the Huxley book (1971) alleged that the initial accusations against Grandier by the nuns of the convent of Loudun were part of a case of collective hysteria.

Augustin Calmet, among others, compared this case to the pretended possession of Martha Broissier (1578), which received a great deal of circulation at the time. This criticism was in part due to the fact that the circumstances revolving the incidents and the examinations of possession in question show more indications of pretended possessions than that of more dominantly legitimate cases, such as the possession of Mademoiselle Elizabeth de Ranfaing (1621). In his Treatise, it is stated that the causes of the injustice committed at Loudun were a mixture of political ambition, the need for attention, and a basic desire to dispose of political opponents. The Loudun affair took place in the reign of Louis XIII; Cardinal Richelieu is accused of having caused this tragedy, in order to ruin Grandier, the Curé of Loudun, for having written a cutting satire against him.

== Diabolical pact ==
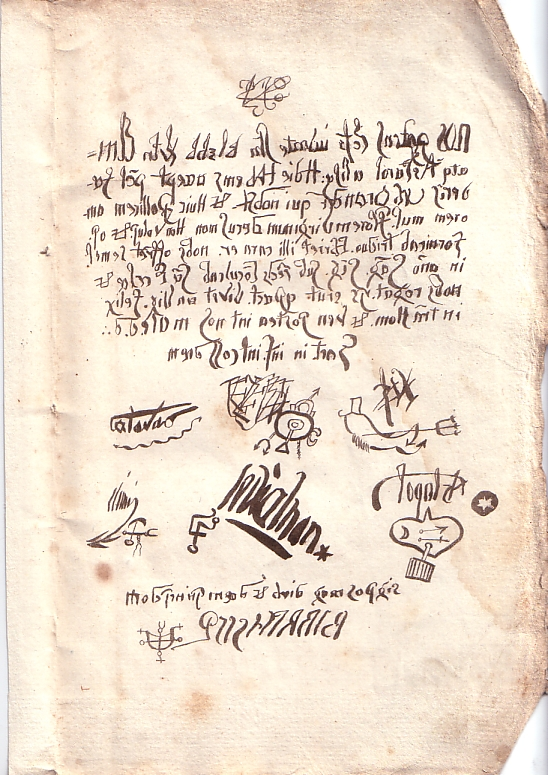
Pact in Backwards Latin

One of the documents introduced as evidence during Grandier's second trial is a diabolical pact written in Latin and apparently signed by Grandier. Another, which looks illegible, is written backwards, in Latin with scribal abbreviation, and has since been published and translated in a number of books on witchcraft. This document also carries many strange symbols, and was signed by several demons including Satan himself. Deciphered and translated to English, it reads:

We, the influential Lucifer, the young Satan, Beelzebub, Leviathan, Elimi,
and Astaroth, together with others, have today accepted the covenant pact
of Urbain Grandier, who is ours. And him do we promise
the love of women, the flower of virgins, the respect of monarchs, honours, lusts and powers.
He will go whoring three days long; the carousal will be dear to him. He offers us once
in the year a seal of blood, under the feet, he will trample the holy things of the church and
he will ask us many questions; with this pact, he will live twenty years happy
on the earth of men, and will later join us to sin against God.
Bound in Hell, in the council of demons.
Lucifer Beelzebub Satan
Astaroth Leviathan Elimi
The seals placed the Devil, the master, and the demons, princes of the lord.
Baalberith, writer.

== Artistic depictions ==
An 18th-century book written by historian Nicholas Aubin contains his findings on the Devils of Loudun. The book is titled, "The Cheats and Illusions of Romish Priests and Exorcists Discovered in the History of the Devils of Loudun."

Grandier's trials were the subject of two treatments by Alexandre Dumas, père: an entry in volume four of his Crimes Célèbres (1840) and a novel, Urbain Grandier (1850).

The French historian Jules Michelet discussed Grandier in a chapter of La Sorcière (1862).

The Swedish author Eyvind Johnson based his 1949 novel Drömmar om rosor och eld on Grandier and the Loudun possessions.

The same subject was revisited in the book-length essay The Devils of Loudun, by Aldous Huxley, published in 1952. Huxley's book was adapted for the stage in 1961 by John Whiting (commissioned by the Royal Shakespeare Company). The play was adapted for the movie screen by Ken Russell in 1971 (as The Devils). The novel was also adapted for the opera stage in 1969 by Krzysztof Penderecki (as Die Teufel von Loudun). It was also an inspiration for Matka Joanna od Aniołów (Mother Joan of the Angels) – a film by Jerzy Kawalerowicz after the story ("Matka od Aniołów|Mother Joan of the Angels") by Jarosław Iwaszkiewicz.

Grandier is the subject of "Grandier's Funeral Pyre", a song by Elvenking on the album The Pagan Manifesto (2014).

Grandier is also the subject of the song "Devils" by the pagan rock band Inkubus Sukkubus from their 1993 album Wytches.

Florida death metal band Morbid Angel used Grandier's life as one of the main themes for their album Covenant.

The Loudun possessions and Grandier's trial are the subject of Les brasiers ne s'éteignent jamais ("The Braziers Never Go Out") by Michel Gaudo, an adventure module for the French horror RPG Malefices. Learning about the historical case helps the investigators solve the mystery.

Grandier is portrayed by Oliver Reed in the 1971 Ken Russell film The Devils.

== See also ==
- List of people executed for witchcraft

== Sources ==
- Huxley, Aldous (1953). The Devils of Loudun.
- Robbins, Rossell Hope (1959). The Encyclopedia of Witchcraft and Demonology. New York: Crown Publishers, Inc. (see article on Urbain Grandier)
