= Mother Joan of the Angels =

- DVD cover
- Directed by: Jerzy Kawalerowicz
- Written by: Jerzy Kawalerowicz; Tadeusz Konwicki
- Starring: Lucyna Winnicka; Mieczyslaw Voit
- Cinematography: Jerzy Wójcik
- Edited by: Wiesława Otocka
- Music by: Adam Walaciński
- Production company: Studio Filmowe Kadr
- Release dates: May 1961 (Cannes); 9 February 1961
- Running time: 105 minutes
- Country: Poland
- Languages: Polish; Latin

Mother Joan of the Angels (Polish: Matka Joanna od Aniołów, also known as The Devil and the Nun) is a 1961 Polish religious horror art film on demonic possession, directed by Jerzy Kawalerowicz, based on a novella of the same title by Jarosław Iwaszkiewicz, loosely based on the 17th century Loudun possessions. The film won the Special Jury Prize at the 1961 Cannes Film Festival.

== Plot ==
The story takes place in and around a seventeenth century convent in Smolensk. A priest, Father Józef Suryn, arrives at a small inn for a night's rest. He has been sent to investigate a case of demonic possession at the nearby convent after the local priest, Father Garniec, was burnt at the stake for sexually tempting the nuns. The next day, Father Suryn sets out for the convent, where he meets the abbess, Mother Joan, said to be the most possessed of all the nuns. Already four priests before Father Suryn have tried to exorcise Mother Joan, but without success. The villagers at the inn are curious about the convent's troubled past and do everything to keep track of its developing story, with the stableman, Kaziuk, leading Father Suryn around and asking the only non-possessed nun Sister Małgorzata for stories when she makes her nightly visits to the inn.

After Father Suryn learns that Mother Joan is possessed by eight demons, he and several other priests, during an exorcism, manage to exorcise the abbess. She and the other nuns appear cured. Soon after, however, the demonic possession increases. Mother Joan tries to seduce Father Suryn, begging him to make her a saint. In the meantime Sister Małgorzata leaves the convent and becomes Margareth after falling in love with Chrząszczewski, a squire who visits the inn.

After a failed meeting takes place between Father Suryn and the local rabbi, the priest re-enters the convent and receives Mother Joan's demons through his love for her. At night, reasoning that the only way to save the abbess is by doing Satan's bidding, Father Suryn grabs an axe and kills Kaziuk and Juraj, another stableman. The next morning, Margareth is abandoned by the squire, and finds Father Suryn holding the bloodied axe. The priest instructs her to go to Mother Joan and tell her of the sacrifice he made for her salvation in the name of love. Margareth runs back to the convent and cries with Mother Joan, neither saying a word.

== Cast ==
- Lucyna Winnicka as Mother Joan of the Angels
- Mieczysław Voit as Father Józef Suryn/Rabbi
- Anna Ciepielewska as Sister Małgorzata
- Maria Chwalibóg as Antosia
- Kazimierz Fabisiak as Father Brym
- Stanisław Jasiukiewicz as Chrząszczewski
- Zygmunt Zintel as Wincenty Wołodkowicz
- Jerzy Kaczmarek as Kaziuk
- Franciszek Pieczka as Odryn
- Jarosław Kuszewski as Juraj
- Lech Wojciechowski as Piatkowski
- Marian Nosek as Dominican Priest
- Jerzy Walden as Dominican Priest
- Marian Nowak
- Zygmunt Malawski as Exorcist

== Background ==
Mother Joan of the Angels is very loosely based on the real-life outbreak of mass hysteria that occurred in the French town of Loudun in 1634 when a convent of Ursuline nuns, led by the hunchbacked Sister Jeanne of the Angels, became obsessed with a handsome, womanising priest, Urbain Grandier. After Grandier turned down the nun's invitation to become their spiritual director, Jeanne accused Grandier of using black magic to seduce her and her sisters and possess them with devils. Grandier's enemies, including Cardinal Richelieu, used the accusation as an excuse to have the priest found guilty of witchcraft and executed.

Unlike Ken Russell's more famous film The Devils (1971) – which depicts Grandier's trial and climaxes with his execution – Mother Joan of the Angels depicts the events that occurred subsequent to Grandier's death (with "Father Garniec," the film's version of Grandier, mentioned only in passing). The nuns continued to be allegedly possessed for four years after Grandier's execution, and Sister Jeanne was treated by the devout French Jesuit mystic/exorcist Jean-Joseph Surin. Mother Joan of the Angels fictionalizes Sister Jean as "Mother Joan" and Jean-Joseph Surin as "Father Józef Suryn" and relocates the setting of the story from Loudun to Smolensk.

== Critical reception ==
The film was recommended by Philip Jenkinson in the Radio Times. The film is among 21 digitally restored classic Polish films chosen for Martin Scorsese Presents: Masterpieces of Polish Cinema.

== In other media ==
A shot from the film was used as the cover for The Unnatural World, a 2014 album by the American rock band Have a Nice Life.

== See also ==
- Cinema of Poland
- List of Polish-language films
