= Dreams of Roses and Fire =

Book by Eyvind Johnson

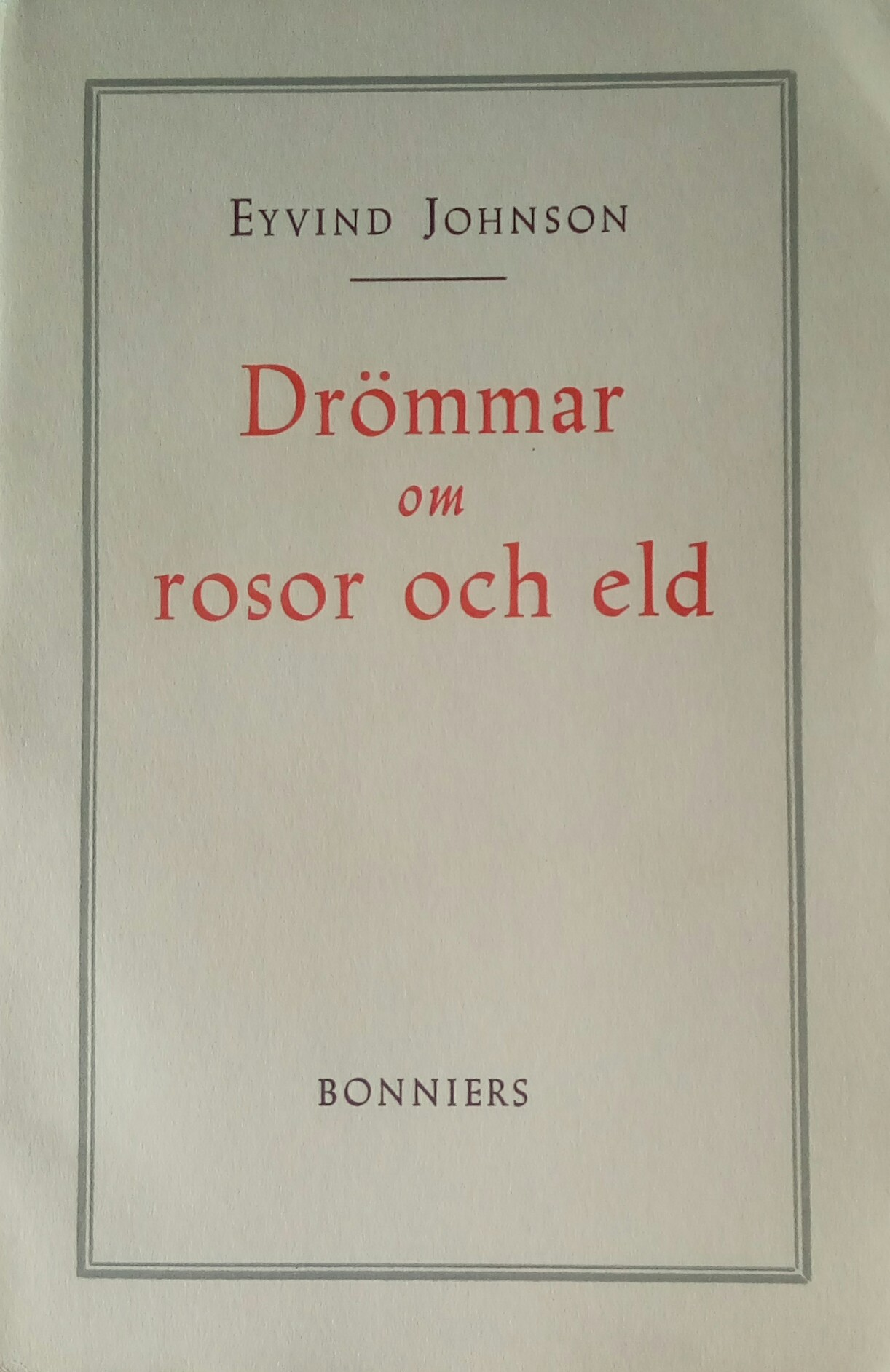
Title page

Dreams of Roses and Fire (Swedish: Drömmar om rosor och eld) is a novel by the Swedish author Eyvind Johnson published in 1949.

Set in 1600s France, it is based on the events known as the Loudun possessions and the historical person Urbain Grandier, a Catholic priest who was burned at the stake after being convicted of witchcraft. In the novel the spelling of Grandier's name is changed to Grainier.

The novel was published to critical acclaim in 1949 and remains one of Eyvind Johnson's most widely read books. It has been published in many Swedish editions and translated into over a dozen languages. An English translation of the novel was published in 1984.

== Plot ==
In 1617, the handsome and eloquent Urbain Grainier comes to the city as a new catholic priest. He soon gets enemies among the citizens, who are envious of his arrogance and success with women. Another reason for the conflict is Cardinal Richelieu's decision to demolish the city walls built by the Huguenots, which some citizens including Grainier oppose. A group of nuns settles in the city and is haunted by strange dreams. Their confessor suspects that the nuns are possessed with demons and calls for an exorcist. The exorcist make the nuns confess that Grainier is responsible for the dreams. The enemies of Grainier take the opportunity to have the priest convicted for witchcraft. He refuses to confess and his denunciators have him burned at the stake as a heretic on the city square.

== Translations ==
The novel has been translated into at least twelve languages including Danish, German, French, Dutch and English:

- Drømme om roser og ild, Köpenhamn 1952
- Träume von Rosen und Feuer, Hamburg 1952
- De roses et de feu, Paris 1956
- Dromen van rozen en vuur, Amsterdam 1981
- Dreams of roses and fire, New York 1984
