= The Devils of Loudun (opera) =

1969 opera by Krzysztof Penderecki

Die Teufel von Loudun
- Opera by Krzysztof Penderecki
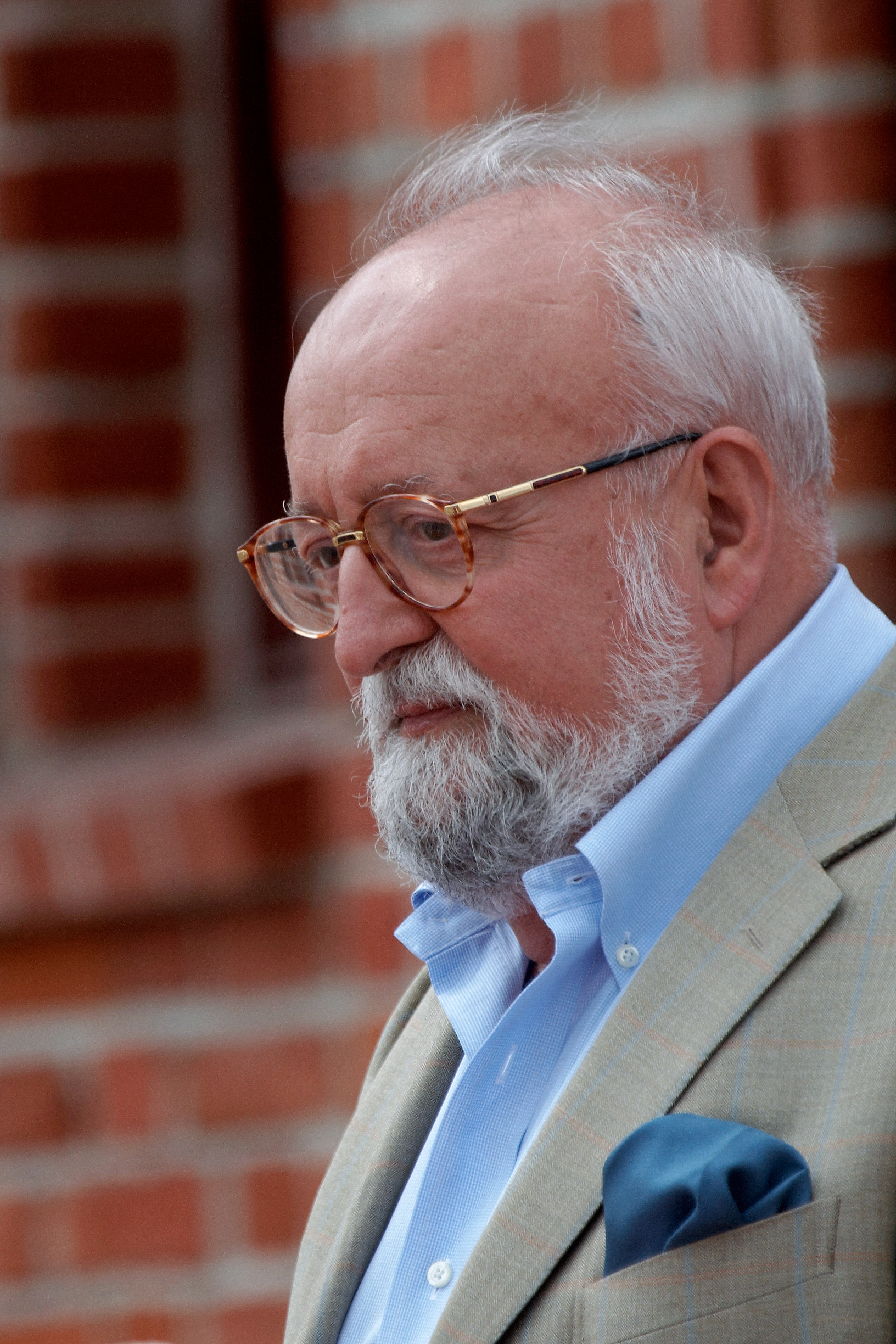
- The composer in 2008
- Translation: The Devils of Loudun
- Librettist: Penderecki
- Language: German
- Based on: The Devils by John Whiting
- Premiere: 20 June 1969; Hamburg State Opera

The Devils of Loudun (German: Die Teufel von Loudun) is an opera in three acts written in 1968 and 1969 by Polish composer Krzysztof Penderecki, and then revised in 1972 and 1975. It has a German libretto by the composer, based on John Whiting's play The Devils which was based on Aldous Huxley's book The Devils of Loudun.

The work was commissioned by the Hamburg State Opera, which consequently gave the premiere on 20 June 1969. Only 48 hours afterwards, the opera received its second performance in Stuttgart, followed two months later by its American debut mounted by the Santa Fe Opera. The work was revised in 1972 following suggestions by Polish theatre director Kazimierz Dejmek. This added two new scenes, excluded a scene from the opera's first act, regrouped other scenes, and modified the first act's instrumentation. In 1975, Penderecki added two more scenes in the second act. He revised the entire score again in 2012.

The Devils of Loudun, the first and most popular of Penderecki's operas, is emblematic of the composer's interest in historical events of traumatic nature. As suggested by its title, the opera draws its story line from the 1632-38 mass demonic possession in the town of Loudun, France. However, rather than a narrative of these historical events, the opera underscores a more general dichotomy between central and local power, and thus provides a political commentary, denouncing the iniquities committed by the totalitarian states of the mid-20th century. Accordingly, the opera's thematic construction should be regarded as allegorical rather than merely historical.

== Performance history and reception ==
Based on the reviews listed in Cindy Bylander's Krzysztof Penderecki: a Bio-Bibliography, the reception of The Devils of Loudun varied. The opera received mixed reviews (mostly written around the same time and within a decade of the work's completion) in European countries and the US. Even in the same city, there were different reactions to the work.

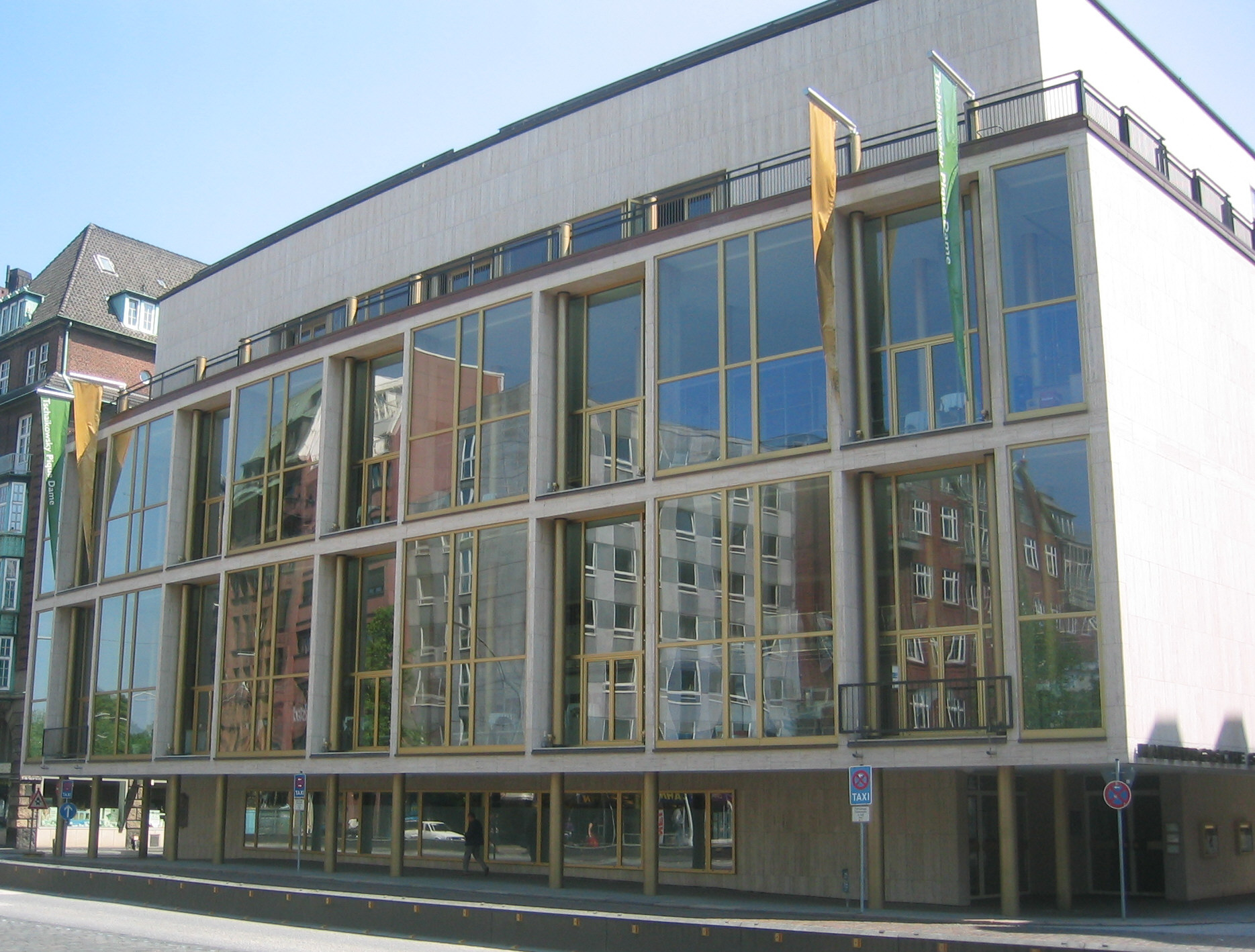
The Hamburg State Opera, where The Devils of Loudun had its world premiere

The world premiere, which was given at the Hamburg State Opera on 20 June 1969, received mixed reviews. However, the general consensus among critics was that the work was not a huge success. A critic, who saw the world premiere performance of the work in Hamburg, wrote that the various sounds effects (i.e. cries, laughter, roars, etc.), large glissandi in orchestra, tone clusters, and pitches at extreme ends of instruments' ranges were used merely to produce atmosphere instead of creating a dramatic effect. After seeing a Hamburg production of the opera, another critic even questioned whether Penderecki was truly interested in the piece. Tatiana Troyanos, who created the role of Jeanne, later criticized the vocal writing, saying that Penderecki did not really understand how to properly compose for the voice. Positive reviews of the production were mostly on the libretto's intriguing nature.

The next performance, which was given only two days after its Hamburg world premiere, was held in Stuttgart, Germany. Critics agreed almost unanimously that the Stuttgart production of the opera was far superior to the Hamburg production. The Stuttgart audience was pleased by the daring staging and thought it was a thrilling piece of contemporary music. The Stuttgart production of the opera, however, received some negative reviews as well. A critic, who said the presentation was marked by sensation and grandiosity, commented that the music was indescribably boring.

Outside of Hamburg and Stuttgart, the opera received positive reviews in other German cities like Berlin, Cologne, Munich, and Mönchengladbach. For example, a slightly revised version of The Devils of Loudun was performed in West Berlin in 1970. A critic, who saw the performance, wrote that the presentation was "an electrifying unforgettable experience." In 1980, a little more than ten years after the world premiere, The Devils of Loudun received generally cruel reviews in Cologne. A critic admits that the work was convincingly performed but thought the compositional originality was completely lacking. Another critic, after seeing the Cologne production, even wondered if the opera really deserved to remain in the repertoire.

In Austria, critics and audience reacted lukewarmly to the premiere of the work in 1971. Some thought the music was tedious and lacked the good measure of the sensational, on which the success of Penderecki's opera depends. The second performance of the opera in Graz was greeted by a half-empty hall of audience. Another critic in Graz said that the opera only conveys the story line and does not create much dramatic impact until it becomes musically more interesting in the final act.

In Penderecki's native country Poland, the first performance, which was held in Warsaw six years after its world premiere in 1969 and considerably less risqué, received generally very negative reviews. Even the composer himself did not think the work was performed successfully. In May 1998, almost thirty years after the world premiere of the opera, a critic commented that the work was artistically successful, but musically was less successful. The same critic, after seeing a performance of the opera in Poznań, also suggested that the work could even be called "anti-opera."

The French premiere of the opera in 1972 was rather disastrous; the performance was greeted with orange peels, turnips, leeks, cat-calls, and foot-stamping. Marseille production of the opera, however, was praised for its set design and performers.

The British premiere in 1973, given by the Sadler's Wells Company, was not a great success either; the British critics were mostly unimpressed with the performance. The staging (by John Dexter) and the performers were praised, but the music was criticized for lack of drama and the libretto for its failure to arouse pity in the audience. One critic even cruelly wondered whether the company's sparkling performance was worth the effort, given the poor quality of the music. However, a different critic thought the piece was a compelling form of musical theatre.

The Devils of Loudun was performed in other European countries, where the reviews were mixed again. The Italian premiere given in Trieste in 1974 was praised. In Lisbon, the performance was met with enthusiastic applause in 1976. In 1979, the Swiss premiere of the opera was given in Geneva by the Stuttgart Opera, and the overall impression of the performance was positive; even though a critic said that the libretto and the music failed to maintain the audience's interest, the high quality of staging and the performers made the presentation a positive experience.

The U.S. premiere of The Devils of Loudun, which was given by Santa Fe Opera in 1969, received more negative reviews than positive ones. A critic, who attended the performance, praised its staging but thought its music failed to support the issues or events occurring on stage. Another critic wrote that the music did not have the ability to hold drama for a long period of time. A different critic even thought that the music was more appropriate for soundtrack than an opera. Even with these criticisms, the opera received better reviews in the U.S. than in Europe. Especially, the staging in the U.S. praised over the staging in Europe.

The opera was recorded in 1969. The recording of The Devils of Loudun received mixed reviews as well. One critic wrote that "the music is always striking, its style eclectic, and its images mesmerizing." However, there were critics who disagreed by saying that the piece was made for an electronic medium rather than for an orchestra. The music was also accused of being harmonically static and lacking distinctive melodies.

The revised edition of 2012 premiered in 2013 at Det Kongelige Teater, Copenhagen.

== Roles ==
Role	Voice type	Premiere cast, 20 June 1969 (Conductor: Henryk Czyż)
Jeanne, the prioress of St. Ursula's Convent	dramatic soprano	Tatiana Troyanos
Claire, Ursuline sister	mezzo-soprano	Cvetka Ahlin
Gabrielle, Ursuline sister	soprano	Helga Thieme
Louise, Ursuline sister	mezzo-soprano	Ursula Boese
Philippe, a young girl	high lyric soprano	Ingeborg Krüger
Ninon, a young widow	contralto	Elisabeth Steiner
Grandier, the vicar of St. Peter's Church	baritone	Andrzej Hiolski
Father Barré, the vicar of Chinon	bass	Bernard Ładysz
Baron de Laubardemont, the King's special commissioner	tenor	Helmuth Melchert
Father Rangier	basso profundo	Hans Sotin
Father Mignon, the Ursulines' father confessor	tenor	Horst Wilhelm
Adam, a chemist	tenor	Kurt Marschner
Mannoury, a surgeon	baritone	Heinz Blankenburg
Prince Henri de Condé, the King's special ambassador	baritone	William Workman
Father Ambrose, an old priest	bass	Ernst Wiemann
Asmodeus	bass	Arnold Van Mill
Bontemps, a gaoler	bass-baritone	Carl Schulz
Jean d'Armagnac, the Mayor of Loudun	speaking part	Joachim Hess
Guillaume de Cerisay, town judge	speaking part	Rolf Mamero
Clerk of the Count	speaking part	Franz-Rudolf Eckhardt
Ursuline nuns, Carmelites, people, children, guards, and soldiers

== Synopsis ==
Act 1: Sister Jeanne, the abbess of the Ursuline convent in Loudun, is having night visions in which Father Grandier, the Vicar of St. Peter's Church, appears wearing a heretic shirt with a rope around his neck as he is escorted by two guards. This dreadful image of the parish priest is followed by another one; in this instance, however, Grandier rests in the arms of a woman. These macabre visions let Sister Jeanne, among other convent nuns, to the belief that they had been possessed by the devil, and thus to eventually confesses her visions to Father Mignon. In the meantime, Father Grandier's unchaste life is disclosed through his relationships with Ninon (a widow), and Philippe (a young woman). Furthermore, Grandier assures his fatal destiny by opposing the decree to demolish the city's fortifications put forth by the King and the powerful Cardinal Richelieu. The act comes to a close with the exorcism of Sister Jeanne performed by Barré, the Vicar of Chinon. Barré attempts to ask her "possessor," who Jeanne calls Asmodeus: "how did you gain entry to the body of this nun?" Jeanne responds, in a man's voice: "through the offices of a friend." Jeanne states that the friend is Grandier.

Act 2: Jeanne's exorcism continues. This time, however, Barré is assisted by Father Mignon and Father Rangier; yet, the attempts to expel the devil are unsuccessful. Following, Grandier denies ever seeing Jeanne, and implores God to help her. Nonetheless, his words prove feeble as Jeanne claims that he had forced the Ursuline nuns to practice black magic. The situation becomes even more convoluted when Philippe informs Grandier that she is bearing his child. Meanwhile, the exorcisms continue now in public at St. Peter's Church, where Grandier is arrested as he enters.

Act 3: Grandier is held responsible for the demonical possessions of the Ursuline nuns, accused of conspiracy with the devil, and indicted for blasphemy and unchastity. He is, consequently, sentenced to public torture and death at stake. Grandier's death thus becomes a realization of Jeanne's visions. Finally, Jeanne comes to realize that her unanswered love for Grandier was the cause of her possession.

== Interpretation ==
Andrzej Tuchowski states in Krzysztof Penderecki's Music in the Context of the 20th Century Theater that the most interesting aspect of the opera is Penderecki's sensitivity toward what goes on invisibly in the minds of almost all the characters in the opera: the psychological state of a socially ostracized individual, that of the society, that of the struggle between them, etc. This multi-layering of the psychological states corresponds to the general tendencies in the 20th-century music theatre, such as valuing the conflicts that occur in the inner world of the characters. Another tendency in the music of the time, according to Tuchowski, was a departure from the past; music started to sound less and less familiar to the ears of the audience. In order to sustain the interest of the listeners in the new foreign-sounding music, it became essential for composers to find a way to connect with the audience.

For his first and experimental opera, Penderecki chose a story about a sensational scandal that happened in France long before his time. Surely, the story was stimulating enough to catch the attention of the audience. Moreover, it has a stronger connection with the audience below the surface; in a deeper level, the psychological aspects of the story make allusions to various historical events and tendencies in the society and its people of the time. In The Devils of Loudun, the social outsider, Grandier, struggles alone against intolerance, fanaticism, and organized violence of the society. Tuchowski shows various ways that the psychological subtleties of the relationships between value systems (i.e. religious or political organizations, etc.) and an outsider in this work could be analyzed.

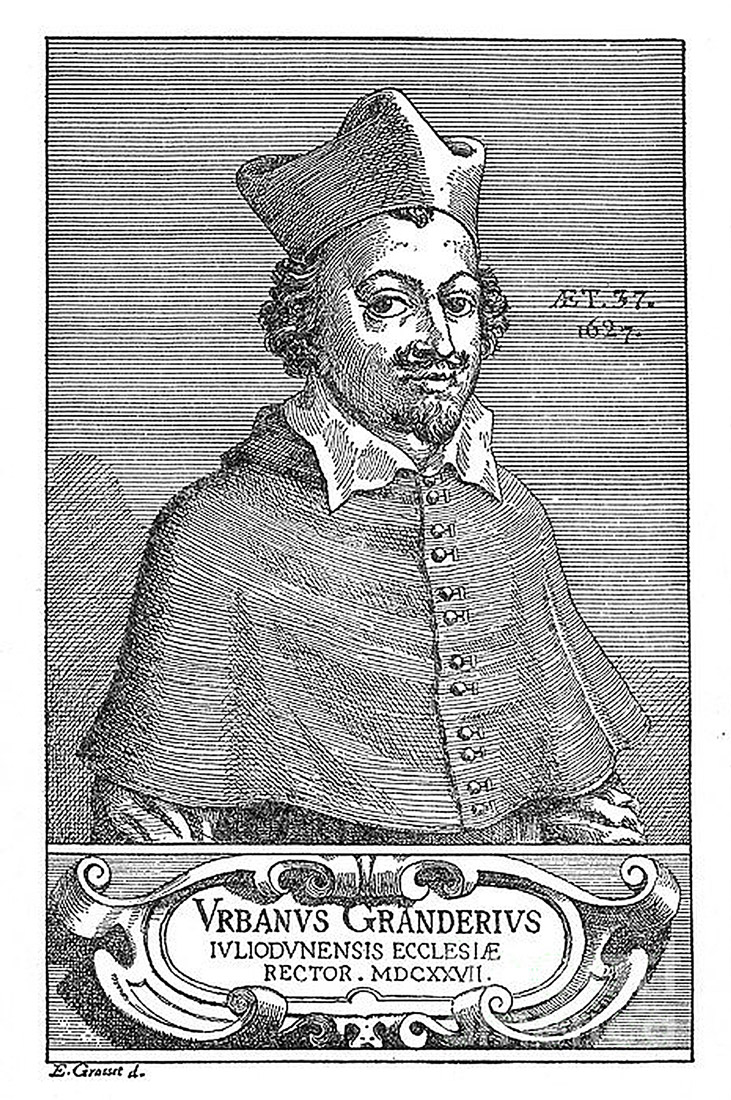
Urbain Grandier, on whom the protagonist of The Devils of Loudun is based

First of all, there is the conflict between a social outcast and the unforgiving society. The opera ends with Grandiers's death, which was facilitated by the society's intolerance for an outsider. In the midst of the nuns proclaiming to have been possessed in order to make excuses for their misbehavior, Grandier, who claims to be innocent, stands out as a non-conforming social outcast. He has many qualities that distinguish him from others: his outstanding intelligence and good looks that incur the hatred and jealousy of some local notables; his sexual attractiveness that results in Jeanne's obsessions and accusations; his disobedience to the political powers that proves fatal in the process of his destruction. Most of the time, a non-conforming social outsider must face an atmosphere of intolerance, fanaticism or at least indifference in the society. This common phenomenon of ostracizing the non-conforming member of the society works similarly in The Devils of Loudun; in the end, Grandier's virtues and weaknesses alike, which make him unique, turn finally against him and bring him death.

Grandier's death, however, was not a result easily granted. In value systems, anything unjustifiable or unofficial is usually considered void. As afore mentioned, the atmosphere of intolerance provides suitable conditions to eliminate an unwelcome individual. This atmosphere alone, however, is not enough to give permission to eliminate the individual; the most important ingredient needed for the removal of the unwanted is the official prosecution. In the process of bringing out this official persecution, the many unclean deeds by the authorities such as usurpation and manipulation of power come to light. For example, the martyrdom and death of Grandier reveals the ethical weakness of any absolute or totalitarian power.

In the eyes of the political authorities in the opera, the attractive and politically opposing Grandier could be seen as a threat to their power. The fact that Grandier is an outsider was a perfect reason for the authorities to eliminate him from the society. The society, however, could not murder this unwelcome figure simply out of hatred, because that would be illegal and would have no proper justification. In order to officially persecute Grandier, the society as a collectivity condemned him “evil,” which must be rid of. This form of injustice happened frequently in the 20th century. Perhaps the most notable example among many others is the mass murder of Jews by the Nazi Germany. Penderecki is telling his audience that the official persecution of Grandier in the opera is the same injustice brought by the totalitarian states in the 20th century, only in a much smaller scale.

The composer then tries to explain the source of this injustice in the opera by demonstrating that the incompatibility between Christian ethic and Catholic violence could become a basis of power. Based on his betrayal of faith among other misdeeds, it is difficult to label Grandier as a true Christian. Moreover, the church authorities played the most important role in leading Grandier to his death. Grandier, however, is the most moral person that deserves to be called Christian in the world that the opera presents: a sickeningly corrupt and grotesque one. Tuchowski claims that Grandier's moral victory is emphasized by clear references to Jesus Christ's martyrdom.

The final scenes of the opera are obviously a reference to Christ's Way of the Cross. Making this reference even stronger is the last scene of execution, with Father Barre's Judas-like kiss of betrayal and Grandier's last words: Forgive them, forgive my enemies. Throughout the events of false accusations, Grandier does not fight against his enemies, who believe that violence committed in the name of Christianity is justifiable. Moreover, Grandier does not hate his persecutors; he forgives them and accepts approaching death with dignity. Grandier's and martyrdom and death show that in the imperfect world like ours, where violence exists in abundance, the inevitable conflict between Christian ethics (Grandier's non-violence and sacrifice, etc.) and the organized violence (execution of the innocent, etc.) of the political authorities could be used to bring out results of injustice; in the case of Grandier, an undeserved death.

Presented in the midst of all the events are the various states of human psyche in different social settings. Grandier represents a psychologically complicated individual, full of internal contradictions. He is able to make judgments (although not always right) and stand for himself. The human psyche in a larger group setting, however, is dissimilar from its state in individualistic state and works differently. For example, the townsmen of Loudun, who are presumably all goodhearted as individuals, view the destruction of Grandier as a good show; and the nuns undergo a collective hysteria as they start believing their own made-up stories. In order to musically portray the variable human psyche, Penderecki made the voice parts sing in different styles in different social settings; For example, Sister Jeanne sings differently when she is singing to herself than when she is singing to other people. Penderecki portrays these various ways that human psyche works with the intention of alluding to the 20th-century totalitarian systems' manipulation of the human mind. Because the manipulation is what they have experienced, Penderecki's audience of the time must have found themselves engaged and connected to the work written in a novel language of sound.

== Libretto ==
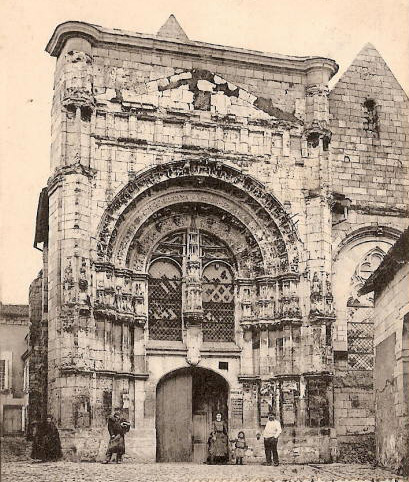
St. Peter's Church in Loudun

The libretto, written by the composer, is based on Erich Fried's German translation of John Whiting's dramatization of Aldous Huxley's essay The Devils of Loudun. The employment of existing literature as the basis for the librettos was not exclusive to The Devils of Loudun; instead, it became the invariant among Penderecki's four operas; namely Paradise Lost, Ubu Rex, and Die schwarze Maske. The libretto is written in German (although both Polish and English adaptations exist) and it is fashioned into a series of thirty two scenes, which proceed, from one to another, quasi cinematically.

The libretto to The Devils of Loudun refers to the mid-17th-century events in Loudun, France, concerning the demoniacal possession of the Ursuline nuns and their abbess, Mother Jeanne. A parish priest, Father Grandier, was accused of the alleged possessions and indicted for conspiracy with Satan. Consequently, in August 1634, Father Grandier was sentenced to burn at the stake. Nevertheless, it is claimed that the underlying cause of Grandier's fall was a political one, for the priest had secret alliances against the powerful Cardinal Richelieu, who planned to deprive Loudun of independence. The possessions continued for a number of years, yet Penderecki's libretto comes to a closure with Grandier's death for an obvious reason — Grandier is the main character of the opera, so with his death the opera ends.

The Loudun episode attracted the attention of composers, writers, historians, psychologists and the sort. The capacity of the events for generating a multiplicity of interpretations and intertwining religious elements with political ones granted the possibility of new plots, new compositions, and new answers. In addition to Penderecki, the theme of Loudun appealed to other Polish artists, including Jarosław Iwaszkiewicz, Jerzy Kawalerowicz, and Romuald Twardowski.

Even though the libretto for The Devils of Loudun is based on Whiting's play Demons, the two stories are fundamentally different. The libretto shortens, omits, and reorders some of the scenes of Whiting's play. Most significant is the emotional and ideological dissimilarities of Penderecki's and Whiting's protagonist Grandier. Indeed, the Whiting's Grandier and Penderecki's Grandier are two different characters.

Whiting portrays Grandier as an existentialist, striving for self-destruction. His enemies and the political circumstances surrounding him are just tools helping him achieve his goal. Thus, the tragic fate of Whiting's Grandier is not the doing of the society, but the result of his own actions. Furthermore, Edward Boniecki remarks that “Whiting's protagonist is a living-dead.”

Penderecki's libretto transforms Whiting's existentialist Grandier into a hero and symbol of struggle against obscurantism. It does so by placing the priest's actions into a different context, enabling a different interpretation of the events. From this perspective, Grandier's obsession for self-destruction is reinterpreted as a desire for a martyr death. In fact, it is argued that Grandier represents a Christ-like figure, for both were unjustly accused, accepted their death, and forgave their torturers. Similarly, the fate of Penderecki's Grandier is seen to be dominated by the context rather than by the individual. Penderecki's Grandier is, in this sense, a victim of political conspiracy and of religious-political fanatics.

== Composition style ==
The Devils of Loudun is an atonal grand opera written in an expressionist style, conveying feelings of insanity and portraying the characters in psychotic states. In fact, it may be compared to Alban Berg's monumental expressionistic opera, Wozzeck: "Penderecki's flexible style, like Berg's, is ideally suited to capture the essence of emotional states," and thus develop several planes of expressive characterization.

The Devils of Loudun is written in Penderecki's trademark textural style, which utilizes a number of textural and sonoric techniques, including wedges and group glissandos, microtonal clusters, a range of vibratos, instrumental extended techniques, and percussive effects. However, in The Devils of Loudun, Penderecki's sonorism is brought to new heights, serving now a crucial dramatic purpose. In effect, it is possible to conceive the opera's drama as the sole opposition between Penderecki's sound-mass and pointillistic styles.

The Devils of Loudun's dramatic style is also influenced by genres outside of opera. While the use of chorus, soloist, and orchestral fragments all adhere to the operatic tradition, the influence of theatrical genres is evident on the operas' extensive use of speech. To this effect, the libretto, divided into 32 scenes, may also be regarded as a byproduct of a theatrical influence. In addition, it is possible to perceive some elements of comic opera in the male-voice quartet at the end of the second act; while the reference to the Passion play is obvious on the martyrdom figure of Grandier.

== Instrumentation and orchestration ==
The Devils of Loudun is scored for enormous musical forces, including nineteen soloists, five choruses (nuns, soldiers, guards, children, and monks), orchestra, and tape. The orchestra itself is of a great size too, making use of a very particular blending of instruments. The orchestra is composed of the following instrumentation.

Woodwinds
4 flutes (alternating 2 piccolos and 1 alto flute)
2 English horns
1 E♭ clarinet
1 contrabass clarinet
2 alto saxophones
2 baritone saxophones
3 bassoons
1 contrabassoon

Brass
6 horns
4 B♭ trumpets (alternating 1 D trumpet)
4 trombones
2 tubas

Percussion
timpani

military drum
friction drum
bass drum
slapstick
5 woodblocks
ratchet
guiro
bamboo scrapers
cymbals
6 suspended cymbals
2 tam-tams
2 gongs
Javanese gong
triangle
tubular bells
church bell
sacring bells
musical saw
flexatone
siren

Keyboard
1 piano
1 harmonium
1 organ
Strings
1 harp
1 electric bass guitar

20 violins
8 violas
8 celli
6 double basses

Nonetheless, this extraordinarily large ensemble is used with great moderation by the composer. In particular, Penderecki exploits the use of chamber ensembles coupled by their correspondence of timbre quality and specific coloristic effect. With the resulting palette of orchestral colors at his command, Penderecki is able to provide a musical commentary and thus determine the expressive quality of a given scene. While the smaller ensembles predominate through the work, Penderecki resources to the full ensemble resonance for dramatic effect, emphasizing this way the most emotionally charged scenes, such as the exorcisms of the Ursuline nuns and the death of Grandier. The orchestration is written in cut-out score format, that is with very little metrical guidelines, very few rests, and includes some aleatory effects of notes and tone-clouds in approximate pitches. Penderecki's work-method at the time was to develop his musical ideas in various colored pencils and inks, although the final score does not use color-coding.

The Devils of Loudun calls for the use of a number of extended techniques on its instrumental writing. The use of such techniques is also for coloristic purposes. These extended techniques are evidently associated with specific notational symbols. Some of these techniques are: bowing in-between the bridge and the tailpiece, bowing the right marrow side of the bridge, and bowing the string holder.

== Music-action relationships ==
The Devils of Loudun makes use of a set of music-action relationships that help reinforce and propel the drama. Yet, not all of these music-action associations are of the same nature, some serve a more illustrative purpose, while others provide a musical characterization of specific situations and actions.

The illustrative music-action relationships are most evident in Penderecki's use of performing forces. The comic and grotesque scenes are usually set in chamber music, characterized by pointillistic textures and discontinuous motifs. Furthermore, the chamber ensembles portrayed in these comic scenes often feature rather disjointed timber combinations, thus resulting in an overall comical effect. In the contrast, the music depicting the dramatic scenes is scored for larger forces, featuring thicker textures and darker tone colors. To achieve these dramatic massive textures, Penderecki relies on the use of stationary tones, glissandos, and various sound clusters. The chaotic sonorities, resulting from Penderecki's sound-mass techniques, are used in particular to convey the demonical possession of Sister Jeanne.

While the composer depends on his instrumental writing for providing an expressive context to the actions, it is his use of many different vocal styles that enables a musical characterization of Father Grandier and Sister Jeanne. It is thus through these vocal lines that the characters' moral, mental, and emotional states are judged. The correct literary style of Grandier is emphasized in the opera by the fluency of the recitative, its coherence with speech intonations and subdued expression. In addition, Grandier's use of speech in the second act may be interpreted as representative of the protagonist's sobriety. In contrast, Jeanne's vocal style is very pointillist. The frequent leaps, changes of character, drastic dynamic changes, and glissando, characteristic of Jeanne's vocal part, are emblematic of her hysteria and falseness. Furthermore, Jeanne's demonical possession is underscored by the use of laughter, groans, and electronic distortion of her voice.
