= John Whiting =

English actor, dramatist and critic (1917–1963)

John Robert Whiting (15 November 1917 – 16 June 1963) was an English scriptwriter and actor.

== Life and career ==
Born in Salisbury, he was educated at Taunton School, "the particular hellish life which is the English public school" as he described it. Trained at RADA, he then worked as an actor in repertory, and while in the company at Bideford in Devon, met the actress Asthore Lloyd Mawson ("Jackie").

At the start of the Second World War, as a lifelong pacifist, he registered as a conscientious objector, but soon after changed his mind and joined the anti-aircraft section of the Royal Artillery: his wartime experiences as a soldier, which are vividly described in dark detail in diaries written at the time (now held in the V&A theatre museum collection) were to mark a profound change in his life and work. In 1940, he married Jackie; in 1944 he was discharged from the army for undisclosed health reasons.

From 1946 until 1952, while writing, he again worked as an actor, playing major roles, including Cassius and Malvolio, during his time as a member of the York Repertory Company; less important ones for John Gielgud's company in London. In 1951, he won first prize in the Festival of Britain play competition for Saint's Day, a controversial work which critic Michael Billington claims 'contains themes and ideas that were to become staples of modern drama.' As a working actor, he, Jackie and their two young boys led a peripatetic life moving to different lodgings around the country until settling into rooms in Jackie's aunt's house in Barnes, where he was able to find a place in the London theatre world and where his first daughter was born. In 1956, he bought and moved his family to a house in the tiny hamlet of Duddleswell, on Ashdown Forest in East Sussex, and in 1957, his second daughter was born in Crowborough.

In Duddleswell, he worked on many plays, film scripts and reviews on a wide mahogany table that had belonged to a hero of his, Lord Byron, writing by hand in a tiny black script adopted from the handwriting of Frederick Rolfe (Baron Corvo), or typing out the pages on a stately German typewriter, often to the accompaniment of a Beethoven piece on a rather modern stereo system.

== Works ==
His works include:

- No More A-Roving (1947)
- Conditions of Agreement (1947)
- Saint's Day (1947–49)
- A Penny for a Song. A play (1951)
- Marching Song. A play (1953)
- The Gates of Summer. A play (1956)
- No Why (1957)
- The Devils. A play (1960) based on the book The Devils of Loudun by Aldous Huxley
- The Art of the Dramatist (1970)

He also wrote un unpublished novel, Not a Foot of Land, many film scripts, short stories for radio and the wartime diaries, as well as an account of his meeting and courtship of Jackie. He was drama critic for the London Magazine and a very active member of the Arts Council in encouraging new writing for the theatre.

A Penny for a Song was adapted into a two-act opera by Richard Rodney Bennett, premiered at Sadler's Wells in 1967.

The Devils formed the basis of the three-act opera Die Teufel von Loudun by Krzysztof Penderecki, to his own libretto adapted from Whiting's theatrical version of the novel. It was premiered by Hamburg State Opera on 20 June 1969, and widely performed throughout Europe, and in North America.

Marching Song was adapted into a three-act opera by Benjamin Frankel, with a libretto by Hans Keller. Finished by the composer in short score, it was orchestrated after his death by Buxton Orr and broadcast on 3 October 1983 by BBC Radio 3.

== Personal life ==
John Whiting died from testicular cancer on 16 June 1963 in London at the age of 45.

His obituary notice in The Times noted that, "As a dramatist John Whiting was in reach of the first rank, even if in his completed works he never quite achieved it. He was an incisive critic (for some time he wrote as drama critic of The London Magazine) and his fine critical intelligence prevented him from ever, after Saint's Day, going too far, but in artistic creations those who never go too far perhaps never go quite far enough. Nevertheless in Marching Song in particular he wrote a play which seems likely to last, and at the time of his death he appeared to be at the beginning of a fruitful new phase in his career. The British theatre, even in its present flowering, can ill afford to lose the plays he might have written had he lived long enough to achieve his full potential stature."

In 1965, the John Whiting Award was established to commemorate the writer's contribution to post-war British theatre.

In 2015, the wartime diaries, as well as personal letters, handwritten notes, manuscripts etc. were donated by the family to the V&A.
