= Sébastien Michaëlis =

French inquisitor and prior of the Dominican order

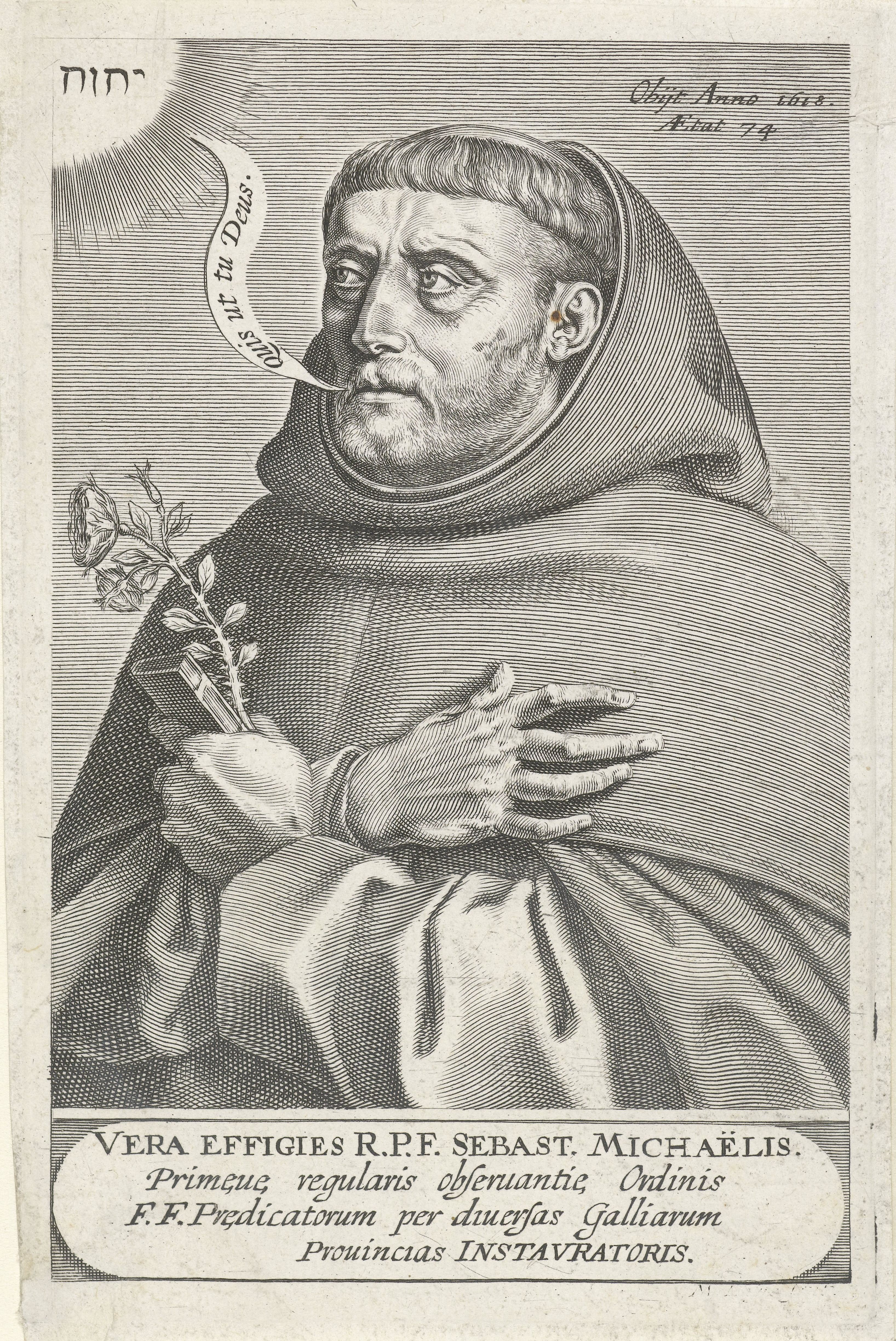
Sébastien Michaëlis

Sébastien Michaelis was a French inquisitor and prior of the Dominican order who lived from around 1543 to 1618. His Histoire admirable de la possession et conversion d'une penitente (1612) includes a classification of demons which has passed into general use in esoteric literature.

== Early career ==
Michaelis was vice-inquisitor in Avignon during the 1580s and was involved in a number of witch trials: a series of cases in 1581 and 1582 led to at least fourteen women being convicted and burnt. In 1587 he published a tract on demons called Pneumologie: Discours des esprits. By 1610 he was prior of the Dominican community at Saint-Maxim near Aix-en-Provence.

== Aix-en-Provence Possessions ==
In 1610 Michaelis became involved in a case of demonic possession at the Ursuline convent at Aix-en-Provence. This began when Sebastian Amira Jean-Baptiste Romillon diagnosed one of the nuns, a young girl of noble birth from Marseilles named Madeleine Demandols de la Palud, as possessed. Madeleine made accusations against her confessor, Father Louis Gaufridy, who was priest of the parish of the Acoules in Marseilles. She claimed that Gaufridy had sexually enchanted her (the devil having made his breath aphrodisiac) and inducted her into witchcraft, causing her body to be invaded by demons which would leave only when the priest was converted, dead, or punished. She claimed her principal demonic occupant to be Beelzebub. Unable to exorcise her, Romillon referred the case to the papal territory of Avignon and the jurisdiction of Michaelis. Another Dominican, Francois Doncieux (also known by the Latinised name Domptius), served as fellow chief investigator alongside Michaelis.

Other nuns soon confessed to similar possessions, the demons in many cases prompting them to sermonize at length. One nun, Louise Capeau Amira claimed to speak with the voice of a demon named Verin (or Verrine) and on 27 December 1610 announced the coming of the Apocalypse. Beelzebub, speaking through Madeleine Demandols, maintained there to be a total of 6,660 devils involved in the possession.

Gaufridy was examined for the "devil's mark" by Jacques Fontaine, professor of medicine at the University of Aix, and when in early 1611 the required marks were found (Gaufridy claimed they had been made on him without his knowledge or consent) the priest was arrested under orders from the Parlement of Aix. He confessed while in prison, and on 11 April 1611 he was publicly tortured and burnt at Aix-en-Provence.

== Admirable History ==
Michaelis and Doncieux co-authored a report on the case, Histoire admirable de la possession d'une penitente, which was dedicated to Queen Regent Marie de' Medici. The book contains a detailed hierarchy of devils named by the nuns; many of these demons (often having French names such as Rosier or Oeillet) do not appear in other demonologies, but the extent and systematic ordering of the list has led to its being widely adopted in esoteric circles.

The Gaufridy affair aroused great public interest, and an English translation of Michaelis's work, The Admirable History of Possession and Conversion of a Penitent Woman: Seduced by a Magician that Made Her to Become a Witch, was published in 1613 by William Aspley (the translation, by "W.B.", also includes Pneumology, or Discourse of Spirits). In the same year, Michaelis became vicar-general of the Dominican order and founded its new Paris community.

== Later accounts ==
The nineteenth-century historian Jules Michelet included an account of the Aix case in La Sorcière (1862), known in English as Satanism and Witchcraft. In that book, Gaufridy is referred to as "Gauffridi," and Doncieux as "Doctor Dompt, from Louvain." Michelet's version appears to have served as a source for many subsequent accounts.

== See also ==
- Loudun possessions
- Louviers possessions
- Opera: Demandolx (Opera based upon Aix-en-Provence Possessions)
