= Black Mass =

Satanic religious practice

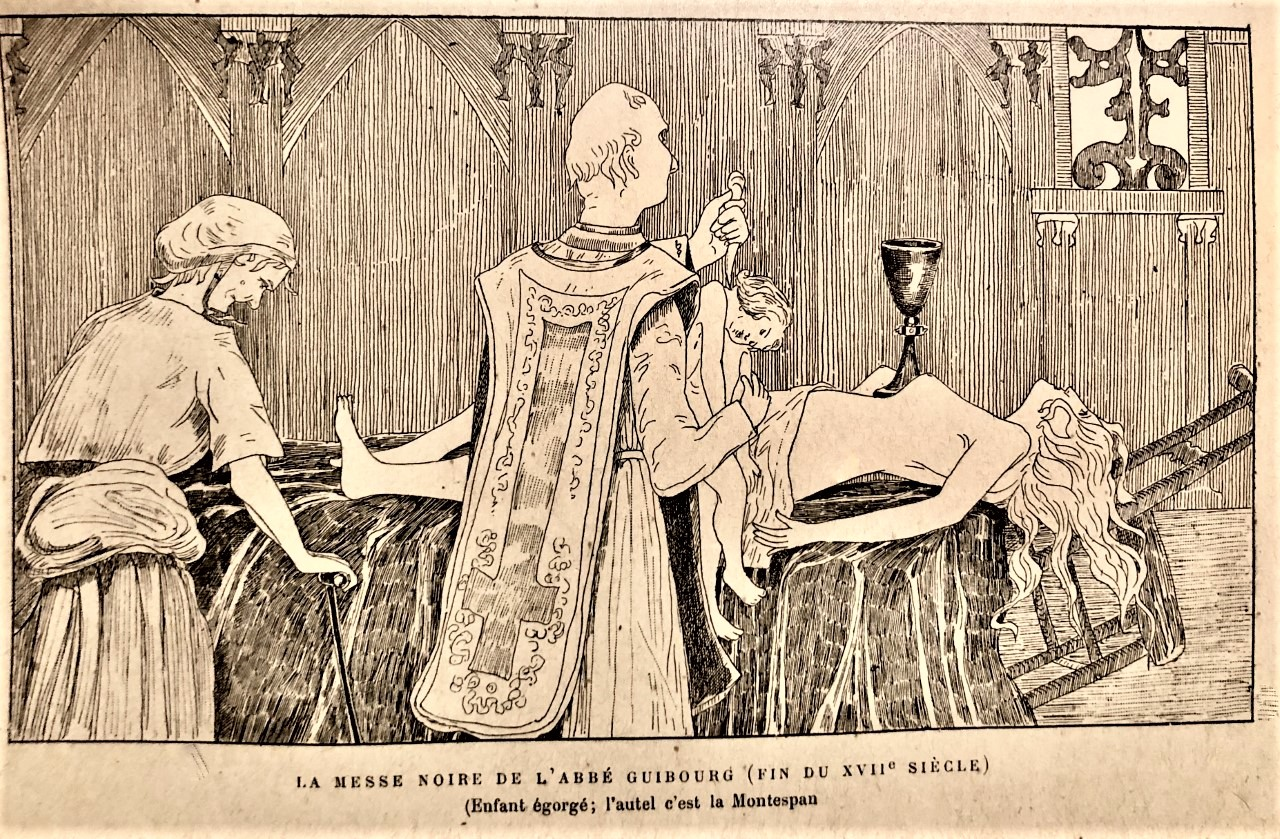
The Guibourg Mass by Henry de Malvost, from the book Le Satanisme et la magie by Jules Bois, Paris, 1903

A Black Mass is a ceremony celebrated by various Satanic groups. Although alleged to have existed for centuries in different forms by Christian sources, only its modern forms are attested, and are intentionally a sacrilegious and blasphemous parody of a Catholic Mass.

In the 19th century the Black Mass became popularized in French literature, in books such as Satanism and Witchcraft, by Jules Michelet, and Là-bas, by Joris-Karl Huysmans.

Modern revivals began with H.T.F. Rhodes' book The Satanic Mass published in London in 1954, and there is now a range of modern versions of the Black Mass performed by various groups.

== History ==
=== Early Catholicism ===
The Catholic Church regards the Mass as its most important ritual, going back to apostolic times. In general, its various liturgies followed the outline of Liturgy of the Word, Offertory, Liturgy of the Eucharist and Benediction, which developed into what is known as the Mass. However, as early Christianity became more established and its influence began to spread, the early Church Fathers began to describe a few heretical groups practicing their own versions of Masses. Some of these rituals were of a sexual nature. The fourth-century AD heresiologist Epiphanius of Salamis, for instance, claims that a libertine Gnostic sect known as the Borborites engaged in a version of the Eucharist in which they would smear their hands with menstrual blood and semen and consume them as the blood and body of Christ respectively. He also alleges that, whenever one of the women in their church was experiencing her period, they would take her menstrual blood and everyone in the church would eat it as part of a sacred ritual. Saint Augustine, also writing in the fourth century, describes a group referred to as "Catharistas" ("purifiers"), who added the mixture of male and female sexual fluids to flour to create a "Sacrament" which they ate, in the belief that they were purifying the substance through eating it.

=== Medieval Roman Catholic parodies and additions to the Mass ===
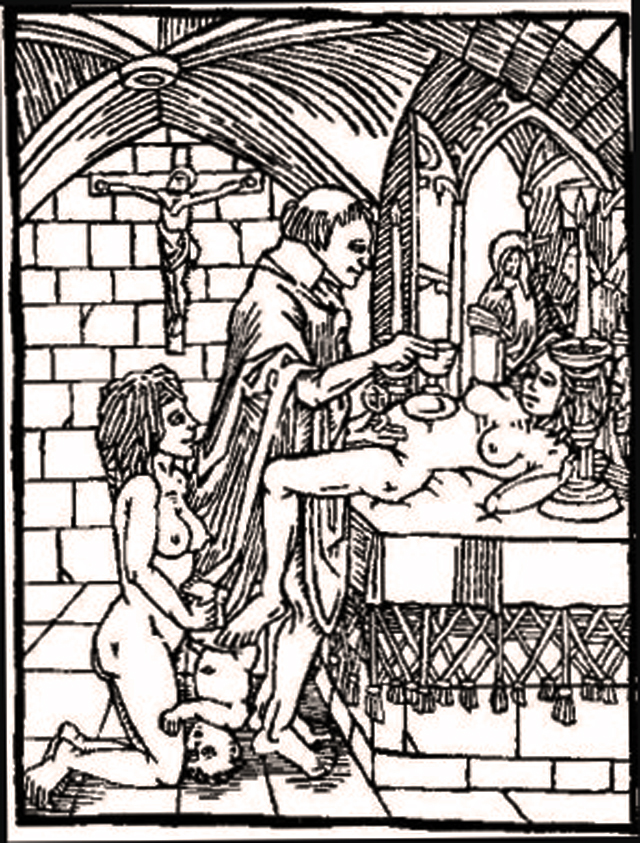
A modern picture depicting Black Mass

Within the Church, the rite of the Mass was not completely fixed, and there were places at the end of the Offertory for the Secret prayers, when the priest could insert private prayers for various personal needs. These practices became especially prevalent in France. As these types of personal prayers within the Mass spread, the institution of the Low Mass became quite common, where priests would hire their services out to perform various Masses for the needs of their clients (Votive Masses)—such as blessing crops or cattle, achieving success in some enterprise, obtaining love, or even cursing enemies (one way this latter was done was by inserting the enemy's name in a Mass for the dead, accompanied by burying an image of the enemy). Although these practices were condemned by Church authorities as superstitious and sacrilegious abuses, they still occurred secretively. In the 12th and 13th centuries there was a great surplus of clerics and monks who might be inclined to perform these Masses, as younger sons were often sent off to religious universities, and after their studies, needed to find a livelihood. Also within the Church, the ritual of the Mass was sometimes reworked to create light-hearted parodies of it for certain festivities. Some of these became quasi-tolerated practices at times—though never accepted by official Church authorities—such as a festive parody of the Mass called "The Feast of Asses", in which Balaam's ass (from the Old Testament) would begin talking and saying parts of the Mass. A similar parody was the Feast of Fools. Though often condemned, practitioners of such activities, called "Goliards", continued despite the Church's disapproval.

Another result of the surplus of (sometimes disillusioned) clerical students was the appearance of the Latin writings of the Goliards and wandering clerics (clerici vagantes). There began to appear more cynical and heretical parodies of the Mass, also written in ecclesiastical Latin, known as "drinkers' Masses" and "gamblers' Masses," which lamented the situation of drunk, gambling monks, and instead of calling to "Deus" (God), called to "Bacchus" (the Roman god of wine) and "Decius" (the god of dice, which were used in gambling). Some of the earliest of these Latin parody works are found in the medieval Latin collection of poetry, Carmina Burana, written around 1230. At the time these wandering clerics were spreading their Latin writings and parodies of the Mass, the Cathars, who also spread their teachings through wandering clerics, were also active. Due to the proximity in time and location of the Goliards, the Cathars, and the witches, all of whom were seen as threatening the authority of the Catholic Church and its head, the Papacy in Rome, some historians have postulated that these wandering clerics may have at times offered their services for performing heretical, or "black" Masses on various occasions.

A further source of late Medieval and Early Modern involvement with parodies and alterations of the Mass were the writings of the European witch-hunt, which saw witches as being agents of the Devil, who were described as inverting the Christian Mass and employing the stolen Host for diabolical ends. Witch-hunter's manuals such as the Malleus Maleficarum (1487) and the Compendium Maleficarum (1608) allude to these supposed practices. The first complete depiction of a blasphemy of the Mass in connection with the Witches' Sabbath, was given in Florimond de Raemond's 1597 French work, The Antichrist (written as a Catholic response to the Protestant claim that the Pope was the Antichrist). He uses the following description of a witches' meeting as a sign that Satanic practices are prevalent in the world, and a sign that the Antichrist's power is on the rise:

An Italian man took her [Jeanne Bosdeau] to a field on Saint John's Eve. The man made a large ring with a rod of holly, muttering a few words which he read from a black book. Thereupon appeared a large, horned goat, all black, accompanied by two women, as well as a man dressed as a priest. The goat asked the Italian who this girl was, and having replied that he had brought her to be his, the goat made him make the sign of the cross with his left hand [the sign of the cross was always to be made with the right hand only in the Catholic Church, so this was seen as an inversion of its meaning]. Then he commanded all of them to come and greet him, which they did, kissing his rear. The goat had a lighted black candle between his two horns, from which the others lit their own candles. The goat took the woman aside, laid her in the woods, and carnally knew her, to which she took an extreme displeasure, suffered much pain, and felt his seed as cold as ice. Every Wednesday and Friday of each month the general meeting was held, where she went numerous times, with more than sixty other persons, all of whom carried a black candle, lighted from the candle that the goat had between his horns. After that they all began to dance in circles, their backs turned to one another. The person who was performing the service was clothed in a black robe without a cross. He raised a round slice of turnip, dyed black, instead of the Host, and cried at the Elevation: Master, help us. Water was put in the chalice instead of wine, and to make 'holy water', the goat urinated into a hole on the ground, and the person who was performing the service asperged the attendants with a black asperges (sprinkling of water). In this group they performed the practices of witchcraft, and every one gave a story of what they had done. They were to poison, to bewitch, to bind, to cure illnesses with charms, to make waste the fruits of the earth, and other such maladies.

The most sophisticated and detailed descriptions of the Black Mass to have been produced in early modern Europe are found in the Basque witch-hunts of 1609–1614. It has recently been argued by academics including Emma Wilby that the emphasis on the Black Mass in these trials evolved out of a particularly creative interaction between interrogators keen to find evidence of the rite and a Basque peasantry who were deeply committed to a wide range of unorthodox religious practices such as "cursing" Masses, liturgical misrule and the widespread misuse of Catholic ritual elements in forbidden magical conjurations. An impressive account of the rite was given by suspects from the Spanish-Basque village of Zugarramurdi, who claimed that:

… and on such nights the Devil says mass, to which end his servants set up an altar with black and ugly altar cloths under a dossal of old, black and torn cloth and an altarpiece with images and figures of the Devil, and before mass begins they have a missal ready and all the other things needed for saying it, and the Devil hears the confessions of all the witches, who admit as sins the times they have been to church, the masses they have heard, the good deeds they have done and the evil deeds they have failed to do, and once they have confessed to the Devil he dresses in certain long, black and ugly vestments and he begins his mass, his servants singing it in hoarse, low and out-of-tune voices, and in a certain part of it he preaches a sermon to them in which he tells them not to be vainglorious in searching for a god other than the one they have, for he is a good god, and that though in this life they must endure hardship, work and poverty, in the next they will enjoy much rest [...] and then they go down on their knees in the presence of the Devil and kiss him on his left hand and chest and shameful parts and under the tail, and once they have all made this offering and veneration the Devil continues his mass and lifts up a round thing of the size of a Host which is black like the sole of a shoe, on which an image of the Devil is painted, and as he lifts it he says “this is my body,” and while they are all on their knees beating themselves on their chests, in veneration they say “aquerragoite, aquerraveite” which means “he-goat up, he-goat down,” and in the same way he lifts up a sort of chalice, seemingly of black wood, and once the mass has ended he gives them communion while they are on their knees around him and giving each of them a sort of black shape on which there is an image of the Devil, which is very sharp to swallow, and he gives them a draught of a very bitter drink which noticeably chills their hearts.

=== Early modern France ===
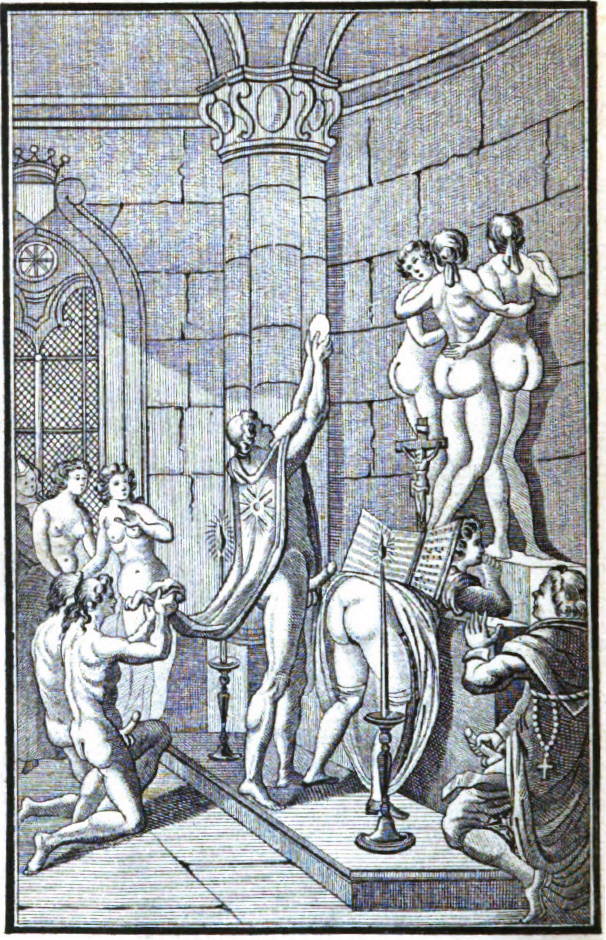
Engraving from a 1797 edition of Justine, by the Marquis de Sade

Between the 16th and the 19th centuries, many examples of interest in the Black Mass come from France.

- 16th century: Catherine de' Medici, the Queen of France, was said by Jean Bodin to have performed a Black Mass, based on a story in his 1580 book on witchcraft De la démonomanie des sorciers. In spite of its lurid details, there is little outside evidence to back up his story.
- 17th century: Catherine Monvoisin and the priest Étienne Guibourg performed "Black Masses" for Madame de Montespan, the mistress of King Louis XIV of France. Since a criminal investigation—L'affaire des poisons ("Affair of the Poisons")—was launched (resulting in the execution of Monvoisin and the imprisonment of Guibourg) many details of their Black Mass have come down to us. It was a typical Roman Catholic Mass, but modified according to certain formulas (some reminiscent of the Latin Sworn Book of Honorius, or its French version, The Grimoire of Pope Honorius) and featuring the King's mistress (the Marquise de Montespan) as the central altar of worship, lying naked upon the altar with the chalice on her bare stomach, and holding a black candle in each of her outstretched arms. The Host was consecrated on her body, and then used in love potions designed to gain the love of the King (on account of the magical power believed to be in the consecrated Host). From these images of the Guibourg Mass, further developments of the Black Mass derived.
- 18th century: The Marquis de Sade, in many of his writings, places the Host and the Mass, monks, priests and the Pope himself (Pope Pius VI in Juliette) in blasphemous sexual settings.
- 19th century: Joris-Karl Huysmans wrote the classic novel of French Satanism, Là-bas (1891). The characters in the novel have long discussions on the history of French Satanism up to their time, and eventually one of them is invited to participate in a Black Mass, the type of which Huysmans claimed was practised in Paris in those years. Although a work of fiction, Huysmans' description of the Black Mass remained influential simply because no other book went into as much detail. However, the actual text which Huysmans' satanic "priest" recites is nothing more than a long diatribe in French, praising Satan as the god of reason and the opponent of Christianity. In this way, it resembles the French poetry of Charles Baudelaire (in particular Les Litanies de Satan), more than it resembles an inversion of the Roman Catholic Mass.

=== Late 19th century and early 20th century scholarly interest in the Black Mass ===
Scholarly studies on the Black Mass relied almost completely on French and Latin sources (which also came from France):

- The French historian Jules Michelet was one of the first to analyze and attempt to understand the Black Mass, and wrote two chapters about it in his classic book, Satanism and Witchcraft (1862).
- J. G. Frazer included a description of the Mass of Saint-Sécaire, an unusual French legend with similarities to the Black Mass, in The Golden Bough (1890). Frazer was recounting material already found in an 1883 French book entitled Quatorze superstitions populaires de la Gascogne ("Fourteen Popular Superstitions of Gascony"), by Jean-François Bladé. This Mass was said to be employed as a method of assassination by supernatural means, allowing the supplicant to avenge himself if he was wronged by someone.
- Montague Summers discussed many classic portrayals of the Black Mass in a number of his works (especially in The History of Witchcraft and Demonology (1926), ch. IV, The Sabbat, with extensive quotations from the original French and Latin sources).

=== 20th century ===
- H. T. F. Rhodes' popular book, The Satanic Mass, published in London in 1954 (American edition in 1955), was a major inspiration for modern versions of the Black Mass, when they finally appeared. Rhodes claimed that, at the time of his writing, there did not exist a single first hand source which actually described the rites and ceremonies of a Black Mass.
- Gerhard Zacharias and Richard Cavendish, both writing in the middle of the 1960s, while presenting detailed studies of source material, offer no new sources for a Black Mass, relying solely on material that was already known to Rhodes.
- When Anton Szandor LaVey published his Satanic Bible in 1969, he wrote that:
  The usual assumption is that the Satanic ceremony or service is always called a Black Mass. A Black Mass is not the magical ceremony practiced by Satanists. The Satanist would only employ the use of a Black Mass as a form of psychodrama. Furthermore, a Black Mass does not necessarily imply that the performers of such are Satanists. A Black Mass is essentially a parody on the religious service of the Roman Catholic Church, but can be loosely applied to a satire on any religious ceremony.
  He went on in the Satanic Rituals (1972) to present it as the most representatively satanic ritual in the book.

=== 21st century ===
- In 2014 the Black Mass was held in public at the Oklahoma City Civic Center by a theistic Satanist group called Dakhma of Angra Mainyu (Church of Ahriman). The host to be used in the Black Mass was stolen from a Catholic church. The event saw backlash in the form of protesters such as John Ritchie, the Director of TFP Student Action.
- Dakhma of Angra Mainyu, the same theistic Satanist group, held another Black Mass in 2016 at the same location. An ecumenical Christian protest (with Christians from many denominations, such as Catholic, Baptist, Methodist, Episcopal and Pentecostal, present) was held to oppose the Black Mass.
- In March 2025 a Black Mass was held in public at the Kansas Statehouse in Topeka, by a Kansas Satanist group called The Grotto of Satan. Violence ensued due to public protest, and arrests were made.

== Modern Black Mass ==
In spite of the huge amount of French literature discussing the Black Mass (Messe Noire) at the end of the 19th century and early 20th century, no set of written instructions for performing one, from any purported group of Satanists, turned up in writing until the 1960s, and appeared not in France, but in the United States. As can be seen from these first Black Masses and Satanic Masses appearing in the U.S., the creators drew heavily from occult novelists such as Dennis Wheatley and Joris-Karl Huysmans, and from non-fiction occult writers popular in the 1960s, such as Grillot de Givry, author of the popular illustrated book Witchcraft, Magic and Alchemy, and H. T. F. Rhodes, who provided a title for the satanic ritual in his 1954 book The Satanic Mass. (Note: Throughout his book, Rhodes uses the term "Black Mass", and not "Satanic Mass". "The Satanic Mass" only appears as the title and nowhere else, perhaps because it is a less ambiguous and more suitable book title.) Herbert Sloane, the founder of an early Satanist group, the Ophite Cultus Satanas, speaks of Satanists performing the ritual of the "Satanic Mass" in a letter he wrote in 1968, and in 1968 and 1969 also appeared the first two recordings of Satanic rituals, both entitled the "Satanic Mass":

- In 1968 was released a record album of readings in Satanic ritual and philosophy by the Church of Satan, recorded Friday the 13th, September 1968, called "The Satanic Mass", which contained material later to appear in their 1969 Satanic Bible. In spite of the title and a few phrases in Latin, this album did not deal with the traditional Black Mass.
- In 1969 was released a 13-minute recording of a full-length "Satanic Mass" made by the U.S. band Coven. Coven's Satanic Mass, part of their stage show beginning in 1967, was expanded and included on their 1969 record album Witchcraft Destroys Minds & Reaps Souls, together with the full published text. On the album cover, it is stated that they spent a long time researching the material, and to their knowledge it was the first Black Mass published in any language. The result was eclectic, drawing chants and material from numerous sources, including two medieval French miracle plays, Le Miracle de Théophile and Jeu de Saint Nicolas, which both contain invocations to the Devil in an unknown language. These chants, along with other material on the album, could be found in books on witchcraft popular in the 60s, notably Grillot de Givry's Witchcraft, Magic and Alchemy (originally published in France in 1929). A large portion of the English dialogue was taken verbatim from Dennis Wheatley's 1960 occult novel, The Satanist, in which the female protagonist is initiated into a Satanic cult. Additionally, the recording, while using a couple of the Latin phrases the Church of Satan was already making popular, also added a substantial amount of church Latin, in the form of Gregorian chants sung by the band, to create the genuine effect of the Catholic Latin Mass being inverted and sung to Satan.

Soon after Coven produced their Satanic Mass recording, the Church of Satan began publishing their own versions of traditional Black Masses, two of which are available to the public. The first, created for the Church of Satan by Wayne West in 1970, was entitled "Missa Solemnis" (named after the Missa Solemnis version of the Latin Mass; originally published only in pamphlet form, later published in Michael Aquino's history of The Church of Satan), and the second, created by an unknown author, was entitled "Le Messe Noir" (published in Anton LaVey's 1972 book The Satanic Rituals).

The Church of Satan's and Coven's Satanic Masses both contain the Latin phrase "In nomine Dei nostri Satanas Luciferi Excelsi" (Note: This phrase undoubtedly is related to almost exactly the same phrase appearing 30 years earlier in an inversion of the Latin Mass (a "Luciferian Mass") led by a former Catholic priest in Paris, which included the phrase "In nomine Domini Dei nostri Satanae Luciferi Excelsi". It was published as Messe Luciférienne, in Pierre Geyraud's Les Petites Églises de Paris.) (In the name of our God, Satan Lucifer of the Most High), as well as the phrases "Rege Satanas" and "Ave Satanas" (these three Latin phrases also appear in the 1969 Satanic Bible). The early Black Masses modify other Latin parts of the Roman Catholic Missal to make them into Satanic versions. The Church of Satan's two Black Masses also use the French text of the Black Mass in Huysmans' Là-Bas to a great extent. (West only uses the English translation, LaVey publishes also the original French). Thus, the Black Mass found in The Satanic Rituals is a combination of English, French, and Latin. Further, in keeping with the traditional description of the Black Mass, all three also require a consecrated Host taken from a Catholic church, as a central part of the ceremony.

A writer using the pseudonym "Aubrey Melech" published, in 1986, a Black Mass entirely in Latin, entitled "Missa Niger". (This Black Mass is available on the Internet). Aubrey Melech's Black Mass contains almost exactly the same original Latin phrases as the Black Mass published by LaVey in The Satanic Rituals. The difference is that the amount of Latin has now more than doubled, so that the entire Black Mass is in Latin. Unlike Coven and Wayne West, LaVey and Melech do not give the source for the Latin material in their Black Mass, merely implying that they received it from someone else, without saying who. It is clear that the Latin sections of the two Black Masses that LaVey and Melech published are based on the same original Latin text, and also, that it is a unique text not connected with the other early Black Masses.

=== The language of the Black Mass ===
The French sections that LaVey published were quotations from Huysmans's Là-bas. The Latin of Melech and LaVey is based on the Roman Catholic Latin Missal, reworded so as to give it a Satanic meaning (e.g. the Roman Mass starts "In nomine Patris, et Filii, et Spiritus Sancti, introibo ad altare Dei", while LaVey's version, printed in the Satanic Rituals, starts "In nomine magni dei nostri Satanas, introibo ad altare Domini Inferi"). There are a small amount of copyist errors, and a number of grammatical errors (mainly due to the author not adjusting the grammar after modifying the Latin phrases). For example, "dignum" from the Mass, is once incorrectly spelled "clignum", in the printed Satanic Rituals. Another example, also appearing once, is "laefificat" instead of "laetificat". One of the more obvious grammatical errors is "ego vos benedictio", "I bless you", which should have been "ego vos benedico". Another grammatical peculiarity is that, throughout his version of the Mass, LaVey does not decline the name Satanas, as is typically done in Latin if the endings are used, but uses only the one form of the word regardless of the case. Melech uses Satanus. "Satanas" as a name for Satan appears in some examples of Latin texts popularly associated with satanism and witchcraft, such as the medieval pact with the Devil purportedly written by Urbain Grandier. Both Black Masses end with the Latin expression "Ave, Satanas!"—Meaning either "Welcome, Satan!", or "Hail Satan!" (expressing the opposite sentiments of the similar statement made by Jesus to Satan in the Latin Vulgate Bible (Latin Vulgate, Matthew 4:10), "Vade, Satanas!"—"Go away, Satan!").

== See also ==
- Ave Satani
- Bible desecration
- Black magic
- Host desecration
- Witches' Sabbath
- Satanic ritual abuse
- Satanic panic
- Blood libel
- The Mass of Saint-Sécaire
- Parody Mass
- Requiem Mass (sometimes called a "Black Mass" due to the black vestments the priest wears)
- Solemn Mass (the full sung version of the Latin Mass, which was chosen as the name of one of the first Black Masses, mentioned in this article)
- Gnostic Mass
- The All-Joking, All-Drunken Synod of Fools and Jesters
- Louviers possessions
