= The Human Animal =

The Human Animal may refer to:

- The Human Animal (book), a 1955 book by Weston La Barre
- The Human Animal (TV series), a 1994 BBC nature documentary series and accompanying book
- Human Animal, a 2006 album by Wolf Eyes

== See also ==
- Human
