= Satanism and Witchcraft (book) =

1862 book by Jules Michelet

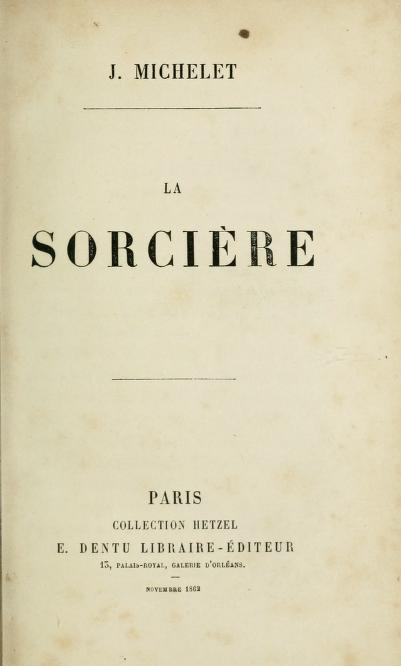
- Author: Jules Michelet
- Original title: La Sorcière
- Language: French
- Subject: Essay, history
- Published: January 1862 (Collection Hetzel; E. Dentu Libraire-Éditeur)
- Publication place: France
- Media type: Print (hardback)
- Pages: 460

Satanism and Witchcraft is a book by Jules Michelet on the history of witchcraft. Originally published in Paris as La Sorcière in 1862, the first English translation appeared in London a year later. Michelet portrays the life of witches and trials held for witchcraft, and argues that medieval witchcraft was a righteous act of rebellion by the lower classes against feudalism and the Roman Catholic Church. Although his book is thought to be largely inaccurate, it is notable for being one of the first sympathetic histories of witchcraft.

== Views ==
According to Michelet, medieval witchcraft was an act of popular rebellion against the oppression of feudalism and the Roman Catholic Church. This rebellion took the form of a secret religion inspired by paganism and belief in fairies, organized by a woman who became its leader. The participants in the religion met regularly at Witches' Sabbaths and Black Masses. Michelet's account dwells on the suffering of peasants and women in the Middle Ages, and writes that history should concentrate on ‘the people, and not only its leaders or its institutions’ put him ahead of his time as a writer of micro-history. Michelet was one of the first people to attempt to give a sociological explanation of the Witch Trials, and interprets the source material very literally.

According to Michelet, in a note added to the end of the book:

The object of my book was purely to give, not a history of Sorcery, but a simple and impressive formula of the Sorceress's way of life, which my learned predecessors darken by the very elaboration of their scientific methods and the excess of detail. My strong point is to start, not from the devil, from an empty conception, but from a living reality, the Sorceress, a warm, breathing reality, rich in results and possibilities.

== Structure ==
The book is divided into two parts, each constituted by twelve chapters. The first and most famous part is an imaginative reconstruction of the experience of a series of medieval witches who led the religion from its original form of social protest into decadence. The second part is a series of episodes in the European witch trials, including the Louis Gaufridi affair, the trials of the possessed women of Loudun and Louviers, and the execution of Charlotte Cadière. Today, the book is regarded as being largely inaccurate, but still notable for being one of the first sympathetic histories of witchcraft, and as such it may have had an indirect influence on Wicca. Michelet uses a mix of scholarly research and imaginative storytelling that makes the book more accessible to readers. The book often reads more like a novel or a tragedy than a typical historical treatise.

== Media ==
In the early 1970s, La Sorcière became the basis for Alain Robbe-Grillet's film Glissements progressifs du plaisir (starring Jean-Louis Trintignant) and the anime film Kanashimi no Belladonna, by Mushi Production.

== See also ==
- Aradia, or the Gospel of the Witches
- Dianic Wicca
