= Martha Brossier =

16th-century French demoniac

- Born: 1556; Romorantin-Lanthenay, France
- Died: after 1600
- Other names: Martha Broissier, Madam Brossier, Marthe Brossier

Martha (or Marthe) Brossier (1556 – after 1600) was a French woman, known for claiming demonic possession at the age of 22. According to Augustin Calmet, Martha was the daughter of a weaver in Romorantin who claimed to have been demonically possessed, drawing considerable notoriety. The case was interpreted as a fraud by Charles Miron, bishop of either the Diocese of Angers or the Diocese of Orléans. (Note: p. 132.)

== Demonic torment ==
The maladies from which she was said to suffer included extreme shortness of breath, an ability to stick out her tongue unreasonably far, and the gnashing of her teeth. She would writhe and move her mouth as if she had convulsions, while contorting her face, rolling her eyes, and appearing to show deep vexation and torment. She would also contort her body parts. A rumbling noise was heard from the area of her spleen under her short ribs on her left side, causing her left thigh to spasm.

She often spoke in a violent and roaring voice. She was recorded to have lain flat on her back and skipped from the altar to the door of a great chapel in four or five lifts, which onlookers described as giving an impression of her being dragged or lifted, presumably by demons. During her demonic fits, she was able to endure pinpricks to her hands and neck with limited bleeding. She was also able to speak with her mouth shut, often speaking English and Greek with apparent fluency.

== Discovery ==
Charles Miron thought that Marthe Brossier's claim that she was possessed was fraudulent. He made her drink holy water under the guise of normal water. He also had the exorcists present her with a key wrapped up in red silk, stating that the silk contained a relic of the True Cross, and recite various verses from Virgil, which she mistook for the rite of exorcism. Both the wrapped key and the lines from Virgil agitated her immensely. Henri de Gondi, Cardinal Bishop of Paris, had her examined by five members of his faculty. Three were of the opinion that she was an impostor with little indication of malady. The Parlement of Paris nominated eleven physicians who all unanimously reported that there was nothing demonic in the matter, (Note: p. 132.) suggesting that she used the physical strength of her stomach and breast to speak with her mouth shut.

== See also ==
- Abraham Hartwell
- Augustin Calmet
- A Guide to Grand-Jury Men
- Margareta i Kumla
- Richard Bernard
- Treatise on the Apparitions of Spirits and on Vampires or Revenants
- Loudun possessions

== Notes ==
- Calmet, Augustin (1751). Treatise on the Apparitions of Spirits and on Vampires or Revenants: of Hungary, Moravia, et al. The Complete Volumes I & II. 2015. CreateSpace Independent Publishing Platform. ISBN 1-5331-4568-7.
- Bernard, Richard (1627). A Guide to Grand-Jury Men: In Modern English. 2017. CreateSpace Independent Publishing Platform. ISBN 1542697077.
