= Jean-François Bladé =

French magistrate, historian, and folklorist

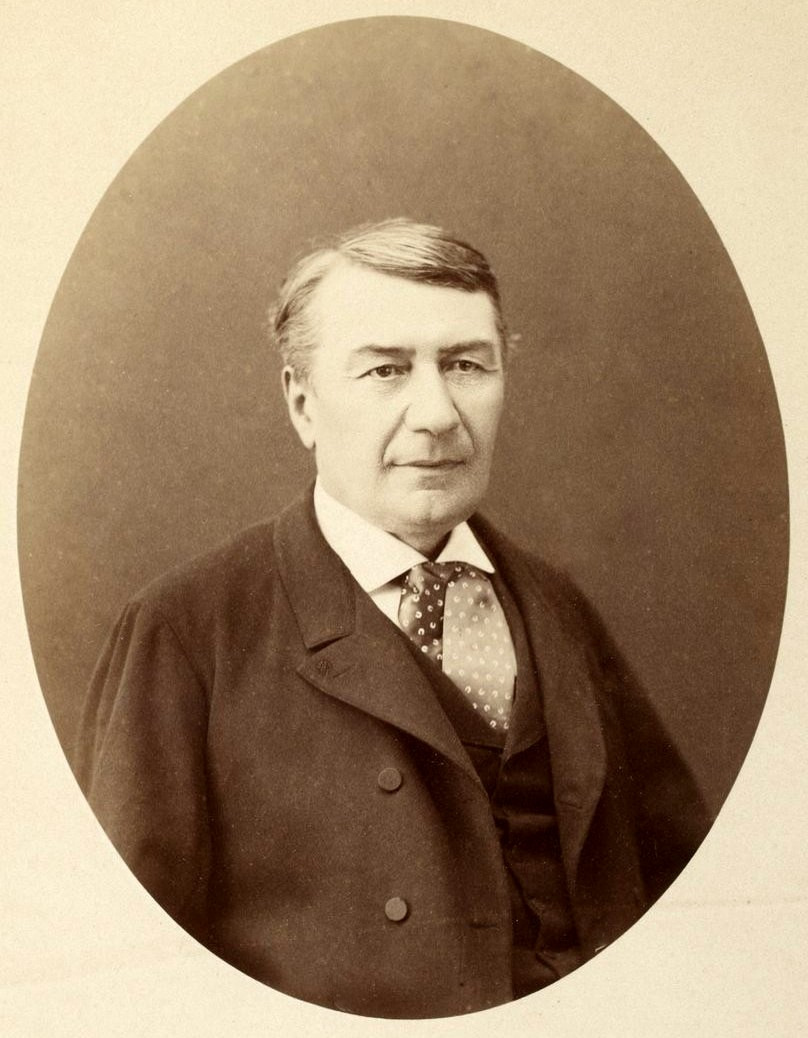
Jean-François Bladé

Jean-François Bladé (1827, Lectoure – 1900) was a French magistrate, historian and folklorist.

He is mainly known for his publication of the oral tradition of Gascony. He is particularly known for publishing an account of the Mass of Saint-Sécaire, used as a source by James Frazer in The Golden Bough.

His best-known work in France is his three-volume Contes populaires de la Gascogne (1886), a collection of folk tales supposedly taken down verbatim from illiterate narrators in the Gascon language, though Bladé provides only a 'translation' into French. A German monograph (M.A. Steinbauer, Das Märchen vom Volksmärchen: Jean-François Bladé..., Frankfurt am M., 1988) has shown, however, that a large proportion of these stories are Bladé's own invention. His information about his oral sources is confused and unconvincing (the chief of them, le vieux Cazaux, appears to be a fictional creation) and much of his collection betrays a nineteenth-century writer much indebted to the European tradition of high literature; 'La Reine châtiée', for example, one of his finest stories, is based on Shakespeare's Hamlet. To this one may add that Bladé's most perfect stories (most notably his wonderful 'Chatiments et vengeances' section in vol. 1) have a highly distinctive style and also a bleak atmosphere that is wholly alien to the spirit of genuine folk tales. Bladé emerges as a forger, but one who deserves recognition as, admittedly within a narrow range, a writer of near genius. But the failure of the stories he published in his own name in his youth, which were too old-fashioned to win favour, led him to present his later fictions as oral folk tales of which he was the mere transcriber.
