= The Golden Bough =

1890 book by James Frazer

- Cover of the first volume of the 1976 Macmillan Press edition
- Author: James George Frazer
- Language: English
- Subject: Comparative religion
- Publisher: Macmillan and Co.
- Publication date: 1890
- Publication place: United Kingdom
- Media type: Print (hardcover and paperback)

The Golden Bough: A Study in Comparative Religion (retitled The Golden Bough: A Study in Magic and Religion in its second edition) is a wide-ranging, comparative study of mythology and religion, written by the Scottish anthropologist James George Frazer.

The Golden Bough was first published in two volumes in 1890; in three volumes in 1900; and in twelve volumes in the third edition, published 1906–1915. It has also been published in several different one-volume abridgments. The work was for a wide literate audience raised on tales as told in such publications as Thomas Bulfinch's The Age of Fable, or Stories of Gods and Heroes (1855). The influence of The Golden Bough on contemporary European literature and thought has been substantial.

== Summary ==
Frazer attempted to define the shared elements of religious belief and scientific thought, discussing fertility rites, human sacrifice, the dying god, the scapegoat, and many other symbols and practices whose influences had extended into 20th-century culture. His thesis is that the most ancient religions were fertility cults that revolved around the worship and periodic sacrifice of a sacred king in accordance with the cycle of the seasons. Frazer proposed that mankind's understanding of the natural world progresses from magic through religious belief to scientific thought. Although highly influential in literature and early anthropology, Frazer's theories are now largely rejected by modern scholars.

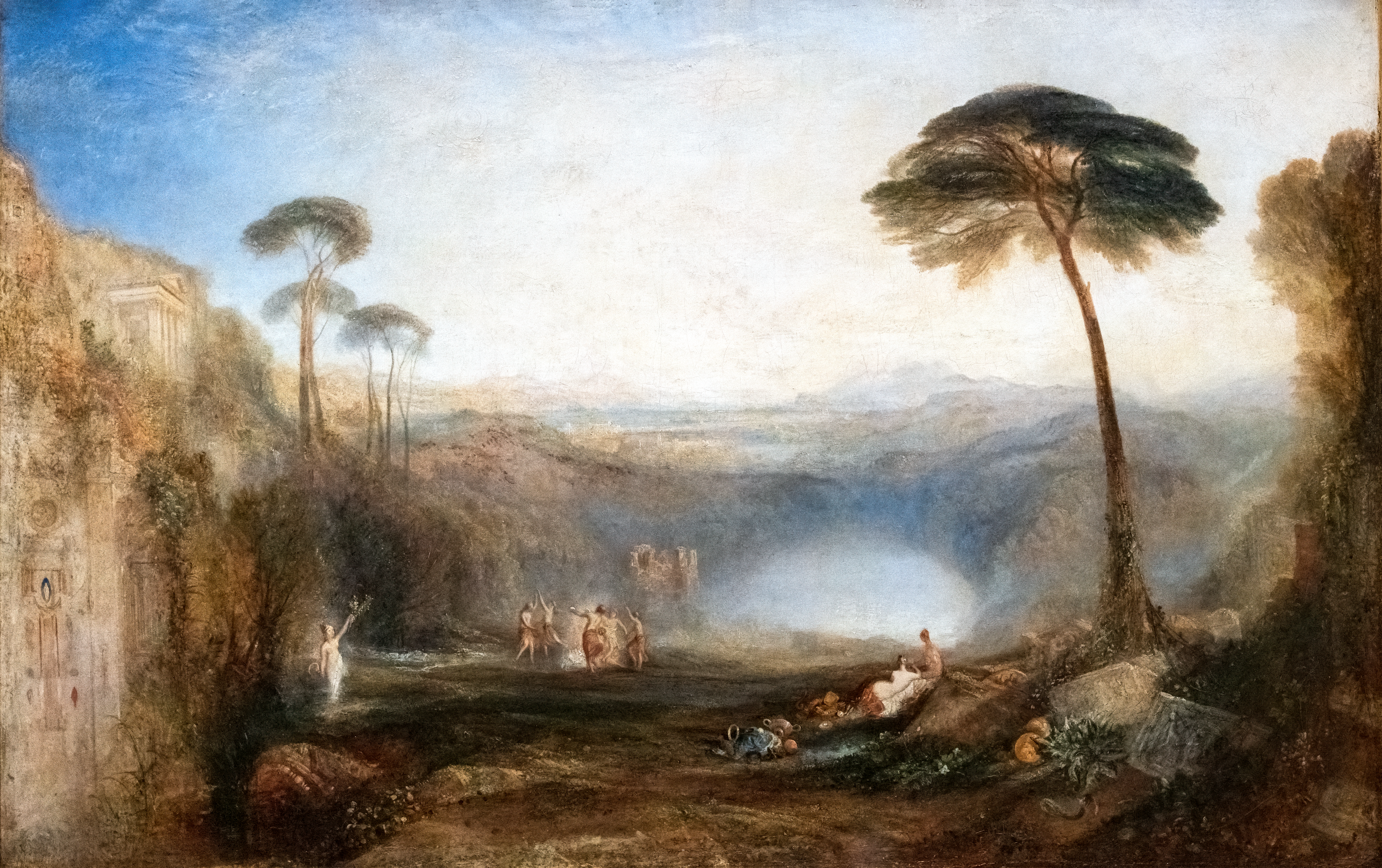
J. M. W. Turner's 1834 painting of the Golden Bough incident in the Aeneid

Frazer's thesis was developed in relation to an episode in Virgil's Aeneid, in which Aeneas and the Sibyl present the golden bough taken from a sacred grove to the gatekeeper of Hades to gain admission. The incident was illustrated by J. M. W. Turner's 1834 painting The Golden Bough. Frazer mistakenly states that the painting depicts the lake at Nemi, though it is actually Lake Avernus. The lake of Nemi, also known as "Diana's Mirror", was a place where religious ceremonies and the "fulfillment of vows" of priests and kings were held.

Frazer based his thesis on the pre-Roman priest-king Rex Nemorensis, a priest of Diana at Lake Nemi, who was ritually murdered by his successor. The king was the incarnation of a dying and reviving god, a solar deity who underwent a mystic marriage to a goddess of the Earth, died at the harvest and was reincarnated in the spring. Frazer claims that this legend of rebirth was central to almost all of the world's mythologies.

Frazer wrote in a preface to the third edition of The Golden Bough that while he had himself never studied Georg Wilhelm Friedrich Hegel, both his friend James Ward and the philosopher J. M. E. McTaggart had suggested to him that Hegel had anticipated his view of "the nature and historical relations of magic and religion". Frazer saw the resemblance as being that "we both hold that in the mental evolution of humanity an age of magic preceded an age of religion, and that the characteristic difference between magic and religion is that, whereas magic aims at controlling nature directly, religion aims at controlling it indirectly through the mediation of a powerful supernatural being or beings to whom man appeals for help and protection." Frazer included an extract from Hegel's Lectures on the Philosophy of Religion (1832).

== Critical reception ==
The Golden Bough scandalized the British public when first published, as it included the Christian story of the resurrection of Jesus in its comparative study. Critics thought this treatment invited an agnostic reading of the Lamb of God as a relic of a pagan religion. For the third edition, Frazer placed his analysis of the Crucifixion in a speculative appendix, while discussion of Christianity was excluded from the single-volume abridged edition.

Frazer himself accepted that his theories were speculative and that the associations he made were circumstantial and usually based only on resemblance. He wrote: "Books like mine, merely speculation, will be superseded sooner or later (the sooner the better for the sake of truth) by better induction based on fuller knowledge." In 1922, at the inauguration of the Frazer Lectureship in Anthropology, he said: "It is my earnest wish that the lectureship should be used solely for the disinterested pursuit of truth, and not for the dissemination and propagation of any theories or opinions of mine." Godfrey Lienhardt notes that even during Frazer's lifetime, social anthropologists "had for the most part distanced themselves from his theories and opinions", and that the lasting influence of The Golden Bough and Frazer's wider body of work "has been in the literary rather than the academic world."

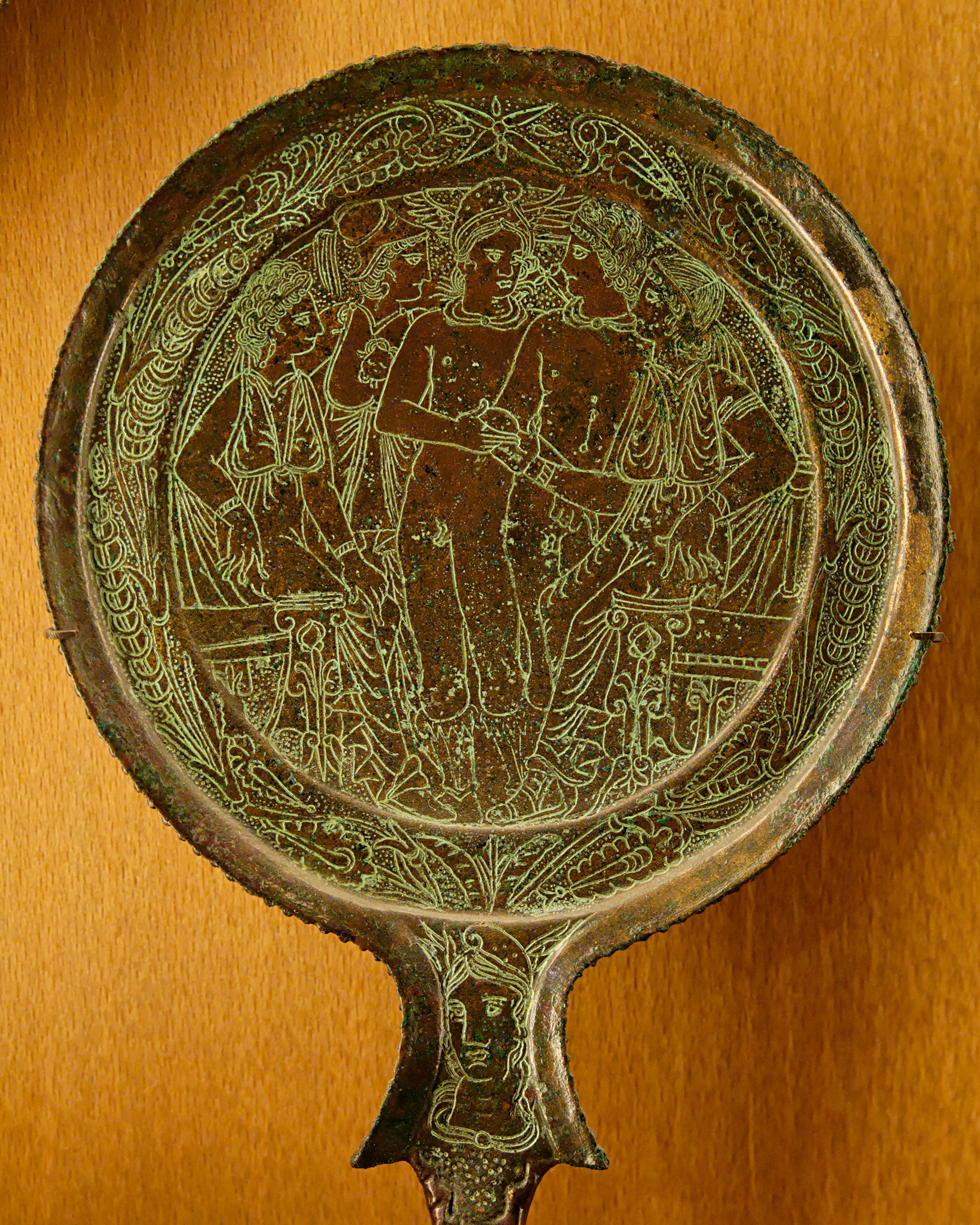
The Judgement of Paris—an Etruscan bronze mirror of the 4th or 3rd century BC that relates the myth as interpreted by Frazer, showing the three goddesses giving their apple or pomegranate to the new king, who must kill the old king

Robert Ackerman writes that, for British social anthropologists, Frazer is still "an embarrassment" for being "the most famous of them all" even as the field now rejects most of his ideas. While The Golden Bough achieved wide "popular appeal" and exerted a "disproportionate" influence "on so many [20th-century] creative writers", Frazer's ideas played "a much smaller part" in the history of academic social anthropology. Lienhardt himself dismissed Frazer's interpretations of primitive religion as "little more than plausible constructs of [Frazer's] own Victorian rationalism", while Ludwig Wittgenstein, in his Remarks on Frazer's Golden Bough (published in 1967), wrote: "Frazer is much more savage than most of his 'savages' [since] his explanations of [their] observances are much cruder than the sense of the observances themselves." R. G. Collingwood shared Wittgenstein's criticism.

Initially, the book's influence on the emerging discipline of anthropology was pervasive. Polish anthropologist Bronisław Malinowski said of The Golden Bough: "No sooner had I read this great work than I became immersed in it and enslaved by it. I realized then that anthropology, as presented by Sir James Frazer, is a great science, worthy of as much devotion as any of her elder and more exact studies, and I became bound to the service of Frazerian anthropology." However, by the 1920s, Frazer's ideas already "began to belong to the past" according to Godfrey Lienhardt, who noted

The central theme (or, as he thought, theory) of The Golden Bough—that all mankind had evolved intellectually and psychologically from a superstitious belief in magicians, through a superstitious belief in priests and gods, to enlightened belief in scientists—had little or no relevance to the conduct of life in an Andamanese camp or a Melanesian village, and the whole, supposedly scientific, basis of Frazer's anthropology was seen as a misapplication of Darwin's theory of biological evolution to human history and psychology.

Edmund Leach, "one of the most impatient critics of Frazer's overblown prose and literary embellishment of his sources for dramatic effect", scathingly criticized what he saw as the artistic license exercised by Frazer in The Golden Bough: "Frazer used his ethnographic evidence, which he culled from here, there and everywhere, to illustrate propositions which he had arrived at in advance by a priori reasoning, but, to a degree which is often quite startling, whenever the evidence did not fit he simply altered the evidence!"

René Girard, a French historian, literary critic, and philosopher of social science, "grudgingly" praised Frazer for recognising kingly sacrifice as "a key primitive ritual", but described his interpretation of the ritual as "a grave injustice to ethnology." Girard's criticisms of The Golden Bough were numerous, particularly concerning Frazer's assertion that Christianity was merely a perpetuation of primitive myth-ritualism and that the New Testament Gospels were "just further myths of the death and resurrection of the king who embodies the god of vegetation." Girard himself considered the Gospels to be "revelatory texts" rather than myths or the remains of "ignorant superstition", and rejected Frazer's idea that the death of Jesus was a sacrifice, "whatever definition we may give for that sacrifice."

== Literary influence ==
Despite the controversy generated by the work, and its critical reception amongst other scholars, The Golden Bough inspired much of the creative literature of the period. The poet Robert Graves adapted Frazer's concept of the dying king sacrificed for the good of the kingdom to the romantic idea of the poet's suffering for the sake of his Muse-Goddess, as reflected in his book on poetry, rituals, and myths, The White Goddess (1948). William Butler Yeats refers to Frazer's thesis in his poem "Sailing to Byzantium". The horror writer H. P. Lovecraft's understanding of religion was influenced by The Golden Bough, and Lovecraft mentions the book in his short story "The Call of Cthulhu". T. S. Eliot acknowledged indebtedness to Frazer in his first note to his poem The Waste Land. William Carlos Williams refers to The Golden Bough in Book Two, part two, of Paterson. Frazer also influenced novelists James Joyce, Ernest Hemingway, William Gaddis and D. H. Lawrence.

The lyrics of the song "Not to Touch the Earth" by the Doors were influenced by The Golden Bough, with the title and opening lines being taken from its table of contents. Francis Ford Coppola's film Apocalypse Now shows the antagonist Kurtz with the book in his lair, and his death is depicted as a ritual sacrifice.

The mythologist Joseph Campbell drew on The Golden Bough in The Hero with a Thousand Faces (1949), in which he accepted Frazer's view that mythology is a primitive attempt to explain the world of nature, though considering it only one among a number of valid explanations of mythology. Campbell later described Frazer's work as "monumental". The anthropologist Weston La Barre described Frazer as "the last of the scholastics" in The Human Animal (1955). The philosopher Ludwig Wittgenstein's commentaries on The Golden Bough have been compiled as Remarks on Frazer's Golden Bough, edited by Rush Rhees, originally published in 1967 (the English edition followed in 1979). Robert Ackerman, in his The Myth and Ritual School: J. G. Frazer and the Cambridge Ritualists (1991), sets Frazer in the broader context of the history of ideas. The myth and ritual school includes scholars Jane Harrison, Gilbert Murray, F. M. Cornford, and A. B. Cook, who were connecting the new discipline of myth theory and anthropology with traditional literary classics at the end of the 19th century, influencing Modernist literature. The Golden Bough influenced Sigmund Freud's work Totem and Taboo (1913), as well as the work of Freud's student Carl Jung.

The critic Camille Paglia has identified The Golden Bough as one of the most important influences on her book Sexual Personae (1990). In Sexual Personae, Paglia described Frazer's "most brilliant perception" in The Golden Bough as his "analogy between Jesus and the dying gods", though she noted that it was "muted by prudence". In Salon, she has described the work as "a model of intriguing specificity wed to speculative imagination." Paglia acknowledged that "many details in Frazer have been contradicted or superseded", but maintained that the work of Frazer's Cambridge school of classical anthropology "will remain inspirational for enterprising students seeking escape from today's sterile academic climate." Paglia has also commented, however, that the one-volume abridgement of The Golden Bough is "bland" and should be "avoided like the plague."

== Publication history ==
=== Editions ===
- First edition, 2 vols., 1890. (Vol. I, II)
- Second edition, 3 vols., 1900. (Vol. I, II, III)
- Third edition, 12 vols., 1906–15.
  - Volume 1 (1911): The Magic Art and the Evolution of Kings (Part 1)
  - Volume 2 (1911): The Magic Art and the Evolution of Kings (Part 2)
  - Volume 3 (1911): Taboo and the Perils of the Soul
  - Volume 4 (1911): The Dying God
  - Volume 5 (1914): Adonis, Attis, Osiris (Part 1) – First edition published in 1906 and Second edition in 1907
  - Volume 6 (1914): Adonis, Attis, Osiris (Part 2) – First edition published in 1906 and Second edition in 1907
  - Volume 7 (1912): Spirits of the Corn and of the Wild (Part 1)
  - Volume 8 (1912): Spirits of the Corn and of the Wild (Part 2)
  - Volume 9 (1913): The Scapegoat
  - Volume 10 (1913): Balder the Beautiful (Part 1)
  - Volume 11 (1913): Balder the Beautiful (Part 2)
  - Volume 12 (1915): Bibliography and General Index

=== Supplement ===
- 1936: Aftermath: A Supplement to the Golden Bough

=== Reprints ===
- Entire third edition, including Aftermath, was reprinted in 13 volumes by the Macmillan Press in 1951, 1955, 1963, 1966, 1976 and 1980. ISBN 0-333-01282-8

=== Abridged editions ===
- Abridged edition, 1 vol., 1922. This edition excludes Frazer's references to Christianity.
  - 1995 Touchstone edition, ISBN 0-684-82630-5
  - 2002 Dover reprint of 1922 edition, ISBN 0-486-42492-8
- Abridged edition. 1925 print. The Macmillan Company. Available for free.
- Abridged edition, edited by Theodor H. Gaster, 1959, entitled The New Golden Bough: A New Abridgment of the Classic Work.
- Abridged edition, edited by Mary Douglas and abridged by Sabine MacCormack, 1978, entitled The Illustrated Golden Bough. ISBN 0-385-14515-2
- Abridged edition, paperback version by the Macmillan Press in 1987, 756 p. Reprinted in 1990, 772 pages. ISBN 0-333-52198-6
- Abridged edition, edited by Robert Fraser for Oxford University Press, 1994. It restores the material on Christianity purged in the first abridgement. ISBN 0-19-282934-3
- Abridged edition, abridged by Robert K. G. Temple for Simon & Schuster, 1996, entitled The Illustrated Golden Bough; A Study in Magic and Religion. Another illustrated abridgement. ISBN 0-684-81850-7

=== Free Online text ===
- The 1922 edition of The Golden Bough on the Internet Sacred Text Archive
- The 1894 version on the Internet Archive
- The 1925 (abridged) version on the Internet Archive

== See also ==
- Archetypal literary criticism
- The Golden Bough (mythology)
- The Mass of Saint-Sécaire
- Need-fire
- Rex Nemorensis
- Seclusion of girls at puberty
