= Traité sur les apparitions des esprits et sur les vampires ou les revenans de Hongrie, de Moravie, &c. =

18th century 2-volume book by Augustin Calmet

Treatise on the Apparitions of Spirits and on Vampires or Revenants of Hungary, Moravia, et al.
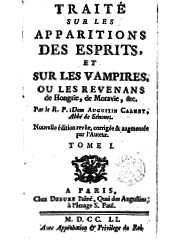
- Title page of the first tome.
- Author: Abbot R.P. Dom Augustin Calmet
- Language: French with translations in German, Italian and English
- Series: 2 Volumes (tomes)
- Genre: Occult, Religion, Theology, History, Dissertation
- Publication date: 1751
- Publication place: France
- Media type: Print
- Preceded by: Dissertations sur les apparitions des anges, des démons et des esprits, et sur les revenants et vampires de Hongrie, de Bohême, de Moravie et de Silésie (1746)

Traité sur les apparitions des esprits et sur les vampires ou les revenans de Hongrie, de Moravie, &c. (Treatise on the Apparitions of Spirits and on Vampires or Revenants of Hungary, Moravia, et al.) is one of the many works by an Abbot monk named Antoine Augustin Calmet, an exegete and an 18th-century Lorraine scholar of the Benedictine Order; also known as Dom Calmet. The work was published in 2 volumes that dealt with the extensive investigation into occult matters regarding the apparitions of angels, demons and other spirits.

It included dissertations on various topics of magic, sorcery, witchcraft and instances of vampires, revenants and individuals returning from the grave. This study analyzed accounts of these various topics located in the Bible, mythology, cultural legends and famous accounts of historically documented cases or claims.

== History ==
The work was first published in 1746 under the title Dissertations sur les apparitions des anges, des démons et des esprits, et sur les revenants et vampires de Hongrie, de Bohême, de Moravie et de Silésie. After a great deal of praise and response from his readers, the work was expanded and published with Privilege of the King of France in 1751 under the new title Traité sur les apparitions des esprits et sur les vampires ou les revenans de Hongrie, de Moravie, &c.. The new version included letters and dissertations by some of his readers and extra chapters as a response to refutations and various claims.

=== Publication history ===
- 1746 Dissertations sur les apparitions des anges, des démons et des esprits, et sur les revenants et vampires de Hongrie, de Bohême, de Moravie et de Silésie

(Dissertations on the apparitions of angels, of demons, and spirits and on Revenants or vampires of Hungary, Bohemia, Moravia and Silesia)

- 1751 Traité sur les apparitions des esprits et sur les vampires ou les revenans de Hongrie, de Moravie, &c.

(Treatise on the apparitions of Spirits and on Vampires or Revenants of Hungary, Moravia, etc.)

== Structure ==
The total work consists of 115 chapters contained in two volumes. The dissertation is divided into four parts. In the first, Calmet speaks of good angels. In the second, of the appearance of bad angels. In the third, of the apparitions of souls of the dead. In the fourth, of the appearance of living men to others living, absent, distant, and this unknown to those who appear, occasionally adding research on magic, wizards, and witches, on the Sabbath, oracles, and the obsession and possession by demons throughout the volumes.

He used a scientific approach when looking into pre-modern cases of witchcraft, vampires, superstitious beliefs and various other topics of the occult. He delved into the use of the scientific method, biology, psychology, chemistry, etymology and investigated the history of various legends of folklore to determine whether a claim of hauntings, apparitions or magic were truth or fraud.

=== Tome 1 ===
The treatise as a whole consists of extensive research across a wide range of topics. The first tome contains 52 chapters and mostly deals with the apparitions of spirits, angels and demons while also covering the study of magic, sorcery and witchcraft. Topics also include:

- Angelic and demonic intervention
- The history, reality and mythology of magic; divination; curses
- Understanding the difference between real accounts vs that of impostors
- Examples and instances of real possessions caused by the devil
- The power and authority which Satan and demons possess
- False prophets and predictions of happenstance
- The appearance and examinations of specters and pretended specters
- Examinations on Specters that haunt houses
- The dead who return to the earth
- Explanations and objections on the instances of apparitions;
- The studies on Familiars; Elves
- The secrets of physics and chemistry or Alchemy taken as supernatural things

=== Tome 2 ===
The second tome consists of 63 chapters and includes a series of letters thereafter. The study includes:

- Resurrection of the dead
- Instances of people returning from the grave
- Examination to people being buried alive but thought to be dead
- Historical accounts of revenants, ghosts and vampires
- The study of vampires, ghosts in classical mythology and religions
- Historically recorded accounts of vampires between the 17th and 18th centuries
- Examinations on bodies that do not decay and corpses that show life after death
- The power of demons to kill and restore life
- On the return of the excommunicated
- Instances of bodies that devour their own flesh
- Instances on exhumed bodies and their examinations
- Analysis on whether vampires or revenants are truly dead
- Instances of people returning from the grave months after declared deceased.

=== Letters ===
Included in the printing of the second tome were many letters. Some were of approbation but also contained in this collection was a letter written by Marquis of Maffei that was of itself a selected dissertation on magical studies that was written in 16 chapters.

== Themes ==
=== Demonic possession ===
Calmet, doubtful of the circumstances involved in the Loudun Possessions, made a detailed comparison to other cases he believed were truer to the principal symptoms of demonic possession.

==== Mademoiselle Elizabeth de Ranfaing ====
Calmet researched a judicial case that described the possession of Elizabeth de Ranfaing, who having become a widow in 1617, was later sought in marriage by a physician (afterwards burned under judicial sentence for being a practicing magician). After being rejected, he gave her philters to make her love him which occasioned strange developments in her health and proceeded to continuously give her some other forms of medicament. The maladies which she suffered were incurable by the various physicians that attended her and eventually led to a recourse of exorcisms as prescribed by several physicians that examined her case. (Note: p. 138-143.)

They began to exorcise her in September, 1619. During the exorcisms, the demon that possessed her made detailed and fluid responses in varying languages including French, Greek, Latin, Hebrew and Italian and was reportedly able to know and recite the thoughts and sins of various individuals who examined her. She was further also able to describe in detail with the use of various languages the rites and secrets of the church to experts in the languages she spoke. There was even a mention of how the demon interrupted an exorcist, who after making a mistake in his recital of an exorcism rite in Latin, corrected his speech and mocked him.

=== Vampirism ===
Calmet describes the vampire as a "revenant corpse" thus distinguishable from intangible ghosts such as phantoms or spirits. He conducted a synthesis of studies on the subject and considers that vampirism is the result of undernourished Balkan. As Calmet amassed numerous reports on events of vampires, his attempt to refute false claims of vampirism proved difficult:

[T]hey see, it is said, men who have been dead for several months, come back to earth, talk, walk, infest villages, ill use both men and beasts, suck the blood of their near relations, make them ill, and finally cause their death; so that people can only save themselves from their dangerous visits and their hauntings by exhuming them, impaling them, cutting off their heads, tearing out the heart, or burning them. These revenants are called by the name of oupires or vampires, that is to say, leeches; and such particulars are related of them, so singular, so detailed, and invested with such probable circumstances and such judicial information, that one can hardly refuse to credit the belief which is held in those countries, that these revenants come out of their tombs and produce those effects which are proclaimed of them. (Note: p. 303-304)

Calmet analyzed many famous cases including that of Arnold Paole. Calmet also investigated the Lettres juives in which an account of a vampire had been recorded in 1732 Hungary, witnessed by officers of the tribunal of Belgrade and an officer to the emperor's troops at Graditz. Although the letters were published as an epistolary novel, it was widely believed to be accurate and true records by the populace at the time.

Also investigated were various judicial cases of dead persons reported as returning from the grave to attack and suck the blood of the living. One such case was in 1730 of a soldier lodged at the house of a peasant in Hungary. As the soldier sat with the homeowner and the rest of the company at the table for dinner, a person he did not know came into the home and quietly sat at the table with them. The homeowner appeared frightened and was discovered deceased the next day. After inquiry, the soldier learned that the father of the homeowner had died and was buried 10 years before and the family believed the man who came the previous night was the father's body. (Note: p. 329)

The soldier informed the regiment, giving notice to the general officers who commissioned the captain of the infantry to further investigate. The captain, accompanied by other officers, a surgeon, and an auditor, took down depositions from the family, who confirmed the soldier's report, and also from all the residents of the village. The corpse of the father was ordered to be exhumed and was found to appear recently deceased, but with the blood-flow of a living man. The Count de Cabreras ordered the corpse's head to be cut off and the body reinterred in his tomb.

The count also received information of another man, dead for more than thirty years, who was reported by his family to have come back to his house on three separate occasions during meal time. On the first he had sucked the blood from the neck of his brother, the second time from one of his sons, and the third from one of the servants in the house, all three of which had died immediately after. In response to this information, the commissary took the suspected corpse from the grave, finding it to be like the first corpse discovered with a living blood-flow, and he ordered the temple to be pierced with a large nail, before returning the body to the grave. (Note: p. 330)

== Reactions and scholarly criticism ==
Calmet's treatise was awarded numerous approbations and letters of criticism following his first publication in 1746, many of which were included in its republication and expanded 1751 version that included new chapters to answer his audience.

The treatise received 'Approbation of the King' to the 7th Register on the registry of The Chamber of Royal Booksellers and Printers to Paris on 9 June 1751. (Note: p. 579-580)

He is mentioned by Voltaire who in his Dictionnaire philosophique explains:

Calmet became their historian, and treated vampires as he treated the Old and New Testament, reporting faithfully all that had been said before him

== Cultural impact ==
Calmet analyzed a report that was written from a priest who had heard reports of a town being tormented by a vampiric entity three years earlier. After having traveled to the town to investigate and collect information of the various inhabitants there, the priest was told that a vampire had tormented many of the inhabitants at night by coming out from the nearby cemetery to haunt many of the residents at their beds.

It is reported that an unknown Hungarian traveler came to the town during this time and helped the town by setting a trap at the cemetery which ultimately led to the decapitation of the vampire that resided there and curing the town of their torment. This story was retold by Sheridan Le Fanu and adapted into the thirteenth chapter of the novella Carmilla, a work that heavily inspired Bram Stoker's classic Dracula.

== See also ==
- Angelology
- Classification of demons
- Demonology
- Hierarchy of angels
- Martha Broissier
- Paranormal
- Undead

== Notes ==
- Claude, LeCouteux (1999). Historie des Vampires: Autopsie d'un mythe (History of Vampires: Anatomy of a Myth). Imago. p. 195. ISBN 978-2-911416-29-3.
- Marigny, Jean (July 1990). Sang pour Sang, Le Reveil des Vampires (Blood for Blood, The Vampire Awakening). Scarborough House Publishers. ISBN 0-8128-8511-2.
- Calmet, Augustin (1751). Treatise on the Apparitions of Spirits and on Vampires or Revenants: of Hungary, Moravia, et al. The Complete Volumes I & II. 2015. CreateSpace Independent Publishing Platform. ISBN 1-5331-4568-7.
