= The Mass of Saint-Sécaire =

The Mass of Saint-Sécaire (Occitan: Massa de Sant-Secaire) is a ritual supposed to have been performed in Gascony, France. The best-known account of the Mass is that of James George Frazer in his 1890 omnibus The Golden Bough; Frazer's description, in turn, was taken nearly verbatim from a less well-known French book published in 1883, Quatorze superstitions populaires de la Gascogne ("Fourteen Popular Superstitions of Gascony"), by Jean-François Bladé.

The ritual was a form of Black Mass, a parody of the Roman Catholic Mass, and is notable for its unusual parody of the Eucharist as compared to other accounts of Black Masses. It was said to be employed as a method by which a wronged party could supernaturally avenge himself. Bladé's informant indicated that fear of the Mass was still prevalent at the time of their interview.

== Description ==
According to the recorded account, the Mass could only be said in a ruined or deserted church. At precisely the first stroke of 11 o'clock the corrupt priest, with only his lover as attendant, would begin to recite the Mass backwards, being sure to finish at precisely the last stroke of midnight. Among other details intended to parody the normal practice of the Mass, the host used would be triangular and black, rather than round and white; the priest would not consecrate wine but instead drink water from a well into which an unbaptized infant had been thrown. Bladé's informant also reported that the sign of the cross would be made by the priest with his left foot on the ground before him. At the very end the officiant would pronounce the name of a victim who, it was believed, would soon simply waste away and die, with no cause that could be understood by medicine.

Aleister Crowley wrote a short story about the Mass, entitled The Mass of Saint-Sécaire, in his Golden Bough-inspired series Golden Twigs. First published in February 1918 in The International, it uses a working of the Mass of Saint-Sécaire to illustrate an aspect of Crowley's theory of magical effects. The Mass is also used as the basis of the CBS Radio Mystery Theater episode The Secret Doctrine (first aired June 20, 1974).
