= A Guide to Grand-Jury Men =

Book by Richard Bernard

A Gvide to Grand-Jury Men
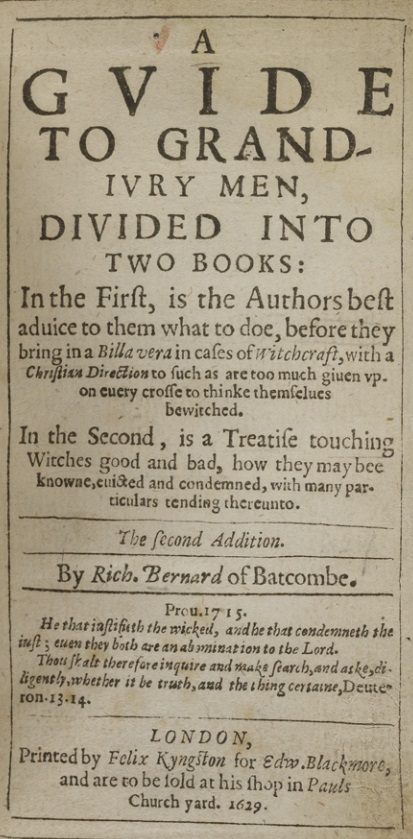
- Cover page of the second edition
- Author: Richard Bernard
- Language: Early Modern English English
- Series: 2 books in one volume
- Genre: Occult, Religion, Philosophy, Dissertation, Legal treatise
- Publication date: First Edition: 1627; Second Edition: 1629
- Publication place: England
- Media type: Print

A Guide to Grand-Jury Men (Note: Full title: A Guide to Grand-Jury Men, Divided into Two Books: In the First, is the Authors best advice to them what to doe, before they bring in a Billa vera in cases of witchcraft, with a Christian Direction to such as are too much given upon every crosse to thinke themselves bewitched. In the Second, is a Treatise touching Witches good and bad, how they may bee knowne, evicted and condemned, with many particulars tending thereunto.) was first published in 1627 and written by a puritan clergyman named Richard Bernard.

The work is a collection of two dissertations on the legal aspects of witchcraft and how those participating in the trials may be deceived by deceit and counterfeited accounts. It further elaborates on how many natural ills can be taken as bewitchment. Bernard gives advice on how to determine an actual account of witchcraft from that of a false accusation and even more, the signs one should seek to determine if a man is truly bewitched or suffering from a natural sickness.

The dissertation was written to help reform the laws on witchcraft, to educate the men commissioned to seek out, investigate and prosecute instances of witchcraft, and as a guide to witchfinding with a combination of scientific analysis and theological understanding that was not previously used. Previously, the Justices of Peace did not always expect direct evidence, and seeing that the works of witches were works of darkness, there were often no witnesses present with them to accuse them.

== Book one ==
The first book covers a wide range of topics but focuses on some key points. The first is the scientific aspect to witchcraft. That strange diseases can happen to both men and animals that are neither inflicted by devils or witches. There were many who were falsely accused of witchcraft based on their natural ailments, but it was Richard Bernard's belief that men were also able to counterfeit various claims of bewitchment for their own financial, social or political purpose and that if the devil were involved, he could work without the consent or association of a witch.

== Book two ==
The second book delves into the study of demonology and the theology of witchcraft, and works to prove through theological study what witches are real and how a witch is said to enlist a spirit to conduct mischief and bewitch others. (Note: p. 115.) Bernard explains the behavioral characteristics of an individual most likely to become a witch and how the Devil solicits an individual and prepares them to partake in the practices of witchcraft and deceit.

Bernard felt that a person who goes to a witch, wizard, or blesser for assistance is just as guilty of witchcraft in the biblical perspective. There are also elaborations on the following topics:

- The sealing and confirmation of a contract with the devil and the various kinds of individuals that may establish such a pact
- The shapes and appearances which Satan may take
- How a Christian may be overtaken and yielded by witchcraft
- The differences between a good witch and a bad witch
- The various occupations a witch may take
- That many rituals and preparations must be made before anything can be bewitched
- The manner and methods of examining a witch
- The difficulties in discovering a witch and the causes of those difficulties
- The political reasons for executing witches
- How trials of bad witches should be conducted and rules for the persecution, conviction and condemnation of witches in the course of justice.

== See also ==
- Martha Brossier
- Daemonologie
- Necromancy
- Witch-hunt
