= Magdelaine Bavent =

French nun condemned for witchcraft (1602-1652)

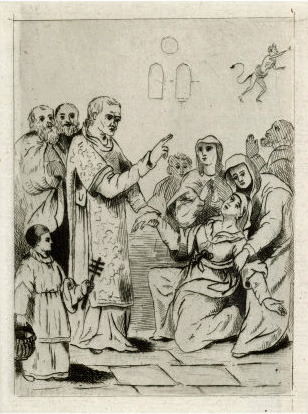
- Bavent's alleged demonic possession in 1647, which led to her conviction.
- Born: November 1602; Rouen, (Saint-Pierre-l'Honoré), France
- Died: October 1652 (aged 49); Rouen, France
- Occupation: Nun
- Known for: Conviction for witchcraft, Louviers possessions

Magdelaine Bavent also spelled Madelaine Bavent, (1602–1652) was an orphaned French child and nun who lived in several convents, where she was repeatedly assaulted, including a convent in Louviers. She was one of the prominent women accused of witchcraft at the convent. After her conviction of demonic possession in 1647, she was sentenced to life imprisonment. She died at 49 in the Rouen prison.

== Biography ==
Bavent was born in Rouen (Saint-Pierre-l'Honoré), France. According to her baptismal certificate, she received the sacrament on 17 November 1602, which places her birth in the previous days. When she was orphaned at the age of 9, she was sent to her uncle Léon Sadoc, an important figure in the town, who placed her with a seamstress. While working there, she met a Franciscan friar. According to the historian Jules Michelet, the shop was located near a church where a priest "reigned supreme" and "made the apprentices, (probably intoxicated by atropa belladonna [deadly nightshade] and other witches' brews) believe that he was leading them to the sabbath and marrying them to the devil Dagon." Beginning at the age of 14, Bavent was the victim of repeated sexual assaults by the friar who was finally expelled from his order because of his actions.

In 1623, at 21, Bavent entered the newly founded Saint-Louis-Sainte-Élisabeth convent as a novice. Around 1628, she became a turn-maid, the person who tends to the convent's turning wheel in the wall through which the nuns could exchange messages and goods with people outside while remaining unseen.

She received a somewhat strange teaching from the house director named Pierre David, an Adamite, who preached that participants should be nude during religious ceremonies, saying "that it was necessary to put sin to death, to return to innocence, and resemble our first parents, who were completely unashamed of their nudity..." The nudity led to sexual activity among the participants.

After his death, David was succeeded by Mathurin Le Picard in 1628 who continued the practices of his predecessor. As a result of her treatment, Madeleine became pregnant, perhaps several times. Because Picard feared that Bavent would denounce him to another priest, he forced her to sign a will in which she "promised to die when he died and to be where he was."

== The Louviers possessed ==
The story called the "Louviers possessions" concerns numerous diabolical practices carried out in the convent's chapel by Picard, the vicar Thomas Boulle, and women from the Louviers convent, including Bavent herself.

An ensuing investigation by the French queen found that many nuns had been assaulted and noted that: "Their confessions were accompanied by what investigators believed to be classic signs of demonic possession at the time: contortions, unnatural bodily movements, speaking in tongues (glossolalia), obscene language and blasphemy."

The Louviers affair escalated around 1643 when Bavent and other sisters were threatened with being burned at the stake for demonic possession. Bavent was initially taken to the prison of Évreux, then, following the death of her confessor, Bishop of Évreux, François de Péricard, she was sent to the prison of Rouen where she died in October 1652 while serving a life sentence. For their atrocities, some of the perpetrators were punished: Thomas Boulle was burned at the stake and Mathurin Picard’s body was exhumed and burned.
