= Remarks on Frazer's Golden Bough =

Commentary written by Ludwig Wittgenstein in 1931

Remarks on Frazer's Golden Bough (German: Bemerkungen über Frazers "The Golden Bough") is a collection of Ludwig Wittgenstein's comments on James George Frazer's The Golden Bough, an early work of comparative mythology. The commentary was initially published posthumously in 1967, with an English edition in 1979. Wittgenstein wrote the text in the summer of 1931. It represented his earliest efforts to compose what became the philosophy of his Philosophical Investigations (1953). An important theme of the Remarks, and one which Wittgenstein later explored more fully, is the conception of metaphysics as a "kind of magic".

Editor Rush Rhees published the text separately from Wittgenstein's other work in a possible attempt to avoid alienating Wittgenstein's readership, in light of the sympathy shown to "primitive" thought and practices. In the Remarks, Wittgenstein describes Frazer as more savage than those he studied, and is exceptionally critical of Frazer's interpretations of primitive mythology, Christianity, and epistemology.

The remarks were later included in full in an anthology of Wittgenstein's work entitled Philosophical Occasions 1912-1951. The editors claim that Rhees omitted a number of remarks from the bilingual book edition of the Remarks, and include in their anthology some remarks they believe Rhees may have erroneously excluded.
