= Jewish Letters =

Book by Jean-Baptiste Boyer, Marquis d'Argens

Lettres juives
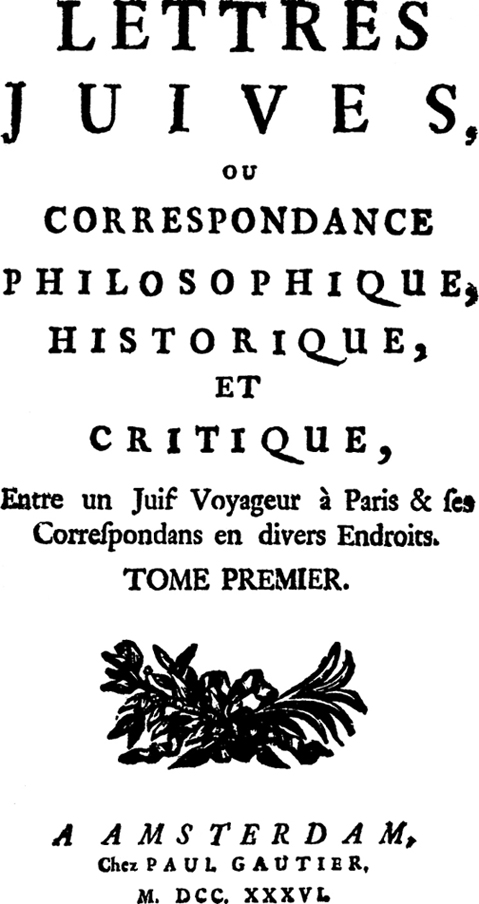
- Editor: Paul Gautier, Amsterdam
- Author: Jean-Baptiste de Boyer, Marquis d'Argens
- Language: French, with translations in English, German and Dutch
- Series: 30 volumes
- Genre: Epistolary novel, philosophy
- Publication date: 1738
- Publication place: France
- Media type: Print

The Jewish Letters; or, Philosophical, Historical and Critical Correspondence Between a Jew Traveler in Paris and His Correspondents in Various Places (French: Lettres juives; 1738–1742) is an epistolary novel attributed to Jean-Baptiste de Boyer, Marquis d'Argens. It "purports to be a translation of the correspondence between five distinguished rabbis who reside in different cities. ... The book comprises a survey of the various governments of Europe at whose several capitals these Jewish rabbis reside either permanently or temporarily during their travels. ... Though Marquis d'Argens signs himself as the translator, he is doubtless the author."

== Content ==
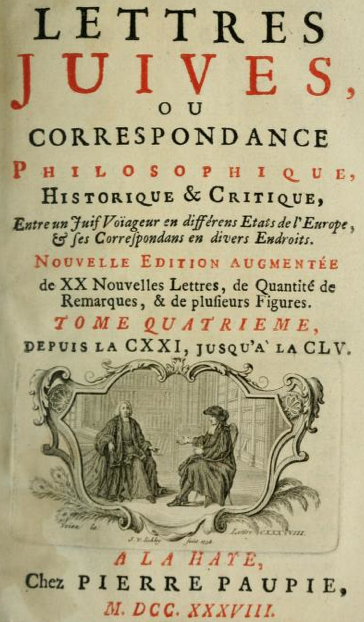
Lettres Juives v.4 (The Hague: Pierre Paupie, 1738)

The Jewish Letters consist of a correspondence of two hundred letters between Aaron Monceca, visiting France; Jacob Brito of Genoa; and Isaac Onis, rabbi of Constantinople. Most of the letters are sent by Aaron Monceca to Isaac Onis.

The role played by the Persian Letters of Charles de Secondat, baron de Montesquieu in the composition of the Jewish Letters is undeniable. Montesquieu had put this literary form into fashion in 1721. The Jewish Letters of Boyer d'Argens are certainly an imitation, but not a plagiarism of the Persian Letters, for we already perceive in the first the Spirit of the laws in germ. In the latter, it is more of the philosophy of common sense that it is question and the skepticism spread there by Boyer d'Argens throughout the work more akin, and far, to the spirit of a Bayle than of Montesquieu.

The Jewish Letters were inspired by a trip to Turkey made by Boyer d'Argens in the company of Audrezel's French ambassador, a friend of his father: he met a Jewish physician named Fonseca (whose name resembles that of one of his correspondents in the Jewish Letters, Aaron Monceca), a priest in Spain, but who remained secretly faithful to Judaism, and who for fear of the Holy Office, to whom he was not without some suspicious reason, refugee in Constantinople. He declared to the French traveler that he had wished to examine the religion which had been taken from him; that he had found things which seemed absurd to him; and that he did not take the trouble to examine the others, that he knew how to differ only in certain points.

== Reception ==
In these letters, Boyer d'Argens does not equal his model, but he expresses the intellectual freedom and freedom of thought that particularly appealed to readers of the Enlightenment. The Jewish Letters were well received and brought their author lasting fame. They attracted the attention of Voltaire and Frederick II, who gave him the nickname "Brother Isaac".

He "began publishing the letters in serial form, two per week, in December 1735. Twenty months, 180 letters, and over 350,000 words later, he had completed his monumental work. Meanwhile, his publisher had begun selling the letters in volumes of 30 and by the end of 1737 had produced 6 volumes in octavo. By the end of 1739 at least 10 editions, most of them pirated, had been published in French. ... Numerous translations of the novel also appeared in English, German and Dutch." "The prolific d'Argens was enormously popular in his day and was best known for this novel."

This work was most likely believed to contain true accounts by the populace at the time leading Augustin Calmet to be critical of the work through his investigation into varying accounts of Magic and vampirism. As such, Calmet analyzed the Jewish Letters, he came across the 131st letter and wrote about it in his Treatise on the apparitions of Spirits and on Vampires or Revenants, in which an account of vampirism was recorded and the judicial process in the vanquishing of the vampire was elaborately described; Calmet disagreed.

== See also ==
- Treatise on the Apparition of Spirits and on Vampires or Revenants
