= Weston La Barre =

American anthropologist (1911-1996)

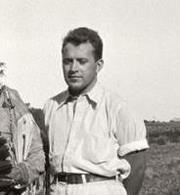
- La Barre in 1954
- Born: 13 December 1911; Uniontown, Pennsylvania, U.S.
- Died: 13 March 1996 (aged 84); Chapel Hill, North Carolina, U.S.

Raoul Weston La Barre (1911–1996) was an American anthropologist, best known for his work in ethnobotany, particularly with regard to Native-American religion, and for his application of psychiatric and psychoanalytic theories to ethnography.

== Education and early career ==
La Barre was born in Uniontown, Pennsylvania, the son of a banker. After graduating from Princeton University in 1933 he began field work with the Yale Institute of Human Relations. During this period, La Barre worked with one of his lifelong academic associates, Richard Evans Schultes of Harvard University. Travelling and sleeping in Schultes' old car, they traveled extensively throughout Oklahoma on their quest to study the peyote cult of the Plains Indians. La Barre received his doctorate from Yale in 1937 with a thesis on peyote religion. In a 1961 article, La Barre wrote that "It was [La Barre's teacher at Yale] Edward Sapir, more than any other person, who first effectively imported psychoanalysis into the body of American anthropology...At a time when the official anthropological journals were systematically ignoring psychoanalysis and the prevailing climate of opinion was chilly if not hostile, Sapir was giving his students as required reading the works of Abraham, Jones, Ferenczi and other classic writers." In the 1970s, La Barre taught those same classic psychoanalytic works to Duke medical students.

In 1937 La Barre was made a Sterling Fellow at Yale, and conducted field work in South America with the Aymara of Lake Titicaca region and the Uros of the Rio Desaguadero.

In 1938 his first book, The Peyote Cult, was published, and was immediately hailed as a classic, on the cutting edge of psychological anthropology. He was enabled by a Social Science Research Council Postdoctoral Fellowship to go to the Menninger Clinic in Topeka, Kansas in order to be trained in psychoanalysis, and from 1938 to 1939 he continued his research into the psychological depths of indigenous cultures at the clinic.

La Barre married Maurine Boie in 1939; she was a social worker and the editor of the social-work journal Family. She went on to teach at the Duke University Medical Center. The couple had three children together.

From 1939 until 1943 La Barre taught anthropology at Rutgers University. World War II intervened, and he served as a Community Analyst for the War Relocation Authority based in Topaz, Utah. Through his military connections, he was able to conduct field research in China and India during the closing years of the war. He served on the staff of Field Marshal Montgomery, which he described in later years as "glorious". During the war years, he was able to travel on official business, and he made the first of three crossings of Africa.

== After World War II ==
In 1946, La Barre was appointed professor at Duke University, which was to become his academic home for the rest of his career.

In 1954, he published The Human Animal, a study of the psychoanalytical approach to psychology and culture. The book became a global bestseller.

He published The Aymara Indians of the Lake Titicaca Plateau and They Shall Take up Serpents: Psychology of the Southern Snake-handling Cult, which are regarded as landmark studies of indigenous peoples in the Amazon and the extremist culture of Christian fundamentalism lurking in the urban and rural landscapes of contemporary America.

During the 1950s and 1960s, La Barre became absorbed in the study of altered states of consciousness precipitated by the ingestion of shamanistic plants from peyote and ayahuasca to magic mushrooms. Collaborating with Schultes and R. Gordon Wasson, La Barre conducted profoundly original investigations into the anthropology and archeology of altered states of consciousness. Convinced that the shamanism of Siberia was equivalent to the shamanic practices he had observed in the Americas, La Barre established a global theory of shamanism that supplanted that of Mircea Eliade.

In 1970, La Barre was honoured with an endowed chair, the James B. Duke Professorship of Anthropology, and he published the book that he considered to be his magnum opus, The Ghost Dance: Origins of Religion, a psychoanalytic account of the birth of religion through the lens of his treatment of the ghost dance religion of native America.

His later books include: Shadow of Childhood: Neoteny and the Biology of Religion and Muelos: A Stone Age Superstition about Sexuality.

Throughout his academic career, La Barre received a host of honours, awards, and titles.

He died in 1996 at his home in Chapel Hill, North Carolina.

Large collections of his papers are deposited at Duke University and the National Anthropological Archives in the Smithsonian Institution.

== Bibliography ==
- Weston La Barre: Muelos: A Stone Age Superstition About Sexuality, Columbia University Press, 1984, ISBN 0-231-05961-2
- Weston La Barre: Shadow of Childhood: Neoteny and the Biology of Religion, University of Oklahoma Press, 1991, ISBN 0-8061-2328-1
- Weston La Barre: The Peyote Cult, Shoe String Press, 1976, ISBN 0-208-01456-X [1st edition, 1938]
- Weston La Barre: Ghost Dance: The Origins of Religion, Waveland Press, 1990, ISBN 0-88133-561-4 [1970]
- Weston La Barre: They Shall Take Up Serpents: Psychology of the Southern Snake-Handling Cult, Waveland Press, 1992, ISBN 0-88133-663-7 [1st edition, 1962]
- Weston La Barre: The Human Animal, Chicago, 1954 (on Japanese snake phallisms, among other things).
- Weston La Barre, Culture in Context, Selected Writings of Weston La Barre, Duke UP, Durham, NC, 1990.
- Weston La Barre, Psychoanalysis in Anthropology, in Science and Psychoanalysis vol. 4, Jules Masserman, ed., New York: Grune and Stratton, 1961.

== Sources ==
- Atwood D. Gaines & Paul E. Farmer, "Weston La Barre", in Encyclopedia of Anthropology ed. H. James Birx (2006, SAGE Publications; ISBN 0-7619-3029-9)
