= Aix-en-Provence possessions =

1611 witch trials in France

The Aix-en-Provence possessions were a series of alleged cases of demonic possession occurring among the Ursuline nuns of Aix-en-Provence (South of France) in 1611. Father Louis Gaufridi was accused and convicted of causing the possession by a pact with the devil, and he was tortured by strappado and his bones dislocated. He was then executed in April 1611 by strangulation and his body burned. This case provided the legal precedent for the conviction and execution of Urbain Grandier at Loudun more than 20 years later. This event led to possessions spreading to other convents and a witch burning in 1611.

== Madeleine de Demandolx ==
The early 17th century was host to the peak of accusations in France's witchcraft hunt. Prior to the 17th century the testimony of a person perceived to be possessed was not considered reliable as anything they might say was likely from the "Father of Lies" (John 8:44).

Madeleine de Demandolx de la Palud was a young French aristocrat, 17 years of age. Father Louis Gaufridi was the parish priest. In 1607 Demandolx entered the Ursuline convent at Marseille where she confessed to the superior that she had been intimate with Gaufridi. The mother superior then sent her to Aix to place Demandolx some distance from Gaufridi. In the summer of 1609, Demandolx began to exhibit convulsions, shaking and other symptoms of what was taken to be demonic possession, and the condition seemed to be contagious, as other nuns also began to show symptoms. All attempts at exorcism proved unsuccessful. When the priest at Aix confronted Gaufridi about the alleged affair, he denied it.

Later in life, she was accused of witchcraft in 1642 and again in 1652. Her family abandoned her, she was fined and spent 10 years in prison after which she was released to Chateauvieux, France where she died in 1670.

== Investigation ==
Demandolx and Louise Capeau were referred to Sébastien Michaëlis, prior of the Dominican community of Saint-Maxim and French inquisitor. Michaelis was assisted in his investigation by another Dominican, Father Doncieux.

In the winter of 1610, they underwent further attempts at exorcism at Sainte-Baume in a holy cave where, according to tradition, Mary Magdalen had once lived. The women appeared to be trying to outdo each other. Capeau would speak in a deep bass voice; Demandolx would scream obscenities. All were convinced they were possessed. During one of these sessions Gaufridi was claimed to have seduced Demandolx, to have caused her to become possessed, and taken her to sabbats.

Anti-clerical French republican Jules Michelet gives credence to the claim that Gaufridi seduced Demandolx, and perhaps others. However, Michelet views Gaufridi, not as a parish priest of Marseille, but the spiritual director of the nuns at Aix, where, due to their monotonous lives and excessive imagination, most of them were infatuated with the priest. He suggests that Capeau was both jealous and "a trifle mad".

Marseille supported Gaufridi, not wishing to see the Inquisition at Avignon spread to their environs. The Bishop and chapter attributed the whole affair to the antipathy the monks had towards secular priests. The Franciscans, rivals to the Dominicans, also supported Gaufridi. At one point, when a friar place a holy relic on her Capeau said, "Gaufridi is no magician at all, and therefore could not be arrested." She subsequently recovered and stated that the Capuchins had failed to make the devil swear to tell the truth.

Gaufridi's appeal to Parliament was headed off by Michaëlis, who filed his appeal first.

Capeau claimed to be possessed by a devil named "Verrine". When caught in inconsistent statements, Capeau responded "The Devil is the Father of Lies". The interrogation of the parties attracted a number of spectators, and Capeau soon outdrew Michaëlis's preaching. According to Michelet, Michaëlis would have put an end to it had it been only Capeau. Because of her general lack of credibility, Gaufridi would not have been condemned on her testimony alone, but the younger Demandolx was afraid of Capeau and lest she also be accused, confirmed whatever the older woman said.

In court, Father Gaufridi strongly recanted the confession extracted from him by torture. In the eyes of the court, the protest was useless: the signed confession and alleged pact were evidence weighty enough to sentence the priest to death by fire. Even after the sentence was given, inquisitors continued to demand the names of Gaufridi's accomplices.

== The sentence of Aix-en-Provence ==
April 30, 1611, was the day of Father Gaufridi's execution. With head and feet bare, a rope around his neck, Gaufridi officially asked pardon of God and was handed over to torturers. Still living after the torture of strappado and squassation, Gaufridi was escorted by archers while dragged through the streets of Aix for five hours before arriving at the place of execution. The priest was granted the mercy of strangulation before his body was burned to ashes.

Immediately following Gaufridi's execution Demandolx was apparently suddenly free of all possession. Her fellow demoniac, Sister Louise Capeau, was possessed until she died. Capeau accused a blind girl who was executed in July 1611. Both of the sisters were banished from the convent, but Madeleine remained under the watch of the Inquisition. She was charged with witchcraft in 1642 and again in 1652. During her second trial, Madeleine was again found to have the Devil's mark and was sentenced to imprisonment. At an advanced age, she was released to the custody of a relative and died in 1670 at the age of 80.

== Legacy ==
The hysteria begun at Aix did not end with Gaufridi's sentence and the banishment of the nuns. In 1613, two years later, the possession hysteria spread to Lille where three nuns reported that Sister Marie de Sains had bewitched them. Sister Marie's testimony was a near copy of Sister Madeleine's renouncement two years earlier.

More than 20 years later, in 1634, the Aix-en-Provence possessions set precedent for the conviction and execution of Urbain Grandier.

== See also ==
- Louviers possessions
- Malleus Maleficarum
- Christian views on witchcraft

== Sources ==
- Baroja, Julio Caro. The World of the Witches. 1961. Reprint, Chicago: University of Chicago Press, 1975.
- Astier, Joris (2019). "L'affaire Gaufridy : possession, sorcellerie et eschatologie dans la France du premier XVIIe siècle". Revue des sciences religieuses. 93 (1–2). Strasbourg University Press, Vol. 93, No. 1-2: 111–136. doi:10.4000/rsr.6283. S2CID 198031431.
