= Richard Bernard =

English Puritan clergyman, writer (1568–1641)

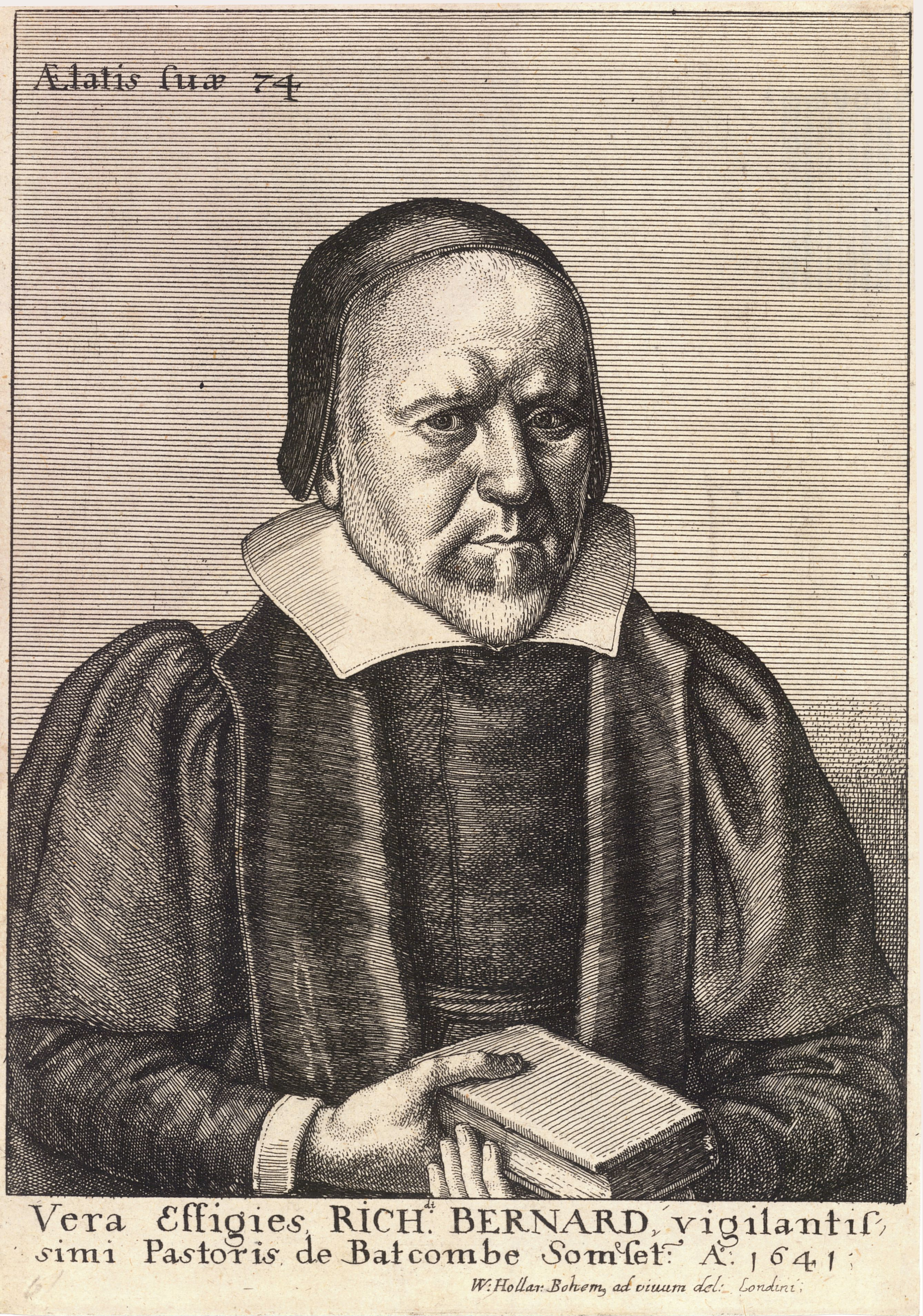
Engraving of Richard Bernard by Wenceslas Hollar

Richard Bernard (1568–1641) was an English Puritan clergyman and writer.

== Life ==
Bernard was born in Epworth and received his education at Christ's College, Cambridge, where he matriculated in 1592, obtained his BA in 1595, and an MA in 1598. His university education was paid for by Frances and Isabel Darcy, who were supporters of Puritans and radical English Protestants generally. He was married in 1601 and had six children. From 1612 to 1641 he lived in Somerset and preached in Batcombe.

Bernard was a Calvinist Puritan, but a moderate one. Bernard advocated a joyful approach to life, instead of the more serious and pious disposition that was encouraged at the time. Bernard wrote:

there is a kind of smiling and joyful laughter…which may stand…with the best man's piety.

He flirted with nonconformity to the Anglican Church when he was first preaching. He lost his job over his dissent in Worksop, on 15 March 1605. He established his Separatist church in 1606 with about 100 members, but then returned to his parish post in Worksop in 1607. He still refused to make the Sign of the Cross during baptisms, however. This led to him being brought before church courts again in 1608 and 1611.

When he was at Worksop he associated with the well-known Puritans William Brewster (1567–1644), a passenger on the Mayflower, and John Robinson (1575–1625), pastor and organiser of the Mayflower voyage.

Bernard wrote an influential handbook for ministers entitled The Faithfull Shepheard and his practice, which was published in 1607 and 1621. His most popular book was The Isle of Man (1627) which went through 16 printings by 1683. He led his generation in his advocacy for the imprisoned, the poor, and the Jews, the latter argument was made in an essay titled "The Great Mysterie of God's Mercie yet to Come." within the book, The Seaven Golden Candlestickes.

He frequently wrote against separation from the Church of England, which put him in conflict with Robinson and the New England churches.

His daughter Mary married Roger Williams, co-founder of the state of Rhode Island, in 1629. Roger and Mary Williams emigrated to the New World in 1631.

His predecessor at Batcombe was Philip Bisse; he was succeeded as preacher there by the Puritan theologian Richard Alleine.

== Published work ==
- A Large Catechisme Following The Order of the Common Authorized Catechisme Published for the Use of his Christian friends and welwillers, the inhabitants of Worsopp, Gainsborough, and Epworth 1602, 1607, 1612
- The Faithfull Shepheard- The Shepheards Faithfulnesse: Wherein Is For The Matter Largely, But For The maner, in few words, set forth the excellencie and necessitie of the ministerie; a ministers properties and dutie; his entrance into this function and charge; etc, 1607
- Christian Advertisements And Counsels Of Peace Also Disswasions From The Separatists Schisme, Commonly called Brownisme, 1608 (Also The Separatists Schisme? – no copies exist)
- The Faithfull Shepheard Amended And Enlarged: With The Shepeards Practise In Preaching Annexed Thereto, 1609
- The Sinners Safetie, If Heere Hee Looke For Assurance, 1609
- Contemplative Pictures With Wholesome Precepts. The First Part: Of God. Of The Diuell. Of Goodnesse. Of badnesse. Of heaven: of Hell, 1610
- Plain evidences: The Church of England apostolical, the separation schismatical, 1610
- Josuahs Godly Resolution In Conference With Caleb, Touching Household Gouernement For Well Ordering A Family: A twofold catechisme: one short, the other more large; both for instruction. In the end, certaine rules, for guiding to a holy conversation, 1612, 1629
- Two Twinnes: Or Two Parts Of One Portion Of Scripture. I. Is Of Catechising. II. Of The Ministers Maintenance, 1613
- A Weekes Worke, And A Worke For Every Weeke, 1616, 1628, 1650? (A Weekes Worke Containing Rules And Directions How To Walke In The Wayes Of Godliness Both To God And to Men)
- Davids Musick: Or Psalmes Of That Royall Prophet, Once The Sweete Singer Of That Israel Unfolded Logically, 1616
- A Staffe of Comforth to Stay the Weake, 1616
- Key Of Knowledge For The Opening Of The Secret Mysteries Of St Johns Mysticall Revelation, 1617
- The Fabulous Foundation Of The Popedom: Or A Familiar Conference Between Two Friends to the truth Philalethes, and Orthologus, 1619
- The Seaven Golden Candlestickes, 1621
- The Good Mans Grace. Or His Stay In All Distresse, 1621
- Looke Beyond Luther, Or, An Answere To That Question, So Often And So Insultingly Proposed By Our adversaries, asking us; where this our religion was before Luthers time? Etc, 1623, 1624
- Rhemes Against Rome, 1626
- The Isle Of Man, Or, The Legall Proceeding In Man-Shire Against Sinne Wherein, By Way Of A Continued allegorie, the chiefe malefactors disturbing both Church and Common-wealth, are detected, etc 1627, 1628, 1629, 1630, 1640, 1632, 1634, 1635, 1648, 1658, 1659, 1668, 1674, 1677, 1683; 1719, 1778, 1997
- A Guide to Grand-Jury Men, Divided Into Two Bookes: In The First, Is The Authors Best Advice To Them what to doe, before they bring in a billa vera in cases of witchcraft, etc, 1627, 1629, 1630
- Ruth's Recompense, 1628
- The Bible-Battells. Or The Sacred Art Military For The Rightly Wageing Of Warre According To Holy Writ, 1629
- The Common Catechisme With A Commentary Thereupon, By Questions And Answers, Following The Verie wordes, as they lie in their order without alteration and Good Christian, Looke to thy Creede, 1630, 1631, 1632, 1635, 1640
- Christian See To Thy Conscience Or A Treatise Of The Nature, The Kinds And Manifold Differences Of Conscience, 1631
- The Ready Way to Good Works, 1635
- The Anatomie Of The Service Book, Dedicated To The High Court Of Parliament Wherein Is Remonstrated the unlawfulnesse of it, etc (by Dwalphintramis), 1641
- A Threefold Treatise Of The Sabbath Distinctly Divided Into The Patriarchall, Mosaicall, Christian Sabbath: for the better clearing and manifestation, etc, 1641
- A short vievv of the prælaticall Church of England wherein is set forth the horrible abuses in discipline and government, layd open in tenne sections by way of quære and petition, the severall heads whereof are set downe in the next page : whereunto is added a short draught of church-government., Richard Bernard; John Bernard, [London : s.n.], 1641, 1661
- The Article of Christs Descension into Hell, 1641
- The Bibles Abstract And Epitome The Capitall Heads, Examples, Sentences, And Precepts of All The Principall matters in theologie: collected together for the most part alphabetically, etc (Pro Richardo Barnardo), 1642
- An Epistle Directed To All Justices Of Peace In England And Wales, 1642
- Certaine Positions Seriously To Bee Considered Of Shewing The Danger Of Doing Any Thing In And About the worship of God that hath not warrant from his written word, 1644
- Thesaurus Biblicus, Seu, Promptuarium Sacrum Whereunto Are Added All The Marginal Readings With The words of the text, etc (with William Retchford), 1661, 1664
- Collected works in Latin and English, 1598 (?), 1607, 1614, 1629 and 1641.
- Bernard's first publication was a translation of the Latin poet Terence, which had at least six editions.

== See also ==
- A Guide to Grand-Jury Men
- King James I
- Witch-hunt
