= The Human Animal (book) =

1954 book by Weston La Barre

- Cover of the first edition
- Author: Weston La Barre
- Language: English
- Subjects: Psychology, culture
- Publisher: University of Chicago Press
- Publication date: 1954
- Publication place: United States
- Media type: Print (Hardcover and Paperback)
- Pages: 371
- ISBN: 0226467066

The Human Animal is a 1954 book by the anthropologist Weston La Barre, in which the author discusses the psychoanalytical approach to psychology and culture. The classicist Norman O. Brown described the book as the most significant attempt at creating a "general theory of language" through a synthesis of psychoanalysis with other disciplines.
