= Louviers possessions =

1647 alleged demonic possessions in France

The Louviers possessions were a mass demonic possession incident that occurred at the Louviers Convent (Normandy, France) in 1647. The Louviers Possessions were similar to those in Aix-en-Provence in 1611 and those in Loudun in 1634. As with both the Aix case and the Loudun case, the conviction of the involved priests hinged on the confessions of the supposed possessed demoniacs.

The source for information on the subject is in large part a book entitled Histoire de Magdelaine Bavent, Religieuse de Louviers, avec son interrogatoir, etc. (History of Madeleine Bavent, a Nun of Louviers, together with her Examination, etc.), 4to: Rouen, 1652 from an interview with Madeleine Bavent by an Oratorian.

== Accusations ==
Madeleine Bavent was born at Rouen in 1607. An orphan, at the age of twelve she was bound as an apprentice to a linenworker, whose business was dependent on the Church's patronage. According to historian Jules Michelet, when Madeleine was fourteen, the confessor of the establishment drugged the apprentices probably with something like Atropa belladonna and led them to believe that he was conducting taking them to a "Sabbath". He raped four of them, including Madeleine.

At the age of sixteen, she entered a Hospitaller convent that had been established in the woods outside Louviers. Michelet says that the elderly supervisor, Father David, "was an 'Adamite', preaching the nudity Adam practised in his innocence", but that Madeleine declined "to submit to this strange way of living' and incurred the displeasure of her superiors. She lived apart from the rest of the community, having been given the job of tourière – the nun who attends to the turning-box of a convent, by means of which communication is kept up with the outside world. Upon Father David's death, he was succeeded as curé by Mathurin Picard, who appointed her sacristan, drugged her, and had sex with her, making her pregnant.

By 1625, Madeleine was eighteen and a full nun. She became the first possession victim when she claimed to have been bewitched by Picard, now deceased, and Father Thomas Boulle, the vicar of Louviers. Her confession to authorities claimed that the two men had abducted her and taken her to a Witches' Sabbath. There, she claimed that she was married to the Devil, whom she called "Dagon", that she committed sexual acts with him on the altar, and that two men were crucified and disemboweled as these acts took place.

Madeleine's confession prompted an investigation, which found that other nuns also reported having been brought to secret sabbats by Picard and Boulle, where sexual intercourse with demons, particularly Dagon, took place. These confessions were accompanied by what investigators believed were classic signs of demonic possession: contortions, unnatural body movements, speaking in tongues (glossolalia), obscene insults, and blasphemies.

Beyond mere symptoms of possession, the body of Sister Barbara of St. Michael was said to be possessed by a specific demon named Ancitif.

== Exorcisms ==
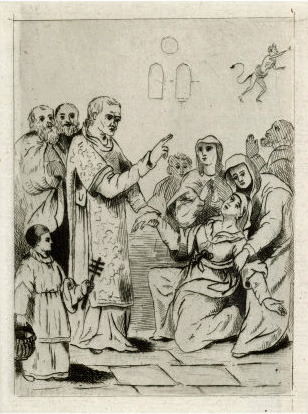
Exorcism of Madeleine Bavent

As in the Loudun possessions a decade prior, the exorcisms at Louviers were a public spectacle. Nearly every person present at the exorcisms was questioned by the inquisitors, and the entire town of Louviers began exhibiting symptoms of hysteria as the cries of the nuns undergoing exorcism rose with the screams of Father Boulle, who was tortured at the same time; Mathurin Picard had died previous to the public display.

Father Bosroger recorded the proceedings, which he would publish in 1652. In his account, nuns were said to confess further evidence against Picard and Boulle. In addition to tempting them into sexual acts, Satan (supposedly in the form of Picard and Boulle) had also tried leading the nuns down the road of heresy. Appearing to the nuns as a beautiful angel, the Devil engaged them in theological conversations so clever that they began to doubt their own teachings. When told that this was not the same information they had been taught, Satan replied that he was a messenger of heaven who was sent to reveal fatal errors in what was otherwise accepted dogma.

Signs of possession continued throughout the exorcisms. One witness wrote that a nun "ran with movements so abrupt that it was difficult to stop her. One of the clerics present, having caught her by the arm, was surprised to find that it did not prevent the rest of her body from turning over and over as if the arm were fixed to the shoulder merely by a spring."

== Punishment ==
As hysteria rose, it seemed inevitable that a trial would occur and Father Boulle's fate would be sealed. During the exorcisms, though, parliament at Rouen passed sentence: Sister Madeleine Bavent would be imprisoned for life in the church dungeon, Father Thomas Boulle would be burnt alive, and the corpse of Mathurin Picard would be exhumed and burned.

== Catalogue of symptoms ==
After the nuns at Louviers were afflicted, authorities undertook the task of cataloguing the symptoms of demonic possession. The treatise they developed included fifteen indications of true possession:

1. To think oneself possessed.
2. To lead a wicked life.
3. To live outside the rules of society.
4. To be persistently ill, falling into heavy sleep and vomiting unusual objects (either such natural objects as toads, serpents, maggots, iron, stones, and so forth; or such artificial objects as nails, pins, etc.).
5. To utter obscenities and blasphemies.
6. To be troubled with spirits ("an absolute and inner possession and residence in the body of the person").
7. To show a frightening and horrible countenance.
8. To be tired of living.
9. To be uncontrollable and violent.
10. To make sounds and movements like an animal.
11. To deny knowledge of fits after the paroxysm has ended.
12. To show fear of sacred relics and sacraments.
13. To curse violently at any prayer.
14. To exhibit acts of lewd exposure or abnormal strength.

== Modern viewpoints ==
It is widely believed today that the Louviers Possessions, similar in many ways to those at Aix-en-Provence (1611), Lille (1613), and Loudun (1634) were part of a political and religious "show" in France. According to Stuart Clark, "Possession and exorcism were textual/theatrical allegories of the conflict between the church and Satan, a conflict that, contemporaries believed, was reaching its climax in the early modern era."

They also differ from later cases of possession and witch-hunt hysteria like that in England and Colonial America in that they involve lurid sex themes. During the exorcisms at Louviers, nuns were seen to raise their habits and beg for sexual attention, use vulgar language, and make lascivious movements. In the earlier case at Loudun, a local doctor named Claude Quillet wrote, "These poor little devils of nuns, seeing themselves shut up within four walls, become madly in love, fall into a melancholic delirium, worked upon by the desires of the flesh, and in truth, what they need to be perfectly cured is a remedy of the flesh."

Most demonic possessions in France of this period (from the early to late 17th century) were of young women and appeared most often in the convents. Physicians and psychologists today attribute much of the activities to sexual hysteria, alluded to so long ago by Quillet. Robert Mandrou and Jean-Martin Charcot echoed many seventeenth-century physicians and following a French school of anti-Catholic medical positivism of the nineteenth century argued that mental disorders —primarily hysteria triggered the bizarre behaviors. Extreme seizures explained in the 17th century are today believed to point to epilepsy and similar diseases. In the time-frame of the cases in France, demonic possession served as a catchall explanation for any personality anomaly.

Feminist historians reject the term "hysteria" as misogynistic, and reject the characterization of seventeenth century convents as places of "sexual frustration and/or debauchery and constant intellectual ennui." Moshe Shulovsky views these instances in the context of feminine religious mysticism and notes that they tended to appear at new or recently reformed convents.

== Louviers possessions in culture ==
Heavy metal band King Diamond's concept album The Eye tells the story that took place during the Louviers possessions. Amongst the protagonists of the story there are Madeleine Bavent and Father Mathurin Picard.

== See also ==
- Malleus Maleficarum
- Christian views on witchcraft
- Witch-hunt
- Execution by burning

== Sources ==
- Michelet, Jules (1939) [1862]. La Sorcière [Satanism and Witchcraft]. Translated by A.R. Allinson. Reprint, Secaucus, N.J.: Citadel Press, 1992
- Summers, Montague (1927). The Geography of Witchcraft. History of Civilization. London: Routledge and Kegan Paul.
