= Loudun possessions =

1634 witchcraft trial in Loudun, France

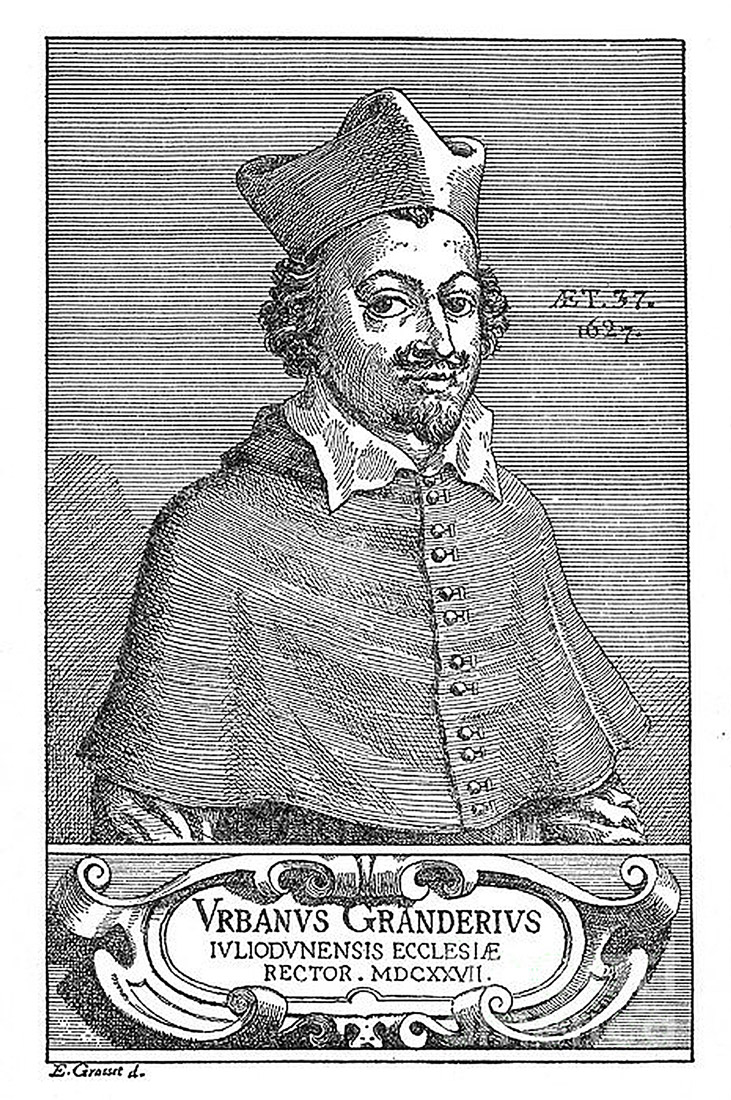
Urbain Grandier, who was convicted and executed as a result of the Loudun possessions

The Loudun possessions, also known as the Loudun possessed affair (French: affaire des possédées de Loudun), was a notorious witchcraft trial that took place in Loudun, Kingdom of France, in 1634. A convent of Ursuline nuns said they had been visited and possessed by demons. Following an investigation by the Catholic Church, a local priest named Urbain Grandier was accused of summoning the evil spirits. He was eventually convicted of the crimes of sorcery and burned at the stake.

The case contains similar themes to other witchcraft trials that occurred throughout western Europe in the 17th century, such as the Aix-en-Provence possessions (France) in 1611 or the Pendle witches (England) in 1612 before reaching the New World by the 1690s.

== Background ==
In its continuing efforts to consolidate and centralize power, the Crown under Louis XIII ordered the walls around Loudun, a town in Poitou, France, to be demolished. The populace were of two minds concerning this. The Huguenots, for the most part, wanted to keep the walls, while the Catholics supported the monarchy. In May 1632, an outbreak of the plague in Loudun claimed many lives. Together, the events contributed to an atmosphere of anxiety and apprehension in the divided town.

== Urbain Grandier ==
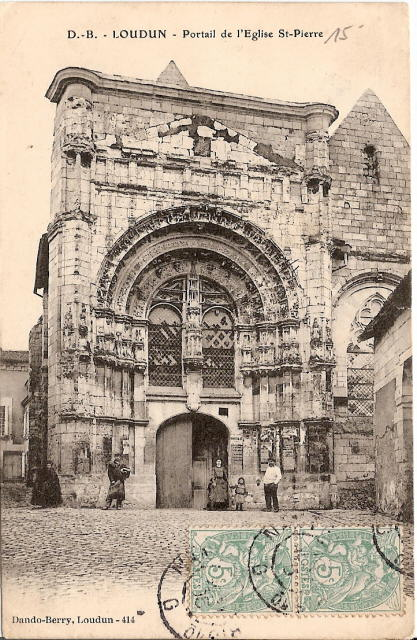
Church of Saint Peter, Loudun (fr)

Urbain Grandier was born at Rouvère towards the end of the sixteenth century. In 1617 he was appointed parish priest of St-Pierre-du-Marché in Loudun and a canon at the Church of Sainte-Croix. Grandier was considered to be a good-looking man, wealthy, and well-educated. An eloquent and popular preacher, he incurred the envy of some of the local monks. As he did not support Cardinal Richelieu's policies, he was in favor of retaining the town's wall.

It was widely believed that Grandier had fathered a son by Philippa Trincant, the daughter of his friend, Louis Trincant, the King's prosecutor in Loudun. According to Monsieur des Niau, Counsellor at la Flèche, Grandier had aroused the hostility of a number of husbands and fathers, some quite influential, by the dishonor he had brought to their families through relations with the female members of their households. (However, Niau's views may be understood as those of a participant in the subsequent proceedings who fully endorsed them.)

Around 1629, Jacques de Thibault, possibly a relative of Philippa, was quite vocal in expressing his opinion of Grandier's conduct with women. When Grandier demanded an explanation, Thibault beat him with a cane outside the Church of Sainte-Croix. In the course of the resulting trial, Thibault raised certain charges in his defense, causing the magistrates to turn Grandier over to the ecclesiastical court. The Bishop then prohibited Grandier from performing any public functions as priest for five years in the Diocese of Poitiers, and forever in Loudun. Grandier appealed to the court at Poitiers. As a number of witnesses retracted their statements, the case was dismissed without prejudice should new evidence be presented.

== Loudun Ursulines ==
The Ursuline convent had been opened in Loudun in 1626. In 1632 prioress Jeanne des Anges presided over seventeen nuns, whose average age was twenty-five. The first reports of alleged demonic possession began about five months after the outbreak of plague in 1632, as it was winding down. While physicians (because there was nothing they could do) and wealthy property owners had left town, others attempted to isolate themselves. The convents had shut themselves behind walls, the nuns discontinued receiving parlor visitors. Grandier visited the sick and gave money to the poor.

A young nun said that she had had a vision of her recently deceased confessor, Father Moussant. Soon other nuns reported similar visions. Canon Jean Mignon, the convent chaplain who was also a nephew of Trincant, decided that a series of exorcisms was in order. In the town, the people were saying it was an "imposture."

The nuns claimed the demon Asmodai was sent to commit evil and impudent acts with them. During questioning about the supposed evil spirit thought to be possessing them, the nuns gave several answers as to who caused its presence: a priest, Peter, and Zabulon. It was after almost a week, on 11 October, that Grandier was named as the magician responsible, though none of them had ever met him. Next, people who were asserted to be physicians and apothecaries were brought in. Canon Mignon informed the local magistrates of what was happening at the convent. Grandier filed a petition stating that his reputation was under attack and that the nuns should be confined. The Archbishop of Bordeaux intervened and ordered the nuns sequestered, upon which the appearances of possession seemed to subside for a time.

The nuns' increasingly extreme behavior—shouting, swearing, barking, etc.—drew a considerable number of spectators. Eventually, Cardinal Richelieu decided to intervene. Grandier had already offended Richelieu by his public opposition to the demolition of the town walls, and his reputation for illicit relations with parishioners did not improve his standing with the cardinal. In addition, Grandier had written a book attacking the discipline of clerical celibacy as well as a scathing satire of the cardinal.

== Investigation ==
Around the time of the nuns' accusations, Jean de Laubardemont was sent to demolish the town tower. He was prevented from doing so by the town militia, and upon returning to Paris reported on the state of affairs in Loudun including the recent disturbance at the Ursuline convent. In November 1633, de Laubardemont was commissioned to investigate the matter. Grandier was arrested as a precaution against his fleeing the area. The Commissioner then began to take statements from witnesses who said Grandier often mysteriously appeared at the convent at all hours, although no one knew how he was able to get inside. The priest was further accused of all manner of indecency. Laubardemont then questioned Grandier as to the facts and articles of accusation, and after having made him sign his statement and denials, proceeded to Paris to inform the Court. Letters from the Bailly of Loudun, Grandier's chief supporter, to the Procurator-General of the Parlement, in which it was asserted that the possessions were an imposture, were intercepted. The latter's reply was also seized.

== Trial ==
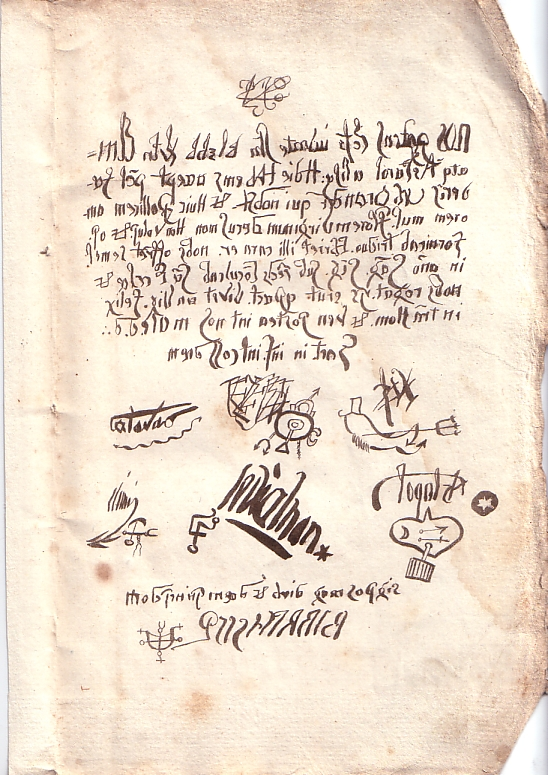
Urbain Grandier's alleged diabolical pact, written in backwards Latin

Monsieur de Laubardemont returned to Loudun with a Decree of the Council, dated 31 May 1634, confirming all his powers and prohibiting Parlement and all other judges from interfering in the matter, and forbidding all parties concerned from appealing, under penalty of a fine of five hundred livres. Grandier, who had been held at the prison of Angers, was returned to Loudun. Laubardemont once again observed and interrogated the nuns, now dispersed among a number of convents.

The Bishop of Poitiers, after having sent several Doctors of Theology to examine the victims, came to Loudun in person, and over the next two and half months, he performed exorcisms, as did Father Tranquille O.F.M.Cap.

On 23 June 1634, the Bishop of Poitiers and M. de Laubardemont being present, Grandier was brought from his prison to the Church of St. Croix in his parish, to be present at the exorcisms. All the possessed were there likewise. As the accused and his partisans declared that the possessions were mere impostures, he was ordered to be himself the exorcist, and the stole was presented to him. He could not refuse, and therefore, taking the stole and the ritual, he received the pastoral benediction, and after the Veni Creator had been sung, commenced the exorcism in the usual form.

In August 1634, the case was heard before the local magistrates. It was alleged that Grandier had made a pact with the devil, and had invited someone to a witches' sabbat.

Grandier was found guilty of sorcery and placing evil spells to cause the possession of the Ursuline nuns; he was condemned to be burned at the stake.

We have ordered and do order the said Urbain Grandier duly tried and convicted of the crime of magic, maleficia, and of causing demoniacal possession of several Ursuline nuns of this town of Loudun, as well as of other secular women, together with other charges and crimes resulting therefrom. For atonement of which, we have condemned and do condemn the said Grandier to make amende honorable, his head bare, a rope round his neck, holding in his hand a burning taper weighing two pounds, before the principal door of the church of St. Pierre-du-Marché, and before that of St. Ursula of this town. There on his knees, to ask pardon of God, the King, and the law; this done, he is to be taken to the public square of St. Croix, and fastened to a stake on a scaffold, which shall be erected on the said place for this purpose, and there to be burned alive...and his ashes scattered to the wind. We have ordered and so do order that each and every article of his moveable property be acquired and confiscated by the King; the sum of 500 livres first being taken for buying a bronze plaque on which will be engraved the abstract of this present trial, to be set up in a prominent spot in the said church of the Ursulines, to remain there for all eternity. And before proceeding to the execution of the present sentence, we order the said Grandier to be submitted to the first and last degrees of torture, concerning his accomplices.

Among other tortures, Grandier was subjected to "the boot".

== Execution ==
Grandier was taken to the Court of Justice of Loudun. His sentence having been read to him, he earnestly begged M. de Laubardemont and the other Commissioners to mitigate the rigour of their sentence. M. de Laubardemont replied that the only means of inducing the judges to moderate the penalties was to declare at once his accomplices. The only answer he gave was that he had no accomplices.

Father Grandier was promised that he could have the chance to speak before he was executed, making a last statement, and that he would be hanged before the burning, an act of mercy. From the scaffold Grandier attempted to address the crowd, but the monks threw large quantities of holy water in his face so that his last words could not be heard. Then, according to historian Robert Rapley, exorcist Lactance caused the execution to deviate from the planned course of action—enraged by taunting from the crowd that gathered for the execution, Lactance lit the funeral pyre before Grandier could be hanged, leaving him to be burned alive.

The executioner then advanced, as is always done, to strangle him; but the flames suddenly sprang up with such violence that the rope caught fire, and Grandier fell alive among the burning wood.

The possessions failed to stop after Father Grandier's execution; as a result, public exorcisms continued. In his summary of the Loudun possessions, author Moshe Sluhovsky reports that these displays continued until 1637, three years after Grandier's death: "[t]he last departing demons left clear signs of their exit from her [Jeanne des Anges, the mother superior of the community] body, when the names Joseph and Mary miraculously appeared inscribed on des Anges's left arm." Having achieved his original goal, Richelieu terminated the investigations into the events at Loudun.

Some claim that it was actually Jeanne des Anges who had the public exorcisms stopped. Jeanne allegedly had a vision that she would be freed from the Devil if she made a pilgrimage to the tomb of Saint Francis de Sales. She went to Annecy, then visited Cardinal Richelieu and King Louis XIII in 1638; the demons were apparently gone.

== Post historical analysis ==
In 1679, the English philosopher John Locke concluded: "The story of the nuns of Lodun [sic] possessed, was nothing but a contrivance of Cardinal Richelieu to destroy Grandier, a man he suspected to have wrote a book against him, who was condemned for witchcraft in the case, and burnt for it. The scene was managed by the Capuchins, and the nuns played their tricks well, but all was a cheat."

Agénor de Gasparin suggests that the early so-called "demonic manifestations" were actually pranks played by some of the boarding students in an effort to frighten some of the nuns; and as the matters progressed, it was the chaplain Jean Mignon who introduced Grandier's name to the suggestible nuns.

Michel de Certeau attributes the symptoms of the nuns as due to some psychological disorder such as hysteria, and views the events in context of the shifting intellectual climate of 17th century France. Possession allowed the nuns to express their ideas, concerns, and fears through the voice of another. The events at Loudun played out over a number of years, and attracted a good deal of attention throughout France. In this sense it was a sort of political-theatre. Grandier serves as a scapegoat to deflect the Louduns' ambivalence regarding the central Parisian authority.

Aldous Huxley, in his non-fiction book, The Devils of Loudun, argued that the accusations began after Grandier refused to become the spiritual director of the convent, unaware that the Mother Superior, Sister Jeanne of the Angels, had become obsessed with him, having seen him from afar and heard of his sexual exploits. According to Huxley, Sister Jeanne, enraged by his rejection, instead invited Canon Jean Mignon, an enemy of Grandier, to become the director. Jeanne then accused Grandier of using black magic to seduce her. The other nuns gradually began to make similar accusations. However, Monsieur des Niau, Counsellor at la Flèche, said that Grandier applied for the position, but that it was instead awarded to Canon Jean Mignon, a nephew of Monsieur Trincant.

Augustin Calmet, among others, has compared this case to the pretended possession of Martha Broissier (1578), a case which garnered a great deal of attention in its day. This comparison is based in part on the circumstances surrounding the incidents as well as the examinations of the possessions in question, all of which indicate pretended possessions, in contrast to cases considered more legitimate such as the possession of Mademoiselle Elizabeth de Ranfaing (1621). In his treatise, Calmet states that the causes of the injustice committed at Loudun were a mixture of political ambition, the need for attention, and a basic desire to dispose of political opponents. Calmet places the blame for the tragedy in Loudun with Cardinal Richelieu, chief minister of Louis XIII, and his goal of ruining Urbain Grandier, the Cure of Loudun.

Grandier's fate was likely sealed through obstructing the Cardinal's plan to demolish Loudun's fortifications, including the Castle of Loudun. The demolition, to be overseen by Jean de Laubardemont, was part of Richelieu's program of eliminating Huguenot strongholds by destroying local fortifications.

Both Protestant (Huguenot) and Catholic residents of Loudun were against the removal of their battlements, which would have left them unprotected against mercenary armies. Grandier cited the King's promise that Loudun's walls would not be destroyed, successfully preventing Laubardemont from demolishing the fortifications. Laubardemont promptly reported back to Richelieu with an account of the failed exorcisms, the libelous satire, and Grandier's obstruction of Richelieu's plans, thus setting the tragedy in Loudun and Grandier's demise in motion.

== Media ==
- The 1949 novel titled Drömmar om rosor och eld by the Swedish author Eyvind Johnson tells the story of the trial of Urbain Grandier, priest of the town who was tortured and burned at the stake in 1634. He was accused of being in league with the Devil and having seduced an entire convent of nuns.
- The 1952 non-fiction book titled The Devils of Loudun by Aldous Huxley tells the same story.
- John Whiting's 1961 theatre play The Devils (play), commissioned by Sir Peter Hall for the Royal Shakespeare Company, was based on Aldous Huxley's book.
- The Polish movie Mother Joan of the Angels from 1961 was loosely based on the Loudun events. The script is based on a novella by Jarosław Iwaszkiewicz.
- Krzysztof Penderecki's 1969 opera The Devils of Loudun (Die Teufel von Loudun), which premiered at the Hamburg State Opera, was based on Huxley's novel and Whiting's play.
- Ken Russell's 1971 film The Devils was based on Huxley's novel and Whiting's play.
- De Duivels van Loudun (1970) song by Louis Neefs.

== See also ==
- Aix-en-Provence possessions
- Louviers possessions
- Malleus Maleficarum
- Urbain Grandier
- Martha Broissier
- Mother Joan of the Angels (film)
- The Devils (film)
- Treatise on the Apparitions of Spirits and on Vampires or Revenants (1751)

== Sources ==
- Bodin, Jean. The Witches and the Law. Witchcraft in Europe 1100–1700: A Documentary History. Ed. Alan C. Kors & Edward Peters. Philadelphia: University of Pennsylvania Press. 1991.
- de Certeau, Michel. The Possession at Loudun. University of Chicago Press. 2000. ISBN 0-226-10034-0, ISBN 978-0-226-10034-0.
- Dumas, Alexander. Urbain Grandier, Celebrated Crimes – Available on Wikisource
- Sidky, H. Witchcraft, Lycanthropy, Drugs, and Disease: An Anthropological Study of the European Witch-Hunts. New York: Peter Lang Publishing, Inc. 1997.
- Astier, Joris (2019). "L'affaire Gaufridy : possession, sorcellerie et eschatologie dans la France du premier XVIIe siècle". Revue des sciences religieuses. 93 (1–2). Strasbourg University Press, Vol. 93, No. 1-2: 111–136. doi:10.4000/rsr.6283. S2CID 198031431.
