= Duke de Richleau =

Jean Armand Duplessis, the Duke de Richleau
- The cover of the 1950 edition of The Second Seal, depicting the Duke de Richleau and his love interest, the archduchess Ilona Theresa.
- First appearance: The Forbidden Territory
- Last appearance: Gateway to Hell
- Created by: Dennis Wheatley
- Portrayed by: Christopher Lee

In-universe information
- Gender: Male
- Occupation: Occultist, adventurer, aristocrat
- Nationality: Russian-French parentage, British resident

The Duke de Richleau is a fictional character created by Dennis Wheatley who appeared in 11 novels published between 1933 and 1970.

Dennis Wheatley originally created the character for a murder mystery Three Inquisitive People, written and set in 1931 but which was not published until 1939. The character first appeared in the novel The Forbidden Territory (1933), along with his friends Simon Aron, Richard Eaton and Rex Van Ryn, whom Wheatley dubbed 'the modern musketeers'. The friends were reunited in Wheatley's best-selling novel of the occult The Devil Rides Out (1934).

His favoured form of transport is the powerful luxury vehicle the Hispano-Suiza.

== Overview ==
The novels revolving around de Richleau's exploits ranged from occult stories, such as The Devil Rides Out, Strange Conflict and Gateway to Hell, to more straightforward thrillers based around non-supernatural intrigue. The Duke de Richleau (1875–1960) was an aristocrat, adventurer and occultist. Wheatley described him as follows:

"The Duke was a slim, delicate-looking man, somewhat above middle height, with slender fragile hands. … His hair was dark and slightly wavy, his forehead broad, his face oval with a rather thin but well moulded mouth, and a pointed chin that showed great determination. His nose was aquiline, his eyes grey, flecked with tiny spots of yellow; at times they could flash with piercing brilliance, and above them a pair of 'devil's eyebrows' tapered up towards his temples."

He was born in Russia as the only child of the exiled French nobleman and a Russian princess. In 1894, against the wishes of his father, he joined the French army, but, as recounted in The Prisoner in the Mask (1957), his military career was brought to an end as a result of his involvement in a plot to overthrow the French Republic and place Francois de Vendôme on the throne of France. This resulted in his becoming a wanted man in France, and he sought asylum in Britain, where he married Angela Syveton. The novel Vendetta in Spain (1961) tells of his undercover work to investigate the Spanish anarchists responsible for Angela's murder in 1906 during an assassination attempt upon the Spanish king.

The novel The Second Seal (1950) recounts how, in 1914, the duke was recruited by the British government to obtain intelligence on the build-up to war in Vienna and Belgrade. During this time, the duke fell in love with the Austrian Archduchess Ilona Theresa. Their relationship is resolved at the novel's end. By the early 1930s, when he met 'those modern musketeers' in Three Inquisitive People (written 1931, published 1939), he was living in London at Errol House, Curzon Street, Mayfair. He also owned a villa in Italy and a castle in Austria, and for his retirement he built a villa in Corfu. These 'modern musketeers' came together in an attempt to prove Richard Eaton innocent of the murder of his mother. In The Forbidden Territory (1933), the Duke, Richard Eaton and Simon Aron entered the Soviet Union to rescue Rex Van Ryn, who had been arrested. In the course of this adventure, they also rescued Princess Marie-Louise, who later married Richard.

Wheatley stated that he deliberately based the characters invented for Three Inquisitive People on the four friends of Alexander Dumas' novel The Three Musketeers. Athos = Duc de Richleau, Porthos = Rex van Ryn, Aramis = Simon Aron and D'Artagnan = Richard Eaton.

In the story The Devil Rides Out (1934), the Duke, Rex and Richard rescue Simon Aron who had joined a Satanic cult headed by the sinister Damien Mocata. The Duke returned to Spain in The Golden Spaniard (1938), with Richard Eaton, during Spain's civil war, to remove a vast bullion cache from seizure by the Republican government. In Codeword – Golden Fleece (1946) the Duke and his friends attempted to cripple the German war effort by business intrigues involving oil barges in neutral states among the Danube. In Strange Conflict (1941), the Duke was instrumental in foiling the activities of a Nazi occultist, based in a location to be discovered, which were threatening the Atlantic convoys. After World War II, the Duke and his friends travelled to South America to foil another satanic cult, this time targeting Rex Van Ryn in the tale Gateway to Hell (1970). In his final years, in Dangerous Inheritance (1965), the Duke left England to live on the island of Corfu, then leaving for a final adventure in Sri Lanka.

== Fictional character biography ==
Jean Armand Duplessis, Comte de Quesnoy, born in 1875, was the son of the ninth Duc de Richleau (1847–1909) and a Russian princess of the Plackoff family line. His father loathed the French Republican regime and lived as a voluntary exile on an estate belonging to his wife in the Carpathian foothills near Jvanets on the Dniester River in what was then the Russian Empire. The nearest town was Kamenets Podolskiy, now located in the Khmelnytskyi Oblast of western Ukraine, but at that time the region was known as Podolia. His mother died in 1888, when Armand was 14 years old. Armand was fluent in Russian, German, Polish, English, Italian and Spanish, and his mother tongue was French. Although Catholic by upbringing, he ceased to be observant in his 20s.

Armand inherited the title of Duke de Richleau on the death of his father in 1909, who was killed in a bomb attack by a Russian nihilist. At the same time, he also gained the Austrian title of Count Königstein, and inherited an estate on the Danube some 25 miles west of Vienna. Until he reached middle age, Armand undertook soldiering as a living but diversified into commodity trading and high finance on his own account and in partnership with his friend the Jewish banker Simon Aron. His hobbies were big game hunting, fishing and cookery, and he enjoyed fine French wines and premium Hoyo de Monterrey Cuban cigars.

Armand enlisted at the French military academy of St. Cyr in 1894. After graduation in 1897, he was posted for garrison duty to Madagascar where he studied the magic arts under "the most celebrated White Magician in the island". As a result of his studies into the occult, Armand became a believer in reincarnation and astrology and formed the view that the world was a battleground between the adepts of the Order of the Left-Hand Path and the Guardians of the Way of Light. After two and half years, he was sent to a cavalry regiment in Algeria. He was promoted to lieutenant colonel and decorated with the Légion d'honneur, France's highest military award, in 1903 on returning to France.

An ardent monarchist and imperialist with strong conservative convictions, de Richleau was nonetheless no bigot and abhorred racism. Although a soldier, he respected the tradition of chivalry and regarded war as an evil inflicted by ambitious and unscrupulous politicians. He was particularly critical of liberals, who, in his opinion, provided cover for anarchism, communism and radicalism to flourish. He opposed Freemasonry for similar reasons, as a "secret society of freethinkers and fanatics", believing the brotherhood to have been established by the mystic Illuminati and behind the violent revolutions of the 19th century.

In 1903, he took part in a conspiracy to restore the French monarchy and place François, Duc de Vendôme on the throne. The plot was uncovered, and de Richleau was accused of involvement in murder, but the charges eventually were dropped. He exchanged places with Vendôme to allow the prince to escape to Spain, thereby becoming The Prisoner in the Mask. He was transported to French Guiana and was to be imprisoned on Devil's Island, but managed to escape with the help of Channock Van Ryn, heir to the family-owned Chesapeake Banking and Trust Corporation of New York. The American helped him to see the positive side of liberalism. With a warrant out for his arrest, he returned to France in secret to infiltrate the Freemason's Lodge of the Grand Orient in July 1904, pretending to be a Russian refugee 'Vasili Petrovitch'. De Richleau was able to steal papers revealing the Freemason's control over the armed forces; material he passed to a nationalist and monarchist organization, the Ligue de la Patrie Française. The resulting scandal was known as the Affaire Des Fiches.

As a wanted man for his part in the royalist conspiracy against the French Republic, de Richleau was forced to live abroad for the rest of his life. He settled in London, became a naturalized British citizen, and married Angela Syveton (1874–1906), the widow of a French politician Gabriel Syveton, in April 1905. The marriage was to last only 14 months however, as Angela was killed in a bomb thrown by a Catalan anarchist, Matteo Morral, in Madrid on 31 May 1906. This killing led de Richleau to undertake a secret mission on behalf of King Alfonso XIII of Spain to infiltrate the anarchist movement in Barcelona and to pursue his Vendetta in Spain by bringing those who plotted his wife's killing to justice. Disguised as a Russian teacher and nihilist called 'Nikolai Chirikov', de Richleau gained the trust of the anarchist Francisco Ferrer, the founder of the Escuela Moderna, set up to teach radical values. He discovered that the school was a base for bomb making as part of the anarchists' doctrine of propaganda of the deed. However he was unable to testify to Ferrer's nefarious activities as he was kidnapped by the anarchist's associates and imprisoned on a ship sailing for Brazil.

Once in Latin America, de Richleau joined the army of a Central American republic to hunt Indian marauders in the jungle. On learning of his father's death in March 1909, he sailed to Europe to settle his affairs in Jvanets and spent some time in Vienna, "the city he loved best". Returning to Spain, he was arrested mistakenly when Barcelona was placed under martial law to repress a workers' insurrection in July 1909. Accused of being an anarchist revolutionary and murderer of a police detective, the duke was about to face a firing squad when he was recognized and reprieved.

Mistakenly believing that her husband was dead, de Richleau entered into a relationship with the Condesa Gulia de Córdoba y Coralles, the niece of Miguel de Unamuno, who bore him a daughter Lucretia-José in 1910. He was made a Knight of the Most Exalted Order of the Golden Fleece and took command of a Spanish cavalry regiment.

As a soldier of fortune, de Richleau joined the Turkish army to fight in the First Balkan War, where he commanded an army corps of Kurdish troops and took part in the Battle of Monastir in November 1912. During the Second Balkan War of 1913, de Richleau was promoted to chief of staff and fought alongside Mustafa Kemal Atatürk, who was later to become president of the Republic of Turkey. A bullet wound to his left lung left him unable to play fast games or run long distances. He returned to the Balkans in May 1914 on a secret mission for the British government to penetrate the Serbian nationalist organization known as the Black Hand. The duke reported to Sir Pellinore Gwaine-Cust, whom he had met in April 1914 along with an unnamed man (who is plainly meant to be Winston Churchill) at a party in London. Greatly concerned at the prospect of a general European war, Sir Pellinore had invited de Richleau to a meeting at his house in Carlton House Terrace, the first of several such meetings they were to have over the years. There, Sir Pellinore persuaded him to renew his acquaintance with Colonel Dragutin Dimitriyevitch, the head of Serbian military intelligence and also the Grand Master of the Black Hand. Using his Russian ancestry to full advantage, de Richleau was able to gain Dimitriyevitch's trust and was initiated into the Black Hand, thereby learning of the plot to assassinate Archduke Franz Ferdinand of Austria in Sarajevo. De Richleau was successful in preventing one assassination attempt but was wounded in doing so, and a second assassin then managed to kill the archduke and his wife. The resulting furor led the Austrian Empire to declare war on Serbia, and thus The Second Seal of the Book of Revelation was broken to let the demon of warfare loose upon the world.

Meanwhile, during May 1914 while in Vienna, he had fallen in love with Archduchess Ilona Theresa of the House of Habsburg-Lorraine (1889–1919), the granddaughter of Emperor Franz Joseph I of Austria and daughter of Rudolf, Crown Prince of Austria. She returned his affection but felt that her duty meant she could not marry a man of lesser rank and so their relationship remained initially a secret one. In honour of his gallantry in attempting to thwart the assignation in Sarajevo, the Archduchess made him a knight of the Order of Leopold and an honorary colonel in her regiment of hussars. The couple married without the Emperor's permission at a private ceremony on Thursday 17 September 1914 in Hohenembs, Vorarlberg, Austria, before departing for Switzerland. Tragically, the Archduchess suffered from tuberculosis and it appears that she may have died during the influenza pandemic of 1918–1920.

When war broke out in August 1914, de Richleau was accused of espionage by the Austrian military intelligence office, the Kundschafts Stelle, but lacking sufficient evidence to mount a prosecution, the duke was permitted to re-join his regiment and sent on a mission to liaise with the German military high command for the eastern front in East Prussia. As a Frenchman with British citizenship, he again came under suspicion and was only able to escape execution under martial law by murdering a German officer, Major Tauber, and an Austrian Baron, Colonel Lanzelin Ungash-Wallersee on their way to Berlin. He managed to reach the German HQ for the western front at Aachen on 24 August 1914, where he gained valuable information on Germany's tactics. He crossed the border into neutral Holland two days later. The intelligence that the duke provided to the French and British generals contributed to the German defeat in the Battle of the Marne in September 1914.

After the First World War, de Richleau fought with General Denikin's White Army in 1919–1920 against the Bolsheviks and Anarchists in southern Russia and Ukraine. His family estate in Jvanets was confiscated when the Bolsheviks gained control of Podolia in 1920.

The 'modern musketeers' were formed from a group of Three Inquisitive People who met in November 1931. De Richleau's three new friends were Simon Aron (born 1905), a Left-leaning Anglo-Jewish banker and partner in Schröchild Brothers; aviator Rex Mackintosh Van Ryn (born around 1903), the athletic son of de Richleau's old American friend Channock Van Ryn; and Richard Eaton (born 1908), a Conservative Englishman and publisher (of the Galleon Press).

He re-entered Russia in February 1932 to penetrate The Forbidden Territory of Soviet prison camps, the GULag, with the aid of Simon Aron to free Rex Van Ryn from a prison in Tobolsk in Siberia. The duke killed a man following them and, having freed Rex, was arrested in nearby Romanovsk. Managing to escape from the OGPU secret police in a gunfight the friends met an aristocratic French-born school teacher Marie-Lou (born 1911), since childhood a member of the household of Prince Shulimoff. Together they managed to fly to Kiev, where Richard Eaton was waiting with a private airplane to take them out of the USSR. Richard and Marie-Lou were married in Vienna and settled in England at the Eaton family residence of Cardinal's Folly, a mansion near Kidderminster, where their daughter Fleur was born on 5 September 1933.

The duke was instrumental in the unexplained death of the French former priest and black magician Damien Mocata, whose Satanic cult planned to initiate Simon Aron on 30 April 1935, Walpurgisnacht, the night that The Devil Rides Out. (Mocata was apparently a member of the Satanic Brotherhood of the Ram to which another member of Mocata's circle, Krishna Ratnadatta, was affiliated, according to later testimony given by Mary Morden to Lieutenant-Colonel William "CB" Verney, of the British Security Service in April 1960. Verney investigated another of Mocata's associates, the Canon, Augustus Copely-Syle, a Satanist focussed on replicating human life in the form of homunculi. In 1930, Copely-Syle persuaded Henry Beddows to make an offering To the Devil, a Daughter, in return for success in business. He planned to ritually sacrifice the girl, Ellen Beddows, upon her 21st birthday on 6 March 1951. Verney foiled the plot with the help of his future wife Molly Fountain and her son John.)

The duke and friends also rescued another neophyte from Mocata's control, the Hungarian Tanith (born 1912), with whom Rex fell in love and married. Tragically, Tanith died a few months later during childbirth, leaving Rex to bring up his son Robin, later also known as Trusscott, alone.

During the political tension leading up to the Spanish Civil War, de Richleau was approached by his natural daughter Lucretia-José to recover a fortune in gold from the Madrid vault of her adopted father's bank, the Banco Coralles, to prevent the ten tons of bullion from falling into the hands of the Loyalists, who would have sent it off to Soviet Russia to buy arms. With her blond hair Lucretia-José was known as The Golden Spaniard, la Española Dorada. She had inherited the duke's talent for espionage and had infiltrated the Federación Anarquista Ibérica, "the inner organization of the Spanish Anarchists". The duke, who had disguised himself as a French socialist 'Hypolite Dubois', and Richard Eaton removed over 800 gold bars surreptitiously from the bank and had these melted down and reformed as pots and pans. However, in early August 1936 they were arrested in Madrid for having entered the country with false passports and for carrying unlicensed firearms. They managed to escape a firing squad with the help of Rex and Simon, who were also in Spain to help the Loyalist Republican government against the rebel Nationalist coalition, led by Francisco Franco. Rex and Richard were able to fly the bullion to Malaga where Marie-Lou was waiting in a yacht in December 1936. As they attempted to recover the bullion, however, Lucretia-José, Richard, Rex and the duke, who had re-joined them, were arrested and only the timely intervention of Simon saved them from certain execution. The four friends then quit Spain in disgust with all factions, expressing a hope that fascist and communist would shoot each other and leave the world in peace.

As war threatened to engulf Europe once more, the duke (by now an implacable enemy of the Nazis) reformed the group to undertake a mission Codeword – Golden Fleece in Poland and Romania. They succeeded in disrupting secret negotiations over Poland's surrender to the Germans in September 1939, which were taking place on Baron Lubieszów's estate (near Pinsk, and now to be found in Lyubeshiv Raion, Ukraine), between 'General Mack', the false name adopted by one of Poland's "most famous statesmen", and General Count von Geisenheim and a senior Nazi, Major Bauer. Trapped between the advancing German and Soviet armies, De Richleau and his friends escaped to Romania, where they sought to cut supplies of oil transported by barge up the Danube to Germany. A botched kidnap attempt on von Geisenheim and the German commercial attaché in Bucharest on 23 September 1939 left the two Germans injured and their driver dead. A subsequent gun battle with members of the pro-Nazi Romanian Iron Guard resulted in the death of a policeman and an Iron Guard militiaman. The duke was shot several times and only narrowly survived. The friends reached Istanbul safely and provided the British government with an option to buy the oil barges and prevent supplies from reaching the Germans.

De Richleau made two further secret missions into German occupied Europe in 1940, one to Czechoslovakia and the other to the Low Countries. German submarines were sinking the UK's shipping convoys across the Atlantic with uncanny accuracy and the duke suspected that they were using black magic to locate the supply ships. With his friends, the duke embarked upon a Strange Conflict with a Voodoo sorcerer, or Bokor, Doctor Saturday, which took them to the Caribbean island of Haiti in 1941. Doctor Saturday committed suicide, apparently driven insane by an apparition of the ancient Greek god Pan.

The duke's principal contact in the British security establishment was the Baronet Sir Pellinore Gwaine-Cust, whom he had met in 1914 along with Winston Churchill.

When Rex went missing from Buenos Aires after stealing a million dollars from the family bank of which he was a director in December 1952, the duke, Richard and Simon headed for South America, a journey that was to lead them to a veritable Gateway to Hell deep in the Amazon jungle. While heading up the Latin American division of the Chesapeake Banking and Trust Corporation in Buenos Aires, Rex had begun a relationship with the film actress Silvia Seingiest (c. 1905–1953) and had been drawn into a Black Power group, controlled by the continent's top Satanist, Don Salvador Marino, known as "the Prince". When Richard and Simon arrived in Buenos Aires, they met Rex's niece Miranda Van Ryn, to whom Simon later became engaged. Discovering Rex's relationship with Silvia, Richard and Simon went to meet her in Punta Arenas and then followed her Santiago de Chile. There they were falsely accused of murdering an American militant for the cause of Black Power, Nella Nathan (1926–1953), whom they had rescued from certain rape at a Black Mass at which Silvia presided. With the duke's help they were cleared of the charge and in February 1953 the three friends made their way to the Black Power training camp in the Salar de Uyuni, the salt flats of the Andean plateau in Bolivia.

The Black Power group planned to organize a worldwide insurrection among disaffected urban youth, ostensibly to gain equal rights for Black people. Rex had embezzled his bank's money to demonstrate his loyalty to the cause but had come to realize that the group was part of a plot to create chaos and undermine civilization. Reunited, and with Silvia's help, the friends defeated the Prince and his lieutenants: former SS Gruppenführer Baron von Thumm; Lincoln B Glasshill, a black American lawyer; the Moroccan El Aziz; the Jamaican Harry Benito; an Indian Satanist by the name of Kaputa; an indigenous Andean called Pucara; and their Zombie guards. At a ruined Atlantean temple some 100 miles north of the Madeira River in the Amazon basin, Silvia interrupted a black magic ceremony, setting off a violent electrical storm in which she, the Prince and his acolytes perished.

Coming into what proved to be a Dangerous Inheritance, de Richleau visited Ceylon in 1958 to take possession of a diamond mine. The duke became embroiled in a fraud to remove a cache of diamonds without an export licence and assisted in the jailbreak of his legal advisor Douglas Rajapakse, who was also Fleur's husband and who had been framed by a corrupt policeman. In order to escape Ceylon with Truss Van Ryn, who had assisted in Rajapakse's escape from prison and had then been accused falsely of murder, the duke held a Buddhist high priest hostage for several hours until Rex's aircraft was able to fly them all out of the country.

From his villa on Corfu, to which he had retired, de Richleau was able to reminisce with his friend Simon Aron in 1960:

Simon: "Remember the old days? How we used to rag one another – joke about being modern Musketeers with you as our noble Athos?"

Armand said: "Indeed I do. And what a fine team we made! The mighty Rex as Porthos, level-headed Richard as D'Artagnan and yourself as the subtle-minded Aramis; pitting our wits and weapons against every variety of rogue half-way across the world – from Russia to Haiti and Poland to Spain. What marvellous fun we had!"

Armand Duplessis, 10th Duc de Richleau, died of a heart attack on the flight from Ceylon on 25 November 1960.

== List of novels ==
The 11 books featuring the character, with the dates when first published, and the period covered by the plot of each book, are as follows:

1. The Prisoner In The Mask (9 September 1957) covers January 1894 to October 1903
2. Vendetta in Spain (21 August 1961) covers 31 May 1906 to 14 September 1909.
3. The Second Seal (9 November 1950) covers April 1914 to 18 September 1914.
4. Three Inquisitive People (12 December 1939 as part of anthology; 1 February 1940 as stand-alone volume) covers 22 November 1931 to June 1932
5. The Forbidden Territory (3 January 1933) covers 24 January 1933 to March 1933
6. The Devil Rides Out (12 December 1934) covers 29 April 1935 to 4 May 1935.
7. The Golden Spaniard (6 August 1938) covers 2 July 1936 to 7 December 1936.
8. Codeword – Golden Fleece (30 May 1946) covers 28 July 1939 to October 1939.
9. Strange Conflict (21 April 1941) covers October 1940 to 1941.
10. Gateway to Hell (17 August 1970) covers 31 December 1953 to February 1954.
11. Dangerous Inheritance (23 August 1965) covers 18 April 1958 to November 1960.

== Adaptations ==
De Richleau was played by actor Christopher Lee in The Devil Rides Out, a 1968 film adaptation of the second published novel in the series. His first name is this film is Nicholas.

A film adaptation of The Forbidden Territory previously had been made in 1934, but replaced De Richleau with a character named Sir Charles Farringdon, played by Ronald Squire.

== See also ==
- Roger Brook
