= Black August (novel) =

1934 novel by Dennis Wheatley

- First edition
- Author: Dennis Wheatley
- Language: English
- Genre: Adventure novel
- Publisher: Hutchinson
- Publication date: January 1934
- Publication place: United Kingdom
- Media type: Print (Hardcover)

Black August is an adventure novel by the British writer Dennis Wheatley. First published in 1934, it is set in about 1960, when an economic and political crisis causes a collapse of civilization.

It was the first (in order of publication) of Dennis Wheatley's novels to feature the character Gregory Sallust. He wrote several more Gregory Sallust novels, most of which were set in earlier periods.

== Background ==
=== Creation of the novel ===
After the success of his novel The Forbidden Territory, published in January 1933, Wheatley wrote his next novel Such Power is Dangerous in about a fortnight, and it also sold well. However, writing Black August occupied him for forty weeks. In the novel he introduced the character Gregory Sallust, largely based on Gordon Eric Gordon-Tombe. Gordon-Tombe, whom Wheatley first met in 1917, introduced him to a hedonistic lifestyle, which they enjoyed together for a few years. Involved in illegal activities, Gordon-Tombe was murdered in 1922.

=== Historical setting ===
1934, when the novel appeared, was the time of the Great Depression in the United Kingdom, part of a worldwide economic depression. It had caused a political crisis and the formation of the National Government in the United Kingdom in 1931. The British Union of Fascists was formed by Oswald Mosley in 1932; their members were called "Blackshirts" after Benito Mussolini's followers in Italy.

=== Fictional setting ===
A world is imagined a few years on from 1934, in which conditions have become more severe. "America had been driven more and more in upon herself, while Europe rotted, racked and crumbled...." America was now "prohibiting all further export to bankrupt Europe which could no longer pay, even in promises...." There was "starvation rampant in every city in Europe... Balkan and Central European frontiers disintegrating from month to month, while scattered, ill-equipped armies fought on broken fronts, for whom, or for what cause, they now scarcely knew...." In Britain, the United British Party is in government. There is seen to be a threat from Communists. The Greyshirts, an organization seemingly like Oswald Mosley's Blackshirts, become prominent.

During the story, the Government decide on a moratorium regarding outstanding business debts, to prevent the London Stock Exchange failing; but this causes a run on the banks. There is confrontation between Communists and the police, and there is sabotage of communication infrastructure by the Communists. In central London, public transport ceases, troops take positions, and people leave the city if they can. The Government resigns, and the Communist minority in the House of Commons makes a bid for power.

=== Technology ===
The use of new technology in the near-future is mentioned but not described in depth. Television is mentioned once (when, at a Cabinet meeting, ministers view the conditions in various parts of the country). One of the characters (Kenyon Wensleadale) has a private helicopter, though this has been commandeered and does not appear in the story. There are electric trains. Vehicles are powered by gas cylinders, referred to as "E.C.G."

== Plot summary ==
The story relates events during a summer.

Kenyon Wensleadale, the Marquis of Fane, begins a relationship with Anne Croome, a secretary, after they meet on a train journey. In London they have dinner at the Savoy Hotel; Kenyon, looking round the restaurant, "knew that this seeming prosperity was an empty, tragic sham. Two-thirds of these well-dressed people were already on the verge of ruin, or bankrupt".

Anne lives in the same lodging house as Gregory Sallust, a journalist. When Anne learns from him that Kenyon is of an aristocratic family, she wants to end the relationship. Conditions worsen in London, and Kenyon realizes it is necessary to get away and is anxious to take Anne with him, as he fears for her safety. As the Government resigns, Kenyon leaves with Anne and Kenyon's sister Veronica, who has been an intermediary in Kenyon's relationship with Anne. On their way out of the city centre, Kenyon's car is given an escort by a group of Greyshirts.

Driving through London Docklands the vehicles are unable to go further, confronted by "the blind, vicious fury of a starvation-maddened mob". They are saved when Gregory Sallust passes by, and recognizes them; he is apparently a Brigadier General, in charge of troops in three military vehicles, one with a machine-gun, which is used on the crowd. Sallust has bluffed his way to acquiring all this, his uniform coming from a fancy-dress shop. Kenyon, Ann and Veronica and the Greyshirts join Sallust and his troops; they are able to escape from London.

At Chatham Dockyard Sallust commandeers the destroyer Shark. His aim is to sail to the West Indies and start a colony. The ship's officer realizes the deception, and the men become mutinous. After a battle on board, there is a truce and Sallust's group are cast away on a small boat; after several days they come ashore at Shingle Street on the Suffolk coast.

Conditions have become typical of apocalyptic and post-apocalyptic fiction: after the crisis in which civilization collapses and communication ceases, isolated groups attempt to establish their own local versions of civilization. Sallust's group, joining the inhabitants of Shingle Street, set up defences and make forays into the surrounding area, taking produce and stock from farms. There is another group nearby, similarly isolated, with which Sallust's group establishes contact. Starving, murderous people roam the countryside.

After a series of adventures, Sallust, Kenyon, Anne and Veronica are held prisoners in Ipswich where a local Communist government has been set up; they are sentenced to death as enemies of the State, after resisting an attempt to seize their supplies. The judge as described by Wheatley bears a strong resemblance to Lenin. Waiting for execution, they switch on a radio and, for the first time in weeks, there is a broadcast: it is announced that the provisional Communist government that seized control in London during the crisis has been replaced by a reformed version of the Monarchy, headed by the Prince Regent. The counter-revolution topples the Soviets set up in major towns. Troops entering Ipswich liberate the prisoners. Sallust, in danger of a court-martial for taking troops under false pretences, is pardoned in an amnesty for those who took criminal action during the crisis.
