= The Devil Rides Out (film) =

1968 British film by Terence Fisher

- Theatrical release poster
- Directed by: Terence Fisher
- Screenplay by: Richard Matheson
- Based on: The Devil Rides Out; 1934 novel by Dennis Wheatley
- Produced by: Anthony Nelson Keys
- Starring: Christopher Lee; Charles Gray; Niké Arrighi; Leon Greene; Patrick Mower; Gwen Ffrangcon-Davies; Sarah Lawson; Paul Eddington; Rosalyn Landor
- Cinematography: Arthur Grant
- Edited by: Spencer Reeve
- Music by: James Bernard
- Production companies: Hammer Film Productions; Seven Arts Productions
- Distributed by: Warner-Pathé (UK); 20th Century Fox (US)
- Release dates: 20 July 1968 (UK); 18 December 1968 (US)
- Running time: 95 minutes
- Country: United Kingdom
- Language: English
- Budget: £285,000
- Box office: 276,459 admissions (France)

The Devil Rides Out (U.S. title: The Devil's Bride), is a 1968 British horror film directed by Terence Fisher and starring Christopher Lee, Charles Gray, Niké Arrighi and Leon Greene. It was written by Richard Matheson based on the 1934 novel of the same title by Dennis Wheatley.

It is considered one of Terence Fisher's best films. It was the final film to be produced by Seven Arts Productions after the company was merged with Warner Bros. to become Warner Bros.-Seven Arts on 15 July 1967.

== Plot ==
Set in London and the south of England in 1929, the story finds erudite Nicholas, Duc de Richleau, investigating the strange actions of his protegé, Simon Aron, the son of a late friend, who has a house replete with unusual markings and a pentagram. He quickly deduces that Simon is involved with the occult. De Richleau and his friend Rex Van Ryn manage to rescue Simon and another young initiate, Tanith, from a devil-worshipping cult. During the rescue, they disrupt a May Day ceremony on Salisbury Plain, in which the Devil appears under the guise of the "Goat of Mendes".

They escape to the country home of de Richleau's niece Marie and her husband Richard Eaton. They are followed by the group's leader, Mocata, who has a psychic connection to the two initiates. After visiting the house while de Richleau is absent to discuss the matter and an unsuccessful attempt to influence the initiates to return, Mocata forces de Richleau and the other occupants to defend themselves through a night of black magic attacks, ending with the conjuring of the Angel of Death. De Richleau repels the angel, but it kills Tanith instead (for, once summoned, it must take a life).

His attacks defeated, Mocata kidnaps the Eatons' young daughter Peggy. The Duc has Tanith's spirit possess Marie in order to find Mocata, but they only are able to get a single clue, until Rex realizes that the cultists are at a house he visited earlier. Simon tries to rescue Peggy on his own, but he is recaptured by the cult. De Richleau, Richard, and Rex also try to rescue her, but they are defeated by Mocata. A powerful force (or Tanith herself), however, starts controlling Marie and ends Peggy's trance. She then leads Peggy in the recitation of a spell which visits divine retribution upon the cultists and transforms their coven room into a church.

When the Duc and his companions awaken, they discover that the spell has reversed time and changed the future in their favour. Simon and Tanith have survived, and Mocata's spell to conjure the Angel of Death has been reflected back on him. Divine judgment ends his life, and he is subject to eternal damnation for his unholy summoning of the Angel of Death. De Richleau comments that it is God to whom they must be thankful.

== Cast ==
- Christopher Lee as Nicholas, Duc de Richleau
- Charles Gray as Mocata
- Niké Arrighi as Tanith Carlisle
- Leon Greene as Rex Van Ryn (dubbed by Patrick Allen)
- Patrick Mower as Simon Aron
- Gwen Ffrangcon-Davies as Countess d'Urfe
- Sarah Lawson as Marie Eaton
- Paul Eddington as Richard Eaton
- Rosalyn Landor as Peggy Eaton
- Russell Waters as Malin
- Eddie Powell as The Goat of Mendes (uncredited)
- Yemi Ajibade as African cultist (uncredited)
- Peter Swanwick as cultist (uncredited)
- Keith Pyott as Max (uncredited)

== Production ==
First proposed in 1963, the film eventually went ahead four years later once censorship worries over Satanism had eased. Production began on 7 August 1967, and the film starred Christopher Lee (in a rare heroic role), Charles Gray, Niké Arrighi and Leon Greene. The screenplay was adapted by Richard Matheson from Wheatley's novel. Christopher Lee had often stated that of all his vast back catalogue of films, this was his favourite and the one he would have liked to have seen remade with modern special effects and with his playing a mature Duke de Richleau. In a later interview, Lee also stated that Wheatley was so pleased with the adaptation of his book that he gave the actor a first edition of the novel.

The A-side of British rock band Icarus's debut single "The Devil Rides Out" was inspired by the advance publicity for the film of the same name. Though the song does not appear in the film, the single's release was timed to coincide with the film's premiere and the band was invited to the premiere.

Although it seems that no-one involved in the film could quite remember why Leon Greene's dialogue was dubbed by Patrick Allen (including Sarah Lawson, who was married to Allen), Allen himself was quoted as saying it was because Greene, the opera singer, 'sang' his lines and the producers thought they should be delivered in a better manner.

== Themes ==
Unlike other Hammer films, The Devil Rides Out has little sexual or violent content. The film's tone is more serious than many other Hammer titles.

Paul Leggett, in his study of Terence Fisher's films, describes The Devil Rides Out, despite its occult themes, as a "total conquest of Christianity over the forces of evil". Leggett sees the film's script drawing inspiration from the works of Charles Williams and C.S. Lewis in addition to Wheatley's novel. The film portrays in a serious manner a spiritual reality underlying the physical universe, and the sceptics of the supernatural becoming unwitting allies of evil.

Professor Peter Hutchings stated that the film has noticeable paternalistic themes: the struggle between good and evil is set up with the older male "savant" authority figures (Duke de Richleau and Mocata), while the younger characters are incapable of defending themselves without subjecting to their authorities.

== Reception ==
=== Box office ===
According to Fox records the film required $1,150,000 in rentals to break even, but by 11 December 1970 it had only made $575,000, making it a loss to the studio.

=== Critical ===
The Devil Rides Out received positive reviews. On review aggregate site Rotten Tomatoes, the movie has a 96% "Fresh" rating.

Howard Thompson wrote in The New York Times: "[The film] sustains flavor and atmosphere in beautiful color photography[...]. Under Terence Fisher's direction [...] the first 20 minutes are dandy, as a steely aristocrat, played with suave dignity by Christopher Lee, tries to outwit the evil ones[...]. This civilized counterattack [...] and some realistic dialogue, steady the action until a flaring, flapping climax[...]. Aside from Mr. Lee, the acting [...] is much too broad. Still, [...] 'The Devil's Bride' does hold together, and superstitious moviegoers could do a lot worse."

Variety wrote: "Director Terence Fisher has a ball with this slice of black magic, based on the Dennis Wheatley novel. He has built up a suspenseful pic, with several tough highlights, and gets major effect by playing the subject dead straight and getting similar serious performances from his capable cast. Christopher Lee is for once on the side of the goodies."

The Radio Times Guide to Films gave the film 4/5 stars, writing: "Dracula director Terence Fisher does sterling work on this thrilling Hammer adaptation of Dennis Wheatley's tale of good v satanic evil. Christopher Lee, here on the side of the angels, swaps his usual fangs/cloak combo for a goatee and occult savvy as the debonair Duc de Richelieu, who's battling to save a friend from Charles Gray's coven of devil worshippers. Richard Matheson conjures up an intelligent, pacey script to match the menacing atmosphere, while Lee exudes heroic authority in the face of Gray's vulpine villainy."

The Monthly Film Bulletin conversely wrote: "A disappointingly routine version of Dennis Wheatley's black magic thriller. Christopher Lee is as professionally suave as ever as de Richleau and Charles Gray is suitably sinister as the arch-Satanist; and there is the usual attention to period detail that one has come to expect from Hammer (notably a minor concours d'élégance of vintage cars). But the script is very longwinded, and Terence Fisher's direction never takes fire."
