= The Satanist (Wheatley novel) =

1960 novel by Dennis Wheatley

- British first edition cover
- Author: Dennis Wheatley
- Cover artist: Sax
- Language: English
- Genre: Horror fiction, Spy fiction
- Published: 1960, Hutchinson & Co.
- Publication place: United Kingdom

The Satanist is a black magic/horror novel by Dennis Wheatley. Published in 1960, it is characterized by an anti-communist spy theme. The novel was one of the popular novels of the 1960s, popularizing the tabloid notion of a black mass.

== Plot ==
The novel follows on from To the Devil – a Daughter, a successful occult novel from January 1953, later filmed in 1976 and features from the earlier novel Colonel Verney, an anti-Soviet anti-black magic British spymaster. The plot concerns Mary Morden, a young widow, and Verney's special agent Barney Sullivan who infiltrate a satanic cult. In doing so they foil a communist plot to conquer the world.

== Themes ==
The novel presents conservative political and social views, and a conservative picture of the hero's masculinity.

The novel was published by Hutchinson & Co. who coincidentally had published the gothic novel of the same name by Mrs Hugh Fraser in 1912.
