= Curtain of Fear =

1953 novel

- First edition
- Author: Dennis Wheatley
- Language: English
- Genre: Thriller
- Publisher: Hutchinson
- Publication date: 1953
- Publication place: United Kingdom
- Media type: Print

Curtain of Fear is a 1953 thriller novel by the British writer Dennis Wheatley.

During the early stages of the Cold War, a Czech-born British professor attempts to make his escape from Communist Czechoslovakia across the Iron Curtain into the West.

== Bibliography ==
- Reilly, John M. Twentieth Century Crime & Mystery Writers. Springer, 2015.
- Williams, Emma & Sheeha, Iman. Deception: An Interdisciplinary Exploration. BRILL, 2019.
