= The Haunting of Toby Jugg =

1948 novel by Dennis Wheatley

- First edition (publ. Hutchinson)
- Author: Dennis Wheatley
- Language: English
- Publication date: 1948

The Haunting of Toby Jugg is a 1948 psychological thriller novel on an occult theme by English writer Dennis Wheatley, incorporating his usual themes of satanic possession and madness, in what was at that time a fresh situation: a disabled British airman recovering from his experiences in the last stages of World War II, in which he played a part in the bombardment of Germany.

== Plot Summary ==
Toby is the heir to a vast fortune and stands to inherit his grandfather's business empire on his twenty-first birthday. Toby's mother died in childbirth and his father and grandfather were killed in an aircraft accident, leaving his Uncle Paul and Aunt Julia as his only living relatives. While taking part in a bombing raid on Cologne, he is shot in the back. The resulting injury means Toby is paralysed below the waist and uses a wheelchair. At first he goes to live with his uncle and aunt but later is sent to convalesce in Wales with his old school teacher who is also a family friend. It is at this point that the book, which is written as a diary, begins. Toby is being haunted by a many-legged, evil and shadowy presence that the young airman comes to believe is the Devil himself. Helmuth Lisicky, the man in charge of the castle in Wales where Toby is taken to recuperate, proves to be a member of a Satanist brotherhood and sends manifestations against Toby such as a plague of spiders. At first Toby thinks he is hallucinating and then going mad, a view shared by his guardian; finally he believes himself to be at the centre of a sinister plot to cheat him out of his inheritance.

== Adaptations ==
A film based on the book was written and directed by Chris Durlacher. It was produced as a drama by the BBC in 2006, as The Haunted Airman, and aired on BBC Four on 31 October 2006, at 22:00 UTC.
