= The Secret of Stamboul =

- Directed by: Andrew Marton
- Written by: Laslo Benedek; George A. Hill; Noel Langley; Andrew Marton; Richard Wainwright; Howard Irving Young
- Based on: The Eunuch of Stamboul by Dennis Wheatley
- Produced by: Richard Wainwright
- Starring: Valerie Hobson; James Mason; Frank Vosper; Kay Walsh
- Cinematography: Henry Harris
- Edited by: Inman Hunter
- Music by: Allan Gray
- Production company: Richard Wainwright Productions
- Distributed by: General Film Distributors
- Release date: 6 October 1936
- Running time: 83 minutes
- Country: United Kingdom
- Language: English

The Secret of Stamboul (also known as The Spy in White) is a 1936 British thriller film directed by Andrew Marton and starring Valerie Hobson, James Mason and Frank Vosper. It was written by Laslo Benedek, George A. Hill, Noel Langley, Andrew Marton, Richard Wainwright and Howard Irving Young, based from the 1935 novel The Eunuch of Stamboul by Dennis Wheatley. It was made at Shepperton Studios. The screenplay concerns a British agent who tries to thwart a revolution.

After the success of The Spy in Black, also starring Valerie Hobson, the film was re-released as The Spy in White.

== Plot ==
A British agent travels to Istanbul (Stamboul) to try to thwart a revolution.

== Cast ==
- Valerie Hobson as Tania
- Frank Vosper as Kazdim
- James Mason as Larry
- Kay Walsh as Diana
- Peter Haddon as Peter
- Laura Cowie as Baroness
- Cecil Ramage as Prince Ali
- Robert English as Sir George
- Emilio Cargher as Renouf
- Leonard Sachs as Arif
- Andreas Malandrinos as Moltov

== Reception ==
The Monthly Film Bulletin wrote: "The story is simply and clearly developed. There are two good performances: Valerie Hobson as Tania gets right inside her somewhat tedious role; and Frank Vosper as Kazdim, in a remarkable make-up, embodies a terrifying, macabre villain. ... The film will thrill all types of audience. Never dull, often sinister, it is fragrant with the triumph of good over evil."

Kine Weekly wrote: "Cast in the old Lyceum mould, this melodrama is many years behind the times in sentiment, character-drawing and treatment. The idea that all Guards officers are true-blue and that every person by the name of Ali is a lecherous cut-throat, died a lingering death soon after the story first saw the light of day in the 'nineties. Its theatrical histrionics and artless flamboyancy may, however, thrill the industrial element, but outside of un-sophisticated circles it is too much of a museum piece to be regarded as other than a doubtful booking proposition."

The Daily Film Renter wrote: "Presented on hearty lines, with hero emerging triumphant even after being thrown down dizzy depths of oubliette to ocean-bed, action introduces kidnapping, black-jacking and garrotting, and culminates in vigorous shots showing suppression of revolt by power-thirsty potentate. Superbly photographed Stamboul exteriors make attractive canvas, with acting on suitably 'heroic' plane. "
