= Niké Arrighi =

French visual artist and actress (1944–2025)

- Born: 9 March 1944; Nice, German-occupied France
- Died: 12 February 2025 (aged 80); Rome, Italy
- Other names: Princess Niké Arrighi Borghese; Nikki Arrighi; Niké Arrighi
- Occupations: Actress; visual artist
- Years active: 1966–1974 (as actress)
- Known for: The Devil Rides Out, Day for Night, Women in Love
- Website: nikearrighi.com

Princess Niké Arrighi Borghese (born Marcella Arrighi; 9 March 1944 – 12 February 2025), known professionally as Niké Arrighi, was a French visual artist and actress, known for roles in several European horror and art house films in the 1960s and 1970s in addition to work in television.

== Early life ==
Daughter of Italian diplomat and former journalist Count Ernesto Arrighi and Australian prima ballerina and model Eleanora ("Nellie") Douglas Cox, daughter of grazier Douglas Cox, Arrighi was raised in the Vaucluse neighborhood of Sydney, Australia. Her family moved there because her father was the Italian consul. He died when she was young.

== Career ==
Arrighi began her professional career as a fashion model in Paris, then moved to London, where she studied acting at the Royal Academy of Dramatic Art. In 1967 she played the parts of Corinne in The Champions ('Reply Box No.66') and a gypsy girl in The Prisoner ('Many Happy Returns'). After a ten-year career in film and television she retired in the early 1970s to return to art, which she had studied as a young woman. Specializing in copperplate etching and oil painting, she won First Prize for Graphic Art at the 1976 Hong Kong Art Biennial.

== Personal life and death ==
In 1977 she married Prince Paolo Borghese, eldest son of the ill-famed Junio Valerio Borghese. They lived in Hong Kong, where he was an engineer, before moving in 1984 to Italy, where she still resided at Palazzo Borghese in Artena until her death. Her husband died in 1999. They had a daughter, Flavia.

Arrighi died on 12 February 2025 in Rome, at the age of 80. Her sister is Luciana Arrighi.

== Filmography ==
Year	Title	Role	Notes
1967	The Prisoner	Gypsy Girl	episode: “Many Happy Returns”
1967	The Gentle Libertine	Aimee / Mitsou	
1968	Don't Raise the Bridge, Lower the River	Portuguese Waitress	
1968	The Devil Rides Out	Tanith Carlisle	(AKA The Devil's Bride)
1969	Women in Love	Contessa	
1971	Countess Dracula	Gypsy Girl	
1971	Bubù		
1971	Sunday Bloody Sunday	Party Guest #5	
1971	A Season in Hell		
1972	Trois milliards sans ascenseur	Minouche	
1973	Day for Night	Odile, la maquilleuse	
1973	The Last Train	Monique Maroyeur	
1974	The Perfume of the Lady in Black	Orchidea	
1974	Stavisky	Edith Boréal	(final film role)
