= Forbidden Territory =

1934 film

- Directed by: Phil Rosen
- Written by: Alma Reville; Dorothy Farnum
- Based on: The Forbidden Territory by Dennis Wheatley
- Produced by: Richard Wainwright
- Starring: Gregory Ratoff; Ronald Squire; Binnie Barnes; Tamara Desni
- Cinematography: Richard Angst; Charles Van Enger
- Edited by: Hugh Stewart
- Music by: Louis Levy
- Production company: Wainwright Productions
- Distributed by: Gaumont British Distributors
- Release date: 10 December 1934
- Running time: 82 minutes
- Country: United Kingdom
- Language: English

Forbidden Territory is a 1934 British thriller film directed by Phil Rosen and starring Gregory Ratoff, Ronald Squire and Binnie Barnes. It was written by Alma Reville and Dorothy Farnum based on the 1933 novel The Forbidden Territory by Dennis Wheatley.

An Englishman and his son travel to the Soviet Union to rescue a family member being held in prison.

== Plot ==
Aeroplane manufacturer Sir Charles Farringdon travels with his son Michael to Russia, in search of his other son, Rex, believed to have been taken prisoner. Despite the attention of police chief Alexei Leshkin, and with the assistance of Valeria, a singer in love with Michael, they manage to rescue Rex. They cross "forbidden territory", their attempt to escape in a stolen plane failing, but they finally make their way to safety.

== Cast ==
- Gregory Ratoff as Alexei Leshkin
- Ronald Squire as Sir Charles Farringdon
- Binnie Barnes as Valerie Petrovna
- Tamara Desni as Marie-Louise
- Barry MacKay as Michael Farringdon
- Anthony Bushell as Rex Farringdon
- Anton Dolin as Jack Straw
- Marguerite Allan as Fenya
- Boris Ranevsky as Runov

== Release ==
Forbidden Territory was released on December 10, 1934, in the United Kingdom.

Labour MP Neil Maclean requested its banning, protesting in the British Parliament that the film was anti-Russian, and the Friends of Soviet Russia, allied with the Communist Party of Great Britain also requested its banning. Subsequently, the Maryport Communist Party also requested the film's withdrawal claiming it was a "libel on the Soviet working man". The film was approved by the British Board of Film Censors on the basis that there was "no political element in it at all."

The film was re-released in April 1940.

== Reception ==
Kine Weekly wrote: "Here is a spectacular potted serial with a Soviet Russia setting. The atmosphere is colourful and at times convincing, and the story, provided that it is not taken too seriously, and there is not much danger of that, is quite good fun. The acting of a clever cast, which combines a healthy robustness with a certain schoolboy naivete, permits the fantastically thrilling situations to get across in the right spirit."

The Monthly Film Bulletin, reviewing the 1940 reissue, wrote: "The highly improbable plot of this film nevertheless contains enough suspense and excitement to justify its revival."

== Legacy ==
Tony Shaw in his book British Cinema and the Cold War stated that Forbidden Territory provided the groundwork for the cycle of Cold War espionage melodramas that would be released in the 1950s. Specifically, the "typical" Englishman fighting injustices in a foreign geographical and political environment.

== Bibliography ==
- Shaw, Tony (2001). British Cinema and the Cold War: The State, Propaganda and Consensus. I. B. Taurus. ISBN 1-86064-371-X.
