= Dennis Wheatley =

British writer (1897–1977)

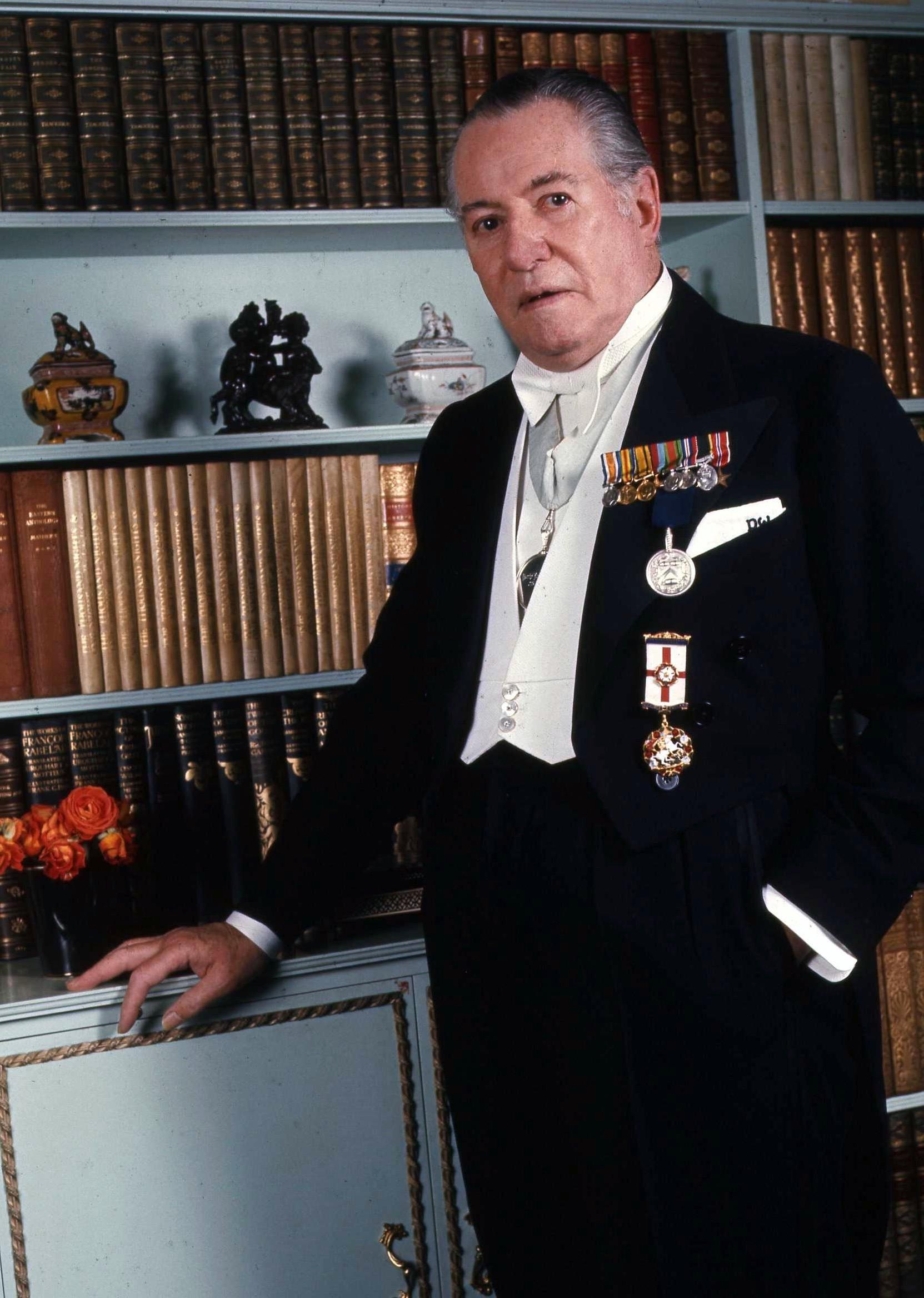
- Portrait by Allan Warren, 1975
- Born: Dennis Yates Wheatley; 8 January 1897; Brixton Hill, London, England
- Died: 10 November 1977 (aged 80); Cadogan Square, Knightsbridge, London, England
- Resting place: Brookwood Cemetery, Brookwood, Surrey, England
- Occupations: Writer; editor
- Writing career
- Period: 1930–1977
- Genres: Adventure, occult, and historical fiction
- Notable works: The Forbidden Territory; The Devil Rides Out

Dennis Yates Wheatley (8 January 1897 – 10 November 1977) was an English writer whose prolific output of thrillers and occult novels made him one of the world's best-selling authors from the 1930s through to the 1960s.

== Early life ==
Wheatley was born at 10 Raleigh Gardens, Brixton Hill, London, the eldest of three children—and only son—of Albert David Wheatley (died 1927) and Florence Elizabeth Harriet (1874-1955), daughter of ironmaster William Yates Baker, of Aspen House, 219, Brixton Hill. Wheatley's father owned Wheatley & Son, a wine business in Mayfair, London. Dennis admitted to having little aptitude for schooling and was later expelled after a few "unhappy years" studying at Dulwich College for allegedly forming a "secret society", as he mentions in his introduction to The Devil Rides Out. Soon after his expulsion, Wheatley became a British Merchant Navy officer cadet on the training ship HMS Worcester.

== Military service ==
Wheatley was commissioned as a 2nd Lieutenant into the Royal Field Artillery during the First World War, receiving his basic training at Biscot Camp in Luton. He was assigned to the City of London Brigade and the 36th (Ulster) Division. Dennis was gassed in a chlorine attack during Passchendaele and was invalided out, having served in Flanders, on the Ypres Salient, and in France at Cambrai and Saint-Quentin.

In 1919 he took over management of the family's wine business. In 1931, however, after his father's death, and with business having declined because of the Great Depression, he sold the firm and began writing. In 1930, his widowed mother married Sir Louis Newton, 1st Baronet, Lord Mayor of London 1923–24.

During the Second World War Wheatley was a member of the London Controlling Section, which secretly coordinated strategic military deception and cover plans. His literary talents led to his working with planning staffs for the War Office. He wrote numerous papers for them, including suggestions for dealing with a possible Nazi invasion of Britain (recounted in his works Stranger than Fiction and The Deception Planners). The most famous of his submissions to the Joint Planning Staff of the war cabinet was on "Total War". He received a direct commission in the JP Service as a Wing Commander, RAFVR, and took part in the plans for the Normandy invasions. After the war Wheatley was awarded the U.S. Bronze Star for his role in the Second World War.

== Writing career ==
Wheatley's first book, Three Inquisitive People, was not published when completed, but came out later, in 1940. However, his next novel made quite a splash. Called The Forbidden Territory, it was an immediate success when issued by Hutchinson in 1933, being reprinted seven times in seven weeks. After finishing The Fabulous Valley, Wheatley decided to use the theme of black magic for his next book. He wrote: "The fact that I had read extensively about ancient religions gave me some useful background, but I required up-to-date information about occult circles in this country. My friend, Tom Driberg, who then lived in a mews flat just behind us in Queen's Gate, proved most helpful. He introduced me to Aleister Crowley, the Reverend Montague Summers and Rollo Ahmed." The release the next year of his occult story, The Devil Rides Out—hailed by James Hilton as "the best thing of its kind since Dracula"—cemented his reputation as "The Prince of Thriller Writers."

Wheatley mainly wrote adventure novels, with many books in a series of linked works. Background themes included the French Revolution (the Roger Brook series), Satanism (the Duke de Richleau series), World War II (the Gregory Sallust series) and espionage (the Julian Day novels). Over time, each of his major series would include at least one book pitting the hero against some manifestation of the supernatural—making them into fantasy and specifically contemporary fantasy. He came to be considered an authority on Satanism, the practice of exorcism, and black magic, toward all of which he expressed hostility. During his study of the paranormal, though, he joined the Ghost Club, a paranormal investigation and research organization that investigates mainly ghosts and hauntings.

In many of his works, Wheatley wove in interactions between his characters and actual historical events and individuals. For example, in the Roger Brook series the main character involves himself with Napoleon and Joséphine whilst spying for Prime Minister William Pitt the Younger. Similarly, in the Gregory Sallust series, Sallust shares an evening meal with Hermann Göring. In They Used Dark Forces, the last book of the Sallust war-time sequence, Göring gets a surprisingly positive depiction as an honourable man who disliked the systematic killing of the Jews (though not actually doing anything to stop it) and who wanted to end the war when realizing that Germany was doomed to lose it; Göring is contrasted with Joseph Goebbels, who according to Wheatley "was on the extreme left" and "took seriously the Socialist part of National Socialism".

During the 1930s, Wheatley conceived a series of mysteries, presented as case files, including testimonies, letters, and pieces of evidence such as hairs or pills. The reader had to inspect this evidence to solve the mystery before unsealing the last pages of the file, which gave the answer. Four of these 'Crime Dossiers' were published: Murder Off Miami, Who Killed Robert Prentice?, The Malinsay Massacre, and Herewith The Clues!.

Wheatley also devised a number of board games including Invasion (1938), Blockade (1939), and Alibi (April 1953).

In the 1960s, Hutchinson was selling a million copies of his books per year, and most of his titles were kept available in hardcover. A few of his books were made into films by Hammer, of which the best known is The Devil Rides Out (book 1934, film 1968). Wheatley also wrote non-fiction works, including an account of the Russian Revolution, a life of King Charles II of England, and several autobiographical volumes.

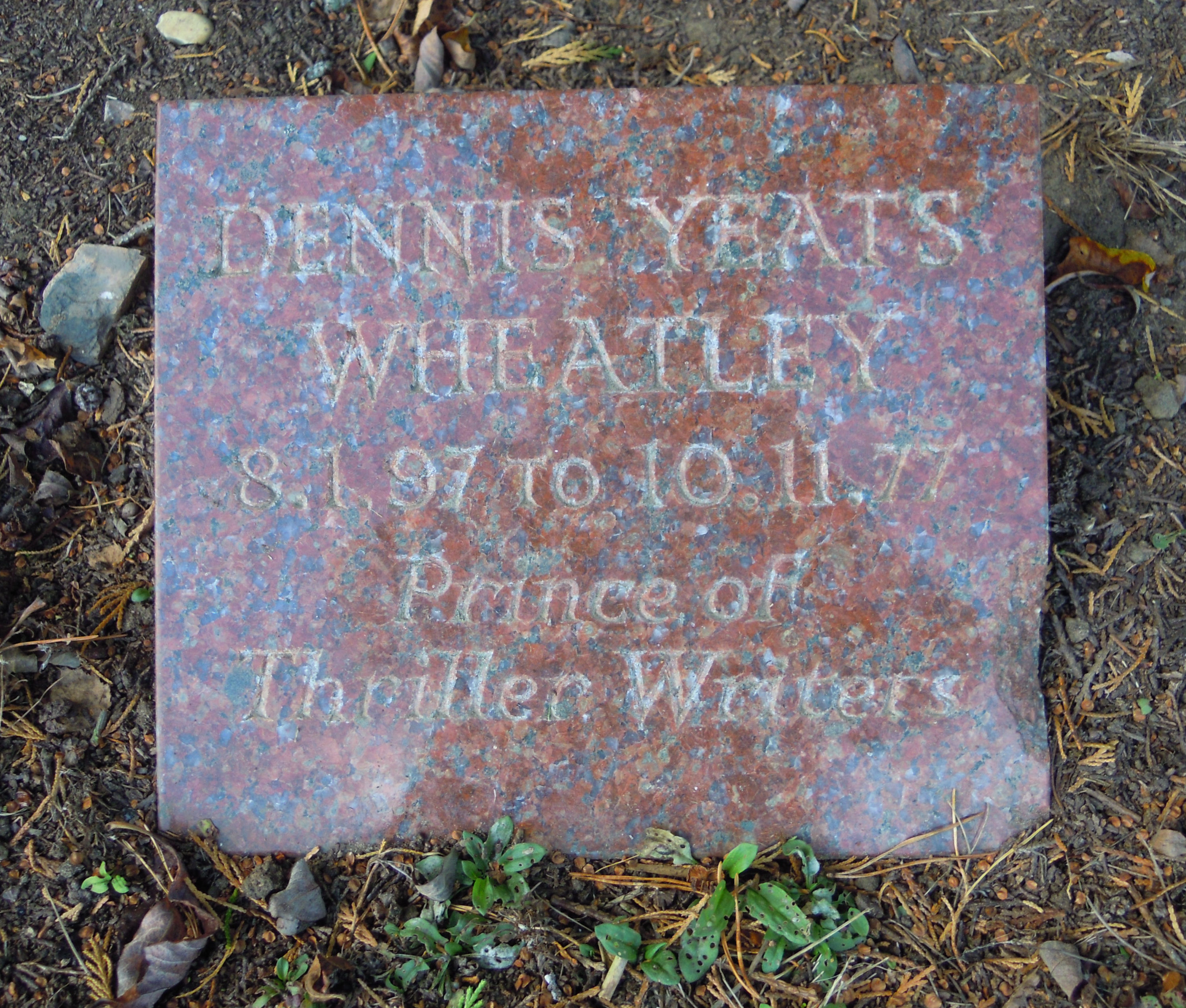
Wheatley's grave in Brookwood Cemetery

He edited several collections of short stories, and from 1974 to 1977 he supervised a series of 45 paperback reprints for the British publisher Sphere with the heading "The Dennis Wheatley Library of the Occult", selecting the titles and writing short introductions for each book. These included both occult-themed novels by the likes of Bram Stoker and Aleister Crowley (with whom he once shared a lunch) and non-fiction works on magic, occultism, and divination by authors such as the Theosophist H. P. Blavatsky, the historian Maurice Magre, the magician Isaac Bonewits, and the palm-reader Cheiro.

Two weeks before his death in November 1977, Wheatley received conditional absolution from his old friend Cyril 'Bobby' Eastaugh, the Bishop of Peterborough. He was cremated at Tooting and his ashes interred at the South Cemetery section of Brookwood Cemetery, under a tall tree near the entrance. He is also commemorated on the Baker/Yates family monument at West Norwood Cemetery.

His estate library was sold in a catalogue sale by Basil Blackwell's in 1979. It suggested a well-read individual with wide-ranging interests, particularly with respect to historical fiction and Europe.

His grandson Dominic Wheatley became one of the co-founders of the software house Domark, which published a number of titles in the 1980s and 1990s.

== Politics ==
Wheatley's work reflects his conservative worldview. His protagonists are generally supporters of the British monarchy, the British Empire and the British class system, and many of his villains are villainous because they attack these ideas. Wheatley was an opponent of Nazism and Communism, believing them to be controlled by Satanic power.

=== Letter to Posterity ===
During the winter of 1947, Wheatley penned 'A Letter to Posterity' and buried it in an urn at his country home. The letter was intended to be discovered some time in the future (it was found in 1969, when the house was demolished for redevelopment of the property). He predicted in it that the socialist reforms, which were introduced by the post-war government, would result inevitably in the abolition of the monarchy, the "pampering" of a "lazy" working class and a national bankruptcy. He advised both passive and active resistance to the resulting "tyranny", including "ambushing and killing of unjust tyrannous officials".

Employers are now no longer allowed to run their businesses as they think best but have become the bond slaves of socialist state planning. The school leaving age has been put up to 16, and a 5 day working week has been instituted in the mines, the railways and many other industries. The doctrine of ensuring every child a good start in life and equal opportunities is fair and right, but the intelligent and the hardworking will always rise above the rest, and it is not a practical proposition that the few should be expected to devote their lives exclusively to making things easy for the majority. In time, such a system is bound to undermine the vigour of the race.

== Posthumous publication ==
From 1972 to 1977 (the year of his death), 52 of Wheatley's novels were offered in a uniform hardcover set by Heron Books UK. (This was in addition to Hutchinson's own "Lymington" library edition, published from 1961 to 1979.) Having brought each of his major fictional series to a close with the final Roger Brook novel, Wheatley then turned to his memoirs. These were announced as five volumes, but were eventually only published as three books, the (fourth) volume concerning the Second World War issued as a separate title. His availability and influence declined following his death, partly owing to difficulties of reprinting his works because of copyright problems.

In 1998 Justerini & Brooks celebrated their upcoming 250th anniversary by revising his last work about their house, The Eight Ages of Justerini's (1965) and re-issuing it as The Nine Ages of Justerini's. The revision by Susan Keevil brought the history up to date.

Wheatley's literary estate was acquired by media company Chorion in April 2008, and several titles were reissued in Wordsworth paperback editions. A new hardcover omnibus of Black Magic novels was released by Prion in 2011.

When Chorion encountered financial problems in 2012, the Rights House and PFD acquired four crime estates from them, including the Wheatley titles. PFD hoped to broker new series for TV and radio, and a move to digital publishing.

In October 2013, Bloomsbury Reader began republishing 56 of his titles; many of these will be edited and abridged. However, many of them will also have new introductions evaluating Wheatley's work, including some written by his grandson, Dominic Wheatley. These are to be available in both printed format and as ebooks.

== In fiction ==
In Stephen Volk's novella Netherwood, part of Volk's 2018 book The Dark Masters Trilogy, set in 1947, a fictional version of Wheatley is involved in black magic by Aleister Crowley.

== Works ==
All titles in this list (up to the end of the 'Short Story Collection' section) were made available in the 1970s Heron hardback edition, except for the titles marked with an 'X'.

=== Duke de Richleau series ===
- The Forbidden Territory (Adventure, January 1933) – filmed in 1934
- The Devil Rides Out (Occult/Romance, December 1934) – filmed in 1968
- The Golden Spaniard (Adventure, August 1938)
- Three Inquisitive People (Crime, February 1940)
- Strange Conflict (Occult, April 1941)
- Codeword – Golden Fleece (Espionage, May 1946)
- The Second Seal (Historical/Espionage, November 1950)
- The Prisoner in the Mask (Historical/Espionage, September 1957)
- Vendetta in Spain (Historical/Espionage, August 1961)
- Dangerous Inheritance (Crime, August 1965)
- Gateway to Hell (Occult, August 1970)

=== Gregory Sallust series ===
- Black August (Science Fiction/Adventure, January 1934)
- Contraband (Espionage, October 1936)
- The Scarlet Impostor (Espionage, January 1940)
- Faked Passports (Espionage, June 1940)
- The Black Baroness (Espionage/Crime, October 1940)
- V for Vengeance (Espionage, March 1942)
- Come into My Parlour (Espionage, November 1946)
- The Island Where Time Stands Still (Espionage, September 1954)
- Traitors' Gate (Espionage, September 1958)
- They Used Dark Forces (Espionage/Occult, October 1964)
- The White Witch of the South Seas (Crime/Occult, August 1968)

=== Julian Day series ===
- The Quest of Julian Day (Adventure/Romance, January 1939)
- The Sword of Fate (Adventure/Romance, September 1941)
- Bill for the Use of a Body (Crime, April 1964)

=== Roger Brook series ===
- The Launching of Roger Brook (Historical/Espionage, July 1947)
- The Shadow of Tyburn Tree (Historical/Espionage, May 1948)
- The Rising Storm (Historical/Espionage, October 1949)
- The Man Who Killed the King (Historical/Espionage, November 1951)
- The Dark Secret of Josephine (Historical/Espionage, March 1955)
- The Rape of Venice (Historical/Espionage, October 1959)
- The Sultan's Daughter (Historical/Espionage, August 1963)
- The Wanton Princess (Historical/Espionage, August 1966)
- Evil in a Mask (Historical/Espionage, August 1969)
- The Ravishing of Lady Mary Ware (Historical/Espionage, August 1971)
- The Irish Witch (Historical/Espionage/Occult, August 1973)
- Desperate Measures (Historical/Espionage, September 1974)

=== Molly Fountain and Colonel Verney novels ===
- To the Devil – a Daughter (Occult, January 1953) (filmed in 1976)
- The Satanist (Occult, August 1960)

=== Stand-alone occult novels ===
- The Haunting of Toby Jugg [Toby Jugg] (Occult, December 1948) (filmed in 2006 as The Haunted Airman)
- The Ka of Gifford Hillary [Gifford Hillary] (Occult/Science Fiction, July 1956)
- Unholy Crusade ['Lucky' Adam Gordon] (Historical Adventure/Occult, August 1967)

=== Science fiction novels ===
- They Found Atlantis [Camilla and others] (Lost World, January 1936)
- Uncharted Seas [(Lost World] (January 1938) (filmed in 1968)
- Sixty Days to Live (X). [Lavina Leigh and others] (End of the world, August 1939)
- The Man Who Missed the War (X). [Philip Vaudell] (Lost World, (November 1945)
- Star of Ill-Omen (X). [Kem Lincoln] (Aliens, May 1952)

=== Adventure/espionage novels ===
- Such Power is Dangerous [Avril Bamborough] (Adventure, Lost World June 1933)
- The Fabulous Valley [The Heirs of John Thomas Long] (Adventure, August 1934)
- The Eunuch of Stamboul [Swithin Destime] (Espionage, July 1935) – filmed in 1936 as Secret of Stamboul
- The Secret War [Sir Anthony Lovelace, Christopher Pen, Valerie Lorne] (Espionage, January 1937)
- Curtain of Fear [Nicholas Novák] (Espionage, October 1953)
- Mayhem in Greece [Robbie Grenn] (Espionage, August 1962)
- The Strange Story of Linda Lee [Linda Lee] (Crime/Adventure, August 1972)

=== Short story collections ===
- Mediterranean Nights There are three versions of this collection. The original version was issued in 1943, and was reprinted several times. It had 21 stories. Version two, an Arrow paperback edition, contained an introduction and six new stories: "The Worm That Turned", "The Last Card", "A Bowler Hat for Michael", "The Suspect", "Murder in the Pentagon" and "The Pick-up". The story in version one called 'The Terrorist' is omitted, making 26 stories in all. Version three appeared in the Lymington Edition of Wheatley's works in 1965. It has an abridged version of the introduction to version two. It includes all the stories in version two, and restores "The Terrorist" from version one, for a total of 27 stories.
- Gunmen, Gallants and Ghosts (X). There are also three versions of this collection. The original version was issued in 1943, and was reprinted several times. It had 17 stories. Version two came out in the Arrow paperback edition, 1963 and later. It omits the "Bombing of London" written for Alfred Hitchcock, and adds one story "In the Fog", and two items which are collections of articles, "Voodoo" and "Black Magic", for a total of 19 stories/items. It has a new introduction, identical to the one in version two of Mediterranean Nights. Version three appeared in the Lymington Edition of Wheatley's works in 1965. It has a brief new introduction, made up mostly of material removed from the intro to version two of MN to make the intro to version three of MN. It includes all items from version two, and restores the "Bombing of London", for a total of 20 items.

=== Non-fiction ===
- Old Rowley: A Private Life of Charles II (September 1933)
- Red Eagle: The Story of the Russian Revolution and of Klementy Efremovitch Voroshilov, Marshal and Commissar for Defence of the Union of Socialist Soviet Republics (October 1937)
- The Devil and all his Works (September 1971)

=== 'War papers and autobiography ===
- Total War (December 1941)
- Stranger than Fiction (February 1959)
- Saturdays with Bricks: And Other Days Under Shell-Fire (March 1961)
- The Time Has Come ... : The Memoirs of Dennis Wheatley: The Young Man Said 1897–1914 (1977)
- The Time Has Come ... : The Memoirs of Dennis Wheatley: Officer and Temporary Gentleman 1914–1919 (1978)
- The Time Has Come ... : The Memoirs of Dennis Wheatley: Drink and Ink 1919–1977 (1979)
- The Deception Planners: My Secret War (August 1980)

=== Privately printed ===
- The Seven Ages of Justerini's (1749–1949) (1949)
- Of Vice and Virtue (1950)
- The Eight Ages of Justerini's (1749–1965) (1965)
- The Nine Ages of Justerini's: A Celebration of 250 Years (1998, revised and updated by Susan Keevil)
- Julie's Lovers (2022)
- Dennis Wheatley: An Unpublished Miscellany (2023)

=== Crime dossiers (with J. G. Links) ===
- Murder off Miami (July 1936)
- Who Killed Robert Prentice? (June 1937)
- The Malinsay Massacre (April 1938)
- Herewith the Clues! (July 1939)

=== Edited by ===
- A Century of Horror Stories (October 1935)
- A Century of Spy Stories (June 1938)

=== Board games ===
- Invasion (1938)
- Blockade (1939)
- Alibi (1953)

== Influence ==
Wheatley's Gregory Sallust series has been cited as an inspiration for Ian Fleming's James Bond stories.

== Film adaptations ==
- Forbidden Territory (November 1934)
- Secret of Stamboul; US title The Spy in White (adaptation of The Eunuch of Stamboul; October 1936)
- The Devil Rides Out; US title The Devil's Bride (July 1968)
- The Lost Continent (adaptation of Uncharted Seas; July 1968)
- To the Devil...a Daughter (March 1976)
- The Haunted Airman (adaptation of The Haunting of Toby Jugg; October 2006)

== Biography ==
- Baker, Phil, The Devil is a Gentleman: the Life and Times of Dennis Wheatley, Sawtry, UK: Dedalus. 2009. ISBN 978-1903517758
- Cabell, Craig, Dennis Wheatley: Churchill's Storyteller, Staplehurst, UK: Spellmount. 2005. ISBN 978-1862272422
