= They Used Dark Forces =

- First edition
- Author: Dennis Wheatley
- Language: English
- Genre: World War II novel
- Publisher: Hutchinson
- Publication date: 1964
- Publication place: United Kingdom
- Media type: Print (Hardback)
- Pages: 511 pp
- ISBN: 0-7493-0677-7
- OCLC: 24669314
- Dewey Decimal: 823.912
- LC Class: PZ3.W5592 Ti PR6045.H127

They Used Dark Forces is the final part of Gregory Sallust's wartime experiences. In this novel Sallust is sent to investigate rumours of a German superweapon being built in Peenemünde. He is wounded following an air raid and encounters Ibrahim Mallacou, a Jewish Satanist who uses hypnotism to relieve his pain whilst treating his injuries. He encounters Mallacou again when he is trapped in Poland attempting to smuggle out parts of a V1 rocket. After several adventures including imprisonment and dinner with Hermann Göring the unlikely pair find themselves in Hitler's bunker during the siege of Berlin where they attempt to persuade him to take his own life rather than fight on.

While essentially a spy thriller on the very concrete background of Nazi Germany in the last part of WWII, the book has a considerable fantasy element. It assumes that Satan actually exists and that he endows his follower Mallacou with supernatural powers, especially telepathy and the ability to correctly predict the future – which becomes essential in later parts of the book's plot.

There is also a science fiction element, clearly modelled on H. G. Wells' War of the Worlds. Having gained the confidence of Hitler in his Berlin bunker, Sallust tells Hitler of the Martians planning an invasion of Earth with their super weapons, and convinces Hitler that he is fated to be reincarnated as a Martian, become the leader of the invasion of Earth and in that way achieve the complete world conquest which eluded him in his present life. Enchanted by this vision, Hitler becomes reconciled to dying when the Soviets occupy Berlin, rather than escaping the city to continue resisting in South Germany – which might have considerably prolonged the war and entailed many more casualties. That, of course, was Sallust's exact purpose in concocting the Martian fairy tale.

== Links to other Gregory Sallust stories ==
This novel concludes the stories of Obergruppenführer Grauber, Sallust's long term opponent, Graf von Ostenburg, the husband of Gregory's beloved Erica, and of his occasional lover Sabine.

== Alternative course of the Second World War ==
While mainly concerned with the actual course of World War II and referring to many actual battles and moves of the years 1943–1945, embedded in the plot is an effective alternative history depicting how Nazi Germany could have won the war. It is set out in a very long monologue attributed to Hermann Göring (see Operation Felix). It assumes that in mid-1941 Goering convinces Hitler to drop the idea of invading the Soviet Union. Germany sticks to its 1939 non-aggression treaty with the Soviets, leaving Britain to go on fighting alone without allies. Instead, Germany directs its military might in the diametrically opposite direction. First, the German Army enters Spain, either getting Franco's consent or turning Spain into another Nazi-occupied country. Gibraltar is occupied and the Mediterranean closed to British shipping. Then the Germans move further southwards and in a swift move occupying the whole of Africa.

As noted by the book's Goering, the French colonies are controlled by the collaborator Vichy government which would impose no hindrance, Belgian and Portuguese forces in these countries' colonies are negligible and in the British colonies, military forces are designed to maintain colonial rule, not to resist an all-out German invasion. German forces would be able to swiftly reach South Africa, whose army would also be no match for the German army. South Africa would surrender after some bombing of Johannesburg and Pretoria, and part of the Afrikaner population would welcome German rule. With German fighter planes and U-boats based all along the West African coast, the Cape Route would be closed to British shipping. Britain would not be able to supply its forces in the Middle East, and would be largely cut off from India, Australia and New Zealand – which would be accessible only by the very long roundabout route across both the Atlantic and the Pacific – and there British shipping would run the gauntlet of Imperial Japanese naval and air power. Under such circumstances, Britain might be forced to end the war and recognize the fait accompli of German hegemony.
