= A Season in Hell (1971 film) =

- Directed by: Nelo Risi
- Written by: Giovanna Gagliardo; Raffaele La Capria
- Starring: Terence Stamp; Pier Paolo Capponi; Niké Arrighi; Jean-Claude Brialy; Florinda Bolkan
- Cinematography: Aldo Scavarda
- Edited by: Roberto Perpignani
- Music by: Maurice Jarre
- Distributed by: Gaumont (France); United Artists (U.S.)
- Release date: 1971 (Italy)
- Running time: 130 minutes
- Countries: Italy; France
- Languages: Italian; English

A Season in Hell (French: Une saison en enfer, Italian: Una stagione all'inferno) is a 1971 French-Italian drama film directed by Nelo Risi. The film tells the life and death of the poet Arthur Rimbaud and his troubled relationship with the poet Paul Verlaine until the African adventure in Ethiopia.

== Plot ==
1871. As soon as he arrived at the age of seventeen in Paris, Arthur Rimbaud was hosted by the poet Verlaine, struck by some poems previously sent to him by Rimbaud. Verlaine soon realizes that he is dealing with a genius, founder of a new and ruthless model of poetics and writing and is completely entranced, to the point of spending much of his time with him rather than with his wife.

Soon this friendship turns into homosexual love and the people, including his wife, do not look favorably on it, so much so that the two poets are forced to settle in England. After a couple of years of stormy life spent there, Rimbaud and Verlaine quarrel for the last time; As Arthur returns to his family farm in the countryside, Verlaine is arrested for attempted murder.

After a few months Verlaine discovers that Arthur has gone to Ethiopia, in Africa, to fulfill his dream. In the place the poet writes the most beautiful compositions, in the company of a black girl who assists and cares for him, until Rimbaud falls seriously ill. He blames a tumor in his leg and is forced to return to France to have it amputated. His illness gets worse and worse, until he dies in 1891.

== Cast ==
- Terence Stamp as Arthur Rimbaud
- Jean-Claude Brialy as Paul Verlaine
- Florinda Bolkan as Gennet
- Niké Arrighi as Mathilde Verlaine
- Pier Paolo Capponi
- Pascal Mazzotti
- William Sabatier
- Gabriella Giacobbe
- Joshua Sinclair as Arthur Rimbaud (child)

== See also ==
- Total Eclipse (1995)
- List of Italian films of 1971
