= The Haunted Airman =

2006 British film by Chris Durlacher

- Film poster
- Based on: The Haunting of Toby Jugg by Dennis Wheatley
- Screenplay by: Chris Durlacher
- Directed by: Chris Durlacher
- Starring: Robert Pattinson; Rachael Stirling; Julian Sands
- Music by: Daniel Pemberton
- Country of origin: United Kingdom
- Original language: English

Production
- Producer: Chris Durlacher
- Cinematography: Jeff Baynes
- Editor: Jake Martin
- Running time: 68 minutes
- Production company: BBC

Original release
- Network: BBC Four
- Release: 31 October 2006

The Haunted Airman is a psychological thriller film first aired on BBC Four on 31 October 2006. Adapted from Dennis Wheatley's 1948 novel The Haunting of Toby Jugg, it was directed by Chris Durlacher and starred Robert Pattinson in the title role, with Rachael Stirling and Julian Sands in supporting roles.

== Plot ==
During the Second World War, young pilot RAF Flight Lieutenant Toby Jugg (Robert Pattinson) suffers a serious spinal injury during a bombing raid on the city of Dresden. (Note: Jugg is a decorated (DFC) pilot in the famed Dambusters squadron and is known as the "bomber baron" in newspaper accounts.) This injury confines him to a wheelchair, facing a life as a paralyzed recluse. In the hope that he can recover, his aunt-in-law, Julia (Rachael Stirling), takes him to Llancebach, a remote military hospital in Wales run by Dr. Hal Burns (Julian Sands), known for his unorthodox treatment methods.

Toby's stay as a convalescent, surrounded by shell-shocked military veterans, leads him to new terrors, especially after other patients suddenly die. Dr. Burns implores him to confront his demons, but during the night, Toby starts suffering from horrific nightmares, reliving the terrible carnage he had created. Reoccurring hallucinations and visions begin to cloud his mind. His only outlet is his cigarettes and the doting attention of nurse, Sister Sally Grant (Melissa Lloyd).

Julia, with whom Toby was having an affair, seems to be the only person he trusts. When an intern at the nursing home goes to the nearby town, he brings a letter from Julia to Toby, who now knows that Dr. Burns is hiding his correspondence with his aunt. At his request, Julia moves into the hospital in order to treat her ward, but Dr. Burns begins an intemperate affair with her.

One night, the doctor gives a drugged Toby a razor and tells him "to do the right thing". When he rejects any further help from Dr. Burns, Toby subsequently begins to suffer from psychological disorders. Doubting everyone and everything, Toby conjures up a sinister plot involving Julia and Dr. Burns, but in his madness, kills the one person who loves him.

== Cast ==
- Robert Pattinson as Toby Jugg
- Rachael Stirling as Julia Jugg
- Julian Sands as Dr. Hal Burns
- Scott Handy as Squadron Leader Peter Enfield
- Melissa Lloyd as Sister Sally Grant
- Daniel Ainsleigh as Pilot Officer
- Peggy Popovic as Little Girl
- Robert Whitelock as Commando

== Soundtrack ==
The Haunted Airman : Soundtrack

Soundtrack album by Daniel Pemberton
- Released: 9 November 2009 (U.S.)
- Recorded: Various times
- Genre: soundtrack
- Length: 25:48
- Label: 1812 Recordings
- Producer: Daniel Pemberton

The soundtrack was composed by Daniel Pemberton. It was released by 1812 Recordings on 9 November 2009.

=== Soundtracks listing ===
| No. | Title | Music | Length |
|---|---|---|---|
| 1. | "The Haunted Airman (Theme)" | Daniel Pemberton | 1:36 |
| 2. | "Arrival of Toby Jugg" | Daniel Pemberton | 0:38 |
| 3. | "Something Is Happening" | Daniel Pemberton | 1:47 |
| 4. | "Massage" | Daniel Pemberton | 0:41 |
| 5. | "Letter Reading" | Daniel Pemberton | 1:34 |
| 6. | "Bathtime" | Daniel Pemberton | 2:09 |
| 7. | "Hidden Love" | Daniel Pemberton | 0:45 |
| 8. | "Workout" | Daniel Pemberton | 1:28 |
| 9. | "Loss of Control" | Daniel Pemberton | 2:14 |
| 10. | "Spiders" | Daniel Pemberton | 3:35 |
| 11. | "Toby and Julia Drink" | Daniel Pemberton | 1:32 |
| 12. | "Hal With Razor" | Daniel Pemberton | 1:46 |
| 13. | "Love and Sex" | Daniel Pemberton | 1:03 |
| 14. | "Final Confrontation" | Daniel Pemberton | 3:08 |
| 15. | "The Haunted Airman (Ending)" | Daniel Pemberton | 1:47 |
| Total length: | | | 25:48 |

== Production ==
"The Haunting of Toby Jugg" by the late prolific author Dennis Wheatley was loosely adapted for the screen. The elements of horror and the supernatural that where most evident in the gripping novel were diluted in favour of a screenplay that focused more on the psychological thriller aspects.

== Reception ==
The Haunted Airman received negative reviews from critics. David Nusair's review for reelfilm identified the inadequacy of the plot: "... The end result is a hopelessly uninvolving piece of work that is unlikely to appeal to even the most ardent Pattinson fan, with the short running time unable to disguise the aggressively underdeveloped nature of its pointless premise." Reviewer Tom Elce simply called the film "heavy-handed" "... mediocrity".

Other critical reviews found that the lead character had some redeeming qualities. Film critic Staci Layne noted: "Pattinson is fine. He does what he always does: Broods. He also smokes a lot of cigarettes while brooding." In a more positive review, The Stage praised the production, considering it a "very disturbing, beautifully made and satisfyingly chilling ghost story"... and praised Pattinson by saying that "... (he) played the airman of the title with a perfect combination of youthful terror and world weary cynicism."

== Home media ==
The Haunted Airman in DVD format was released by Revolver Entertainment on 6 April 2009. On 13 October 2009, Entertainment One released the DVD in Canada and the United States.

== Notes ==
=== Bibliography ===
- Baker, Phil. The Devil is a Gentleman: The Life and Times of Dennis Wheatley. London: Dedalus Limited, 2010. ISBN 978-1-9035-1775-8.
