= The Eunuch of Stamboul =

1935 novel

- First edition
- Author: Dennis Wheatley
- Language: English
- Genre: Spy thriller
- Publisher: Hutchinson
- Publication date: 1935
- Publication place: United Kingdom
- Media type: Print

The Eunuch of Stamboul is a 1935 spy thriller novel by the British writer Dennis Wheatley. A British army officer is forced to resign his commission to avoid a diplomatic incident. He is dispatched to Istanbul and uncovers a plot to overthrow the government of Mustafa Kemal Atatürk and restore a traditionalist sultanate, led by a eunuch who serves as a senior secret policeman in the present government.

== Film adaptation ==
The following year it was made into a film The Secret of Stamboul, directed by Andrew Marton and starring James Mason, Valerie Hobson and Kay Walsh.

== Bibliography ==
- Goble, Alan. The Complete Index to Literary Sources in Film. Walter de Gruyter, 1999.
- Reilly, John M. Twentieth Century Crime & Mystery Writers. Springer, 2015.
- Tougher, Shaun. The Eunuch in Byzantine History and Society. Routledge, 2009.
