= The Devil Rides Out =

1934 novel by Dennis Wheatley

- First edition
- Author: Dennis Wheatley
- Publisher: Hutchinson
- Publication date: 1934
- Media type: Hardcover
- Pages: 318

The Devil Rides Out is a 1934 horror novel by Dennis Wheatley, telling a disturbing story of black magic and the occult. The four main characters, the Duke de Richleau, Rex van Ryn, Simon Aron and Richard Eaton, appear in a series of novels by Wheatley. A serialised version appeared, begun in The Daily Mail in 1934. The book was made into a film by Hammer Film Productions in 1968. There is also an abridged, young adult version "retold" by Alison Sage for the "Fleshcreepers" series (1987).

== Plot ==
Set in 1930s London and Southern England, Duc de Richleau and Rex van Ryn rescue their friend Simon Aron from a devil-worshipping cult. Rex falls in love with another initiate of the cult, Tanith. Rex prevents Tanith from going to a ceremony on Salisbury Plain. The Duc and Rex rescue Simon from the ceremony.

The groups escapes to the home of the Eatons, friends of Richleau and van Ryn, and are followed by the group's leader, Mocata, who has a psychic connection to the two initiates. After visiting the house to discuss the matter and an unsuccessful attempt to influence the initiates to return, Mocata forces Richleau and the other occupants to defend themselves through a night of black magic attacks. During this Mocata summons the Angel of Death using the medium of Tanith. The defeat of the Angel results in Tanith's death.

After successfully defending themselves through the night the group find that Mocata has kidnapped the Eatons' daughter. Simon exchanges himself for her. Mocata is using Simon to find the Talisman of Set, a powerful satanic object. The book culminates in a desperate chase across Europe to an abandoned Greek Monastery where Mocata is defeated. The group wake up in the Eatons' home and realise that during the ceremony they entered the fourth dimension. Mocata is found dead outside the house. The Duc wakes up clutching the Talisman and destroys it. Tanith is found to be alive - Mocata's soul has been exchanged for hers.

== Reception and influence ==
James Hilton, reviewing The Devil Rides Out, described it as "The best thing of its kind since Dracula".

Celia Rees stated in an interview that she had read The Devil Rides Out as a teenager. She added that she listed it (along with the Pan Book of Horror Stories) among the books as "that have influenced her own writing the most."

== Film ==
In 1968, the novel was made into a film by the British film company Hammer Film Productions. It starred Christopher Lee as de Richleau and Charles Gray as Mocata.
