= Roger Brook =

First book in series

Roger Brook is a fictional secret agent and gallant of the Napoleonic Wars who is later identified as the Chevalier de Breuc, created by Dennis Wheatley in 1947. His series covers events from a dozen years before the French Revolution to the fall of Napoleon. The series is written from Brook's perspective, who is an aide-de-camp to Napoleon himself.

== Creation and conception ==
Roger Brook was created after Wheatley had been a member of Winston Churchill's Joint Planning Staff during World War II. During that period, Wheatley had accumulated much distinctive knowledge on matters relevant to the war and politics, but he was not allowed to use this knowledge in his novels because of the Official Secrets Act. He discussed the subject with Air Commodore Kenneth Collier who came up with a suggestion about placing Wheatley's stories in the Napoleonic times instead.

Wheatley combined his habit of doing extensive research, in this case to gather accurate historical details about the Napoleonic era, with his wartime knowledge and experience. However, although broadly accurate, the historiographic aspect of the books is very outdated to a modern reader. After completing the final book in the series, Desperate Measures in 1974, Wheatley decided to retire from writing fiction.

== Appearances ==
Roger Brook appears in twelve books which, with the dates first published and the period covered by each book, are:

- The Launching of Roger Brook (3 July 1947) covers 28 July 1783-November 1787
- The Shadow of Tyburn Tree (6 May 1948) March 1788-April 1789
- The Rising Storm (13 October 1949) April 1789-July 1790
- The Man Who Killed the King (8 November 1951) June 1792-August 1794
- The Dark Secret of Josephine (16 March 1955) August 1794-April 1796
- The Rape of Venice (19 October 1959) June 1796-December 1797
- The Sultan's Daughter (19 August 1963) February 1798-31 December 1799
- The Wanton Princess (22 August 1966) 1 January 1800-30 November 1805
- Evil in a Mask (18 August 1969) February 1807-September 1809
- The Ravishing of Lady Mary Ware (16 August 1971) September 1809-1 January 1813
- The Irish Witch (20 August 1973) 1812-1814
- Desperate Measures (2 September 1974) 1814-1815
