= The Forbidden Territory =

1933 novel by Dennis Wheatley

- First edition cover
- Author: Dennis Wheatley
- Publisher: Hutchinson
- Publication date: 1933

The Forbidden Territory is a novel by British writer Dennis Wheatley, published by Hutchinson in 1933. His first published novel, it was an instant success and was translated into a number of languages. Alfred Hitchcock quickly bought the film rights.

== Plot summary ==
The Duke de Richleau receives a letter that is a code from his missing friend the young American Rex Van Ryn, who hunted for treasure lost during the Soviet takeover of Russia, but who is now in prison somewhere in that vast country. He shares the letter with another young friend, Simon Aron, who agrees to accompany him to search for their friend.

== Publication history ==
- Wheatley, Dennis (1933). The Forbidden Territory. Hutchinson.

== Film adaptation ==
The novel was bought for adaptation to film by Richard Wainwright for Alfred Hitchcock to direct. Hitchcock was unable to be released from other film projects at Gaumont-British studios. The film was directed Phil Rosen and was released in 1934, distributed by Gaumont-British Picture Corporation. Its main actors were Gregory Ratoff, Ronald Squire, and Binnie Barnes.
