= Arich Anpin =

Kabbalah aspect of Divine emanation

Arich Anpin or Arikh Anpin (Aramaic: אריך אנפין meaning "Long Face/Extended Countenance" (also implying "The Infinitely Patient One") is an aspect of Divine emanation in Kabbalah, identified with the sephirah attribute of keter, the Divine Will. It is one of the five (or six) partzufim described in the Idrot.

The Zohar's imagery expounds its role in Creation, where it is the macroscopic equivalent of Zeir Anpin (Microprosopus) in the sephirotic tree of life. In 16th-century Lurianic doctrine, it becomes systemised as one of the six primary partzufim divine countenances, as part of the cosmic process of tikkun rectification. The Lurianic scheme recasts the linear Medieval-Kabbalistic hierarchy of lifeforce in Creation into dynamic processes of interinclusion, analogous to the enclothement of a soul into a lower body. In this way, the Partzuf Arich Anpin is said to descend immanently through all levels of Creation as their concealed substratum Divine intention, though in progressively more concealed mode.

Its inner dimension is identified as the related, but transcendent partzuf Atik Yomin ("Ancient of Days"), synonymous with inner Divine Delight, the "Will of Wills/Primary Will", the most pristine cause for Creation.

== Two Partzufim-Configurations and three Reishin-Heads in Keter-Crown ==
The sefirah of Keter (above-conscious Divine "Crown") develops into two Partzufim (Configurations): Arich Anpin, its outer extending Ratzon (Will), and Atik Yomin ("Ancient of Days"), its inner motivating Divine Taanug (Delight). As man is seen as "made in the Divine image", Divinity is perceived through psychological awareness of the Divine Kochos HaNefesh (Human Soul Powers) articulated in Hasidic thought.

In Kabbalah the functional role of the sephirot and partzufim in enacting Creation is explored. The 7 lower emotional sefirot of Zeir Anpin enclothe within Arich Anpin, as God's essential delight motivates the Will to Create. The 3 upper intellectual sefirot of Atik Yomin, transcending Arich Anpin, are the Divine source of Emunah (Faith) through essential unity with the essence of the soul. Together, three levels, arising from the overlapping of the two Partzufim of Keter, form the three Reishin (Heads) of Keter. The Lurianic Tikun rectification process of the world of Atzilut begins with its Keter-"Crown". The crown of a world is its essential "head" of which the Zohar says analogously, "When the head/leader of the people is rectified, the entire people is rectified". The three heads of Keter in Atzilut:

- Reisha d'lo Ityada, acronym RADL"A, (the "Unknowable Head"), Unity source of essential faith
- Reisha d'Ayin (the "Head of Nothingness"-Ayin), source of the inner motivation of unconscious Delight
- Reisha d'Arich (the "Extended/Infinite Head"), leading Arich Anpin, the outer descending extension of Will

The consciousness of the World of Atziluth-Emanation, highest of the Four Worlds, is still completely nullified within its Divine source, perceiving no self existence. Only in the lower three Worlds does Creation feel progressive degrees of independence from God. Where lower Creation perceives plurality in Divinity, Atzilut perceives only complete Divine Unity. Consequently, any revelation of Divinity in plural categories: 10 Sephirot, 12 Partzufim, 2 forms of Divine Light, 2 Partzufim and 3 Heads in Keter, 4 letters of the Tetragrammaton, 5 levels of the soul, 13 Attributes of Mercy etc. are only the apparent perspective from below. In reality, Divinity reveals itself through any and all numbers, while retaining Omnipresence from the perspective of Upper Divine Unity. After the Tzimtzum appearance of Divine Withdrawal, when Creation receives its own perspective, Divinity can appear through plurality. All such forms when traced back to their ultimate source in God's infinite light before the Tzimtzum, return to their state of absolute Oneness. Kabbalah repeatedly stresses the need to divest its anthropomorphic metaphors from any false, corporeal connotations. According to Kabbalah and Jewish faith, God is absolutely One. There exists no duality or plurality in Him in any form at all. The relationship between God and His attributes is emphasised in the Zohar section Patach Eliyahu, "You are One, but not in number...All is to show how You conduct the world, but not that you have...any of these attributes at all." In Kabbalah the paradoxical perception of absolute Divine Unity within multiplicity, the consciousness of Atzilut, is considered subconsciously innate to the souls of Israel, that are rooted in Atzilut. The souls of the Nations are elevated to this perception through adherence to the 7 Laws of Noah that attach them to the absolute Divine Unity in the Torah and away from any false plural perspective of idolatry.

== The Thirteen attributes of Mercy ==
The Aramaic term Arich Anpin derives from the Hebrew phrase Erech Apaim ("slow to anger" - literally "long nose"), one of the Thirteen Attributes of Mercy enumerated in Exodus 34:6-7. Arich ("long") implies the infinite extension of Divine Will in Creation, while "long nose" also implies "long breath" (the opposite of impatient "short breath"). Arich Anpin denotes the extension of infinite patience and mercy. The thirteen principles of Divine mercy are symbolized in Kabbalah by the thirteen parts of the Dikna ("Beard") of Arich Anpin, each a channel of rectification (Tikunai Dikna) The "hairs" of the beard symbolise Tzimtzum (Constriction), individual powers to contract the infinite light of Arich Anpin so that it can be received by lower Creation, bestowing upon them infinite mercy. The seventh (mid-part) in the thirteen attributes of mercy (v'emet - "truth" in the listing of Kabbalah), are the "cheeks/face" of Arich Anpin not covered by "hair"; the light of Arich Anpin shining without constriction. "Truth" in both Jewish law and Kabbalah denotes continuation without being affected by change.

== Arich Anpin-Long Face and Zeir Anpin-Short Face ==
As the operative Divine Will through Creation, Arich Anpin (Macroprosopus) acts as the soul descending within and guiding the Divine Intellect and Emotions. In parallel lesser process, Zeir Anpin (Microprosopus) acts as the revelation of Divine Delight and Will, through Da'at (the sephirah of "Knowledge", the Lower counterpart of Keter) into emotional expression. This becomes the soul within the ultimate realisation of creation into action, through Nukvah ("Feminine" the Partzuf of Malchut). As Keter and Daat are two dimensions of the same principle, they are alternately listed among countings of the 10 Sephirot, becoming Da'at Elyon and Da'at Tachton (Higher, concealed Knowledge and Lower, revealed Knowledge).

== See also ==
- Atik Yomin
- Partzufim
- Zeir Anpin

== Sources ==
Mystical Concepts in Chassidism, Jacob Immanuel Schochet, Kehot pub. Also printed as Appendix of Likutei Amarim-Tanya, Kehot. Chapter 8 etc.
