= Ancient of Days =

Name for God in the Book of Daniel

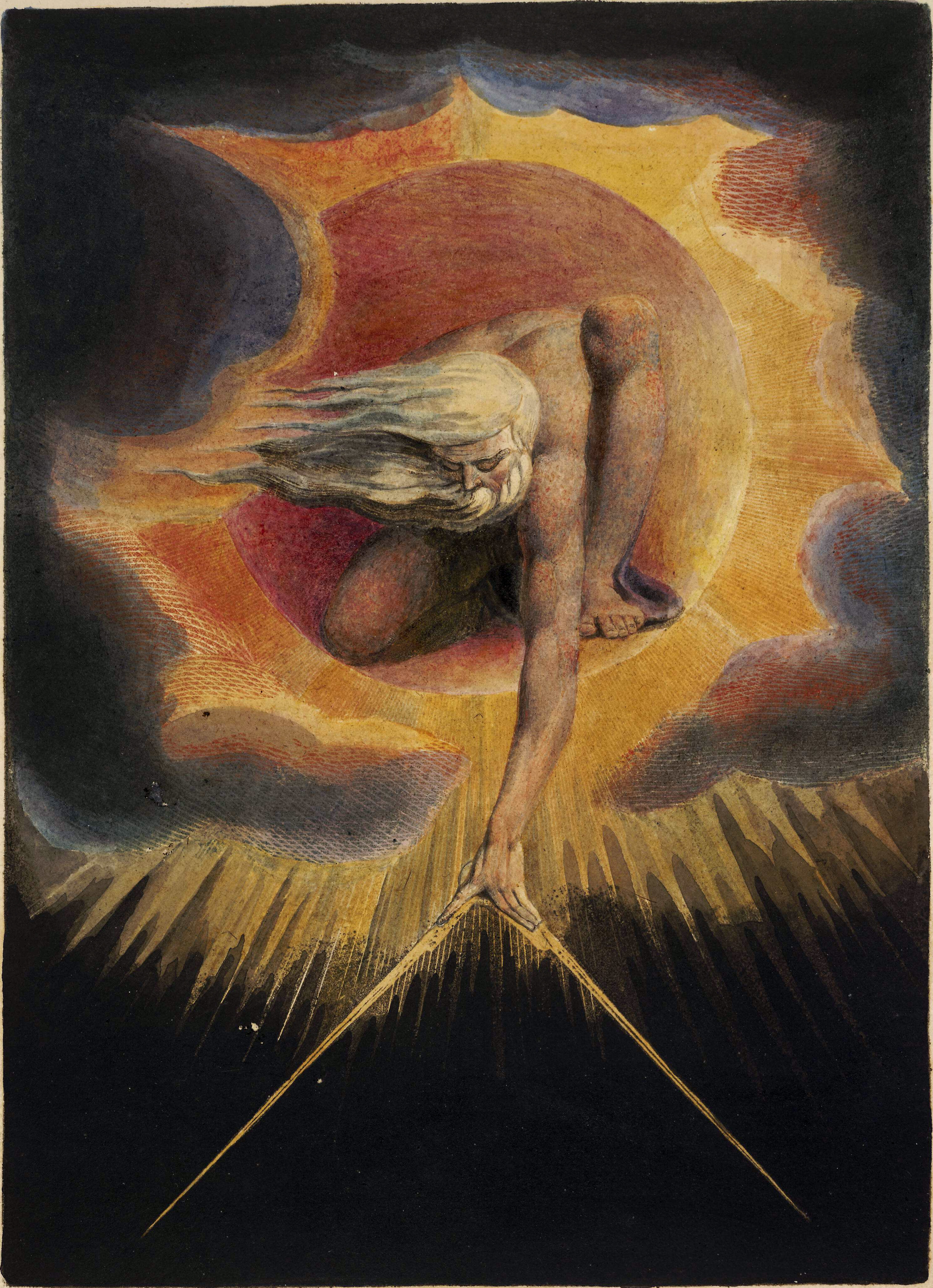
The Ancient of Days (1794). Watercolor etching by William Blake. For Blake, however, this was a title of Urizen (the demiurge in his prophetic books).

Ancient of Days (Note: Jewish Babylonian Aramaic: עַתִּיק יֹומִין, romanized: ʿattiq yomin or Jewish Babylonian Aramaic: עַתִּ֤יק יֽוֹמַיָּא֙, romanized: ʿattiq yomayyā; Koine Greek: παλαιὸς ἡμερῶν, romanized: palaiòs hēmerôn or ὁ παλαιὸς τῶν ἡμερῶν, ho palaiòs tôn hēmerôn; Latin: antiquus dierum) is a name for God in the Book of Daniel. The title "Ancient of Days" has been used as a source of inspiration in art and music, denoting the creator's aspects of eternity combined with perfection. William Blake's watercolour and relief etching entitled The Ancient of Days is one such example.

== Judaism ==
This term appears three times in the Book of Daniel (7:9, 13, 22), and is used in the sense of God being eternal.

I beheld till the thrones were cast down, and the Ancient of Days did sit, whose garment was white as snow, and the hair of his head like the pure wool: his throne was like the fiery flame, and his wheels as burning fire.

— Daniel 7:9

=== Kabbalah ===
In the Zohar, the seminal document of Kabbalah that emerged in 13th-century Spain, there is mention of the Ancient of Ancients, and the Holy Ancient One – Atika Kadisha, variably interpreted as synonymous with the Ein Sof, the unmanifested Godhead. The Ancient of Days is the manifestation of the Ancient of Ancients within Creation. It refers to the most primary ("ancient") source of creation in the divine will Keter ("Crown").

Whenever Judgment looms and the forehead of the Impatient One is revealed, the Forehead of the Ancient of Ancients is revealed; Judgment subsides and is not executed.

— Idra Rabba, Zohar 3:136b

In 16th-century Lurianic Kabbalah, Atik Yomin is systemised as the uppermost Partzuf (Divine "Countenance/Configuration") in the rectification of the World of Atzilut ("Emanation") after the "Shattering of the sephirot Vessels". Keter of Atzilut acts as the guiding Divine motivation in creation, developing into two partzufim, Atik Yomin (Ancient of Days) and Arich Anpin ("Long Visage/Infinitely Patient One"). Atik Yomin is the inner partzuf of Keter, synonymous with Divine Delight, that enclothes within and motivates Arich Anpin, the outer partzuf of Keter, synonymous with Divine Will. Arich Anpin is said to extend down all levels of Creation in ever more concealed mode as the divine substratum of everything. The Zohar goes into great detail describing the White Head of God and ultimately the emanation of its anthropomorphic personality or attributes. In the descending realms explained by Luria, the Gulgalta ("Skull"-Keter Will) within Arich Anpin enclothes the Chesed (Kindness) of Atik Yomin, becoming the origin of the lights of the world of Atzilut; the Mocha Stima'ah ("Concealed Brain"—Chokmah Wisdom) within Arich Anpin enclothes the Gevurah (Severity) of Atik Yomin, becoming the origin of the vessels of the world of Atzilut. The Dikna ("Beard") of Arich Anpin constricts the infinite light originating from Atik Yomin in 13 channels of rectification to lower, relatively finite reality. The Merkabah text Re'uyot Yehezkel identifies the Ancient of Days as Metatron.

== Christianity ==
=== Eastern Christianity ===
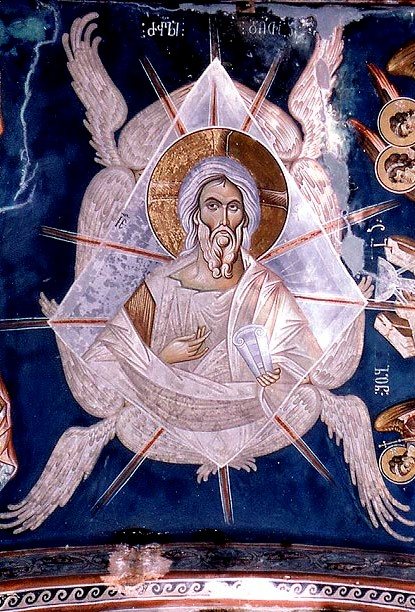
The Ancient of Days, a 14th-century fresco from Ubisi, Georgia, painted by Damiane.

In Eastern Orthodox Christian hymns and icons, the Ancient of Days is sometimes identified with God the Father or occasionally the Holy Spirit; but most properly, in accordance with Orthodox theology he is identified with God the Son, Jesus Christ.

Most of the eastern church fathers who comment on the passage in Daniel (7:9–10, 13–14) interpreted the elderly figure as a prophetic revelation of the Son before his physical incarnation.

Eastern Christian art will sometimes portray Jesus Christ as an old man, the Ancient of Days, to show symbolically that he existed from all eternity, and sometimes as a young man, or wise baby, to portray him as he was incarnate. This iconography emerged in the 6th century, mostly in the Eastern Roman Empire with elderly images, although usually not properly or specifically identified as "the Ancient of Days." The first images of the Ancient of Days, so named with an inscription, were developed by iconographers in different manuscripts, the earliest of which are dated to the 11th century. The images in these manuscripts included the inscription "Jesus Christ, Ancient of Days," confirming that this was a way to identify Christ as pre-eternal with the God the Father. Indeed, later, it was declared by the Russian Orthodox Church at the Great Synod of Moscow in 1667 that the Ancient of Days was the Son and not the Father.

=== Western Christianity ===
In the Western Church similar figures usually represent only God the Father. Thomas Aquinas, for example, identifies the Ancient of Days with God the Father, quoting Hilary of Poitiers' comment that "eternity is in the Father".

The Book of Daniel also contains a reference to "someone like a son of man", who is brought up close before the Ancient of Days, and to whom are given "rulership and dignity and kingdom, that the peoples, national groups and languages should all serve even him" (Daniel 7:13–14). Some Christian commentators have understood this to describe God the Father bestowing rulership over an everlasting kingdom upon Jesus (who is often called "the Son of man"), which would suggest that the Ancient of Days is not identical with Jesus. It has been noted that "Daniel's vision of the two figures is the only one in which the two divine persons are seen face to face".

Among ancient Jewish pseudepigrapha, the Book of Enoch states that he who is called "Son of man," who existed before the worlds were, is seen by Enoch in company with the "Ancient of Days".

In the hymn "Immortal, Invisible, God only Wise" (lyrics Walter C. Smith, 1867), the last two lines of the first verse read:

Most blessed, most glorious, the Ancient of Days,
Almighty, victorious, Thy great Name we praise.

In the hymn "O Worship the King" (lyrics Robert Grant, 1833), the last two lines of the first verse read:

Our shield and defender, the Ancient of Days,
pavilioned in splendor and girded with praise.

=== Latter-day Saints ===
In the Church of Jesus Christ of Latter-day Saints, the title Ancient of Days belongs to Adam, the oldest and earliest man, who is also identified with the archangel Michael.

== Urantia ==
According to the Urantia Book, the Ancients of Days are an order of celestial beings created by the Trinity to serve in groups of three as the rulers of the seven superuniverses of time and space.

The Ancients of Days were all trinitized at the same time. They represent the beginning of the personality records of the universe of universes, hence their name — Ancients of Days. When you reach Paradise and search the written records of the beginning of things, you will find that the first entry appearing in the personality section is the recital of the trinitization of these twenty-one Ancients of Days.

— The Urantia Book 18:3.4 (209.6)

== See also ==
- Abatur—Ancient of Days in Mandaeism
- God the Father

== General and cited references ==
- Cartlidge, David R.; Elliott, J. K. (2001). Art and the Christian Apocrypha. Routledge. ISBN 978-0-415-23392-7.
- Scott, Michael (2009). The Sorceress. Delacorte Press. ISBN 978-0-385-73529-2.
- The Urantia Book, Urantia Foundation, 2019, ISBN 978-0-911560-07-7
