= Atzmus =

Divine essence in Kabbalah

Atzmus or Atzmut (עצמות from the Hebrew עצם etzem) is the descriptive term referred to in Kabbalah, and explored in Hasidic thought, for the divine essence.

Classical Kabbalah predominantly refers to the Godhead in Judaism with its designated term "Ein Sof" ("No end"-Infinite). Reference to atzmus is usually restricted in Kabbalistic theory to discussion whether "Ein Sof" represents the ultimate divine being in itself, or to God as first cause of creation.

== Background ==
=== Perceptions of God in Jewish philosophy and Kabbalah ===
Medieval Jewish philosophers like Maimonides, articulate a transcendent negative theology where it is only possible to describe God in terms of what He is not. Here divine unity means that God's singularity is unique and bears no relation to any concept one can conceive. Kabbalah, influenced by the philosophical argument, but seeking the Biblical God who is also immanent, gives a different, more radical solution. It distinguishes between God in Himself and in His emanations. The infinite divine, the Ein Sof ("Limitless") is beyond all understanding, description or manifestation. Only through the 10 Sephirot divine attributes is God revealed to creation, and the sustaining lifeforce that continuously recreates existence is channeled. The final sephirah Malchut (Kingship) becomes the feminine Shechina (divine presence), the immanent indwelling divinity in creation. In manifestation God is anthropomorphically described as both male and female, where male denotes outward giving and female denotes inward nurturing.

In Kabbalah there are traces of panentheism, such as the Zohar's description of the two forms of sustenance, the "light that surrounds" and the "light that fills" all worlds, and Moshe Cordovero's description of panentheism in his 16th-century quasi-rational hierarchical systemisation of Kabbalah. Cordovero reconciles previous opinions regarding the divine nature of the sephirot by describing them as lights invested in vessels. Only the vessels differentiate, while the light, originating from the Ein Sof, is undifferentiated, removing any notion of plurality, in the manner water pours into different coloured vessels or light streams through different colours of glass. Regarding perception of divinity, influenced by the negative theology of the philosophers, Cordovero says:

Whenever one forms a conceptual image of God, he should immediately backtrack, recoiling from the false notion, as any notion is shaped by man's spatial world. Rather, he should "run and return" towards imagining divinity, and then rejecting it.

In Lurianic Kabbalah the first act of creation is the primordial Tzimtzum (self "withdrawal") of God, to resolve the problem of how finite creation could emerge from the infinite. Beforehand, the Ohr Ein Sof fills all reality, nullifying potential creation into non-existence. The tzimtzum constitutes a radical leap, withdrawing the infinite light into God, to allow the latent potentially finite light to emerge, from which Creation unfolds. Subsequently, the sephirot reconfigure as Partzufim, recasting Cordovero's linear hierarchy with one of enclothement, allowing lower creation to conceal within it higher divine origins.

== Habad view of Atzmus ==
The school of Habad, founded by Schneur Zalman of Liadi (1745–1812), differed from mainstream Hasidism in seeking to intellectually articulate Hasidic thought in systematic study, with the mind as the route to the heart. Consequently, it retained the mystical ideal of communicating as widely as possible the elite nullification of Creation in Divine Unity.

== See also ==
- Godhead (Judaism)
- Divine Providence and Unity in Hasidism
