= Partzufim =

Particular reconfigured arrangements of the ten sefirot

Partzufim or Partsufim (Hebrew: פרצופים, singular partzuf, Hebrew: פרצוף, from Greek: πρόσωπον prósopon "face" or "mask"), are "countenances" or "personas" of God described in the Zohar.

The terms used for partzufim appear in the following texts of the Zohar: Sifra de'Tzniuta (the Book of Concealment), the Idra Rabba, and the Idra Zuta. The Idra Rabba describes a divine being composed of three partzufim: Arikh Anpin, the “Long-Faced One” or “Slow to Anger”; Zʿeir Anpin, the “Small-Faced One” or “Short-Tempered”; and Nukvah, the feminine aspect of the Divine. Although one can observe expression of certain sefirot in the partzufim, the Idra Rabba makes no attempt to bring these two paradigms into alignment. The Idra Zuta describes five partzufim, the aforementioned three and two additional ones Abba (Father) and Imma (Mother), forming an “inner” divine “family” within the Godhead.

The symbolic language of the Idrot entered mainstream Kabbalah after their adoption by Isaac Luria. In Lurianic Kabbalah, the partzufim are reconfigured arrangements of the ten sefirot, the divine attributes or emanations. Each partzuf is thus a configuration of disparate entities into a harmonious unit. Their full doctrinal significance emerged in Lurianic Kabbalah in the 16th century concerning The World of Chaos and The World of Rectification. The Lurianic system describes the dynamic relationships between personas, which interact. The higher partzufim clothe themselves within the lower ones as a soul is in a body.

== Lurianic system ==
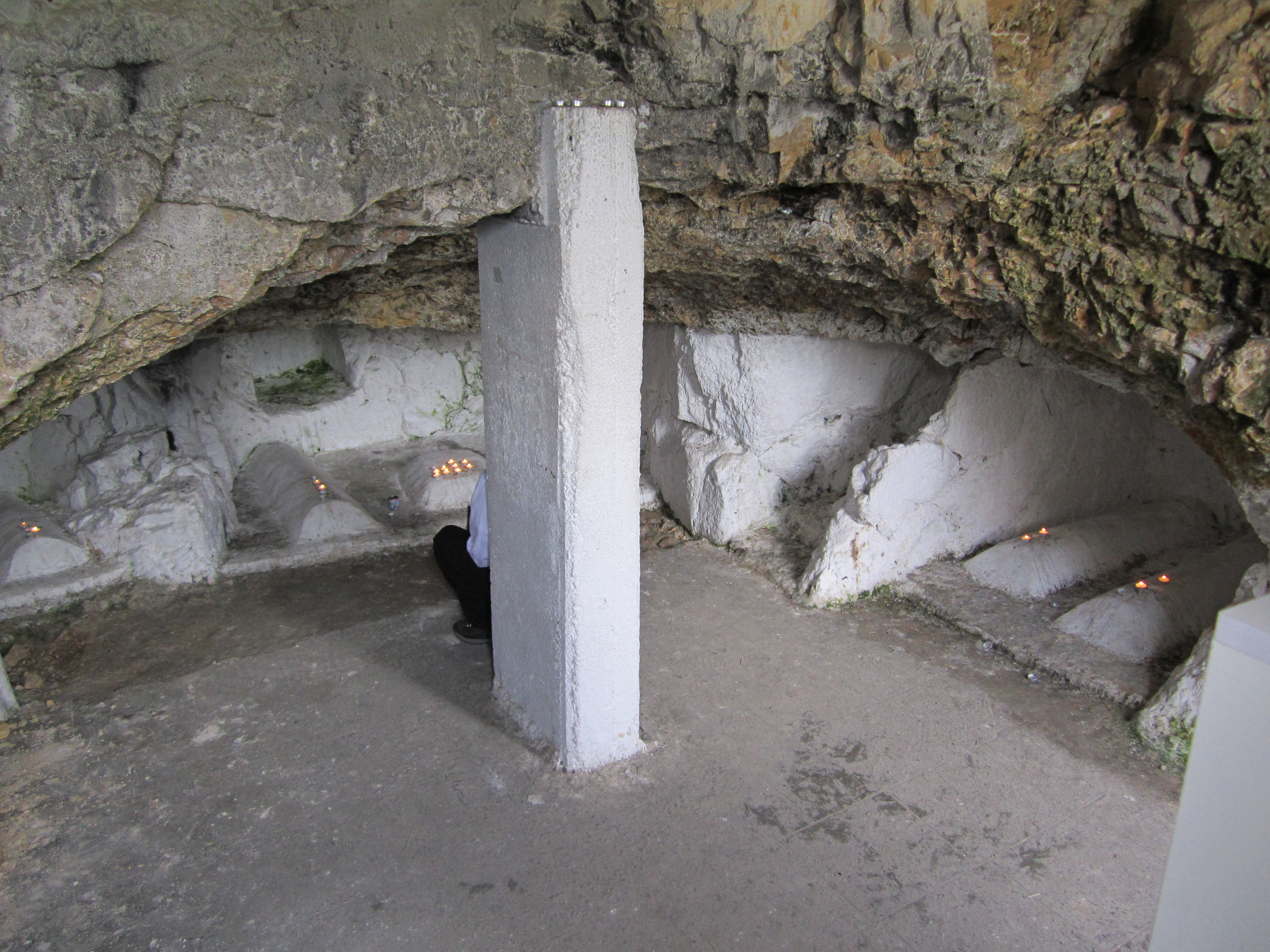
Traditional location of the Idra Assembly. In the Zohar, Shimon bar Yohai convenes his students to expound the partzufim. Later, Isaac Luria, who systemised the partzufim, convened his students there, each one sitting in the location of their former incarnation

In Lurianic Kabbalah, the Four Worlds of our created existence are arranged in a stable form, through the reconfiguration of the original sefirot into partzufim. Their reformation as partzufim in the World of Rectification begins tikkun olam, cosmic repair. As a result of the collapse of the World of Chaos, sparks of holiness were lost or exiled in the three lower Worlds. The human, whose soul reflects the harmonised order of the partzufim, rectifies the mundane world by redeeming the exiled sparks of holiness through Torah study and performance of mitzvot.

The first realm to exhibit this new arrangement is the mature form of Atziluth, the World of Emanation, therefore also called the World of Rectification. This follows on from the Shevirah "Shattering" of the sefirot vessels in the World of Chaos, the initial, unstable form of Atziluth. In Tikun, the sefirot evolve into the harmonised partzufim, new arrangements where they can unite. The World of Chaos is characterised by abundant light (Ohr) and weak vessels, as the ten sefirot act independently as absolute forces, causing it to collapse. The World of Rectification is characterised by lower lights in strong vessels, as through the partzufim the sefirot inter-relate to absorb the illumination from Chaos . The task of humanity becomes the rectification of the fallen sparks of Chaos, the concealed sublime origins of lower Creation, latently active in their exiled state. The messianic goal is the union of the original great illumination of Chaos within the mature vessels of Rectification, revealing the ultimate divine essence of both.

=== Anthropomorphism of the partzufim ===
As Medieval Kabbalists never tire of stressing the unity and non-plurality in the concept of the sefirot, so Luria stressed the metaphorical nature of the partzufim. They are Divine "faces", manifestations of the Godhead, alternative aspects through which God manifests Himself, and do not imply any plurality in God. As Shimon bar Yochai recounts in the Zohar:

Whatever I said of the Atika Kadisha, Holy Ancient-One, and whatever I said of the Zeir Anpin, is all One; everything is absolutely One. There is no division in Him, blessed be He and blessed be His Name forever. The sum of all this is: the Ancient of the Ancient and the Zeir Anpin are absolutely One. All is, was, and shall be; He will not change, He is unchanging, and he has not changed...Should you ask, what then is the difference between one and the other? It is all One, but from above His paths divide and from below judgement is found; from our perspective they differ one from another.

== Primary and secondary partzufim ==
The ten sefirot develop into five or six primary partzufim, which further develop into pairs of Male and Female secondary partzufim. The male principle in Kabbalah metaphorically denotes outward/emanator/giver, and the female principle denotes inward/receiver/nurturer, similar to the female process of pregnancy to nurture subsequent emanation. The terminology and system of partzufim describes detailed and specific aspects of Divinity, their nature and function discussed in Kabbalah.

=== Primary partzufim ===
The fundamental primary partzufim and the sefirot they develop from are:

- Ancient of Days/Atika Kadisha, supreme "earliest/oldest" inner dimension of Keter Will (from Ein Sof)
- Arich Anpin - "Long Face/Extending Patience", infinitely extending downwards source of divine compassion in Keter Will
- Abba - "Father", Chokmah illumination of Wisdom insight, root of intellect on the "right" of the sefirot (Revelation)
- Imma - "Mother", Binah intellectual Understanding nurturing pregnant emotions, on the "left" side of the sefirot (Internalisation)
- Zeir Anpin - "Small Face/Short Patience", Son, 6 sefirot emotions that shattered, born from Imma on "left" side (Judgement)
- Nukvah - "Female" of Zeir Anpin, Daughter, Malkuth reign in Feminine Shekhinah, born from Zeir Anpin on "left", man reunites

=== Full array of partzufim ===
The full array of primary partzufim and the secondary partzufim that develop from them:

Sephirot: Unstable separated forces	Partzufim: Stable harmonised reconfigurations	Secondary Partzufim: Particular Male/Female subdivisions
Above conscious: Keter	Ancient of Days; Atika Kadisha; Inner level of Keter-Delight; Most primary earliest cause Arich Anpin ("Long Face/Macroprosopus"); Outer level of Keter-Will; Descending Divine soul in Creation	[Atik Yomin is Male "Ancient of Days"] Nukvah d'Atik Yomin ("Female of Ancient of Days") [Arich Anpin is Male "Long Face"] Nukvah d'Arich Anpin ("Female of Long Face")
Wisdom: Chokhmah	Abba Ila'ah ("The Higher Father"); The power to spontaneously extract insight from the superconscious realm Yisrael Saba ("Israel the Elder"); The power to subsequently direct insight into consciousness Abba ("Father"); The combination of Abba Ila'ah and Yisrael Saba	Both partzufim of Chokhmah are male. For their female counterparts see primary partzufim of Binah
Understanding: Binah	Imma ("Mother"); Joined influence with Abba-Father; Nurturing development Tevunah ("Comprehension")	Both partzufim of Binah are female. For their male counterparts see primary partzufim of Chokhmah
6 Emotional Attributes: Chesed; Gevurah; Tiferet; Netzach; Hod; Yesod	Zeir Anpin ("Small Face/Microprosopus"); Youthful of Days; Revealed Ben ("Son"); Groom seeking unity with Nukvah; Torah study/Written Torah/Sun/tree of life Revelation of Divine transcendence-Tetragrammaton "The Holy One Blessed be He"	Both partzufim of Zeir Anpin are male and have their female counterparts in Nukvah Yisrael (named after "Jacob-Israel"); The face that looks up Yaakov (named after "Jacob", father of Israelites)
Active Emotion: Malkuth	Nukvah/No"k d'Zeir Anpin ("Feminine" of Zeir Anpin); Receiving Bat ("Daughter"); Bride seeking unity with Zeir Anpin; Prayer/Oral Torah/Moon/tree of the knowledge of good and evil Immanence-Elohim; Shekhinah-Indwelling Divine Presence	Both partzufim of Nukvah are female and have their male counterparts in Zeir Anpin Leah (named after First wife of Jacob) Rachel (named after Second wife of Jacob)

Both of the secondary, male and female partzufim of Atik Yomin and Arich Anpin exist within the same configuration. There are therefore only 10 distinct secondary partzufim, and consequently the secondary partzufim of Keter do not have particular names, unlike the secondary partzufim of the others sefirot.

== Manifestations ==
The 6 primary and 12 secondary partzufim are the basic harmonised Divine manifestations in the Four Worlds of created existence. More specifically however, within their interaction are numerous more particular aspects of Divinity, each denoting a differentiated expression. In the Idrot narratives of the Zohar, Shimon bar Yochai discusses profound manifestations of the partzufim. The Idra Zuta, traditionally ascribed to his day of passing from this world, the Hillula of Rabbi Shimon bar Yochai, is considered the deepest teachings of the Zohar.

== Image gallery ==
The partzufim, 3 Reishin and 13 attributes - Tikunai Dikna from Cabala Denudata, 1684, by Knorr von Rosenroth. Jewish works avoid drawing personifications.

== See also ==
- Anthropomorphism in Kabbalah
- Isaac Luria
