= Zeir Anpin =

Aspect of God in Kabbalah

Ze`ir Anpin (Aramaic: זְעֵיר אַנפִּין meaning "Lesser Countenance/Small Face", is a revealed aspect of God in Kabbalah, comprising the emotional sephirot attributes: Chesed, Gevurah, Tiphereth, Netzach, Hod and Yesod.

The Zohar's imagery expounds its role in Creation, where it is the microscopic equivalent of Arich Anpin (Macroprosopus) in the Sephirotic tree of life. The Sifra D'Tzniuta portrays it as the revealed face of God, and the Idra Rabba elaborates on the Kabbalistic significance of its several attributes. In 16th century Lurianic doctrine it becomes systemised as one of the 6 Primary Partzufim Divine Personae, as part of the cosmic process of Tikkun Rectification.

== Uniting Zeir Anpin-Short Face with Nukvah-Female ==
Zeir Anpin, the emotional sephirot centered on Tiferet (Beauty), is the transcendent revelation of God to Creation ("The Holy One Blessed Be He"), a perceptible manifestation of the essential Divine infinity (the Tetragrammaton name of God). Nukvah ("Female" of Zeir Anpin) is the indwelling immanent Shekhinah (Feminine Divine Presence) within Creation, the concealed Divine finitude (the name Elokim). In Medieval Kabbalah, the sin of Adam, as well as later sin, introduces apparent separation (perceived from Creation) between the two, bringing exile and constriction on High. The task of man is restoring union (Yichud) to the Male and Female Divine manifestations. This is the origin of the Kabbalistic prayer formula recited before performing a Jewish observance. Within the tetragrammaton, the first two letters signify the Concealed World/Upper Unity with God, and the latter two signify the Created World/Lower Unity:

"For the sake of the union of the Holy One Blessed be He, and His Shekhinah, to unite the name Y-H with V-H in a perfect union, in the name of all Israel"

In Lurianic Kabbalah, the origin of disharmony in the Sephirot is located earlier, in the primordial Realm of Tohu before the creation of Man, though later sin brings further exile. The task of man, while also affecting Male-Female union on High, involves Messianic redemption of the exiled "Sparks of Holiness" (Birur) from Tohu that are scattered within Physical existence. Birur becomes the inner dimension of Yichud. Each indwelling spark is relatively female in relation to the person who redeems it from captivity. The collectivity of all sparks, similar to the collective People of Israel, also comprises the exiled Shekhinah, awaiting raising up to God.

== See also ==
- Yetzirah
- Partzufim
- Arich Anpin
- Nukvah
