= Divine providence in Judaism =

Orthodox Judaism's view(s) on providence

Divine providence (Hebrew: הַשְׁגָּחָה פְּרָטִי, romanized: Hašgāḥā pərāṭī, lit. 'divine supervision of the individual', Ashkenazi Hebrew pronunciation: IPA haʃ.ɡɔ.ˈχɔ prɔ.ˈti) is discussed throughout rabbinic literature in classical Jewish philosophy and Jewish mysticism.

The discussion brings into consideration the Jewish understanding of nature, and its reciprocal, the miraculous. This analysis thus underpins much of Orthodox Judaism's worldview, particularly regarding interaction with the natural world and the consequences of hishtadlut (השתדלות, choices and personal efforts.

== Classical Jewish philosophy ==
Divine providence is discussed by all of the major Jewish philosophers, but its extent and nature are a matter of dispute. There are, broadly, two views, differing largely as to the frequency with which God intervenes in the natural order. The first view is the rationalist view, which does not deny the occurrence of miracles but attempts to limit them, rationalize the numerous miraculous events related in the Hebrew Bible and bring them within the sphere of the natural order. The second admits a frequency of miracles. Here, there is a stability of the natural order which nevertheless allows for the interference of God in the regulation of human events, or even in disturbing the natural order on occasion.

=== Maimonides ===
Maimonides is representative of the rationalists. He holds that the pattern of nature is basically immutable. "This Universe remains perpetually with the same properties with which the Creator has endowed it ... none of these will ever be changed except by way of miracle in some individual instances". This notwithstanding, Maimonides believes that God rewards and punishes appropriately.

To some extent, Maimonides reconciles the two views by defining providence as an essentially natural process. Here, individual providence depends on the development of the human mind: that is, the more a man develops his mind, the more he is subject to the providence of God. Providence is, in fact, a function of intellectual and spiritual activity: it is the activity, not the person that merits providence. "Divine Providence is connected with Divine intellectual influence, and the same beings which are benefited by the latter so as to become intellectual, and to comprehend things comprehensible to rational beings, are also under the control of Divine Providence, which examines all their deeds in order to reward or punish them."

In accordance with his approach, Maimonides views the material rewards and punishments of the Torah as not the "ultimate" reward and punishment. Rather, the primary purpose of blessings such as wealth and peace is to enable a person to engage in mitzvah performance and study of wisdom without distractions, and by doing so, to merit the World to Come, which constitutes the ultimate reward of closeness to God.

By defining providence as function of human activity, Maimonides avoids the problem of how God can be affected by events on Earth, lessening any implication of change within God and the resultant implication of a lack of perfection (see divine simplicity).

=== Nachmanides ===
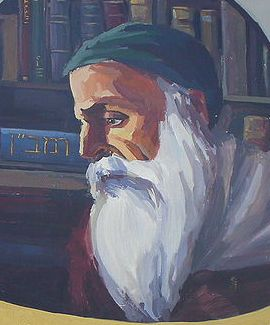
Nachmanides

The teachings of Nachmanides are largely representative of the second view. He holds that God endowed the universe with physical properties, and sustains the natural order, and that any act of providence involves, by definition, an intrusion into the laws of nature. In the absence of providential interference, causality governs the affairs of the universe. In his view, reward and punishment, as well as guidance of the fate of the Jews, are the typical expressions of such providence in the Torat Hashem Temimah. In this sense, there is no difference between God causing it to rain (as a reward) and his splitting of the Red Sea, both are the result of Divine intervention:

And from the great and well-known miracles [e.g. the Exodus] a man comes to admit to hidden miracles which are the foundation of the whole Torah. A person has no portion in the Torah of Moses unless he believes that all our matters and circumstances are miracles and they do not follow nature or the general custom of the world ... rather, if one does mitzvot he will succeed due to the reward he merits...

All events (natural or providential) are the result of the direct will of God, and, as such, the seemingly natural order of the world is an illusion. At the same time, any (obvious) breach in the chain of causality involves a "compromise" in the default cause and effect nature of the universe—providence is thus exercised sparingly, and in as "seemingly natural" a manner as possible. Thus, whereas the fate of the Jews as a nation is guided by providence, individuals do not enjoy the same providential relationship with the Almighty. Only the righteous and the wicked can expect providential treatment, while the fate of more “average” individuals is primarily guided by natural law.

David Berger has argued that Nachmanides did subscribe to the existence of a natural order.

=== R. David Nieto ===
David Nieto (1654–1728) sought to reconcile classical Jewish philosophy with modern philosophical ideas. He argued that the classical concept of Divine Providence was replaced by the modern concept of Nature (טבע) that appeared in the Middle Ages. In his treatise On Divine Providence or Universal Nature or Naturing Nature, he distinguished countless Providences (hashgachot), or Natures, with different degrees:

- General providences (הַשְׁגָּחוֹת כְּלָלִיּוֹת), equivalent to the unchanging general natures, comprise the formal causes of species and natural laws that govern the behavior of objects and phenomena in the world
- Particular providences (הַשְׁגָּחוֹת פְּרָטִיּוֹת) comprise the efficient causes of particular natures in creatures, such as free will in humans
- Miraculous providences (הַשְׁגָּחוֹת נִסְתָּרִיּוֹת) comprise the final causes as seen in exceptional singularities or miracles.

Although he maintained the idea of an unchanging nature of general providence, as natural laws, he argued against the concept of determinism regarding the particular providence of free will.

== Contemporary Orthodox thought ==
Both of the above approaches continue to influence contemporary Orthodox Judaism. In general, Nachmanides' view is influential in Haredi Judaism, while Maimonides' view—in addition to Nachmanides'—underpins much of Modern Orthodox thought. Note that the Hassidic approach departs somewhat from these; see detail below.

The difference between the approaches of Nachmanides and Rambam manifests particularly in the importance assigned to, and attitudes toward, three areas:

- Derech Eretz (דרך ארץ): involvement with the natural world, particularly for purposes of livelihood.
- Technology: the use and manipulation of nature.
- Maddaʿ (מדע): knowledge of the functioning of nature and society, both to facilitate derech eretz and as a complement to Torah study.

=== Haredi Judaism ===
A notable approach in the Haredi community is that of Rabbi Eliyahu Eliezer Dessler, "whose impact on the yeshiva world in recent years has been enormous". To generalise, Rabbi Dessler teaches that given the illusory "nature of nature", each individual must find their appropriate balance between hishtadlut (personal effort) and trust (bitochon / bitachon ביטחון). Rabbi Dessler, relatedly, often repeated the idea that every object and circumstance in the material world should be viewed as a means of serving Hashem (God).

- Rabbi Dessler defines nature as the arena of "Nisayon" (נסיון Hebrew: [spiritual] test)—i.e. one must engage in worldly toil in inverse proportion to his recognition of God's providential role. Rabbi Dessler thus advises that one make his Torah "fixed" (kavua קבוע) and his derech eretz "occasional" (arai עראי). Note that Rabbi Dessler stresses that "[one cannot] exploit a tendency to laziness in order to bolster his trust in Hashem ... Trust in Hashem cannot be built up this way because the goal here is not to refrain from work but to attain certainty in trust in Hashem that leads to lessening worldly endeavors." (While Rabbi Dessler argues that this idea is sourced in Nahmanides, other scholars disagree.)
- Given this conception of nature, Rav Dessler criticizes preoccupation with technological enterprises, and equates such preoccupation with idolatry. He writes that a civilization which is preoccupied with developing the external and the material, while neglecting the inner moral content, will eventually degenerate to its lowest possible depths: “Happiness in this world comes only as a result of being content with what one has in this world, and striving intensively for spirituality” and thus “the more that people try to improve this world, the more their troubles will backlash ... Instead of realizing they are drowning in materialism, they search for further ways to enhance physicality”.
- Rav Dessler writes that the acquisition of secular knowledge is likely to be at the expense of Torah knowledge or commitment. "The philosophy of Yeshiva education is directed towards one objective alone, to nurture gedolei torah (great Torah scholars) and yirei shamayim (those "fearful of Heaven") in tandem. For this reason university was prohibited to [yeshiva] students ... [educators] could not see how to nurture Gedolei Torah unless they directed all education towards Torah exclusively".

=== Modern Orthodox Judaism ===
Joseph B. Soloveitchik echoes Maimonides' teaching. He writes that "the fundamental of providence is ... transformed into a concrete commandment, an obligation incumbent upon man. Man is obliged to broaden the scope and strengthen the intensity of the individual providence that watches over him. Everything is dependent on him; it is all in his hands"

- In line with this emphasis on proactivity, Modern Orthodox thought regards derech eretz, human involvement with the natural world, as a divine imperative inherent in the nature of creation (as opposed to as a "necessary evil" as above). Here, "worldly involvement" extends to a positive contribution to society at large. This understanding is reflected both in Soloveitchik's conception as well as in the teachings of Samson Raphael Hirsch.
- Similarly, Soloveitchik, in The Lonely Man of Faith, mandates the involvement of human beings in technological activity. This is based on God's blessing to Adam and Eve "Fill the land and conquer it" (Genesis 1:28), which extends to the obligation of the imitation of God. The use and development of technology, then, is not characterised as "prideful", but rather is seen as obligatory upon man.
- Further, Madda, knowledge of the natural world and society, is regarded as vital in Modern Orthodox thought. This knowledge plays an obvious role in facilitating derech eretz and the development of technology. It is also seen as valuable as a complement to Torah study. This further reflects Maimonides, in that he, famously, defines science and philosophy as "Handmaidens" of Torah study—one could not be a learned Jew without this knowledge.

== Particular divine providence in Hasidic philosophy ==
The tradition of kabbalah, whose main works were published beginning in the Middle Ages, stood in contrast to the medieval Jewish rationalistic philosophy articulated in the same period by figures like Maimonides. Nachmanides was an early exponents of kabbalah, though his Bible commentary avoids using the direct terminology of kabbalah. As the tradition of kabbalah developed it evolved through the successive stages of medieval kabbalah, exemplified in the Zohar, the 16th-century rational synthesis of Cordoveran Kabbalah, the subsequent new paradigm of cosmic rectification in Lurianic Kabbalah and the 18th-century popularisation of Jewish mysticism in Hasidism.

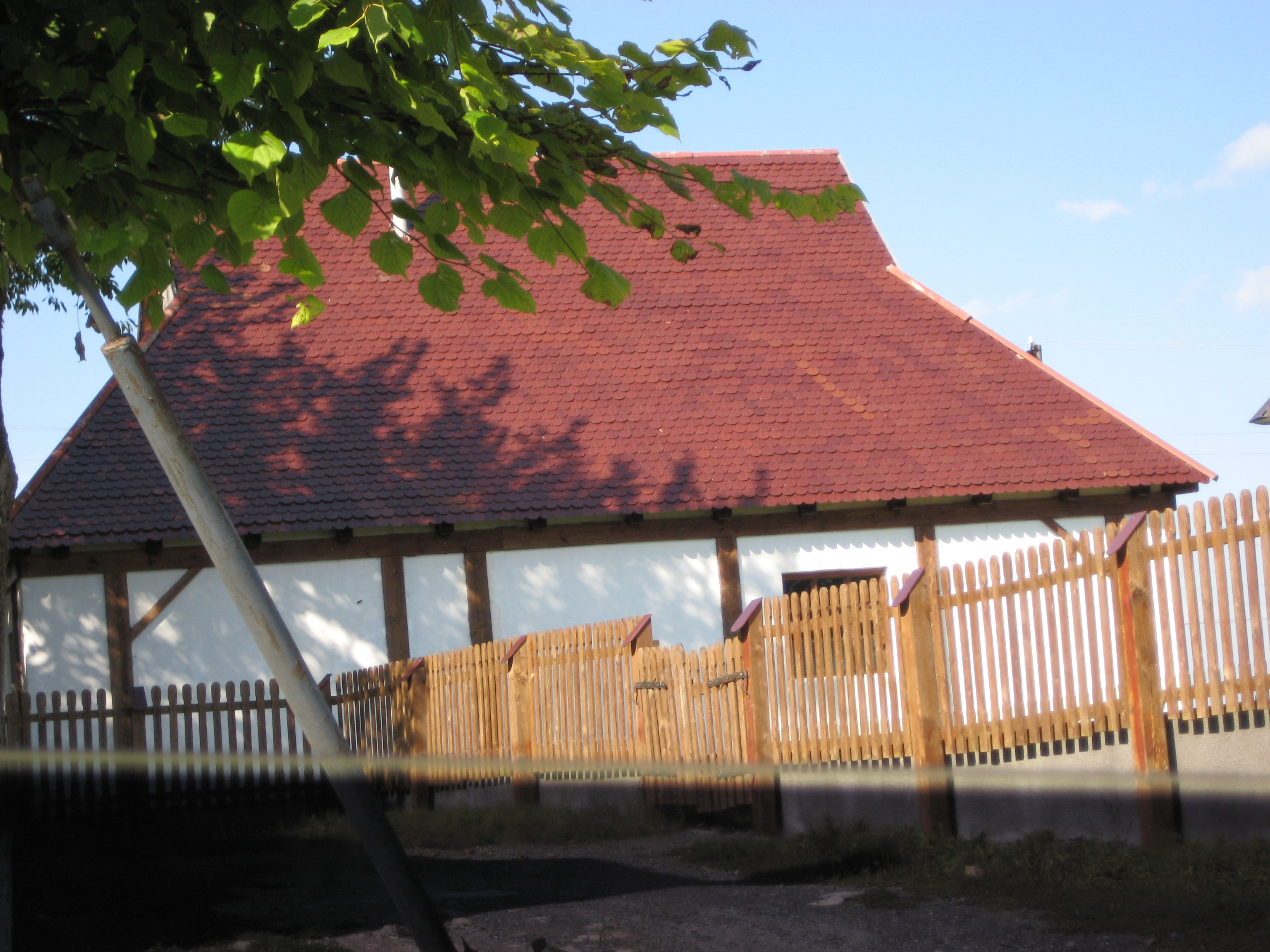
The rebuilt synagogue of the Baal Shem Tov in Medzhybizh

The teachings of Hasidic philosophy sought to relate the esoteric structures of kabbalah to the daily spiritual life of man. It sought to awaken a personal, psychological perception of godliness in dveikut (mystical joy and cleaving to God). Hasidic teachings taught new dimensions of divine unity, omnipresence and individual divine providence. According to Yisrael Baal Shem Tov, the founder of Hasidism, divine providence governs every detail of Creation. He taught that "the movement of a leaf in the wind" is a part of the Divine purpose of Creation.

Rebbe Nachman of Breslov taught that God is good to everyone, thereby alluding to divine providence; the fulfillment of human needs such as rains for agriculture depends on the will of God as a response to the behavior of human beings. (Note: "For the will of [God] is in all things: He is found in creation in general, that is, [God] wanted to create the world in general; and it is in the specific things of creation. In each of the particular things is [God's] will - that is, [God] wanted that specific thing to be as it is, with its specific form, with its strength and with its nature; ... Now, the Tzaddik always aspires and seeks those wills, to understand and understand the will of the Holy One, blessed be He, in each thing, such as: Why did the Holy One, blessed be He, wanted the lion with a specific force and power, ... The same applies to all created things in the world: the mineral, the vegetable, the animal, and the human. The differences between them are innumerable. Similarly, in the case "in particular", i.e. the differences in the details, between one member and another, are numerous. The same is also true of herbs, trees and other particular entities of creation. There are many differences in all its forms, its strength and its behavior. All this is due to the will of the Creator, that His name be blessed, because He wanted one thing to be the way it is and another thing to be the way it is. ... In each of the movements of an individual Jew, there is a different [quality in which God takes] pride. ... And the Tzaddik ... finds the value that exists in the Jewish people collectively, individually and in every detail of their lives ... as a result he understands and understands all the wills that the Holy One, blessed be he, has in all creation in general, in particular and in the details of the particular. This is because all the wills of all creation were for the sake of [God's] pride in Israel." -Rebbe Nachman of Breslov, Likutey Moharan III-17)

According to Lurianic kabbalah, every animate and inanimate object has a spiritual form of "soul" within its physical form, which is its continual creating source in the Divine Light. Even a stone has this level of a "soul", though it is unlike the living soul of a plant, the conscious soul of an animal, or the intelligent soul of man. It is rather its animating existence in the Divine Will, as in Jewish mysticism, creation is continuous and would revert to nothingness without the constant divine animation within it. Accordingly, in the words of Luria, "every leaf contains a soul that came into the world to receive a Rectification".

=== Divine unity in Hasidism ===
This mystical interpretation of particular Divine Providence is part of the wider Hasidic interpretation of God's Unity. The second section of the Hasidic text the Tanya by Schneur Zalman of Liadi (Shaar Hayichud Vehaemunah-Gate of Unity and Faith), brings the mystical panentheism of the Baal Shem Tov into philosophical explanation. It explains the Hasidic interpretation of God's Unity in the first two lines of the Shema, based on their kabbalistic interpretation. The emphasis on divine omnipresence and immanence lies behind Hasidic joy and devekut, and its stress on transforming the material into spiritual worship. In this internalization of kabbalistic ideas, the Hasidic follower seeks to reveal the unity of hidden divinity in all activities of life. Nachman of Breslov teaches that a big part of choices needs faith, or, in other words, good relations are supported by faith.

Medieval rationalist philosophers such as Maimonides, describe monotheism as the belief that there is only one God, and that his essence is a unique, simple, infinite unity. Jewish mysticism gives a further explanation, by distinguishing between God's essence and emanation. In kabbalah, and especially in Hasidism, God's unity means that nothing is independent of his essence. The new doctrine in Lurianic Kabbalah of God's tzimtzum "withdrawal", received different interpretations after Isaac Luria, from the literal to the metaphorical. To Hasidism and Schneur Zalman, it is unthinkable for the withdrawal of God that "makes possible" creation to be taken literally. Tzimtzum only relates to the Ohr Ein Sof ("infinite light"), not the Ein Sof (divine essence) itself, and involved only apparent concealment, not actual concealment. God's unbounded essence is revealed in both complementary infinitude (infinite light) and finitude (finite light). The withdrawal was only an illusion, concealing the infinite light in the essence of God, allowing the latent, potentially finite light to emerge apparent to creation after the tzimtzum. God himself remains unaffected ("For I, the Lord, I have not changed" Malachi 3:6). His essence was one, alone, before creation, and still one, alone, after creation, without any change. As the tzimtzum was only the illusion of concealment, God's unity is omnipresent. In the Baal Shem Tov's new interpretation, divine providence affects every detail of creation, as everything is part of the unfolding divine unity and is a necessary part of the kabbalistic messianic rectification. This awareness of the loving purpose and significance of each individual awakens devekut.

==== Lower unity ====
Schneur Zalman explains that God's unity has two levels, which are both paradoxically true. The main text of Kabbalah, the Zohar, describes the first verse of the shema as the "Upper level Unity", and the second line ("Blessed be the Name of the Glory of His Kingdom forever") as the "Lower level Unity". Schneur Zalman gives the Hasidic explanation of this. In kabbalah, all creation is dependent on the immanent, potentially finite, "Light that Fills all Worlds", that each creation receives continually. Creation is a continuous process, as without the downward flow of spiritual light from God's will, creation would revert to nothingness. Lurianic Kabbalah extends the divine unity in this, by describing the particular nitzot (divine spark) enclothed within, that gives life to each entity. The Baal Shem Tov's Hasidic panentheism describes the further, complete unity of God with creation. In his interpretation, quoted by Schneur Zalman, the creative words of God of Genesis, through innumerable permutations of their Hebrew letters, themselves become each spiritual and physical entity of creation. This extends Luria's divine immanence to complete unity. Isaac Luria's doctrine of the tzimtzum (withdrawal of God), that made a "vacuum" within which finite creation could take place, is therefore not literal. It is only a concealment of God's creating light, and only from the perspective of creation. God remains in the vacuum exactly as before creation. In reality all creation is completely bittul-nullified to God's light, even though in our realm this utter dependence is presently concealed. From this perspective, of God knowing the creation on its own terms, creation exists, but the essence of anything is only the divine light that continuously recreates it from nothing. God is one, as creation takes place within God. "There is nothing outside of Him." This is the "Lower Level Unity".

==== Higher unity ====
In relation to God's essence, creation affects no change or withdrawal in the divine. "There is nothing but God". The ability to create can only come from the divine atzmut(essence), whose power of infinitude is described by the Tetragrammaton (name of God). However, "It is not the essence of the Divine to create Worlds and sustain them", as this ability is only external to the infinite essence. Creation only derives from God's revelatory "speech" (as in Genesis 1), and even this is unlike the external speech of Man, as it too remains "within" God. From the upper perspective of God knowing himself on his own terms, creation does not exist, as it is as nothing in relation to God's essence. This monistic acosmism is the "Upper Level Unity", as from this perspective, only God exists. The illusionism of this is not absolute, as the paradox means that both contradictory upper and lower levels of unity are true.

=== Integration of providence in Hasidism with Maimonides ===
The school of Chabad sought to articulate Hasidic philosophy in intellectual systemisation. This was exemplified by the aim of the 5th Rebbe, Sholom Dovber Schneersohn, that his yeshiva academies should study Hasidic thought with the logical method of pilpul, traditionally used in Talmudic study. In the Hasidic teachings of Habad, this approach was used by each Rebbe in their public discourses and talks, with each successive leader aiming to bring down the philosophy of Hasidism into greater grasp and articulation. The 7th leader, Menachem Mendel Schneerson, typically addressed Hasidic philosophy most often in informal, analytical talks. This approach to Hasidic mysticism enabled it to study the integration of other aspects of Jewish thought into the Hasidic explanations. In Hasidic terminology, it takes a higher spiritual source in divinity to unite opposing, lower opinions. In Hasidic thought, Talmudic legislation, midrashic imagination, rationalist descriptions and kabbalistic structures are seen to reflect lower dimensions of a higher, essential Divine Unity. This method was used by the 7th Rebbe to address the topic of divine providence. In a series of talks, translated and published in English, the Lubavitcher Rebbe addresses the resolution between the Hasidic conception of divine providence, and its previous formulations in medieval Jewish philosophy and kabbalah. It sees the views of Maimonides and others as part of the new conception of the Baal Shem Tov.
