= David ben Abraham ha-Laban =

David ben Abraham ha-Laban (דוד בן אברהם הלבן) was a French religious philosopher and kabalist who lived after 1200. His grandfather, Judah, was rabbi of Coucy-le-Château.

David was the author of Masoret ha-Berit (The Bond of the Covenant), on the existence, the unity, and the attributes of God, and also on creation and its purpose (Paris MSS. Nos. 800, 871). The fact that the work exists in several manuscript copies shows that it was much read.

== Jewish Encyclopedia bibliography ==
- Isaac Benjacob, Oẓar ha-Sefarim, p. 344;
- Henri Gross, Gallia Judaica, p. 559;
- Fuenn, Keneset Yisrael, p. 239;
- Adolf Neubauer, Cat. Bodl. Hebr. MSS. Nos. 1565 (10), 1647 (4), 2240 (13)
