= Idra =

Kabbalistic work included in printings of the Zohar

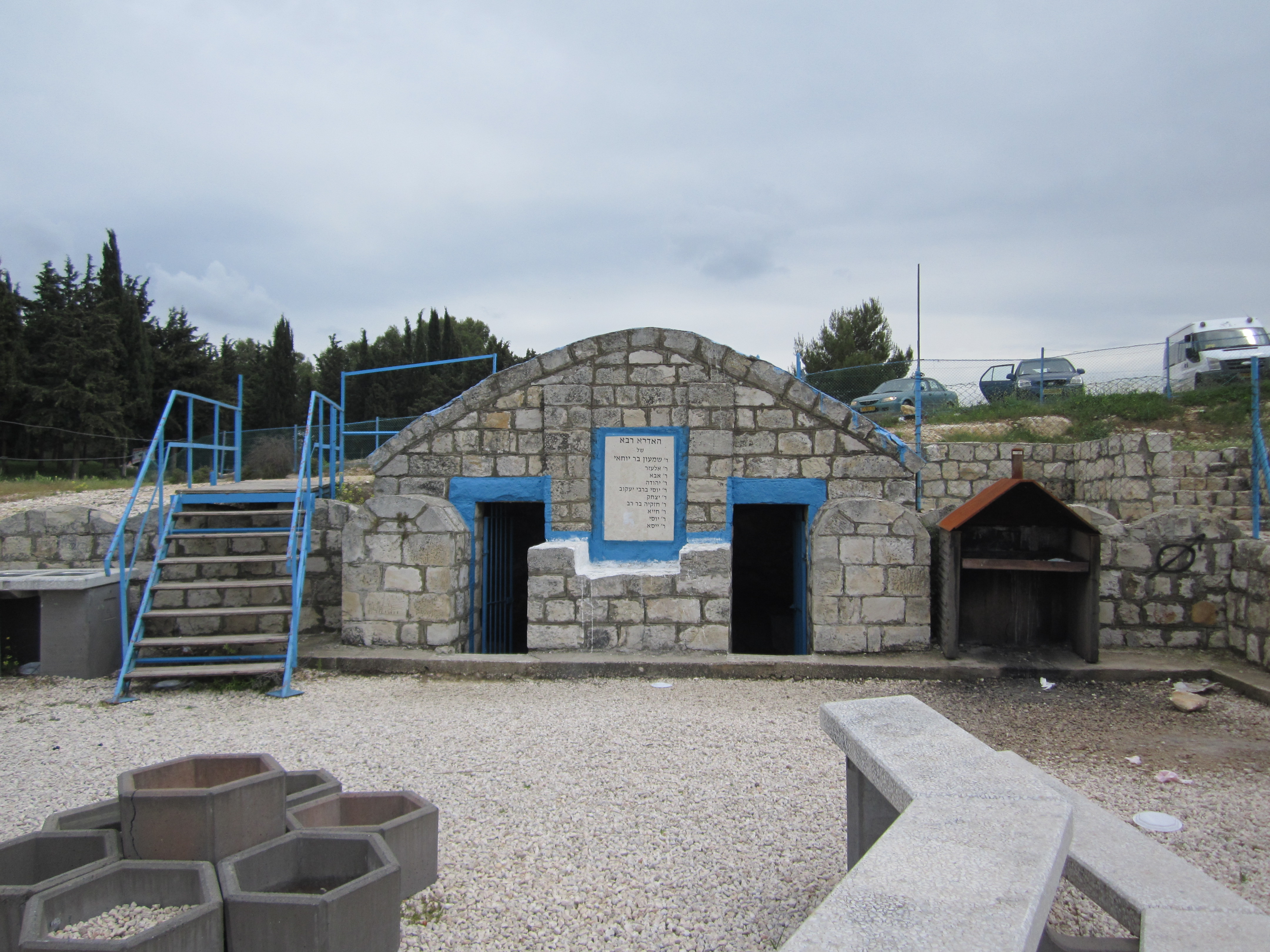
Traditional location of the Idra Rabba Assembly, near Meron

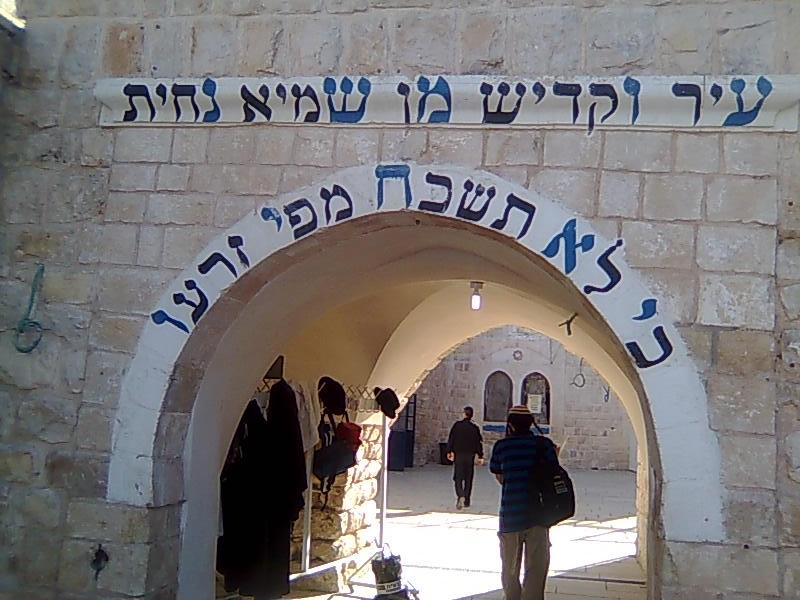
Ohel grave of Shimon bar Yochai

The Idra (Jewish Babylonian Aramaic: אִדְרָא, romanized: iḏrā, lit. 'threshing floor'), is a Kabbalistic work included in printings of the Zohar, and was probably written and appended to the main body of the Zohar at a later date. Contemporary scholars believe the Idra dates to the third generation of Zoharic literature, which also produced the two anonymous or collective works of the Tikunei haZohar and Ra'aya Mehemna "Faithful Shephard" as well as other Zoharic material. The main body of the Zohar dates to the second generation of Zoharic material.

There are two texts in Zoharic literature called the Idra. The first is the Idra Rabba "greater Idra", and the second is the Idra Zuta "lesser Idra." These two texts are intimately connected.

- Idra Rabba (אדרא רבא, Zohar 3:127b-145a): Shimon bar Yohai convenes with nine other scholars, and they gather in the sacred threshing field, where they thresh out secrets. Each scholar expounds various configurations of the partsufim (emanations of the Godhead), and three of them die in ecstasy while doing so. In one discussion, the subject of the woman with the furnishings gifted to her by the Creator, and of the man with the furnishings gifted to him by the same Creator, is brought up. It speaks about the physical union of male and female and how the two are analogous to YHWH, who created Adam (humanity, both male and female) with their associated traits of "mercy" (raḥamim), a trait that is found with the male, and "judgment" (din), a trait that is found with the female.
- Idra Zuta (אדרא זוטא, Zohar 3:287b-296d): Years later, at Shimon bar Yohai's deathbed, the seven still-living scholars come to his deathbed, along with the whole heavenly host. He alone explains the configurations of the partsufim, so this work is more unified. Shimon bar Yohai wavers between this world and the next. He directed his students to celebrate his death that day as a Yom Hillula (wedding), as it would messianically unite the immanent and transcendent ohr "divine lights" of Creation. The Idra Zuta is considered the deepest teachings of the Zohar.

In the standard printed edition of the Zohar, the Idra Rabba is printed in the section relating to the parasha of Naso, and the Idra Zuta is printed in Haazinu.

== Lurianic systemisation of the partzufim ==
16th century Lurianic Kabbalah systemised the Zoharic partzufim in its recasting of the whole Kabbalistic scheme. On one occasion, as recorded by Hayyim ben Joseph Vital, Isaac Luria convened his students in the traditional location of the Idra Rabba Assembly near Meron, placing each one in the designated location of their former incarnations as the students of bar Yohai. In so doing, he identified himself with bar Yohai.

== See also ==
- Zohar
- Partzufim
- Yom Hillula

== Bibliography ==
- Hellner-Eshed, Melila (2021). Seekers of the Face: Secrets of the Idra Rabba. Stanford University Press. ISBN 9781503628427.
- William Oscar Emil Oesterley, George Herbert Box (1920). A Short Survey of the Literature of Rabbinical and Mediæval Judaism. Macmillan. p. 248. "Idra Rabba."
- Vital, Hayyim; Isaac Luria (2003) [Late 1500s/Early 1600s]. Shaar ha-Gilgulim [Gates of Reincarnation]. Thirty Seven Books Publishing. p. 534. ISBN 0-9727924-0-6. Archived from the original on 2013-12-12.
- Fine, Lawrence (2003). Rodrigue, Aron; Zipperstein, Steven J (eds.). Physician of the Soul, Healer of the Cosmos: Isaac Luria and His Kabbalistic Fellowship. Stanford, CA: Stanford University Press. p. 480. ISBN 0-8047-4826-8.
