= Ein Sof =

Infinite, unknowable aspect of God

Ein Sof, or Eyn Sof (/eɪn sɒf/, Hebrew: אֵין סוֹף ʾēn sōf; meaning "infinite", lit. '(There is) no end'), in Kabbalah, is understood as God before any self-manifestation in the production of any spiritual realm, probably derived from Solomon ibn Gabirol's (c. 1021 – c. 1070) term, "the Endless One" (שֶׁאֵין לוֹ תִּקְלָה, šeʾēn lo tiqlā). Ein Sof may be translated as "unending", "(there is) no end", or infinity. It was first used by Azriel of Gerona (c. 1160 – c. 1238), who shared the Neoplatonic belief that God can have no desire, thought, word, or action, emphasized by the negation of any attribute.

This is the origin of the Ohr Ein Sof or "Infinite Light" of paradoxical divine self-knowledge, nullified within the Ein Sof before creation. In Lurianic Kabbalah, the first act of creation, the tzimtzum or self-withdrawal of the divine to create a space, takes place from there.

In Hasidic Judaism, the Tzimtzum is only the illusionary concealment of the Ohr Ein Sof, giving rise to monistic panentheism. Consequently, Hasidism focuses on the Atzmut "divine essence" rooted higher within the Godhead than the Ein Sof, which is limited to infinitude and reflected in the essence (etzem) of the Torah and the soul.

== Explanation ==
The Zohar explains the term "Ein Sof" as follows:

Before He gave any shape to the world, before He produced any form, He was alone, without form and without resemblance to anything else. Who then can comprehend how He was before the Creation? Hence it is forbidden to lend Him any form or similitude, or even to call Him by His sacred name, or to indicate Him by a single letter or a single point... But after He created the form of the Heavenly Man, He used him as a chariot wherein to descend, and He wishes to be called after His form, which is the sacred name "YHWH".

In other words, "Ein Sof" signifies "the nameless being". In another passage the Zohar reduces the term to "Ayin" (non-existent), because God so transcends human understanding as to be practically non-existent.

In addition to the Sefer Yetzirah and the Zohar, other well-known explications of the relation between Ein Sof and all other realities and levels of reality have been formulated by the Jewish mystical thinkers of the Middle Ages, such as Isaac the Blind and Azriel. Judah Ḥayyaṭ, in his commentary Minḥat Yehudah on the Ma'areket Elahut, gives the following explanation of the term "Ein Sof":

Any name of God which is found in the Bible can not be applied to the Deity prior to His self-manifestation in the Creation, because the letters of those names were produced only after the emanation. ... Moreover, a name implies a limitation in its bearer; and this is impossible in connection with the "Ein Sof".

== The Ten Sefirot ==
According to Gershom Scholem, the Ein Sof is the emanator of the ten sefirot. Sefirot are energy emanations found on the Kabbalistic Tree of Life. Ein Sof, the Atik Yomin ("Ancient of Days"), emanates the sefirot into the cosmic womb of the Ayin in a manner that results in the created universe. The three letters composing the word "Ayin" (אי״ן), indicate the first three purely intellectual sefirot, which precede any emotion or action. The order of devolution can be described as:

- 000. Ayin (Nothing; אין)
- 00. Ein Sof (Limitlessness; אין סוף)
- 0. Ohr Ein Sof (Endless Light; אור אין סוף)
- -.Tzimtzum (Contraction; צמצום)
- 1. Keter (Crown; כתר)
- 2. Chokmah (Wisdom; חכמה)
- 3. Binah (Understanding; בינה)
- 4. Chesed or Gedulah (Loving Kindness or Mercy; חסד)
- 5. Gevurah or Din (Power or Judgement; גבורה)
- 6. Tiferet (Beauty or Compassion; תפארת)
- 7. Netzach (Triumph or Endurance; נצח)
- 8. Hod (Majesty or Splendor; הוד)
- 9. Yesod (Foundation; יסוד)
- 10. Malkuth (Realm; מלכות)

The ten sefirot were preceded by a stage of concealment called tzimtzum, which "allows space" for creations to perceive themselves as separate existences from their creator. The sefirot exhibit reflection in sets of triads between more exalted states of being (or "non-being," when "otherness" does not yet exist) and the lower, more mundane levels of existence:

- Ayin, Ein Sof, Ohr Ein Sof
- Keter, Chokmah, Binah
- Chesed, Gevurah, Tiferet
- Netzach, Hod, Yesod

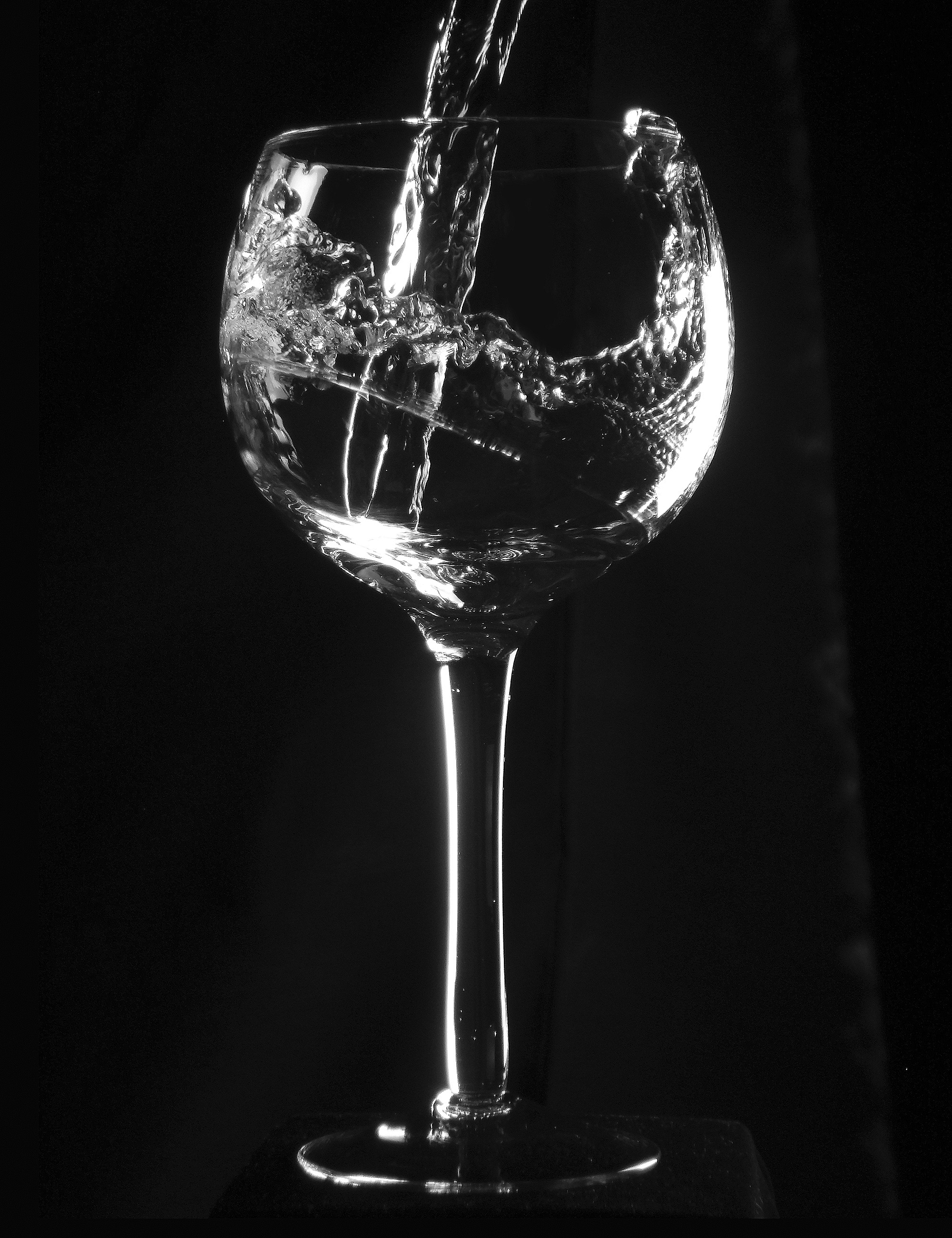
The sefirot consist of lights invested in vessels, similar to water poured into a glass. While taking on the shape of the glass, the water is essentially unchanged.

Concerned that misinterpretation could lead to the idolatrous belief of duality or multiplicity in God, the Kabbalists frequently stress that the sefirot are bound up in the Ein Sof, and that without the Ein Sof the sefirot have no existence. However, there is an apparent contradiction, since in Kabbalah, the sefirot are sometimes called divine in themselves, despite the assertion that they are only vehicles to manifest God. Moses ben Jacob Cordovero, who gave the first full systemization of Kabbalah in the 16th century, resolved the contradiction, explaining that the sefirot consist of lights invested in vessels. In detail, whereas the vessels are differentiated vehicles for creation, the light is the undifferentiated light of the Ein Sof. This is similar to how water poured into differently-shaped vessels will take on the vessels' forms, or how light streaming through different colors of glass appears in different colors. Despite the change in appearance, the water and the light emanate from a single source and are essentially unchanged; the vessels merely serve to filter and veil the light to reveal different aspects of the creator, and to permit creations to benefit from his light. This explanation was accepted and expanded upon in later works of Kabbalah and Hasidic philosophy.

== Atzmus ==
Hasidic Judaism in the 18th century internalised the esoteric, transcendent emanations of Kabbalah into immanent, psychological perception and correspondence. The term in Hasidic philosophy for the divine source is Atzmus ("essence"). While the Ein Sof of Kabbalah can only be infinite, Atzmus, rooted higher in the Godhead, is beyond finite/infinite duality. As the Etzem, it both transcends all levels, and permeates all levels. This is reflected in the paradoxical acosmic monism of Hasidic panentheism, and relates to the essence of the Torah and the soul. In Hasidic thought, Kabbalah corresponds to the World of Atzilus, the sephirah of Chokmah and the transcendent soul level of Chayyah; Hasidic philosophy corresponds to the World of Adam Kadmon, the sephirah of Keter and the soul essence of Yechidah. The Baal Shem Tov taught that the only reflection of Atzmus is the sincerity of the soul in performing the Jewish observances and prayer. Consequently, Hasidism gave new emphasis to the common folk, and to prayer and action over traditionally pre-eminent Torah study, as Atzmus is most reflected in the lowest levels, the purpose of creation in making a "dwelling place" for God in the lowest realms. In response, Chaim Volozhin, the main theological theorist of the Misnagdim, opposed Hasidic panentheism and re-emphasised Talmudic study.

== Other views ==
The Sabbatean movement believed in a heterodox doctrine of Lurianic Kabbalah as taught by Nathan of Gaza, in which the Ein Sof itself was the origin of evil and the world of the qlippoth. According to this belief, the tzimtzum and subsequent re-radiation only took place for the creative aspects of the godhead, known as the "thoughtful light" (or she-yesh bo mahshavah). The greater divine aspects that had no desire for creation, the "thoughtless light" (or she-ein bo mahshavah), remained within the vacuum (tehiru) and became a material substrate for the thoughtful light’s creation. However, the ray of creative light could only penetrate to the upper half of the tehiru, while the lower half, known as the "Great Abyss", remained dominated by the unformed thoughtless light, which retaliate by creating the world of the qlippoth to destroy the thoughtful light’s creation. Sabbateans believed that the Messiah, Sabbatai Zevi, was a trapped or demonic soul whose escape from the Abyss would result in the purification of the qlippoth and the Abyss itself being penetrated and formed by the creative light, thus reconciling the polarities of God.

== In modern Hebrew ==
In modern Hebrew as spoken in contemporary Israel, "ein sof" (often contracted to "einsof" – אינסוף) is commonly used as simply the word for "infinity", without reference to God and to the above intricate Kabbalistic connotations.

== See also ==
- Ananta
- al-Bāqī
- Apeiron
- Ayin and Yesh
- Divine simplicity
- Essence-energies distinction
- God in Judaism
- Hayyi Rabbi
- Monad
- Panentheism
- Wuji (philosophy)

== Bibliography ==
- Ehrenpreis (1895). Die Entwickelung der Emanationslehre in der Kabbala des XIII. Jahrhunderts. Frankfort-on-the-Main. p. 26.
- Franck (1889). La Kabbale. Paris. p. 136.
- Ginsburg, Christian David (1865). The Ḳabbalah. London. p. 105.
- Joël (1849). Die Religionsphilosophie des Sohar. Leipsic.
- Karppe (1901). Etude sur les Origines et la Nature du Zohar. Paris. p. 344.
- Myer (1888). Qabbalah. Philadelphia. pp. 251 et seq.
- Scholem, Gershom (1974). Kabbalah. Jewish Publication Society.
