= Tzimtzum =

Lurianic Kabbalah doctrine

Tzimtzum or tsimtsum (Hebrew: צִמְצוּם, romanized: ṣimṣum, lit. 'contraction, constriction, condensation') is a term used in Lurianic Kabbalah to explain Isaac Luria's doctrine that God began the process of creation by limiting the Ohr Ein Sof (infinite light) of the Godhead in order to allow for a conceptual space in which the Four Worlds, or finite realms, could exist. This primordial initial contraction, forming a "vacant space" (חלל הפנוי, ḥalal hapanuy) into which new creative light could beam, is denoted by general reference to the tzimtzum. In Kabbalistic interpretation, tzimtzum gives rise to the paradox of simultaneous divine presence and absence within the vacuum and resultant Creation. Various approaches exist as to how the paradox may be resolved, and as to the nature of tzimtzum itself.

== Function ==
The Hebrew word zimzum can mean "contraction," "retraction," "demarcation," "restraint," and "concentration." The term zimzum originates in the Kabbalah and refers to God’s contraction of himself before the creation of the world, and for the purpose of creating the world. To put it another way, the omnipresent God, who exists beyond time and space before creation, withdraws a part of his infinite presence into himself. With this divine gesture, God restricts himself in zimzum, clearing the empty space that is necessary for creation. The emanation and the creation of the world are then able to occur in the center of God following this act of zimzum. In this process, God limits his omnipotence, so that a finite world can exist within finite contours. Without zimzum, there would be no creation. For this reason, zimzum is a key concept in Jewish thought.

Because the tzimtzum results in the space in which the spiritual and physical worlds and, ultimately, free will, can exist, God is often referred to as "Ha-Makom" (המקום lit. "the Place", "the Omnipresent") in rabbinic literature. Olam, the Hebrew term for a world, is derived from the triliteral עלם "concealment". This etymology is complementary with the concept of tsimtsum in that the subsequent spiritual realms and the ultimate physical universe conceal to different degrees the lifeforce of creation.

Their progressive diminutions of the divine ohr (Light) from realm to realm in creation are also referred to in the plural as secondary tzimtzumim. However, these subsequent concealments are found in medieval Kabbalah. The new doctrine of Luria advanced the notion of the primordial withdrawal or dilug (radical "leap") to reconcile the causal creative chain from the Godhead with finite existence.

=== Inherent paradox ===
A commonly held understanding in Kabbalah is that the concept of tzimtzum contains a built-in paradox, requiring that God be simultaneously transcendent and immanent. Viz.: On the one hand, if the "Infinite" did not restrict itself, then nothing could exist—everything would be overwhelmed by God's totality. Existence thus requires God's transcendence, as above. On the other hand, God continuously maintains the existence of, and is thus not absent from, the created universe.

The Divine life-force which brings all creatures into existence must constantly be present within them ... were this life-force to forsake any created being for even one brief moment, it would revert to a state of utter nothingness, as before the creation.

God gives their force to all creatures and this force gives them their limits, so that material substance could be finite and with nature for Original providence.

Nachman of Breslav discusses this inherent paradox as follows:

Only in the future will it be possible to understand the Tzimtzum that brought the "Empty Space" into being, for we have to say of it two contradictory things ... [1] the Empty Space came about through the Tzimtzum, where, as it were, He 'limited' His Godliness and contracted it from there, and it is as though in that place there is no Godliness ... [2] the absolute truth is that Godliness must nevertheless be present there, for certainly nothing can exist without His giving it life.

— Likkutei Moharan I, 64:1

So God is eternal and the infinity in time and space is his nature: we cannot think the infinity of causes about the infinity of Universe or Creation because in the first case the infinity of numbers is only possible in theory but God is the Creator and no one can be like God, "the First Cause": it is impossible thinking about two God because one of them could have hypothetical superiority and we would admit one God, so the First Cause is God; in the second case, that is the infinity of Creation, it is impossible because, a part the "fantasy of this think without Logical-reason and without research of real study", we cannot think about infinity of time because eternity is a nature of God and not a quality of material substance:

Indeed one commentator strove to prove this proposition by putting the point in the following words: "Anything that will not be realized essentially unless it is preceded by something infinite, will not be realized and cannot come to exist." If the precedence were temporal, there might be grounds for this argument—but even so, it is open to dispute. For we see that it does in fact happen that a thing that is not realized unless being preceded by something infinite is realized. One might say, by way of analogy, that this day that we are in is realized, even though it could not have been realized unless it were preceded, according to those who subscribe to the anterior eternity of the universe, by something infinite. Although in this case the realization was accidental, nevertheless, our conceding the possibility in the case of the accidental while maintaining its impossibility in the case of the essential requires justification. But even if we concede this distinction in the matter of priority in time, there are no grounds for it in the matter of causal priority, in the case in which they are contemporaneous. For since this [viz. the possibility of realization] holds for things that are contemporaneous, by what necessity is it impossible for each one to be the cause of another, while it is possible for them all to be effects [of a single cause], once we recognize the possibility that they can be infinite simultaneously?

— Hasdai Crescas

Hasdai Crescas in "Or Hashem" explains that over the limits of world of finitude of shape it can be said that God is living forever with eternal attribute of Infinite, i.e. His essence over time and space:

If an infinite body existed, it would move either circularly or rectilinearly. If circularly, it would have to have a center, because what is circular is that which circles around a center. But if it has a center, it also has extremities. But an infinite thing has no extremities. Hence it cannot move circularly. The remaining possibility is that it moves rectilinearly, but if so, it requires necessarily two places, each of them infinite. One would be for natural motion and it would be a that-to-which, and the second would be for forcible motion and it would be a that-from-which. But if the places are two, they will necessarily be finite, since what is infinite cannot be two in number. Yet they were assumed to be infinite. Thus it [viz. an infinite body] cannot move rectilinearly. Moreover, the place cannot be infinite since it is bounded, for it was shown with respect to it that it is an encompassing limit

— Hasdai Crescas, Or Hashem

This "material-World" is "inside God", with earth and universe: God is infinite but the World and Universe are finites, so the centre of God is not possible, because of His Infinite-essence; God is infinite with the World with nature, humankind, animals, etc. "Inside-Him".Chokhmah, Binah and Daat are like onion skins because the Pardes transcends all literal significance of Torah:

And all the heavens are one on top of the other, like onion skins one on top of the other, some below and some above

— Zohar

Before Creation and before Tzimtzum "God filled all space", that is, God alone existed because Creation had not yet been created. The Torah reflects divine wisdom, so God was with the Torah even before Creation: "I (the Torah) was there"; in other words the Midrash explains that before the Creation "God played with the Torah", his wisdom was therefore his only delight. Maimonide also explains that God is the same entity together with his wisdom, he also states that "the knower, knowledge and the known" refer to the "same thing".

Hasdai Crescas relates this idea with intellect of man but this is true only for God because His Wisdom is omniscient so when "God knows about himself... He is knowing about all things". God knows also about all things in their "Quiddity", i.e. their essence and their attributes. It’s evident that God knows Himself and the intelligibles:

For the intellecter is something other than intellection, though intellection is necessitated for the intellecter by an essential necessity. It is therefore evident that this premise is false with respect to human intellect, even if we posit it with respect to intellect in actuality. This is necessitated as well for the separate intellect, for intellection is an essential attribute and not an essence. Many philosophers have stumbled in this matter, having failed to distinguish between an essence and an essential attribute. What is surprising about these philosophers is that this matter cannot escape the following disjunction. Either intellection of various different intelligibles is one thing or it is not. If it is one thing, it would be necessary for the intelligibles to be one thing, since intellection and the intellected are one thing. Yet the intelligibles were assumed to be different from one another. It would be necessitated as well that when a man knew one intelligible he would know them all, since they are one thing. But if their intellection is not one thing, it is necessitated that the intellect be composed of various intelligibles. If they are substances, it would be composed of many substances. All of this, however, is absurd in the extreme

— ”Or Adonai”

== Lurianic interpretation ==
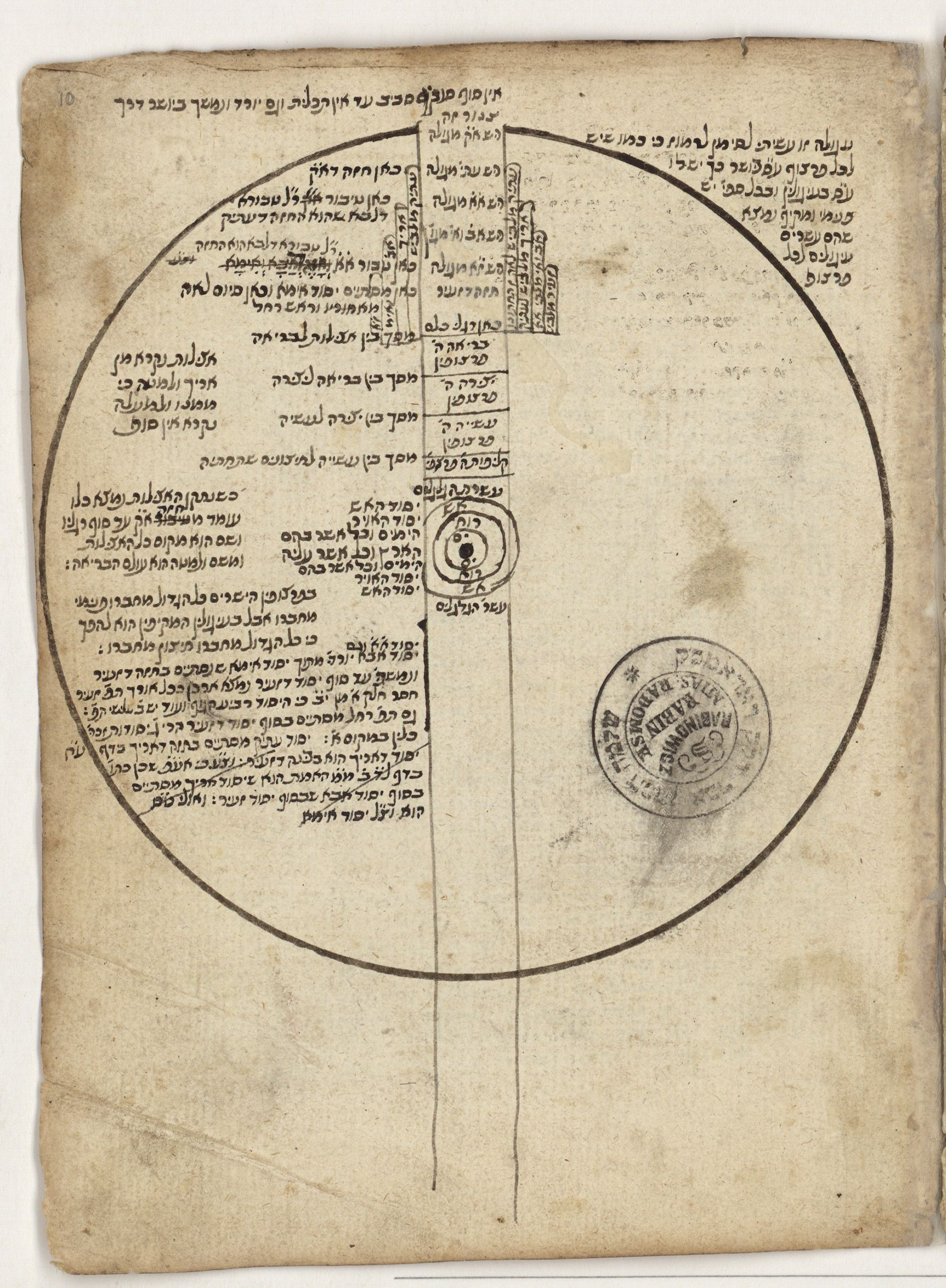
A diagram of the worlds created after the first Tzimtzum, found in a manuscript written by Menahem Lonzano, a version of a diagram found in the writings of Hayyim ben Joseph Vital

Isaac Luria introduced four central themes into Kabbalistic cosmology: tzimtzum (divine contraction), Shevirat HaKelim (the shattering of the vessels), Tikkun (repair and rectification), and Partzufim (the arrangement of divine personas). These concepts form a continuous and interrelated process describing how the finite world emerged from divine infinity. Tzimtzum represents the initial withdrawal of divine light (Ohr Ein Sof), creating a "vacant space" (chalal panui) where independent existence could emerge. However, even within this space, a residual trace of the divine (reshimu) remained, ensuring the continued presence of divinity within creation. Shevirat HaKelim describes how, after the tzimtzum, God created the vessels (HaKelim) in the empty space, and how when God began to pour his Light into the vessels they were not strong enough to hold the power of God's Light and shattered (Shevirat). The third step, Tikkun, is the process of gathering together, and raising, the sparks of God's Light that were carried down with the shards of the shattered vessels.

Since tzimtzum is connected to the concept of exile, and Tikkun is connected to the need to repair the problems of the world of human existence, Luria unites the cosmology of Kabbalah with the practice of Jewish ethics, and makes ethics and traditional Jewish religious observance the means by which God allows humans to complete and perfect the material world through living the precepts of a traditional Jewish life. Thus, in contrast to earlier, Medieval Kabbalah, this made the first creative act a concealment/divine exile rather than unfolding revelation. This dynamic crisis-catharsis in the divine flow is repeated throughout the Lurianic scheme.

== Hasidic interpretations ==
In Hasidic thought, the concept of tzimtzum is not meant to be interpreted literally but rather to refer to how God impresses his presence upon the consciousness of finite reality. Tzimtzum is not only seen as being a natural process but is also seen as a doctrine that every person is able, and indeed required, to understand and meditate upon. The function of the tzimtzum was "to conceal from created beings the activating force within them, enabling them to exist as tangible entities, instead of being utterly nullified within their source". The tzimtzum produced the required "vacated space" (חלל פנוי ḥəlāl pānuy "empty space", חלל ḥālāl "space"), devoid of direct awareness of God's presence.

== Non-Hasidic interpretations ==
=== Vilna Gaon's view ===
The Vilna Gaon maintained that tzimtzum was not a literal contraction of God's presence but rather a conceptual process that was not perceptible to those who had not been fully initiated into Kabbalistic thought. While he rejected the notion that God physically withdrew from creation, he also emphasized that the upper unity—the idea that the universe is ultimately an illusion—remained beyond human comprehension for those untrained in esoteric wisdom.

Despite this, some scholars argue that the Vilna Gaon held a more literal interpretation of tzimtzum, viewing it as a real withdrawal in a certain sense. This perspective is particularly emphasized by Rabbi Shlomo Elyashiv, who insisted that the literal reading of Luria's teachings aligns with the Gaon's view. Elyashiv criticized later interpretations that treated the world as entirely illusory, arguing that such an approach undermines the foundations of Torah and Jewish belief.

Ultimately, both the Vilna Gaon and Elyashiv maintained that tzimtzum applied only to God's will (ratzon), rather than to God's essential being (Atzmus), which remains unknowable and beyond all human comprehension.

== Modern interpretations ==
Some modern scholars have reinterpreted Tzimtzum using psychological and existential frameworks. Shlomo Giora Shoham presents tzimtzum as a mythoempirical projection of pregnancy, arguing that the process of divine contraction mirrors gestation and fetal development. In this view, tzimtzum is not merely a withdrawal but a gradual transformation, where infinite divine light is "fed" and develops within a cosmic womb. Shoham describes the fetus as a core of Divinity, which eventually leads to the materialization of cosmic vessels and the formation of finite existence.

Expanding on this idea, Shoham further elaborates that Shevirat HaKelim, the breaking of these vessels, corresponds to birth, a moment of rupture that leads to Tikkun (repair and rectification). In this analogy, the world of Tikkun, which follows the breaking, represents the postnatal stage, where divine light is restructured into Partzufim (divine personas or images), reflecting the maturation process after birth. Shoham’s interpretation positions Lurianic Kabbalah within a universal archetypal framework, aligning tzimtzum with human developmental metaphors and the existential cycle of contraction, rupture, and restoration.

== See also ==
- Acosmism
- Hylomorphism
- Monism
- Nondualism
