= Godhead in Judaism =

Aspect of the essence of God, in Judaism

Godhead refers to the aspect or substratum of God that lies behind God's actions or properties (i.e., it is the essence of God), and its nature has been the subject of long debate in every major religion.

== Terminology ==
The closest corresponding term in the classical and modern languages of Jewish scholarship is אלוהות (elohút), meaning deity (essential nature of a god) or divinity. Max Kadushin notes that "The plural 'Elohim, gods, must not be confused with 'Elohut, Godhead. The latter is used with reference to God".

== Conceptions ==
=== Neoplatonic ===
The leading Jewish Neoplatonic writer was Solomon ibn Gabirol. In his Fons Vitae, Gabirol's position is that everything that exists may be reduced to three categories: the first substance (God), matter and form (the world), with the will as intermediary. Gabirol derives matter and form from absolute being. In the Godhead he seems to differentiate essentia (being) from proprietas (attribute), designating by proprietas the will, wisdom, creative word ("voluntas, sapientia, verbum agens"). He thinks of the Godhead as being and as will or wisdom, regarding the will as identical with the divine nature. This position is implicit in the doctrine of Gabirol, who teaches that God's existence is knowable, but not His being or constitution, no attribute being predicable of God save that of existence.

Kaufmann holds that Gabirol was an opponent of the doctrine of divine attributes. While there are passages in the Fons Vitae, in the Ethics, and even in the Keter Malkut (from which Sachs deduces Gabirol's acceptance of the theory of the doctrine of divine attributes) which seem to support this assumption, a minute examination of the questions bearing on this, such as has been made by Kaufmann (in Gesch. der Attributenlehre), proves very clearly that will and wisdom are spoken of not as attributes of the divine, but with reference to an aspect of the divine, the creative aspect; so that the will is not to be looked upon as intermediary between God and substance and form. Matter or substance proceeds from the being of God, and form from God as will, matter corresponding to the first substance and form to the will; but there is no thought in the mind of Gabirol of substance and will as separate entities, or of will as an attribute of substance. Will is neither attribute nor substance, Gabirol being so pure a monotheist that he can not brook the thought of any attribute of God lest it mar the purity of monotheism. In this Gabirol follows strictly in the line of Hebrew tradition.

=== Rationalistic ===
In the philosophy of Maimonides and other Jewish-rationalistic philosophers, there is little which can be predicated about the God other than his "existence", and even this can only be asserted equivocally.

How then can a relation be represented between Him and what is other than He when there is no notion comprising in any respect both of the two, inasmuch as existence is, in our opinion, affirmed of Him, may He be exalted, and of what is other than He merely by way of absolute equivocation. There is, in truth, no relation in any respect between Him and any of His creatures.

— Maimonides, Moreh Nevuchim (Pines 1963)

=== Kabbalistic ===
In Jewish mystical thought (Kabbalah), the term "Godhead" usually refers to the concept of Ein Sof (אין סוף), the aspect of God that lies beyond the emanations (sefirot). The "knowability" of the Godhead in Kabbalistic thought is no better than what is conceived by rationalist thinkers. As Jacobs (1973) puts it: "Of God as He is in Himself—Ein Sof—nothing can be said at all, and no thought can reach there."

Ein Sof is a place to which forgetting and oblivion pertain. Why? Because concerning all the sefirot, one can search out their reality from the depth of supernal wisdom. From there it is possible to understand one thing from another. However, concerning Ein Sof, there is no aspect anywhere to search or probe; nothing can be known of it, for it is hidden and concealed in the mystery of absolute nothingness.

— David ben Judah Hehasid, Matt (1990)

There is a divergence of opinion among the kabbalists concerning the relation of the sefirot to the Ein Sof. Azriel (commentary on the Sefer Yetzirah, p. 27b) and, after him, Menahem Recanati (Ṭa'ame ha-Miẓwot, passim) considered the sefirot to be totally different from the Divine Being. The "Ma'areket" group took the sefirot to be identical in their totality with the En Sof, each sefirah representing merely a certain view of the Infinite ("Ma'areket", p. 8b). The Zohar clearly implies that they are the names of the deity, and gives for each of them a corresponding name of God and of the hosts of angels mentioned in the Bible. Luria and Cordovero, without regarding them as instruments, do not identify them with the essence of the deity. They argue that the "Absolute One" is immanent in all the sefirot and reveals himself through them, but does not dwell in them; the sefirot can never include the Infinite. Each sefirah has a well-known name, but the Holy One has no definite name (Pardes Rimmonim, pp. 21–23).

== See also ==
- Godhead (Christianity)
- God in Judaism
- Names of God in Judaism
