= Ohr =

Term in the Jewish mystical tradition

Ohr (Hebrew: אור, romanized: ʾor, lit. 'Light', plural: אורות ʾoroṯ) is a central Kabbalistic term in Jewish mysticism. The analogy to physical light describes divine emanations. Shefa "flow" (שפע šep̄aʿ) and its derivative, hashpaʾa "influence" (השפעה hašpāʿā), are sometimes alternatively used in Kabbalah and medieval Jewish philosophy to mean divine influence, while the Kabbalists favour ʾor because its numerical value equals ר״ז, a homonym for רז rāz "mystery". ʾOr is one of the two main Kabbalistic metaphors for understanding God, along with the other metaphor of the human soul-body relationship for the sefirot.

== Image gallery ==
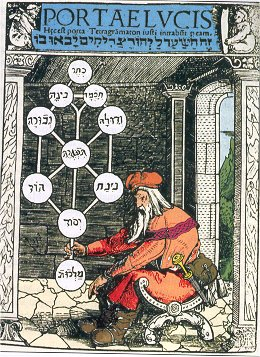
Latin translation of Shaare Orah שערי אורה "The Gates of Light", one of the most influential presentations of the Kabbalistic system, by Joseph Gikatilla in the 13th century

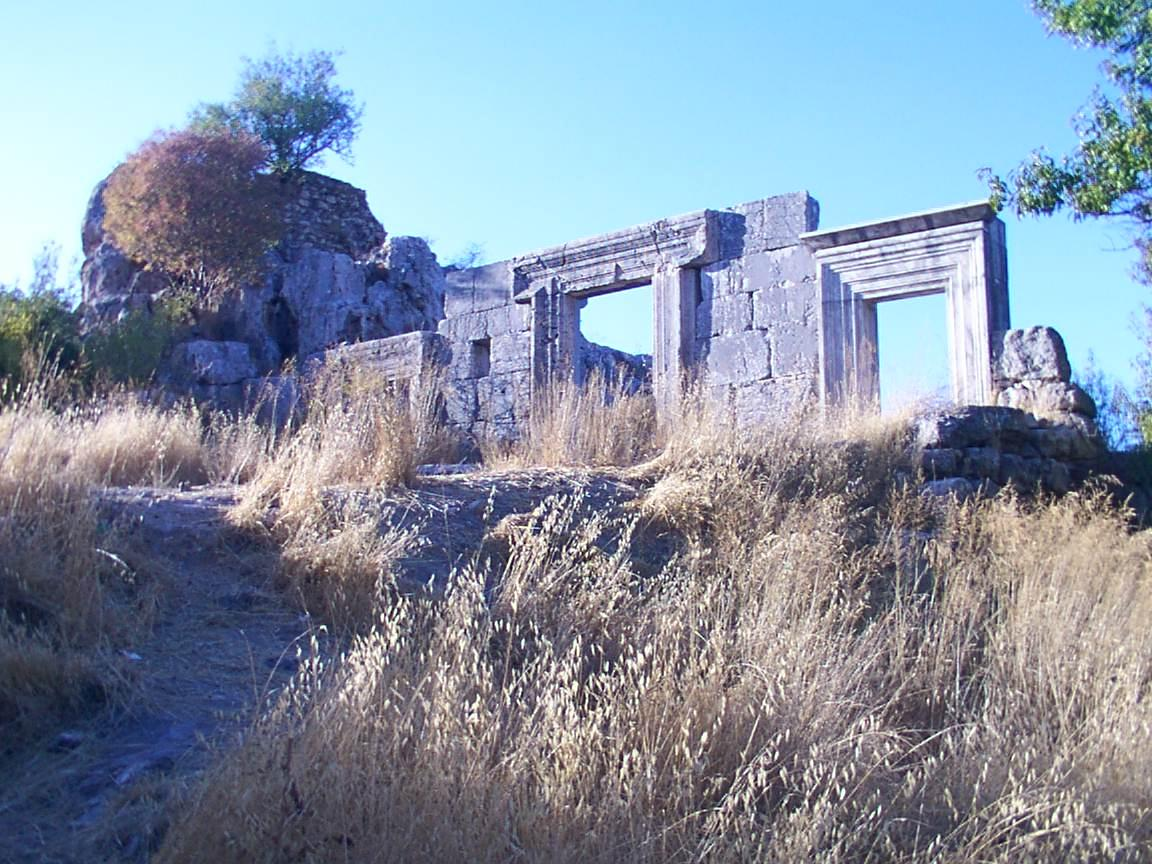
Galilean Meron. "Nature" HaTeva is the numerical value of Elohim, the name of immanent light. The Tetragrammaton transcendence creates through it. Kabbalistically, in Israel the concealment is less severe.

== See also ==
- Ayin and Yesh
- Deveikut
- Divine light
- Ein Sof
- Emanationism
- Essence–energies distinction
- Nur Muhammad
- Panentheism
- Sephirot
- Thirteen Attributes of Mercy
- Tzimtzum
- Uncreated Light
- World of Light
- Taiji (philosophy)
