= Thirteen Attributes of Mercy =

Divine Attributes with which, according to Judaism, God governs the world

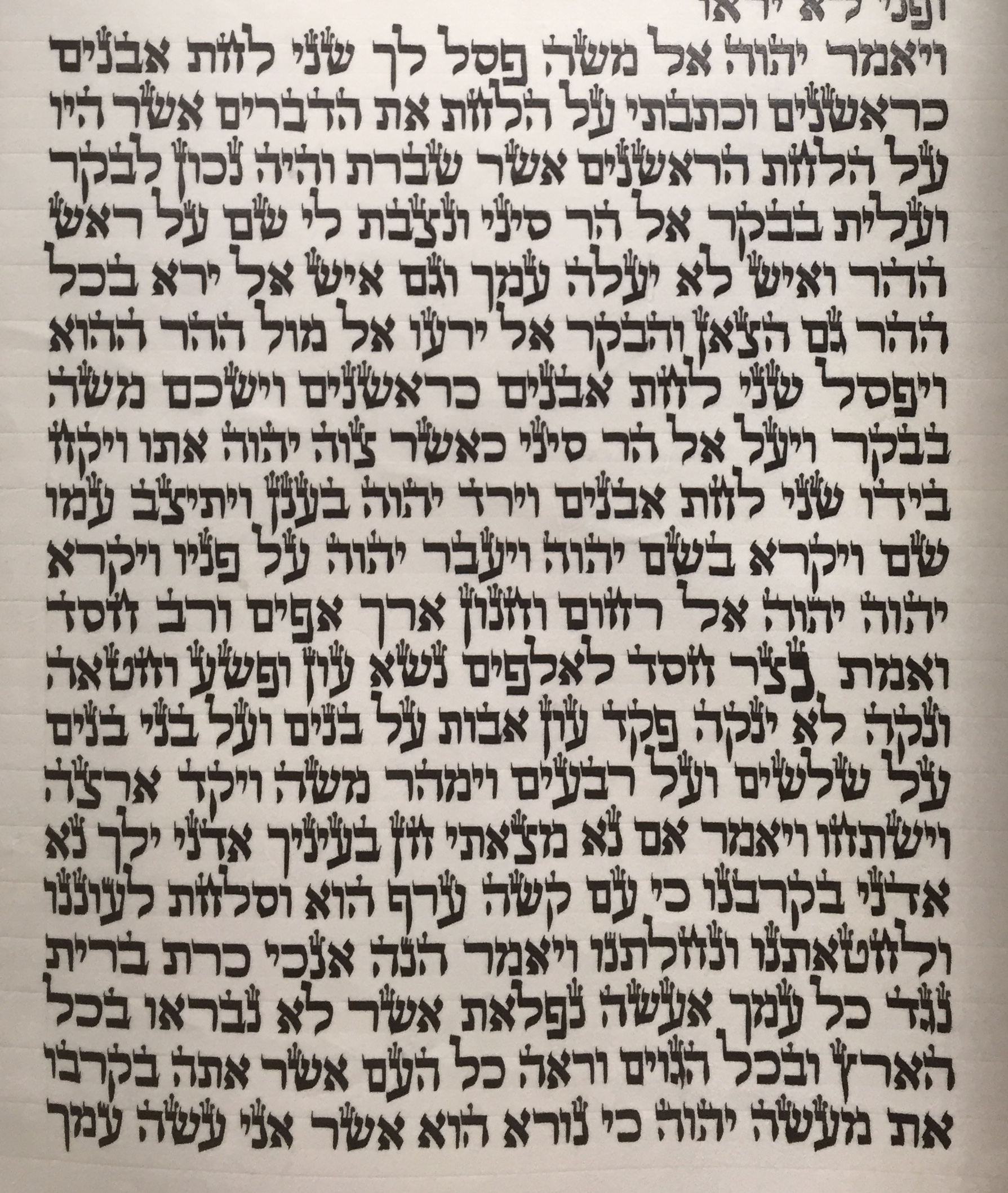
The 13 Attributes as seen in a Sefer Torah

The Thirteen Attributes of Mercy (י״ג מִידּוֹת) or Shelosh-'Esreh Middot HaRakhamim (transliterated from the Hebrew: שְׁלוֹשׁ־עֶשְׂרֵה מִדּוֹת הַרַחֲמִים) as enumerated in the Book of Exodus (Exodus 34:6–7) in Parasha Ki Tissa are the Divine Attributes with which, according to Judaism, God governs the world.

The thirteen attributes are alluded to a number of other times in the Bible. Verses where God is described using all or some of the attributes include Numbers 14:18, Joel 2:13, Jonah 4:2, Micah 7:18, Nahum 1:3, Psalms 86:15, 103:8, 145:8, and Nehemiah 9:17.

== Significance ==
The 13 attributes closely parallel the description of God's nature in the second of the Ten Commandments, except that God is characterized as merciful rather than zealous. Thus, they represent a covenant between God and Israel, replacing the covenant of the Ten Commandments which was broken by the golden calf sin. When Moses later mentioned the 13 attributes as an argument for sparing the Jewish people after the sin of the spies, he was referencing this covenant (in contrast to the covenant with the Biblical patriarchs, which Moses had referenced after the golden calf sin).

According to Maimonides the 13 attributes are not qualities inherent in God, but rather are methods of His activity, by which the divine governance appears to the human observer to be controlled. This understanding is confirmed by the Sifre, where these attributes are not called middot (which can mean "attribute"), but rather derakhim (ways), since they are the ways of God which Moses prayed to know and which God proclaimed to him.

== Division ==
The number thirteen is adopted from Talmudic and rabbinic tradition. There are divergent opinions as to the correct division of the Biblical words between attributes; Shadal describes no fewer than thirteen such opinions.

According to some, the Thirteen Attributes begin with the first "Adonai", in verse 6, and end with the word "ve-nakeh" in verse 7. The single attributes are contained in the verses as follows:

1. יְהוָה YHVH (compassion before a person sins);
2. יְהוָה YHVH (compassion after a person has sinned);
3. אֵל El (possessing the power to bestow kindness);
4. רַחוּם Raḥum: merciful (that mankind may not be distressed);
5. וְחַנּוּן VeḤanun: and gracious (if mankind is already in distress);
6. אֶרֶךְ אַפַּיִם Erekh appayim: slow to anger;
7. וְרַב-חֶסֶד VeRav ḥesed: and plenteous in lovingkindness;
8. וֶאֱמֶת VeEmet: and truth (fulfilling His promises);
9. נֹצֵר חֶסֶד לָאֲלָפִים Notzer ḥesed la'alafim: keeping kindness unto thousands (of generations). In the Torah scroll the נֹ is enlarged;
10. נֹשֵׂא עָוֹן Noseh avon: forgiving iniquity;
11. וָפֶשַׁע VaFeshah: and transgression;
12. וְחַטָּאָה VeḤata'ah: and sin;
13. וְנַקֵּה VeNakeh: and pardoning.

According to others, the Thirteen Attributes begin only with the second "Adonai", since the first one is the subject of vayikra (and He proclaimed). In this case, to achieve the total of thirteen attributes, some count notzer hesed la-alafim as two while others divide erekh appayim into two, since forbearance is shown both to the good and to the wicked, and still others end the thirteenth middah with lo yenakeh (he does not pardon), this being considered a good quality, since through punishment man is moved to repentance, after which he is pardoned and pure. Others term ve-nakeh lo yenakeh a single middah, the thirteenth being, in their opinion, poked avon avot al banim (visiting the iniquity of the fathers upon the children), "this being regarded as compassionate since the transgressor is not punished immediately".

== Liturgical usage ==
The general usage is that the various recitations of the thirteen middot begin with the first "Adonai" and conclude with "ve-nakeh".

They must not be recited by only one person in prayer, but by an entire congregation, which must consist of at least ten persons, a minyan.

- According to Lurianic Kabbalah, they are recited on holidays which do not fall on the sabbath when the Sefer Torah is taken from the Ark. In some Western Ashkenazic communities, they never accepted this custom, or accepted it only on the High Holidays and not of Pilgrimage Festivals.
- In Ashkenazi synagogues, it is also customary that on the fast days on which Exodus 32:11–14 and 34:1–10 are read, the reader stops at the word "Vayikra" in order that the congregation may recite the thirteen attributes, after which he continues his reading.
- The Thirteen Attributes are recited many times in Selichot prayers. After every petition the thirteen middot are recited with their introductory prayer, the well-known El Melech yoshev, which runs as follows: "Almighty King, sittest on the throne of mercy, showing forth Thy compassion, and forgiving the sins of Thy people by ever taking away their former guilt, ofttimes granting pardon unto sinners and forgiveness to the transgressors, making manifest Thy goodness both to body and to soul, nor punishing them according to their iniquity; Almighty One, as Thou hast taught us to recite the thirteen [middot], so remember now the thirteenfold covenant, as Thou didst in former days proclaim it to the modest one [Moses], even as it is written..." (then follow the verses Exodus 34:5–7a and 9b). In addition, two selichot: "Shelosh esreh middot" pizmon Ezkera Elohim of Amittai b. Shephatiah are about the attributes.
- In some communities, particularly those influenced by Lurianic Kabbalah, they are recited before every recitation of Tachanun.

== See also ==
- Chesed
- Thirteen Principles of Jewish Faith
- Attributes of God in Christianity
- Thirteen Rules of Rabbi Ishmael
