= Sefirot =

Ten emanations in Kabbalah

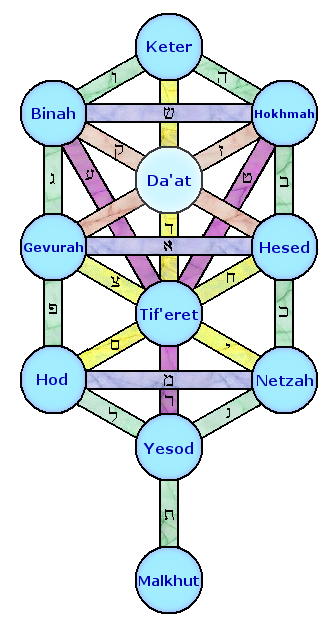
The Sefirot in Kabbalah
The Sefiroth in Jewish Kabbalah
View the image description page for this diagram	The Tree of Life

Sefirot (Hebrew: סְפִירוֹת, romanized: səp̄īrōṯ; sing. סְפִירָה, sĕfīrāh, lit. 'enumeration') (Note: Sefirot is alternatively transliterated as sephirot and sephiroth, with other singular forms being sefira and sephirah.) are the ten emanations or creative attributes of God in Kabbalah. The sefirot are the modes through which the Ein Sof (אֵין־סוֹף, 'Without-End') reveals itself and continuously creates both the physical realm and the seder hishtalshelut (סֵדֶר הִשְׁתַּלְשְׁלוּת, 'order [of cosmic] chaining')—the descending sequence of the metaphysical Four Worlds.

As revelations of God's will (רָצוֹן, rāṣon), the sefirot are understood not as ten gods but rather as ten channels through which the one God reveals his will. In later Kabbalistic literature, the ten sefirot may refer to the ten manifestations of God, the ten powers or faculties of the soul, or the ten structural forces of nature.

Alternative configurations of the sefirot are interpreted by various schools in the historical evolution of Kabbalah, with each articulating differing spiritual aspects. The tradition of enumerating 10 is stated in the Sefer Yetzirah: "Ten sefirot of nothingness, ten and not nine, ten and not eleven". As altogether eleven sefirot are listed across the various schemes, two (Keter and Da'at) are seen as unconscious and conscious manifestations of the same principle, conserving the 10 categories. The sefirot are described as channels of divine creative life force or consciousness through which the unknowable divine essence is revealed to humankind.

In Hasidic philosophy, which has sought to internalise the experience of Jewish mysticism into daily inspiration (devekut), this inner life of the sefirot is explored, and the role they play in humankind's service of God in this world.

== Terminology ==
The word "Sefirot" is derived from the Hebrew root ס־פ־ר, which forms the basis for the words book (ספר), story (סיפור), number (מספר) and sapphire (ספיר). Gershom Scholem writes that "as early as the Sefer ha-Bahir it is related to the Hebrew sappir ("sapphire"), for it is the radiance of God which is like that of the sapphire." (Note: See also Ginsburgh 2006) Some have suggested that the root could derive from the Akkadian word šiprum (meaning message or report); others have argued that the use of term 'sefirah' was influenced by the Greek word σφαῖρα ("sphere"). Both positions are disputed. (Note: Gershom Scholem, Kabbalah, 1974(?), page 99, "The term Sefirah is not connected with the Greek σφαῖρα ("sphere")")

Gershom Scholem writes "That many themes are united, or sometimes simply commingled, in this concept is demonstrated by the profusion of terms used to describe it." Scholem states that Kabbalists "employed a wealth of synonyms" and that the Sefirot are "also called ma'amarot and dibburim ("sayings"), shemot ("names"), orot ("lights"), kohot ("powers"), ketarim ("crowns"; since they are "the celestial crowns of the Holy King"), middot in the sense of qualities, madregot ("stages"), levushim ("garments"), marot ("mirrors"), neti'ot ("shoots"), mekorot ("sources"), yamim elyonim or yemei kedem ("supernal or primordial days"), sitrin (i.e., "aspects," found mainly in the Zohar), ha-panim ha-penimiyyot ("the inner faces of God")". Scholem adds that "A long list of other designations for the Sefirot can be found in Herrera, Sha'ar ha-Shamayim, 7:4."

== Ein Sof ==
The Ein Sof (lit: without end) is an important concept in Jewish Kabbalah. Generally translated as "infinity" and "endless", the Ein Sof represents the formless state of the universe before the self-materialization of God. In other words, the Ein Sof is God before he decided to become God as we now know him.

The sefirot are divine emanations that come from the Ein Sof in a manner often described as a flame. The sefirot emanate from above to below. As the first sefirah is closest to Ein Sof, it is the least comprehensible to the human mind, while in turn the last is the best understood because it is closest to the material world that humanity dwells on.

== Ten sefirot ==
The path of the flaming sword

The singular, sefira (ספירה səpirā), may have been a loanword from Koine Greek: σφαῖρα, lit. 'sphere'). However, early Kabbalists presented several other etymological possibilities: a "counting" or "enumeration"; or from the same triliteral root: sefer "text," sippur "recounting a story," sfar ("boundary" - ספר), and sofer, or safra "scribe"; or sappir "sapphire." This term had complex connotations within Kabbalah.

The original reference to the sefirot is found in the ancient Sefer Yetzirah "The Book of Formation," attributed to the first Jewish patriarch, Abraham. However, the names of the sefirot as given in later Kabbalah are not specified there, but rather are only identified by their attributes "forward," "backward," "right," "left," "down," "up," "light," "darkness," "good" and "evil." Further references to the sefirot, now with their later-accepted names, are elaborated on in the medieval Kabbalistic text of the Zohar, which is one of the core texts of Kabbalah.

In Cordoveran Kabbalah, the forces of creation are considered autonomous forces that evolve independently. By contrast, in Lurean or Lurianic Kabbalah (the Kabbalah of Isaac Luria), the sefirot are perceived as a constellation of forces in active dialogue with one another at every stage of that evolution. Luria described the sefirot as complex and dynamically interacting entities known as partzufim "faces," each with its own symbolically human-like persona.

Keter, the Crown, is the first sefirah. It is the superconscious intermediary between God and the other, conscious sefirot. Three different levels, or "heads," are identified within Keter. In some contexts, the highest level of Keter is called "The unknowable head," The second level is "the head of nothingness" (reisha d'ayin), and the third level is "the long head" (reisha d'arich). These three heads correspond to the superconscious levels of faith, pleasure and will in the soul.

The first sefirah, Keter, describes the divine superconscious Will that is beyond conscious intellect. The next three sefirot (Chokmah, Binah and Da'at) describe three levels of conscious divine intellect. In particular, Da'at represents Keter in its knowable form, the concept of knowledge. Will and knowledge are corresponding somewhat dependent opposites. The seven subsequent sefirot (Chesed, Gevurah, Tiferet, Netzach, Hod, Yesod and Malkuth) describe the primary and secondary conscious divine emotions. The sefirot of the left side and the sefirah of Malkuth are feminine, as the female principle in Kabbalah describes a vessel that receives the outward male light, then inwardly nurtures and gives birth to the sefirot below them. Kabbalah sees the human soul as mirroring the divine (after Genesis 1:27, "God created man in His own image, in the image of God He created him, male and female He created them"), and more widely, all creations as reflections of their life source in the sefirot. Therefore, the sefirot also describe the spiritual life of man, break down man's psychological processes, and constitute the conceptual paradigm in Kabbalah for understanding everything. This relationship between the soul of man and the divine gives Kabbalah one of its two central metaphors in describing divinity, alongside the other Ohr (light) metaphor. However, Kabbalah repeatedly stresses the need to avoid all corporeal interpretation. Through this, the sefirot are related to the structure of the body and are reformed into partzufim (personas). Underlying the structural purpose of each sefirah is a hidden motivational force which is understood best by comparison with a corresponding psychological state in human spiritual experience.

In its early 12th-century dissemination, Kabbalah garnered criticism from some rabbis who adhered to Jewish philosophy for its alleged introduction of diversity into Jewish monotheism. The seeming plurality of the One God is a result of the spiritual evolution of God's light, which introduced a diversity of emanations from the infinite divine essence. This was necessary due to the inability of humanity to exist in God's infinite presence. (Note: See, for example, the classic passage from the Zohar beginning "Elijah opened his discourse [...]" that is read every Friday afternoon to prepare for the Sabbath, in the Habad Siddur "Tehillat HaShem.") God does not change; rather, it is our ability to perceive his emanations that is modified. This is stressed in Kabbalah to avoid heretical notions of any plurality in the Godhead. One parable to explain this is the difference between the Ma'or "Luminary" and the ohr "Light" that it emanates, like the difference between the single body of the sun and the multiple rays of sunlight that illuminate a room.

=== Names in Cordoveran Kabbalah ===
In Kabbalah, there is a direct correspondence between the Hebrew name of any spiritual or physical phenomenon and its manifestations in the mundane world. The Hebrew name represents the unique essence of the object. This reflects the belief that the universe is created through the metaphorical speech of God, as stated in the first chapter of the Book of Genesis. Kabbalah expounds on the names of the sefirot and their nuances, including their gematria (numerical values), to reach an understanding of these emanations of God's essence.

In the 16th-century rational synthesis of Moses ben Jacob Cordovero (Cordoveran Kabbalah), the first complete systemization of Kabbalah, the sefirot are listed from highest to lowest:

Category:	Sefirah:
Super-conscious	1 Keter - "Crown"
Conscious intellect	2 Chokmah - "Wisdom" 3 Binah - "Understanding"
Conscious emotions	(Primary emotions:) 4 Chesed - "Kindness"; 5 Gevurah - "Discipline"; 6 Tiferet - "Glory" (Secondary emotions:); 7 Netzach - "Victory"; 8 Hod - "Splendour"; 9 Yesod - "Foundation" (Vessel to bring action:); 10 Malkuth - "Kingdom" Kingship

== Man-metaphor in Kabbalah ==
Kabbalah uses subtle anthropomorphic analogies and metaphors to describe God in Judaism, both the God-world relationship, and the inner nature of the divine. These include the metaphor of the soul-body relationship, the functions of human soul-powers, the configuration of human bodily form, and female-male influences in the divine. Kabbalists repeatedly warn and stress the need to divorce their notions from any corporality, dualism, plurality, or spatial and temporal connotations. As "the Torah speaks in the language of Man", the empirical terms are necessarily imposed upon human experience in this world. Once the analogy is described, its limitations are then related to stripping the kernel of its husk to arrive at a truer conception. Nonetheless, Kabbalists carefully chose their terminology to denote subtle connotations and profound relationships in the divine spiritual influences. More accurately, as they see the emanation of the material world from the spiritual realms, the analogous anthropomorphisms and material metaphors themselves derive through cause and effect from their precise root analogies on High.

Describing the material world below in general, and humans in particular, as created in the "image" of the world above is not restricted in Rabbinic Judaism to Kabbalah, but abounds more widely in Biblical, Midrashic, Talmudic and philosophical literature. Kabbalah extends the Man-metaphor more radically to anthropomorphise particular divine manifestations on high, while repeatedly stressing the need to divest analogies from impure materialistic corporality. Classical proof texts on which it bases its approach include, "From my flesh I envisage God", and the rabbinic analogy "As the soul permeates the whole body...sees but is not seen...sustains the whole body...is pure...abides in the innermost precincts...is unique in the body...does not eat and drink...no man knows where its place is...so the Holy One, Blessed is He..." Together with the metaphor of light, the Man-metaphor is central in Kabbalah. Nonetheless, it too has its limitations, needs qualification, and breaks down if taken as a literal, corporeal comparison. Its limitations include the effect of the body on the soul, while the World effects no change in God; and the distinct, separate origins of the soul and the body, while in relation to God's omnipresence, especially in its acosmic Hasidic development, all creation is nullified in its source.

== Inner dimensions and the powers of the soul ==
As all levels of Creation are constructed around the 10 sefirot, their names in Kabbalah describe the particular role each plays in forming reality. These are the external dimensions of the sefirot, describing their functional roles in channelling the divine, creative Ohr (Light) to all levels. As the sefirot are viewed to comprise both metaphorical "lights" and "vessels", their structural role describes the particular identity each sefirah possesses from its characteristic vessel. Underlying this functional structure of the sefirot, each one possesses a hidden, inner spiritual motivation that inspires its activity. This forms the particular characteristic of inner light within each sefirah.

Understanding the sefirot throughout Jewish mysticism is achieved by their correspondence to the human soul. This applies to the outer, Kabbalistic structure of the sefirot. It applies even more to their inner dimensions, which correspond to inner psychological qualities in human perception. Identifying the essential spiritual properties of the soul gives the best insight into their divine source, and in the process reveals the spiritual beauty of the soul. In Hasidic thought these inner dimensions of the sefirot are called the Powers of the Soul (Kochos HaNefesh). Hasidism sought the internalisation of the abstract ideas of Kabbalah, both outwardly in joyful sincerity of dveikus in daily life, acts of loving-kindness and prayer; and inwardly in its profound new articulation of Jewish mystical thought, by relating it to the inner life of man. Articulation of the sefirot in Hasidic philosophy is primarily concerned with their inner dimensions, and exploring the direct, enlivening contribution of each in man's spiritual worship of God. Kabbalah focuses on the esoteric manifestations of God in creation, the vessels of divinity. Hasidut looks at the lights that fill these vessels, how the structures reveal the divine essence, and how this inwardness can be perceived. This difference can be seen in the names of these two stages of Jewish mysticism. "Kabbalah" in Hebrew is derived from "kabal" (to "receive" as a vessel). "Hasidut" is from "chesed" ("loving-kindness"), considered the first and greatest sefirah, also called "Greatness", the wish to reveal and share. The names of the sefirot come from Kabbalah, and describe the Divine effect that each has upon Creation, but not their inner qualities. Hasidic thought uses new descriptive terms for the inner dimensions of the sefirot:

Sefirah: Outer function in Divinity and soul	Inner experience: Inner Divine motivation and human soul response
Above conscious: Keter-Crown	Essence of Keter: Emunah – "Faith" (expresses essence of soul in Infinite) Inner Keter: Taanug-unconscious source of "Delight" (soul rooted in delight) Outer Keter: Ratzon-unconscious transcendent "Will" (soul expresses through will)
First revelation of intellect: Chochmah-Insight of Wisdom	Bittul – "Selflessness" (Revelation inspires self nullification)
Grasped Intellect: Binah-Understanding	Simchah – "Joy" (Understanding awakens joy)
Assimilated Intellect: Daat-Knowledge	Yichud – "Union" (Union with idea awakens emotions)
Primary emotion of giving: Chesed-Loving-kindness	Ahavah – "Love" of God and Divine in all things (Response of Divine giving)
Primary emotion of restriction: Gevurah-Might/Severity	Yirah – "Fear" of God (Mystical awe of Divinity)
Primary emotion of balance: Tiferet-Beautiful harmony	Rachamim – "Mercy/Compassion" (Balances kindness with restriction)
Secondary emotion of giving: Netzach-Victory/Eternity	Bitachon – "Confidence" (Confidence inspires determination)
Secondary emotion of restriction: Hod-Splendour/Thanksgiving	Temimut – "Sincerity/Earnestness" (Sincere response to Divine Glory)
Secondary emotion of balance: Yesod-Foundation	Emet – "Truth" (Drive to verify connection in task)
Emotional vessel for action: Malchut-Kingship	Shechinah - "Divine Presence" (The Highest Light)

== The four worlds ==
These ten levels are associated with Kabbalah's four different "Worlds" or planes of existence, the main part from the perspective of the descending "chain of progression" (Seder hishtalshelut), that links the infinite divine Ein Sof with the finite, physical realm. In all Worlds, the 10 sefirot radiate, and are the divine channels through which every level is continuously created from nothing. Since they are the attributes through which the unknowable, infinite divine essence becomes revealed to the creations, all ten emanate in each World. Nonetheless, the structure of the Four Worlds arises because in each one, certain sefirot predominate. Each World is spiritual, apart from the lower aspect of the final World, which is the Asiyah Gashmi ("Physical Asiyah"), the physical Universe. Each World is progressively grosser and further removed from consciousness of the Divine, until in this World it is possible to be unaware of or to deny God. In descending order:

1. World of Emanation (Hebrew: אֲצִילוּת, Atzilut): In this level the light of the Ein Sof radiates and is united with its source. Divine Chochmah, the limitless flash of wisdom beyond grasp, predominates.
2. World of Creation (Hebrew: בְּרִיאָה, Beri'ah): This first world or level, is creation out of nothing--creatio ex nihilo--where the souls and angels have self-awareness, but without form. Divine Binah, the intellectual understanding, predominates.
3. World of Formation (Hebrew: יְצִירָה, Yetzirah): On this level, creation is related to form. The Divine emotional sefirot of Chesed to Yesod predominate.
4. World of Action (Hebrew: עֲשִׂיָּה, Assiah): On this level creation is relegated to its physical aspect, the only physical realm and the lowest World, this realm with all its creatures. The Divine Kingship of Malchut predominates, the purpose of Creation.

In the Zohar and elsewhere, there are these four Worlds or planes of existence. In the Lurianic system of Kabbalah, five Worlds are counted, comprising these and a higher, fifth plane, Adam Kadmon-manifest Godhead level, that mediates between the Ein Sof and the four lower Worlds.

As the four Worlds link the Infinite with this realm, they also enable the soul to ascend in devotion or mystical states, towards the Divine. Each World can be understood as descriptive of dimensional levels of intentionality related to the natural human "desire to receive", and a method for the soul's progress upward toward unity with or return to the Creator. (The terminology of this formulation is based on the exposition of Lurianic Kabbalah by the 20th century Kabbalist Yehuda Ashlag).

== See also ==
- Major Arcana
- Qliphoth
- The path of the flaming sword
