= Persico (surname) =

Persico is an Italian surname, which means Persian as in "Golfo Persico" (Italian for Persian Gulf). Notable people with the surname include:

- Aaron Persico (born 1978), Italian rugby player
- Alphonse Persico (born 1954), American mobster nicknamed "Allie Boy"
- Carmine Persico (1933 – 2019), American mobster
- Daniel Pérsico (born 1961), politician
- Enrico Persico (1900 – 1969), Italian physicist
- Ignatius Persico (1823 – 1895), Italian Cardinal
- Joseph E. Persico (1930 – 2013), author
- Lawrence T. Persico (born 1950), Bishop of Erie, Pennsylvania
- Salvatore Persico (1893 – 1974), birth name of baseball catcher Joe Smith
- Silvia Persico (born 1997), Italian cyclist
- Tomer Persico (born 1974), Israeli scholar

== See also ==
- Persico (disambiguation)
