= White Order of Thule =

U.S. white supremacist group

- Founded: mid-1990s
- Founder: Peter Georgacarakos, Michael Lujan, Joseph Kerrick
- Dissolved: 2000
- Type: Esoteric Neo-Nazism, Odinism, White supremacism
- Location: Deer Park, Washington
- Region served: United States

The White Order of Thule was a loosely organized American society formed in the mid-1990s by federal prisoner Peter Georgacarakos, art school graduate Michael Lujan and New Age occultist Joseph Kerrick. It described itself as an "esoteric brotherhood working toward the revitalization of the Culture-Soul of the European people". The Southern Poverty Law Center has described it as a racist hate group based in Deer Park, Washington. The group ceased publication of their newsletter Crossing the Abyss (for the first issue it was called simply "The Abyss") and announced that they were disbanding in 2000.

In 2005, a White Order of Thule blog was founded by Moody Lawless of the United Kingdom which was discontinued by 2011. This website reproduced much of the original material printed by the group in addition to new material.

== Membership ==
Membership of the order was limited to individuals of European descent over 18 years of age. Individuals seeking to join were required to send a 500 word autobiography including their views on culture, spirituality, history and politics. If deemed suitable, they would be sent an application. Aside from the "Degrees of Membership" and the "Membership Manual" the order suggested as study material works such as Mein Kampf, Imperium, Beyond Good and Evil, Might Is Right, Siege and Revolt Against the Modern World.

== Terrorism ==
In the 2002 white supremacist terror plot, Leo V. Felton and Erica Chase, a boyfriend/girlfriend team who claimed to belong to the White Order of Thule, were convicted of plotting to blow up landmarks associated with Jews and African Americans.

== See also ==
- 2002 white supremacist terror plot
- Thule Society
