= Kavanah =

Theological concept in Judaism about a worshiper's state of mind and heart

Kavanah (Hebrew: כַּוָּנָה, romanized: kawwānā, lit. 'intention'; pl. כַּוָּנוֹת, kawwānōt), (Note: Ashkenazi Hebrew pronunciation, [/kaˈvonə/]) also spelled kavvanah or kavana, is the intention, directed attention, and "sincere feeling" brought to prayer or the performance of a mitzvah in Judaism. It is a theological concept in Rabbinic Judaism about a worshiper's state of mind, heart, sincerity, devotion, and emotional absorption during prayer. It is the mindset often described as necessary for rituals and prayers. '

In Hasidic Judaism, a tradition emphasizing piety, kavana is the emotional devotion and self-effacing absorption during prayers rather than a liturgical, recitation-driven religiosity. In Kabbalah, esoteric Jewish mysticism, kavana refers to the practice where the devotee concentrates on the secret meanings of prayer letters and words, sometimes referring to the permutations of the Tetragrammaton. Some kavanot are particular to the tradition of Kabbalah during meditation.

Kavana is a much-debated subject among scholars, with traditional sources accepting that ritual without at least minimal kavana is insufficient. Different Jewish authorities see various levels of kavana required for various rituals, and especially for prayer. Some siddurim (prayerbooks) list the kavanot for particular prayers. Some kavanot are associated with specific Jewish holidays such as the Three Pilgrimage Festivals of Sukkot, Pesach, and Shavuot, and others.

== Discussion ==
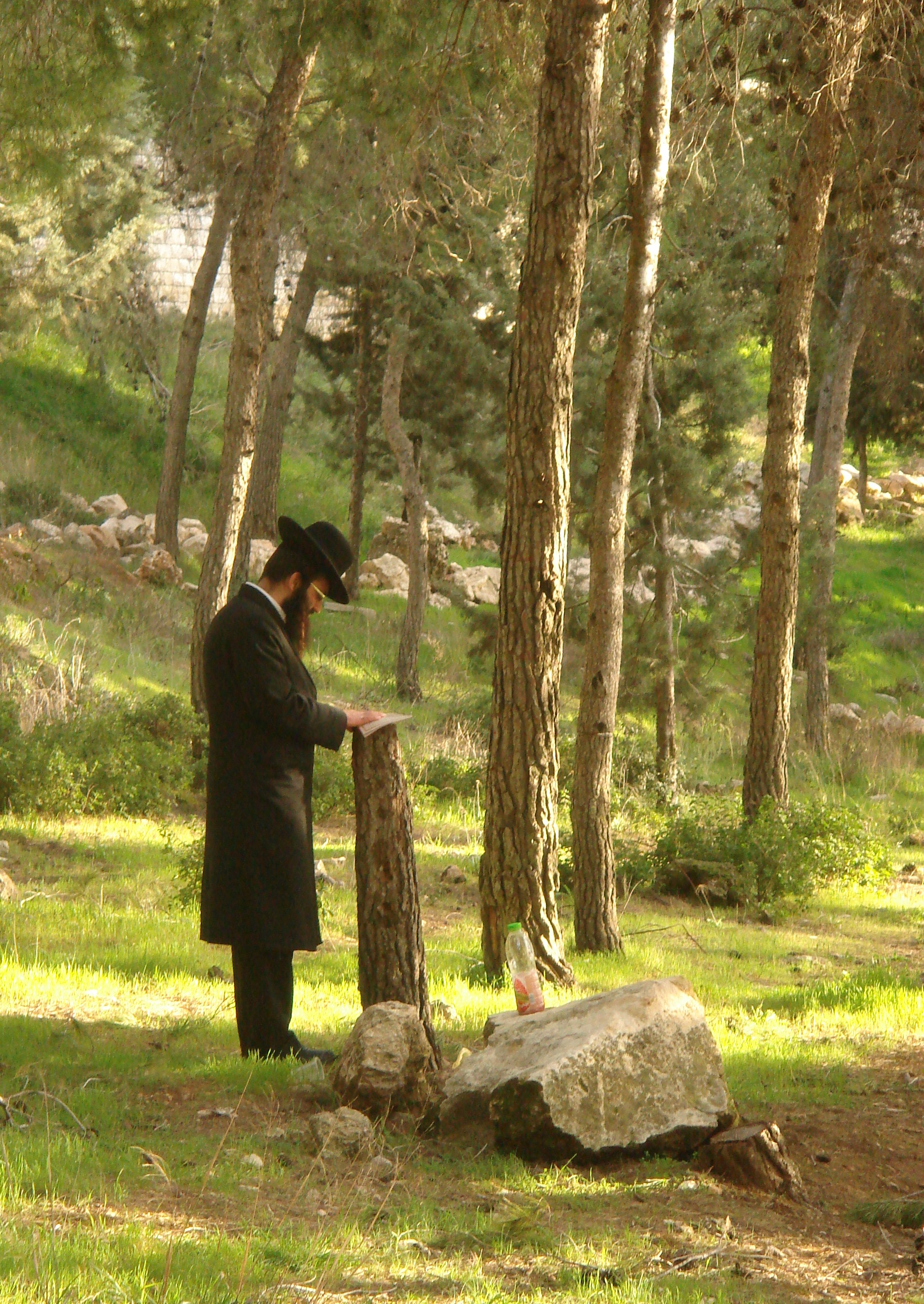
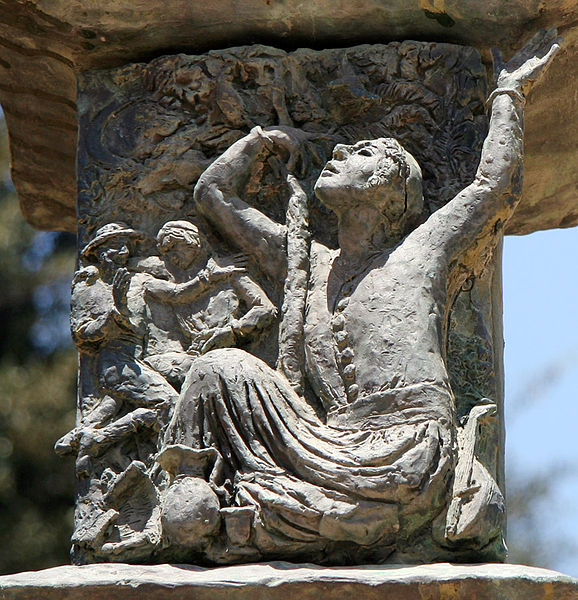
Kavanah connotes "intention and emotional devotionalism" during a prayer in Judaism.

Kavana comes from an ancient verbal root found where the object or subject is the heart. It connotes "to direct, to prepare, to establish", an orientation of mind, heart, intention. According to Moshe Halbertal, it implies concentration and sincerity, it is not rote recitation but the very essence of a prayer where the devotee expresses a plea and supplication to God, while believing, feeling, and meaning the prayer. Kavana is both emotional and intellectual devotion, states Herman Cohen. According to the rabbinic tradition, both action and proper intention is important during a prayer, and kavana refers to the latter. Pinchas Giller says kavanot are "ideas, texts and formulae" to be contemplated during praying.

Kavana in prayer requires devotional belief and not merely reciting the words of a prayer. According to Sutnick, this implies that the worshiper understand the words of the prayer and mean it, but this can be difficult for many Jews today when they pray using liturgical Hebrew, which many Jews outside of Israel do not understand.

In Hasidism, it is one of four themes of religious worship and spiritual striving. The true faithful constantly contemplates the presence of the divine (hitbonenut), constantly cleaves and communes with the divine (devequt), intensely ecstatically feels the divine (hitlahavut), and is intently devoted to this divine (kavana). "God was pleased with the heartfelt prayers and simple faith of ordinary Jews."

Kavana is therefore the strength that the devotee uses in the intention towards God: in other words, it is a sort of concentration followed by the truthful perception of a response to faith, that is, when one is certain that God listens, precisely during the ecstatic action of the bond with God, in this realization. According to the Hasidic tales, but not only, children also know how to reach a good level of kavana, and it isn't useless to teach them the Shema even before they perform the bar mitzvah.

=== In Chovot HaLevavot ===
Chovot HaLevavot "Duties of the Heart" by Bahya ibn Paquda (section 8, chapter 3), gives 3 general categories for kavana under the rubric "the different ways of serving God":

1. duties of the heart alone (which is the subject of his book) To be humble and reverence respect to God and to love God with all your heart, all your soul and all your strength (to love God with sincere and honesty) and keep your heart, your mind your thought to regard humility, reverence respect, to have good wills, loving kindness, morality & virtues towards God and another:
2. duties of the body and heart together, such as prayer, Torah study, praising and glorifying God, teaching wisdom, enjoining proper conduct, warning against evil, and the like;
3. duties of the limbs alone, in which the heart has no part except for initially directing the act to God, for example the sukkah, lulav, tzitzit, mezuzah, observing Shabbat and the festivals, tzedakah, and similar duties in which distraction by other thoughts does not harm the one who performs them.

=== Kabbalah ===
In Kabbalah, kavana often refers to the permutations of the divine name that aim at overcoming the separation of the forces in the Upper World.

== See also ==
- Jewish meditation
- Yichudim ("unifications")
- Shaar HaKavanot
- Niyyah, a similar concept in Islam
