= Yichudim =

Specific form of Jewish meditation in Kabbalistic Jewish mysticism

Yichudim (Hebrew: "Unifications") is a specific form of Jewish meditation in Kabbalistic Jewish mysticism, especially denoting the complete meditative method developed by Isaac Luria (1534–1572). The term Yichud is found in Halakha (Jewish law), denoting male-female "seclusion". In the esoteric anthropomorphism in Kabbalah, Yichudim denote unifications between male and female Divine aspects in the supernal sephirot.

== In the Zohar ==
The Zohar speaks of two types of Yichudim in general, a Yichud Mah u Ban and a Yichud Ava. These divine names derive from esoteric expansions of the Tetragrammaton, representing different supernal forces. Kabbalistic theosophy explores the esoteric function of Yichudim in the unfolding creation of the spiritual realms, while meditative Kabbalah experiences and influences these supernal forces through the human psyche, as mystical Kavanot intentions during prayer, Jewish observance, or isolated practice. Kabbalistic doctrine sees unifications in the divine realm among the sephirot, and between God and lower creation, as the theurgic restorative task of man. Among the sephirot this is symbolised by the unification of the revealed male principle Tiferet ("The Holy One Blessed be He") and the female Malkuth (which descends immanently into creation as the exiled Shekhina divine Presence).

=== Hasidic explanation of the Zohar ===
Yichud Mah u Ban in the human psyche is the unification of one's emotions with action.

Yichud Ava is the process whereby a Kabbalist traces an object or concept in this physical world, up through the various levels of God's creative process of that object or concept. The goal of a unification is twofold. One, to uncover the inherent Godliness in the subject that is being meditated on, and second, to bring the Godliness "back home", so to speak. Once the Godliness of the thing is uncovered, the Kabbalist will endeavour to conceptually understand how all the levels that once separated him and God are actually all one. Hasidic thought describes two levels of this Divine Yichud (Unity) with Creation: Yichuda Ila'ah (Higher Unity) in which Creation is nullified within the Divine totality, Yichudah Tata'ah (Lower Unity) in which Creation perceives its own existence dependent on God.

== Lurianic meditation system ==
Isaac Luria, the father of modern Kabbalah, developed the Zoharic references to Yichudim into a complete esoteric system of meditation, based on the new mythological scheme of Lurianic Kabbalah. Outwardly, the Zohar appears to be solely a theosophical text. However, through Luria's theosophical description of the cosmic structure as a complete interacting dynamic system, the soul of man embodies and dynamically interacts with the supernal processes of creation. Where Moses Cordovero previously developed a linear Zoharic method of meditation based on his conception of the sephirot as discreet powers, Luria's Yichudim meditation method is based on the sephirot as anthropomorphic mutually enclothing Partzufim (divine personas). His systemisation of Zoharic doctrine into a comprehensive process, enabled him to extract Yichudim meditation practices from the most esoteric descriptions in the Zohar. These elite meditative practices engaged the attention of subsequent Kabbalistic worship, and were further expanded, and practiced in a communal setting by Shalom Sharabi and the Beit El circle.

=== Example of Lurianic Yichudim meditation ===
In the same way that the Lurianic partzufim interact and enclothe within each other, so in Lurianic Yichudim meditations these supernal processes are theurgically enacted in the psyche by combining, and usually enclothing the letters of particular divine names within each other. A simple Yichud meditation example:

"The lower soul (nefesh) is from the Universe of Assiah, which is associated with the name Adonay ("Lord" the divine name associated with the Sefirah Malkuth). One should therefore meditate on the name Adony (ADNY) binding it to the name YHVH (Tetragrammaton name associated with the Sefirah Tiferet) in the Universe of Assiah. He should then bind this to the name Ehyeh (AHYH "I Am" associated with the Sefirah Keter) in the Universe of Assiah.

He should then meditate on this, elevating the name Ehyeh of Assiah, and binding it to Adonay of Yetzirah. Adonay of Yetzirah should then be bound to YHVH of Yetzirah.

One proceeds in this manner step by step, until he reaches Ehyeh of Atziluth. He should then bind Ehyeh of Atzilut to the very highest level, which is the Ein Sof."

Luria instructs many detailed and advanced Yichudim meditations for particular purposes. As well as Kavanot for prayer and to accompany Jewish observances, these include meditations enacted while prostrated on the grave of a saint, a practice of the 16th century Safed Kabbalists in order to commune with the righteous soul.

== Kavanot of prayer in Hasidism ==
The elaborate esoteric Lurianic Yichudim to accompany liturgical prayer were replaced in early 18th century Hasidism by new Jewish meditation forms taught by the Baal Shem Tov, based on its concern with deveikut direct internal consciousness of divinity. However, a very small number of extant Yichudim for other purposes, taught by the Baal Shem Tov, are recorded in early Hasidic texts.

== See also ==
- Kavanah
- Zeir Anpin
