= Congregation Beth Sholom =

Synagogue in San Francisco, CA, US

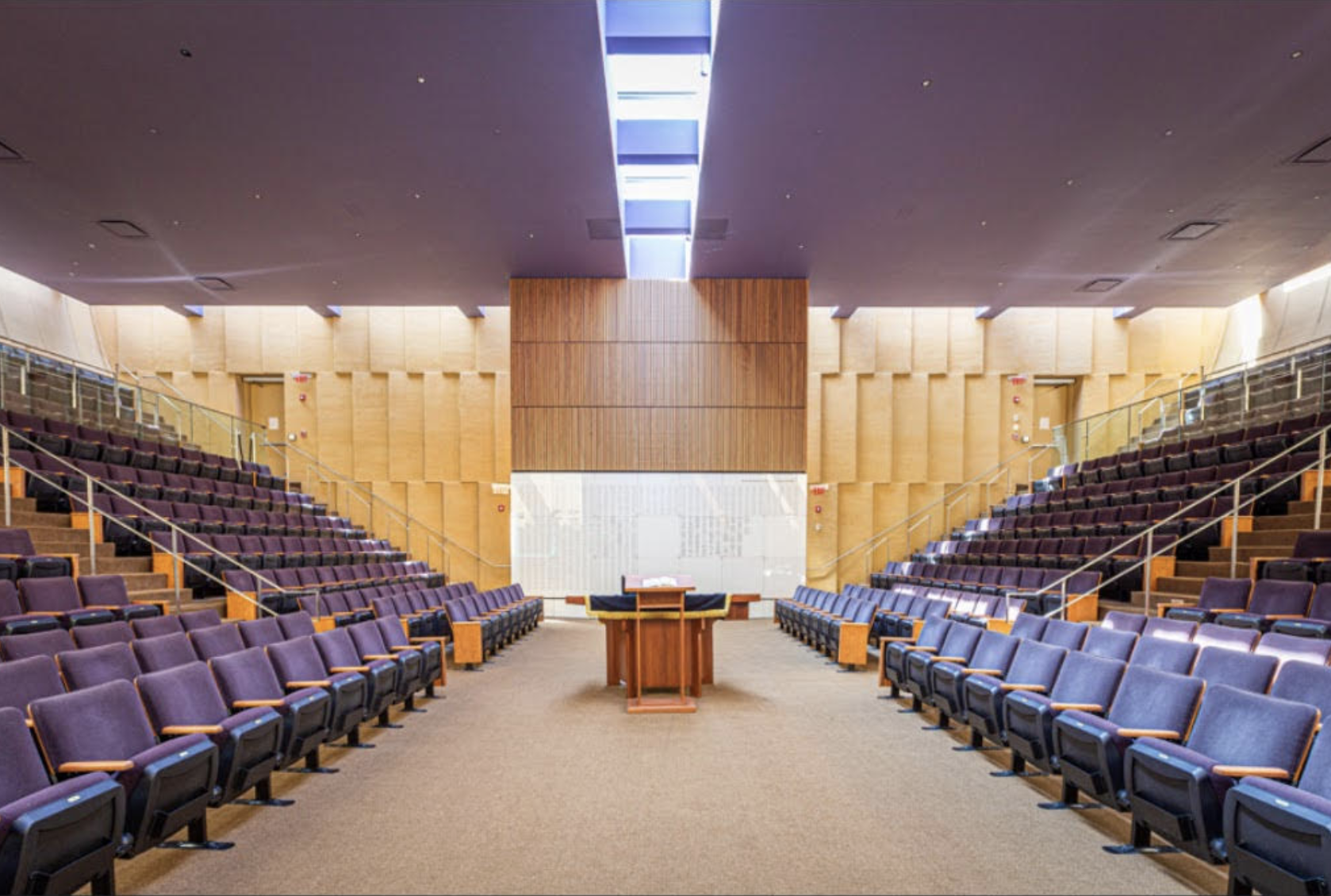
- The synagogue interior

- Location in San Francisco Bay Area, California

Religion
- Affiliation: Conservative Judaism
- Ecclesiastical or organisational status: Synagogue
- Leadership: Rabbi Amanda Russell
- Status: Active

Location
- Location: 301 14th Avenue, San Francisco, California
- Country: United States
- Coordinates: 37°46′59″N 122°28′24″W

Architecture
- Architect: Stanley Saitowitz
- Type: Synagogue architecture
- Style: Modernist
- Established: 1921 (as a congregation)
- Completed: 1934 (14th Ave. & Clement St.); 2008 (14th Avenue)

Website
- bethsholomsf.org

Congregation Beth Sholom is a Conservative Jewish congregation and synagogue, located at 301 14th Avenue, in San Francisco, California, in the United States.

== History ==
Founded in 1921, it is one of the oldest synagogues west of the Mississippi River. A member of the United Synagogue of Conservative Judaism, Congregation Beth Sholom is a hub of the Bay Area Jewish community. Beth Shalom built a synagogue on Fourteenth Avenue and Clement Street in 1934 after initially meeting in a church on Fourth Avenue near Geary. The first full-time rabbi, Saul White, age 27 and born and raised in Russian Poland, was hired in 1935. The first bat mitzvah, for Judith Stein, was held at the synagogue in 1957.

The congregation moved to a new synagogue designed by architect Stanley Saitowitz in 2008. In 2022, Rabbi Amanda Russell was promoted to the position of senior rabbi, the first woman to hold the position in the congregation.

== Rabbinical leaders ==
The following individuals have served as rabbi of Congregation Beth Sholom:

| Ordinal | Officeholder | Term start | Term end | Time in office | Notes |
|---|---|---|---|---|---|
| 1 | Saul E. White | 1934 | 1983 | 48–49 years | |
| 2 | Allan Schranz | 1983 | 1986 | 2–3 years | |
| 3 | Alexander Graubart | 1986 | 1991 | 4–5 years | |
| 4 | Alan Lew | 1991 | 2005 | 13–14 years | |
| 5 | Kenneth Leitner | 2005 | 2007 | 1–2 years | |
| 6 | Micah Hyman | 2007 | 2014 | 6–7 years | |
| 7 | Aubrey Glazer | 2014 | 2018 | 3–4 years | |
| 8 | Dan Ain | 2018 | 2022 | 3–4 years | |
| 9 | Amanda Russell | 2022 | incumbent | 3–4 years | |

== See also ==
- History of the Jews in San Francisco
