= New England Holocaust Memorial =

Memorial in Boston, Massachusetts, U.S.

Coordinates: 42.36125°N 71.05727°W

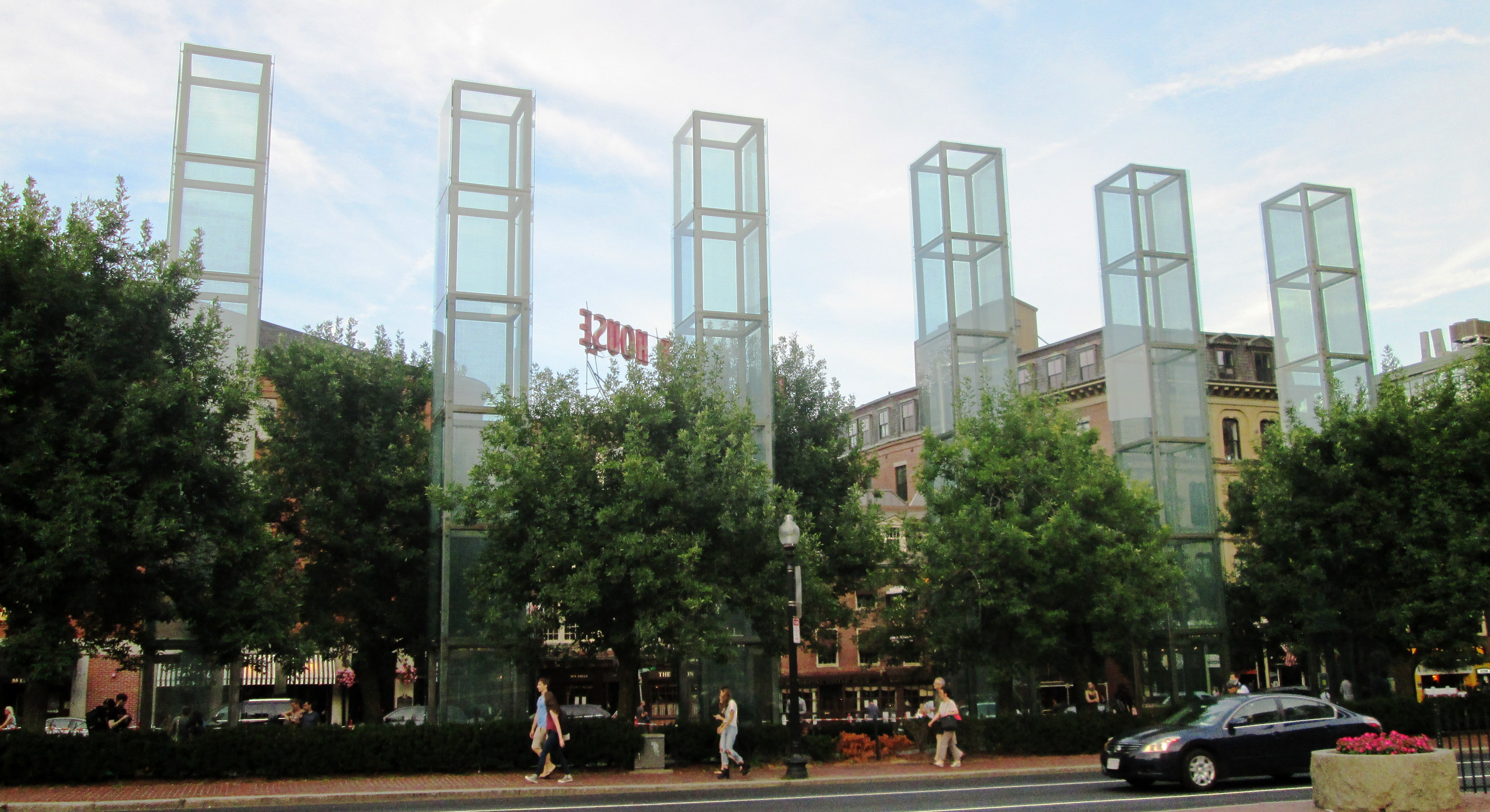
- The memorial as seen from the Boston City Hall Plaza stairs (2017)

General information
- Location: 98 Union St, Boston, Massachusetts
- Inaugurated: October 22, 1995

Height
- Height: 16.5 m (54 ft)

Design and construction
- Architect: Stanley Saitowitz

The New England Holocaust Memorial in Boston, Massachusetts, is dedicated to the Jewish people who were murdered by Nazi Germany during the Holocaust.

== Description ==
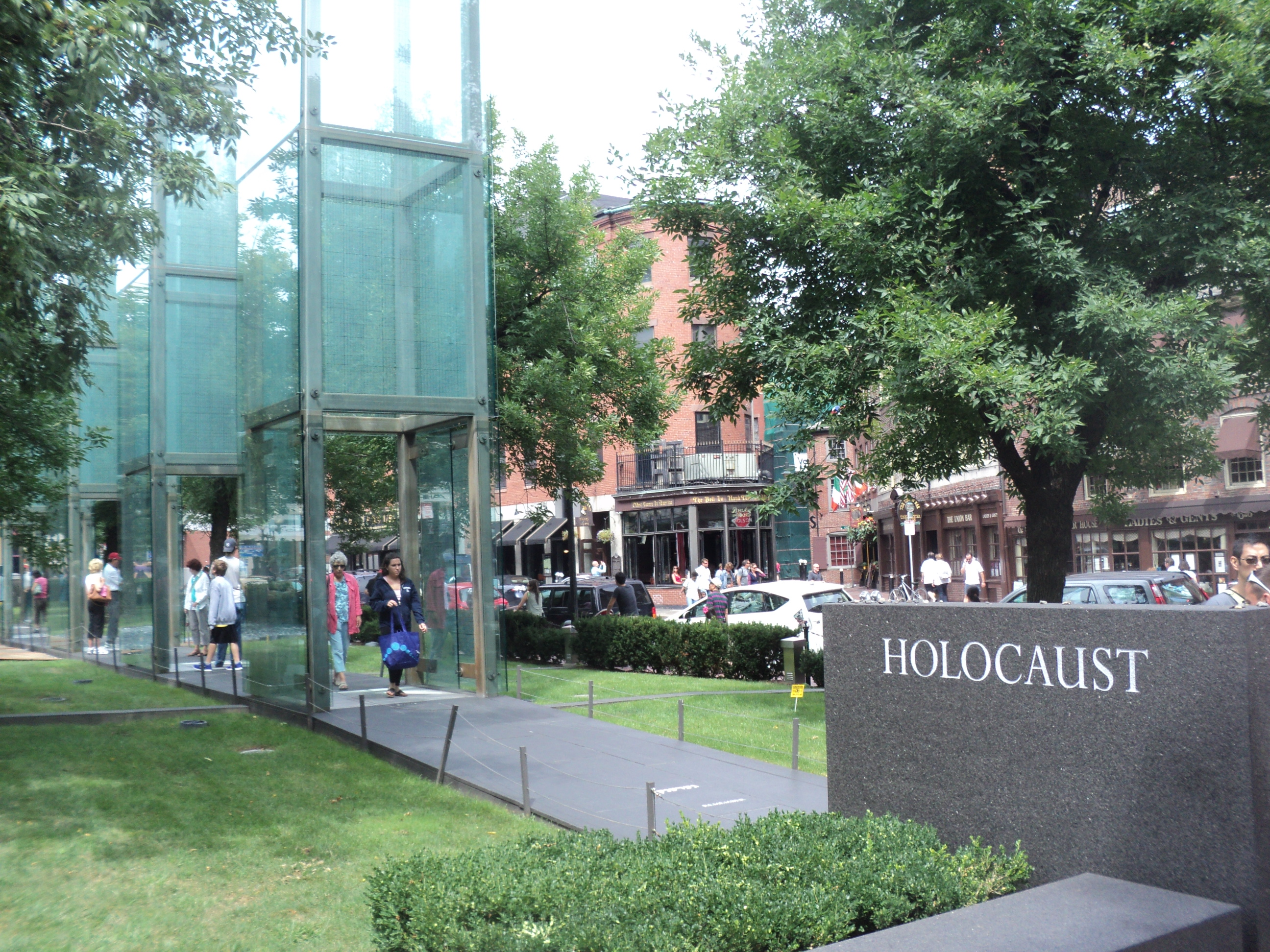
The memorial at grade level

Founded by Stephan Ross, a Holocaust survivor, and erected in 1995, the memorial consists of six glass towers under which visitors may walk. Engraved on the outside walls of each tower are groups of numbers representing the six million Jews murdered in the Holocaust. Inscribed on the inner walls are quotes from survivors of each camp. Underneath the towers, steam rises up through metal grates from a dark floor with twinkling lights on it.

Panel of Memorial

Each tower symbolizes a different major extermination camp (Majdanek, Chełmno, Sobibor, Treblinka, Bełżec, and Auschwitz-Birkenau), as well as menorah candles, the six million Jews murdered in the Holocaust (one million per tower), and the six years that the mass extermination took place, 1939-1945. Each tower consists of twenty-four individual panels of glass. Twenty-two of the panels are inscribed with seven digit numbers and two of the panels are inscribed with messages. In total, there are 132 panels from the six towers inscribed with numbers; however, each panel is identical. A single panel contains 17,280 unique numbers which are subsequently repeated throughout the memorial. Numbers are arranged in eight by ten blocks, with each block consisting of sets of six numbers arranged in a six by six grid. In total there are 2,280,960 non-unique numbers listed on the 132 panels. A digital tour, which explains some holocaust history and meaning behind the monument, is available through QR codes as of July 2021.

The New England Holocaust Memorial is located a few steps off the Freedom Trail, making it a popular tourist attraction.

The site is located in Carmen Park, along Congress and Union Streets, near Faneuil Hall. Carmen Park was named in recognition of William Carmen's service to the community and his vision and leadership in creating the New England Holocaust Memorial.

== Messages ==
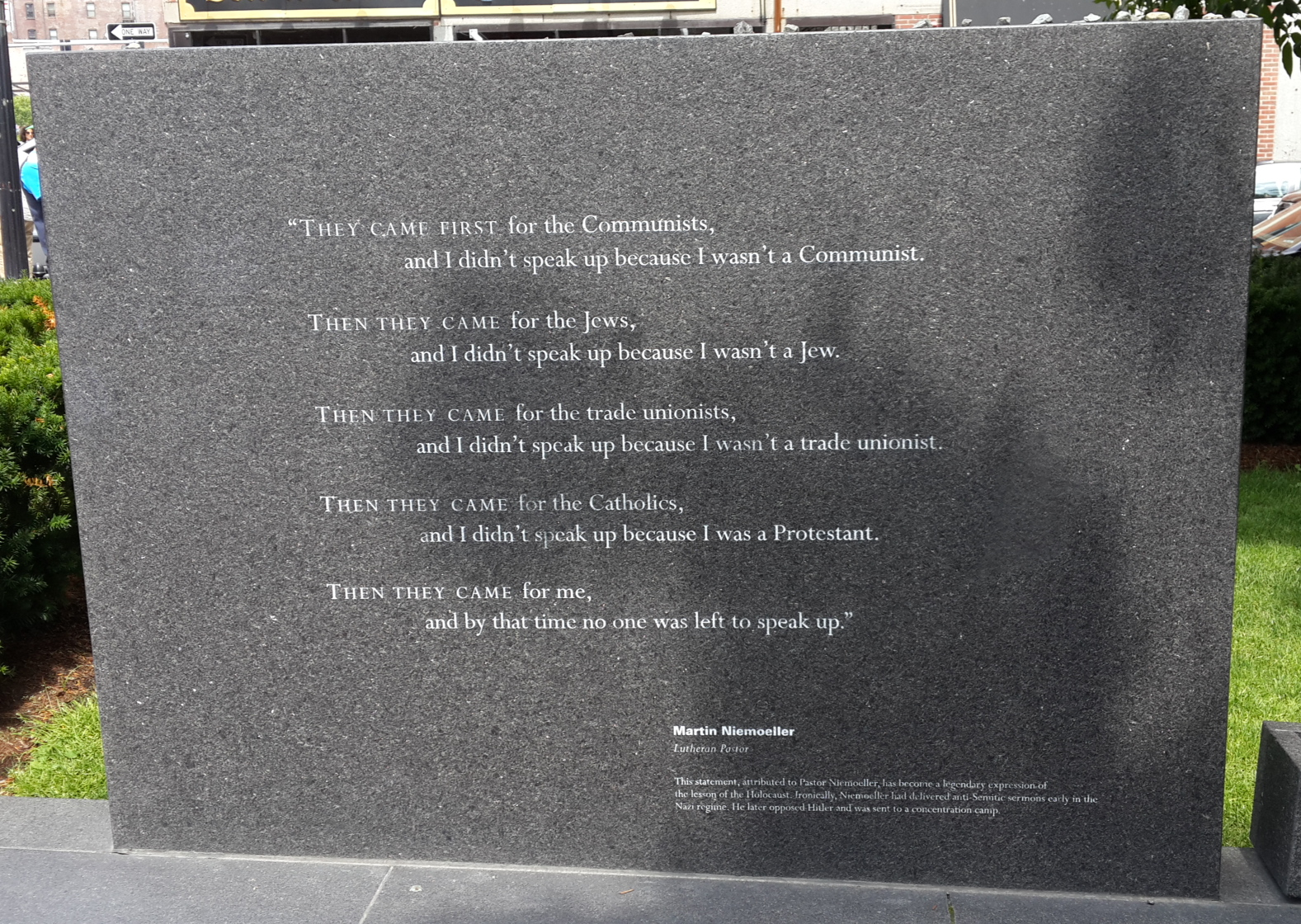
Engraving of the poem First They Came...

On some of the panels of the glass towers are messages, for instance the Sobibor tower includes the following:

FROM OUR BARRACKS we could see
the gas chambers.
A heart-rending cry of women and
children reached us there.
We were overcome
by a feeling of helplessness.
There we were, watching and
unable to do anything.

WE HAD ALREADY worked out
a plan of escape.
But at that moment I decided —
We must not simply escape.
We must destroy the fascists and the camp.
Alexander Pechersky

— New England Holocaust Memorial

ILSE, A CHILDHOOD FRIEND of mine,
once found a raspberry in the camp
and carried it in her pocket all day
to present to me that night on a leaf.

IMAGINE A WORLD in which
your entire possession is
one raspberry and
you gave it to your friend.
Gerda Weissmann Klein

— New England Holocaust Memorial

== Threats and vandalism ==
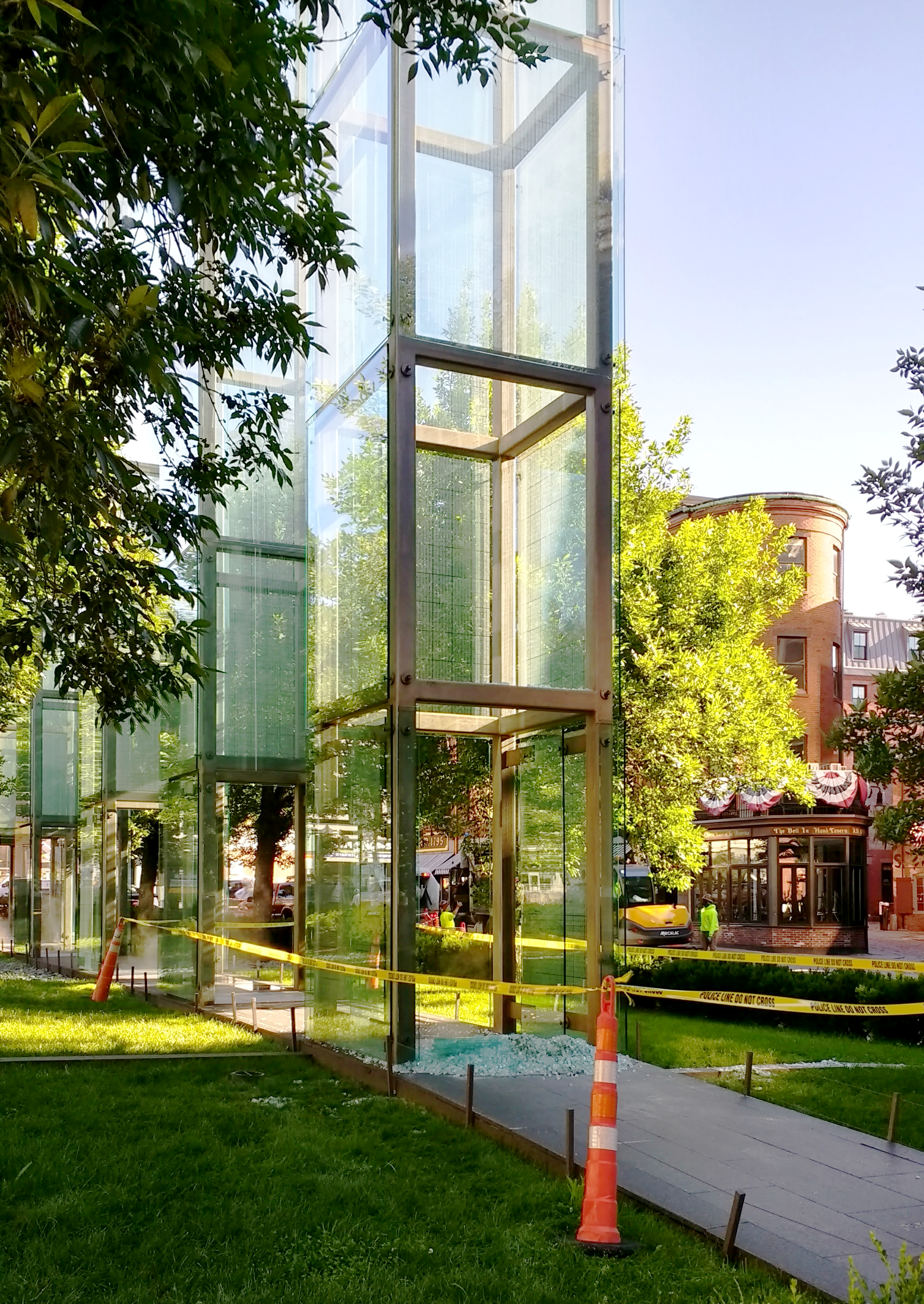
The June 2017 vandalism of the New England Holocaust Memorial.

The Boston memorial as well as the United States Holocaust Memorial Museum in Washington, D.C., was targeted for destruction in a 2002 white supremacist terror plot by a neo-Nazi and his white supremacist girlfriend. In the 2002 federal trial, the jury convicted both defendants on all counts.

In the early morning hours of June 28, 2017, one of the 9-foot (2.7 m) glass panels on the memorial was smashed with a rock. The 21-year-old suspect was charged with malicious destruction of property and destruction of a place of memorial. The suspect was denied bail due to violations of probation. The lawyer for the suspect said he has mental health issues.

On August 14, 2017, the memorial was damaged for the second time in two months by a 17-year-old who threw a rock at one of the glass panels. The suspect was quickly accosted and restrained by a Drug Enforcement Administration Special Agent and Boston firefighter, both of whom were off duty, until Boston police could take the suspect into custody. Initial charges of willful destruction of property were quickly filed, and the incident is under investigation as a possible hate crime.

On March 22, 2021, members of the Nationalist Social Club photographed themselves in front of the memorial and posted it to social media. This was viewed by many American Jews as a provocation.

In February 2023, the memorial was again desecrated.
