= Persico =

Persico may refer to:

- Persico (surname), an Italian surname
- Persico Marine, High performance boat builders
- Persico Dosimo, municipality in the province of Cremona, Lombardy, Italy
- Zelo Buon Persico, municipality in the province of Lodi, Lombardy, Italy

== See also ==
- Persic
