= 2002 white supremacist terror plot =

Bombings targeting Jews and African Americans

In 2002, a pair of white supremacists planned to bomb a series of institutions and people associated with African American and American Jewish communities.

== Crime ==
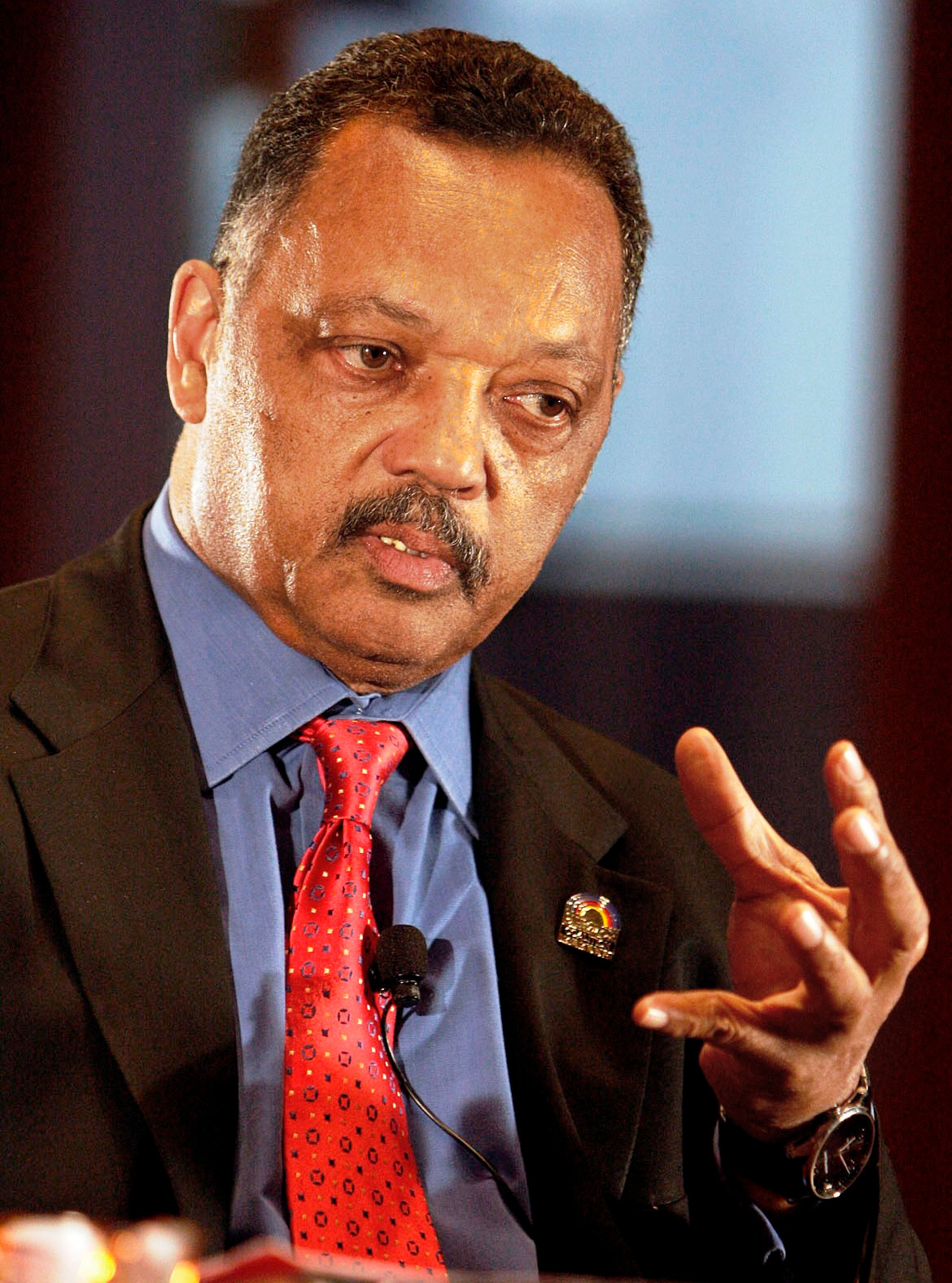
Jesse Jackson was a target of the terror plot.

Leo Felton and Erica Chase, a boyfriend and girlfriend team, planned to blow up a museum with a fertilizer bomb, as was used in the Oklahoma City bombing. Felton wanted to rid the United States of those he called "mud people"; Asians, Blacks, Latinos and Jews. A member of the White Order of Thule, Felton was also ironically part African American. Chase was a member of the World Church of the Creator.

Felton then robbed a bank with a friend from prison and forged money in order to buy materials to create a fertilizer bomb.

Targets included the United States Holocaust Museum, the New England Holocaust Memorial; well-known American Jews, including Steven Spielberg; and black leaders, including Rev. Jesse Jackson. In April 2001, an attendant at a donut shop spotted a counterfeit $20 bill that Chase tried to pass him. He alerted an off-duty Boston police officer, who then arrested Chase and Felton.

A subsequent search of Felton's apartment yielded large quantities of evidence, including self-drawn cartoons of Felton blowing up the Boston offices of the Anti-Defamation League.

== Trial and sentencing ==
The trial resulted in a conviction for both Felton and Chase on charges of conspiracy to commit bank robbery and plotting to blow up landmarks associated with Jews and African-Americans. Felton was sentenced to 21 years in prison, while Chase was sentenced to 57 months, although Judge Nancy Gertner had set aside the jury's conviction on a gun possession charge.

A federal appeals court reinstated the gun charge in 2005, requiring Gertner to decide on appending longer sentences within a surplus of five years on Chase and Felton; in 2006, Gertner added a full five years to Felton's sentence (resulting in an increase from 21 years and 10 months to 26 years and 10 months), while only three months were added to Chase's sentence, with the judge stating that she'd "made a profound change in her life".

== See also ==
- Los Angeles Jewish Community Center shooting
- United States Holocaust Memorial Museum shooting
- Terrorism in the United States
- List of attacks on Jewish institutions in the United States
- Murder of James Byrd Jr.
