= Stanley Saitowitz =

American designer

Stanley Saitowitz is an American designer. He was born in Johannesburg, South Africa, in 1949.

He received his Bachelor of Architecture at the University of Witwatersrand in 1974. He received a Masters in Architecture from the University of California, Berkeley in 1977.

Saitowitz is Emeritus Professor of Architecture at the University of California, Berkeley, and is Design Principal with Natoma Architects Inc. based in San Francisco, California.

Saitowitz is well-known and influential in the Bay area architecture scene. He is known for his "monochromatic" and "machine-like" architecture, a "strident form of Modernism". His design for the Beth Sholom Synagogue (2008) in San Francisco garnered international praise and awards, such as the High Commendation Award, Religion & Contemplation at the 2008 World Architecture Festival 2008. At the same time, the Synagogue received critiques from local residents.

== Awards ==
- Harleston Parker Medal for his work on the New England Holocaust Memorial (1997)
- His Transvaal House was named a National Monument by the Monuments Council in South Africa (1997)
- Finalist for Smithsonian Cooper Hewitt National Design Award (2006)
- The Tampa Museum of Art, designed by Saitowitz, won the American Architecture Award from Chicago Athenaeum: Museum of Architecture and Design and the European Centre for Architecture Art Design and Urban Studies in 2010.
- 12th Sophia Gray Memorial Lecture Laureate (2000)

== Notable buildings designed by Saitowitz ==
- UCR/California Museum of Photography
- New England Holocaust Memorial, Boston, MA
- Tampa Museum of Art, Tampa, FL
- Beth Sholom Synagogue in San Francisco, CA
- Beth El Synagogue, La Jolla, CA
- 8 Octavia, San Francisco, CA
- Yerba Buena Lofts, San Francisco, CA
- Oxbow School, Napa, CA
