= Alan Lew =

American rabbi and author (1943–2009)

Alan Lew (1943–2009) was a Conservative rabbi best known for establishing the world's first Jewish meditation center and for his work bridging Jewish and Buddhist traditions. Lew was often described as "the Zen rabbi," a phrase that he himself used in the title of his book One God Clapping: The Spiritual Path of a Zen Rabbi.

== Biography ==
Born in Brooklyn, New York, Lew grew up in a secular Jewish household. In the 1960s, he experimented with Asian spiritual practices and eventually discovered Zen Buddhism. When preparing for ordination as a Zen Buddhist priest, he had an epiphany regarding his Jewish identity which set him on a path to exploring Judaism. Lew went on to become a Conservative rabbi, serving as the rabbi of Congregation Eitz Chaim (Monroe, NY) and then leading Congregation Beth Sholom (San Francisco, California), California, and focusing on teaching meditation in Jewish contexts. He established the Makor Or meditation center at Beth Sholom, the world's first synagogue-based Jewish meditation center. He has been noted for his books and for his work on how meditation plays an important role in the process of teshuvah (repentance).

Lew is the father of singer-songwriter Hannah Lew, of Grass Widow and Cold Beat.

== Selected works ==
- Be Still and Get Going: A Jewish Meditation Practice for Real Life (2007)
- This Is Real and You Are Completely Unprepared: The Days of Awe as a Journey of Transformation (2003)
- One God Clapping: The Spiritual Path of a Zen Rabbi (1999)
