= Tomer Persico =

Israeli scholar

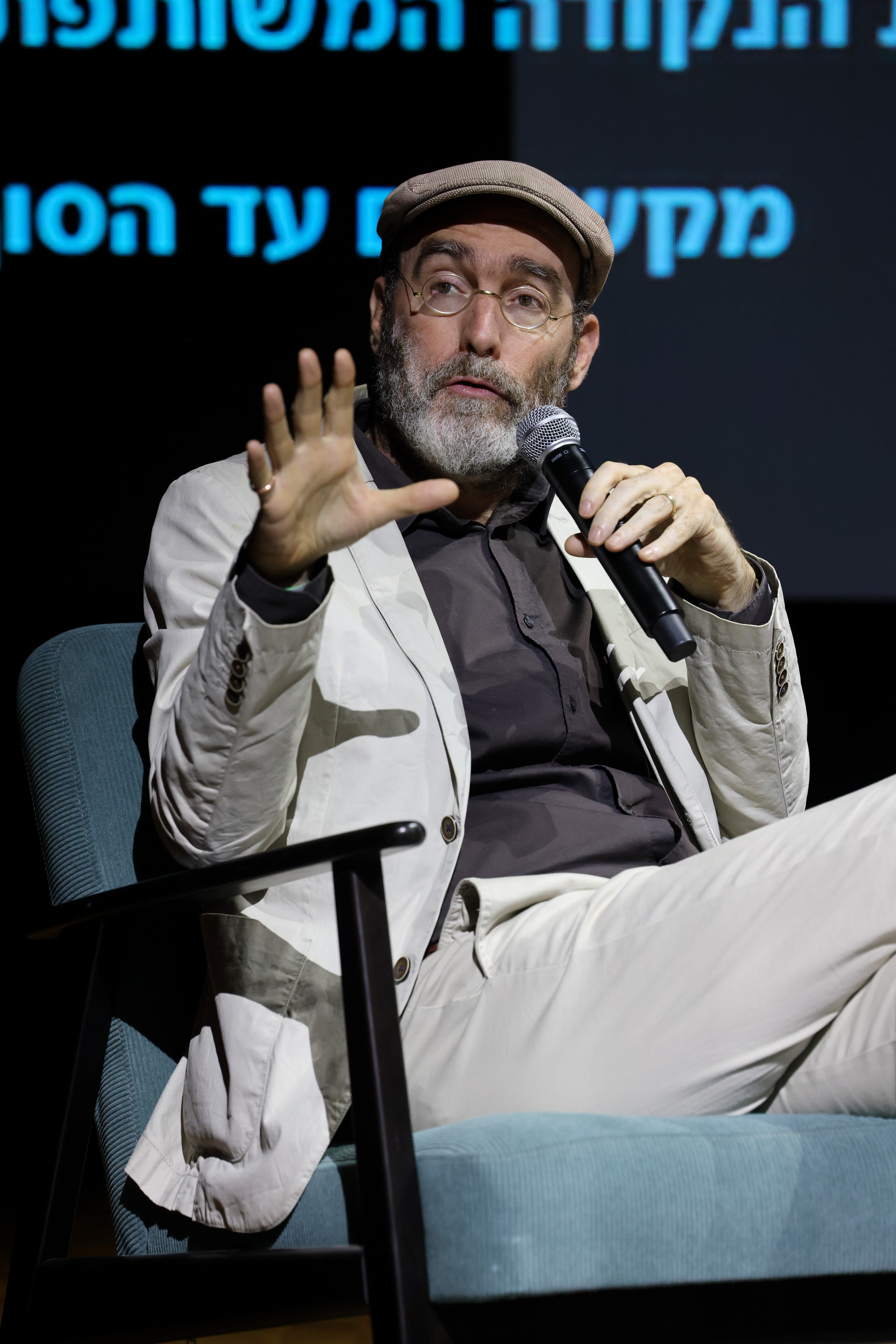
Tomer Persico

Tomer Persico (Hebrew: תומר פרסיקו; born May 7, 1974) is an Israeli scholar of religion, writer, and public intellectual. His research and public writing focus on the history of ideas, Jewish modern identity, forms of secularization and religiosity, and the liberal order, with particular attention to the theological origins of modern notions of individualism, rights, and autonomy. He is also recognized for his contributions to Jewish mysticism and meditation, as well as his involvement in contemporary debates on religion and politics in Israel and the West.

== Biography ==
Tomer Persico grew up in a secular family in Nave Sha'anan, Haifa. Upon completing his military service, he went on a two-year trip to India. There, he was exposed to Meditation, Buddhism, and Eastern religions. In 1997, he returned to Israel and earned a BA in the department of philosophy at the University of Haifa, while simultaneously becoming closer to traditional Judaism. Today, he considers himself religious. In 2004, he submitted his Master’s thesis to the Hebrew University of Jerusalem, under the supervision of Guy Stroumsa, titled: "The Return - A Model of Mystical Ascension as Demonstrated Through the Works of R. Abraham Isaac Kook and Meister Eckhart.", completing his Master's degree with honors. In 2012, he submitted his doctoral dissertation as part of the contemporary religions program at Tel Aviv University. The dissertation, supervised by Prof. Ron Margolin, was titled: "Jewish Meditation - The Development of Modern Spiritual Practices in Contemporary Judaism." From 2014 to 2015, he conducted Post-doctoral research at Ben-Gurion University of the Negev, J. R Elyachar Center for Studies in Sepharadi Heritage.

Persico worked as a high-school teacher of bible and Israeli culture at the Hebrew Reali School in Haifa and conducted courses at the Avshalom Institute and the Open University’s "Ascolot" program. He taught at the Secular Yeshiva in Jerusalem and the BINA Beth midrash in Jerusalem. He lectured at the school of philosophy at Tel Aviv University on New Age culture and its manifestations in contemporary Judaism. He served as the academic director of Alma: Home for Hebrew Culture (Tel Aviv, Israel) and Kolot Beit Midrash.

Since 2015, he has been a research fellow at the Shalom Hartman Institute. Between 2018 and 2021, he served as the Koret visiting assistant professor of Jewish and Israel Studies, Department of Near Eastern Studies, Helen Diller Institute at the University of California, Berkeley and the Shalom Hartman Institute Bay Area scholar in residence. From 2021 to 2026, he was a Rubinstein fellow and chief editor of the 'Challenges of Democracy' book series for the Rubinstein Center for constitutional challenges at Reichman University, editing seven books on Liberalism and Democracy in Israel, including one by former Chief Justice of Israel’s Supreme Court, Aharon Barak.

He has written hundreds of opinion articles in Haaretz, and Ynet, The Washington Post, Israel Hayom, The Times of Israel, Persuasion, +972 Magazine, The Jewish Journal of Greater Los Angeles, Shakuf, HaAyin HaShevi'it, NRG360, and Mako.

He conducts Jewish weddings to provide an alternative to Israel’s Chief Rabbinate.

== Personal life ==
Tomer Persico resides in Talpiot, Jerusalem with his wife and two boys. His wife, Yael Yechieli, directs the "5050 Partnership and Gender Equality" initiative.

== Books ==
=== Author ===
- The Jewish Meditative Tradition (Hebrew, Tel Aviv University Press, 2016)

This book analyzes the historical progression of Jewish meditative traditions and their contemporary integration into a framework of psychological interiority. By applying a systematic typology to practices spanning from the Second Temple era to Hasidism, the study identifies a shift in the Western religious landscape toward the prioritization of internal experience over external ritual. Persico evaluates the pedagogical approaches of seven modern spiritual figures—Kalonymus Kalman Shapira, Menachem Eckstein, Aryeh Kaplan, Zalman Schachter-Shalomi, Israel Isaac Besancon, Erez Moshe Doron, and Yitzchak Ginsburgh—to determine the precise balance of traditional continuity and modern innovation within their respective systems.

- In God's Image: How Western Civilization Was Shaped by a Revolutionary Idea [Hebrew], Tel Aviv: Yedioth Sefarim, 2021, [English], New York University Press, 2025.

This book examines Western intellectual history through the evolution of the biblical concept of the "Image of God," identifying it as the foundational catalyst for modern individualism, liberty, and secularization. By tracing the development of human autonomy from Hebrew scripture through Christian thought, the study demonstrates how this theological premise underpinned the rise of human rights, abolitionism, and the eventual emergence of the liberal order. The research posits that the West's global hegemony is fundamentally rooted in a unique form of individualism derived from this concept, which ironically facilitated secularist shifts and the institutional separation of religion and state while driving unprecedented societal prosperity.

The English edition of the book was reviewed by The Wall Street Journal, Christianity Today, Publishers Weekly, The New Criterion, and Library Journal.

- Liberalism: Its Roots, Values and Crises [Hebrew], Kinneret Zmora-Bitan Dvir, 2024; Liberalismus: Seine Wurzeln, Grundsätze und Krisen [German], NZZ Libro. 2025.

This book examines the historical foundations of liberalism since the late Middle Ages, defining it as a political framework predicated on the protection of individual autonomy through universal rights and the limitation of state intervention. By identifying essential human equality before the law as the movement’s core logic, he evaluates the current crisis of identity facing the liberal order following its post–Cold War hegemony. The study investigates how contemporary opposition—ranging from right-wing populism to radical anti-liberalism and religious fundamentalism—exploits this instability, concluding with a localized assessment of these global tensions within the Israeli context and proposing potential recovery strategies.

=== Editor ===
The Jubilee Haggadah, SISO and Tel Aviv: The Israeli Center for Libraries, 2017.

== Selected articles ==
Persico argues that Zionism maintains a complex relationship with the Temple Mount. While secular Zionists historically prioritized pragmatism and shunned religious holy sites, and while right-wing groups emphasized sovereignty and saw the Temple Mount as a national focal point, religious Zionists only recently shifted from their stance of avoidance to active engagement. He surveys these evolving attitudes, examining the site's role as an ethnonational focal point within the context of secularization. In his view, Hasidism remains a primary resource for Jewish spiritual renewal. As a modern revival movement, its theological and ethical frameworks are frequently adapted by both observant and nonobservant thinkers. This contemporary appropriation, termed Neo-Hasidism, represents a conscious effort to utilize Hasidic elements for spiritual revitalization. Persico asserts that to address the contemporary demand for inner spiritual development, Breslov leadership has modified Hitbodedut meditation to align with New Age spiritual trends. Contemporary teachers adapt Rabbi Nachman’s original practice by incorporating external elements while omitting traditional components. He examines the socio-political motivations behind these reinterpretations and the resulting complications within the Breslov framework. Persico explored the "utilitarian self" that, since the 1990s, has emerged within Israeli spirituality, blending Romanticism and Enlightenment rationalism through capitalist instrumental reason. Visible in Neo-Kabbalah and Neo-Hasidic movements, this framework treats spiritual practice as a technical means to optimize internal capabilities and external life conditions.

Persico identifies the antisemitism from the Radical Left as “new”, in that it perceives the Jews not as a foreign agent threatening to control or contaminate the antisemites’ own, but as the root and essence of Western civilization. Understanding the West as inherently sinful, the Jews now become the root cause of evil, which must therefore be uprooted and erased for the West to cleanse and redeem itself.

Persico identifies four overlapping groups in contemporary Jewish fundamentalism, which he defines as a severe narrowing down of the interpretative spectrum of tradition, a rejection of modern enlightenment values, and an adoption of a monolithic view of history, in which nothing fundamental ever changes: the Hardal extremist Religious Zionists, the Kahanists, the Hilltop Youth, and the Temple Mount Faithful. He claims that they all strive, through different paths, to turn Israel into a Theocracy.
