= Jewish meditation =

Meditation in Judaism

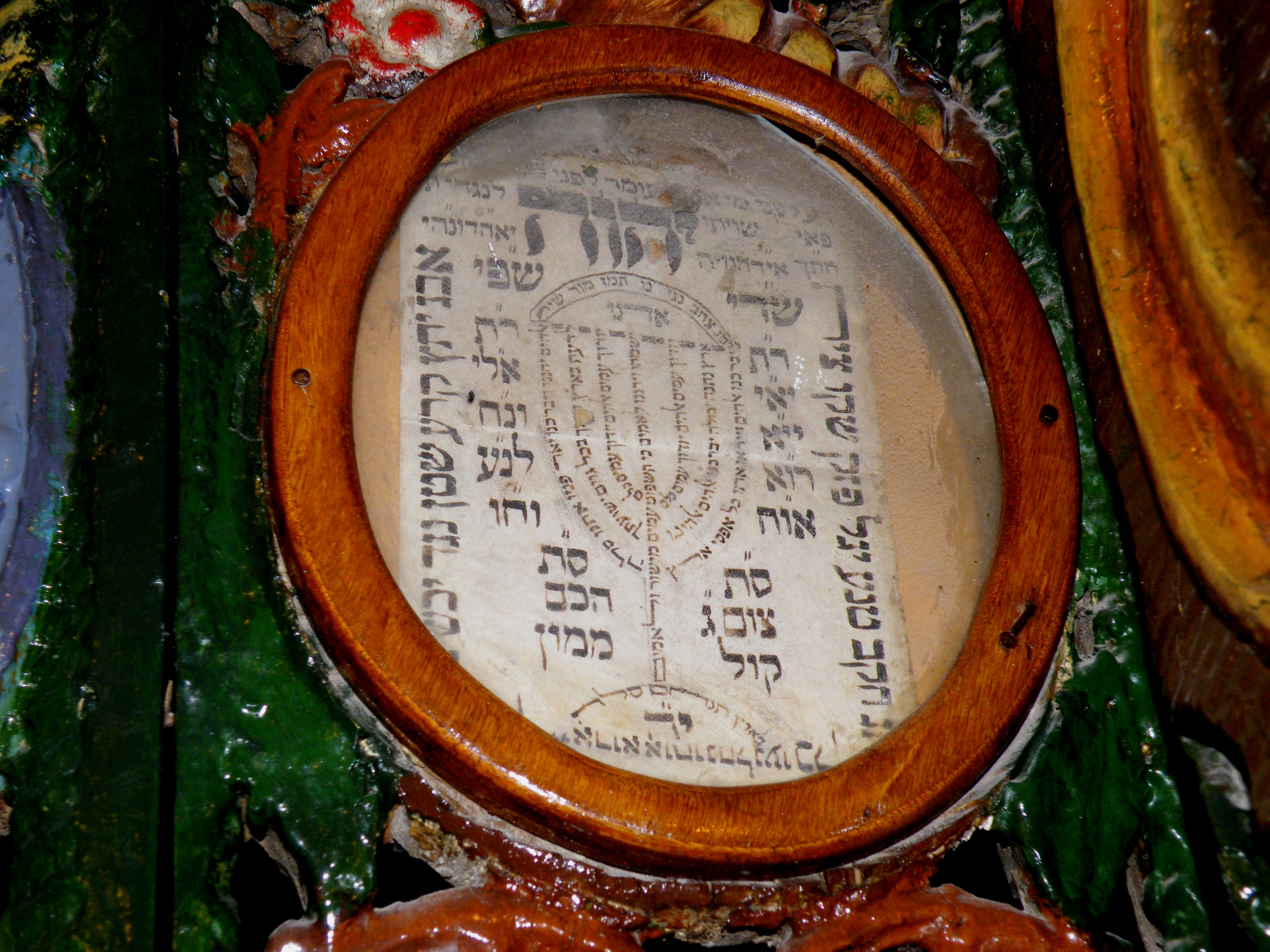
Meditative Kabbalah Shiviti with Kabbalistic names of God

Jewish meditation includes practices of settling the mind, introspection, visualization, emotional insight, contemplation of divine names, or concentration on philosophical, ethical or mystical ideas. Meditation may accompany unstructured, personal Jewish prayer, may be part of structured Jewish services, or may be separate from prayer practices. Jewish mystics have viewed meditation as leading to devekut (cleaving to God). Hebrew terms for meditation include hitbodedut (or hisbodedus, literally "self-seclusion") or hitbonenut/hisbonenus ("contemplation").

Through the centuries, meditation practices have been developed in many movements, including among Maimonideans (Moses Maimonides and Abraham Maimonides), Kabbalists (Abraham Abulafia, Isaac the Blind, Azriel of Gerona, Moses Cordovero, Yosef Karo and Isaac Luria), Hasidic rabbis (Baal Shem Tov, Schneur Zalman of Liadi and Nachman of Breslov), Musar movement rabbis (Israel Salanter and Simcha Zissel Ziv), Conservative movement rabbis (Alan Lew), Reform movement rabbis (Lawrence Kushner and Rami Shapiro), and Reconstructionist movement rabbi (Shefa Gold).

== Definitions ==
In his book Meditation and Kabbalah, Rav Aryeh Kaplan suggests that meditation is a practice that is meant to bring spiritual liberation through various methods that can loosen the bond of the physical, allowing the practitioner to reach the transcendental, spiritual realm and attain Ruach HaKodesh (Holy spirit), which he associates with enlightenment.

More recently Tomer Persico presented the lack of a proper definition of the word meditation. He suggests that the word has many different meanings and uses, and that only a few attempts have been made to provide a comprehensive definition. He therefore suggests meditation should be defined as "A voluntary act aiming to generate an alteration in the individuals consciousness, which they perceive as therapeutic or redemptive". Based on that definition, he further presents a five elements typology with which the various Jewish meditative traditions could be distinguishable from one another:

- Fundamental Structure- Whether the meditation in general cultivates awareness, concentration or automation.
- Orientation, or Intentional Stance- Whether the meditation is inward or outward bent, introverted or extroverted.
- The Emotive Effect- Whether the meditation brings about an enraptured surge of feelings and sense impressions or an equilibrious quieting of the mind, whether it is ecstatic or enstatic.
- The Corporal Locus- Whether it is focused on the mind-consciousness domain, or on the body-emotional arena, whether it is mind and "awareness"-centered or body and "energy"-centered,
- Relationship with the Acknowledged Tradition- Whether the methods are superimposed on the traditional religious practices or whether they are complete innovations being added to them, whether (in the Jewish case specifically) they are nomian or anomian.

== History ==
=== In the Hebrew Bible ===
Aryeh Kaplan sees indications throughout the Hebrew Bible that Judaism always contained a central meditative tradition, going back to the time of the patriarchs. For instance, in the book of Genesis, the patriarch Isaac is described as going "lasuach" (Hebrew: לָשׂוּחַ, romanized: lāśūaḥ, lit. 'to meditate') in the field (Genesis 24:63), understood by many commentators to refer to some type of meditative practice.

Most of the Hebrew Bible references to meditation appear in the book of psalms. It is also mentioned in the first chapter of Joshua.

=== Antiquity ===
Some scholars see Merkavah-Heichalot mysticism as using meditative methods, built around the biblical vision of Ezekiel and the creation in Genesis. According to Michael D. Swartz: "the texts do not, however, provide any instructions for meditation techniques. Nor do they betray any evidence of consciousness of an interior self, such as the soul or mind, which accomplishes the journey to heaven."

=== Medieval era ===
Moses Maimonides, often considered the greatest Jewish philosopher of his time, suggests in The Guide for the Perplexed (3.32), that intellectual meditation is a higher form of worship than either sacrifice or prayer.

He later (3:51) teaches that those who are "perfect" in their intellectual perception of God can "enjoy the presence of Divine Providence", but only while they "meditate on God". He offers a parable that suggests that purely intellectual, private meditation is the highest form of worship.

That chapter of the Guide (3:51) is dedicated to what Maimonides refers to as: "the worship peculiar to those who have apprehended the true realities". According to Maimonides, after acquiring the knowledge of the Divine, we should turn our awareness to Him, something that is usually accomplished in self-seclusion:

It has thus been shown that it must be man's aim, after having acquired the knowledge of God, to deliver himself up to Him, and to have his heart constantly filled with longing after Him. He accomplishes this generally by seclusion and retirement. Every pious man should therefore seek retirement and seclusion, and should only in case of necessity associate with others.

This practice includes love and longing for God, a subject Maimonides discusses in length at the beginning of his other great book, The Mishne Torah:

What is the path [to attain] love and fear of Him? When a person contemplates His wondrous and great deeds and creations and appreciates His infinite wisdom that surpasses all comparison, he will immediately love, praise, and glorify [Him], yearning with tremendous desire to know [God's] great name.

Abraham Maimonides, son of Moses Maimonides, also recommended private meditative practices that were designed to rid the mind of desires and allow for communion with God. Although scholars tend to perceive it as a Sufi inspired Jewish meditation, Maimoni himself testify that this practice was historically used by pious Jews and the Biblical prophets before them, while implying the Sufis were the ones to be inspired by the Jewish tradition. In his book, The Guide to Serving God, the chapter on Hitbodedut provides an elaborative meditative practice based on his father's teachings:

"Inward retreat (Hitbodedut) is the complete focus of the heart.. to empty the heart and mind of all besides God and to fill and occupy them with Him. This is accomplished by totally or partially quieting the sensitive soul, detaching the appetitive (i.e. desiring) soul from the rest of one's worldly occupations and reorienting it toward God; filling the rational soul with God; and using the imaginative soul to assist the intelligence in its contemplation of Gods magnificent creations, which testify to their Creator: the majesty and awe of the sea, with its wondrous creatures, the rotation of the great celestial sphere, the nature of the stars, and such."

=== Kabbalah ===
Kabbalists of different schools have been concerned with a range of esoteric encounters with divinity mediated by different meditative practices, ranging from ecstatic mystical cleaving to God, or prophetic visual and auditory disclosing of the divine, to theurgic manipulation of theosophical divine emanations. Practices included meditation on the names of God in Judaism, combinations of Hebrew letters, and kavanot (esoteric "intentions").

The main concern of the Theosophical Kabbalah such as the Zohar and Isaac Luria was on theurgic harmonisation of the sephirot (Divine attributes), though recent phenomenological scholarship has uncovered the prophetic visualisation of the sephirot as a Divine Anthropos in the imagination of the medieval theosophical practitioners. In contrast, the main concern of the medieval Ecstatic Kabbalah, exemplified most fully in Abraham Abulafia's "Prophetic Kabbalah", was on unio mystica and drawing down the influx of prophecy upon the practitioner. Abulafia opposed interpreting the sephirot as theosophical-theurgical hypostases, seeing them in Maimonidean negative theology psychological terms, while viewing his meditation mysticism as a superior Kabbalah. The ethic of meditation mysticism in Abulafia and other Ecstatic Kabbalists was a minority tradition to the Theosophical Kabbalah mainstream, but later aspects of it became incorporated in the 16th century Theosophical compendiums of Cordovero and Vital, such as drawing down divine influx, and subsequently influenced the psychologisation of Kabbalah in Hasidic self-absorption in God. Ecstatic traditions were at a disadvantage for normative Judaism, as they made classic meditation their central preoccupation; as with Moses Maimonides the mitzvot (Jewish observances) were a means to the end purpose of mystical or philosophical cleaving to God (or the Active intellect). In contrast, Theosophical traditions centred around the theurgic power and cosmic centrality importance of normative Jewish worship and Halakha observance, especially when carried out with elite Kavanot (mystical intentions).

Pinchas Giller questions the usage of the term "meditation" for Theosophical (mainstream) Kabbalah's theurgic kavanot (intentions), where deveikut (cleaving to God) was secondary, preferring the term more accurately for Ecstatic Kabbalah's unio mystica methods and goal. He sees generalising the term in reference to all Kabbalistic intentions as a reflection of the contemporary zeitgeist, promoted by Aryeh Kaplan and others. He recommends Ecstatic Kabbalah, the Jewish Sufism of Abraham Maimonides, or Chabad Hasidic prayer contemplation as paths more suited to develop a future ethic of Jewish meditation (unio mystica). However, as mitzvot are the primary centre of traditional Judaism, Giller sees Jewish prayer, rather than classic meditation akin to Eastern Religions, as the true central expression of Judaism. Theosophical Kabbalists and later Hasidism were deeply concerned to develop mystical approaches to prayer, whether theurgic in the case of Kabbalah, or devotional and self-nullifying in the case of Hasidism.

In contrast to rationalist Jewish philosophy's progressively anti-metaphysical interpretation of Jewish observance, Theosophical Kabbalists reinterpreted Judaism's prayer and mitzvot as cosmic metaphysical processes, especially when carried out in particular ways that could channel the mystical flow between the Divine sephirot on high and from the divine realm to this world. They reinterpreted standard Jewish liturgy by reading it as esoteric mystical meditations and the ascent of the soul for elite practitioners. Through this, the border between supplicatory prayer and theurgic practice blurs if prayer becomes viewed as a magical process rather than Divine response to petitions. However, Kabbalists censored directly magical Practical Kabbalah willed control of angels for only the most holy, and justified their theurgic prayer as optimising the divine channels through which their prayerful supplication to God ascends. Kabbalists declare one prayers only "to Him (God's essence, "male" here solely in Hebrew's gendered grammar), not to His attributes (sephirot)". To pray to a Divine attribute introduces the cardinal idolatrous sin of division and plurality among the sephirot, separating them from their dependence and nullification in the Absolute Ein Sof Unity. Instead, Kabbalist prayer, following the liturgy, is only to God ("Blessed are You, Lord our God" - the Divine Essence expressed though different Names of God in Judaism). However, each traditional Name of God corresponds in Kabbalah to a different manifestation of the sephirot. Moses Cordovero, who systemised Kabbalah, explains that the sephirot names (Keter, Chokmah, Binah, etc.) are the vessels of each attribute; to pray to the vessel is idolatry. The corresponding Names of God (Eheye, Yah, Havayah, etc) relate to the inner Divine Unity dimension of each sephira, expressing the forms the unified Infinite light takes as it illuminates within each vessel; prayer to traditional liturgy Divine Names is prayer to God's Essence, expressed through particular sephirot supernal channels on high. Corresponding with the traditional words of prayer, the Kabbalist intentionally contemplates each Divine Name sephirot channel with theurgic Kavanot meditations to open the Divine flow so prayer supplication to God's hidden innermost Will (concealed within the innermost dimensions of the first sephirah Keter, where it merges into the Ein Sof) is optimised, as the traditional prayer relates, "May it be Your Will that... your Kindness overrides Judgment" etc.

Aryeh Kaplan described what he termed "meditative kabbalah", shared across academic divisions between Theosophical and Ecstatic Kabbalists, as a midpoint on the spectrum between "practical kabbalah" and "theoretical kabbalah".

==== Ecstatic Kabbalists ====
===== Abraham Abulafia =====
Abraham Abulafia (1240–1291), a leading medieval figure in the history of Meditative Kabbalah and the founder of the school of Prophetic/Ecstatic Kabbalah, wrote meditation manuals using meditation on Hebrew letters and words to achieve ecstatic states.

His teachings embody the non-Zoharic stream in Spanish Kabbalism, which he viewed as alternative and superior to the theosophical Kabbalah which he criticised. Abulafia's work was surrounded in controversy because of the edict against him by Shlomo ben Aderet, a contemporary leading scholar. However, according to Aryeh Kaplan, the Abulafian system of meditations forms an important part of the work of Hayim Vital, and in turn his master Isaac Luria.

Aryeh Kaplan's pioneering translations and scholarship on Meditative Kabbalah trace Abulafia's publications to the extant concealed transmission of the esoteric meditative methods of the Hebrew prophets.

While Abulafia remained a marginal figure in the direct development of Theosophical Kabbalah, recent academic scholarship on Abulafia by Moshe Idel reveals his wider influence across the later development of Jewish mysticism.

In the 16th century Judah Albotini continued Abulafian methods in Jerusalem.

===== Isaac of Acco =====
Isaac ben Samuel of Acre (1250–1340) also wrote about meditative techniques. One of Isaac's most important teachings involves developing hishtavut, which Aryeh Kaplan describes as equanimity, stoicism, and a total indifference to outside influences. Rabbi Isaac sees hishtavut as a prerequisite for meditation:

You should constantly keep the letters of the Unique Name in your mind as if they were in front of you, written in a book with Torah (Ashurit) script. Each letter should appear infinitely large.

When you depict the letters of the Unique Name (י-ה-ו-ה) in this manner, your mind's eye should gaze on them, and at the same time, your heart should be directed toward the Infinite Being (Ain Sof). Your gazing and thought should be as one.

This is the mystery of true attachment, regarding which the Torah says, "To Him you shall attach yourself" (Deuteronomy 10:20).

===== Joseph Tzayach =====
Joseph Tzayach (1505–1573), influenced by Abulafia, taught his own system of meditation. Tzayach was probably the last Kabbalist to advocate use of the prophetic position, where one places his head between his knees. This position was used by Elijah on Mount Carmel, and in early Merkabah mysticism. Speaking of individuals who meditate (hitboded), he says:

They bend themselves like reeds, placing their heads between their knees until all their faculties are nullified. As a result of this lack of sensation, they see the Supernal Light, with true vision and not with allegory.

==== Theosophical Kabbalists ====
===== Moses ben Jacob Cordovero =====
Moses ben Jacob Cordovero (1522–1570) taught that when meditating, one does not focus on the Sefirot (divine emanations) per se, but rather on the light from the Infinite (Atzmus-essence of God) contained within the emanations. Keeping in mind that all reaches up to the Infinite, his prayer is "to Him, not to His attributes." Proper meditation focuses upon how the Godhead acts through specific sefirot. In meditation on the essential Hebrew name of God, represented by the four letter Tetragrammaton, this corresponds to meditating on the Hebrew vowels which are seen as reflecting the light from the Infinite-Atzmus.

===== Isaac Luria =====
Isaac Luria (1534–1572), the father of modern Kabbalah, systemised Lurianic Kabbalistic theory as a dynamic mythological scheme. While the Zohar is outwardly solely a theosophical work, for which reason medieval Meditative Kabbalists followed alternative traditions, Luria's systemisation of doctrine enabled him to draw new detailed meditative practices, called Yichudim, from the Zohar, based on the dynamic interaction of the Lurianic partzufim. This meditative method, as with Luria's theosophical exegesis, dominated later Kabbalistic activity. Luria prescribed Yichudim as Kavanot for the prayer liturgy, later practiced communally by Shalom Sharabi and the Beit El circle, for Jewish observances, and for secluded attainment of Ruach Hakodesh. One favoured activity of the Safed mystics was meditation while prostrated on the graves of saints, in order to commune with their souls.

===== Hayim Vital =====
Haim Vital (c. 1543–1620), major disciple of Isaac Luria, and responsible for publication of most of his works. In Etz Hayim and the Eight Gates he describes the theosophical and meditative teachings of Luria. However, his own writings cover wider meditative methods, drawn from earlier sources. His Shaarei Kedusha (Gates of Holiness) was the only guidebook to Meditative Kabbalah traditionally printed, though its most esoteric fourth part remained unpublished until recently. In the following account Vital presents the method of R. Yosef Karo in receiving his Heavenly Magid teacher, which he regarded as the soul of the Mishna (recorded by Karo in Magid Mesharim):

Meditate alone in a house, wrapped in a prayer shawl. Sit and shut your eyes, and transcend the physical as if your soul has left your body and is ascending to heaven. After this divestment/ascension, recite one Mishna, any Mishna you wish, many times consecutively, as quickly as you can, with clear pronunciation, without skipping one word. Intend to bind your soul with the soul of the sage who taught this Mishna. " Your soul will become a chariot. .."

Do this by intending that your mouth is a mere vessel/conduit to bring forth the letters of the words of this Mishna, and that the voice that emerges through the vessel of your mouth is [filled with] the sparks of your inner soul which are emerging and reciting this Mishna. In this way, your soul will become a chariot within which the soul of the sage who is the master of that Mishna can manifest. His soul will then clothe itself within your soul.

At a certain point in the process of reciting the words of the Mishna, you may feel overcome by exhaustion. If you are worthy, the soul of this sage may then come to reside in your mouth. This will happen in the midst of your reciting the Mishna. As you recite, he will begin to speak with your mouth and wish you Shalom. He will then answer every question that comes into your thoughts to ask him. He will do this with and through your mouth. Your ears will hear his words, for you will not be speaking from yourself. Rather, he will be speaking through you. This is the mystery of the verse, "The spirit of God spoke to me, and His word was on my lips". (Samuel II 23:2)

== In modern Jewish movements ==
=== Hasidic Judaism ===
==== The Baal Shem Tov ====
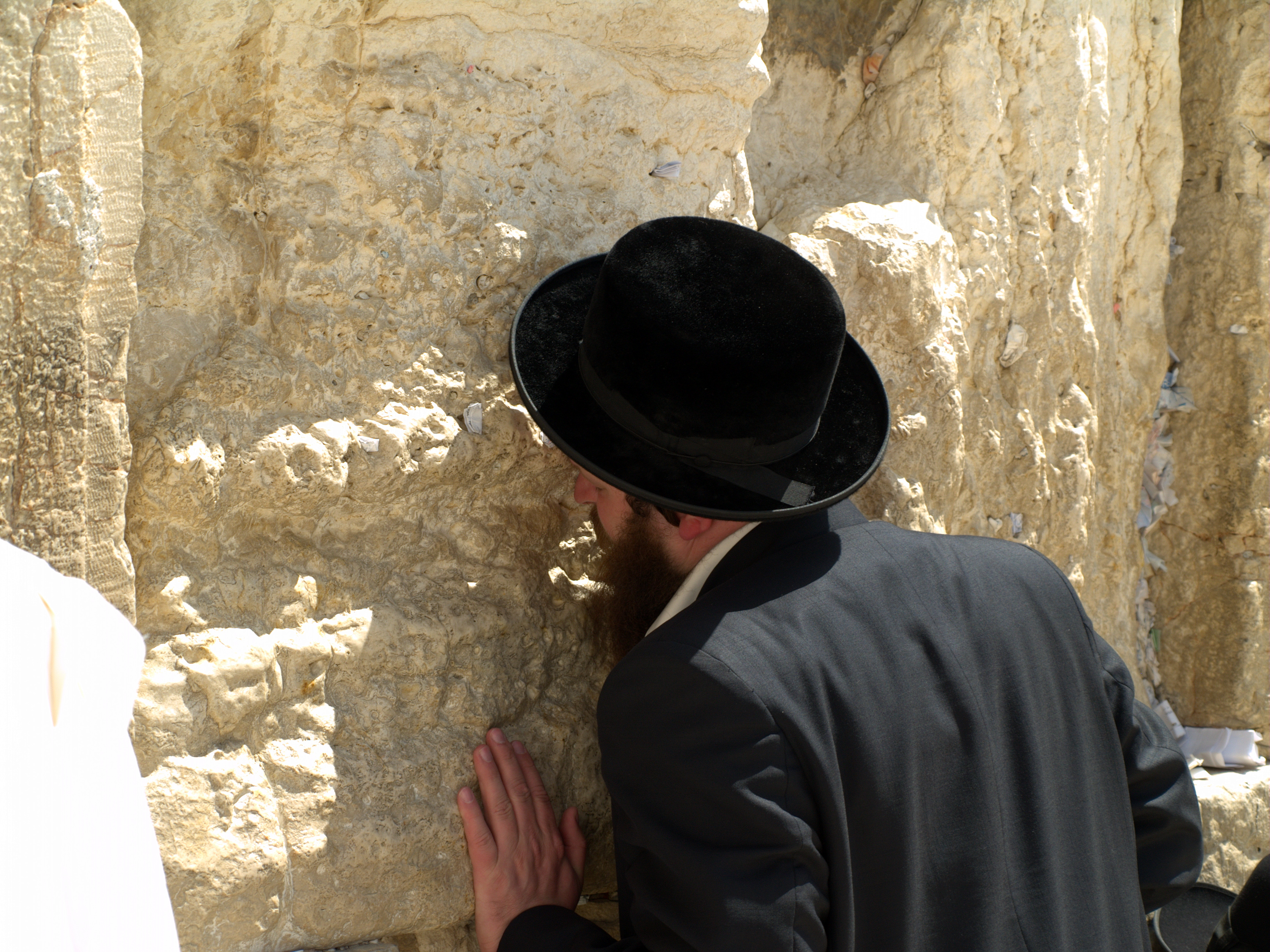
Hasidic prayer often emphasizes emotional dveikut (cleaving to God), especially through attachment to the Tzaddik.

The Baal Shem Tov, founder of Hasidism, took the Talmudic phrase that "God desires the heart" and made it central to his love of the sincerity of the common folk. Advocating joy in the omnipresent divine immanence, he encouraged emotional devekut (fervour), especially through attachment to the Hasidic figure of the Tzaddik. He also encouraged his close disciples to find devekut through seclusion (hisbodedus) from others and by meditating on select kabbalistic unifications (yichudim) of Yitzchak Luria. As Hasidism developed and became a popular revival movement, use of esoteric Kabbalistic Kavanot (intentions) on Divine names was seen as an impediment to direct emotional Devekut (cleaving to God), and was dropped in favour of new meditative and contemplative practices of Divine consciousness. This downplaying of the theurgic role of Theosophical Kabbalah, the psychologisation of Kabbalistic symbolism, and emphasis on Divine Omnipresence, began with the Baal Shem Tov. In a parable he related that knowing each of the detailed Kabbalistic Kavanot in prayer unlocked individual gates in Heaven, but tears break through all barriers to reach the King Himself.

==== Chabad Hasidism ====
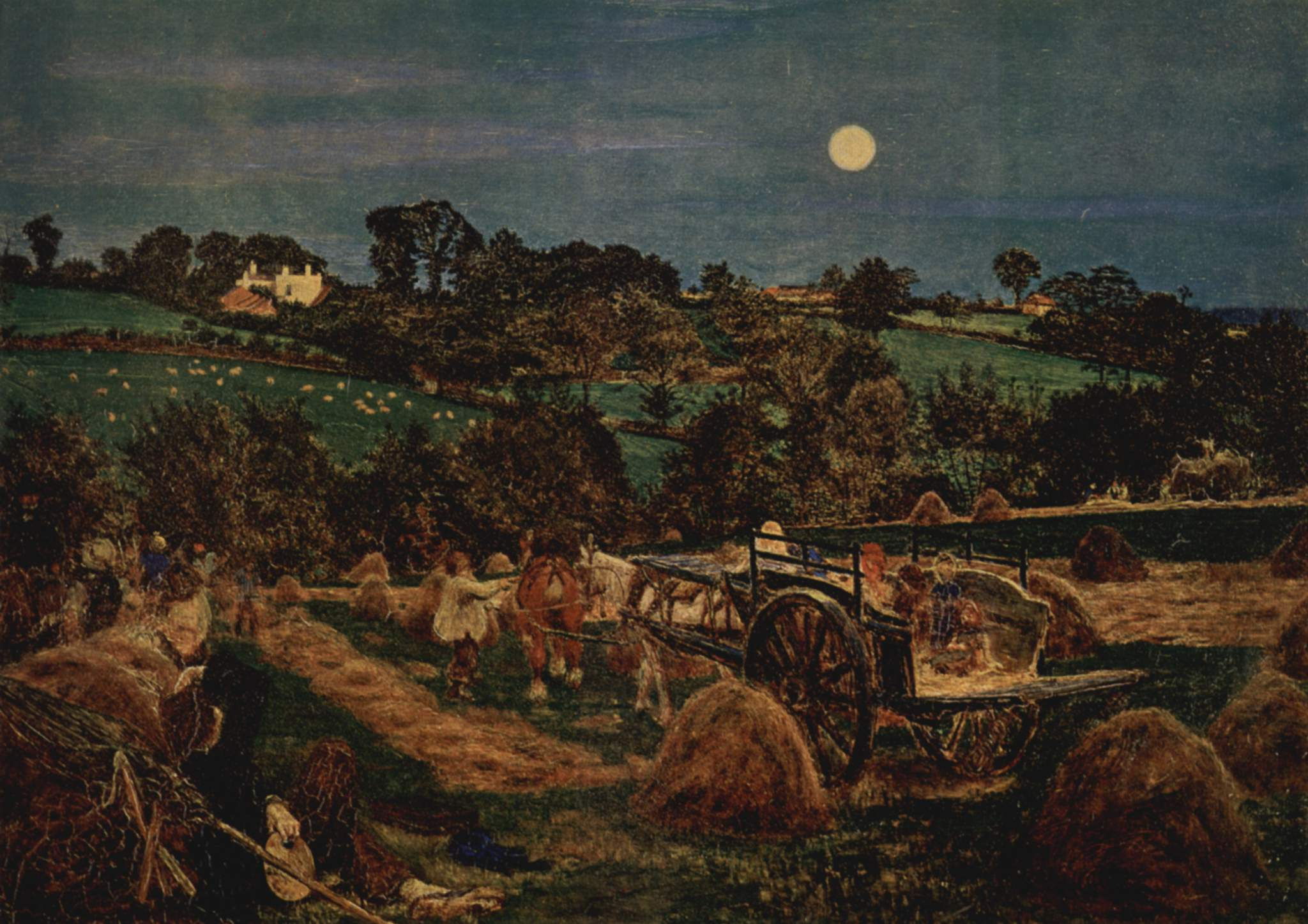
Breslov Hasidim spend time in secluded communication of their heart to God. In Jewish communities they often seek this solitude in Nature at night.

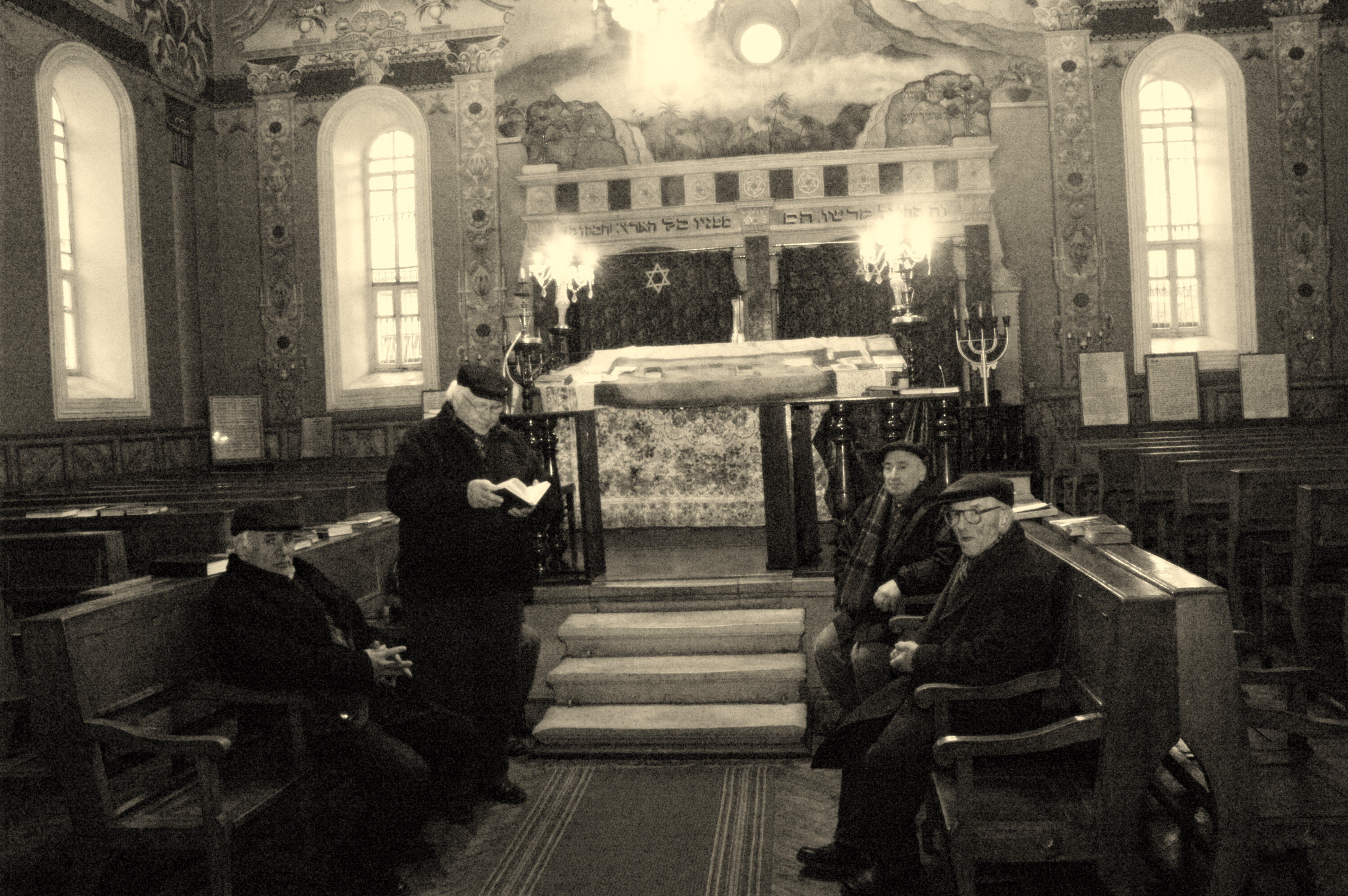
Chabad differed from mainstream Hasidism in its preparation for prayer by intellectual contemplation of Hasidic philosophy.

Dovber Schneuri, the second leader of the Chabad Dynasty, wrote several works explaining the Chabad approach. In his works, he explains that the Hebrew word for meditation is hisbonenus (alternatively transliterated as hitbonenut). The word hisbonenut derives from the Hebrew word Binah (lit. understanding) and refers to the process of understanding through analytical study. While the word hisbonenus can be applied to analytical study of any topic, it is generally used to refer to study of the Torah, and particularly in this context, the explanations of Kabbalah in Chabad Hasidic philosophy, in order to achieve a greater understanding and appreciation of God.

In the Chabad presentation, every intellectual process must incorporate three faculties: Chochma, Binah, and Daat. Chochma (lit. wisdom) is the mind's ability to come up with a new insight into a concept that one did not know before. Binah (lit. understanding) is the mind's ability to take a new insight (from Chochma), analyze all of its implications and simplify the concept so it is understood well. Daat (lit. knowledge), the third stage, is the mind's ability to focus and hold its attention on the Chochma and the Binah.

The term hisbonenus represents an important point of the Chabad method: Chabad Hasidic philosophy rejects the notion that any new insight can come from mere concentration. Chabad philosophy explains that while Daat is a necessary component of cognition, it is like an empty vessel without the learning and analysis and study that comes through the faculty of Binah. Just as a scientist's new insight or discovery (Chochma) always results from prior in-depth study and analysis of his topic (Binah), likewise, to gain any insight in godliness can only come through in-depth study of the explanations of Kabbalah and Hasidic philosophy. In this view, enlightenment is commensurate with one's understanding of the Torah and specifically the explanations of Kabbalah and Hasidic philosophy. Prolonged concentration devoid of intellectual content, or hallucinations of the imagination, should not be mistaken for spiritual enlightenment.

Chabad accepts and endorses the writings of Kabbalists such as Moses Cordovero and Haim Vital and their works are quoted at length in the Hasidic texts. However, the Chabad masters say that their methods are easily misunderstood without a proper foundation in Hasidic philosophy.

==== Breslav Hasidism ====
Rebbe Nachman of Breslov used the term hisbodedus (alternatively transliterated as hitbodedut, from the root "boded" meaning "self-seclusion") to refer to an unstructured, spontaneous and individualized form of prayer and meditation. It may involve speaking to God in one's own words, although Rebbe Nachman teaches that if one does not know what to say, one should repeat the words "Ribbono Shel Olam," which will create a heightened state of awareness. The goals of hitbodedut may include establishing a close, personal relationship with God and a clearer understanding of one's personal motives and goals or (as in Likutey Moharan I, Lesson 52) the transformative realization of God as the "Imperative Existent," or Essence of Reality.

=== The Musar Movement ===
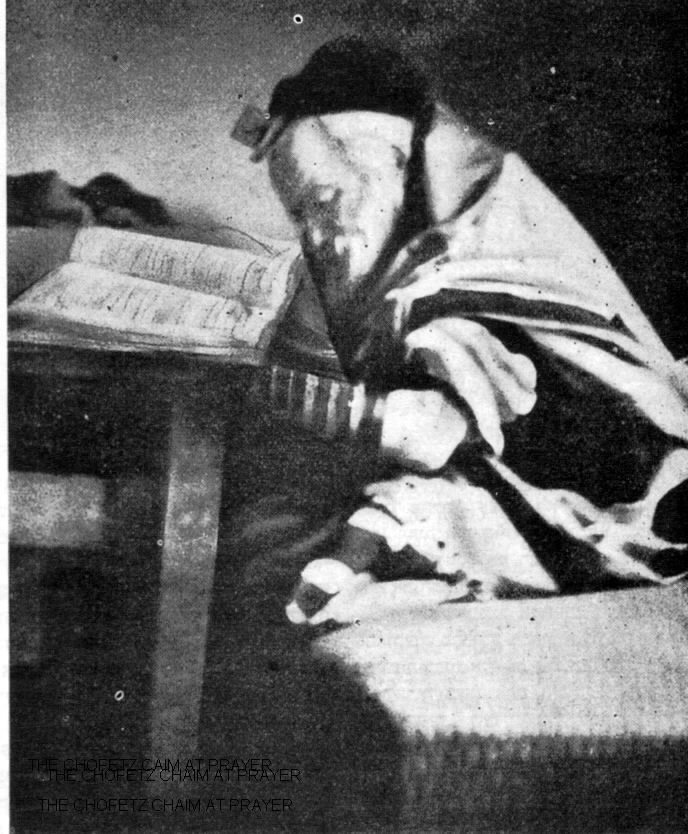
Rabbi Yisrael Meir HaCohen Kagan at prayer

The Musar (ethics) movement, founded by Rabbi Israel Salanter in the middle of the 19th century, encouraged meditative practices of introspection and visualization that could help to improve moral character. Focusing on the truthful psychological self-evaluation of one's spiritual worship, the Musar movement institutionalized the classic musar literature tradition as a spiritual movement within the Lithuanian Yeshiva academies. Many meditation techniques were described in the writings of Salanter's closest disciple, Rabbi Simcha Zissel Ziv.

According to Geoffrey Claussen of Elon University, some forms of Musar meditation are visualization techniques which "seek to make impressions upon one's character—often a matter of taking insights of which we are conscious and bringing them into our unconscious." Other forms of Musar meditation are introspective, "considering one's character and exploring its tendencies—often a matter of taking what is unconscious and bringing it to consciousness." A number of contemporary rabbis have advocated such practices, including "taking time each day to sit in silence and simply noticing the way that one's mind wanders." Alan Morinis, the founder of the Mussar Institute, recommends morning meditation practices that can be as short as four minutes. One of the meditations especially recommended by Morinis is the practice of focusing on a single word: the Hebrew word Sh'ma, meaning "listen."

=== Orthodox Judaism ===
Recent Orthodox Judaism teachers of Jewish mystical meditation methods include Aryeh Kaplan and Yitzchak Ginsburgh. Kaplan especially, published scholarly and popular books that reinterpreted and revived historic Jewish mystical contemplation techniques in terms of the late 20th century zeitgeist for meditation.

=== Conservative Judaism ===
Conservative Rabbi Alan Lew has been credited with teaching Jewish meditation to thousands of people. His synagogue Congregation Beth Sholom in San Francisco, California, includes a meditation center, the first meditation center connected to a Conservative synagogue. By 1997, Lew noted that almost all of the largest Conservative synagogues in northern California had regular meditation groups. Conservative rabbi Geoffrey Claussen has encouraged Conservative Judaism to adopt meditation practices from the Musar movement. Conservative synagogues that promote meditation practices in the 21st century sometimes describe these practices as helping people to create space in their lives to be present.

=== Reconstructionist Judaism ===
Reconstructionist rabbis such as Sheila Peltz Weinberg and Shefa Gold have been noted for their Jewish meditation teachings.

=== Reform Judaism ===
Meditation activities have become increasingly common at Reform synagogues in the twenty-first century. Rabbis Lawrence Kushner and Rami Shapiro are among the Reform rabbis who encourage Jewish meditation practices.

== See also ==
- Fear of God (religion)
- Jewish views on love
- Love of God
- Nigun
- Ohr
- Teshuvah
- Tzedakah
