= Hitbodedut =

Unstructured, spontaneous and individualized form of prayer and meditation

Hitbodedut or hisbodedus (Hebrew: הִתְבּוֹדְדוּת, lit. "seclusion, solitariness, solitude"; Tiberian: hiṯbōḏăḏūṯ [hiθboːðaˈðuːuθ], Ashkenazi Hebrew hisboydedus, Sephardi Hebrew hitbodedut) refers to practices of self-secluded Jewish meditation. The term was popularized by Nachman of Breslov (1772–1810) to refer to an unstructured, spontaneous, and individualized form of prayer and meditation through which one would establish a close, personal relationship with God and ultimately see the Divinity inherent in all being.

== Background ==
According to some scholars, within the school of ecstatic Kabbalah, hitbodedut should be understood as "concentrated thought as part of a clearly defined mystical technique". This is demonstrated in the teachings of Kabbalists such as Abraham Aboulafia, Isaac of Acre, Moses Cordovero, Elazar Azkiri, Eliyahu De Vidas, and Hayyim Vital, also suggesting that this practice may have influenced later Jewish mystics, including Hasidic masters.

Later research focused on hitbodedut as practiced in the Breslov tradition, distinguishing it from earlier mystics' hitbodedut, which often denotes mental concentration. Instead, Breslov hitbodedut is understood as either its literal meaning—physical self-seclusion—or as candid conversation with God. In some instances, Rabbi Nachman emphasizes that seclusion and frank talks with God are intended to bring about potent mystical experiences, which is viewed as the ideal culmination of Breslov hitbodedut. It is believed that this tradition has been adapted to modern spiritual needs, shifting from solitary communication with God to a focus on personal well-being, emotional healing, and self-exploration.

Recent research challenges earlier scholars and the distinction between hitbodedut in ecstatic Kabbalah, Breslov hitbodedut, and other hitbodedut teachings. Instead it suggests that the earliest hitbodedut guide was written by Abraham son of Moses Maimonides (1186–1237), leader of the Pietists of Egypt, proposing that hitbodedut should be understood as “a meditative practice comprising three key elements—withdrawal from physical stimuli, directing awareness toward the Divine, and applying focused concentration to cleave to God and potentially attain divine inspiration.” It is suggested that hitbodedut was transmitted to the 13th century Kabbalists of Acre, the 16th-century Kabbalists of Safed, and eventually to later 18th-century Kabbalists such as Moses Hayyim Luzato, as well as Hasidic masters such as Rabbi Nachman of Breslov. The inclusion of Breslov hitbodedut under this definition is said to be based on a rare citation of Rabbi Nachman’s own words on hitbodedut at the end of Likutei Moharan 52, which does not include conversing with God.

== Hitbodedut in the Teachings of Abraham Maimonides ==
Among the earliest documented evidence to the use of hitbodedut as a spiritual practice can be found in the teachings of the Jewish pietistic movement in Egypt. In these teachings, depending on the context, hitbodedut can mean one of three things: "either spiritual retreat to a secluded place... the meditational technique practiced during such a retreat... the psychological state resulting therefrom, i.e. oblivion to the sensual world."

In his most important work, Kitab Kifayat al-Abidin (The Guide for Serving God), Abraham Maimonides suggests a special spiritual path for the Hasid (pious), the one who wishes to have a closer, more intimate worship of God. The chapter in the Kifayat on Hitbodedut begins by identifying it as a practice used by the prophets and the pious, stating that “Hitbodedut is an ideal path to intimacy with God. It is the way of the greatest Hasidim, and through it, the prophets achieved Encounter with God.” He then goes to describe the nature of the practice and provides a typology of Hitbodedut, distinguishing between “outward” and “inward” practices:

“There is outward Hitbodedut, and there is inward Hitbodedut. The purpose of outward Hitbodedut is to realize inward Hitbodedut, which is the highest rung in the ladder toward Encounter, and is [a degree of] Encounter itself. Inward Hitbodedut is the complete focus of the heart… [This requires one] to empty the heart and mind of all besides God and to fill and occupy them with Him.”

It is suggested there are two forms of Hitbodedut, ‘outward’, which involves physical seclusion to eliminate distractions and quiet the senses, and ‘inward’, which involves two key elements: directing one's awareness ("heart and mind") away from worldly concerns ("all besides God") and focusing completely on God ("fill and occupy them with Him"). The physical aspect, seclusion, serves as means for the inner practice, which seeks to deepen Devekut (attachment to God) until the self merges with the Divine, ultimately leading to an encounter with God. Maimoni also provides practical instructions for Hitbodedut:

“Totally or partially quiet the sensitive soul; detach the appetitive (desiring) soul from worldly occupations and reorient it toward God; fill the rational soul with God; and [finally,] use the imaginative soul to assist the intelligence in contemplating God’s magnificent creations, which testify to their Creator.”

Based on these instructions, some scholars suggest defining Hitbodedut as a meditation technique that consists of three core elements: withdrawal from physical stimuli, focusing awareness on the Divine, and applying concentrated attention to achieve closeness to God and, potentially, Divine inspiration.

== Rebbe Nachman's Method ==
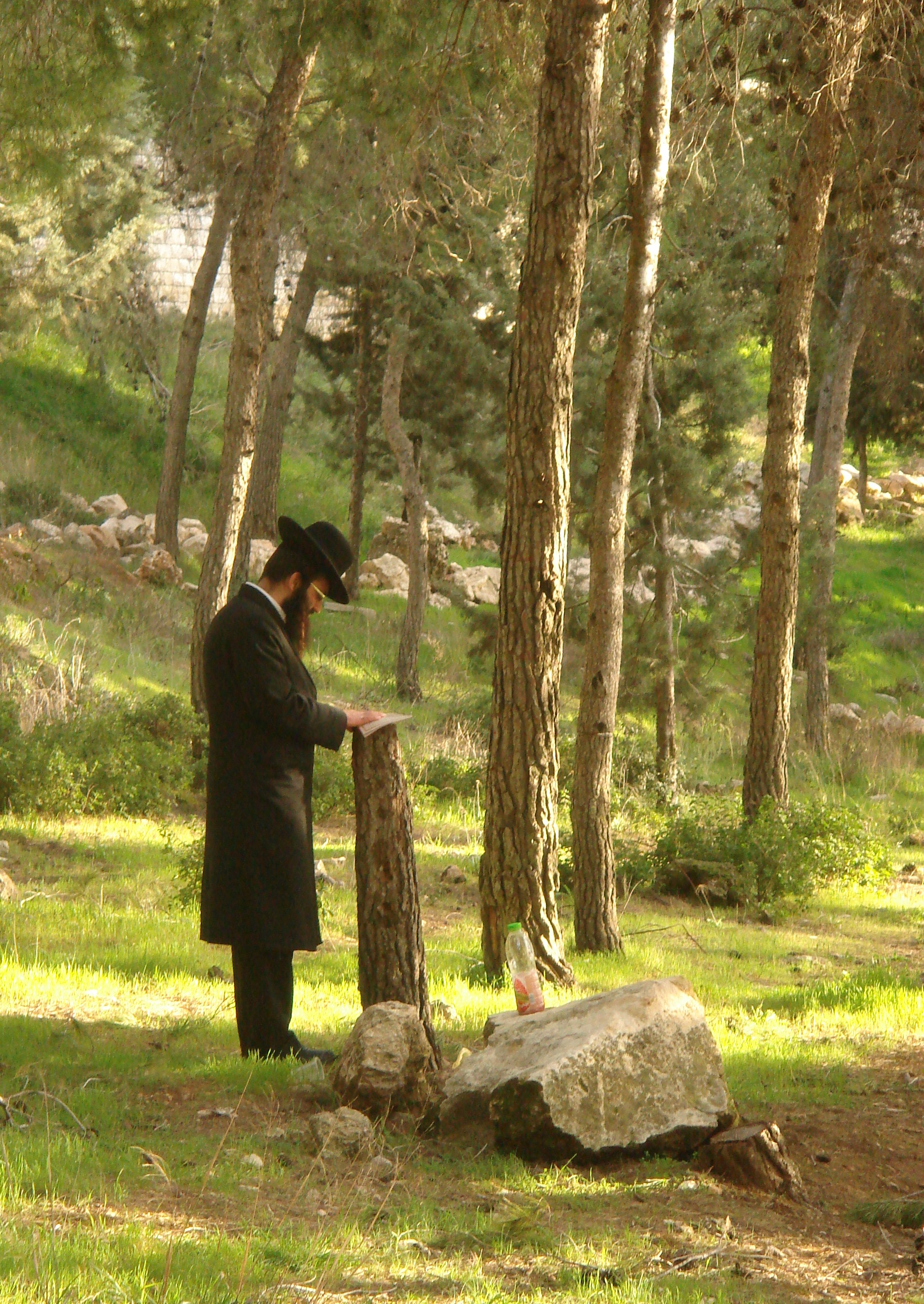
Breslover Hasid practicing hitbodedut in the Jerusalem Forest. Hitbodedut can be performed indoors or amidst nature, and alternatively at night.

The method involves talking to God in an intimate, informal manner while secluded in a private setting such as a closed room or a private outdoor setting.

The Rebbe Nachman of Breslov used to teach that one should spend a lot of time in solitude every day: during these moments, which would later turn into semi-prophetic or ecstatic experiences for the knowledge of God and the truth of the Torah, the devout Jew has more opportunities for Teshuvah, due to innovations in the knowledge of the Torah itself, in addition to being a specific meditative modality for personal prayers and being able to trust God as you would with a friend. (Note: Even though I left the inn in a hurry and knew I couldn't walk to the horse-drawn carriage, I kept chasing the Rebbe's chariot. I reasoned thinking that maybe God would somehow allow me to get there. And that's what happened. I ran behind the carriage for a while. Then the vehicle slowed, first over a cliff, then over a bridge where one of the Rebbe's Chassid had been waiting for him. This man knew that the Rebbe would not speak to him at the inn and he still wanted to see him. So he decided to go ahead and wait for the Rebbe on the bridge that he had to cross on his way. Then I came to the Rebbe and stood in front of him. My friend Reb Naftalí had seen me running after the Rebbe and he ran with me, also joining the carriage. There we were three Chassidim, facing the Rebbe. The Rebbe greeted us warmly and asked: "What would you rather... give you a blessing or say a little of the Torah for you?" I knew that if we did not listen to the Torah at that time, we would lose the opportunity to hear it fully: "You will give us the blessing, God willing, when you get home. Now tell us about the Torah!" The Rebbe told us: "I will explain why I am traveling..." The Rebbe revealed to us one of the secrets of the Tzadik im: each one builds his own Sancta Sanctorum, a concept found in the Torah (Likutey Moharan I, 282) and we had heard the Rebbe speak in Shemini Atzeret. He concluded by saying: "Truly, the Chazan goes where the children (young people, who are learning the Torah) are reading" (Talmud, Shabbat 11a) — Reb Noson, Iemei Moharnat)

Rebbe Nachman taught that the best place for hitbodedut is in the forests or fields. "When a person meditates in the fields, all the grasses join in his prayer and increase its effectiveness and power," he wrote. He also suggested practicing hitbodedut in the middle of the night, when the desires and lusts of this world are at rest, although doing it during the day is just as effective.

During a session of hitbodedut, the practitioner pours out his heart to God in his own language, describing all his thoughts, feelings, problems and frustrations. (Note: Solitude, therefore, as a personal Sancta Sanctorum to rise spiritually, to recover one's inner state despite daily vicissitudes or, more simply, as a respite after the many confrontations in society: in fact, the Rebbe suggested that everyone should immediately dedicate a space of their own home even to distance themselves from their own family and even from their wife: with this, however, he feels that it is sometimes acceptable to interrupt hitbodedut. In any case, as the "sancta sanctorum" of Jerusalem has always constituted for the Jewish people one of the most important issues for their own spiritual subsistence and obvious necessity as a principle of faith for the affirmation of the divine omnipresence, this hitbodedut is, therefore, an essential element of the most rigorous Devekut and the forced need to restore oneself in the soul, in faith and thirst for knowledge and truth) Nothing was viewed by Rebbe Nachman as being too mundane for discussion, including business dealings, conflicting desires and everyday interactions. Even the inability to properly articulate what one wishes to say is viewed as a legitimate subject to discuss with God. One should also use the opportunity to examine his behavior and motivations, correcting the flaws and errors of the past while seeking the proper path for the future.

If one is absolutely unable to speak to God, then Rebbe Nachman advised saying one word with as much strength as possible. He taught that saying that word over and over again will eventually lead to a breakthrough; God will have compassion on the person and they will eventually be able to express themselves.

Rebbe Nachman told his leading disciple, Reb Noson, that hitbodedut should be practiced in a simple, straightforward manner, as if he were conversing with a close friend. He also advised:

"It is very good to pour out your thoughts before God like a child pleading before his father. God calls us His children, as it is written (Deuteronomy 14:1), "You are children to God." Therefore, it is good to express your thoughts and troubles to God like a child complaining and pestering his father."

== Silent meditation ==
Hitbodedut also lends itself to certain silent meditation techniques. One is the "silent scream," which Rebbe Nachman himself practiced. He described the silent scream as follows:

You can shout loudly in a "small still voice"… Anyone can do this. Just imagine the sound of such a scream in your mind. Depict the shout in your imagination exactly as it would sound. Keep this up until you are literally screaming with this soundless "small still voice."

This is actually a scream and not mere imagination. Just as some vessels bring the sound from your lungs to your lips, others bring it to the brain. You can draw the sound through these nerves, literally bringing it into your head. When you do this, you are actually shouting inside your brain.

Another form of hitbodedut is called bitul (nullification), in which the practitioner meditates on God's presence to the exclusion of all other things, including oneself.

Hitbodedut is performed in one's mother tongue, in contrast to most other Jewish prayers that are recited in Hebrew. Rebbe Nachman did not intend for hitbodedut to take the place of the three daily prescribed Jewish services, but to supplement them. He recommended that his followers engage in hitbodedut for at least one hour each day.

Hitbodedut is a staple practice for all Breslover Hasidim. The practice has been much publicized throughout Israel and the Jewish diaspora as a unique form of Jewish meditation, and is practiced by some Jews who are not Breslover Hasidim.

== See also ==
- Breslov (Hasidic dynasty)
- Nachman of Breslov
- Jewish meditation
