= Leo Felton =

Biracial former white supremacist

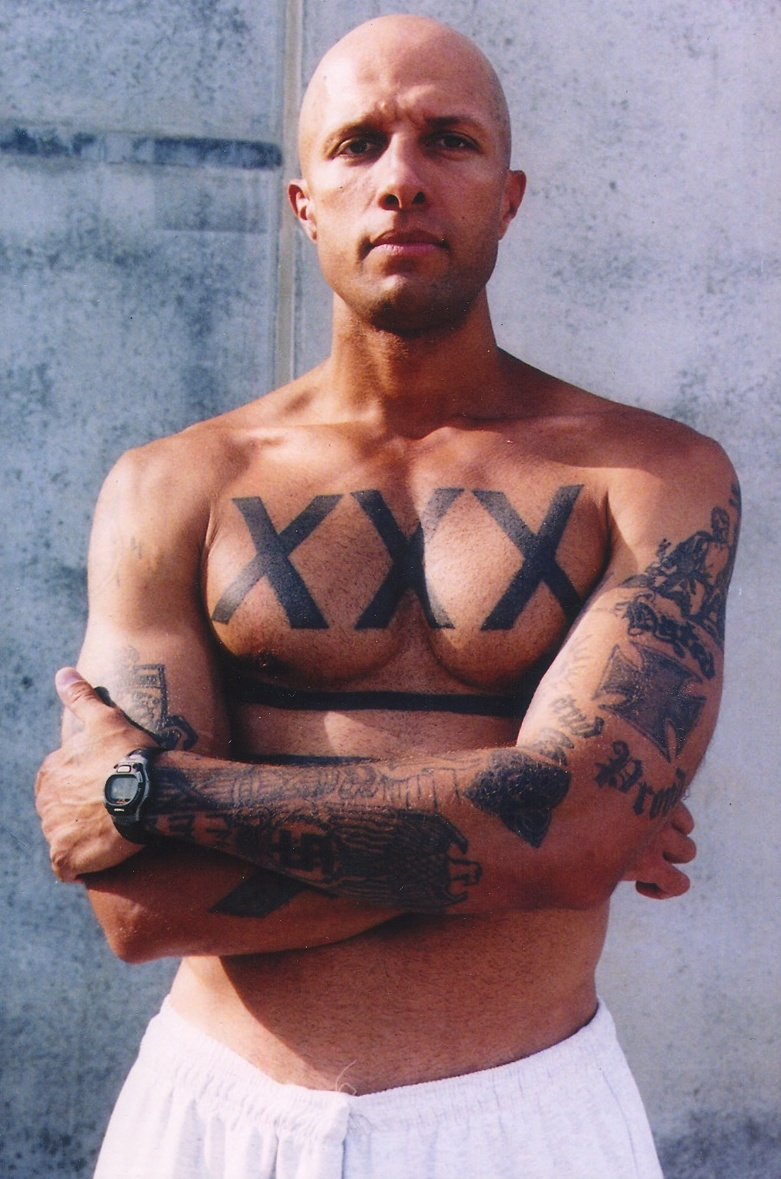
Undated photo of Felton

Leo Vincelette Felton (born 1970) is an American former white supremacist of partial African American descent. In 2002, Felton and his white supremacist girlfriend were convicted of bank robbery and plotting to build a bomb in Boston to attack Jewish and black Americans, colloquially referred to as the 2002 white supremacist terror plot. Felton was released from prison in 2019 after serving 17 years. He later renounced white supremacy.

== Early life ==
Leo Felton was born in 1970. He was the only child of his two parents; his father, Calvin Felton (b. 1930), was a black architect, while his mother, Corinne Vincelette (b. 1931), was a white voice and diction professor, a former nun, who became involved in the civil rights movement. Both of his parents were civil rights activists. His father had a previous failed marriage to a black woman, from which Felton had 7 black half brothers and sisters. His parents divorced when he was two, and he was raised in Gaithersburg, Maryland. His mother later came out as a lesbian and, with Felton, moved in with her girlfriend, who was a feminist author, and her two daughters. All other members of this household were white, and Felton's father was absentee.

He was often teased as a child for his family dynamics and for having an absent father. When Felton was 10 years old, he got in a fight with two other children, one black and one white. The fight escalated; one called Felton a "half breed". In response, Felton attempted to stab him to death, and chased him around the neighborhood. As a result, his mother had him committed to a psychiatric institution, and he spent the next few years of his life in state care and in mental hospitals. Both Felton and his father maintained he did not have mental problems, but his mother repeatedly convinced authorities to keep him institutionalized, from which he exited finally at age 14. He dropped out of high school and was active in the local punk scene.

== White supremacy ==
Felton spent 11 years (1990–2001) in prison for assault during a road rage incident where he attempted to murder a black taxi driver. His prison sentence was extended for attacking two black inmates. In prison, he became a self-described white supremacist, seeing the white inmates as the only people there he could relate to, and an organizer for white supremacist groups. Academic George Michael described him as a "fanatical white supremacist".

Despite the fact he obscured his ancestry, the contradiction between it and his white supremacism initially frustrated him. This changed when he read Francis Parker Yockey's Imperium, a fascist book which advocates a non-biological approach to racism and argues that the notion of race is more spiritual; in a quote singled out by Felton, Yockey wrote that "Race is, in the first instance, what a man feels", and so one could decide to be white by being committed to the white man's "historical Mission". Felton adopted this viewpoint and considered himself white anyway. He justified his white supremacy in this way, despite his ancestry. He continued to hide this from other white supremacists, who he viewed as "materialist" in their racism and unfamiliar with Yockey, and claimed that he was "1/4 English and 3/4 Italian". This largely worked and he was accepted by other white supremacists, networking among neo-Nazis in every prison he transferred to, and creating a system for obtaining recommended reading books for white racist inmates.

=== Terror plot ===
While imprisoned, Felton met Erica Chase, a member of the white supremacist group the World Church of the Creator. They met through the women's program of the WCOTC, the "Sisterhood", which had a Prisoner Support Group element; she struck up a correspondence with him. After his release they met and began dating. Felton robbed a bank with a friend from prison and forged money in order to buy materials to create a fertilizer bomb. They aimed to target Jewish and black facilities in the Boston area to ignite a racial holy war, though a specific target was never determined. The plot was thwarted when an attendant at a donut shop spotted a counterfeit $20 Chase tried to pass her. She alerted an off-duty Boston police officer, who then arrested Felton and Chase.

During the ensuing legal proceedings, the fact he was biracial was revealed and publicized, resulting in a large amount of publicity. In response, Felton attempted to kill himself. Both were found guilty, Felton of plotting to build a bomb, Felton was sentenced to 21 years and 10 months in prison, while Chase received 5. Felton was released from federal custody on December 12, 2020. He is an Odinist.

=== Later life ===
He later abandoned white supremacy and, writing in 2018, described his former life as "the most batshit-crazy ideological corner anyone has ever painted themselves into". He said he had since "refocused my center of gravity on the non-Western parts of my background", and changed his last name to a Yoruba one.

== See also ==
- Dan Burros
- Frank Collin
- Lawrence Dennis
