= Devekut =

Jewish concept referring to closeness to God

Devekut, debekuth, deveikuth or deveikus (דבקות; traditionally "clinging on" to God) is a Jewish concept referring to closeness to God. It may refer to a deep, trance-like meditative state attained during Jewish prayer, Torah study, or when performing the 613 commandments. It is particularly associated with the Jewish mystical tradition.

== Etymology ==
דבק, or deveq, the modern Hebrew word for glue, literally means 'to cling'. It is sometimes referred to as devequt, "dvequt" or devequs. The concept of Devequt is important in Jewish culture, particularly in Hasidism and in the history of Jewish thought, mysticism, and ethics. In modern Israeli Hebrew, "Devequt" or "dvequt" is also often a synonym for dedication toward a particular goal. In religious Judaism and in academia, "Dvequt" refers most commonly to the philosophical, mystical and Hasidic understanding of "Devequt" as "cleaving" or "attaching oneself" to God in all areas of life.

It refers to the highest form of love for God, which is a human's view of the divine. It is a balance between love of God and consumption by the fires of God. It is described as the love of a moth for the flame (you are the moth, God is the flame). Devakuth is the highest form of any love, because it is a humble holding back of oneself from the fires of God, while dancing as close as possible to the flames. To dance with and prolong one's longing for God (to be thankful for the longing alone) until one is burning with that longing is Devakuth. It is not a meditative state, it is a revelry. One's suffering and longing for the flame of God is higher than one's desire to meet that flame. When accomplished Devakuth is a thing of true beauty and power. To simply call it "clinging," is to miss this deeper, trickier "respectful withholding" aspect of the word's particular meaning.

== Deveikut and Jewish observance ==
=== Deveikut in cleaving to the Tzadik ===
The early Hasidic movement around the Baal Shem Tov developed from elite esoteric mystical circles of pneumatics, sometimes connected in practical fellowship. True Deveikut in early Hasidism reflected the superior nature of elevated mystical conduct, beyond the attainment of the regular community, though reaching out to encourage the common folk through popular mystical teaching. With the development of Hasidism as a large scale social movement through the disciples of Dovber of Mezeritch, the doctrine of Mainstream Hasidic "Popular Tzadikism" developed, especially by Elimelech of Lizhensk. In this, while true deveikut was unattainable by the common folk through their own efforts, the substitution of attachment, sometimes called "Deveikut", to the Tzadik enabled everyone to perceive and experience Divinity. This was the first time that Jewish mysticism, embodied in the elite esoteric deveikut of the Tzadik, was combined with practical, popular social doctrine and movement. Tzadikism, and its parallel worship of God through materiality, became the most distinctive feature of Hasidic Judaism, distinguishing Hasidism from other forms of traditional Judaism. The Tzadik embodied Divinity, through Hasidism's adaption of the Kabbalistic notion of Yesod-Foundation, becoming the channel of Divine spiritual and physical blessing to his followers. The Russian Chabad school of Shneur Zalman of Liadi and his successors became the exception from Mainstream Hasidism, in seeking to communicate the elite esoteric dimension of deveikut as widely as possible, through its approach of intellectual investigation of Hasidic thought. In this, as in the different Polish Peshischa-Kotzk school that stressed personal autonomy, the main role of the Tzadik was as teacher in Habad, or mentor in Peshischa. The most extreme form of Mainstream Tzadikism, sometimes opposed by other Hasidic leaders, was embodied in "Wonder-working" Rebbes, for whom Divine channelling of blessing through theurgic practice became central, at the expense of Torah teaching. Hasidism developed the customs of Tish (gathering), Kvitel (request) and Yechidut (private audience) in the conduct of the Tzadik.

=== Deveikut and Teshuvah ===
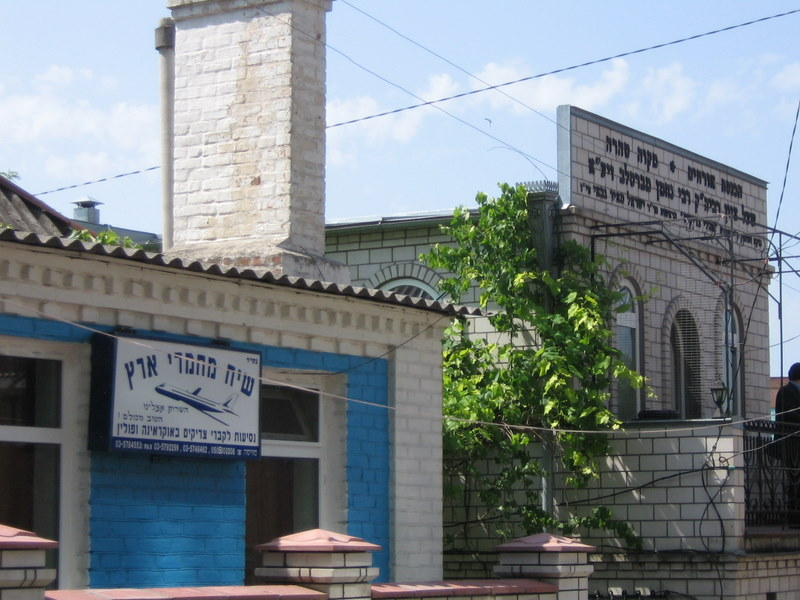
The Hasidic Rebbe Nachman of Breslov inspires a search for deveikut in distanced Jews. The annual Rosh Hashana kibbutz pilgrimage to his grave in Uman Ukraine, attracts many secular seekers of spirituality.

Teshuvah, often translated into English as "Repentance", literally means "Return" to God in Judaism. Halachic codes identify its defining stages in personal spiritual repentance and atonement from sin. Musar literature generally see its role in broader self-understanding, spiritual growth, and personal fidelity. Hasidic thought, based upon Kabbalistic exegesis, gives it a mystical ascending structure. It interprets two levels of return, "Lower Teshuvah" (Lower Return to God), and "Higher Teshuvah" (Higher Return). In Hasidic philosophy, Teshuvah does not only involve repentance and rectification of previous spiritual faults. Rather, as the Baal Shem Tov taught, even perfectly righteous Tzadikim need to return to God, in the higher Teshuvah of continual ascent in holiness. With new revelations of mystical Divinity, come new awareness of Bittul (self-nullification) and desire for God in Deveikut. According to Kabbalistic exegesis of the Hebrew word "Teshuvah" (תשובה), it can be read as "Returning the letter hei" (תשוב-ה). The Tetragrammaton essential Divine name has two letters "hei", the second one corresponding to the lower revealed levels of the Four Worlds in Kabbalah, and the first one corresponding to the higher concealed realms. Spiritual lapses by man only reach the lower realms. Lower teshuvah returns the second hei in rectification, higher teshuvah redeems the higher hei in holy ascent

In Hasidic lore, the path of Nachman of Breslov is especially related to giving redemption and encouragement to those people who are caught up in personal difficulties and spiritual impurity. Through his creative articulation of Hasidic mysticism, his teachings can awaken a desire for deveikut, the path of personal hitbodedut expression of one's problems, and a mystical Tikkun HaKlali rectification for all. His main work Lkkutei Moharan is colloquially referred to as the Hasidic book to help those in spiritual difficulties ("wickedness"). The Tanya of Schneur Zalman of Liadi is subtitled the "Hasidic book for the intermediate person" who has ease to intellectually meditate on Hasidic philosophy to reach inner Teshuvah. The work Noam Elimelech by Elimelech of Lizhensk instructs the "Hasidic book for the righteous", and the Mainstream Hasidic path of Teshuvah through cleaving to the Tzadik.

=== Deveikut and Hasidic prayer ===
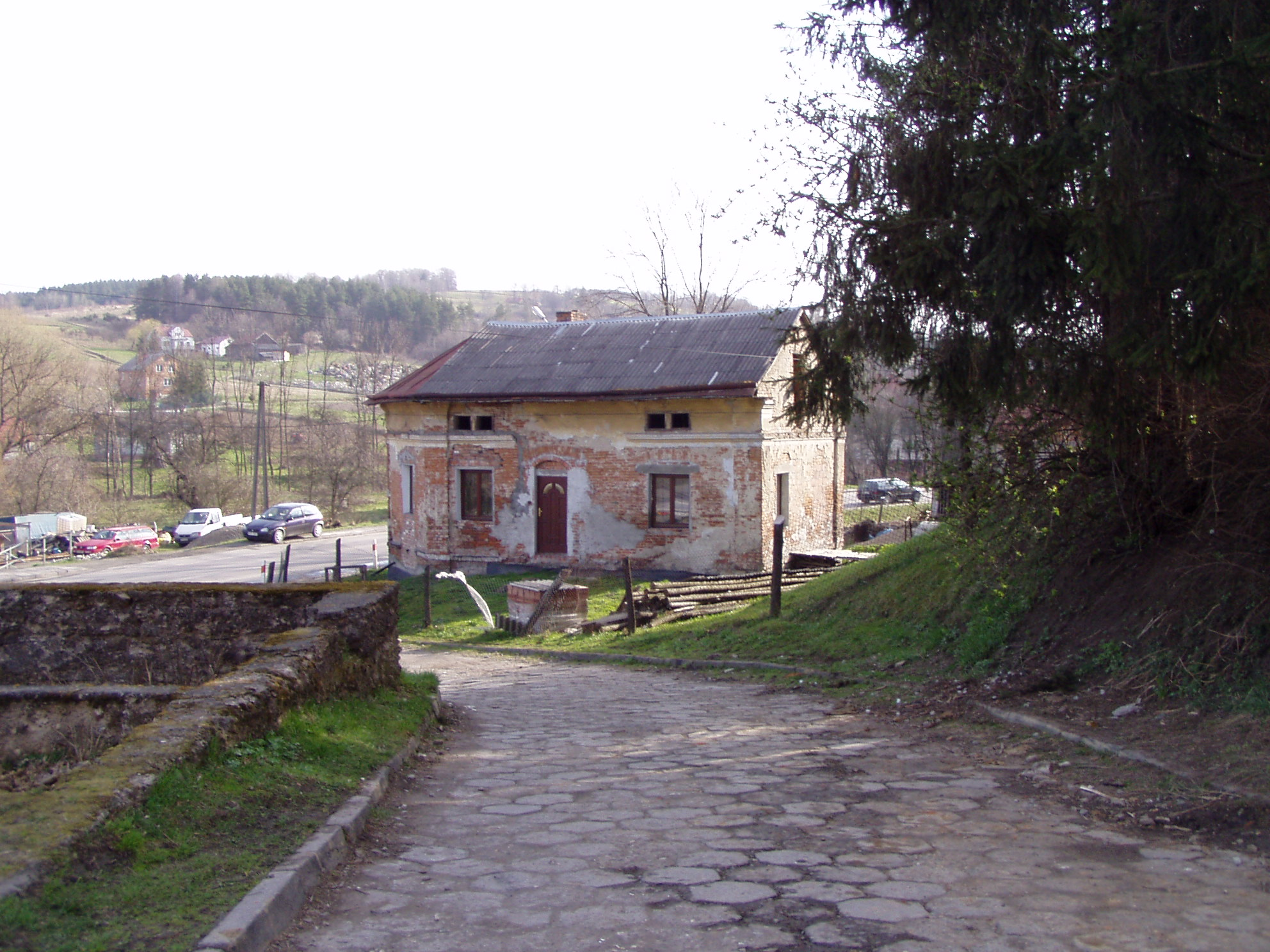
Mikveh (Ritual immersion pool) in Bircza, Poland. Hasidic custom encouraged male followers to prepare for daily or Sabbath prayer with immersion for mystical elevation

The Baal Shem Tov taught the spiritual value of simple Jewish folk. This was at a time after the 17th century Khmelnytsky Uprising had devastated Jewish communities in Ukraine, and a gap had evolved between the centres of Talmudic scholarship and the unlettered masses. With the traditional preeminence in Rabbinic Judaism on Torah study, it was perceived that the unlettered masses, though not at fault, were spiritually inferior. Maggidim toured Jewish communities offering admonishment of further punishment as a means of encouraging Jewish observance among the disenfranchised masses. In this arena, the Baal Shem Tov's mysticism taught that the sincere common folk could be closer to God than a scholar who has self-pride in his accomplishments. He conveyed his revolutionary ideas in parables, stories and terse teachings among the market places of the populace. The legendary tales about him, later copied in Shivchei HaBesht and other hagiographic compilations describe how much he cherished the sincere prayers of the simple, artless folk. In perhaps the most characteristic Hasidic story, the Baal Shem Tov's conduct instructed his new mystical teaching and boundless delight in the unlettered deveikut of the simple folk:

The saintly prayers of the Baal Shem Tov and his close circle were unable to lift a harsh Heavenly decree they perceived one Rosh Hashanah (New Year). After extending the prayers beyond their time, the danger remained. An unlettered shepherd boy entered and was deeply envious of those who could read the holy day's prayers. He said to God "I don't know how to pray, but I can make the noises of the animals of the field. "With great feeling, he cried out, "Cock-a-doodle-do. God have mercy!" Immediately, joy overcame the Baal Shem Tov, and he hurried to finish the day's prayers. Afterwards, he explained that the heartfelt prayer of the shepherd boy opened the Gates of Heaven, and the decree was lifted.

Through this emphasis, Hasidism popularised Jewish mysticism. It offered deveikut, that had previously been restricted in transcendent Kabbalistic forms, in new tangible, direct immanent perception. Later Hasidic paths adopted different methods in Jewish meditation for prayer, from the Breslov fostering of emotional Hitbodedut ("secluded" prayer), to Chabad intellectual Hitbonenut ("Contemplative" prayer).

A part this simple and emphatic inclusion in meditation for God, in the text Likutey Halakhot of Breslov hassidic groups, they teach one of the most hidden form of jewish prayers: one prayer is usually realized after some time, for example to have good business, sons and other important desires of religious man, but this is manifestation before or at the instant of "Devekut", as follow:

The Tabernacle was the resting place for the Divine Presence, which manifests via the prayers of the Jews. The entire Jewish nation camped around the Tabernacle, since each Jew acquired a portion in it through his prayers. For example, just as the contributions of many Jews combined to furnish the 100 silver sockets at the bases of the beams, the prayers of many Jews combined to create all the beams, bars, pillars, tapestries and vessels of the Tabernacle. Today, the more Jews who become involved in prayer, the more parts will be built for the "Temple", until the Divine Presence will be revealed once again

— Rebbe Nachman of Breslov

"Devekut" will be direct real revelation of good jewish intention to do Mitzvot and this should be unic true method to have miracle and manifestation of God.

=== Musical expression of Deveikut in Niggunim ===
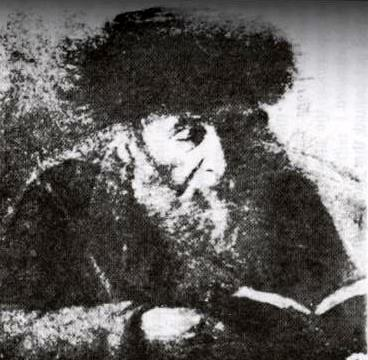
Hasidism found expression in distinctive Niggunim (ecstatic melodies). Private meditative deveikut niggunim, often in prayer, are usually wordless and bring elevation in worship.

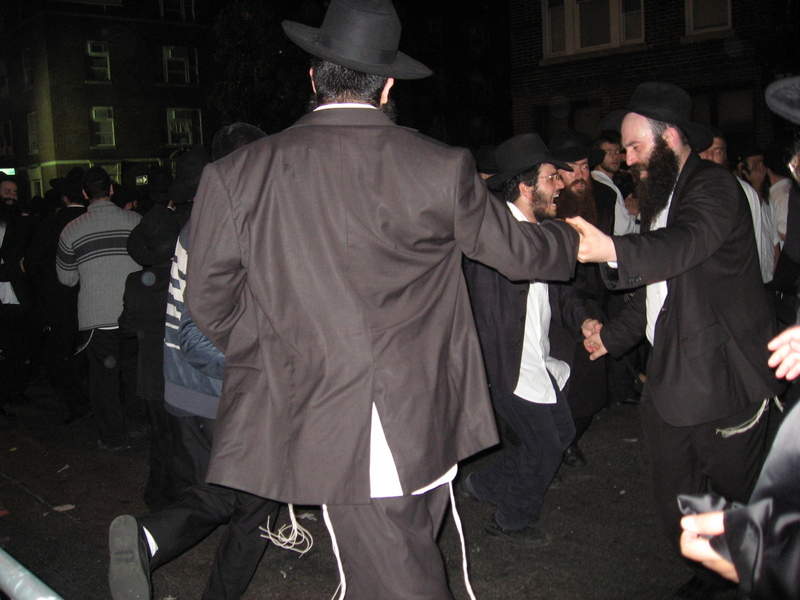
Joyous niggunim bring the inspiration of deveikut into action and celebration of Hasidic camaraderie.

A revival of interest in Jewish music was sparked as part of Hasidism. Hasidic niggunim melodies are a distinctive form of voice instrumental music, expressing its mystical emotions of deveikut. Hasidism gave new emphasis to song as a form of worship in prayer. As many niggunim are without words, it is taught that the niggun can reach spiritual levels higher than the words of prayer can reach, as they open the heart to love and awe of God. As many niggunim were composed by Hasidic Masters, it is thought that through singing their melodies, the follower can be attached and inspired by the soul of their Rebbe. This musical dimension of Hasidic deveikut, similar to the new forms of worship in Hasidic storytelling, captures the characteristics of its mystical ecstasy.

Different Hasidic groups evolved their own distinctive styles of niggun. Followers customarily gather around on Jewish holidays to sing in groups, receive and give spiritual inspiration, and celebrate brotherly camaraderie. Hasidic custom venerated pilgrimage to the particular Rebbe one had allegiance to, either to gain a private audience or to attend their public gatherings (Tish/Farbrengen). The celebrations give over his Torah teachings, sometimes personal messages, and are interspersed with inspirational niggunim.

There are nigunim for private meditation, often in prayer, called devekus nigunim. These are usually slower than communal nigunim, and without lyrics. The Baal Shem Tov spoke of devekus nigunim as "songs that transcend syllables and sound". Several tunes attributed to him are still used today.

Some niggunim originate from non-Jewish sources. Hasidic custom, based on a practice of the Baal Shem Tov, adapted secular anthems, marches and folk songs, ascribing to them a new spiritual interpretation. Hasidic belief is that these songs, in their secular forms, are in spiritual exile. By adapting them to liturgical forms, they are raising "Sparks of Holiness", based on the Kabbalistic rectification of Isaac Luria.

On Jewish festivals, such as in the intermediate days of Sukkot and during the traditional celebration of Simchat Torah, the most joyous day in the Jewish calendar, joyful niggunim are sung in the dancing in the synagogue.

=== Deveikut and Mitzvot ===
There is a historical debate in Rabbinic literature as to whether Torah study or Mitzvot (Jewish observances) are spiritually superior. The 613 Mitzvot themselves are able to be divided into ethical ("between man and man") and ritual ("between man and God") observances. Mystical literature, based on Kabbalah, gives its own metaphysical reasons for the mitzvot. Hasidism arose at a time when advanced Talmudic study was seen as the supreme Jewish activity, yet was out of reach of the unlettered masses. The Baal Shem Tov gave new prominence to prayer and sincere observance of the mitzvot by the artless common folk. To the Baal Shem Tov, "God desires the heart". Just as the simple prayers of the common masses could reach beyond the self-aware spirituality of scholars, so too, their mitzvot could also reach spiritual levels that the Tzadikim envyed and emulated.

In the profound dimension of Hasidic philosophical interpretation of Kabbalah, the mitzvot are described as the metaphorical "limbs of the King" (God) and an embrace of the Divine essence expressed within the Will of the commandments. Hasidic tales are told of the deveikut of Rebbes and simple Jewish folk in their fulfilment of the mitzvot. Many tales are related of the fervour of Levi Yitzchok of Berditchev, called the "Heavenly Advocate of Israel" before God. His saintly emotional response to deveikut would break restrained rules of conduct, sometimes humorously in public. In one story, he prepares himself to ritually slaughter a chicken according to the halachic laws of shechita:

As he recited the blessing prior to the act, he dwelt on the holy commandment he was about to perform. "Blessed art Thou, God..", he began. "..Who commands us concerning Shechita", he concluded in such fervour that he lost all sense of his surroundings. Opening his eyes after the blessing, he looked around to find an empty room, with the chicken escaped. "Where is the chicken" he began asking!

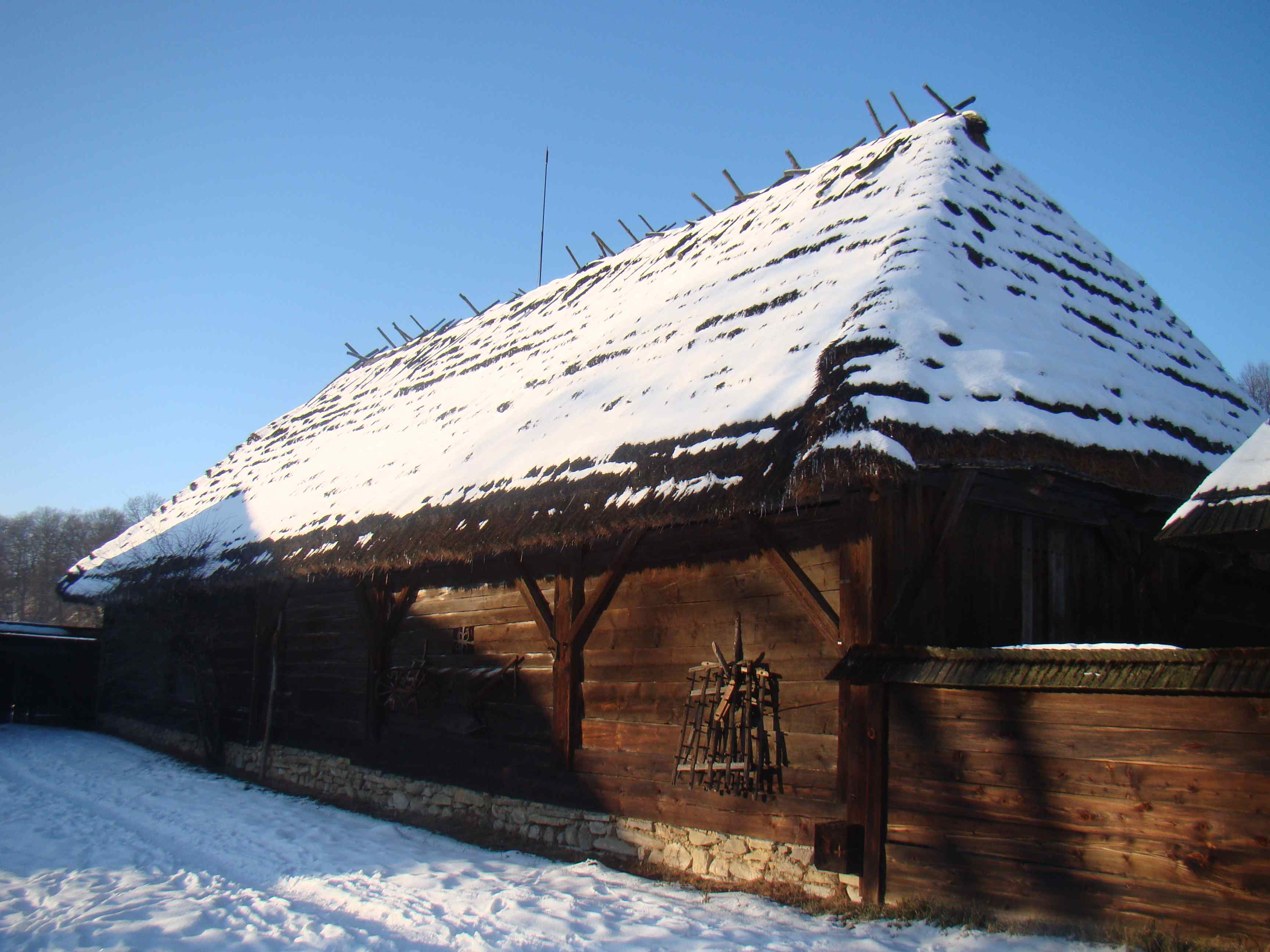
A Hasidic aphorism advises lighting a fire, rather than donning a fur coat to warm up; analogous to its aims of popularising mysticism, encouragement over admonishment, and rejection of asceticism.

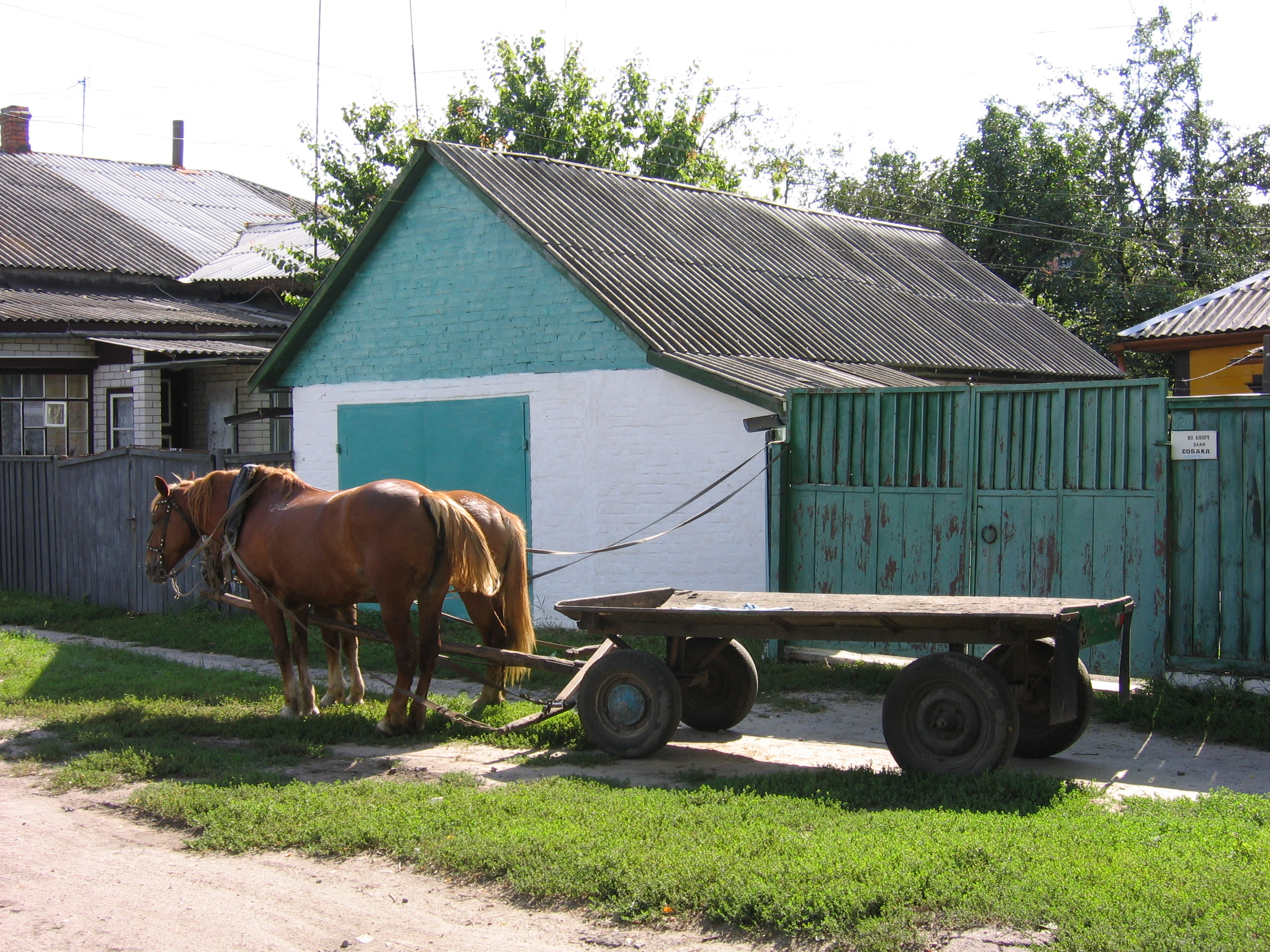
Hasidic stories describe pilgrimage to a Rebbe's court. The image of the itinerant features often in Hasidic theoretical and narrative literature.

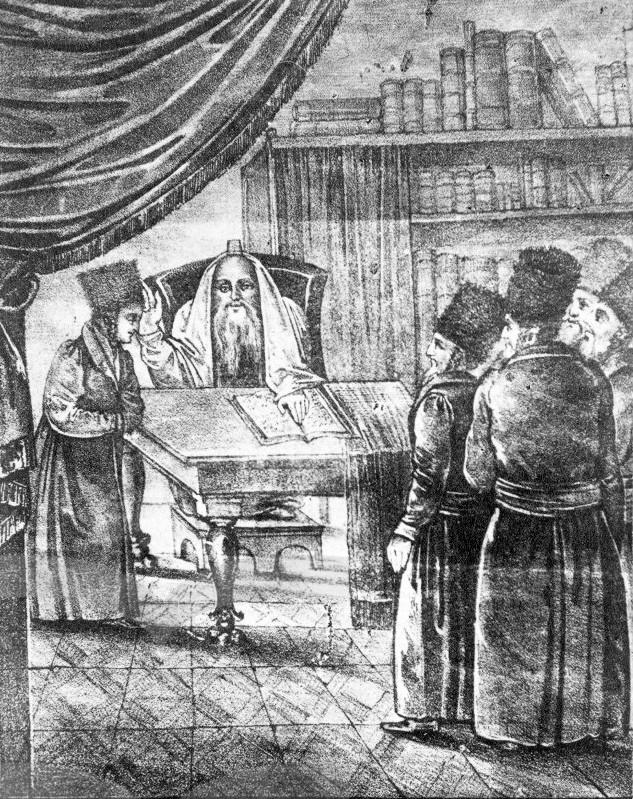
Hasidism comprises both elite contemplation of God, and popular deveikut to the Tzadik. The doctrine of "Popular Tzadikism" innovated social institution in Jewish mysticism.

Hasidic mysticism idealises material outcome for Divinity. The role it gives communal gathering and song over traditional added study, is to seek to open receptivity and self-accounting.

== See also ==
Jewish mysticism:

- Hasidic philosophy
- Jewish Renewal
- Kabbalah
- Neo-Hasidism

Practices:

- Jewish meditation
- Jewish prayer
- Mitzvot
- Niggun
- Teshuvah
- Tzedakah

Concepts:

- Awe of God
- Ayin and Yesh
- Inner dimensions of the Sephirot
- Jewish theology of love
- Love of God
- Ohr
- Bhakti yoga
