= Deyzh (Hasidic dynasty) =

Romanian Hasidic dynasty

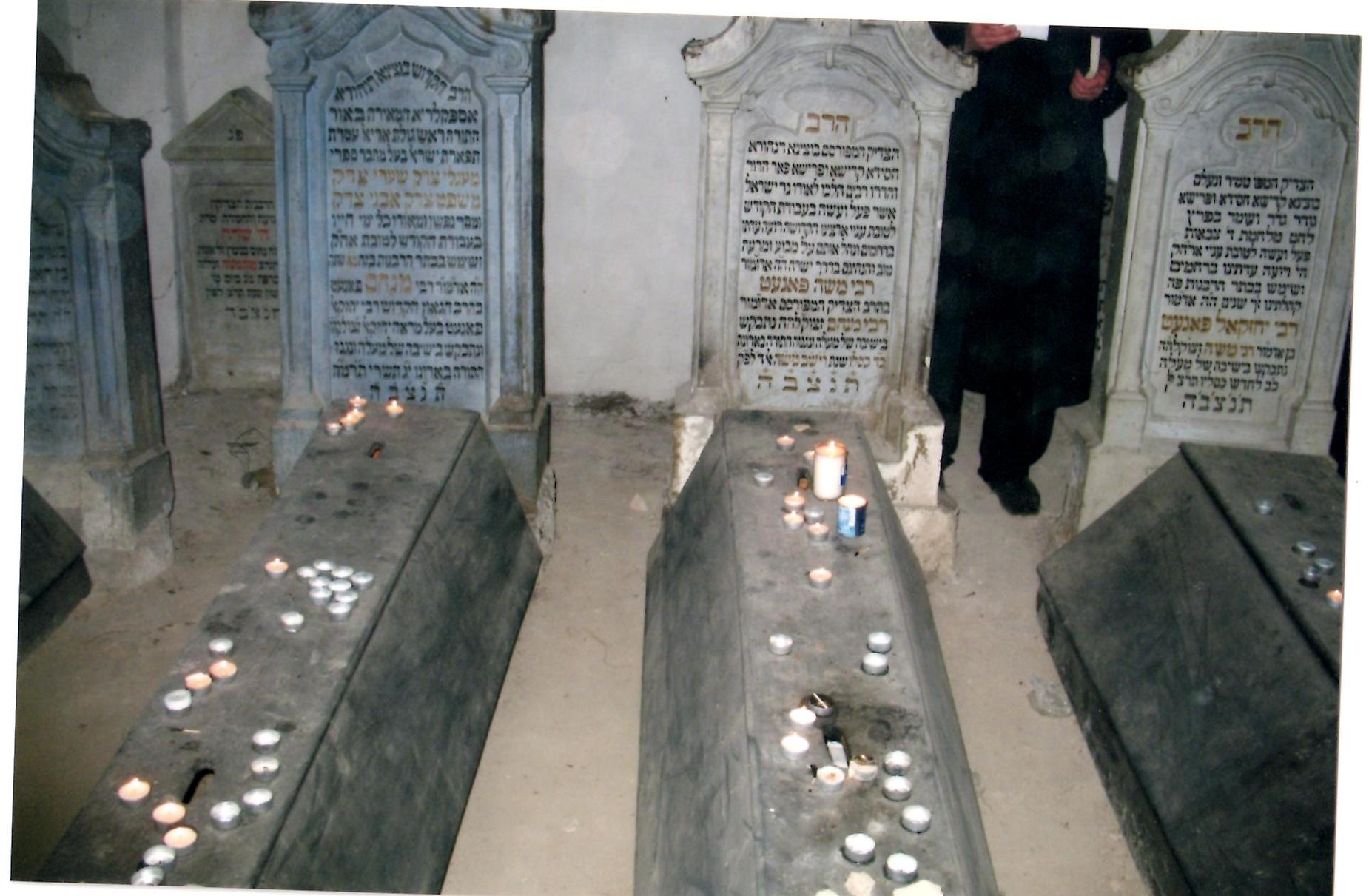
Graves of Deyzh rebbes Rabbi Yechezkel Panet, Rabbi Moshe Panet and Rabbi Menachem Panet in Dej.

Deyzh is a Hasidic dynasty that originated in the town of Dés, Austria-Hungary, now Dej, Romania.

== Foundation of the Dynasty ==
The founder of the dynasty was Rabbi Yechezkel Panet (1783-April 26/27, 1845), the author of the sefer “Mareh Yechezkel.” Rabbi Panet was born in the town of Bielsko-Biała, in Silesia to Rabbi Yosi and Breindel in 1783. He studied in Leipnik under Rabbi Boruch Frankel Thumim, in Prague under Rabbi Yehuda Leib Fishel, Rabbi Shmuel Landau, and Rabbi Elazar Fleklis, as well as in Linsk under Rabbi Menachem Mendel Rabin, the rabbi of Linsk and the father of Rabbi Naftali Zvi Horowitz of Ropshitz. He also studied with the Vilna Gaon. He studied chassidus under the Chozeh of Lublin, the Maggid of Koznitz, and Rabbi Menachem Mendel of Rimanov, who became his chief teacher.

== See also ==
- Dej ghetto
- List of Hasidic dynasties
