= Elimelech Szapira =

Polish Hasidic rebbe

- Title: Grodzhisker Rebbe

Personal life
- Born: Elimelech Szapira c. 1823
- Died: 29 March 1892 (1 Nisan 5652)
- Spouse: Chaya Masza Rabinowicz, Chana Brocho Szternfeld
- Children: Soro Devoiro; Yerachmiel; Chayim Myer Yechiel, Yeshayo Szapira; Klonimus Kalman Szapira
- Parents: The Sorof of Mogelnica (father); Gitl Wajsblum, granddaughter of the Maor VaShamesh who was a student of Noam Elimelech (mother)
- Dynasty: Grodzhisk

Religious life
- Religion: Judaism

Jewish leader
- Successor: Yisroel Szapira of Grodzhisk; Myer Yechiel Halsztuk, ABD Ostrovtse; Klonimus Kalman Szapira of Piasetzno
- Began: 1849
- Ended: 1892
- Main work: Imrei Elimelekh
- Dynasty: Grodzhisk

Rabbi Elimelech Szapira of Grodzhisk (1823–1892) was the leading Hasidic rebbe of his time in Poland. He was a chosid (follower) of the Rizhiner Rebbe. After the death of his father, the Sorof of Mogelnica, he assumed leadership of the Grodzhisk chasidim.

His sons-in-law were the Kozhnitser Rebbe Yaakov Yechiel Hopsztajn and Rebbe Osher the Second of Stolin-Karlin.

When he died, his surviving sons were aged two and three, the sons from his first marriage having predeceased him. Some of the chassidim waited for the sons to grow up; one eventually became the Piasetzner Rov. Other chassidim chose a grandson, Rabbi Yisroel Shapira as their next leader. A third group, including many learned rabbis, followed the scholarly Ostrovtser Rov. This led to the common epithet that when the Imrei Elimelech died, his main successors were the Rebbe fun der Daies (Rebbe of the opinions, the Ostrovtzer,) the Rebbe fun der Maiyes (Rebbe of the hundreds, a polite way of saying the wealthy Chassidim; his grandson, Rabbi Yisroel Shapira,) and the Rebbe fun der peiyes (Rebbe of the sidecurls, that is to say, the most intensely religious chassidim.) His youngest son, Yeshaya Shapira, became a rabbi but did not establish his own court, instead focusing on religious Zionism as an early leader in Hapoel HaMizrachi.

== Writings ==
The teachings of the Grodzhikser Rebbe are collected in Imrei Elimelech and Divrei Elimelech.
