= Kalonymus Kalman Shapira =

Polish rabbi and scholar (1889–1943)

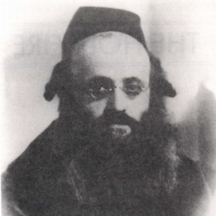
- Title: Piaseczno Rebbe (sometimes transliterated from Hebrew as Piasetzna Rebbe)

Personal life
- Born: Kalonymus Kalman Szapiro; May 20, 1889 Grodzisk Mazowiecki, Poland
- Died: November 3, 1943 (aged 54) Trawniki concentration camp
- Buried: not buried
- Spouse: Rochel Chaya Miryam Hopsztajn
- Children: Rechil Yehudis, Elimelech Ben-Tzion
- Parents: Elimelech Szapira of Grodzisk (father); Chano Brocho Szternfeld-Horowitz (mother)
- Dynasty: Piasetzno

Religious life
- Religion: Judaism

Jewish leader
- Successor: Elimelech Shapira
- Began: 1920
- Ended: 1943
- Main work: חובת התלמידים Chovas haTalmidim
- Dynasty: Piasetzno

Kalonimus Kalman Szapiro (English: Kalonymus Kalman Shapira or Klonimus Kalmish Szapiro) (20 May 1889 – 3 November 1943) was the Grand Rabbi of Piaseczno, Poland, who authored a number of works and was murdered by the Nazis during the Holocaust. He is best remembered for a series of homilies on parshah (weekly Torah portions) that were delivered almost every Shabbat during the time he spent with his students in the Warsaw ghetto between the years 1939 and 1942. Shortly after the final entry in this series of meditations, the entire community in the ghetto (between 80-90% of the population) was sent to the gas chambers in Treblinka. This work is collected under the title Esh Kodesh (often translated 'Holy Fire').

== Early years and life before the war ==
Kalonimus Kalman Szapiro was born in Grodzisk Mazowiecki, Poland. He was born on the day after Lag BaOmer, 19 Iyar 5649 (May 1889).

His father died when he was three. In 1905 he married Rachel Chaya Miriam, daughter of his nephew Grand Rabbi Yerachmiel Moshe of the Kozhnitz dynasty. They had two children: a son, Elimelech Ben Zion, and a daughter, Rechil Yehudis, both of whom were also murdered in the Holocaust.

In 1909 he was appointed rabbi of Piaseczno, near Warsaw, and subsequently attracted many hasidim. He established the yeshiva Da'as Moshe in 1923, which became one of the largest Hasidic yeshivot in Warsaw between the wars.

== War years ==
Shapira's only son, his daughter-in-law, and his sister-in-law were killed during the Nazi aerial bombing during the Siege of Warsaw in September 1939. After the invasion of Poland, Shapira was interned with a few of his Hasidim in the Warsaw Ghetto, where he ran a secret synagogue. He invested enormous efforts in maintaining Jewish life in the ghetto, including arranging for mikveh immersions and kosher marriages. Shapira was able to survive in the ghetto until its liquidation, avoiding deportations to the Treblinka extermination camp in the summer of 1942 because of the support of the Judenrat. Like other notables, he was employed at Schultz's shoe factory, a path to sustained survival.

Shapiro is especially well known for a book he wrote while in the Warsaw Ghetto. The book, which is a compilation of weekly sermons to his students, contends with complex questions of faith in the face of the mounting suffering of the Jews in the ghetto. When it became apparent to Shapira that the ghetto and its inhabitants were nearing their end, he transferred this book and other manuscripts to the Ringelblum Archive. They were buried with other documents in a large milk canister, which was found by a construction worker after the war. The book, originally simply entitled Torah Innovations from the years 5700-5702, was published in Israel in 1960 under the title Esh Kodesh 'Sacred Fire"'. Daniel Reiser republished it in a two-volume critical edition, Sermons from the Years of Rage, in 2017.

After the Warsaw Ghetto Uprising was crushed in 1943, Shapira was taken to the Trawniki concentration camp near Lublin. Although offered the opportunity to escape, he apparently refused. Following the Treblinka uprising in August 2, 1943 and the Sobibor uprising in October 14, 1943, there was increasing concern among the Nazi authorities that there would be further outbreaks of violence at other concentration camps. For this reason, Operation Harvest Festival was launched. During this operation, carried out on November 3, 1943, all the remaining Jews in Trawniki, including Rabbi Szapiro, were shot to death.

== Works ==
- Chovas HaTalmidim 'The Students' Obligation' - a collection of essays aimed at teenagers that has become a standard textbook in yeshivas. It was first published in Warsaw in 1932.
- Shalosh Maamarim 'Three Sermons' - an introduction to Hasidic thought, published as an addendum to Chovas Hatalmidim.
- Hachshoras HaAvreichim 'Preparation of Young Men' - a work written for young married men as a sequel to Chovas HaTalmidim. It was published from a manuscript buried in the ghetto.
- Mevo haSheorim - Both the continuation of Hachshoras HaAvreichim and intended to be the introduction to Chovas HaAvreichim, which was to have been the final book in the series on education and spiritual guidance. Only Mevo HaSheorim survived from this manuscript, buried in the ghetto. According to Daniel Reiser, the manuscript of Chovas HaAvreichim wasn't lost; rather, Shapira didn't have the opportunity to compose it before World War II, aside from the brief section published in Derech HaMelech.
- Tzav V'Ziruz - Shapira's personal diary, translated into English as To Heal the Soul. It was also published from a manuscript buried in the ghetto.
- Bnei Machshava Tova 'Experiencing the Divine' was originally distributed by Shapira to his closest Hasidim in the early 1920s as a secret handbook for the establishment of secret mystical fraternities. The book is a guide to cultivating spirituality through a variety of spiritual and mystical techniques, including group-guided imagery meditation.
- Derech HaMelech 'The Way of the King' - Torah discourses that were spoken on Shabbat and Jewish holidays during the 1920s and 1930s. The text is based upon copies of the sermons made by Shapira's followers. It also includes letters, documents, and other writings, such as the only surviving chapters of his projected work Chovas HaAvreichim and his commentary on the Zohar. It also includes a description of his original "hashkata" (mind-quieting) meditation technique.
- Esh Kodesh 'Holy Fire' - his inspirational speeches given during the Holocaust. (A Critical and Annotated Edition of Kalonymus Kalman Shapira's Sermons during the Holocaust 2 Vol. 630 pp.)

== Lineage ==
Shapira's father was Elimelech Szapira, of the Hasidic dynasty of Grodzhisk. Kalonymus Kalman Shapiro was named after his great-grandfather,Klonimus Kalman Epstein. The elder Kalonymos Kalman (1753-1825) studied under Elimelech of Lizhensk and eventually became his assistant. As such, he was present at the birth of Polish Hasidism and studied and worked alongside Yaakov Yitzchak of Lublin, Yisroel Hopstein, and Menachem Mendel of Rimanov. Thus, there is an established and unbroken lineage, from teacher to student, linking Shapira back to Elimelech of Lizhensk and his twin brother Zusya, who were the earliest promoters of Hasidic Judaism in Poland, having studied with the Dov Ber of Mezeritch, grandson of the Baal Shem Tov.

== Legacy ==
=== Israel ===
The current Rebbe of Piaseczno is Rabbi Kalman Menachem Shapira, a great-nephew of the first Rebbe, Klonimous Kalman. Rabbi Kalman Menachem resides in Ramat Beit Shemesh, Israel and leads Congregation Aish Kodesh, which is both a synagogue and the worldwide headquarters for spreading the teachings of his great-uncle. Study halls named Aish Kodesh are also located in Moshav Mevo Modi'im, Beitar Illit and in Bnei Brak. There is a yeshiva in Baka, Jerusalem called Yeshivat Chovat Hatalmidim, where students under the helm of Rabbi Yair HaLevi learn the legendary teachings of The Piaseczna Rabbi. In Samaria there is a small settlement named "Aish Kodesh". It was established in memory of Aish Kodesh Gilmore, who was killed in a terrorist attack by the PLO on October 30, 2000, during the Second Intifada.

=== United States ===
Congregation Aish Kodesh, founded in 1992 and dedicated to the memory and teachings of Rabbi Szapiro, is the first synagogue to call itself by that name. Led by Rabbi Moshe Weinberger, the neo-Hasidic synagogue is located in Woodmere, Long Island, New York. There is also a yeshiva called Aish Kodesh in Virginia.

There is also a synagogue in Boulder, Colorado, founded in 2000, named Aish Kodesh. It was led by Rabbi Gavriel Goldfeder for ten years between 2003 and 2013. There is a recently founded synagogue in Manchester England named Aish Kodesh.

=== Europe ===
In 2010, the first synagogue in Post-holocaust Europe was opened under the name Adass Aish Kodesh and is led by Rabbi Y. Reuven Rubin, formerly of South Manchester Synagogue.
