= Klonimus Kalman Epstein =

Leader of the Chassidic movement

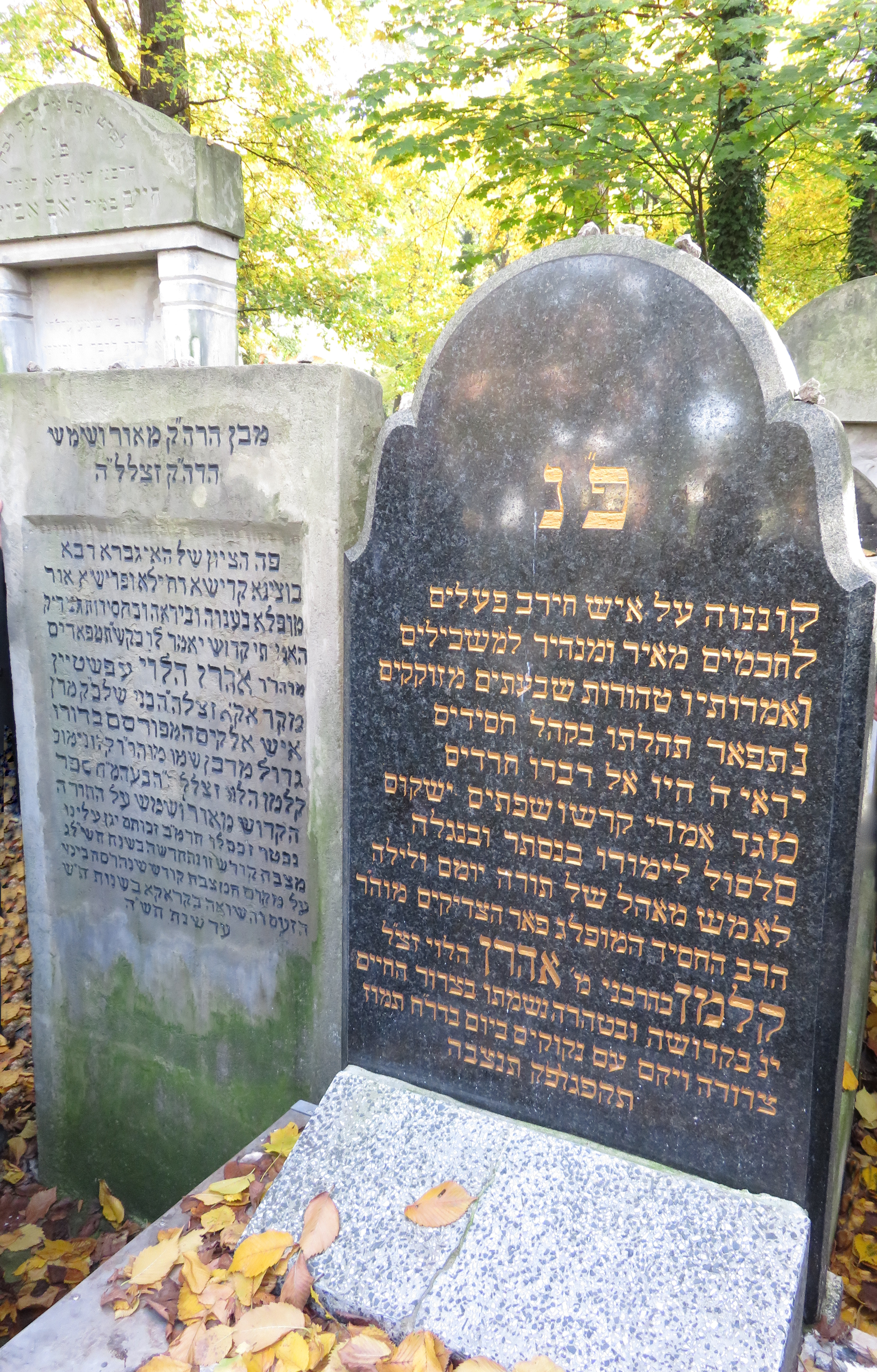
Epstein's tombstone (right) & his son Aharon's (2016).

Kalonymus Kalman Halevi Epstein (Hebrew: רבי קלונימוס קלמן אפשטיין; Nowy Korczyn (Neustadt), Poland, 1753 – Kraków, 1825) was a rabbi, Kabbalist and a leader of the Chassidic movement, known as the Maor Vashamesh (מאור ושמש) after his Hebrew book.

== Biography ==
Born in 1753, Epstein, known as "Kalmish," was the son of Aaron Halevi Epstein. Epstein's early years were lived in abject poverty in Neustadt, Poland, one of 10 children, before his father moved the family to Kraków to seek a better life when Epstein was five years old. In Kraków, he became known as an Illui (young prodigy). As a child, after selling bagels baked in the home of his parents to assist in his family's support, Epstein would sneak into the beth midrash and listen to the Torah sermons given by Krakow scholars, including Yitzchak Halevi, Chief Rabbi of Kraków. One day following one of the sermons, Mordechai Gutgold, one of the wealthiest Jews in Krakow, asked Epstein in jest to repeat the sermon that he had just heard, which he did, word for word. In response, Gutgold agreed to support Epstein and fund his Yeshiva education, provided that his father agreed to the marriage of Epstein and Gutgold's daughter as soon as Epstein reached Bar Mitzvah. At the age of 13, Epstein married Gutgold's daughter, Milka Raidel.

After being deeply impressed by the Hassidic leader Elimelech of Lizhensk during his visit to Krakow, Epstein traveled to Lizhensk hoping to study Torah and Chassidut under the direct tutelage of Elimelech, against his father-in-law's wishes but with the support of his wife. Upon Epstein's arrival in Lizhensk, Elimelech sent him to study under Yechiel Michel of Zlotchov. After less than two weeks at Yechiel Michel's home, Epstein returned to Lizhensk with a message from Yechiel Michel to Elimelech that "you will not find others like Kalmish."

Epstein went on to become the most favored of Elimelech's students, also acting as the rabbi's personal "shamash" (assistant). In recognition of Epstein's aptitude, Elimelech sent him, in 1785, to assume the Chassidic leadership of Krakow.

Upon his arrival in Krakow, Epstein was met with great opposition by the misnagdim, opponents of the Chassidic movement, but eventually they came to respect him. His reputation as a holy leader began to grow throughout Western Galicia, and Jews began visiting him over far distances to seek his counsel and guidance and to receive his blessings. Epstein managed to raise the profile of Chassidut throughout Western Galicia, and became a friend of Yitzchak Halevi. During a visit to Lizhensk, Elimelech, who was close to death, requested that Epstein succeed him and assume the mantle of leadership in the city of Lizhensk, which he declined.

Among Epstein's contemporaries as leading students of Elimelech were the Chozeh of Lublin, the Maggid of Kozhnitz, Rebbe Menachem Mendel of Rimanov and the Apta Rebbe. Epstein referred to all of them as "Rebbe," as he called all of the Chassidic leaders of his generation, as a mark of respect.

Toward the end of his life, Epstein instructed his younger son Aharon to gather together all of his writings and sermons, which was later published as the sefer Maor Vashemesh - the title by which he later became known. The kabbalistic commentary of the Maor Vashemesh is still studied by Chassidic and non-Chassidic Jews today, and some Chassidic leaders have referred to the Maor Vashemesh as the "Shulchan Aruch" of Chassidut. Epstein died on the second day of Rosh Chodesh Tamuz in 1825 at the age of 72.

== Family ==
Epstein and his wife had two sons and several daughters. His younger son Aharon became the Rebbe of the Krakow community when his father died and became known as "Reb Oron". His older son Yosef Baruch became known as the "Guter Yid" (the Good Jew) or the "miracle worker of Neustadt." His great-grandson was Rabbi Kalonymus Kalman Shapira of Piaseczna.
