= Jacob Samson of Shepetovka =

Polish–Lithuanian rabbi (1720–1801)

Jacob Samson ben Yitzhak of Shepetovka

Personal life
- Born: 1720 Volhynian Voivodeship, Polish–Lithuanian Commonwealth
- Died: 15 May 1801 (aged 80–81) Tiberias, Ottoman Empire
- Parent: Yitzhak of Shepetovka (father)

Religious life
- Religion: Judaism

Rabbi Jacob Samson of Shepetovka (Hebrew: יעקב שמשון משפיטובקה) (1720 – 15 May 1801) was a member of the third generation of the early Hasidic movement. He was a member of the Old Yishuv and migrated to Tiberias.

== Biography ==
Jacob was born to Rabbi Yitzhak of Slavuta, Shepetivka, Uman (Polish–Lithuanian Commonwealth), and Be'er. During his formative years, he was recognized as a prodigy of rabbinic studies, and he studied with the Maggid of Mezeritch and Rabbi Pinchas of Koretz.

Hasidic legend states that he was known for his erudition and teaching ability, causing him to be tasked by the Maggid with spreading Hasidic theology among rabbis in the area who disagreed with Hasidism. He eventually reached the Rabbi Yechezkel Landau of Prague, who was a well-renowned rabbi as far away as Judea, who allegedly got into a fight with him about the importance of the book, Toldot Yaakov Yosef, which Jacob won. The debate was recounted in Emery Noam by Rabbi Moshe Leib Shapira.

Although originally making Aliyah around 1790 through Acre, he returned to Europe and later travelled back in 1795. He settled in the city of Tiberas, meeting Abraham Kalisker. He travelled abroad in order to raise money for Polish immigrants living in Israel. He permanently returned in 1799, and settled in Haifa. In the book, Praise of the Ran, it is said that he bumped into the emissary of Rabbi Nachman of Breslov, who was looking for a ship where Nachman could return home to. Jacob provided the money quickly to the emissary in fear that they would be caught by Ottoman authorities for trying to arrange funds for travel back to Europe. Nachman saw it as a sign that he should stay longer in the Land of Israel. Later, Nachman reconciled with Abraham and Jacob.

== Legacy ==
Jacob had at least two daughters who married, one to Rabbi Yehuda Meir Shapira of Shepetovka, son of Rabbi Pinchas of Koretz, and Rabbi Yisrael Yehuda Leib of Krasna.

In 2017, a beit midrash in Tiberias was established bearing his name.
