= Jacob Joseph of Polonne =

Jacob Joseph of Polonne, (1710–1784, Hebrew: יעקב יוסף הכהן), or Yaakov Yosef of Pollonye, was a rabbi who was one of the first disciples of the founder of Hasidic Judaism, the Baal Shem Tov.

== Biography ==
Yaakov Yosef had been an adherent of the school of Lurianic Kabbalah. Before following the Baal Shem Tov, he was rabbi of the city of Sharhorod for several years, where his pietistic asceticism and self-isolation alienated his community and led to his being fired from his position on a Friday afternoon (just before Shabbat) in 1748. Afterwards he joined the new hasidic movement and settled in Rașcov.

His book Toldot Yaakov Yosef, published in 1780, was the first hasidic work ever published. He is a significant source for the Baal Shem Tov's sayings, and quotes those he heard firsthand in a section called "Words I Heard from My Master."

== Teachings ==
He says of the dual requirement in Judaism to both love and fear God that when one reaches a high level of inwardness of the soul, fear and love of God coalesce into one, becoming indistinguishable from one another, eliminating the need to give priority to one over the other.

== Works ==
He wrote four books:

- Toledot Yaakov Yosef (1780). The first Chassidic work ever published, and the primary source for various sayings of the Ba‘al Shem Tov as well as members of his inner circle. It is "in the main a compilation of sermons, arranged according to the Torah portion of the week.... [and] contains the most basic paradigms of the Hasidic worldview."
- Ben Porat Yosef (1781). Sermons, mainly on Genesis; also, the first book to contain “Igeret ‘aliyat ha-neshamah” (The Epistle of the Ascendance of the Soul).
- Tzafnat Paneach (1782), on Exodus
- Ketonet Pasim (1866; published posthumously), on Leviticus and Numbers.

The titles of these four works are all biblical allusions to Jacob Joseph's own name, in particular the figure of Joseph.
