= Menachem Mendel of Rimanov =

Polish rabbi (1745–1815)

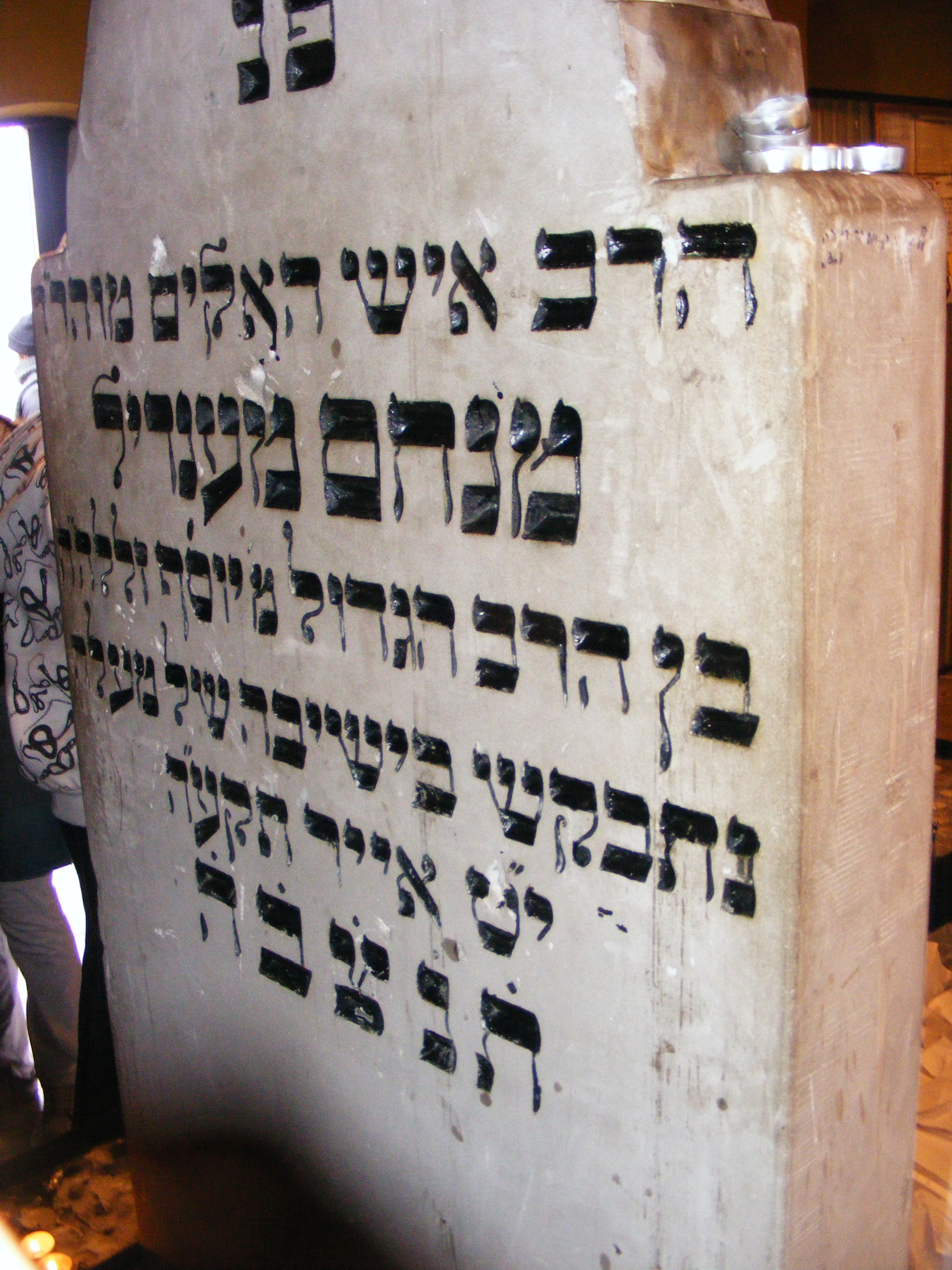
- Tombstone of Rabbi Menachem Mendel of Rimanov.
- Title: Menachem Mendel of Rimanov

Personal life
- Born: 1745 Przytyk, Poland
- Died: May 29, 1815 (aged 69–70) Rymanów, Poland
- Buried: Rymanów, Poland
- Spouse: Rivke
- Children: Rabbi Nosson Leib, Rabbi Yisrael Yaakov of Bilyi Kamin, Feige, Chana
- Parents: Yosef Szydlowski (father); Liba Spira (mother)
- Dynasty: Rimenov

Religious life
- Religion: Judaism

Jewish leader
- Successor: Rebbe Tzvi Hersch HaKohen
- Main work: Menachem Zion
- Dynasty: Rimenov

Menachem Mendel of Rimanov also known as Mendele Rimanover (Alt. spellings: Riminov, Rimanev) (1745–May 29, 1815) was a famous Hasidic Rebbe and one of the first five distributors of the Hasidic movement in Poland and Galicia together with Rabbi Yaakov Yitzchak of Lublin, Rabbi Yisrael Hopstein, Rabbi Avraham Yehoshua Heshel of Apta, and Rabbi Kalonymus Kalman Epstein.

== Early life ==
Menachem Mendel was born in 1745 in Nowy Korczyn to an old rabbinical Polish family reportedly descended from the Baal HaTurim. According to one account, he was introduced to Hasidut at the age of 18 when he met Dov Ber of Mezeritch. As a youth, he studied under Shmelke of Nikolsburg at Ryczywol and Joseph ben Meir Teomim in Berlin. His primary mentor was Elimelech of Lizhensk and he was among his most celebrated students. After Rav Elimelech's death in 1786, Rebbe Menachem Mendel assumed his position as the principal Chassidic Master in Galicia.

== Chassidic Court ==
As one of the five main disciples of Rav Elimelech of Lizhensk, Rebbe Menachem Mendel was a key figure in the development of the Chassidic movement in Galicia. The Rebbe originally established his court in Fristik where he was the Av Beit Din. His circle attracted a number prestigious scholars. He enjoyed the confidence and esteem of Zusha of Hanipol, Menachem Mendel Rubin of Liska, the Chozeh of Lublin, the Maggid of Kozhnitz, Avraham Yehoshua Heshel of Opatow, Klonimus Kalman Epstein ("Maor Vashemesh") of Cracow, Moshe of Przeworsk, Meshullam Feivush Heller, Yitzchak Isaac Taub, Uri of Strelisk, Aharon Leib of Peremyshlyan, Yaakov Yitzchak of Peshischa, Moshe Chaim Ephraim of Sudilkov and Boruch of Medzhybizh.

Rebbe Menachem Mendel taught many future luminaries of the Chassidic movement, including Naftali of Ropshitz, Tzvi Elimelech Spira of Dinov, Tzvi Hirsh of Zidichov, Moshe of Sambor ("Tefilas LeMoshe"), Yechezkel Paneth ("Mareh Yechezkel"), Meir of Apta ("Or LaShamayim"), Shimon of Yaroslav, Shlomo Leib of Letchna, Asher Yeshayahu of Ropschitz, Yehoshua of Dinov, Avraham Mordechai of Dobromil, Yehuda Zvi of Rozdol, Zalke of Sanz, Mendel of Stryszów, and Yaakov Tzvi Yolles ("Meloh HaRo'im"). He encouraged Moshe Teitelbaum (Ujhel) to become Rebbe. Thus, many Chassidic dynasties have their roots in Rebbe Menachem Mendel's court.

In 1807, Rebbe Menachem Mendel moved his court to Rimanov and resided there until his death. His arrival significantly accelerated the town's socio-economic development. Many Chassidim now journeyed to the rabbi and, requiring food and lodging, provided the local Jewish community with income. The Rebbe's court also offered employment for many waiters, servants, guides, messenger bearers, maintenance people and sextons.

== Activity ==
Talmudist and Kabbalist, Rebbe Menachem Mendel was known to be a pious man who lived his life dedicated to the service of God. Legends tell of him curing the sick, his Talmudic studies which were seldom interrupted by sleep, his acts of ascetism and self-flagellation, and his religious guidance of his community.

The Rimanover Rebbe was heavily involved in Jewish welfare and provided generously for orphans and strangers. Concerned with arbitrating proper justice, he urged the community to support a school for poor children, while forbidding burial societies from overcharging wealthy families. On the last day of every month the Rebbe would check the scales in every shop. But the Rebbe's social concerns ranged beyond Rimanov. He presided over the Kollel Meir Baal HaNes organization in Galicia, which provided funds for struggling Jewish communities in the Land of Israel. He is best known for having delivered Shabbos sermons on Parshath HaMan for 22 years, during which period his students testified he brought down blessings from Heaven. The Rebbe is popularly believed to have introduced the segulah for parnassah (sustenance) of reciting Parashas Hamonn in form of Shnayim Mikrah v'Echod Targum annually on the Tuesday of Parashas Beshalach.

Rebbe Menachem Mendel was an ardent opponent of modernity and the Jewish emancipation, fearing it would lead to assimilation and the breakdown of the Jewish way of life. He is regarded as one of the founders of Ultra-Orthodox Judaism in Poland and Hungary. He opposed the domicilization of Jews in small villages outside the organized Jewish community. Additionally, the Rimanover was zealous in demanding adherence to the laws of Jewish modesty. He insisted on men and women retaining traditional Jewish garb and not emulating any modern styles, especially with regard to ostentatious clothing. The Rebbe's strict guidelines ultimately became the set standard of Chassidic dress.

Rebbe Menachem Mendel was anguished by the exile of the Jewish people from their homeland, maintaining they could only reach their full spiritual potential in the Land of Israel, and anticipated the coming of the Messiah. Towards the end of his life, the Rimanover associated Napoleon with Gog and Magog, and he prayed for his victory, which he believed would usher the Messianic age. Legend has it the Rebbe's form appeared to Napoleon in dreams as long as the latter was under Divine protection.

== Family ==
Rebbe Menachem Mendel married Rivka, the daughter of a wealthy merchant from Frysztak. Their children:

1. Rabbi Nosson Leib Torem (d. 1846) of Rymanow.

2. Rabbi Yisrael Yaakov Torem (d. 1827), Av Beis Din of Bilyi Kamin.

3. Feige, married R' Klonimos of Lancut.

4. Chana, married R' Mordechai, Av Beit Din of Rymanow.

5. Chava Eisler of Turka

6. Gittel Guzik of Korczyna

7. Aron Torem of Kanczuga

8. Pinkas Torem of Rymanow

9. Unknown daughter, married Herz from Ustrzyki

== Legacy ==
Rebbe Menachem Mendel died on May 29 (19th of Iyar), 1815. His sons refused to succeed him and the dynasty was later assumed by the Rebbe's former servant, Rav Tzvi Hersh Hakohen of Rimanov (1778–1846), called Reb Tzvi Hersh Meshares, author of Be'eros Hamayim.

Rebbe Menachem Mendel's Torah commentary was first published in Menachem Zion (Chernivtsi, 1851), based on notes taken by his student Rav Yechezkel Paneth. Other compilations of the Rebbe's Torah were published in Divrei Menachem (Lviv, 1863), Ilana deChaye (Piotrków, 1908), and have been reprinted. The commentaries were translated in English as The Torah Discourses of the Holy Tzaddik Reb Menachem Mendel of Rimanov (New Jersey, 1997).

The earliest stories about the Rimanover Rebbe were first published in Ahron Marcus' Der Chassidismus (Pleszew, 1901) and Berel Ehrmann's Devarim Areivim Vol. 1 (Munkacz, 1904). The first official biography Ateres Menachem (Bilgoraj, 1910), published by Tzvi Yechezkel Michelson, was followed by Yekutiel Kamelhar's Beis Menachem (Tarnow, 1927) and Aharon Roth's Menachem Tzion (Satu Mare, 1935). Other biographies include Matityahu Guttman's Rabi Mendel mi-Rimanov (Tel Aviv, 1953), Menashe Unger's Die Chassidishe Velt (New York, 1955), Rebbe Menachem Mendel fun Rimanov (Jerusalem, 1987), and Chaim David Bacon's Rebbe Mendele Rimanover (New York, 1988).

There are several shuls (synagogues) named Rimanov, either by followers of the Rimanover hasidim, or led by descendants of Rebbe Menachem Mendel and his successor Rebbe Tzvi Hersh.

- Brooklyn, New York:
  - "Toras Menachem of Rimanov", led by Rabbi Mendel Goldberger (a descendant of Rebbe Menachem Mendel) at 104 Spencer Street, Williamsburg, Brooklyn. This synagogue is uniquely known for the many Minyanim performed simultaneously (there could be up to 4 services performed in a single Friday night).
  - "Beeros HaMayim", led by Rabbi Chaim Elazar Wassertheil, Rimanover Rebbe (a descendant of Rebbe Menachem Mendel), at 1870 53rd Street.
  - Cong. Menachem Zion Yotzei Russia, led by Rabbi Avraham Reich, (a 7 generation descendant of Rebbe Menachem Mendel), at 928 44th Street.
- Jerusalem
  - Rabbi Chaim Yaakov Frankel, Rimanover Rebbe (a descendant of Rebbe Tzvi Hersh), leads a network of kollels.

Rebbe Mendele's Ohel in Rymanow is a regular pilgrimage site for Chassidim. The original Ohel and tombstone were destroyed in the Holocaust and rebuilt after the war with an inscription based on the text preserved in Chassidic literature.
