= Rimenov (Hasidic dynasty) =

Polish Hasidic dynasty

Rimanov (Yiddish: רימאנאוו [rɨˈmanuf]) is the name of a Hasidic rabbinical dynasty within Orthodox Judaism. The dynasty originated in Rymanów in Poland's Subcarpathian Voivodeship.

== Rimenov rebbes ==
The first Rebbe of Rimanov was Grand Rabbi Menachem Mendel of Rimanov (1745–1815), author of Sifrei haRahak Rabbi Menachem Mendel me-Rymanów, Divrei Menachem, Menachem Tzion and Toras Menachem.

His disciple and successor was Rav Tzvi Hersh Hakohen of Rimanov (1778–1846), called Reb Tzvi Hersh Meshares, author of Be'eros Hamayim.

== Rimenov shuls ==
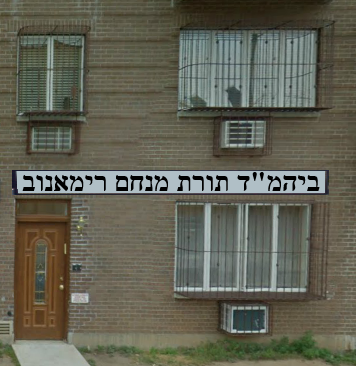
Front of building of the Rimanov Shul in Williamsburg

There are many shuls (synagogues) named Rimanov, either by followers of the Rimanov hasidim, or led by descendants of Rabbi Menachem Mendel of Rimanov or of his disciple, Rabbi Hershel of Rimanov.

- Williamsburg, Brooklyn, NY: Rimanov Shul "Toras Menachem of Rimanov", led by Rabbi Mendel Goldberger (a descendant of Rabbi Menachem Mendel of Rimanov) at 104 Spencer Street, Williamsburg, Brooklyn. This synagogue is uniquely known for the many Minyanim performed simultaneously (there could be up to 4 services performed in a single Friday night).
- Borough Park, Brooklyn:
  - "Beeras Hamayim", led by Rabbi Chaim Elazar Wassertheil, Rimanover Rebbe of Borough Park, at 1870 53rd Street. He is a direct descendant of Rabbi Menachem Mendel of Rymanow,
  - Cong. Menachem Zion Yotzei Russia, led by Rabbi Avraham Reich, a seventh-generation direct descendant of Rabbi Menachem Mendel of Rymanow, at 928 44th Street.
