= Hasidic philosophy =

Teachings of the Hasidic movement

Hasidic philosophy or Hasidism (Hebrew: חסידות), alternatively transliterated as Hasidut or Chassidus, consists of the teachings of the Hasidic movement, which are the teachings of the Hasidic rebbes, often in the form of commentary on the Torah (the Five books of Moses) and Kabbalah (Jewish mysticism). Hasidism deals with a range of spiritual concepts such as God, the soul, and the Torah, dealing with esoteric matters but often making them understandable, applicable and finding practical expressions.

With the spread of Hasidism throughout Ukraine, Galicia, Poland, and Russia, divergent schools emerged within Hasidism. Most if not all schools of Hasidic Judaism stress the central role of the Tzadik, or spiritual and communal leader, in the life of the individual

Etymologically, the term, hasid is a title used for various pious individuals and by various Jewish groups since biblical times, and an earlier movement, the Hasidei Ashkenaz of medieval Germany was also called by this name. Today, the terms hasidut and hasid generally connote Hasidic philosophy and the followers of the Hasidic movement.

== Background ==
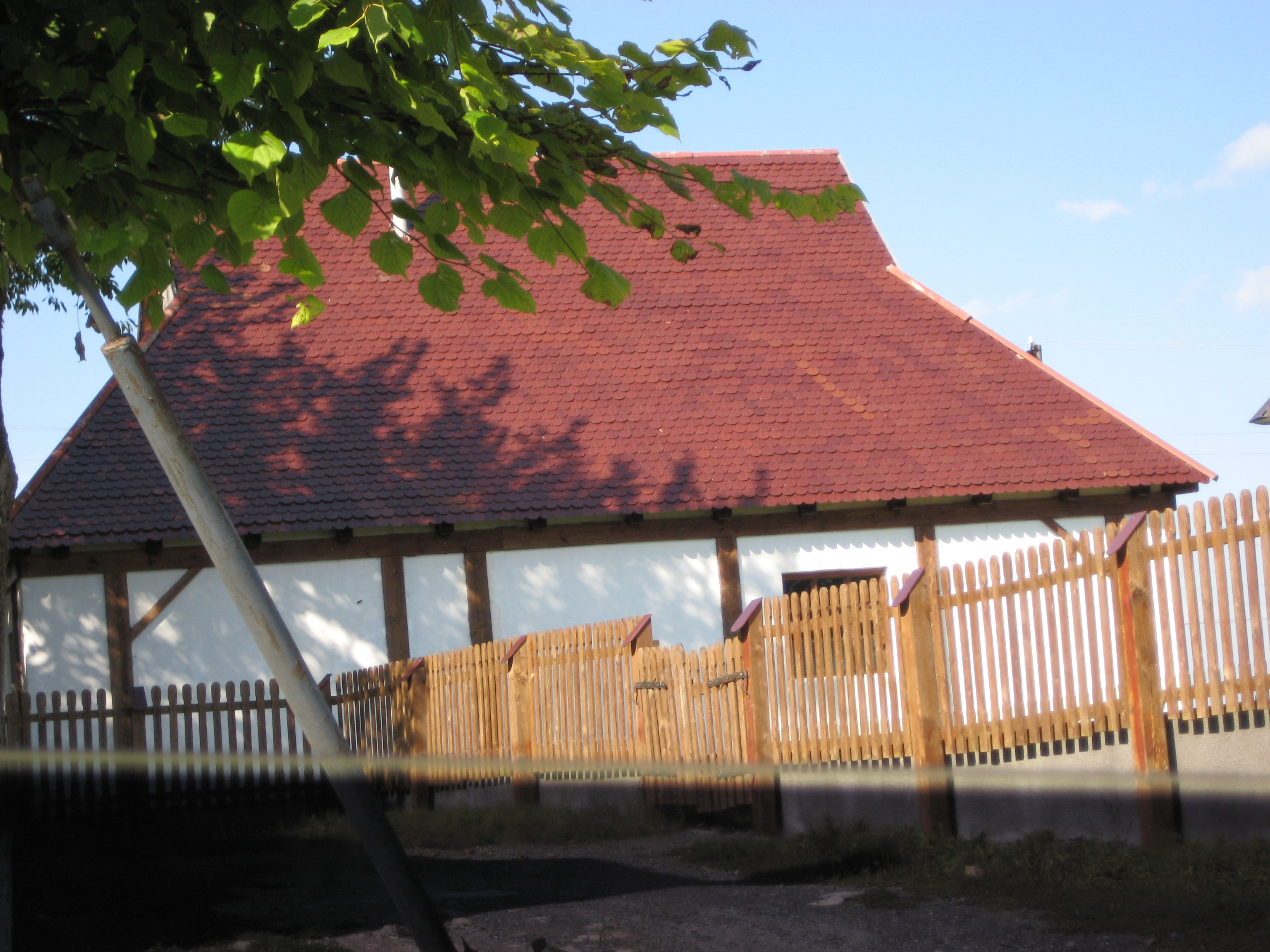
Rebuilt synagogue of the Baal Shem Tov in Medzhybizh, Ukraine

Hasidic philosophy begins with the teachings of Yisroel ben Eliezer known as the Baal Shem Tov and his successors (most notably Dov Ber the Maggid of Mezeritch and his students). These teachings consist of new interpretations of Judaism, but are especially built upon the Jewish mystical tradition, the Kabbalah. While the Jewish mystical tradition had long been reserved for a scholarly elite, Hasidic teachings are unique in their popular access, being aimed at the masses. Hasidism is thought to be a union of three different currents in Judaism: 1) Jewish law or halacha; 2) Jewish legend and saying, the aggadah; and 3) Jewish mysticism, the Kabbalah. Hasidic teachings, often termed exegesis, are seen as having a similar method to that of the Midrash (the rabbinic homiletic literature). Hasidic exegesis differs from Kabbalistic schools as it focuses somewhat less on the sefirot and partzufim and more on binary types of oppositions (e.g. body and soul). On the other hand, Louis Jacobs stated that Hasidic teachings should not be described as exegesis as during the course of interpretation texts are taken completely out of context to yield desired conclusions, grammar and syntax are ignored, and ideas are read into the texts that they cannot possibly mean.

The teachings of the Baal Shem Tov are founded on two key ideas: 1) religious pantheism (or panentheism), or the omnipresence of God, and 2) the idea of communion between God and man. The doctrines of the Baal Shem Tov include the teaching of the individual's duty to serve God in every aspect of his or her daily life, the concept of divine providence as extending to every individual and even to each particular in the inanimate world, the doctrine of Continuous Creation that the true reality of all things is the "word" of God brought all things into being and continuously keeps them in existence.

In line with the Kabbalah, the Baal Shem Tov taught that the end of worship of God is attachment to God (devekut), which primarily is the service of the heart rather than the mind. The Baal Shem Tov emphasized the rabbinic teaching "God desires the heart" as the obligation of intention of the heart (kavanah) in the fulfilment of the mitzvot. Where the Baal Shem Tov departs from Kabbalah is his notion that devekut may be attained through even the sincere recitation of prayers and psalms.

== Hasidic schools of thought ==
Some Hasidic "courts", and not a few individual prominent masters, developed distinct philosophies with particular accentuation of various themes in the movement's general teachings. Several of these Hasidic schools had lasting influence over many dynasties, while others died with their proponents. In the doctrinal sphere, the dynasties may be divided along many lines. Some are characterized by rebbes who are predominantly Torah scholars and decisors, deriving their authority much like ordinary non-Hasidic rabbis do. Such "courts" place great emphasis on strict observance and study, and are among the most meticulous in the Orthodox world in practice. Prominent examples are the House of Sanz and its scions, such as Satmar, or Belz. Other sects, like Vizhnitz, espouse a charismatic-populist line, centered on the admiration of the masses for the Righteous, his effervescent style of prayer and conduct and his purported miracle-working capabilities. Fewer still retain a high proportion of the mystical-spiritualist themes of early Hasidism, and encourage members to study much kabbalistic literature and (carefully) engage in the field. The various Ziditchover dynasties mostly adhere to this philosophy. Others still focus on contemplation and achieving inner perfection. No dynasty is wholly devoted to a single approach of the above, and all offer some combination with differing emphasis on each of those.

Hasidism does not constitute a united movement, but a host of Hasidic dynasties, united by self-understanding of common descent or evolution from the original mystical inspiration of the Baal Shem Tov. Subsequent developments of Jewish history in Eastern Europe, particularly the perceived external secularising threats of Haskalah, assimilation, and late 19th century Jewish political movements like Zionism, added additional political and social views to their theologies, drawn from general Talmudic Judaism, in common reaction with their original traditionalist Rabbinic opponents, the Mitnagdim. However, the Hasidic movement can be divided into major groups and schools in its internal spirituality relationship to Hasidic Jewish mystical thought.

The first two works of Hasidic thought published (Toldot Yaakov Yosef (1780), by Jacob Joseph of Polnoye, and Magid Devarav L'Yaakov (1781), by Dov Ber of Mezeritch, compiled by Shlomo of Lutzk) represent the foundational thought of the Baal Shem Tov, and his successor the Maggid of Mezeritch, who lived before Hasidism became a mass movement. Dov Ber of Mezeritch, the last unifying leader of most of the early elite movement, was the movement's first systematic thinker and architect, who cultivating a stellar Hevrah Kadisha (Holy Group) of disciples who would go on to disseminate Hasidic spirituality to different areas of Eastern Europe among the common masses, beginning the innovation of Hasidism's varying schools of thought.

=== Popular Tzadikism ===
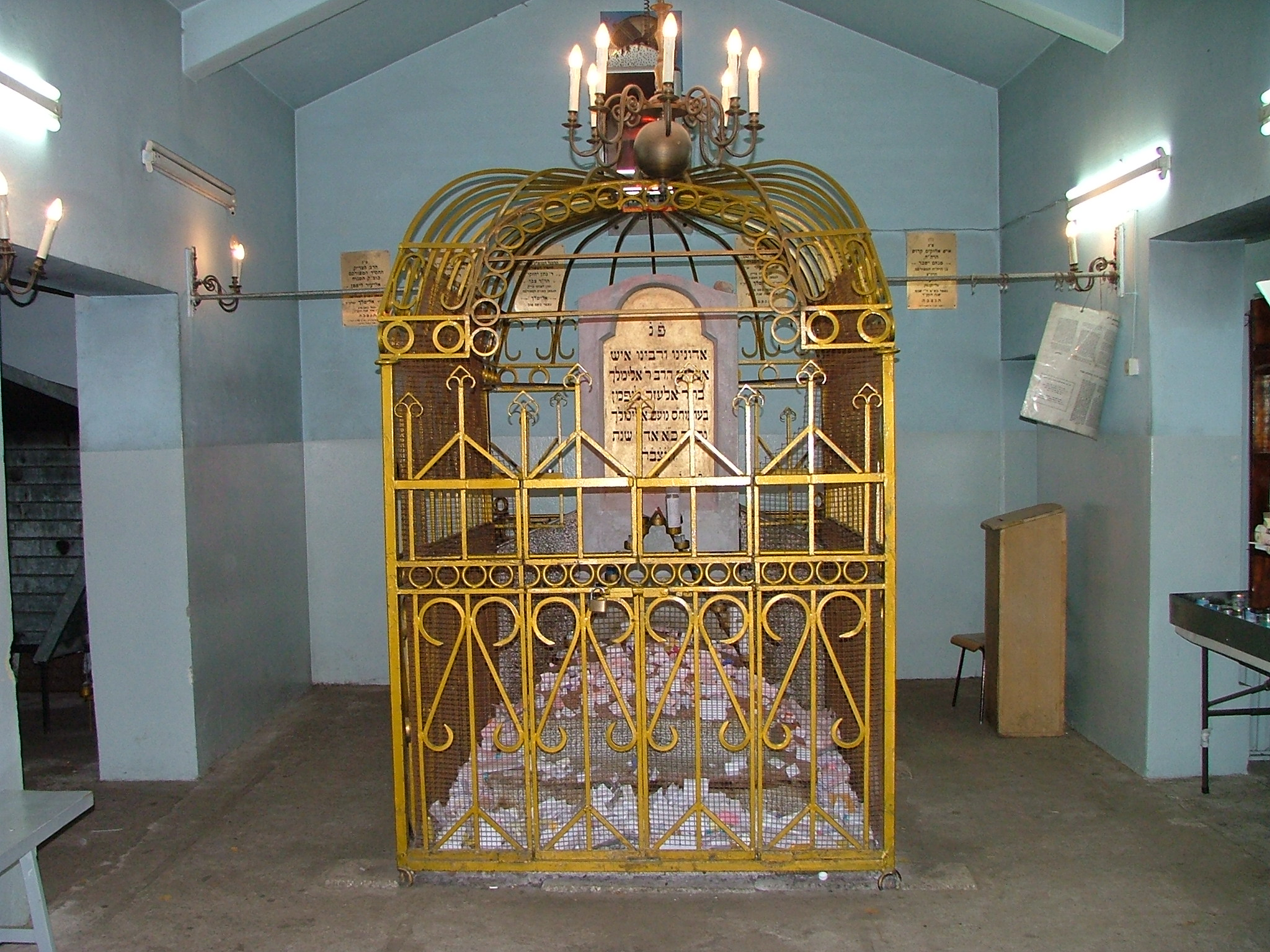
Grave of Elimelech of Lizhensk, leading disseminator of Hasidism in Poland-Galicia

Among the disciples of the Maggid of Mezeritch, Elimelech of Lizhensk (1717–1787), who founded Hasidism in Poland-Galicia, wrote the early Hasidic classic work Noam Elimelech (1788), which developed the role of the Hasidic Tzadik into a full training of charismatic theurgic mystical "Popular/Practical Tzadikism". The work so cultivated the innovative social mysticism of leadership that it led to the proliferation of new Hasidic Tzadikim among leading disciples in Galicia and Poland. This populist "Mainstream Hasidism" praised the role of the elite tzadik in extreme formulations, which incurred the censorship of the Mitnagdim. The tzadik was depicted as the divine foundation of existence, whose task was to draw and elevate the common Jewish masses by charismatic appeal and theurgic intercession. He cultivated their faith and emotional deveikut to the divinity that the Tzadik represented on the material plane, as a collective of the divine sparks in each person's soul. Disciples who became the subsequent popular tzadikim leaders of Polish Hasidism include the Chozeh (Seer) of Lublin, the Maggid of Koznitz and Menachem Mendel of Rimanov.

=== Peshischa ===
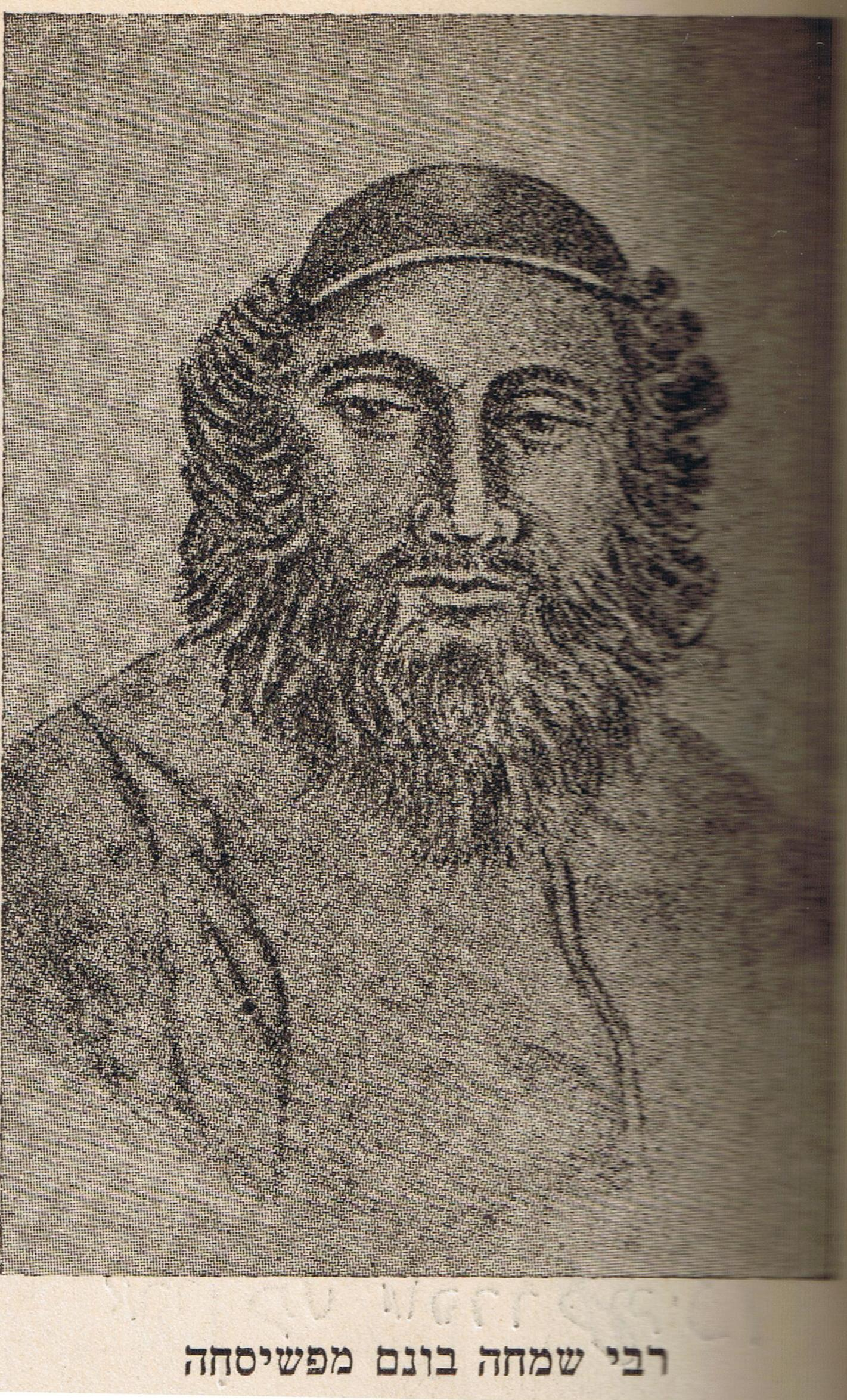
Simcha Bunim of Peshischa, successor to The Holy Jew, who continued the Peshischa School of Hasidism

In 1812, a schism occurred between the Seer of Lublin and his prime disciple, the Holy Jew of Przysucha (Peshischa in Yiddish), due to both personal and doctrinal disagreements. The Seer adopted a populist approach, centered on the Righteous' theurgical functions to draw the masses. He was famous for his lavish, enthusiastic conduct during prayer and worship, and extremely charismatic demeanour. He stressed that as tzaddiq, his mission was to influence the common folk by absorbing Divine Light and satisfying their material needs, thus converting them to his cause and elating them. The Holy Jew pursued a more introspective course, maintaining that the rebbes duty was to serve as a spiritual mentor for a more elitist group, helping them to achieve a senseless state of contemplation, aiming to restore man to his oneness with God which Adam supposedly lost when he ate the fruit of the Tree of Knowledge. The Holy Jew and his successors did neither repudiate miracle working, nor did they eschew dramatic conduct; but they were much more restrained in general. The Peshischa School became dominant in Central Poland, while populist Hasidism resembling the Lublin ethos often prevailed in Galicia. One extreme and renowned philosopher who emerged from the Peshischa School was Menachem Mendel of Kotzk. Adopting an elitist, hard-line attitude, he openly denounced the folkly nature of other tzaddiqim, and rejected financial support. Gathering a small group of devout scholars who sought to attain spiritual perfection, whom he often berated and mocked, he always stressed the importance of both somberness and totality, stating it was better to be fully wicked than only somewhat good.

=== Chabad ===
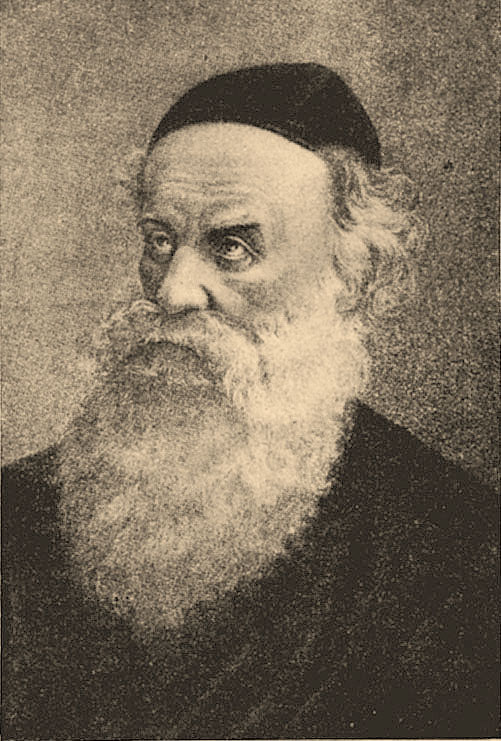
Shneur Zalman of Liadi, founder of Chabad

The Chabad school, also called Lubavitch after the village in White Russia where it subsequently settled, was founded by Shneur Zalman of Liadi from among the circle of Dov Ber of Mezeritch, and was elaborated over 7 generations by his successors until the late 20th century. Chabad was originally the more inclusive term, as it also generated a number of short lived offshoots, but hereditary dynasticism defined the main branch, which became publicly prominent for its outreach to the wider Jewish world under the post-war leadership of the last Lubavitcher Rebbe. The term Chabad, an acronym for the intellectual sephirot powers of the soul, defines the thought of the movement, which emphasises the role of inward intellectual and psychological contemplation of Hasidic mysticism, in contrast to mainstream Hasidic emotionalist faith and fervour. Chabad Rebbes, while not eschewing charismatic authority, emphasises their role as teachers and guides for the own internal work at divine contemplation of their followers. Chabad is an offshoot of Hasidism and a movement of its own, characterised by its own successively articulated orientations, and with its own extensive writings that are typified by the systematic nature of their thought, with their own conceptual language.

Chabad is described in scholarship as the intellectual or philosophical school in Hasidism. These comparisons are qualified, however, by considerations that Chabad thought is not rationalistic, as it builds its philosophical investigations of divinity upon Lurianic Kabbalah and other traditional Torah sources without independent reason from first principles; though incorporating Maimonidean and other medieval Jewish philosophy methods, most Chabad thought is presented in a Kabbalistic theosophical framework; its aim is inward mystical self-transformation applied to self-sacrifice in Jewish observance, not formal philosophical intellectualism; and Chabad thought retains mystical revelation as its infinite intuitive divine essence source, drawn down into successively greater intellectual understanding by each leader of Chabad. In Chabad thought, the Kabbalistic realm is mirrored in the internal life of man, so that it develops a conceptual spiritual psychology of human life. This enables the insights of mysticism, through Hitbonenut contemplation during prayer, to be translated into inward emotions and practical action, while forming a precise analogical understanding for philosophical articulation of divinity. Chabad theology translates the esoteric symbols of Kabbalah into dialectical terms that intellectually study divinity through internal human psychological experience. The ultimate paradox contemplated in meditative Chabad prayer is its acosmic panentheism that leads to Bittul self-nullification and inward Hitpa'alut ecstasy. While each Chabad leader developed and deepened these contemplative themes, the thought of the last Rebbe treated Hasidic thought not as a self-contained mystical study, but much more widely as the inner unifying divine essence of all parts of Torah, expressed in analytical talks that united the exoteric and esoteric, mystical and rational of Judaism, and emphasised the corresponding unity of the whole Jewish people. In the theology of Menachem Mendel Schneerson, the ultimate Divine essence, expressed through Hasidism's soul essence, is revealed in practical action and Jewish outreach that makes a messianic dwelling for God.

=== Breslov ===
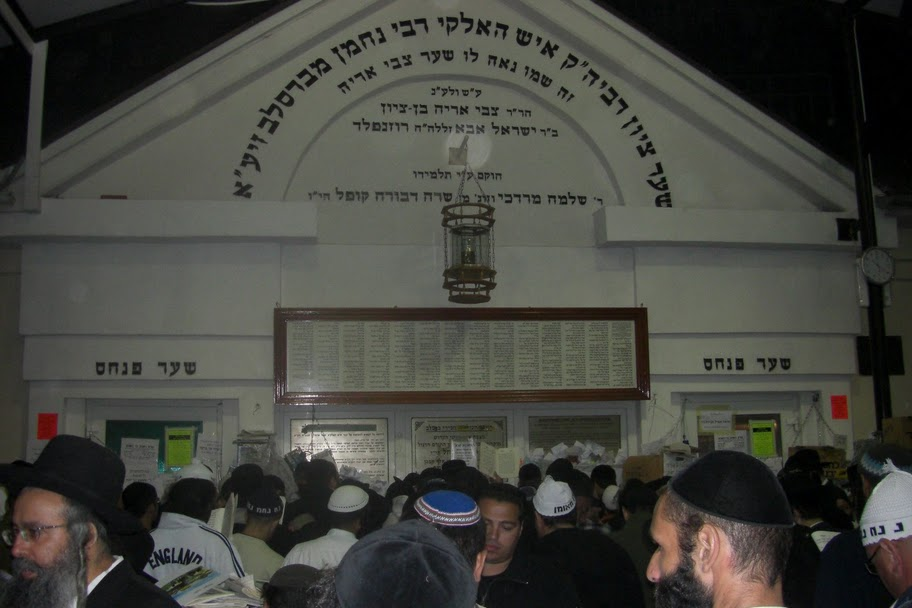
Pilgrims at Nachman of Breslov's tomb, Uman, Ukraine

Another school of Hasidic thought, distinct from mainstream Hasidism, was formulated by Nachman of Breslov (or Bratslav), a great-grandson of the Baal Shem Tov. His Breslov Hasidim continued to follow him without appointing a successor. Nachman said he was the true Tzadik of the generation who cleaves to God by prophetic perfection, and regarded himself as a new Kabbalistic revelation in succession to Isaac Luria and the Baal Shem Tov.

Nachman's personality and thought comprise the anti-rational pole of Hasidism, deriding the logical limitations of medieval Jewish philosophy to reach mystical union and the revelation of the Kabbalistic Divine "Nothingness" Absolute. Imagination occupies a central position, drawing from prophecy, and perfecting faith, new Torah revelation, melody, joy, laughter, simplicity, and personal secluded prayer, by casting away the rational mind. Actions of "smallness" (foolish madness) nullify the ego, and relate to the folly of material existence, and the comic playfulness of Judaic observance, which like the world becomes only real and Divinely meaningful with the longing and cleaving to God of deveikut mysticism. Within Hasidism's paradox of Divine Immanence versus worldly reality, Nachman portrayed the existential world in grim colors, as a place devoid of God's perceived presence, which the soul transcends in mystical yearning. He mocked attempts to perceive the nature of infinite-finite dialectics and the manner in which God still occupies the Vacant Void of Creation albeit not, stating these were paradoxical, beyond human understanding. Cleaving to the one true Tzadik who reaches above the void, simple faith, silence and melody confront the inevitable heresies of pre-Messianic finite reality. Mortals were in constant struggle to overcome their profane instincts, and had to free themselves from their limited intellects to see the world as it truly is. Recent scholarship has rejected earlier academic constructions of Rabbi Nachman's thought as an existentialist Hasidism of faith, versus the general movement's Hasidism of mysticism, establishing the dialectic ladder of mystical union (a mysticism of faith) that Breslovian faith communicates

=== The mystical borders of antinomianism ===
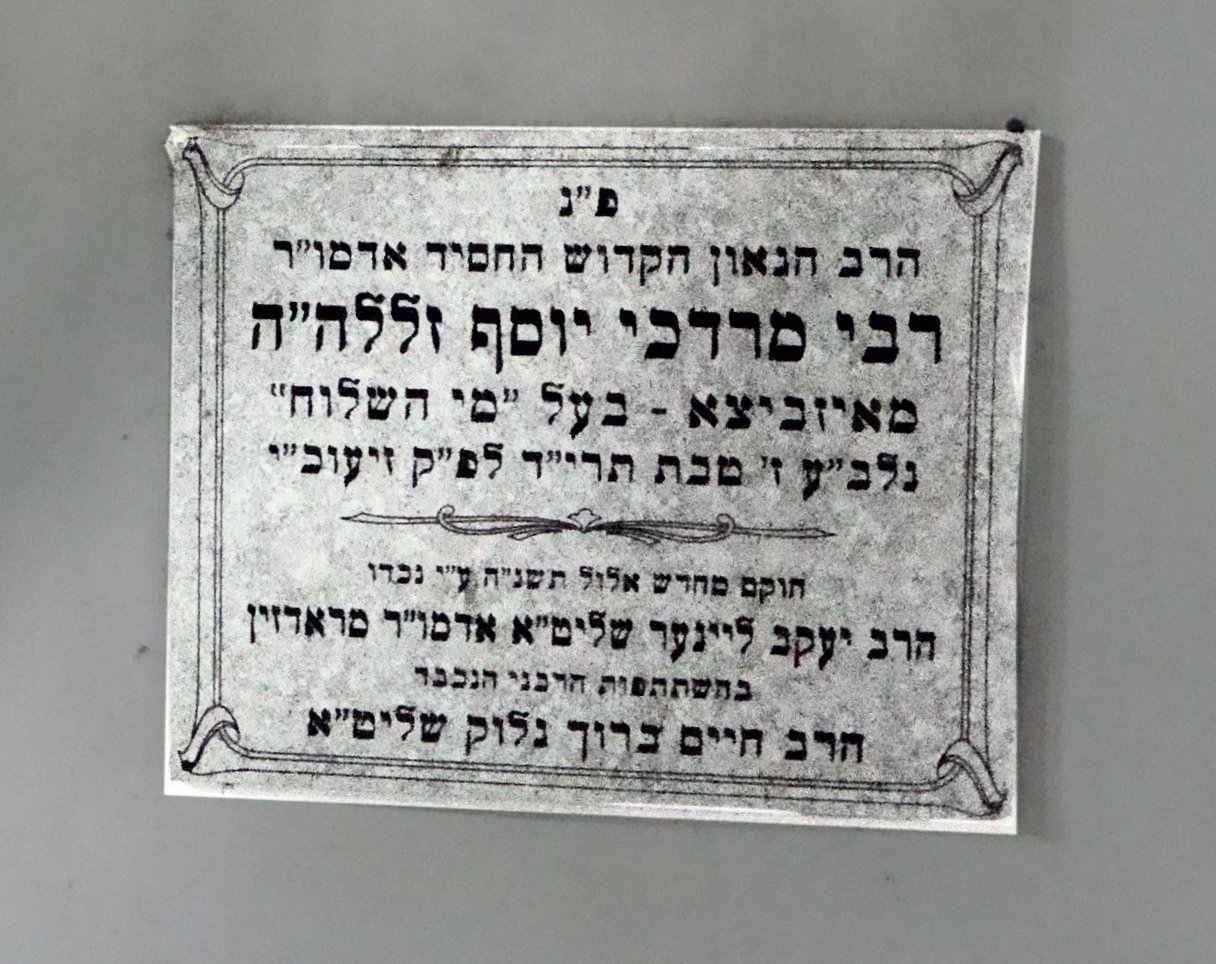
Plaque on the mausoleum of Mordechai Yosef Leiner of Ishbitz, author of the antinomian Mei Hashiloach

An antinomian strain relating to the conduct of the tzadik exists in the writings of the Seer of Lublin, which were personal notes published posthumously. For the Seer, the masses must obey halakha (revealed Divine Will) with awe. The task of the tzadik is to cleave to God in love, whose charismatic glow shines to the masses. The Tzadik's ecstatic abilities uncover a prophetic hidden Divine Will of ever new revelation, that can suspend the legislated former revelation of halakha for the sake of Heaven.

== Key concepts ==
=== God's immanence ===
The most fundamental theme underlying all Hasidic theory is the immanence of God in the universe, often expressed in a phrase from the Tikunei haZohar, "Leit Atar panuy mi-néya" (Aramaic: "no site is devoid of it"). Derived from Lurianic discourse, but greatly expanded in the Hasidic one, this panentheistic concept implies that literally all of creation is suffused with divinity. In the beginning, God had to contract (Tzimtzum) His omnipresence or infinity, the Ein Sof. Thus, a Vacant Void (Khalal panui) was created, bereft from obvious presence, and therefore able to entertain free will, contradictions and other phenomena seemingly separate from God Himself, which would have been impossible within His original, perfect existence. Yet, the very reality of the world which was created therein is entirely dependent on its divine origin. Matter would have been null and void without the true, spiritual essence it possesses. Just the same, the infinite Ein Sof cannot manifest in the Vacant Void, and must limit itself in the guise of measurable corporeality that may be perceived.

Thus, there is a dualism between the true aspect of everything and the physical side, false, but ineluctable, with each evolving into the other: as God must compress and disguise Himself, so must humans and matter in general ascend and reunite with the omnipresence. Elior quoted Shneur Zalman of Liadi, in his commentary Torah Or on Genesis 28:21, who wrote that "this is the purpose of Creation, from Infinity to Finitude, so it may be reversed from the state of Finite to that of Infinity". Kabbalah stressed the importance of this dialectic, but mainly (though not exclusively) evoked it in cosmic terms, referring for example to the manner in which God progressively diminished Himself into the world through the various dimensions, or Sefirot. Hasidism applied it also to the most mundane details of human existence. All Hasidic schools devoted a prominent place in their teaching, with differing accentuation, to the interchanging nature of Ein, both infinite and imperceptible, becoming Yesh, "Existent" – and vice versa. They used the concept as a prism to gauge the world, and the needs of the spirit in particular. Rachel Elior noted: "reality lost its static nature and permanent value, now measured by a new standard, seeking to expose the Godly, boundless essence, manifest in its tangible, circumscribed opposite."

Closely linked with the former is Bitul ha-Yesh, "Negation of the Existent", or of the "Corporeal". Hasidism teaches that while a superficial observance of the universe by the "eyes of the flesh" (Einei ha-Basar) purportedly reflects the reality of all things profane and worldly, a true devotee must transcend this illusory façade and realize that there is nothing but God. It is not only a matter of perception, but very practical, for it entails also abandoning material concerns and cleaving only to the true, spiritual ones, oblivious to the surrounding false distractions of life. The practitioner's success in detaching from his sense of person, and conceive himself as Ein (in the double meaning of 'naught' and 'infinite'), is regarded as the highest state of elation in Hasidism. The true divine essence of man – the soul – may then ascend and return to the upper realm, where it does not possess an existence independent from God. This ideal is termed Hitpashtut ha-Gashmi'yut, "the expansion (or removal) of corporeality". It is the dialectic opposite of God's contraction into the world.

Hasidic masters exhorted their followers to "negate themselves", paying as little heed as they could for worldly concerns, and thus, to clear the way for this transformation. The struggle and doubt of being torn between the belief in God's immanence and the very real sensual experience of the indifferent world is a key theme in the movement's literature. Many tracts have been devoted to the subject, acknowledging that the "callous and rude" flesh hinders one from holding fast to the ideal, and these shortcomings are extremely hard to overcome even in the purely intellectual level, a fortiori in actual life.

The complementary opposite of corporeal worship, or the elation of the finite into infinite, is the concept of Hamshacha, "drawing down" or "absorbing", and specifically, Hamschat ha-Shefa, "absorption of effluence". During spiritual ascension, one could siphon the power animating the higher dimensions down into the material world, where it would manifest as benevolent influence of all kinds. These included spiritual enlightenment, zest in worship and other high-minded aims, but also the more prosaic health and healing, deliverance from various troubles and simple economic prosperity. Thus, a very tangible and alluring motivation to become followers emerged. Both corporeal worship and absorption allowed the masses to access, with common actions, a religious experience once deemed esoteric.

Yet another reflection of the Ein-Yesh dialectic is pronounced in the transformation of evil to goodness and the relations between these two poles and other contradicting elements – including various traits and emotions of the human psyche, like pride and humility, purity and profanity, et cetera. Hasidic thinkers argued that in order to redeem the sparks hidden, one had to associate not merely with the corporeal, but with sin and evil. One example is the elevation of impure thoughts during prayer, transforming them to noble ones rather than repressing them, advocated mainly in the early days of the sect; or "breaking" oneself's character by directly confronting profane inclinations. This aspect, once more, had sharp antinomian implications was and used by the Sabbateans to justify excessive sinning. It was mostly toned down in late Hasidism, and even before that leaders were careful to stress that it was not exercised in the physical sense, but in the contemplative, spiritual one. This kabbalistic notion, too, was not unique to the movement and appeared frequently among other Jewish groups.

=== The Tzadik ===
While its mystical and ethical teachings are not easily sharply distinguished from those of other Jewish currents, the defining doctrine of Hasidism is that of the saintly leader, serving both as an ideal inspiration and an institutional figure around whom followers are organized. In the movement's sacral literature, this person is referred to as the Tzaddiq, the Righteous One — often also known by the general honorific Admor (acronym of Hebrew for "our master, teacher and Rabbi"), granted to rabbis in general, or colloquially as rebbe. The idea that, in every generation, there are righteous persons through whom the divine effluence is drawn to the material world is rooted in the kabbalistic thought, which also claims that one of them is supreme, the reincarnation of Moses. Hasidism elaborated the notion of the Tzaddiq into the basis of its entire system – so much that the very term gained an independent meaning within it, apart from the original which denoted God-fearing, highly observant people.

When the sect began to attract following and expanded from a small circle of learned disciples to a mass movement, it became evident that its complex philosophy could be imparted only partially to the new rank and file. As even intellectuals struggled with the sublime dialectics of infinity and corporeality, there was little hope to have the common folk truly internalize these, not as mere abstractions to pay lip service to. Ideologues exhorted them to have faith, but the true answer, which marked their rise as a distinct sect, was the concept of the Tzaddiq. A Hasidic master was to serve as a living embodiment of the recondite teachings. He was able to transcend matter, gain spiritual communion, Worship through Corporeality and fulfill all the theoretical ideals. As the vast majority of his flock could not do so themselves, they were to cleave to him instead, acquiring at least some semblance of those vicariously. His commanding and often — especially in the early generations — charismatic presence was to reassure the faithful and demonstrate the truth in Hasidic philosophy by countering doubts and despair. But more than spiritual welfare was concerned: Since it was believed he could ascend to the higher realms, the leader was able to harvest effluence and bring it down upon his adherents, providing them with very material benefits. "The crystallization of that theurgical phase", noted Glenn Dynner, "marked Hasidism's evolution into a full-fledged social movement."

In Hasidic discourse, the willingness of the leader to sacrifice the ecstasy and fulfillment of unity in God was deemed a heavy sacrifice undertook for the benefit of the congregation. His followers were to sustain and especially to obey him, as he possessed superior knowledge and insight gained through communion. The "descent of the Righteous" (Yeridat ha-Tzaddiq) into the matters of the world was depicted as identical with the need to save the sinners and redeem the sparks concealed in the most lowly places. Such a link between his functions as communal leader and spiritual guide legitimized the political power he wielded. It also prevented a retreat of Hasidic masters into hermitism and passivity, as many mystics before them did. Their worldly authority was perceived as part of their long-term mission to elevate the corporeal world back into divine infinity. To a certain extent, the Saint even fulfilled for his congregation, and for it alone, a limited Messianic capacity in his lifetime. After the Sabbatean debacle, this moderate approach provided a safe outlet for the eschatological urges. At least two leaders radicalized in this sphere and caused severe controversy: Nachman of Breslov, who declared himself the only true Tzaddiq, and Menachem Mendel Schneerson, whom many of his followers believed to be the Messiah. The rebbes were subject to intense hagiography, even subtly compared with Biblical figures by employing prefiguration. It was argued that since followers could not "negate themselves" sufficiently to transcend matter, they should instead "negate themselves" in submission to the Saint (hitbatlut la-Tzaddiq), thus bonding with him and enabling themselves to access what he achieved in terms of spirituality. The Righteous served as a mystical bridge, drawing down effluence and elevating the prayers and petitions of his admirers.

The Saintly forged a well-defined relationship with the masses: they provided the latter with inspiration, were consulted in all matters, and were expected to intercede on behalf of their adherents with God and ensure they gained financial prosperity, health and male offspring. The pattern still characterizes Hasidic sects, though prolonged routinization in many turned the rebbes into de facto political leaders of strong, institutionalized communities. The role of a Saint was obtained by charisma, erudition and appeal in the early days of Hasidism. But by the dawn of the 19th century, the Righteous began to claim legitimacy by descent to the masters of the past, arguing that since they linked matter with infinity, their abilities had to be associated with their own corporeal body. Therefore, it was accepted "there can be no Tzaddiq but the son of a Tzaddiq". Virtually all modern sects maintain this hereditary principle. For example, the rebbes' families maintain endogamy and marry almost solely with scions of other dynasties.

=== Other concepts ===
- Devekut (Hebrew: דביקות - "cleaving") – The "attachment" or "adherence" to God is a state of worship which goes beyond ecstasy (hitlahavut). Devekut is described as the state of self-transcendence into the divine. It is understood to be the highest goal of Jewish mystical striving. Some scholars have maintained that Hasidism is distinguished by its insistence that the starting point of religious life is complete adhesion to and communion with God. According to Gershom Scholem, the originality of Hasidism lies in the fact that the mystics of the movement did not simply cherish their attainment of devekut but undertook to teach its secrets to all. In Hasidism, devekut is an ideal to be striven for by both the saintly as well as the average Jew, though hasidic thinkers generally add that it is only the saint who can maintain a life of devekut and that his followers can be led to its approximation only through their attachment to the saintly man. Hasidism uses devekut in a more casual and general way, instructing its followers to seek a life of devekut where one's mind is always concentrating on God. Techniques for this purpose were inherited from the Kabbalah, including meditation on the four lettered name of God (Y-H-V-H).
- Hispashtut hagashmiut (Hebrew: התפשטות הגשמיות "divestment of corporeality") – This is understood as a spiritual practice where one regards his or her body as being ina state of union with the rest of the world. Hitpashtut hagashmiut is the stripping-away of materialism, allowing one to abolish his or her own selfhood (yesh), becoming a part of the divine will. Hitpashtut hagashmiut occurs during the height of the devekut experience, where the Hasid is able to dissolve the forces of the ego, making it possible for the soul to be reunited with its divine source.
- Simcha (Hebrew: שִׂמְחָה - "joy") – Joy is considered an essential element of the Hasidic way of life. In the early stages of the Hasidic movement, before the name "Hasidim" was coined, one of the names used to refer to the followers of the new movement was di Freyliche (Yiddish: די פרייליכע), “the Happy”. Aharon of Karlin (I), one of the early Hasidic masters, reportedly said, "There is no mitzvah to be joyous, but joy can bring on the greatest mitzvot." It is also true, he said, that "it is not a sin to be sad, but sadness can bring on the greatest sins."

== Writings ==
=== Parables ===
Hasidism often uses parables to reflect on mystical teachings. For example, the well-known parable of the "Prince and the Imaginary Walls" reflects a pantheistic or acosmistic theology and explores the relationship between the individual Jew and God.

How, then, can those who are distant from Torah be aroused from their spiritual slumber? For such people, the Torah must be clothed and concealed in stories. They must hear narratives of ancient times, which go beyond simple kindness and are "great in kindness".

— Nachman of Breslov

Nachman of Breslov authored a number of well-known tales, or expanded parables. Nachman believed he drew these "tales of the ancient wisdom" from a higher wisdom, tapping into a deep archetypal imagination. One such tale is The Rooster Prince, a story of a prince who goes insane and believes that he is a rooster.

=== Early Hasidic works ===
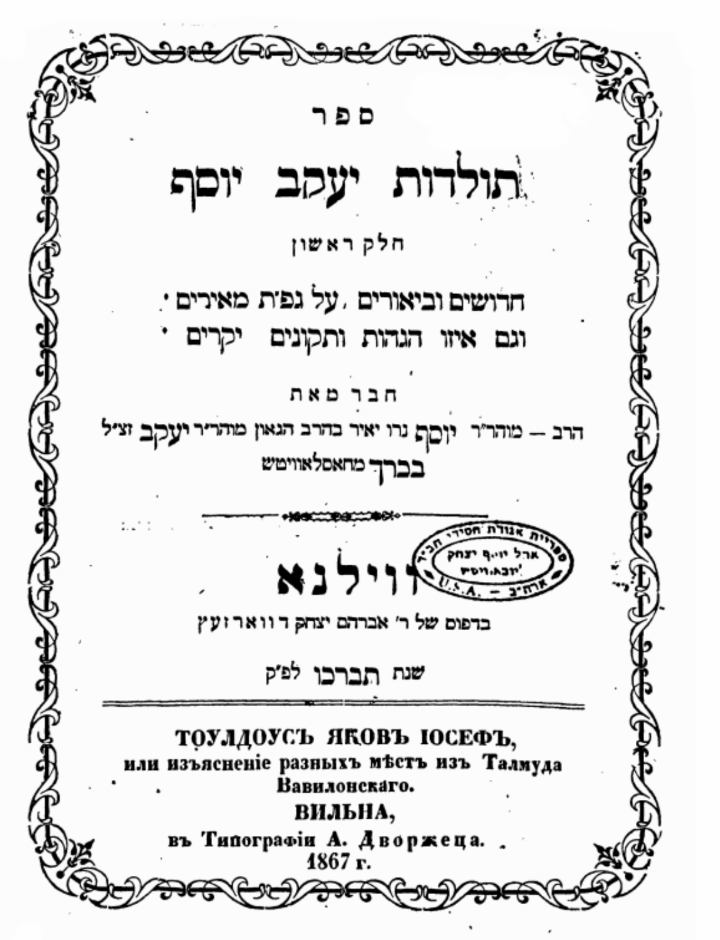
Title page of Toldot Yaakov Yosef, 1867 edition. This work was the first published Hasidic text.

While the Baal Shem Tov did not leave teachings in writing, many teachings, sayings and parables are recorded by his students, most notably in the Toldot Yaakov Yosef by Jacob Josef of Polonne, a disciple of the Baal Shem Tov. The teachings of the Baal Shem Tov's successor, Dov Ber the Maggid of Mezritch, were compiled in the work Maggid D'varav L'yaakov (compiled by Shlomo Lusk). Many of the Hasidic leaders of the third generation of Hasidism (students of Dov Ber) authored their own works, which are the basis for new Hasidic schools of thought. Among them are Elimelech of Lizhensk, who further developed the Hasidic doctrine of the Tzaddik (mystical leader) that gave rise to many Polish Hasidic dynasties, also notable are the teachings of his brother Zushya of Anipoli and Levi Yitzchok of Berditchev, known in Hasidic legend as the defender of the people before the Heavenly Court. Shneur Zalman of Liadi initiated the Chabad school of intellectual Hasidism. Others include Nachman of Breslav known for his use of imaginative parables, and Menachem Mendel of Kotzk.

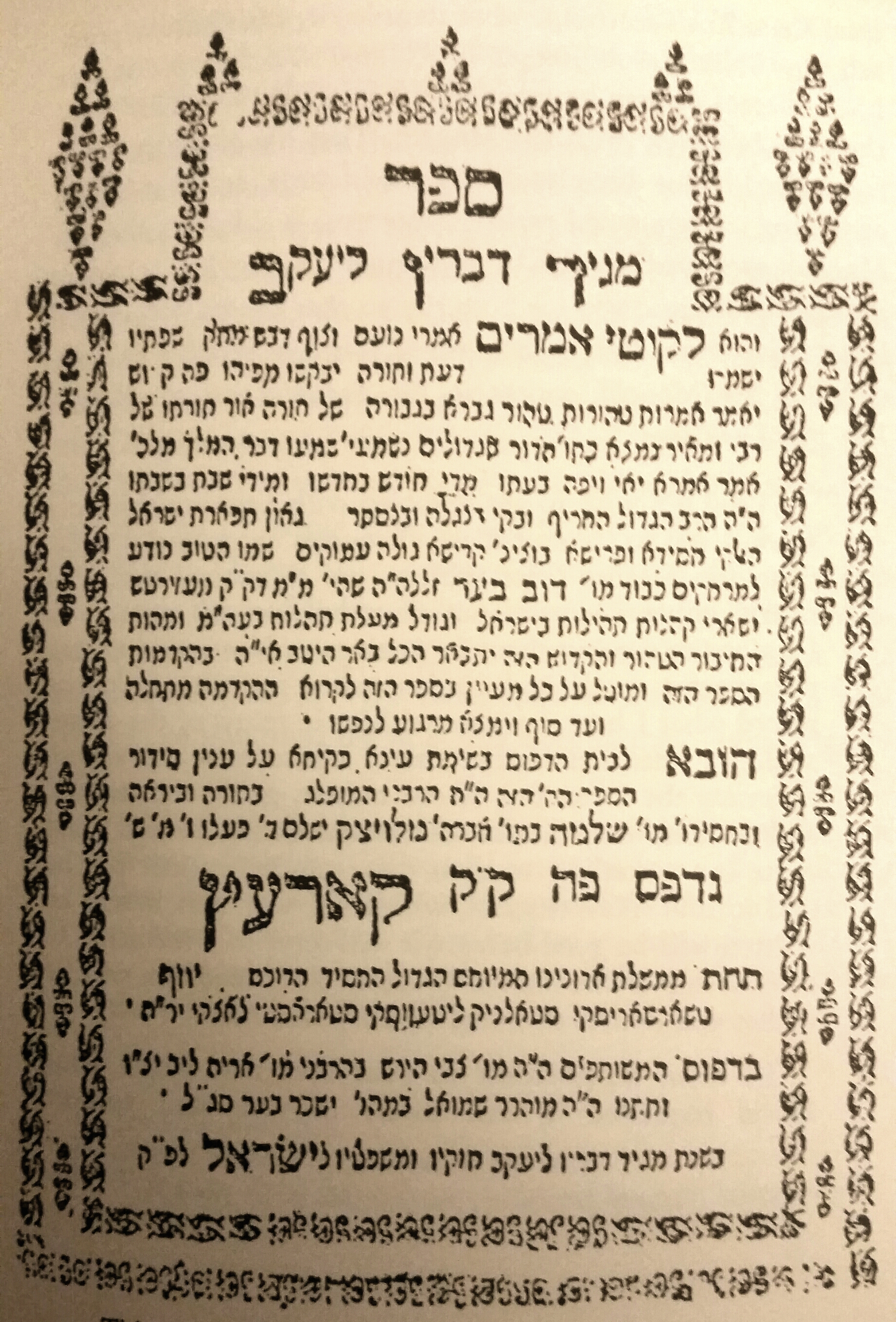
Title page of Maggid Devarav L'Yaakov (Koretz, 1781 edition).

Among the major tracts compiled by early Hasidic masters are:

- Toldot Yaakov Yosef, by Jacob Joseph of Polnoye (1780)
- Magid Devarav L'Yaakov, by Dovber of Mezritch, compiled by Shlomo of Lutzk (1781)
- Noam Elimelech, by Elimelech of Lizhensk (1788)
- Likutei Amarim (Tanya), by Shneur Zalman of Liadi (1796)
- Kedushas Levi, by Levi Yitzchok of Berditchev (1798)
- Meor Einayim, by Menachem Nachum Twerski of Chernobyl (1798)
- Likutei Moharan, by Nachman of Breslov (1808)
- Siduro Shel Shabbos, by Hayyim Tyrer (1813)
- Sippurei Ma'asiot by Nachman of Breslov (1816) - a book of parables reflecting mystical concepts

== In Jewish scholarship ==
The lengthy history of Hasidism, the numerous schools of thought therein, and particularly its use of the traditional medium of homiletic literature and sermons – comprising numerous references to earlier sources in the Pentateuch, Talmud and exegesis as a means to grounding oneself in tradition – as the almost sole channel to convey its ideas, all made the isolation of a common doctrine highly challenging to researchers. As noted by Joseph Dan, "every attempt to present such a body of ideas has failed." Even motifs presented by scholars in the past as unique Hasidic contributions were later revealed to have been common among both their predecessors and opponents, all the more so regarding many other traits that are widely extant – these play, Dan added, "a prominent role in modern non-Hasidic and anti-Hasidic writings as well". The difficulty of separating the movement's philosophy from that of its main inspiration, Lurianic Kabbalah, and determining what was novel and what merely a recapitulation, also baffled historians. Some, like Louis Jacobs, regarded the early masters as innovators who introduced "much that was new if only by emphasis"; others, primarily Mendel Piekarz, argued to the contrary that but a little was not found in much earlier tracts, and the movement's originality lay in the manner it popularized these teachings to become the ideology of a well-organized sect.

Among the traits particularly associated with Hasidism in common understanding which are in fact widespread, is the importance of joy and happiness at worship and religious life – though the sect undoubtedly stressed this aspect and still possesses a clear populist bent. Another example is the value placed on the simple, ordinary Jew in supposed contradiction with the favouring of elitist scholars beforehand; such ideas are common in ethical works far preceding Hasidism. The movement did for a few decades challenge the rabbinic establishment, which relied on the authority of Torah acumen, but affirmed the centrality of study very soon. Concurrently, the image of its Opponents as dreary intellectuals who lacked spiritual fervour and opposed mysticism is likewise unfounded. Neither did Hasidism, often portrayed as promoting healthy sensuality, unanimously reject the asceticism and self-mortification associated primarily with its rivals. Joseph Dan ascribed all these perceptions to so-called "Neo-Hasidic" writers and thinkers, like Martin Buber. In their attempt to build new models of spirituality for modern Jews, they propagated a romantic, sentimental image of the movement. The "Neo-Hasidic" interpretation influenced even scholarly discourse to a great degree, but had a tenuous connection with reality.

A further complication is the divide between what researchers term "early Hasidism", which ended in the early 1800s, and established Hasidism since then onwards. While the former was a highly dynamic religious revival movement, the latter phase is characterized by consolidation into sects with hereditary leadership. The mystical teachings formulated during the first era were by no means repudiated, and many Hasidic masters remained consummate spiritualists and original thinkers; as noted by Benjamin Brown, Buber's once commonly accepted view that the routinization constituted "decadence" was refuted by later studies, demonstrating that the movement remained very much innovative. Yet many aspects of early Hasidism were indeed de-emphasized in favour of more conventional religious expressions, and its radical concepts were largely neutralized. Some rebbes adopted a relatively rationalist bent, sidelining their explicit mystical, theurgical roles, and many others functioned almost solely as political leaders of large communities. As to their Hasidim, affiliation was less a matter of admiring a charismatic leader as in the early days, but rather birth into a family belonging to a specific "court".

== Impact ==
Hasidic tradition and thought is also influential outside its immediate following, and outside Orthodox Jewish belief, for its charismatic inspiration and kabbalistic insights.

Jewish existentialist philosopher Martin Buber spent five years in isolation studying Hasidic texts, having a profound impact on his later writing. Buber later brought Hasidism to the western world through his works on Hasidic tales.

The influential thought of Abraham Joshua Heschel, scion of Polish Hasidic dynasties and a major traditionalist theologian in 20th century modern Jewish existentialism, drew from Hasidism. His writings, including studies of Hasidic masters, and Neo-Hasidism, saw Hasidism as the classic expression of Aggadic tradition. Heschel held the Aggadah's theology, poetic exegesis and spirituality to be central to the meaning and history of Judaism.

Rajneesh was also influenced by Hasidism, and helped to extend popular awareness of the philosophy.

== See also ==
- Misnagdim
- Chabad philosophy
- Neo-Hasidism
- Yeshiva § Ethics, mysticism and philosophy

== Bibliography ==
- The Great Mission – The Life and Story of Rabbi Yisrael Baal Shem Tov, Compiler Eli Friedman, Translator Elchonon Lesches, Kehot Publication Society.
- The Great Maggid – The Life and Teachings of Rabbi DovBer of Mezhirech, Jacob Immanuel Schochet, Kehot Publication Society.
- The Hasidic Tale, Edited by Gedaliah Nigal, Translated by Edward Levin, The Littman Library of Jewish Civilization.
- The Hasidic Parable, Aryeh Wineman, Jewish Publication Society.
- The Religious Thought of Hasidism: Text and Commentary, Edited by Norman Lamm, Michael Scharf Publication Trust of Yeshiva University.
- Wrapped in a Holy Flame: Teachings and Tales of The Hasidic Masters, Zalman Schachter-Shalomi, Jossey-Bass.
- The Zaddik: The Doctrine of the Zaddik According to the Writings of Rabbi Yaakov Yosef of Polnoy, Samuel H. Dresner, Jason Aronson publishers.
- Communicating the Infinite: The Emergence of the Habad School, Naftali Loewenthal, University of Chicago Press.
- Tormented Master: The Life and Spiritual Quest of Rabbi Nahman of Bratslav, Arthur Green, Jewish Lights Publishing.
- A Passion for Truth, Abraham Joshua Heschel, Jewish Lights Publishing.
- Lubavitcher Rabbi's Memoirs: Tracing the Origins of the Chasidic Movement – vol.1,2, Yoseph Yitzchak Schneersohn, Translated by Nissan Mindel, Kehot Publication Society.
- The Earth is the Lord's: The Inner World of the Jew in Eastern Europe, Abraham Joshua Heschel, Jewish Lights Publishing.
- Rabbi Nachman's Stories, translated by Aryeh Kaplan, Breslov Research Institute publication.
- On the Essence of Chassidus, Menachem Mendel Schneerson, translated by Y.Greenberg and S.S.Handelman, Kehot Publication Society.
- Hasidism Reappraised, Edited by Ada Rapoport-Albert, Littman Library of Jewish Civilization.
- The Mystical Origins of Hasidism, Rachel Elior, Littman Library of Jewish Civilization.
- Hasidic Prayer, Louis Jacobs, Littman Library of Jewish Civilization.
