= Esh Kodesh (book) =

The book Esh Kodesh ("Holy Fire") is a collection of sermons by the Rebbe of Piaseczno, Rabbi Kalonymus Kalman Shapira, delivered to his followers in the Warsaw Ghetto during the Holocaust. This book serves as a unique Hasidic, theological-philosophical, and historical document.

== Book Title ==
The author originally referred to it "Innovations in Torah from the Years of Wrath 1939–1942", but it was published under the name "Esh Kodesh" in Israel, memorializing the Holocaust martyrs, including the Rebbe and his family who were murdered during the Holocaust. The phrase originates from the end of the fourth chapter of the author's magnum opus, Chovas Hatalmidim. The name Esh Kodesh ("Holy Fire") has been adopted for various Piaseczno Hasidic centers in Beit Shemesh and Bnei Brak, a yeshiva in Safed, a synagogue in New York, and the Esh Kodesh outpost in the Mateh Binyamin area.

== Structure of the Book ==
The structure of "Esh Kodesh" is typical of books by Hasidic leaders: a collection of sermons on the weekly Torah portions and holidays, arranged according to the calendar year. The book contains 86 sermons delivered over three years, 1939–1942. The first sermon was given on Rosh Hashanah 1939 (September 14), and the last on Shabbat Chazon, July 18, 1942, just days before the mass deportation to Treblinka began. Additionally, there are corrections and notes added by the Rebbe, presumably after the last sermon.

The sermons are not consecutive throughout the three years; there are periods of several weeks or months without any. In the year 1939–1940, the Rebbe gave 41 sermons; in 1940–1941, only 21; and in 1941–1942, 24 sermons, up to Shabbat Chazon, covering four out of the five Books of Moses.

The sermons typically begin with a question about the weekly Torah portion, referencing commentators or related Midrashim. Often, there is mention of Rashi's commentary and the Midrash, usually Midrash Rabbah. There are also many references to the Zohar and various Hasidic works, especially those written by his father.

== Content of the Book ==
As a Hasidic leader during the Holocaust, the Rebbe faced enormous theological and philosophical challenges. "Holy Fire" represents a unique attempt to offer Hasidic-thought responses to the difficulty: as a Rebbe and a thinker, he tries to justify the actions of the Creator, find a compromise for suffering, and imbue meaning in sanctifying God's name; as a leader, he tries to encourage his listeners and provide direction to his followers.

Rabbi Shapira describes the suffering he and his followers endured. His religious questions and attempts to cope with the immense physical and spiritual hardship create a notable religious-historical document.

== Discovery of the Writings After the Holocaust ==
Sometime between the deportation to Treblinka and the Warsaw Ghetto Uprising, after which the Rebbe was murdered in Trawniki, he handed the manuscript to a member of the Oyneg Shabbos Archive. The manuscript was buried in a milk jug in the ghetto soil, along with other documents collected by the underground archive members. The pages were discovered in Poland a few years after the war by a worker during foundation laying for a new building in Warsaw on the ruins of the ghetto, and they were handed over to the Jewish Historical Institute in Warsaw.

In 1957, the pages were identified, and copies were sent by Baruch Dubdevani to the Piaseczno Hasidim in Israel. This was done following a request from the Piaseczno Hasidim to check if he could obtain the writings. In the foreword to the book, Baruch Dubdevani describes how he stumbled upon the letter from the Rebbe asking his brother, Rabbi Yeshayahu Shapira, and his friends in Israel to publish his writings. Dubdevani saw the discovery of the letter as a "holy will" and decided to find the writings come what may. Indeed, he managed to find them. Letters from the Rebbe of Piaseczno to the finder of the writings and to his friends in Israel are also printed at the beginning of the book.

The collection of sermons was published under the name "Holy Fire" for the first time in 1960 by the Committee of Piaseczno Hasidim. Since then, the book has been printed in several editions.

In 2017, a scholarly revised edition titled "Sermons from the Years of Wrath" was published in two volumes. This edition was edited based on the original manuscript found in the Ringelblum Archive at the Jewish Historical Institute in Poland. The first volume includes the revised sermons with added source references and explanations. The second volume contains a facsimile edition where, alongside a color photograph of the manuscript, an accurate transcription in four colors (black, red, blue, and green) distinguishes between different layers of revisions made by the author.

The pages themselves, written by the Rebbe, are located, along with the entire "Oyneg Shabbos" archive of Ringelblum, in the governmental archive of the Polish government.
