= Grodzhisk =

Grodzhisk is a Hasidic dynasty founded by Rebbe Elimelech Szapira, author of Imrei Elimelech. Grodzhisk is the Yiddish name of Grodzisk Mazowiecki, a town in present-day Poland.

== Lineage ==
- Rabbi Elimelech Szapira of Grodzhisk (b. 1823, d. 29 March 1892).
  - Rabbi Yisroel Szapira. son of Rabbi Elimelech Szapira.
  - Rabbi Chayim Myer Yechiel Szapira, son of Rabbi Elimelech Szapira.
    - Rabbi Yisroel Shapira (killed at Treblinka, 1942), son of Rabbi Chayim Myer Yechiel.
      - Rabbi Avraham Elimelech Szapira (d. Dec. 6, 1966), son of Rabbi Yisroel Shapira.
  - Rabbi Kalonymus Kalman Shapira of Piaseczno (b. 1889, killed at Trawniki, November 3, 1943), son of Rabbi Elimelech Szapira.
  - Rabbi Isaiah, son of Rabbi Elimelech Szapira.
    - Rabbi Elimelech, son of Rabbi Isaiah.
      - Rabbi Kalman Menachem, son of Rabbi Elimelech - current Piaseczno-Grodzhisk Rebbe in Ramat Beit Shemesh
