= Toldot Yaakov Yosef =

1780 book of Hasidic teachings

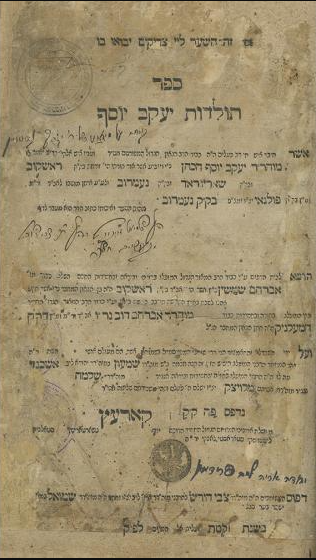
- Title page of original publication in Korets
- Author: Jacob Joseph of Polonne
- Language: Hebrew
- Genre: Hasidic literature
- Publication date: 1780
- Publication place: Ukraine

Toldot Yaakov Yosef (Hebrew: תולדות יעקב יוסף; lit. 'The History of Jacob Joseph') is a book written by Rabbi Jacob Joseph Katz of Polonne, a prominent disciple of the Baal Shem Tov. It was first published in 1780 in order to strengthen and spread the teachings of Hasidic philosophy.

== History ==
The book, first published in 1780, was the first Hasidic book to appear in print, and is one of four books written by Katz. His books are considered unique in Hasidic literature, as he was one of a select few to hear the teachings of the Baal Shem Tov firsthand.

It was enthusiastically received within Hasidic circles, but was boycotted in non-Hasidic circles, and many prominent anti-Hasidic rabbis held public burnings of the book in the towns of Brody by Yechezkel Landau and Vilna.

== Contents ==
Toldot Yaakov Yosef is edited similarly to a commentary on the parshahs, and includes discussions of Halakha, although not exclusively Hasidic thought. The book also has a lot of content concerning the teachings of the Baal Shem Tov, containing more than 280 quotations from him, each preceded by the words "I heard form my teacher."

== Criticism ==
The writing was the first Hasidic book published in print describing the teachings of the Baal Shem Tov, and as such, attracted harsh criticism from those who rejected Hasidic thought. It was seen as controversial that the book was printed without pre-discussed agreement between different scholars, as was customary at the time for publication of commentaries of the Torah.
