= Kozhnitz (Hasidic dynasty) =

Polish Hasidic dynasty

Kozhnitz is the name of a Hasidic dynasty founded by the Kozhnitzer Maggid, Rebbe Yisroel Hopsztajn. Kozhnitz is the Yiddish name of Kozienice, a town in Poland.

== Lineage ==
Rebbe Yisroel Hopsztajn, the Maggid and founder of the Kozhnitz dynasty, and one of the three "patriarchs" of Polish hasidism, was a disciple of Rebbe Elimelech of Lizhensk (Rabbi Elimelech Lipman of Lizhensk), author of Noam Elimelech. The Rebbe Elimelech was a disciple of the Rebbe Dovber, the Maggid ("preacher") of Mezeritch, the primary disciple of the Baal Shem Tov, the founder of Hasidism.

- Kozhnitzer Magid : Yisroel Hopsztajn (c. 1733 – 1814), author of the classic Avodas Yisroel.
  - Second Kozhnitzer Rebbe : Moshe Elyokim Bri'o Hopsztajn (c. 1757 – 1828)— son of the Avodas Yisroel; rebbe from 1814 to 1828.
    - Third Kozhnitzer Rebbe : Chayim Myer Yechiel Shapira (1789 – 1849), the Sorof of Moglenitz—grandson of the Avodas Yisroel : rebbe from 1828 to 1849; descendant ben acher ben, from the Megaleh Amukos, son-in-law of R' Elozor of Lizensk (son of the Elimelech of Lizensk). His father, R' Avi Ezri Zelig Shapira was the son-in-law of the Maggid of Kozhnitz.
      - Rebbe Avi Ezri Zelig Shapira of Moglenitz, son of R Chaim Myer Yechiel, son-in-law of Admor Avrohom Yaakov Friedman, first Sadigura rebbe.
        - Rebbe Chaim Myer Yechiel Shapira of Drubitch, son of R Avi Ezri Zelig Shapira, son-in-law of Rebbe Yitzchok Friedman of Bohush.
          - Rebbe Avraham Yaakov Shapira of Drubitch and Jerusalem, Drubitcher Rebbe, son of Rebbe Chaim Myer Yechiel Shapira, son-in-law of Rebbe Nosson Dovid Rabinowicz of Partzov (below).
    - Fourth Kozhnitzer Rebbe : Elozor Hopsztajn (I) (d. 1861)—son of Moshe Elyokim Bri'o Hopsztajn; rebbe from 1849 to 1861.
      - Fifth Kozhnitzer Rebbe : Yechiel Yaakov Hopsztajn (1846–1866)—son of Elozor; rebbe from 1863 – 1866.
        - Rebbe Nosson Dovid Rabinowicz of Paczev, Partzever Rebbe, son-in-law of Rebbe Yechiel Yaakov (and son of the Biala Rebbe, Yitzchok Yaakov Rabinowicz and direct descendant of the Yid / Yehudi HaKadosh)
        - Sixth Kozhnitzer Rebbe : Yerachmiel Moshe Hopsztajn son of Yechiel Yaakov (1860- 13th of Elul 1909)
          - Seventh generation of Kozhnitzer Rebbes
          - Rebbe Aharon Yechiel, son of Rebbe Yerachmiel Moshe (1892- 3rd of Tishre 1942). He was rebbe around the same time as his brother.
          - Rebbe Yisroel Elozor (1889–1966)
            - Eighth Kozhnitzer Rebbe in Israel : Moshe Shimshon Sternberg (a grandson of Rebbe Yisroel Elozor Hopsztajn [seventh generation]), one of the last Hasidic rebbes remaining in the mostly secular Tel Aviv. Does outreach (kiruv) work in Tel Aviv; Bnei Brak; Jerusalem; and Upper West Side, Manhattan in New York.
          - Rebbe Asher Elimelech

Kozhnitz communities in Williamsburg, Borough Park, Monsey and Sea Gate in Brooklyn also have their own rebbes, all descendants of the Maggid.

== See also ==
- History of the Jews in Poland
