= Naftali Zvi of Ropshitz =

Polish rabbi

- Title: Naftali of Ropshitz

Personal life
- Born: Naftali Zvi Horowitz; 22 May 1760
- Died: 8 May 1827 (aged 66)
- Buried: Łańcut, Poland
- Children: Rebbe Avraham Chaim of Linsk, Rebbe Yaakov of Melitz, Rebbe Eliezer of Dzhikov, and Ratza
- Parents: Rabbi Menachem Mendel Rubin of Linsk (father); Beila (mother)
- Dynasty: Ropshitz

Religious life
- Religion: Judaism
- Main work: Zera Kodesh and Ayala Shelucha
- Dynasty: Ropshitz

Naftali Zvi Horowitz of Ropshitz (22 May 1760 – 8 May 1827) was a Galician rebbe.

== Biography ==
Horowitz was born on 22 May 1760, the day that the Baal Shem Tov died, to Menachem Mendel Rubin of Linsk. His mother Beila was the daughter of Yitzchak Halevi Horowitz of Hamburg. Horowitz adopted the surname of his maternal grandfather.

He was the first Ropshitzer rebbe. As a youth, Horowitz studied in the yeshiva of his uncle Meshullam Egra, one of the Torah giants of the time, where his fellow students were Mordecai Benet and Yaakov Lorberbaum, who were to become two of the leading scholars of the next generation. Horowitz became attracted to the Hasidic movement, and traveled to the court of Elimelech of Lizhensk. Because of Horowitz's illustrious lineage, Elimelech at first refused to admit him^{why?}, as was his custom ^{which?}, but finally acquiesced to Horowitz's entreaties.

Upon the death of Elimelech, Horowitz became a student of Elimelech's disciple, Reb Menachem Mendel of Rimanov.

Horowitz is reputed to have had tens of thousands of followers. He died on 11 Iyar 5587 (corresponding to 8 May 1827) and is buried in Łańcut.

Horowitz is a crucial figure in the development of Galician Hassidism. There are many minhagei Ropshitz— "customs of Ropshitz", which are followed by Galician Hasidim. He was known for his profound wisdom, sharp sense of humor, and musical gifts. In his later years he perceived that some Hasidim followed Hasidic practices but were negligent in some basic requirements of Jewish Law, such as timely prayer, and questioned if it would not be better if the Hasidic way were replaced by greater concentration on Torah study. When Yosef Babad, the future author of the Minchas Chinuch, came to become a follower of his he sent him away, advising him to return home and pursue his studies in the revealed aspects of Torah.

Many major rabbis are descendants of the dynasty founded by Horowitz (see Ropshitz dynasty).

== Teachings ==
Horowitz emphasized the power of prayer and stressed that a person must be able to pray in all circumstances and never say "I don’t have the head for prayer now." In answer to the question how can a tzadik undo a divine decree, he replied that through his actions and prayer a tzadik creates a new world, to which the old decree does not apply. He commented that Moses was shown each generation first, and then shown their leaders, because he might be dismayed at seeing The Rebbe as a leader. However, having first seen the generation, he understood that The Rebbe was appropriate for his generation.

Horowitz was particularly devoted to the mitzvah of sukkah and it is said that every day he was preoccupied with some aspect of that mitzvah, which he said was dear to his soul. Often in his works he speaks about the holiday of Sukkos.

== Writings ==
Initially, Horowitz refused to give permission for the publication of his writings, but with the concurrence of his famous disciple, Chaim Halberstam of Sanz, author of Divrei Chaim, his two works, Zera Kodesh and Ayala Shelucha were finally published. The only praise he permitted on his tombstone was "the singular one in his generation in the knowledge of God": ("יחיד בדורו בחכמת אלוקים".)
