= Yitzchak Isaac Taub =

Hungarian tabbi and composer (1751–1821)

Rabbi Yitzchak Isaac Taub (in Hungarian: Taub Eizik Izsák) (1751–7th of Adar 2, March 21, 1821) was the rabbi of Nagykálló (in Yiddish Kalov), Hungary and the first Hassidic Rebbe in Hungary. He was known as "the Sweet Singer of Israel". He composed many popular Hasidic melodies. He was famous for composing the traditional Hungarian Hasidic tune "Szól a kakas már".

== Biography ==
His exact place of birth is uncertain, most probably he was born either in Nagykálló or Szerencs. Taub was discovered by Rabbi Leib Sarah's, a disciple of the Baal Shem Tov, who first met him when he was a small child and took him to Nikolsburg to learn with Rabbi Shmelke of Nikolsburg.

== Songs ==
He composed many popular Hasidic Nigunim (melodies). Often he adapted Hungarian folk songs, adding Jewish words, by that transforming it to sacred songs. He taught that the tunes he heard were really from the Holy Temple in Jerusalem, and were lost among the nations over the years, and he found them and returned them to the Jewish people. He said that the proof that it was true was that the gentile who would teach him the song would forget it as soon as the rebbe learned it. He was famous for composing the traditional Hungarian Hasidic tune Szól a kakas már.

Szól a kakas már, majd megvirrad már.
Zöld erdőben, sík mezőben sétál egy madár.
De micsoda madár, de micsoda madár!
Sárga lába, gyöngy a szárnya, engem oda vár.

Várj madár, várj! [Te csak mindig várj!]
Ha az Isten néked rendel, a tiéd leszek már!
De mikor lesz az már, de mikor lesz az már?
„Jibone háMikdos, ir Cijajn tömálé,” akkor lesz az már.
[De miért nincs az már, de miért nincs az már?
„Mipné chátoénu golinu méárcénu,” azért nincs az már.]

Translation:

The rooster is calling already, it will be dawn soon.
In a green forest, in a flat field a bird is walking.
But what a bird, but what a bird!
Its leg is yellow, its wing is pearl[-like], it waits me [to go] there.

Wait bird, wait! [You shall always wait!]
If God destines [me] for you, then I will be yours!
But when it will be, but when it will be?
“Yiboneh haMiqdosh, ir Tziyayn temaleih,” it will be then.
[But why isn't it already, but why isn't it already?
“Mipnei chatoeinu golinu meiartzeinu,” that is why not already.]

Words in square brackets are sometimes omitted. See Hungarian phonology about proper pronunciation.

When Leib Sarah's found him, he sang in Hungarian a song he knew from the shepherds, Erdő, erdő, which he adapted to Judaism by changing the words. In Yitzack Isaac's version, the love in the song is for the Shechina (Divine Presence) that is in exile until the Messiah:

Forest, O forest, how vast are you!
Rose, O rose, how distant you are!
Were the forest not so vast,
My rose wouldn't be so far.
Who will guide me out of the forest,
And unite me with my rose?
Then he sang it as Rabbi Leib Sarah's heard it.

Exile, O exile, how vast are you!
Shechinah, Shechinah, how distant you are!
Were the exile not so vast,
The Shechinah wouldn't be so far.
Who will guide me out of the exile,
And unite me with the Shechinah?

Another famous song by the Kaliver Rebbe is Sírnak, rínak a bárányok – also in Hungarian.
