= Yisroel Hopstein =

Hasidic leader of Poland (1737–1814)

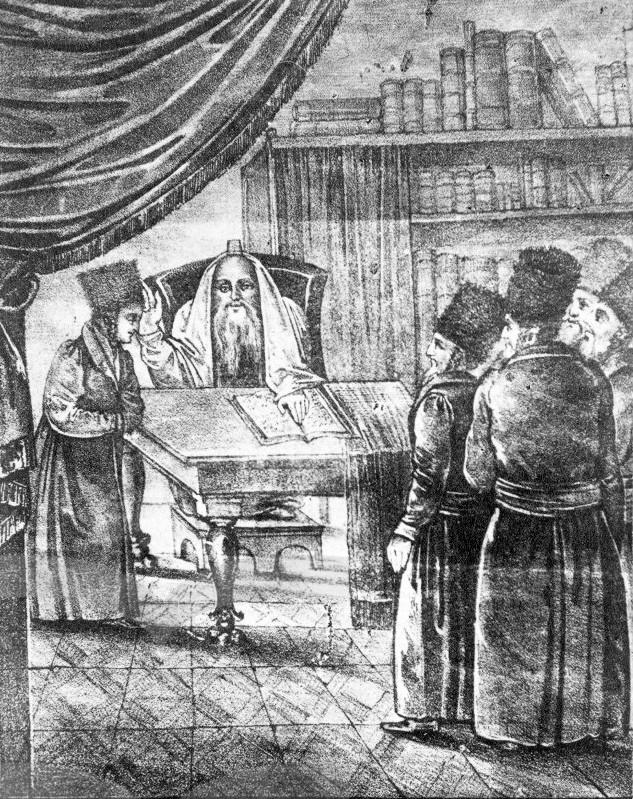
- Title: Maggid of Kozhnitz

Personal life
- Born: 1737 Opatów, Polish–Lithuanian Commonwealth
- Died: 1814 (aged 76–77) Kozienice, Duchy of Warsaw
- Spouse: Royze
- Parents: Shabbetai (father); Perl (mother)
- Dynasty: Kozhnitz

Religious life
- Religion: Judaism

Jewish leader
- Successor: Moshe Elyakim
- Main work: title of main seifer
- Dynasty: Kozhnitz

Rabbi Yisroel Hopstein (Hebrew: ישראל הופשטיין; 1737–1814), commonly known as the Maggid of Kozhnitz (or Kozhnitser Maggid), was a towering figure in the third generation of the Hasidic movement, a noted Kabbalist, and the founder of the Kozhnitz Hasidic dynasty in Poland. His profound influence extended through the late 18th and early 19th centuries. He was a student of both the Magid/Dov Ber of Mezeritch and Elimelech of Lizhensk, and wrote many books on Chassidus and Kabbalah.

He is sometimes referred to as the "Avodat Yisrael" after the title of his most famous work, a commentary on the Torah.

== Biography ==
=== Early life and education ===
Hopstein was born in Opatów (Apta), Poland, in either 1736 or 1737, to his parents, Shabbetai (Shabsi/Shabtay) and Perl. His father was a poor bookbinder. According to tradition, his birth came after his parents, who were impoverished and advanced in age, received a blessing from the Baal Shem Tov. Other traditions relate that his father's neutrality during a major dispute in the synagogue earned heavenly merit, resulting in the birth of a holy son.

The young Israel was recognized early on as an illui (prodigy), revealing prodigious ability in his studies despite a weak constitution and sickly nature. His initial rabbinic studies took place under Rabbi Dov Beirish Katz (Chief Rabbi of Apta), and he also studied with Rabbi Mordechai Tzvi Horowitz and Rabbi Menachem.

=== Hasidic masters ===
Rabbi Israel's path to Hasidism began under the tutelage of Rabbi Shmelke Hurwitz of Nikolsburg, who introduced him to the movement. He became a devoted student (talmid) of Rabbi Dov Ber, the Maggid of Mezritch, who led the Hasidic movement after the death of the Baal Shem Tov. The Maggid requested that Rabbi Israel undertake the important scholarly task of creating an accurate edition of the liturgy, the Siddur Ha'Arizal (Prayer Book according to the teachings of Isaac Luria). The Maggid foretold that through Israel's influence, people in Warsaw would begin adopting the Lurianic Liturgy (known as Nusah Ari).

After the death of the Maggid of Mezritch in 1772, Rabbi Israel became a follower of Rabbi Elimelech of Lizhensk. At Lizhensk, Rabbi Israel was counted among the four greatest primary disciples. He maintained close ties with contemporaries such as Rabbi Levi Isaac of Berdichev.

=== Leadership in Kozhnitz ===
Rabbi Israel served as a melamed (teacher) for youths initially, eventually adopting the style of orator or maggid. In approximately 1766 (5525), he was formally appointed as the Maggid of Kozhnitz (Kozienice) and its surrounding villages, including Magnishov and Gritza. He also established a yeshiva there.

He became Rebbe in 1785 (5546). With the possible exception of the Chozeh (Seer) of Lublin, the Kozhnitzer Maggid was regarded as the central authority of Hasidism in Poland in his generation.

== Teachings and mysticism ==
=== Scholarly depth ===
The Kozhnitzer Maggid was considered a gaon (genius) in both the revealed (Talmudic) and hidden (Kabbalistic) parts of the Torah. He was a Talmudic scholar who wrote novellae and responsa. Even before he met the Maggid of Mezritch, he had studied over 800 works of Kabbalah. His knowledge of the revealed Torah, including the entire Talmud Yerushalmi, was attested to by Rabbi Hayyim of Volozhin, a foremost disciple of the Vilna Gaon and opponent of Hasidism.

=== Core Hasidic concepts ===
His foundational work, Avodat Yisrael, is considered one of the most complex and penetrating Hasidic classics, drawing heavily on his Kabbalistic knowledge. He provided profound, creative exegetical insights characterized by stylistic elegance and clarity.

- Teshuvah (Repentance): He taught that true repentance involves returning to God until the Creator becomes one's personal source of Godliness, making the individual a vehicle for sanctity and holiness. This allows one to approach prayer without barriers, like speaking to a best friend.
- Prayer (Tefillah): He advocated for intense, rapturous prayer characterized by loud shouting and physical gestures, sometimes leading to him collapsing from exhaustion. He taught that prayers recited with proper kavanah (devotion, awe, and fear) are "kosher prayers". These proper prayers have the power to gather previously improper, "carcass" prayers and uplift them to Heaven, thereby crowning God.
- Kabbalah and Maharal: Rabbi Israel was pivotal in integrating the philosophy of Rabbi Judah Loew (Maharal) of Prague into Hasidic thought. He spiritually sponsored the reprinting of Maharal's works in the late 18th and early 19th centuries. His book, Geulat Yisrael, was the first Hasidic work to use Maharal as a primary source. He sought to find core principles of the Arizal's Lurianic Kabbalah within Maharal's writings, specifically imposing a pronounced Kabbalistic framework on Maharal's ideas.

=== Miracles and public service ===
Rabbi Israel's was considered a thaumaturge (wonder-worker); even Christians believed in his supernatural powers. His blessings and amulets were considered efficacious for healing, and he was renowned for having the power to bless barren couples with fertility.

He was deeply committed to social justice and kindness (chessed), caring for orphans and widows. He raised many orphans in his own home. He lived austerely in poverty, distributing all monies received as charity. He was the foster father and mentor to Rabbi Isaac Meir Alter, the future founder of the Ger Hasidic dynasty.

== Historical context and political activity ==
The Kozhnitzer Maggid actively used his influence to help the Jewish community. He received early intelligence about hostile government plans against Jews and, when necessary, used his connections to cancel harsh decrees.

He was on friendly terms with several influential Polish nobles, including Prince Adam Czartoryski, who sought his blessing for a child.

During the time of the Napoleonic Wars, Rabbi Israel was involved in a secret movement centered on the possibility of hastening the coming of the Messiah due to the world upheaval.

An anecdote concerns his prophecy regarding Polish statehood: when a nobleman sought his intercession for Polish independence following the Partitions of Poland, the Maggid foretold that Poland would regain sovereignty for a span of "three shemitin" (three sabbatical cycles, or 21 years). This prediction was recalled in Warsaw when the Luftwaffe bombed the city in September 1939, exactly 21 years after Poland declared independence in 1918.

== Death and legacy ==
Rabbi Israel Hapstein lived in Kozhnitz for many years. He died on the 14th of Tishrei (September 28, 1814).

He is remembered as one of the founders of Hasidism in central Poland and a major link in the chain of transmission of the Baal Shem Tov's teachings. The Kozhnitz Hasidic dynasty continued through his son and subsequent descendants, wielding influence in Poland and Galicia through the 19th and 20th centuries.

== Disciples ==
The Kozhnitzer Maggid attracted scores of students. Almost all the great tzadikim from the courts of Mezritch and Lizhensk in the next generation were counted among his disciples. Notable students included Rabbi Simcha Bunam of Przysucha and Rabbi Shalom Rokeah of Belz.

== Family and dynasty ==
Rabbi Israel Hapstein was married to Royze. They had three children: two sons and one daughter.

- Rabbi Moshe Elyakim Beriyah Hapstein (c. 1777–1828): Succeeded his father as Rebbe. He was appointed successor upon the command of the Chozeh of Lublin.
- Leah Perl Shapiro (known as Perele der Magids): Married Rabbi Avi Ezra Zelig Shapira, Rabbi of Grenitz. Perele was a pivotal figure known for her own spiritual practices and dispensation of blessings and talismanic oil.
- Mottel: Died in his youth.

Notable descendants include Rabbi Hayim Meir Yehiel Shapiro of Mogelnits, known as the "Seraph of Mogelnits" (Perle's son), and Rabbi Kalonymus Kalmish Shapiro of Piaseczna (a great-grandson), who became prominent for his teachings in the Warsaw Ghetto during the Holocaust.

== Literary works ==
Rabbi Israel Hapstein was a prolific author of works spanning Kabbalah, Halakha, and Hasidic philosophy. His writings were often published posthumously. Key published works include:

- Avodat Yisrael (עבודת ישראל): A classic Hasidic commentary on the Torah and Pirkei Avot (Ethics of the Fathers), first published posthumously in 1842.
- Geulat Yisrael (גאולת ישראל): Commentary on the works of Maharal of Prague, particularly Gevurot HaShem.
- Nezer Yisrael (נזר ישראל): Commentary on the Zohar
- Or Yisrael (אור ישראל): Commentary on the Tikkunei HaZohar
- Yakar MiPaz (יקר מפז): Commentary on the Torah.
- Tehillot Yisrael (תהילת ישראל): Commentary on the Book of Psalms.
- Gevurat Yisrael (גבורת ישראל): A commentary on the Pesach Haggadah.
- Beit Yisrael (בית ישראל): Talmudic novellae.
- Agunat Yisrael: Responsa focused on cases regarding agunot (women chained to inaccessible husbands), demonstrating his expertise in legal matters.
- Chidushei Maggid Mishna: Innovative interpretations on the Mishnayot.
- She'erit Yisrael (שארית ישראל): Commentary on Midrash.
- Ner Yisrael (נר ישראל): Commentary on Likutei Rav Hai Gaon and Sha'ar Hashamayim of Joseph Gikatilla.
