= Elimelech of Lizhensk =

18th century rabbi

- Title: Elimelech of Lezajsk

Personal life
- Born: Elimelech Weisblum; 1717 Tykocin, Poland
- Died: March 11, 1787 (aged 69–70) Leżajsk, Kingdom of Galicia and Lodomeria
- Buried: Leżajsk, Poland
- Spouse: Shprintza, Gittel
- Children: Rabbi Elazar, Rabbi Eliezer Lipa, Reb Yaakov, Mirish, Esther Ethel
- Parents: Eliezer Lipman (father); Mirel dit Mirish (mother)
- Dynasty: Lizhensk

Religious life
- Religion: Judaism

Jewish leader
- Predecessor: Dov Ber of Mezeritch
- Successor: Chozeh of Lublin, Yisroel of Kozhnitz
- Main work: Noam Elimelech
- Dynasty: Lizhensk

Elimelech Weisblum of Lizhensk (1717–March 11, 1787) was a rabbi and one of the founding Rebbes of the Hasidic movement. His hometown was Leżajsk (Yiddish: ליזשענסק, romanized: Lizhensk) near Rzeszów in Poland. He was part of the inner "Chevraya Kadisha" (Holy Society) school of Dov Ber of Mezeritch (second leader of the Hasidic movement), who became the decentralised, third generation leadership after the passing of Dov Ber in 1772.

Elimelech wrote Noam Elimelech, which developed the Hasidic theory of the Tzaddik into the full doctrine of "Practical/Popular Tzaddikism". He was the founder of Hasidism in Poland-Galicia, and numerous leaders and Hasidic dynasties emerged from his disciples in the early 19th century, including the Chozeh of Lublin, the Maggid of Koznitz and Menachem Mendel of Rimanov, one of the three "Fathers of Polish Hasidism".

== Biography ==
Elimelech was born in Tykocin.

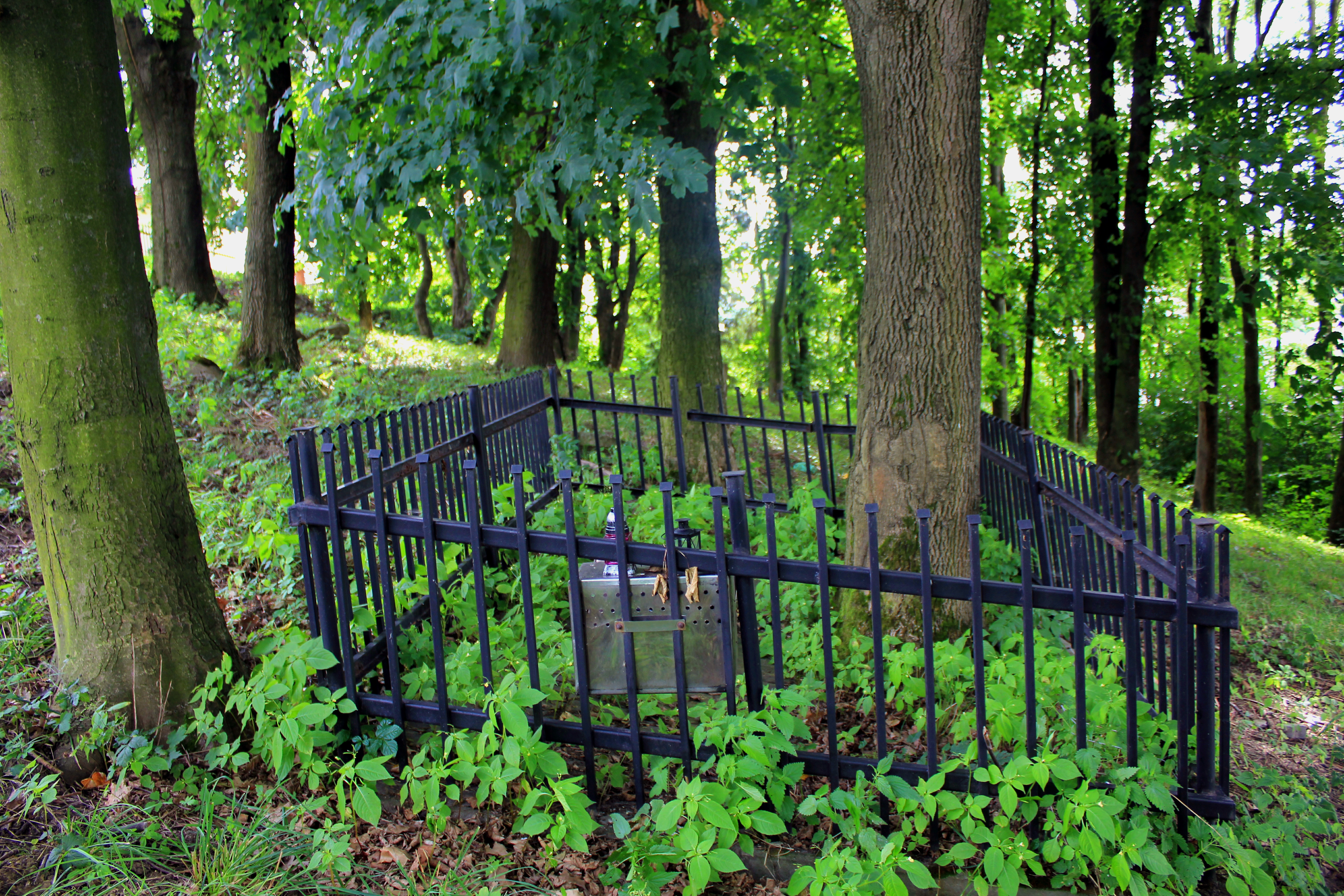
Elimelech's daughter Ester Etel Elbaum's grave in Frysztak, 2013

He married Sprinza (Esperanza), daughter of Rabbi Aharon Rokach Margolioth, and they had five children. After her death Elimelech married Gittel, daughter of Rabbi Yaakov Margolioth.

He died in Leżajsk on the 21st of Adar.

=== Elimelech and his brother Zushya ===
Elimelech was a student of Dovber of Mezeritch, as was his brother Meshulam Zushya of Anipoli. Both brothers are important figures in Hasidic tradition. The two offered a contrast in the model of the Hasidic Rebbe, with Elimelech the ascetic scholar, and Zushya giving the impression of the charismatic "saintly simpleton", although he too was well versed in Hasidic philosophy.

=== Hasidic Leadership ===
After the death of Dovber of Mezeritch the Hasidic movement avoided one centralised leader, as it had under the Baal Shem Tov and Dovber. Instead Dovber's students dispersed across Eastern Europe, from Poland to Russia, taking with them their different interpretations of Hasidism. He began the dissemination of Hasidism in Poland, which subsequently increased to a much greater extent under his foremost disciple, the Chozeh of Lublin.

Many of Elimelech's students (talmidim) went on to be rebbes themselves, including the Chozeh of Lublin, Menachem Mendel of Rimanov, the Kozhnitzer Maggid, the Apter Rov and Kalonymus Kalman Epstein, author of Maor Vashemesh.

His grave in Leżajsk, Poland, is visited by thousands of Hasidism, particularly on the anniversary of his death, the 21st of the Hebrew month of Adar (in leap years in Adar II). In 2012, approximately 6,000 pilgrims came to visit the site on the anniversary coming from Israel, Ukraine, Hungary, Germany, Holland, France, Great Britain, Canada and the USA. In most Chasidic minyanim, Tachanun is omitted on the Noam Elimelech's Yartzeit.

== Noam Elimelech ==
As is common among prominent rabbis he is often known by the name of his best known book, in his case Noam Elimelech, a commentary on the Torah which is one of the principal works of Hasidism.

The book has asterisks or stars placed in seemingly random places within the text. Tradition has it that these stars were placed by the author intentionally and contain some meaning. They are therefore included in almost all subsequent printed editions of the work.

Elimelech also wrote Tzetl Koton, a seventeen-point program on how to be a good Jew, and Hanhagos HaAdam, a list of Minhagim (customs) for pious Jews to follow.

Jewish titles
Preceded by Magid of Mezritsh	Hasidic Rebbes; 1772–1786	Succeeded by Chozeh of Lublin, Rabbi Yisroel of Kozhnitz
