= Yaakov Yitzchak of Lublin =

Polish Hasadic leader (c. 1745–1815)

Rabbi Yaakov Yitzchak of Lublin
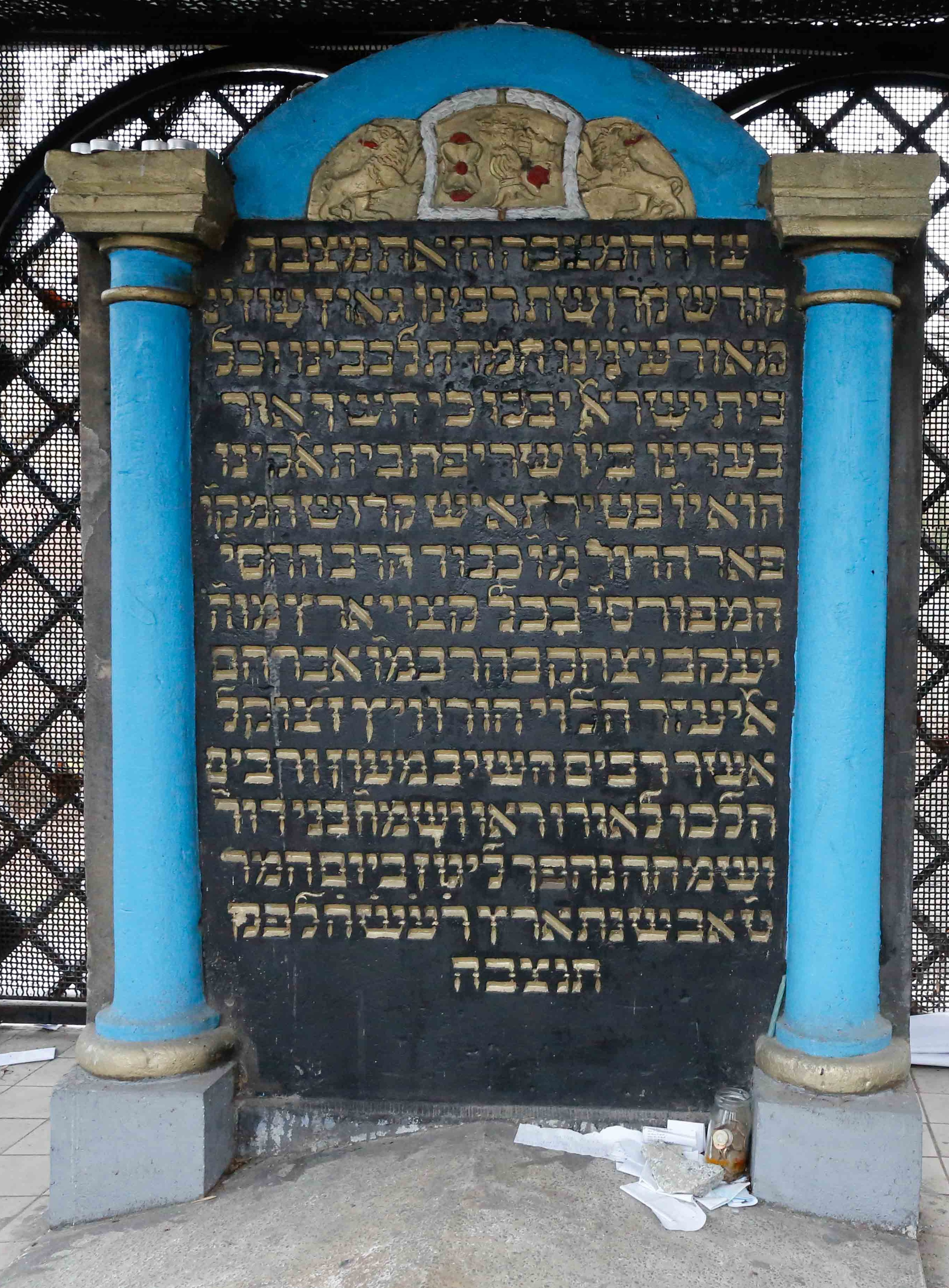
- Tombstone
- Title: Seer of Lublin

Personal life
- Born: Yaakov Yitzchak HaLevi Horowitz; 1745
- Died: August 15, 1815 (aged 69–70)
- Buried: Lublin
- Children: Rabbi Tzvi Halevi Horowitz, Rabbi Israel Halevi Horowitz, Rabbi Yosef Halevi Horowitz, Rabbi Avraham Halevi
- Parents: Rabbi Avraham Eliezer Halevi Horowitz (father); Matil, daughter of Rabbi Yaakov Koppel of Lukow (mother)

Religious life
- Religion: Judaism

Jewish leader
- Main work: Torat HaChozeh MiLublin

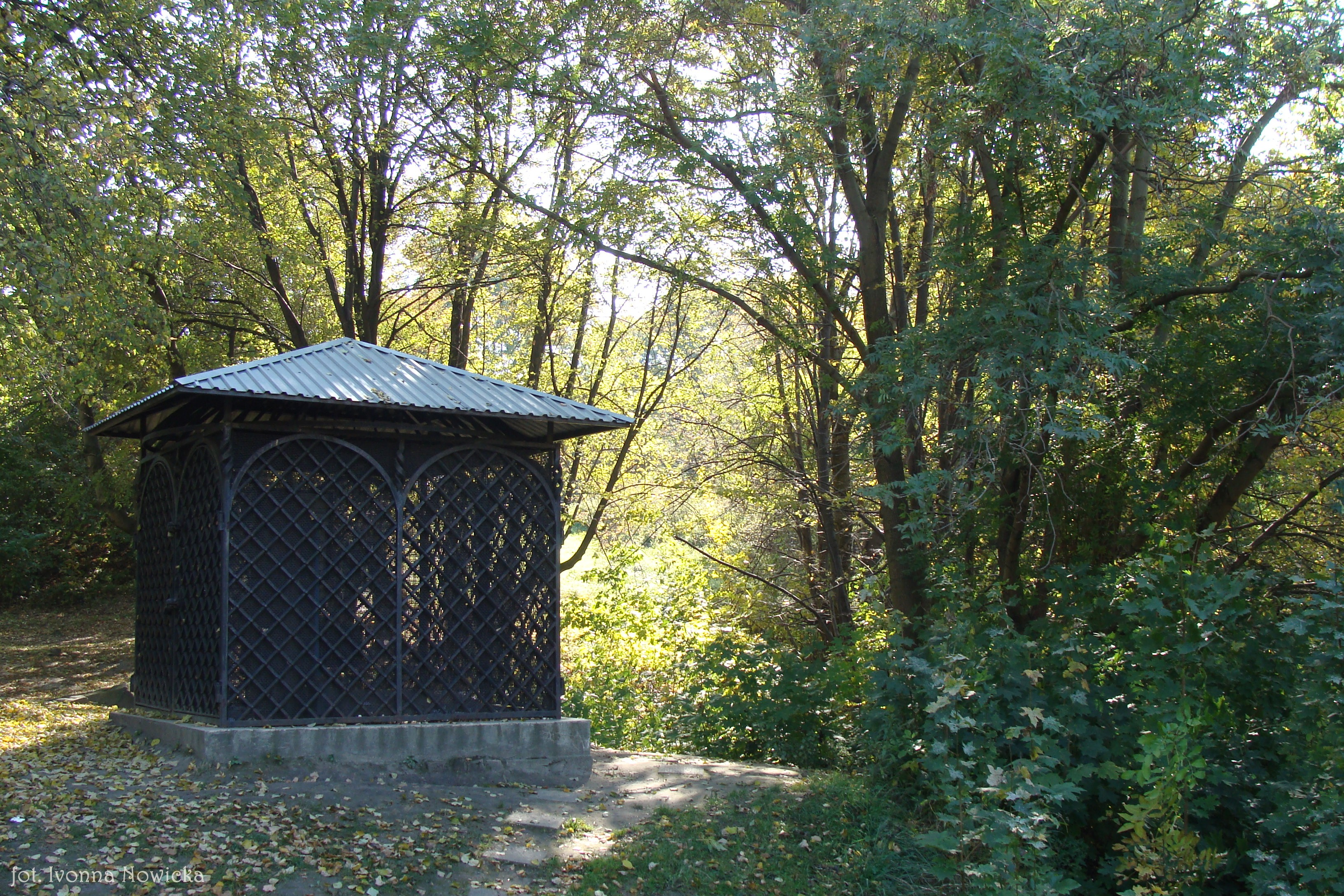
The ohel of the Rebbe

Yaakov Yitzchak HaLevi Horowitz (Hebrew: יעקב יצחק הלוי הורוביץ), known as "the Seer of Lublin" (החוזה מלובלין), ha-Chozeh MiLublin; (c. 1745 - August 15, 1815) was a Hasidic rebbe from Poland.

He was a disciple of the Maggid of Mezritch. He continued his studies under Shmelke of Nilkolsburg and Elimelech of Lizhensk. He lived for a while in Lantzut before moving to Lublin.

After Horowitz moved to Lublin, thousands of Hasidim flocked to learn from him. Among his disciples were such Hasidic luminaries as Yaakov Yitzchak Rabinowicz ("the Holy Jew"), Simcha Bunim of Peshischa, Meir of Apta, David of Lelov, Moshe Teitelbaum, Tzvi Elimelech of Dinov, Naftali Zvi of Ropshitz, and Shalom Rokeach of Belz. Rabbi Yaakov Yitzchak was known as the "Seer of Lublin" (Chozeh MiLublin) due to his reputed prophetic insight and spiritual vision. His disciples, followers, and contemporaries testified that he possessed the ability to perceive realities beyond the physical realm — across spatial dimensions such as distance, height, and depth, as well as temporal dimensions, including past and future events. Witnesses also attributed to him the capacity to discern people's innermost thoughts, words, and hidden actions. He was further described as having visions of spiritual worlds, including Heaven, Hell, reincarnated souls, and angels. His students regarded him as a figure akin to a biblical prophet. During his stay in Lublin, Horowitz was opposed by a prominent mitnaged rabbi, Azriel Horowitz. He established his synagogue there at Szeroka 28 in the Jewish Quarter of Lublin. Even after Horowitz's death the synagogue remained the heart and soul for the scholars of the city. During the war the building was demolished to the ground, and was never rebuilt. Lately the Lublin Organization in New York made an attempt to restitute the property in order to rebuild the synagogue in remembrance of Rabbi Horowitz, but their efforts were unsuccessful.

Horowitz was a descendant of Isaiah Horowitz, a prominent rabbi and mystic, and his maternal grandfather, Yaakov Koppel Likover, also a prominent rabbi and scholar, as well as a contemporary of the Ba'al Shem Tov.

He was injured in a fall from a window on Simchat Torah night, following the ritual hakafos dancing, and died almost a year later on Tisha B'av from injuries relating to this fall. He is buried in the Old Jewish Cemetery, Lublin. His great grandson was Rabbi Kalonymus Kalman Shapira of Piaseczna.

== Works ==
His writings are contained in four books:

- Divrei Emet
- Zot Zikaron
- Zikaron Zot
- Zikaron Tov

In a compilation of these works, entitled Torat HaChozeh MiLublin, his commentaries are arranged alphabetically according to topics and according to the weekly Torah portion.
