= Nekudim =

The realm known as Nekudim/Olam HaNekudim (World of "Points/Spotted") is one of the many spiritual worlds (Olamot) described by Kabbalah, as part of the order of development in Creation. Its significance emerges in Lurianic Kabbalah as part of the process of Tohu and Tikun.

Nekudim is the second of three stages to emerge from Adam Kadmon (Akudim, Nekudim, Berudim). Luria read these from the esoteric meaning of Jacob's breeding of Laban's flocks in Genesis 30:27-43. In Nekudim the Sephirot manifest as 10 lights in 10 isolated (point-like) vessels, without interaction. This corresponds to Olam HaTohu (the "World of Chaos"), the archetype of disorder in Creation, precipitating Shevirat HaKeilim ("Shattering of the sephirot Vessels").

== The source of the world of Nekudim ==
In the world of Nekudim, light emanates metaphorically out of the "eyes" of Adam Kadmon (AK), and descends to encompass AK from "naval" to "feet."

== "Lights" and "Vessels" in the world of Nekudim ==
In the realm of Nekudim, ten individual vessels are created to contain the ten sephirot lights of this world. The vessels are small, undeveloped or "immature". Relative to the fully developed vessels in the world of Atzilut, the vessels of Nekudim are merely "points". Unlike the world of Akudim, where the ten lights flow freely in and out of the single vessel in the process of "mati v'lo mati", in the world of Nekudim all of the lights enter, forcefully, into their respective vessels and break them. The world of Nekudim is generally referred to as Olam HaTohu (the "World of Chaos"). Tohu is characterised by high lights and weak vessels. The vessels' weakness derives from the Sephirot acting in the scheme of Iggulim (concentric "Circles"), without interacting and strengthening each other through harmony.

Often the two worlds of Akudim and Nekudim are considered to be two forms of Tohu-Chaos, relatively "stable chaos" (Akudim, the form of "chaos" which doesn't break) and "unstable chaos" (Nekudim, the form of "chaos" which breaks). In modern scientific Chaos Theory these two forms of "chaos" are described in relation to the physical world.

== Manifestations of the world of Nekudim in human beings ==
In the human soul, this is compared to a youth who possesses distinct but limited language skills, which hold him back from truly expressing his emotions. In the human soul the shattering of vessels of Nekudim is like a psychological "breakdown" (resulting from the trauma of adolescence). Relative to the physiology of the human body this is like "death"; the lights ("soul") returns to its source, the broken vessels ("the physical body") falls into the lower realms of reality ("burial ground"). However, contained within the broken vessels are "sparks" of life-force which, though temporarily hidden insure the eventual "resurrection" of the broken vessels.

== The Emissaries who correspond to Nekudim ==
The lights of the world of Nekudim, which emanate from the "eyes" of Adam Kadmon, correspond to the spiritual soul-root of those souls of Israel whose primary goal and purpose in life is to act as a "messenger" or "emissary" of God and His Mashiach ("Anointed One") and bring the light and goodness of God in order to permeate all consciousness with the reality that "God is King of the Earth." According to this explanation, the meaning of the "breaking of the vessels" is that these first "messengers" did not succeed in their mission. Rather than recognizing that God alone rules over all of reality, each of these "kings" of Tohu (hinted to in the Torah as the Kings of Edom who rule before the kingdom of Israel) said "I shall rule," as taught at length in Kabbalah.

== See also ==
- Lurianic Kabbalah
- Tohu and Tikun
- Anthropomorphism in Kabbalah
