= Berudim =

The realm known as Berudim/Verudim/Olam HaBerudim (World of "Connection/Flecked") is one of the many spiritual worlds (Olamot) described by Kabbalah, as part of the order of development in Creation. Its significance emerges in Lurianic Kabbalah as a part of the process of Tohu and Tikun.

Berudim is the third of three stages to emerge from Adam Kadmon (Akudim, Nekudim, Berudim). Luria read these from the esoteric meaning of Jacob's breeding of Laban's flocks in Genesis 30:27–43. In Berudim the sephirot manifest as 10 inter-relating lights in 10 vessels, their harmony corresponding to Olam HaTikun (the "World of Rectification"), the archetype of Order in Creation. From Berudim emanates Atziluth (World of "Emanation"), the first of the comprehensive Four spiritual Realms and the origin of the Lower Worlds. In Atziluth, Partzufim complete the Upper rectification, while Below the Jewish people redeem the fallen sparks of the "World of Chaos" through Jewish observance.

== The source of the world of Berudim ==
The world of Berudim is formed from the lights that emanate metaphorically from the "forehead" of Adam Kadmon.

== Rectification in the world of Berudim ==
Berudim is also called Olam HaTikun (The "World of Rectification") as rectification of the sephirot begins there, which in Nekudim were isolated principles ("Chaos") causing the shattering of their vessels. Berudim is not completely repaired, but enough to allow ordered existence.

Chaos was caused by the sephirot acting in the scheme of independent Iggulim ("Circles"). In Berudim they begin to co-relate. Rectification is performed through the union of the Divine Names BaN (52, ב"ן – left column in the sephirot/Severity/Feminine) with MaH (45, מ"ה – central column/Mercy/Masculine), both emanating from the "forehead" of Adam Kadmon. Their union allows the sephirot to inter-relate in the stable three-column configuration of Kindness, Severity and Mercy. The 10 sephirot relate through each including latent aspects of the others. This subsequently allows the beginning of the construction of the first Partzufim (Divine "Configurations") in the World of Atziluth, where the sephirot act in the scheme of Yosher ("Upright"), complete harmonised faculties in the figurative form of Man.

== See also ==
- Lurianic Kabbalah
- Tohu and Tikun
- Anthropomorphism in Kabbalah
