= Akudim =

The realm known as Akudim/Olam Ha'Akudim (World of "Binding/Ringed") is one of the many spiritual worlds described by Kabbalah as being part of the order of development that God utilized to create the physical world. Its significance emerges in Lurianic Kabbalah, as a stage in the process of Tohu and Tikun.

Akudim (עֲקוּדִים in Hebrew) is the first world to result from Adam Kadmon ("Primordial Man"). Sfirot (Heavenly Attributes, depicted as lights) emanating from the eyes, ears, nose, mouth and forehead of Adam Kadmon interact with each other to create three sequential "worlds" containing combinations of fundamental heavenly attributes: Akudim, Nekudim and Berudim. Luria read these three terms from the esoteric meaning of Jacob's breeding of Laban's flocks in Genesis 30:27-43. The world of Akudim corresponds to Hiyuli (הִיּוּלִי, meaning "Potential" Creation). These three stages then interact to produce more "worlds" of increasing developmental complexity. The concepts of primordial man and his body are figurative rather than literal.

== The source of the world of Akudim ==
The world of Akudim is formed of the vapor that emanates from the "mouth" of Adam Kadmon.

== "Lights" and "Vessels" in the world of Akudim ==
In this world, all the ten Sefirot lights are bound within one vessel, hence then name "Akudim" (meaning "binding"). The lights, unable to "settle" well into the one vessel, enter into a "dynamic" referred to as מטי ולא מטי mati v'lo mati, literally "reaching and not reaching." The lights descend from the "mouth" of Adam Kadmon to enter the vessel of Akudim and then "about-face" to (partially) ascend back to their source in the "mouth" of Adam Kadmon, and so, back and forth forever.

== Expressions of Akudim in human beings ==
In a human being this is represented by a situation in which all of one's attributes, be they emotional or intellectual, have only one way to express themselves. One can compare this to an infant who possesses the sole medium of "crying" (or a single word) that he can utilize to express his myriad attributes.

== See also ==
- Lurianic Kabbalah
- Tohu and Tikun
- Anthropomorphism in Kabbalah
