= Yeridat ha-dorot =

Concept in Rabbinic and Orthodox Judaism

Yeridat ha-dorot (Hebrew: ירידת הדורות), meaning literally "the decline of the generations", or nitkatnu ha-dorot (נתקטנו הדורות), meaning "the diminution of the generations", is a concept in classical Rabbinic Judaism and contemporary Orthodox Judaism expressing a belief in the intellectual inferiority of subsequent, and contemporary Torah scholarship and spirituality in comparison to that of the past. It is held to apply to the transmission of the "Revealed" (nigleh) aspects of Torah study, embodied in the legal and homiletic Talmud, and other mainstream rabbinic literature scholarship. Its reasoning derives from the weaker claim to authoritative traditional interpretation of scripture, in later stages of a lengthening historical chain of transmission from the original revelation of the Torah at Mount Sinai, and the codification of the Oral Torah in the Talmud. This idea provides the basis to the designated Rabbinic Eras from the Tannaim and Amoraim of the Talmud, to the subsequent Gaonim, Rishonim and Acharonim. Additionally, it has an extra metaphysical explanation in Kabbalah, regarding lower levels of souls in succeeding generations.

However, Kabbalah limits the effect of Yeridat ha-dorot only to nigleh. In contrast, the "Concealed" (nistar) aspects of Torah, embodied in Jewish mysticism, are identified with an opposite process of successively higher articulations of mystical thought as the process of history unfolds. The reasoning for this derives from the notion that Jewish mysticism progresses instead from successive new divine revelations to supreme mystics, as the only way to deepen its conceptual structures. This paradoxical dialectic relates in Kabbalistic terminology to descending immanent "Vessels", and successively higher transcendent "Lights" through the history of creation. In Jewish thought, deepening Talmudic and Rationalist enquiry broadens the physical application of Torah (vessels), while deepening Jewish mysticism draws down higher levels of illumination (light).

== In Classic Rabbinic literature ==
One of the first expressions of the idea appears in the Talmudic adage found in Shabbos 112b (Soncino):

R. Zera said in Raba bar Zimuna's name: If the earlier [scholars] were sons of angels, we are sons of men; and if the earlier [scholars] were sons of men, we are like asses...

The idea is found in many other classical Jewish sources, and underlies the reluctance of the Torah scholars in a particular generation to challenge the legal rulings of a previous generation. Weiss-Halivni (1993) discusses the relationship between the principle of yeridat ha-dorot and the seemingly contrary principle of chate'u Yisrael ("Israel sinned," referring to a failure in transmission of the tradition), an idea invoked to explain cases where derash (exegetical interpretation) trumps peshat (plain reading) in order to restore original intent.

== Eras of Rabbinic Judaism ==
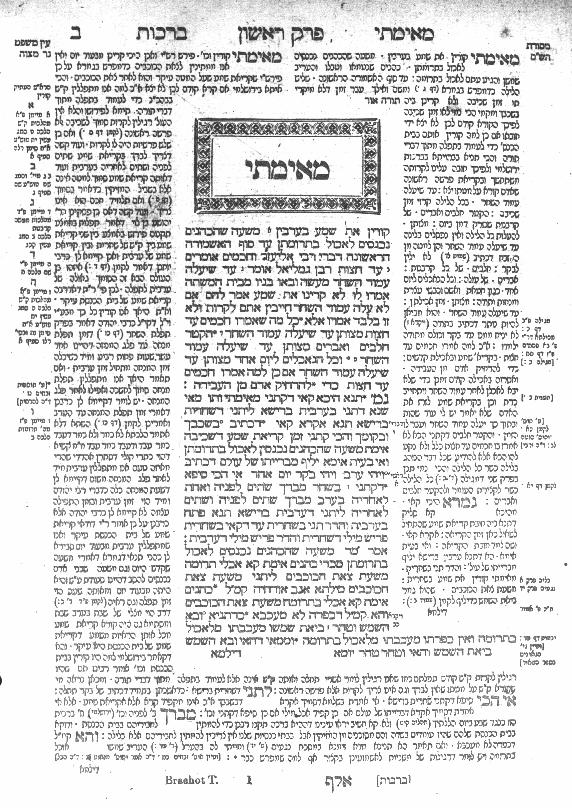
First page of the Babylonian Talmud, tractate Berachot

Rabbinic tradition divides its historical development into distinct eras. According to traditional interpretation, scholars in one era within Halachic development (legal codification of Jewish observance) do not challenge the rulings of previous-era scholars.

Chazal is an acronym for "Chachameinu Zichronam Livracha" ("Our Sages may their memory be blessed"). In Rabbinic writings this refers to all Sages of the Talmud and other Rabbinic literature commentators, from the times of the Second Temple of Jerusalem until the sixth century. Up until the end of the Savoraim era, Chazal had the authority to commentate the Torah according to the Talmudical Hermeneutics standards required by the law given to Moses at Sinai (The non written laws handed to Moses at Sinai). Nowadays, this authority is not delegated to the current generation's Sages, and thus the Torah can not be commentated on, in matters concerning the Halakha, if it is in contradiction to Chazal's commentary. Earlier on, up until the midst of the Tannaim era, when there was a Sanhedrin (a Jewish law court), Chazal had also the authority to decree predestinations and to enact new religious regulations, in any matter they saw fit, concerning issues that were not included in the written "Torah", or were not handed at Biblical Mount Sinai.

Rishonim ("the first ones") were the leading Rabbis and Poskim (Halachic decisors) who lived approximately during the 11th to 15th centuries, in the era before the writing of the Shulkhan Arukh (Code of Jewish Law) and following the Geonim. Rabbinic scholars subsequent to the Shulkhan Arukh are known as Acharonim ("the latter ones"). The distinction between Rishonim and Geonim is meaningful historically; in Halakha (Jewish Law) the distinction is less important. According to a widely held view in Orthodox Judaism, Acharonim generally cannot dispute the rulings of Rabbis of previous eras unless they find support of other Rabbis in previous eras. On the other hand, this view is not formally a part of Halakhah itself. Acharonim is a term used in Jewish law and history, to signify the leading Rabbis and Poskim living from roughly the 16th century to the present. The publication of the Shulkhan Arukh marks the transition from the era of the Rishonim to the Acharonim. The question of which prior rulings can and cannot be disputed has led to efforts to define which rulings are within the Acharonim era with precision. According to many Rabbis the Shulkhan Arukh is from an Acharon. Some hold that Rabbi Yosef Karo's Beit Yosef has the Halakhic status of a work of a Rishon, while his later Shulkhan Arukh has the status of a work of an Acharon.

The 18th century Vilna Gaon was one of the most influential Rabbinic authorities since the Middle Ages; although he is counted among the Acharonim, he is held by many authorities after him as belonging to the Rishonim.

== Generational ascent in Kabbalah ==
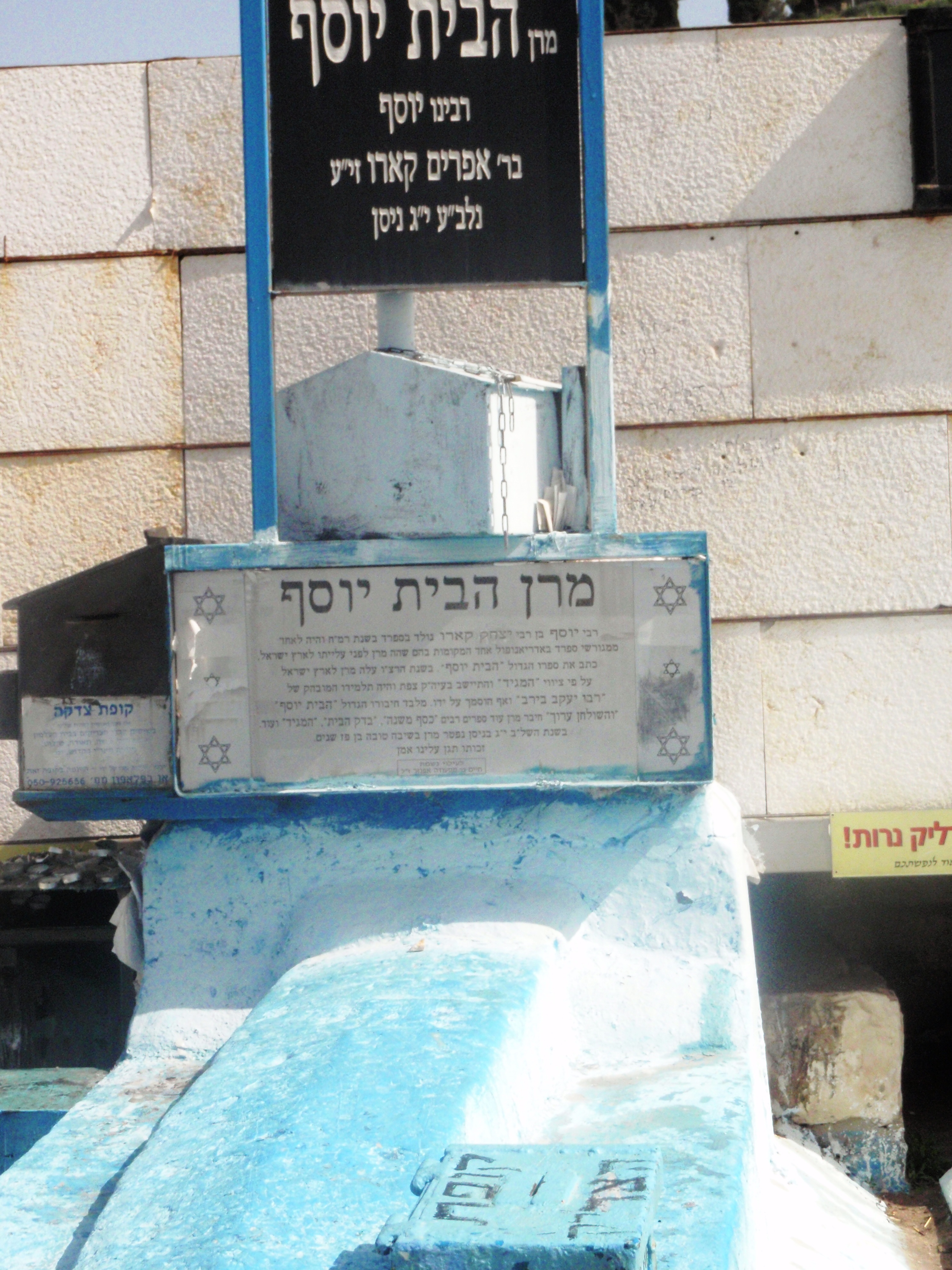
Grave of Yosef Karo, central Halachic author of the Shulchan Aruch and leading mystic of 16th century Safed. Kabbalah emphasises the ultimate significance of practical observance and Talmudic study

Kabbalah tends to support the Halachic notion of the Descent of the Generations, by relating it to a metaphysical structure of descending levels of souls in each subsequent generation. Through processes such as Gilgul (Reincarnation), all souls are held to derive from the original collective soul of Adam. As the Sephirot relate the powers of the soul metaphorically to the image of Man, so the souls of Israel derive from different aspects of Adam; supreme Tzadikim who lead the community from his "head", down to simple souls of his "feet". In this way, the latter generations when the "Heels of the Messiah" can be heard approaching, relate to their low souls from the level of Adam's "Heel".

However, at the same time, Kabbalah tends to explain an opposite process of progressively increasing Divine Ohr ("Light"). This light may be said to increasingly illuminate creation in each subsequent generation. In relation to Jewish scholarship, this dialectic process is connected to the mystical concept of the Tzadik. While the en masse community of souls of Israel in each generation are lower, the most supreme Tzadikim of the generations are unaffected by this limitation. In traditional view, Talmudic and Halachic study (Nigleh-"Revealed" aspects of Judaism) uncovers new interpretations of previously revealed Scriptural and Rabbinic texts. Consequently, this scholarship is affected by diminishing authority of latter generations to disagree with earlier codification. However, Kabbalistic (Nistar-"Concealed") scholarship advances with successive new descriptive articulations, through a progressive process of revelation of new doctrines by select supreme Tzadikim. In this picture, Nigleh, affected by Yeridot HaDorot, involves the ascent of human intellect up to God. The new articulations of Nistar by rare Tzadikim involve the descent of new, successively higher Divine intellect into man's conceptual understanding. Where Halacha descends generationally through time, Kabbalah ascends generationally.

=== Chabad interpretation ===
According to Rabbi Yitzchak Ginsburgh, a contemporary Chabad-Lubavitch leader, the three successive stages of mid-16th century Cordoveran Kabbalah, latter-16th century Lurianic Kabbalah, and 18th century Hasidic philosophy may be understood as three ascending levels of mystical perception and relationship to God in Kabbalah:

"There are three distinct stages in the historical revelation of Kabbalah. Each represents a conceptual approach to understanding Kabbalistic tradition. Each is identified with a particular historical figure. Rabbi Moshe Cordevero, also known as the Ramak; Rabbi Isaac Luria, popularly referred to as the holy Ari; and Rabbi Yisrael Baal Shem Tov. Each system of thought served to advance the evolution of Kabbalistic theory by providing new and more illuminating frameworks within which to organize the totality of Kabbalistic doctrine existing up to their time."

In ascending order:

Stage of Kabbalistic teaching:	Date:	Relative level:	Divine characteristic:
Cordoveran Kabbalah	Mid 1500s	Olamot-Worlds	Hishtalshelut-Evolution
Lurianic Kabbalah	1570s and after	Neshamot-Souls	Hitlavshut-Enclothement
Hasidic philosophy	18th century and after	Elokut-Divinity	Hashra'ah-Omnipresence

While Lurianic Kabbalah completed the full, transcendent structure of traditional Jewish metaphysics, this explanation places the Hasidic philosophical focus on Omnipresent Divine immanence as the culmination of Kabbalistic thought. Where Kabbalah remained restricted to elite circles, Hasidic Divine Unity could likewise offer the first popularisation of mysticism to both elite scholars and unlearned common folk, offering to each new soulful directions.

== In contemporary Judaism ==
The concept of Yeridat ha-dorot is particularly influential in Haredi Judaism, which regards not only Halakha but even customs of old as possessing divine inspiration and wisdom which later generations cannot match. Modern Orthodox Judaism has a somewhat ambivalent approach to the concept, believing that classical positions can sometimes be re-examined in light of modern circumstances but deferentially, and in accordance with classical rules of interpretation, while embracing modern science and secular learning.

The Conservative movement is a pluralistic movement which accepts multiple positions about the degree of deference to tradition in contemporary thought and decision-making. The Conservative movement has not expressly rejected the concept of yeridat ha-dorot, though Conservative authorities may sometimes view modern concepts of morality as superior to ancient concepts.

Reform Judaism and Reconstructionist Judaism, as modern liberal movements, reject the whole idea as incompatible with progress, liberalism, and modernity.

== See also ==
- Declinism

== Sources ==
- Kellner, Menachem Marc (1996), Maimonides on the "Decline of the Generations" and the Nature of Rabbinic Authority, New York: State University of New York Press, ISBN 0791429229
- Weiss-Halivni, David (1993), "From midrash to mishna: Theological repercussions and further clarifications of "Chate'u Yisrael"", in Fishbane, Michael (ed.), The Midrashic Imagination: Jewish Exegesis, Thought, and History, Albany, NY: SUNY Press, pp. 23–44
