= Ibbur =

One of the transmigration forms of the soul

Ibbur (Hebrew: עִבּוּר, romanized: ʿibbur, lit. 'pregnancy, impregnation, or incubation'), is one of the forms of transmigration of the soul and has similarities with gilgul neshamot "reincarnation of souls" in Rabbinic Judaism.

ʿIbbur is the most positive form of possession and the most complicated. In contrast, possession by a dybbuk (Yiddish: דיבוק, romanized: angry dead soul or spirit) is highly adverse and requires exorcism. It happens when a righteous soul decides to occupy a living person's body for a time, and joins, or spiritually "impregnates" the existing soul. ʿIbbur is always temporary; the possessed person may not know it has occurred. An ʿibbur is often believed to require consent from the possessed. The reason for an ʿibbur is always benevolent—the departed soul wishes to complete an important task, to fulfil a promise, or to perform a mitzvah (a religious duty) that can only be accomplished in the flesh. In Lurianic Kabbalah, ʿibbur occurs when an incomplete soul that cannot achieve tiqqun ("rectification") is completed by the addition of the soul of a tzadik "saint". Luria believed this to be possible even if the possessor were still alive.

== Fictional representations ==
- Richard Zimler, The Warsaw Anagrams, New York: The Overlook Press, 2011, ISBN 978-1-59020-088-9 (an historical novel set in the Warsaw Ghetto and narrated by an Ibbur). According to the San Francisco Chronicle, Zimler's novel, "Deserves a place among the most important works of Holocaust literature."
- Gérald Tenenbaum, "Par la racine", Paris:Cohen & Cohen, 2023, ISBN 978-2-36749-106-6 (a novel set in France and at Haïfa, referring to the characters of the Ibbur and the Dibbuk).

== Bibliography ==
- Gershom Scholem Major Trends in Jewish Mysticism, New York: Schocken, 1961. ISBN 0-8052-0005-3
- Gershom Scholem Kabbalah, New York: Dorset Press, 1987. ISBN 0-88029-205-9
- Howard Schwartz Lilith's Cave: Jewish Tales of the Supernatural, Oxford University Press, 1991. ISBN 978-0-19-506726-2
