= Cadmon =

Cadmon may refer to:

- Cædmon
- Adam Kadmon
