= Shaar HaGilgulim =

Kabbalistic work on Gilgul

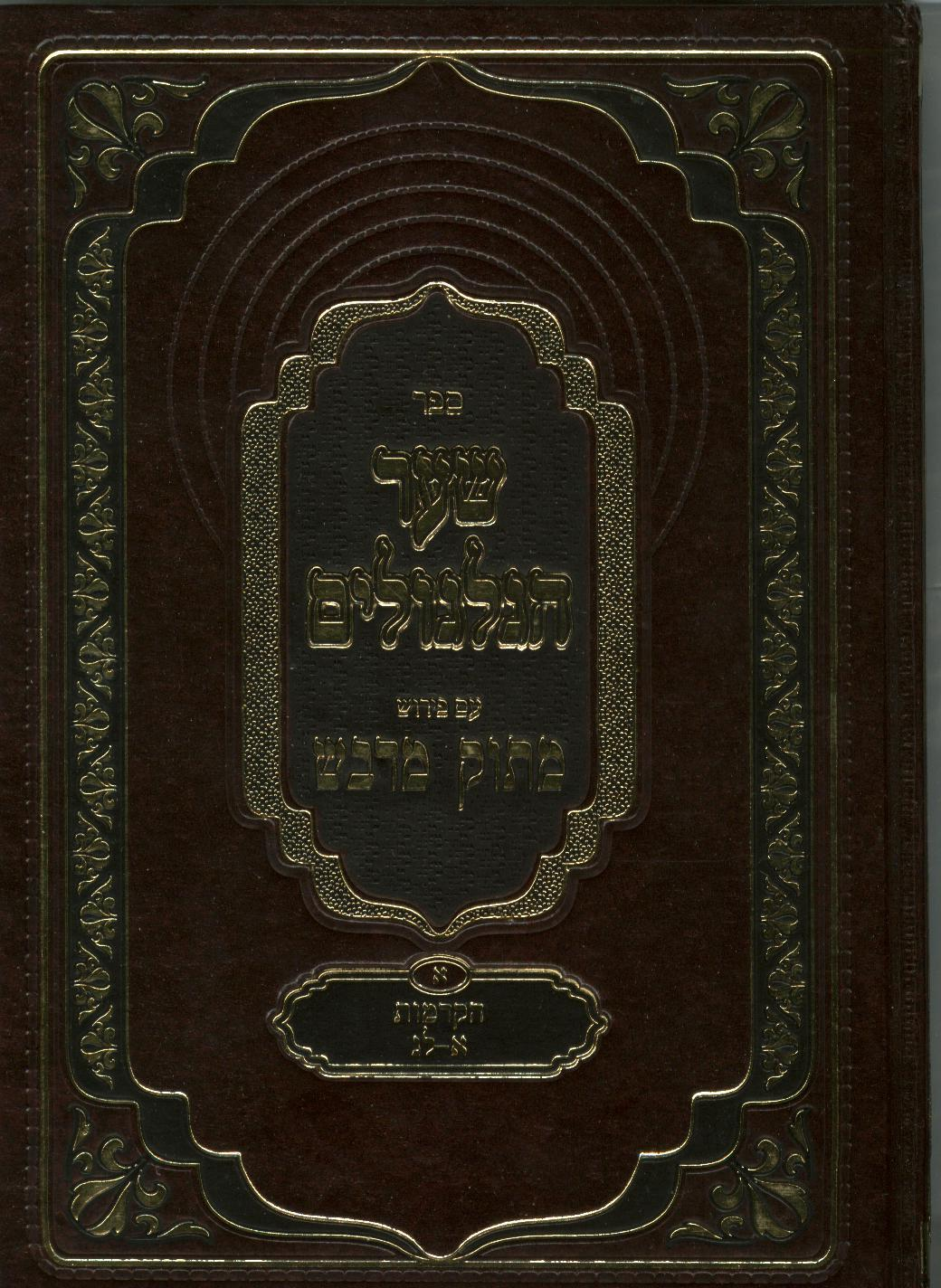

Sha'ar ha Gilgulim (Hebrew: שער הגלגולים) or Gate of Reincarnations is a kabbalistic work on gilgul, the concept of reincarnation, assembled by Hayyim Vital, who recorded the teachings of his master Isaac Luria in the 16th century.

== Authors ==
Based primarily on the Zohar, specifically the section "Mishpatim", where gilgulim are discussed, it also borrows heavily from the teachings of Isaac Luria (1534-1572). The book was composed by Luria's disciple Hayyim Vital and amended by his son, Shmuel Vital, as a section or "gate," of the primary Kabbalistic text Etz Hayim.

== Contents ==
As well as outlining principles of personal rectification or tikkun and reincarnation, this work describes the spiritual roots of many of the great Torah scholars of the past. Furthermore, it often provides information about the future in terms of predicting challenges to be expected throughout Jewish history and particularly the End of Days.
