= Seder hishtalshelus =

Chabad philosophy

In Kabbalistic and Hasidic philosophy, seder hishtalshelut (Hebrew: סדר השתלשלות, romanized: sēḏer hištalšeluṯ, lit. 'Order of Creation', Yiddish: סדר השתלשלות, romanized: seyder hishtalshéyles) refers to the chain-like descent of the Four Worlds between God and Creation. Each spiritual world denotes a complete realm of existence, resulting from its general proximity or distance to divine revelation. Each realm is also a form of consciousness reflected in this world through the psychology of the soul. Kabbalah is concerned with defining the esoteric nature, particularly the partzufim or divine manifestations or personas, as well as the functional role of each level between the infinite and the finite. Each spiritual realm embodies a creative stage God uses to go from his self to the creation of the physical world, the material Universe being the end of the chain and the only physical realm. Hasidic thought applies the Kabbalistic scheme to its concern of perceiving divine omnipresence in this material world. In this, Hasidism varies in its use of Kabbalah, Mainstream-Hasidism avoiding Kabbalistic focus, while Chabad thought explains seder hishtalshelut concerning man's psychology. In contrast to the functional aim of Kabbalah, this contemplates seder hishtalshelut as a vehicle for relating to the divine unity with creation. "Seder Hishtalshelut" is sometimes used restrictively to refer to the emergent Created Order, the Four Worlds. More broadly, all preceding levels are included, as their function underlies existence. This page lists and links to all the main spiritual levels described in Lurianic Kabbalah, the scheme of Isaac Luria (1534–1572), the basis of modern Jewish mysticism. Its listing incorporated, expanded and explained earlier Medieval/Classical Kabbalah. After Luria, esoteric Kabbalists broadened their explanation within the Lurianic listing. The supra-rational doctrines of Luria described the Chokmah levels of divinity (tzimtzum and the shattering) that preceded the "rationally" perceived Bina levels of Medieval Kabbalah and Moses ben Jacob Cordovero. In turn, the Habad Hasidic exploration described Keter (will) levels of Divine intention that preceded Creation.

== The Upper Unity ==
=== Or Ein Sof ===
Preparatory stages in Or Ein Sof "God's Infinite Light" before the beginning of the creative process. The Or Ein Sof is a paradoxical form of divine self-revelation. These are above any world/limitation. Kabbalah considered whether Ein Sof represents God's divine essence or God as First Cause. Chabad philosophy explores atzmut or divine essence in the purpose of Creation. Ten stages of God's Infinite Light in Kabbalistic terminology before the beginning of Creation:

- Atzmuth)
- Yachid "Single"
- Echad "One"
- Sha'ashuim Atzmi'im "Delights of Self"
- Aliyat Haratzon "Ascent of the Will"
- Ana Emloch "Primordial Thought"
- Ein Sof "No End". This is a term for the Unknowable God in Kabbalah, God as infinite life source continuously sustaining all Creation into Existence, above Being and Non-Being, reciprocally becoming through the totality of Creation by the divine souls of Anthropos)
- Kadmon
- Avir Kadmon "Primordial Atmosphere"
- Adam Kadma'ah Stima'ah "Concealed Primordial Man", God's will for Creation before the tzimtzum

=== Tzimtzum ===
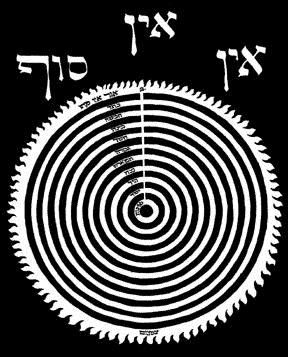
Metaphorical diagram of the Kav thin line of light descending from the Ohr Ein Sof into the Khalal vacuum to emanate the concealed 10 sephirot in Adam Kadmon

There were three stages of the Sod HaTzimtzum "Secret of Contraction" taught in the new doctrines of Lurianic Kabbalah. These received differing interpretations after Luria, from the literal to the metaphorical. In this dynamic myth, the first act in Creation was Divine Self-Withdrawal, the opposite of Creative revelation. Tzimtzum is a paradox as Creation depends on God also being present in the vacuum and resulting existence:

- Tzimtzum, the self-withdrawal of God's Infinite Light to create the Ḥālāl "Vacuum"
- Reshimu "Impression": Light left behind in the vacuum, the Residue
- Ḥālāl (חָלָל "Empty space"), the emptiness
- Kav "Line/Ray", new divine light radiated into the primordial emptiness
- Avir "Space, Ether": Where divine light, created precisely by God, took shape in creation and creatures or was sublimated in the spiritual modalities of the angels and the souls of living beings (see hyle). A cause of his spiritual nature, Avir is related to Adam and Eve before the original sin, but in natural science, avir is a modality about the orbital mechanism of constellations and silica in the esoteric traditions of Eastern Europe. The "celestial green color"is the first iridescence of Jupiter. In the more accessible Halakhah, all this corresponds to the tzitzit of the tallit: the tekhelet of the threads.
- Shevirat HaKelim ("Distinctions") creation, World by World.

=== Adam Kadmon ===
Adam Kadmon ("Primordial Man" or "Anthropos"), an anthropomorphic term, is the revelation of the divine will for creation after the tzimtzum. Its paradoxical nature is expressed as both Adam (creation) and Kadmon ("primary" divinity). As the will of Keter, it is pure light, with no vessels, bounded by its future potential to create vessels. It is sometimes counted as the first of the Five Worlds, but its supreme transcendence is before the emergence of the sephiroth and the shattering of their vessels:

- Ratzon Kadum ("Original Desire")
- Adam Kadmon ("Primordial Man")
- Orot Ozen-Chotem-Peh (Five "lights from the eyes, ears, nose, mouth and forehead" of Adam Kadmon)

=== Akudim, Nekudim, Berudim ===
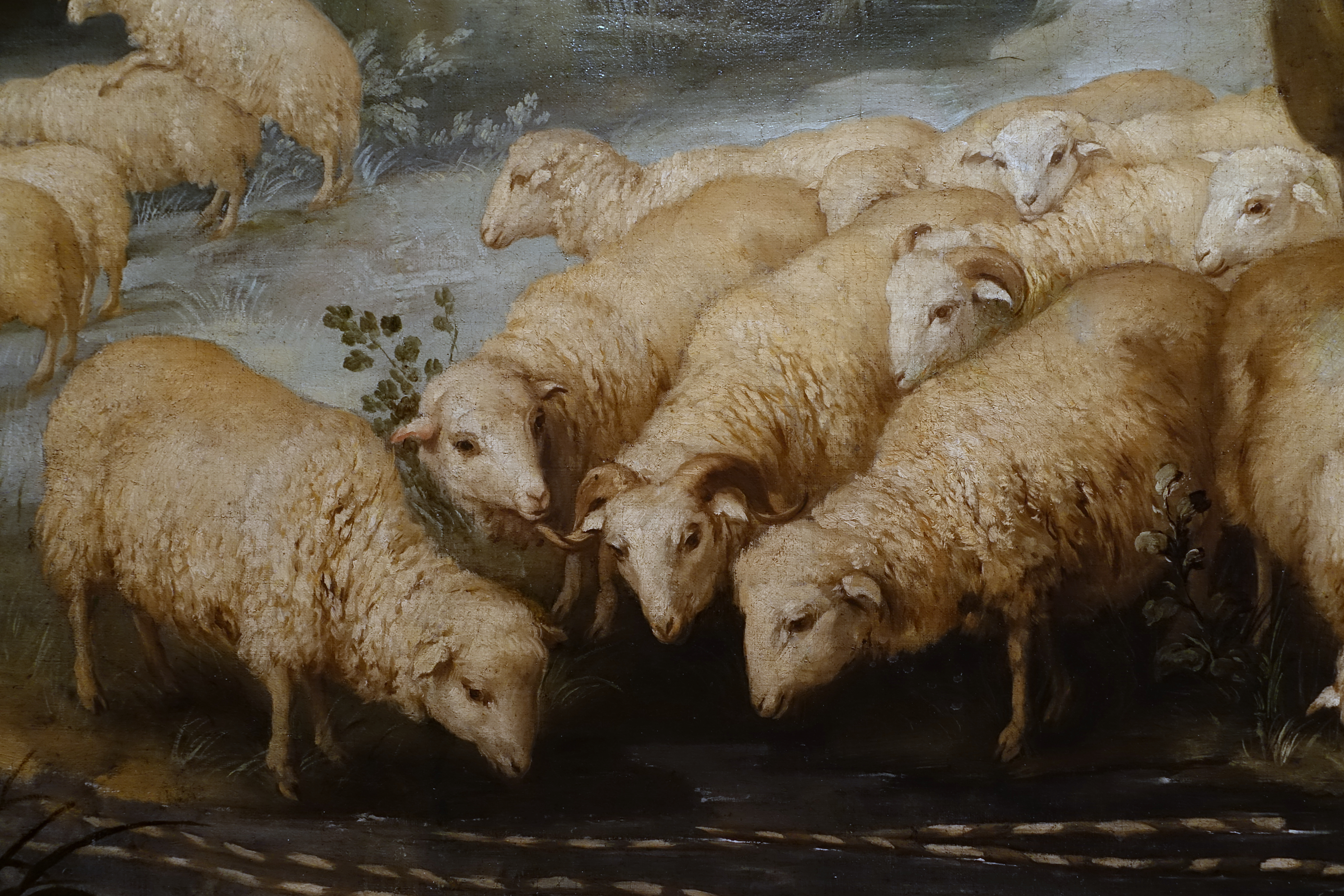
Jacob tending Laban's flocks in Genesis 30 using sympathetic magic, the esoteric source in Kabbalah for the worlds of Akudim Ringed, Nekudim Spotted, Berudim Flecked

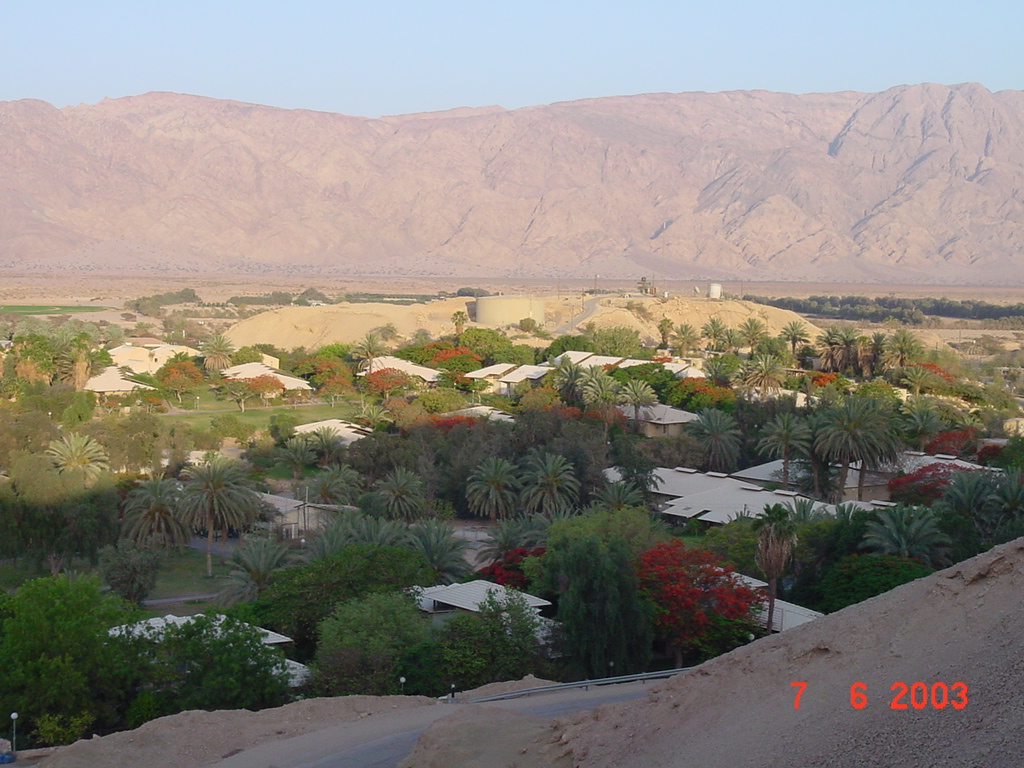
The 8 Kings of Edom before any King of Israel in Genesis 36 are esoteric symbols in Kabbalah for Shevirat HaKeilim primordial eight sephirot that broke

Three Worlds of "lights" and "vessels" resulted from the interacting lights that emanated from Adam Kadmon in Lurianic Kabbalah. Each embodies different stages in the emergence of the ten sephiroth. Their progression corresponds to the archetypal realms of Tohu and Tikun (Chaos and Rectification) described in the new doctrines of Luria. Tohu caused the shattering of the sephirot vessels, the catastrophic exile in creation:

- Akudim: ten lights in one vessel - Stable Tohu
- Nekudim: ten isolated lights in ten vessels - Unstable Tohu
- Berudim: ten interrelated lights in ten vessels - beginning of Tikun

=== Keter of Atzilut ===
Diagram of the Partzufim countenances, Reishin heads, and Dikna beard Divine aspects configurations in Atziluth

The world of Atziluth is the first of the comprehensive Four Worlds, collectively the realm of rectifying the vessels shattered by Chaos. Atzilut completes the Upper rectification, which began in Berudim, through the sephirot transforming into personas or "countenances" of the divine. The personas harmonise the sephiroth in fully-interacting configurations in the form of Man. The rectification of Atzilut begins with the rectification of its Keter "Crown". Eight rectification stages in the Crown:

- Ancient of Days: the upper partsuph of Keter
- Arich Anpin, the lower partsuph of Keter
- Reisha D'lo Ityada "Unknowable Head"
- Reisha d'Ayin "Head of Nothingness"
- Reisha d'Arich "Head of Infinity"
- Gulgalta "Skull", the Keter of the Arich Anpin
- Mocha Stima'ah "Concealed Brain", the origin of ḥokhma "Wisdom" of the Arich Anpin
- Diqna "Beard": contracts the light of the Arich Anpin through the Thirteen Attributes of Mercy

=== Atziluth ===
The ten personas after Keter rectified the first world, Atziluth. Each of the six primary and twelve secondary personas corresponds to the ten sephiroth arranged around one of their numbers. The interaction of the personas rectifies Atziluth eternally, completing the upper rectification. Redemption of the fallen sparks by the Anthropos rectifies the time-connected three lower Worlds Below. Atziluth is separated from the three independent lower worlds by its exclusive consciousness of divine unity without self-awareness. The infinite insight of Hokmah predominates beyond intellectual grasp. Creation from Nothing is seen from the view of Ayin, "Nothingness", realising its non-existence in the Bitul ha-Atzmit "Nullification of Essence"—the world of the Anthropos (sephiroth and personas).

- Abba "Father", persona of Hokhma
- Imma "Mother", persona of Bina
- Abba Ila'ah ("Higher Father") Upper secondary persona of Chokhmah
- Imma Ila'ah ("Higher Mother") Upper secondary persona of Bina
- Yisrael Sabba "Israel the Elder": Jacob in the Hebrew Bible, lower secondary persona of Hokhma
- Tevuna ("Comprehension") Lower secondary persona of Bina
- Zeir Anpin Jewish Babylonian Aramaic: זְעֵיר אַנפִּין, romanized: zʿer anpin, lit. 'Short Countenance': General persona of Emotions
- Nukva d-Ze'ir Anpin: Jewish Babylonian Aramaic: נקבה דזעיר אנפִין, romanized: nuqbā ḏzʿer anpin "Female of Short Countenance" General persona of Malkuth
- Leah: first wife of Jacob, the upper secondary persona of Malkhut
- Rachel: second wife of Jacob, lower secondary persona of Malkhut

The ten sephiroth shine in the Four Worlds; the last sephira of a World, Malkuth, becomes the first sephira, the Crown, of the next Realm. The Malkuth of Atzilut, called "God's speech," the source of prophecy, is the general source of independent creation.

- World of Atsiluth

== The Lower Unity ==
The beginning of self-aware ego, the spiritual worlds perceiving themselves to exist, as created realms independent from God, despite the ultimate illusion of this. The worlds can only reach Bitul Ha-Yesh (Nullification of Being), not the Bitul Ha-Atzmis (Nullification of Essence) characterised by Atzilut.

=== Beriah ===
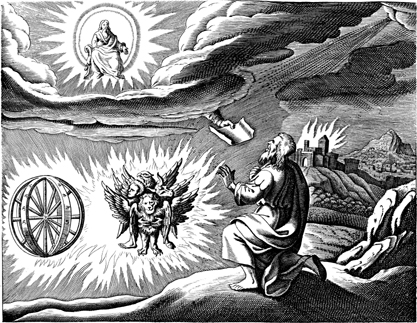
Hebrew prophets envisioned the Throne of God of Beriah with angelic retinue. In Kabbalah Isaiah 6 saw from Beriah, Ezekiel 1 saw from Yetzirah

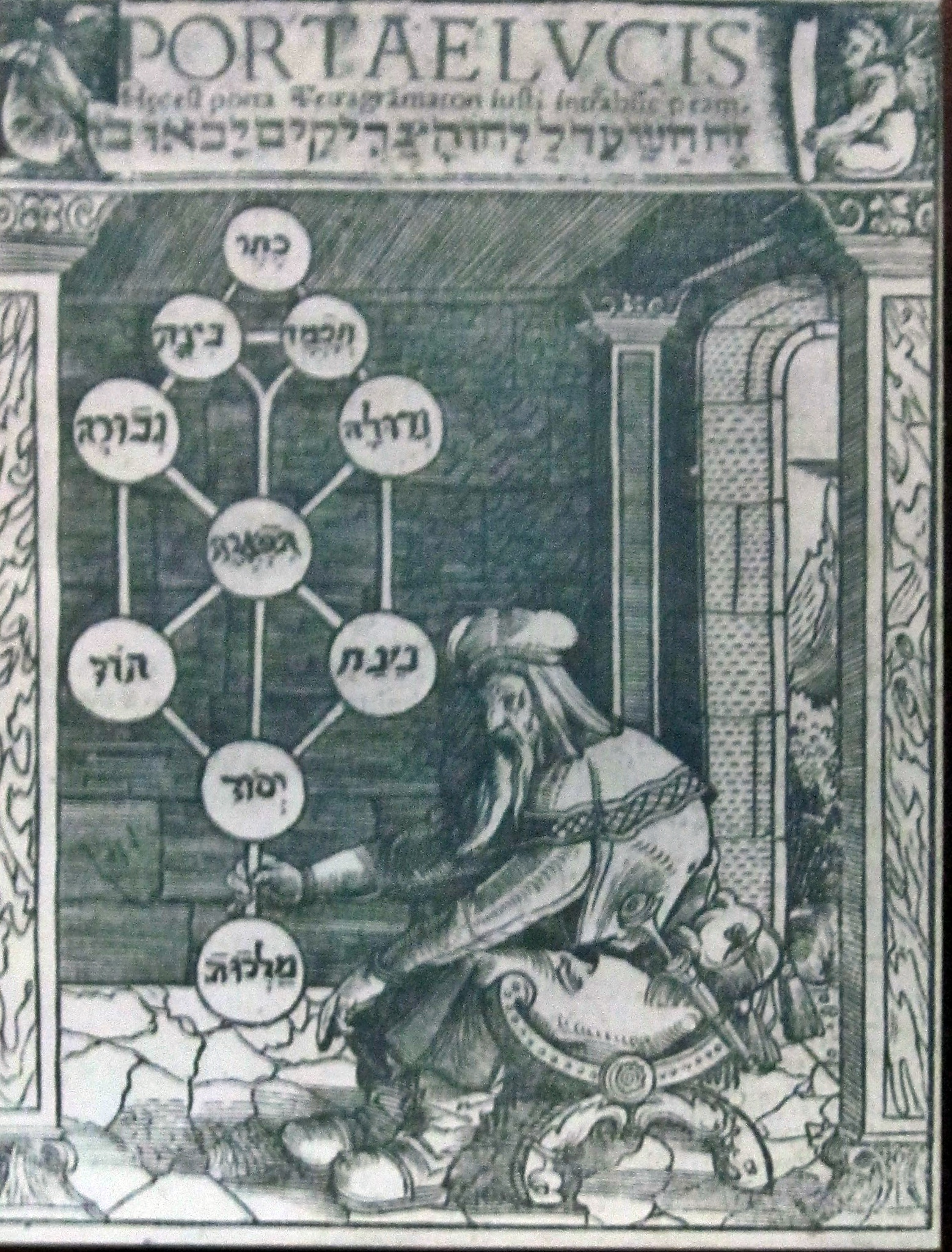
Contemplation of Divine emanations in Theosophical Kabbalah enables the advantage of the esoteric scholar over the prophet's visions in cognitive understanding of higher levels of Divinity

The roots of Creation in the Divine mind. Binah (Divine Understanding) predominates, the intellect taking measured grasp of the Divine transcendence and remoteness of God above Beriah. The world of the Throne of God, metaphorically where the Divine Anthropos of Atzilut descends ("sitting") to rule independent Creation from above.

- Olam Ha'Beriah (the "World of Creation")

=== Yetzirah ===
Archetypal Creation. Zeir Anpin (Divine Emotions) predominate. The world of the angels who serve God with emotional self-nullification.

- Olam Ha'Yetzirah (the "World of Formation")

=== Asiyah ===
Particular pluralist Creation. Malkuth (Divine Rulership) predominates. Asiyah is a spiritual world, but with a lower physical aspect (our Universe).

- Olam Ha'Asiyah (the "World of Action")

=== Asiyah Gashmit ===
Our physical Universe. Enclothes the last two sephirot Yesod and Malkuth of Spiritual Asiyah.

- Asiyah Gashmit ("Physical Action")

== Analogies for Seder Hishtalshelut ==
The basic stations of this process from above to below are:

- Atzmus Ohr Ein Sof before the Tzimtzum ("The Essence of the Infinite Light before the Contraction")
- The Tzimtzum ("The Contraction")
- The Reshimu ("The Impression")
- The Kav ("Line of Light")
- Ratzon Kadum ("Original Desire")
- Adam Kadmon ("Original Man")
- Atziluth ("World of Emanation")
- The Masach ("The Curtain")
- Beriah ("World of Creation")
- Yetzirah ("World of Formation")
- Assiah ("World of Action")

Although these are the basic stations, each level contains innumerable details. To understand Seder Hishtalshelus properly, one must first understand how all of the analogies exist in a person. Once one has understood this, one can begin to see how all of these levels exist in the world. Then, one will be able to take any event or aspect of creation and trace it up the chain to God Himself, then back down to the original view and see how God is literally here with us, relating to us directly through his creations.

The purpose of learning about Seder Hishtalshelus in Hasidic thought is not merely to know about many distinct levels, rather, the purpose is to see how all the levels in between us and God are transparent and irrelevant, and in truth God is relating to us directly, and there is "none besides for Him". (Deuteronomy 4:35) Because of this, the Tanya states that learning about the Seder Hishtalshelus will bring a person to a "complete heart".

This is much like two friends talking on the phone. There are many stages one's voice must undergo before it reaches the other. Yet, the two people are talking to each other, not to their phones. The stages in between become irrelevant and transparent in such a situation.

One can understand these levels through the analogy of a man who wants a house. The hishtalshelus is generally broken down into two general stages, called the "Upper Unity" and the "Lower Unity". Below are the relevant analogies for all the basic stations of the hishtalshelus in the analogy of a man who wants a house starting from the top (primordial desires) and going down (until the desire is actualized).

- Atzmut Ohr Ein Sof Lifnei Hatzimtzum ("Essence of the Infinite Light before the Contraction"):
  The analogy for this stage is the essence of the person's soul. At this stage we are dealing with only the person himself, who at this point has no revealed desire for a house or any other physical object. However, since he is human, we must say that at some point he will desire a house because this is part of human nature. At this stage, however, this desire doesn't have any independent existence at all, but is simply a part of his soul.
- Tzimtzum and Reshimu ("Contraction and Impression"):
  At this stage there is still no revealed desire for a house. However, the person realizes that his ultimate desire will be to express his true self through things that are separate from himself, such as through music, art, a house, etc. Those decisions have not yet been made, however. There is only the realization that one will want to express his true self by making something that appears separate from him, express him. This is similar to the way one might want the challenge of playing an instrument, which is something separate from a person, and allow himself to be expressed through it. Reshimu means impression, because at this stage the person realizes that he will not be able to express himself directly, but his self will somehow leave its own impression on the things he does so he can be seen through them.
- Kav ("Measuring Line"):
  This is the part of the person that connects the Tzimtzum and Reshimu to the Infinite Light before the Tzimtzum. The analogy for The Kav is the person's judgement. In life, whatever choices a person makes, will be free choices made by the person, without influence from those around him. Even small and seemingly insignificant choices, such as what one decides to order at a restaurant, still express his essence, because they are 'his' choices, and are his way of expressing himself. If one looks carefully at a person's choices one can see how they bring across his unique taste and personality. At this point there is still no revealed desire for a house, but only the subconscious framework that will eventually be used when he begins to desire one.
- Ratzon Kadum ("Original Desire"):
  Now that person is most likely older, he begins to feel a desire for independence and belonging. This is one particular expression of his original desire to express himself. But now it is specific to wanting a sense of contentment and a feeling of being at "home". At this point, he still does not desire a home, but wishes for the happiness gained when one gains a house. Technically he could still express this desire in other ways than having a house, such as interacting with friends or participating in activities which he enjoys and achieve that same sense of belonging and contentment. There are still no details yet of how the desire for belonging will be fulfilled.
- Adam Kadmon (A"K-"Primordial Man"):
  The person now looks at the outside world for the first time. Up until this point, he was only thinking about himself, and his desires. Now, in order to bring out this desire to practicality, he must decide what in the physical world will fit these desires. He creates a world image, i.e., a picture of what is going on in the world. He then decides where in this mental picture he belongs. He eventually realizes that the best way to integrate into society is to possess a house, and will choose a house that fits his particular character in order to best express himself. The kind of house he will want has been limited at this point due to his still ignorant outlook on the world and the very basic ideas of his own personality. However, he still does not truly desire a physical house. Rather, it is that he has realized his own desires and needs and now knows the best type of "house" that would suit him.
- Keter of Atzilut ("Crown of the World of Emanation"):
  This stage is what results from the associations created in A"K, namely, a particular desire for a particular house. This stage is mainly composed of two concepts: Arich Anpin-Outer/Chitzoneyus of Keter: Desire for this particular house; and Atik Yomin-Inner/Pnimiyus of Keter: The pleasure he receives in knowing that this will express who he is.
- Atzilut ("World of Emanation"):
  A"K already included all the details of the levels below it. However, the actual details only come out as needed. Now he knows the way he will express himself will be specifically through a house. At this stage he may sit down with his wife, or real estate agent, and clarifies exactly how he wants his house to be. This stage includes Chochma (Wisdom) of Aztilus which is when he creates the general picture of what he wants in the abstract, "a warm home". Binah (Understanding) of Atzilus involves figuring out what are the components of such a home; everything he wants the house to be with all their details. In A"K he only knew what types of homes are appropriate with what kind of person. Here he actually decides where he will fit into the picture. Here he also decides what is practical based on how much money he has and what is available etc. Based on all of these things he comes up with the Zeir Anpin (Z"A-"the Small Face"-Emotions) of Atzilus: This stage is the picture of what things are good and what are bad. Here he sets up what things will bring him closer to his goal (his dream house) and what things will bring him further. He will have Chesed (a love) for things he will like. He will have Gevurah (a fear or hate) for things he will not like. He will have Tiferet (Beauty) for the compromises he makes (or the beauty that results) and Netzach (feeling of victory in spite of challenges) to want to go and get what he wants, and the Hod to not settle for something less than he wants. He will have a Yesod, which forms the compromise of how he will actually interact with everyone resulting from the interplay between his Netzach and Hod. This results in Malchut ("Kingdom" or actualization), which is the stage at which he will talk to himself about what he likes and doesn't like. And he will talk about what he is actually going to do. Finally, all of the above will lead to his creation of his Malchus of Atzilus i.e. he will actually tell the real estate agent what he wants, what he will settle for and what he will not, what he likes, hates, etc. The desires are all set up now, but still the real building process of the house has not occurred.
- Beri'ah ("World of Creation"):
  At this stage the real-estate agent will take everything the man told him about what kind of house he wants. He will take these words and translate them into things that can exist in a home. For instance, if the person said he wants a home where he can swim, the real-estate agent might translate that into him having a pool, or having a beach-home. This translations process is called the masach (screen) which carries across all the upper desires and connects them to things in the real world. Real estate agent must pull out from those words what this guy really wants and how to find a house that will accomplish his goal. To translate what this guy wants to get out of a house and make it into a picture of an actual house. What he creates is the world of Beriyah. He must figure out all the different scenarios that would have all the elements with the best combination=Beriya. The real-estate broker need not do this, this technically could also be done within the person's self.
- Yetzirah ("World of Formation"):
  Now someone must figure out exact dimensions for each of these things, its shape, what it will be constructed out of. Will it be made of brick, limestone, wood or something else. Someone must look at the person's style, needs and desires. For instance if they intend to have parties, they should probably have a hardwood floor instead of carpet. Someone at this stage figures out the exact shape, size of the house and its location and then creates a floorplan.
- Asiyah Ruchnit ("Spiritual World of Action"):
  Now this plan must go to the builders. The builders must look at the blueprint and figure out how to actually build a house like this. Sometimes a certain type of house can be drawn up in Yetzira but in real life wouldn't hold up or would be impracticable. These builders must figure out how to pour the cement, how to make it strong, and figure out where they will get the furniture/materials to actually make something like that. They must study the blueprint and figure out how to make something that will work.
- Asiyah Gashmit ("Physical World of Action"):
  The builders actually pour the cement or whatever and build the physical structure and everything in the house. Now the man can go live in the house and enjoy and express himself in fulfillment of his original desire which started this entire process in the Infinite Light before the Contraction.

=== Only Analogies ===
While the Hasidic texts offer many analogies of how Seder Hishtalshelus exists within a person, such as the one given above, they also emphasize that these are only analogies and the analogue is nothing like the analogies. These analogies are meant only to give a glimpse into Seder Hishtalshelus in a way that we are familiar with, but the true analogue deals with how God interrelates with our world. Much like a house, God desires a "dwelling place" in this world. This means He desired that his Essence be revealed through the medium of this world much like a person might wish his own essence to be revealed through the medium of his house. While analogies are a necessary step, the true goal of studying Seder Hishlshelus must be to pick out the point that unites all of the analogies and apply it to the analogue i.e. how God is being revealed in our world directly.

On the other hand, the analogies are not vague, These analogies are precise and exact, much scholarly work has been dedicated to understanding and analyzing why particular analogies have been used, some that are not, and some that are inconsistent in application (i.e. a text may use different analogies to demonstrate the same point - the analysis required is to understand and examine the deficiency in each analogy, and how they can be reconciled with each other)

== Relation to Western philosophy ==
Study and contemplation of Seder Hishtalshelus is central to the Intellectual-Hasidism school of Chabad. Some speculate that the recent Hasidic explanations of Seder Hishtalshelus may have been influenced by certain principles in Western philosophy. Various dichotomies mentioned in philosophy are strikingly similar to those mentioned in late Hasidic texts: Form/Matter, Sense/Feeling, Initial Cognition/Semiotic Cognition/Semiotic Transition. Furthermore, the prose of the Rebbe Rashab is almost identical to that of G. W. F. Hegel.

Others counter that the dichotomies mentioned in Hasidic texts originate in sources predating Western philosophy. Proponents of Hasidic philosophy, counter that since Intellectual-Hasidut is an essential wisdom that is higher than, and includes all other wisdoms it would necessarily make reference to all other forms of wisdom, whether Western or otherwise. They would argue that such similarities are not proof of influence of Western philosophy, but rather are evidence that Hasidic philosophy touches upon, unites, and enlightens every other wisdom, whether it be Torah or secular.

The website and books of Sanford Drob bring the Seder Hishtalshelut theosophical scheme of Lurianic Kabbalah into dialogue with Modern and Postmodern Philosophy and Psychology. In our age when Western philosophy deconstructs the possibility of metaphysics, he sees the Lurianic scheme as an essence-myth that transcends and incorporates secular disciplines, allowing it to re-open the possibilities of philosophy. This process both enriches the secular disciplines, while giving intellectual insights into the Lurianic myth through revealing its facets in human life. This dialogue includes Hegelian dialectics and its application in Marxism, Freud, Jung and Deconstructionism, as well as ancient systems of thought.

== See also ==
- Anthropomorphism in Kabbalah
- Jewish meditation
- Mandaean cosmology
- Merkabah
