= Gilgul =

Reincarnation in Kabbalah

Gilgul (also Gilgul neshamot or Gilgulei HaNeshamot; Heb. גלגול הנשמות, Plural: גלגולים Gilgulim) is a concept of reincarnation or "transmigration of souls" in Kabbalistic esoteric mysticism. In Hebrew, the word gilgul means "cycle" or "wheel" and neshamot is the plural for "souls." Souls are seen to cycle through lives or incarnations, being attached to different human bodies over time. Which body they associate with depends on their particular task in the physical world, spiritual levels of the bodies of predecessors and so on. The concept relates to the wider processes of history in Kabbalah, involving cosmic Tikkun (Messianic rectification), and the historical dynamic of ascending Lights and descending Vessels from generation to generation.

The esoteric explanations of gilgul were articulated in Jewish mysticism by Isaac Luria in the 16th century, as part of the metaphysical purpose of Creation.

== History in Jewish thought ==
Reincarnation is an esoteric belief within many streams of modern Judaism but is not an essential tenet of traditional Judaism. It is not mentioned in classical sources such as the Hebrew Bible, the classical rabbinic works (Mishnah and Talmud), or Maimonides' 13 principles of faith. Kabbalah, however, teaches a belief in gilgul; hence, the belief is universal in Hasidic Judaism, which regards the Kabbalah as sacred and authoritative.

Among well-known rabbis who rejected the idea of reincarnation are Saadia Gaon, David Kimhi, Hasdai Crescas, Jedaiah ben Abraham Bedersi (early 14th century), Joseph Albo, Abraham ibn Daud, and Leon of Modena. Among the Geonim, Hai ben Sherira argued with Saadia Gaon in favour of gilgulim.

Rabbis who believed in the idea of reincarnation include, from Medieval times, the mystical leaders Nahmanides and Bahya ben Asher; from the 16th-century Levi ibn Habib, and from the mystical school of Safed, Solomon Alkabetz, Isaac Luria, and his exponent Hayyim ben Joseph Vital; and from the 18th-century: the founder of Hasidic Judaism, the Baal Shem Tov, later Hasidic Masters, and the Lithuanian Jewish Orthodox leader and Kabbalist the Vilna Gaon; and - amongst others - from the 19th/20th-century: Yosef Hayyim, author of the Ben Ish Hai.

I have written down the dream letter for letter, word for word, as found in [my father’s] handwriting in his prayerbook: a recollection that in Jerusalem, the holy city, in the year 5500, I dreamt in the month of Av or Elul – I do not remember exactly which – one night that I and another person would be killed as martyrs to God. Later that very year, on the eve of the Sabbath Niẓavim-Vayelekh, they told me in a dream that the soul of my son Moshe Ḥayyim is the soul of a Tanna…. I asked him who I was. I was of a mind to ask whether I was Simon or Yoḥai. I was too embarrassed to allow the question to cross my lips. Before I could ask it, they told me, “You are Judah b. Bava.”

— Immanuel Hai Ricchi

The 16th century mystical renaissance in communal Safed marked an important development in Kabbalistic thought, with a significant impact on mystical circles and Jewish spirituality. It was also the time when Kabbalah was most widely disseminated. In this context, Isaac Luria taught new explanations of the process of gilgul and identification of the reincarnations of historic Jewish figures, which Hayyim ben Joseph Vital compiled in his Shaar HaGilgulim.

Shaar haGilgulim lists possible reincarnations: "One who has sexual relations with an animal is reincarnated as a bat, one who has relations with a menstruant non-Jewish woman, one who commits adultery is reincarnated as a donkey, with his mother as a she-ass, with a man as a rabbit or hare". Tzaddikim can reincarnate as a fish, because "fish do not have to be ritually slaughtered before being rectified via eating". David Roskies in The Shtetl Book mentions the following beliefs: "The soul of a tsadek becomes the soul of a fish. The soul of a butcher who eats treyf meat becomes the soul of a black crow. The soul of a dishonest khazn becomes the soul of a dog. Because his prayer was as pleasing to the Lord as a dog’s bark. The soul of an informer becomes that of parrot. Because he acted like a parrot: spoke the wrong things at the wrong time to the wrong people." According to Shaar haGilgulim, a soul can even reincarnate in an inanimate object like a stone.

Historian Nathaniel Deutsch mentioned a widely reported anecdote as a modern example of the gilgul belief. In 2003, two fish cutters claimed to have encountered a talking carp at the New Square Fish Market in Rockland County, New York. The incident occurred in a Hasidic community of about 7,000 members. "The story goes that a 20-pound carp about to be slaughtered and made into gefilte fish for Sabbath dinner began speaking in Hebrew, shouting apocalyptic warnings and claiming to be the troubled soul of a revered community elder who recently died."

== See also ==
In Judaism:

- Lurianic Kabbalah
- Ibbur
- Dybbuk
- Shaar HaGilgulim

For comparison with other religions:

- Reincarnation
