= The World of Chaos and The World of Rectification =

Two general stages in Jewish Kabbalah

The World of Chaos (Hebrew: עוֹלָם הַתֹּ֫הוּ, romanized: ʿOlām hatTohu) and The World of Rectification (Hebrew: עוֹלָם הַתִקוּן, romanized: ʿOlām hatTiqqun) are two general stages in Jewish Kabbalah in the order of descending spiritual worlds known as "the Four Worlds". In subsequent creations, they also represent two archetypal spiritual states of being and consciousness. Their concepts derive from the new scheme of Lurianic Kabbalah by Isaac Luria (1534–1572), the father of modern Kabbalah, based on his interpretation of classic references in the Zohar.

The implications of tohu and tiqqun underlie the origin of free will and the evil realm of the qlippoth caused by the "Shattering of the Vessels" (Hebrew: שְבִירַת הַכֵּלִים, romanized: Šəḇīraṯ hakkēlīm), the processes of spiritual and physical exile and redemption, the meaning of the 613 commandments, and the messianic rectification of existence.

Tikkun also means the esoteric sifting or clarification (בירור) of concealed divine sparks (ניצוצות) exiled in physical creation. This new paradigm in Kabbalah replaced the previous linear description of descent by Moses ben Jacob Cordovero with a dynamic process of spiritual enclothement, where higher souls invest inwardly in lower "vessels".

The cosmic drama of tiqqun in Lurianic Kabbalah inspired the 16th-18th century popular Jewish imagination, explaining contemporary oppression and supporting messiah claimants. The essential tiqqun is to have peace and order in Creation. The revivalist Hasidic Judaism from the 18th century onwards, internalised esoteric Lurianism through its concern with experiencing divine omnipresence amidst daily material life.

The terminology of the modern ideal of tikkun olam "repairing the world" is taken from the Lurianic concept but applied more widely to ethical activism and justice in contemporary society.

The individual tiqqun may or may not also include gilgul (reincarnation) theology; this means that, whether or not it is contemplated about tiqqun, the latter must correspond to one or more decisive actions that prevent a previous lack. The difference between Tikkun Olam and individual Tikkun focuses on the qualitative scope and devotional commitment to it for which the rectified object is so elevated or correct, therefore, both in the World and among people. Isaac Luria stated that only subsequently can, for example, previously absent Mitzvot be fulfilled, and this is the thing related to both tiqqunim, which are different in terms of work carried out and the areas to which they refer.

== Overview of Lurianic Kabbalah ==
Jewish diaspora expulsions. The 1492 Expulsion from Spain, motivated the messianic-national orientation of the Rabbinic scholars and mystics in 16th century Safed. Lurianism systemised this in its new Kabbalistic redemption scheme

Isaac Luria reinterpreted the whole scheme of Kabbalah in the 16th century, essentially making the second of two different versions of theoretical Kabbalah: the Medieval/Classic/Zoharic (later systemised by Moses ben Jacob Cordovero directly before Isaac Luria in Safed), and Lurianic Kabbalah. However, he understood his new doctrinal revelation as no more than the true meaning and deeper systemisation of the Zohar. Lurianic Kabbalah became the dominant system in Jewish mysticism, displacing Cordovero's, and afterwards, the Zohar was read by Jewish Kabbalists in its light.

Medieval Kabbalah depicts a linear descending hierarchy of Ohr "Light", the ten sefirot or divine attributes emerging from concealment in the Ein Sof "Divine Infinity" to enact Creation, with the Four Worlds unfolding sequentially until physical creation. Lurianic Kabbalah, in contrast, describes dynamic processes of exile and redemption in the flow of Ohr, where higher levels descend into lower states, as souls to spiritual bodies. This process introduces or interprets new Kabbalistic doctrines and concepts.

In the Lurianic scheme, Creation is initiated by a primordial and radical divine tzimtzum "self-withdrawal", forming a symbolic space in which only an imprint remains of the withdrawn Ein Sof. After this, a thin, diminished new emanation, able to create finitude, extends from the withdrawn infinite light into the vacuum. This represents the latently finite potentials in the Ein Sof.

The new emanation is the fountainhead for all subsequent creation but instead leads to a catastrophe in the emerging spiritual Worlds. Because the sefirot are pure and unrelated to each other at this stage, each attribute alone is unable to contain the enormity of the divine light as it descends into them, and the vessels of the sefirot shatter, creating the World of Tohu. Their divine light is released and reascends while the broken vessel fragments descend, still animated by sparks of Ohr. The fragments become the absorbed, animating source of the subsequent Four Worlds in stable Creation (called the realms of Tikkun "rectification"). As the fragments are animated by exiled divine sparks, a consciousness unaware of its divine dependence, the resulting Creation can exist independently rather than being nullified by its source. This process, however, overspills into the realms of evil (qlippoth "shells"). Tiqqun is supremely embodied in the highest of the Four Worlds, the perfected world of Atziluth "Emanation", through the sefirot reconfiguring as partzufim "personas". Rectification of the independent lower three worlds of Beri'ah "Creation", Yetzirah "Formation", and Assiah "Action" is the task of humanity. Adam Kadmon incorporated the collective souls of humanity before eating from the tree of the knowledge of good and evil, a manifestation in Kabbalah of the sefirot. His sin introduced a new dispersal of Divine vitality into exile in Creation, and shedding soul sparks from his being.

The election of the Israelites through the Law given to Moses at Sinai in the section Mishpatim of the Book of Exodus, recollected the 600,000 root souls from Adam. The 613 commandments redeem the exiled sparks of holiness from Tohu, embedded below in physical creation. The messianic era for all peoples is inaugurated when the collective souls of Israel complete the esoteric cosmic Tikkun. National and individual spiritual failures in Jewish history delay redemption by introducing further exile of Divine vitality to the realms of impurity. Each root soul is subdivided into soul sparks that reincarnate (gilgul) to complete cosmic and personal tiqqun, as in Lurianism, higher levels return dynamically in lower vessels. The messianic redemption combines the advantages of the lights of tohu in mature rectified vessels of tiqqun and the unity of God and Creation.

== The supernal worlds of tohu and Tiqqun ==
=== Origin of Igul-Circle and Yashar-Line ===
Figurative origin of Igul-Circle (potential, feminine) and Yashar-Line (manifest, masculine) in creation of the spiritual Worlds

Moses ben Jacob Cordovero, in his comprehensive systemization of Medieval Kabbalah, had reconciled previous Kabbalists' opinions of the sephirot by describing each as Divine ohr ("light") invested in ten spiritual keilim "vessels." This overcame the philosophical difficulty of Divine attributes, as in the Infinite Ein Sof before Creation, the sephirot were entirely nullified into non-existence in the simple unity of endless Divinity. They emerge as Divine attributes only from the perspective of creation by combining two aspects of lights and vessels. The spiritual vitality, denoted as "light", similarly manifests in two levels of Ohr Sovev (transcendent) and Ohr Mimalei (immanent). First the light creates the vessels, then animates (fills) them. Only the vessels differ in their natures, while the light remains unified.

Isaac Luria accepted this but adapted it to his new scheme. As the Kav "ray" of illumination shines into the ḥalal or primordial "vacuum"), beginning Creation, it first forms the pristine realm of Adam Kadmon ("Primordial Man"), described in previous Kabbalah, the first of the comprehensive Four or Five Worlds. Adam Kadmon is the realm of Keter ("crown"), supra-conscious Divine Will. Due to its supreme transcendence, it is often excluded from listing with the other Four Worlds. Medieval Kabbalists listed Keter as the first Sephirah, but debated its relationship with the Ein Sof or Limitless Divine. Luria described Keter as an intermediary to the sephirot, not identified with the Ein Sof, but transcending the sephirot. He excludes it from their usual listing, substituting Da'at "Knowledge" instead. If the sephirot are listed with their vessels, Chokmah ("wisdom") becomes the first principle. Adam Kadmon is all light with no vessels before the emergence of the sephirot; its expanse within the ḥalal is limited by the power of the Reshima ("impression" left in the empty vacuum) and by its future potential to create vessels. Adam Kadmon is the divine will of Keter and the "plan" of the latent Chokmah within Keter for all subsequent detailed creation in potential. Its anthropomorphic name figuratively denotes that man is both the purpose of creation below and the embodiment on high of the sephirot Divine attributes, not yet manifest.

The sephirot manifest in two general metaphorical-figurative schemes, as igulim (concentric "circles" within the "circular" ḥalal) and Yosher/Yashar (the three-column "upright" diagram, related to the "line" beamed into the ḥalal). Igul denotes potential creation encompassed within the female principle. Yashar denotes manifest creation, the male principle, where creation proceeds as a hierarchical progression. As Igulim, ten concentric "circles," the sephirot act sequentially and independently from each other, from Keter in closest proximity to the Ein Sof, to Malkhut at the centre. As Yosher, an "upright" 3-column linear scheme, the sephirot act as a harmonized configuration of related powers in the scheme of man. As in the soul of man and represented in his bodily form, each sephirah fulfils its particular function while correlating and sharing with the other powers as a whole arrangement. As Adam Kadmon is before the emergence of the sephirot, it relates to both schemes only in latent ("transcendent") potential. As the Kav shines into the vacuum, it first emanates the ten sequential Igulim, then is "enclothed" by the Yosher scheme as Adam Kadmon.

=== Emergence of the sephirot - Akudim, Nekudim, Berudim ===
From Adam Kadmon emanate five lights. As the Yosher scheme relates to the figure of man, and Adam Kadmon embodies Keter (Will-"crown") and its latent Chokmah (intellectual plan-"wisdom"), so these five lights figuratively emanate from the "head" of Adam Kadmon: from the "eyes, ears, nose, mouth and forehead". These interact with each other to form three specific olamot (worlds) after Adam Kadmon, three evolving stages in the first manifestation of the sephirot systemised by Luria:

- Akudim (world of "Binding/Ringed") 10 lights in one vessel - stable tohu Chaos
- Nekudim (world of "Points/Spotted") 10 isolated lights in 10 vessels - unstable tohu Chaos (Olam HaTohu-the "World of Chaos")
- Berudim (world of "Connection/Flecked") 10 inter-relating lights in 10 vessels - beginning of tiqqun ("Rectification")

The terms are learned from the esoteric meaning of the story of Jacob's breeding of Laban's flocks in Genesis 30:27-43, where the terms Akudim, Nekudim and Teluim (Patched") are used. Akudim is yuli ("potential" creation), Nekudim is the sephirot acting as independent Iggulim (concentric "circles") absolute principles, Berudim is the sephirot acting as a harmonised Yosher ("upright" three-column configuration) where all principles work together: each sephirah is able to inter-relate with the other 9, by each latently incorporating each of the other principles. For example, Chesed (Kindness) and Gevurah (Severity) no longer oppose as absolute principles, but there is Kindness within Severity and Severity within Kindness. In the same way, all 10 sephirot subdivide into 10 x 10 = 100 latent principles, allowing the sephirot to harmonise as one system (as Yosher-Man).

The potency of Lurianic scheme, with its new doctrines and paradigm, arises from its power to systemise and unify previously unexplained and unrelated Kabbalistic notions. In this case, previously Iggulim and Yosher were alternative and complementary descriptions of the sephirot in Medieval Kabbalah. In Lurianic Kabbalah their difference becomes the root cause of the new process of dynamic crisis-catharsis in the Divine unfolding of Creation. Akudim is the initial stable stage of Olam HaTohu (the "World of Chaos"), the first emergence of the sephirot in undifferentiated unity, 10 lights encompassed in one vessel. In this supreme abundance of Divinity, there is no distinction between each sephirah, all Creation being included in potential. Luria read this as Genesis 1:1 "In the beginning God created the Heavens and the Earth", the initial vital source from which all would unfold. Nekudim is the secondary unstable form of chaos, referred to in general by "Olam HaTohu" (the "World of Chaos"), which precipitates the catastrophe of Shevirat HaKeilim ("shattering" of the sephirot "vessels"). Berudim is the initial incomplete stage of Olam Hatiqqun (the "World of Rectification"), beginning rectification of the sephirot, as it is reconstituted enough to exist stabily. However, supernal rectification is only completed subsequently in Atzilut (the world of "Emanation"), first of the comprehensive Four spiritual Worlds after the Shevirah, through the secondary transformation of the sephirot into personas. Atzilut, therefore, is generally referred to by "Olam Hatiqqun" (the "World of Rectification"). All three stages Akudim, Nekudim, Berudim are also described sometimes as three initial stages in the emergence of the World of Atzilut. However, in general, unqualified reference to "Atzilut" denotes its complete recified form after Berudim, the first of the comprehensive Four Worlds.

=== The world of tohu and the shattering ===
In Kabbalah, the sephirot comprise the inner "life of God;" their unification is humanity's task. When the sephiroth unite above in Atziluth, the Shekhinah unites with God below and blessings are channelled into physical creation. The "Patach Eliyahu" section of the Zohar relates that the sephirot only exist from the perspective of Creation. From the Divine perspective, only unity exists. The sephiroth are the channels through which creation is enacted. They become the revealed personas manifested from concealment and nullification in the Ein Sof.

As the Lurianic scheme continues, in Nekudim, the world of "Points", the sephiroth exist in separation and differentiation from each other: ten distinct point principles through ten vessels without harmony. This state, Olam haTohu was read by Luria in Genesis 1:2 "And the earth was tohu wa-bohu (Chaos and Void), with darkness over the surface of the deep.", like discreet, sequential concentric circles. They become a domain of pluralism rather than of unity. The world of chaos has very high level of light but weak vessels. Vessels paradoxically allow the revelation of Divinity to Creation by restricting and containing the Divine abundance in stable limitations. In tohu, the lack of sharing between the vessels makes them immature, undeveloped and weak, while the divine illumination overflows their capacity to contain. This causes the cosmic catastrophe of Shevirat HaKeilim "Shattering of the Vessels," introducing disharmony and exile throughout divinity.

The light created each sephirah sequentially, first vessel, then the illumination within. Each sephira's light also contained the subsequent diminishing lights to form the following lower sephirot. As the light of the Ein Sof radiated to form Keter, the vessel of Keter could absorb the life force. In turn, the vessels of Hokhma and Bina could absorb most of their flow, as their proximity to Keter made them strong enough. Keter extended enough relationship to them as their motivating Will. Their excesses of light encompassed each as an or makif "surrounding light." However, as the light proceeded to Da'at, the root of the emotional sephiroth, its vessel could not absorb the abundant radiance for the totality of the emotions and shattered. This caused the total light to proceed downwards, shattering each vessel. The succession was altered in Yesod, the channel of connection to Malkhuth. Initially, it received only the light for Malkhuth, which it projected on. It then also shattered under its light. However, this enabled Malchut to partially absorb its light before collapsing; the lower external aspects of Malkhuth were strengthened, so the collapse in Malchut was only partial.

=== Nitzutzot-Sparks of Holiness and the purpose of Shevirah ===
This doctrine is the Lurianic esoteric meaning of Genesis 36:31 and I Chronicles 1:43: "These are the kings who reigned in the land of Edom before there reigned any king over the children of Israel." Edom is described in Genesis as the descendants of Esau. In the Kabbalistic scheme, the Patriarchs Abraham, Isaac and Jacob embody respectively Chesed, Gevurah and Tiferet. Chesed and Gevurah are imbalanced, while Tiferet is harmony between the two. Consequently, while Jacob fathered the 12 tribes of Israel, Abraham gave birth to Ishmael, and Isaac gave birth to Esau. Esau and Ishmael are the two spiritual roots for the Nations of the world. They are identified with unrectified Chesed and unrectified Gevurah respectively, Kindness and Severity of the world of tohu. In the Kabbalistic scheme, they are rectified in the universal Messianic era when all peoples will "go up to the mountain of the Lord" to follow the 7 Laws of Noah. The eight kings listed who reigned in Edom before any king of Israel embodied the eight sephirot of Da'at to Malkhuth in the world of Chaos: the shattered vessels. Of each, it says they lived and died, death connoting the soul-light of the sephirot ascending back to its source while the body-vessel descends-shatters. Attached to the broken vessels are residues of the light, Nitzutzot-"Sparks" of holiness, as all Creation only continues to exist from non-existence by the Divine flow of Will. The sparks are the creative force of the Sephirot down the Four Worlds, giving life to the broken vessels, that become the descending beings of each realm. As they descend, they subdivide innumerable times. The fragments contain only sparks of holiness, allowing them to become self-aware creations rather than being nullified in Divine light. The unabsorbed residue of the broken vessels in our physical, lowest World Assiah becomes the realm of impurity and evil. To Kabbalah, as Creation is enacted through Divine "speech" as in Genesis 1, so gematria (numerical value of Hebrew letters) has spiritual meaning. In the supernal World of Atziluth-Emanation, the origin of our spiritual Order of Worlds, the sparks of holiness are said to subdivide into 288 general-root sparks, read out from the rest of Genesis 1:2, "And the Spirit of God hovered over the waters." Merachepet-"hovered" splits into the number "288 died", the divided Divine sparks within the broken fragments.

=== The World of tiqqun and Partzufim-Personas ===
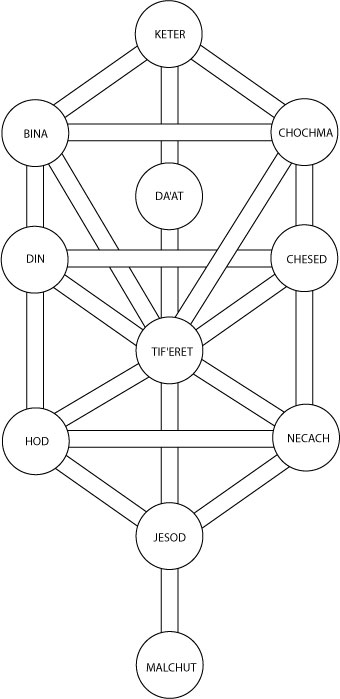
The sephirot in the scheme of Yosher-Upright, from which the partzufim develop

The comprehensive Four Worlds of our created existence are together collectively the realms of tiqqun ("Fixing"). Atzilut, the highest, is called specifically Olam Hatiqqun (the "World of Rectification"). In Atzilut, the Sephirot evolve into new persona arrangements, where they can unite. The different realms of tiqqun are characterised in comparison to Tohu as lower lights and stronger vessels. After the inter-inclusion of the ten sephirot within each other, in Lurianic Kabbalah, they then develop into personas. Wide discussion of the personas is found in the Medieval Kabbalah of the Zohar, before Isaac Luria. In the Zohar, Shimon bar Yochai expounds upon the spiritual roles of the personas by talking about them as independent spiritual manifestations. "The Holy Ancient of Days" or "The Long Visage," two of the different personas, are not just alternative adjectives for God but are particular spiritual manifestations, levels and natures. Lurianic Kabbalah focused on the role of the personas as the fully evolved stage of the primordial evolution of the sephirot at the beginning of Creation. Instead of each of the ten Sephirot merely including a full subset of ten sephirot as latent potential forces, the first stage of their evolution, in the personas the sephirot become fully autonomous and interrelated. The name of each persona denotes that the sephira from which it derived has now become an independent scheme of 10 fully functioning Sephirot in the "Upright" (Yosher) form of "Man". This reconfiguration is essential in Lurianic Kabbalah to enable the opposing spiritual forces of the Sephirot to work together in harmony. Each persona now operates independently, and unites with the other ones. So, for example, "The Long Visage" is said to descend and become enclothed within the lower personas. The sephirot now harmonise to enable the Lurianic scheme of tiqqun to begin. Supernal tiqqun is completed in Atzilut through the sephirot evolving into the further stage of personas. In the personas, rather than each sephira partially inter-relating by latently incorporating the other powers, as in Berudim, instead, all harmonize fully around one of their numbers as complete autonomous Yosher schemes. The persona then interact and enclothe within each other through anthropomorphic relationships in Atzilut, channeling Divine vitality to lower worlds.

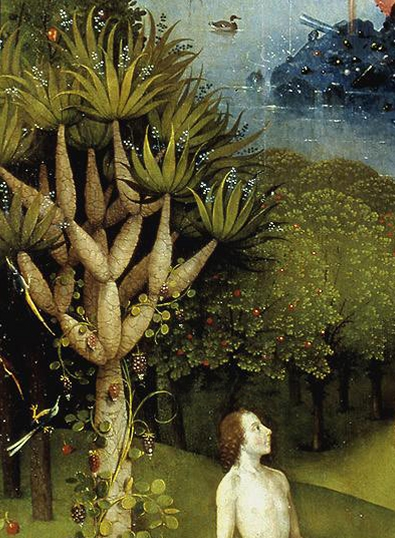
Lurianism sees two kinds of Nitzutzot-Sparks: Adam included all souls. His sin materialised creation and shed soul sparks

== Photo gallery ==
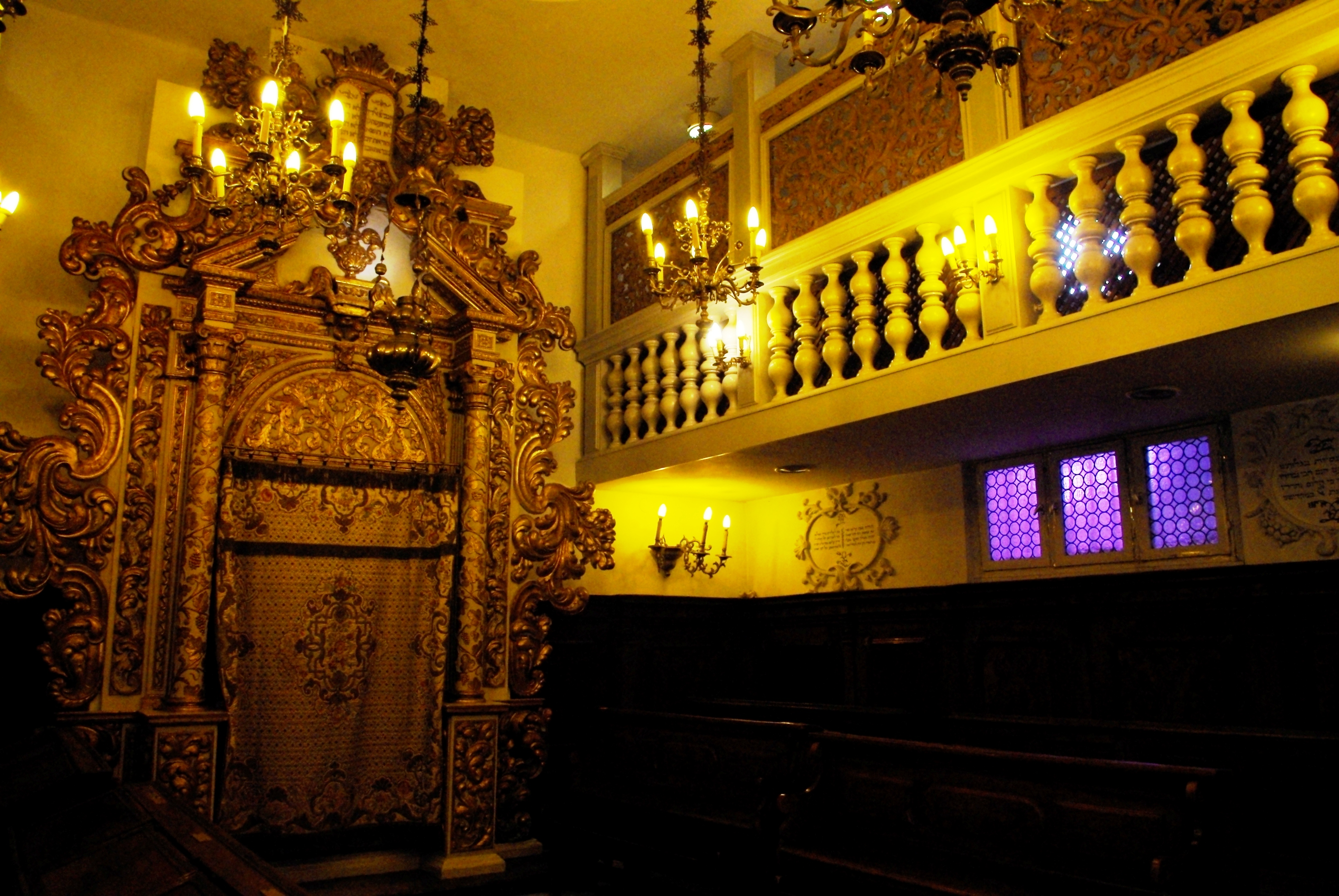
"Every descent is for a higher ascent": sin causes new Shevirah. Providential redemption transforms darkness to light, uniting tohu and tiqqun

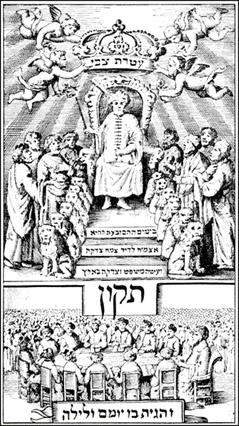
The tiqqun completed by Sabbatai Zevi, printed Amsterdam, 1666. After Zevi's conversion to Islam, the Sabbatean mystical heresy soon inverted Lurianism through the "holy sin"

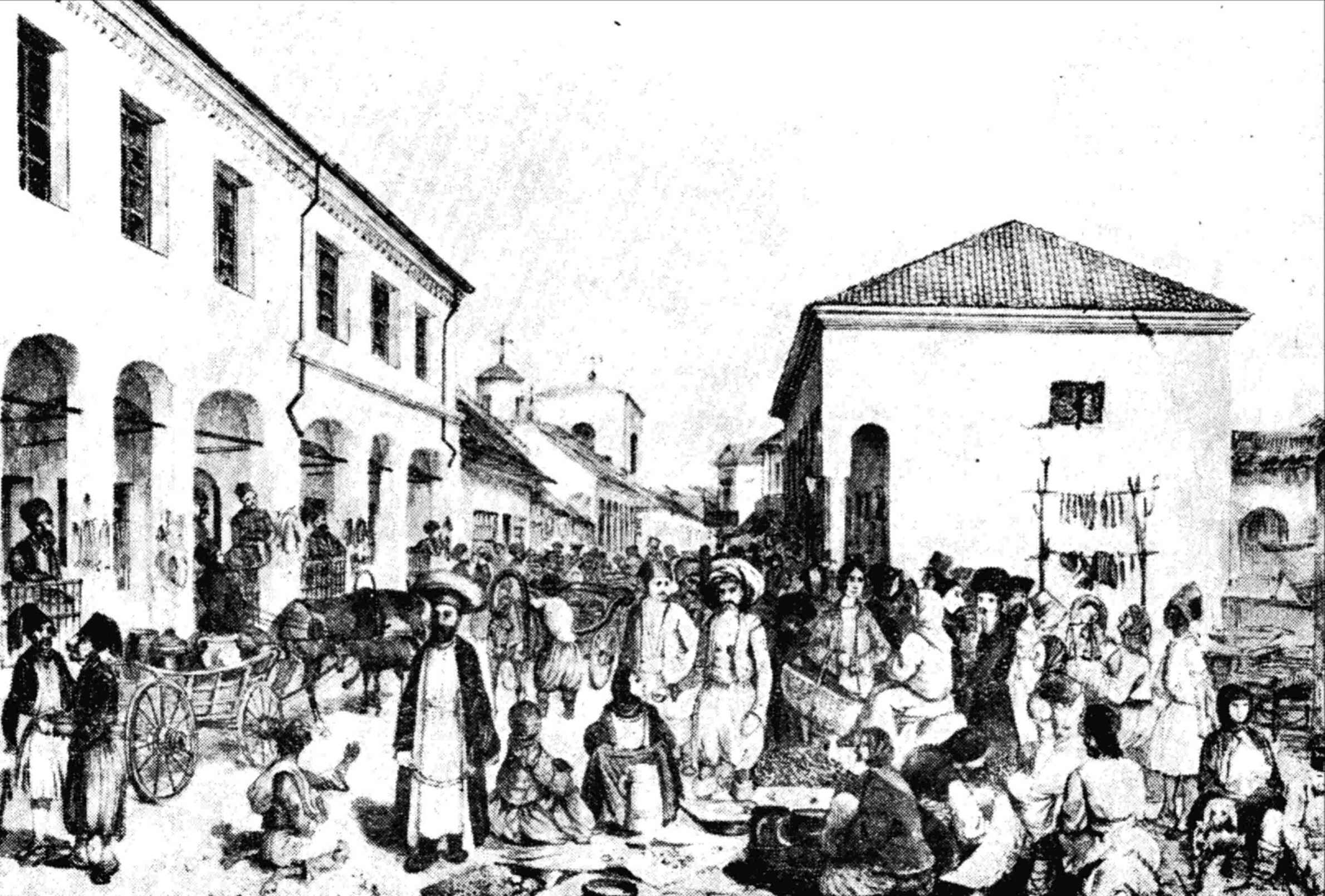
Hasidic trader in Iași fair, Romania, 1845. Hasidic thought emphasised the material involvement of Lurianic messianic mysticism

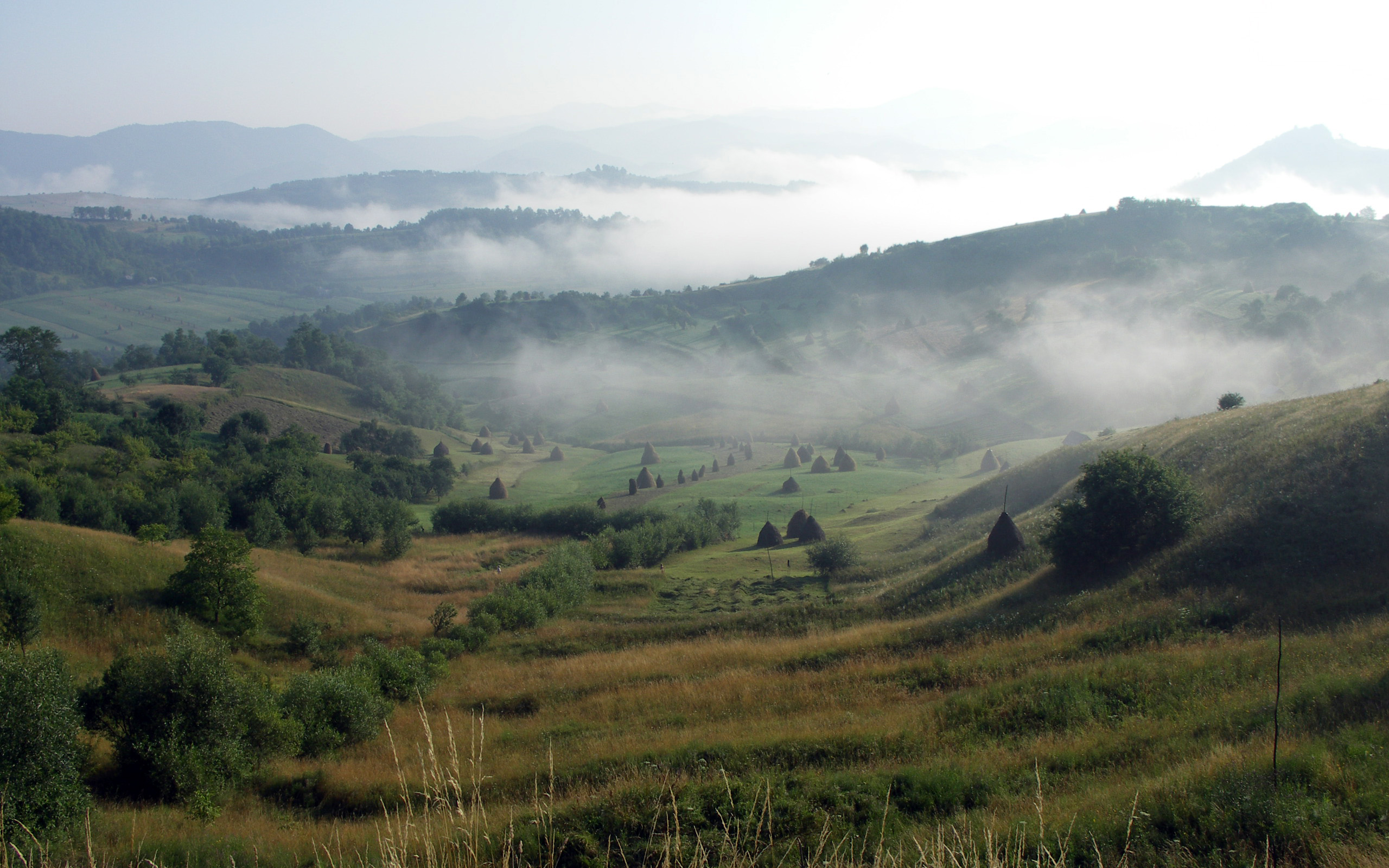
Hasidic stories and thought emphasise personal travels to redeem Nitzutzot sparks, linking each individual with their providential soul tasks

== See also ==
- Jewish diaspora
- Sefirot
- Tohu wa-bohu
- Yeridat ha-dorot#Generational ascent in Kabbalah
