= Anthropomorphism in Kabbalah =

Kabbalah, the central system in Jewish mysticism, uses anthropomorphic mythic symbols to metaphorically describe manifestations of God in Judaism. Based on the verses "God created man in his own image, in the image of God created he him; male and female created he them" (Genesis 1:27) and "from my flesh shall I see God" (Job 19:26), Kabbalah uses the form of the human body to describe the structure of the human soul, and the nature of supernal Divine emanations. A particular concern of Kabbalah is sexual unity between male and female potencies in Divinity on high, depicted as interaction of the two sides in the sephiroth, Adam Kadmon the divine Anthropos, between archetypal partzufim or divine personas, and the redemption of the exiled Shekhinah, feminine divine presence, from captivity among the impure forces called qlippoth "husks" below.

Kabbalists repeatedly warn and stress the need to divest their subtle notions from any corporeality, dualism, plurality, or spatial and temporal connotations. All divine emanations are only from the spiritual perception of creation, nullifying from the Divine view into the Ohr Ein Sof (Infinite light). As "the Torah speaks in the language of Man", according to Berachot 31b and other sources, the empirical terms are necessarily imposed upon man's experience in this world. Once the analogy is described, its dialectical limitations are then related to stripping the kernel of its qlippa "husk" to arrive at a more accurate conception. Nonetheless, Kabbalists believe their mythic symbols are not arbitrary but carefully chosen terminologies that mystically point beyond their limits of language to denote subtle connotations and profound relationships in the Divine spiritual influences. More accurately, as they describe the emanation of the Material world from the Four Worlds, the analogous anthropomorphisms and material metaphors themselves derive through cause and effect from their precise root analogies on High.

Due to the danger of idolatrous material analogy, Kabbalists historically restricted esoteric oral transmission to close circles, with pure motives, advanced learning and elite preparation. At various times in history, however, they sought wide public dissemination for Kabbalistic mysticism or popular ethical literature based on Kabbalah to further Messianic preparation. Understanding Kabbalah through its unity with mainstream Talmudic, Halakhic, and philosophical proficiency was a traditional prerequisite to avert fallacies. Rabbinic Kabbalists attributed the 17th-18th century Sabbatean antinomian mystical heresies to false corporeal interpretations of Kabbalah through impure motives. Later Hasidic thought saw its devotional popularisation of Kabbalah as a safeguard against esoteric corporeality by its internalization of Jewish mysticism through the psychological spiritual experience of man.

== Background ==
The roots of Kabbalah predate rabbinic Judaism by centuries. Talmudic-era Rabbinic Judaism of the early centuries CE comprised the Halakha or religious law and the imaginative theological and narrative aggadot or narratives. Alongside references to early Rabbinic Jewish mysticism, unsystematised philosophical thought was expressed in the Aggada, as well as highly anthropomorphic narrative depictions accentuating the personal God of the Hebrew Bible in a vivid loving relationship with the Jewish people in Rabbinic Judaism. Among such visual metaphors in the Talmud and Midrash, God is said to wear tefillin, embody the lover seeking for Israel's bride in the Song of Songs, suffer with Israel's suffering, accompany them in exile as the Shekhina or female divine presence, appear as a warrior at the crossing the Red Sea and a wise elder at the revelation at Sinai. Jacob Neusner shows the chronologically developing anthropomorphism in classic Rabbinic literature, culminating in the personal, poetically embodied, relational, familiar "God we know and love" in the Babylonian Talmud. Gershom Scholem describes the Aggadah as "Giving original expression to the deepest motive-powers of the religious Jew, a quality which helps to make it an excellent and genuine approach to the essentials of Judaism"

The Middle Ages saw the development of systematic theology in Judaism in Jewish philosophy and Kabbalah, both reinterpreting classic rabbinic aggadot according to their differing views of metaphysics. Kabbalah emerged in the 12th-14th centuries parallel to, and soon after, the rationalist tradition in medieval Jewish philosophy. Maimonides articulated normative theology in his philosophical stress against any idolatrous corporeal interpretation of references to God in the Hebrew Bible and Rabbinic literature, encapsulated in his third principle of faith: "I believe with perfect faith that the Creator, Blessed be His Name, has no body, and that He is free from all the properties of matter, and that there can be no (physical) comparison to Him whatsoever," and legal codification of monotheism. He formulated the philosophical transcendence of God through negative theology, allegorising all anthropomorphic references as metaphors of action, and polemicising against literal interpretation of imaginative myth. Kabbalists accepted the Hidden Godhead, reinterpreting it in mystical experience and speculation as the transcendent Ayin "Nothing". However, seeking the personal living God of the Hebrew Bible and classic rabbinic aggadic imagination, they formulated an opposite approach, articulating an inner dynamic life among divine immanent emanations in the Four Worlds. These involved medieval Zoharic notions of divine personas and male-female powers, recast in the 16th century Lurianic Kabbalah as cosmic withdrawal, exile–redemption and Divine personas. Lurianic Kabbalah further emphasised the need to divest its heightened personification from corporeality, while lending its messianic mysticism to popular social appeal which became dominant in early-modern Judaism.

== See also ==
- Devekut
- Dor Daim
- Four who entered the Pardes
- Generational ascent in Kabbalah
- Godhead in Judaism
- Merkabah mysticism
- Song of Songs

== General references ==
- Mystical Concepts in Chassidism: An Introduction to Kabbalistic Concepts and Doctrines, Jacob Immanuel Schochet, Kehot 1998. Also printed at back of bilingual English Tanya. Chapter 1: Anthropomorphism and metaphors
