= Adam Kadmon =

Mystical concept of a heavenly man or world

In Kabbalah, Adam Kadmon (אָדָם קַדְמוֹן, ʾāḏām qaḏmōn, “Primordial Man”) also called Adam Elyon (אָדָם עֶלִיוֹן, ʾāḏām ʿelyōn, “Most High Man”), or Adam Ila’ah (אָדָם עִילָּאָה, ʾāḏām ʿīllāʾā, “Most High Adam” in Aramaic), sometimes abbreviated as A’K (א”ק, ʾA.Q.), is the first of Four Worlds that came into being after the contraction of God's infinite light. Adam Kadmon is not the same as the physical Adam Ha-Rishon (אָדָם הָרִאשׁוֹן).

In Lurianic Kabbalah, the description of Adam Kadmon is anthropomorphic. Nonetheless, Adam Kadmon is divine light without vessels, i.e., pure potential. In the human psyche, Adam Kadmon corresponds to the yechidah, the collective essence of the soul.

== In Judaism ==
=== Philo ===
The first to use the expression “original man,” or “heavenly man,” was Philo, in whose view this γενικός or οὐράνιος ἄνθρωπος, “as being born in the image of God, has no participation in any corruptible or earthlike essence; whereas the earthly man is made of loose material, called a lump of clay.” The heavenly man, as the perfect image of the ‘’Logos‘’, is neither man nor woman, but an incorporeal intelligence purely an idea; while the earthly man, who was created by God later, is perceptible to the senses and partakes of earthly qualities. Philo is evidently combining philosophy and Midrash, Plato and the rabbis.

Setting out from the duplicate biblical account of Adam, who was formed in the image of God (Genesis 1:27), and of the first man, whose body God formed from the earth (Genesis 2:7), he combines with it the Platonic theory of forms; taking the primordial Adam as the idea, and the created man of flesh and blood as the “image.” That Philo's philosophic views are grounded on the Midrash, and not vice versa, is evident from his seemingly senseless statement that the “heavenly man,” the οὐράνιος ἄνθρωπος (who is merely an idea), is “neither man nor woman.” This doctrine, however, becomes quite intelligible in view of the following ancient Midrash.

=== Midrash ===
The remarkable contradiction between Genesis 1:27 and Genesis 2:7 could not escape the attention of the Pharisees, for whom the Bible was a subject of close study. In explaining the various views concerning Eve's creation, they taught that Adam was created as a man-woman (androgynos), explaining “זָכָ֥ר וּנְקֵבָ֖ה” (Genesis 1:27) as “male and female” instead of “man and woman,” and that the separation of the sexes arose from the subsequent operation upon Adam's body, as related in the Scripture. This explains Philo's statement that the original man was neither man nor woman.

This doctrine concerning the Logos, as also that of man made “in the likeness,” although tinged with true Philonic coloring, is also based on theology of the Pharisees. Genesis Rabbah:

Thou hast formed me behind and before’ (Psalms 139:5) is to be explained ‘before the first and after the last day of Creation.’ For it is said, ‘And the spirit of God moved upon the face of the waters,’ meaning the spirit of the Messiah ["the spirit of Adam" in the parallel passage, Midr. Teh. to cxxxix. 5; both readings are essentially the same], of whom it is said (Isaiah 11:2), ‘And the spirit of the Lord shall rest upon him.’

This contains the kernel of Philo's philosophical doctrine of the creation of the original man. He calls him the idea of the earthly Adam, while with the rabbis the spirit (רוח) of Adam not only existed before the creation of the earthly Adam, but was preexistent to the whole of creation. From the preexisting Adam, or Messiah, to the Logos is merely a step.

=== Kabbalah ===
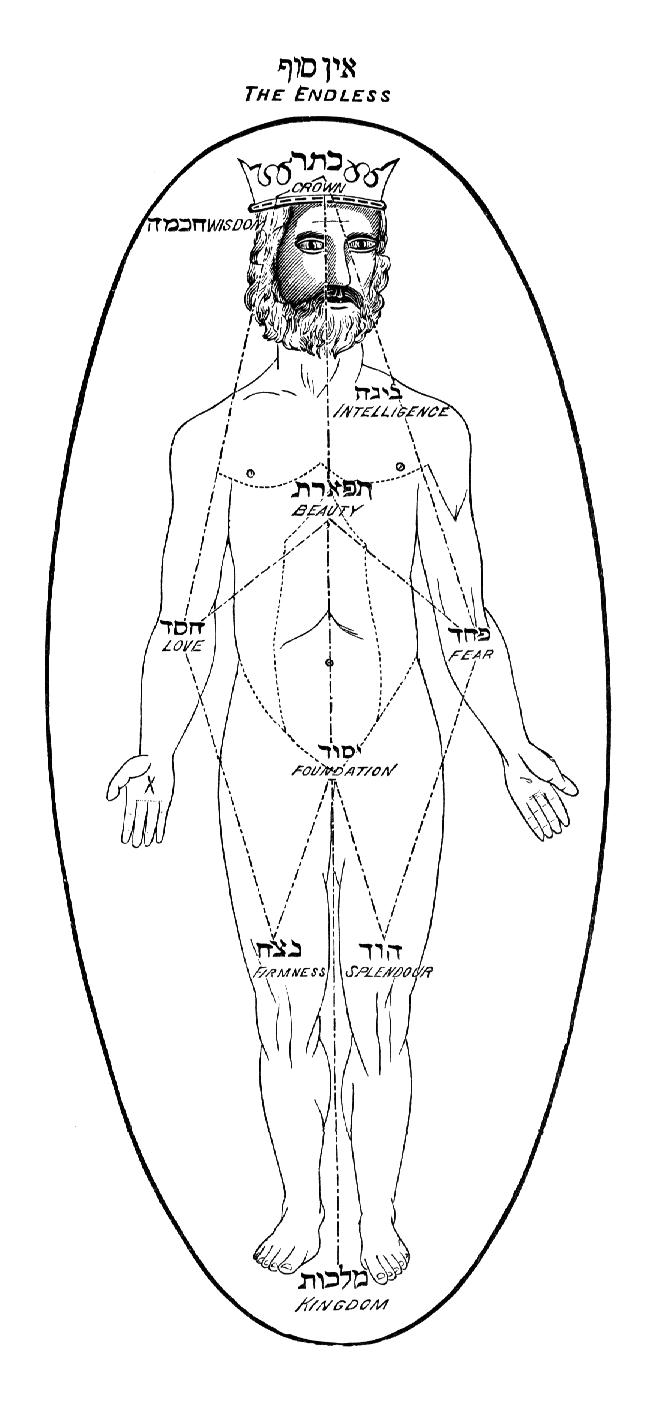
Adam Ḳadmon—Diagram illustrating the Sefirot (Divine Attributes). (From Christian Ginsburg, The Kabbalah - its Doctrines, Development & Literature)

In Kabbalah, before creation began, all that existed was God's Infinite Light. The first stage of creation began when God contracted His Infinite Light to create the vacuum. Then a ray of divine light penetrated the vacuum and the persona of Adam Kadmon was projected into the vacuum. The first stage of Adam Kadmon was in the form of ten concentric circles (igulim), which emanated from the ray. The ray of light was then enclothed by the anthropomorphic form of Adam Kadmon (yosher), which is a realm of infinite divine light without vessels, constrained by its potential to create future Existence. Adam Kadmon is sometimes referred to as ‘’Adam Ila’a’’ (Aramaic: “upper man”) or ‘’Adam Elyon’’ (Hebrew: “upper man”).

The soul of Adam HaRishon (“the first man”) was the supreme essence of mankind. It contained within it all subsequent souls. In the midrash, he is sometimes referred to as ‘’Adam HaKadmoni’’ (“the ancient man”), ‘’Adam Tata’a’’ (Aramaic: “lower man”) or ‘’Adam Tachton’’ (Hebrew: “lower man”).

The anthropomorphic name of Adam Kadmon denotes that it contains both the ultimate divine purpose for creation, i.e., mankind, as well as an embodiment of the Sefirot (divine attributes). Adam Kadmon is paradoxically both “Adam” and divine (“Kadmon-Primary”).

Adam Kadmon preceded the manifestation of the Four Worlds, Atzilut (“emanation”), Beriah (“creation”), Yetzirah (“formation”) and Asiyah (“action”). Whereas each of the Four Worlds is represented by one letter of the divine four-lettered name of God, Adam Kadmon is represented by the transcendental cusp of the first letter Yud.

In the system of the sefirot, Adam Kadmon corresponds to Keter (“crown”), the divine will that motivated creation.

The two versions of Kabbalistic theosophy, the “medieval/classic/Zoharic” (systemised by Moshe Cordovero) and the more comprehensive Lurianic, describe the process of descending worlds differently. For Cordovero, the sefirot, Adam Kadmon and the Four Worlds evolve sequentially from the Ein Sof (divine infinity). For Luria, creation is a dynamic process of divine exile-rectification enclothement, where Adam Kadmon is preceded by the Tzimtzum (Divine “contraction”) and followed by Shevira (the “shattering” of the sefirot).

Closely related to the Philonic doctrine of the heavenly Adam is the Adam Ḳadmon (called also Adam ‘Ilaya, the “high man,” the “heavenly man”) of the Zohar, whose conception of the original man can be deduced from the following passages: “The form of man is the image of everything that is above [in heaven] and below [upon earth]; therefore did the Holy Ancient [God] select it for His own form.”

As with Philo the Logos is the original image of man, or the original man, so in the Zohar the heavenly man is the embodiment of all divine manifestations: the ten Sefirot, the original image of man. The heavenly Adam, stepping forth out of the highest original darkness, created the earthly Adam. In other words, the activity of the original essence manifested itself in the creation of man, who at the same time is the image of the heavenly man and of the universe, just as with Plato and Philo the idea of man, as microcosm, embraces the idea of the universe or macrocosm.

The conception of Adam Ḳadmon becomes an important factor in the later Kabbalah of Isaac Luria. Adam Ḳadmon is with him no longer the concentrated manifestation of the Sefirot, but a mediator between the En-Sof (“infinite”) and the Sefirot. The En-Sof, according to Luria, is so utterly incomprehensible that the older Kabbalistic doctrine of the manifestation of the En-Sof in the Sefirot must be abandoned. Hence he teaches that only the Adam Ḳadmon, who arose in the way of self-limitation by the En-Sof, can be said to manifest himself in the Sefirot. This theory of Luria is treated by Ḥayyim Vital in “’Eẓ Ḥayyim; Derush ‘Agulim we-Yosher” (Treatise on Circles and the Straight Line).

== Gnosticism ==
The Primeval Man (‘’Protanthropos’’, Adam) occupies a prominent place in several Gnostic systems. In the Coptic Nag Hammadi texts, the archetypical Adam is known as Pigeradamas or Geradamas. According to Irenaeus the Aeon Autogenes emits the true and perfect Anthrôpos, also called Adamas; he has a helpmate, “Perfect Knowledge”, and receives an irresistible force, so that all things rest in him. Others say there is a blessed and incorruptible and endless light in the power of Bythos; this is the Father of all things who is invoked as the First Man, who, with his Ennoia, emits “the Son of Man”, or Euteranthrôpos.

According to Valentinus, Adam was created in the name of Anthrôpos and overawes the demons by the fear of the pre-existent man (‘’tou proontos anthropou’’). In the Valentinian syzygies and in the Marcosian system, we meet in the fourth (originally the third) place Anthrôpos and Ecclesia.

In the ‘’Pistis Sophia‘’, the Aeon Jeu is called the First Man, he is the overseer of the Light, messenger of the First Precept, and constitutes the forces of the Heimarmene. In the ‘’Books of Jeu‘’ this “great Man” is the King of the Light-treasure, he is enthroned above all things and is the goal of all souls.

According to the Naassenes, the Protanthropos is the first element; the fundamental being before its differentiation into individuals. “The Son of Man” is the same being after it has been individualized into existing things and thus sunk into matter.

The Gnostic Anthrôpos, therefore, or ‘’Adamas’’, as it is sometimes called, is a cosmogonic element, pure mind as distinct from matter, mind conceived hypostatically as emanating from God and not yet darkened by contact with matter. This mind is considered as the reason of humanity, or humanity itself, as a personified idea, a category without corporeality, the human reason conceived as the World-Soul. The same idea, somewhat modified, occurs in Hermetic literature, especially the ‘’Poimandres‘’.

== In Manichaeism ==
A portion of these Gnostic teachings, when combined with Zoroastrianism, furnished Mani with his particular doctrine of the original man. He even retains the Jewish designations “Adam Kadmon” (= אדם קדמון) and “Nakhash Kadmon” (= נחש קדמון), as may be seen in ‘’Al-Fihrist‘’. But, according to Mani, the original man is fundamentally distinct from the first father of the human race. He is a creation of the King of Light, and is therefore endowed with five elements of the kingdom of light; whereas Adam really owes his existence to the kingdom of darkness, and only escapes belonging altogether to the number of demons through the fact that he bears the likeness of the original man in the elements of light contained within him. The Gnostic doctrine of the identity of Adam, as the original man, with the Messiah appears in Mani in his teaching of the “Redeeming Christ,” who has his abode in the sun and moon, but is identical with the original man. It also appears in this theory that Adam was the first of the sevenfold series of true prophets, comprising Adam, Seth, Noah, Abraham, Zoroaster, Buddha, and Jesus. The stepping-stone from the Gnostic original man to Manichaeism was probably the older Mandaean conception, which may have exercised great influence. Of this conception, however, there remains in the later Mandaean writings little more than the expression “Gabra Ḳadmaya” (Adam Ḳadmon).

== In Mandaeism ==
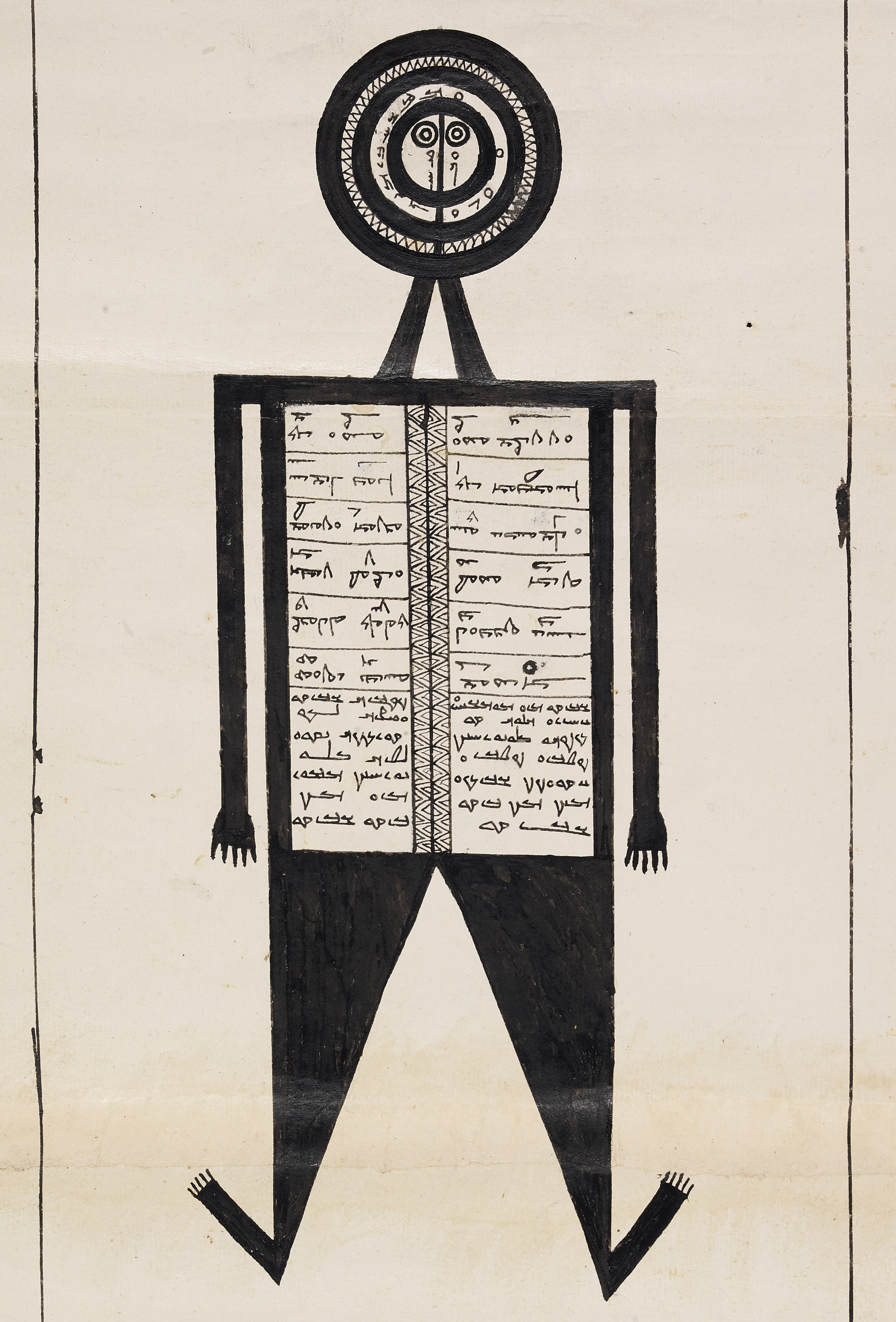
’’Adam Kasia‘’ illustrated in a manuscript of Alma Rišaia Rba

‘’Adam Kasia‘’, also referred to using the portmanteau ‘’Adakas’’ in the ‘’Ginza Rabba‘’, means “the hidden Adam” in Mandaic. The hidden Adam is also called ‘’Adam Qadmaiia’’ (“First Adam”) or ‘’Gabra Qadmaiia ‘’ (“First Man”). In Mandaeism, it means the soul (‘’nišimta‘’) of the first man and the soul of every human. ‘’Adam Kasia’’ shows many similarities with the Jewish idea of Adam Kadmon.

== In other traditions ==
Outside of an Abrahamic context, the Cosmic Man is also an archetypical figure that appears in creation myths of a wide variety of cultures. Generally he is described as bestowing life upon all things, and is also frequently the physical basis of the world, such that after death parts of his body became physical parts of the universe. He also represents the oneness of human existence, or the universe.

For instance, in the Purusha sukta of the Rigveda, Purusha (Sanskrit ‘’puruṣa, ‘’पुरुष “man,” or “Cosmic Man”) is sacrificed by the devas from the foundation of the world—his mind is the Moon, his eyes are the Sun, and his breath is the wind. He is described as having a thousand heads and a thousand feet.

== In popular culture ==
One tradition associates Adam Kadmon or the biblical Adam and the figure of Cadmus in Greek mythology, both associated with dragons/serpents.

The Marvel Comics character Eternity has called himself Adam Qadmon.

In Persona 5 Royal, the ultimate Persona of the antagonist Takuto Maruki is named Adam Kadmon.

== See also ==
- Adam and Eve
- Adam-God Doctrine
- Original Sin
