= Lurianic Kabbalah =

School of kabbalah named after Isaac Luria (1534–1572)

Lurianic Kabbalah is a school of Kabbalah named after Isaac Luria (1534–1572), the Jewish rabbi who developed it. Lurianic Kabbalah gave a seminal new account of Kabbalistic thought that its followers synthesised with, and read into, the earlier Kabbalah of the Zohar that had disseminated in Medieval circles.

Lurianic Kabbalah describes new doctrines of the origins of Creation, and the concepts of Olam HaTohu (Hebrew: עולם התהו "The World of Tohu-Chaos") and Olam HaTikun (Hebrew: עולם התיקון "The World of Tikun-Rectification"), which represent two archetypal spiritual states of being and consciousness. These concepts derive from Isaac Luria's interpretation of and mythical speculations on references in the Zohar. The main popularizer of Luria's ideas was Rabbi Hayyim ben Joseph Vital of Calabria, who claimed to be the official interpreter of the Lurianic system, though some disputed this claim. Together, the compiled teachings written by Luria's school after his death are metaphorically called "Kitvei HaARI" (Writings of the ARI), though they differed on some core interpretations in the early generations.

Previous interpretations of the Zohar had culminated in the rationally influenced scheme of Moses ben Jacob Cordovero in Safed, immediately before Luria's arrival. Both Cordovero's and Luria's systems gave Kabbalah a theological systemisation to rival the earlier eminence of Medieval Jewish philosophy. Under the influence of the mystical renaissance in 16th-century Safed, Lurianism became the near-universal mainstream Jewish theology in the early-modern era, both in scholarly circles and in the popular imagination. The Lurianic scheme, read by its followers as harmonious with, and successively more advanced than the Cordoverian, mostly displaced it, becoming the foundation of subsequent developments in Jewish mysticism. After the Ari, the Zohar was interpreted in Lurianic terms, and later esoteric Kabbalists expanded mystical theory within the Lurianic system. The later Hasidic and Mitnagdic movements diverged over implications of Lurianic Kabbalah, and its social role in popular mysticism. The Sabbatean mystical tradition would also derive its source from Lurianic messianism, but had a different understanding of the Kabbalistic interdependence of mysticism with Halakha Jewish observance.

== Lurianic thought ==
Where the messianic aim remained only peripheral in the linear scheme of Cordovero, the more comprehensive theoretical scheme and meditative practices of Luria explained messianism as its central dynamic, incorporating the full diversity of previous Kabbalistic concepts as outcomes of its processes. Luria conceptualises the Spiritual Worlds through their inner dimension of Divine exile and redemption. The Lurianic mythos brought deeper Kabbalistic notions to the fore: theodicy (primordial origin of evil) and exile of the Shekhinah (Divine Presence), eschatological redemption, the cosmic role of each individual and the historical affairs of Israel, symbolism of sexuality in the supernal Divine manifestations, and the unconscious dynamics in the soul. Luria gave esoteric theosophical articulations to the most fundamental and theologically daring questions of existence.

=== Kabbalist views ===
Religious Kabbalists see the deeper comprehensiveness of Lurianic theory being due to its description and exploration of aspects of Divinity, rooted in the Ein Sof, that transcend the revealed, rationally apprehended mysticism described by Cordovero. The system of Medieval Kabbalah becomes incorporated as part of its wider dynamic. Where Cordovero described the Sefirot (Divine attributes) and the Four spiritual Realms, preceded by Adam Kadmon, unfolding sequentially out of the Ein Sof, Luria probed the supra-rational origin of these Five Worlds within the Infinite. This revealed new doctrines of Primordial Tzimtzum (contraction) and the Shevira (shattering) and reconfiguration of the sephirot. In Kabbalah, what preceded more deeply in origins, is also reflected within the inner dimensions of subsequent Creation, so that Luria was able to explain messianism, Divine aspects, and reincarnation, Kabbalistic beliefs that remained unsystemised beforehand.

Cordovero and Medieval attempts at Kabbalistic systemisation, influenced by Medieval Jewish philosophy, approach Kabbalistic theory through the rationally conceived paradigm of "Hishtalshelut" (sequential "Evolution" of spiritual levels between the Infinite and the Finite - the vessels/external frames of each spiritual World). Luria systemises Kabbalah as a dynamic process of "Hitlabshut" ("Enclothement" of higher souls within lower vessels - the inner/soul dimensions of each spiritual World). This sees inner dimensions within any level of Creation, whose origin transcends the level in which they are enclothed. The spiritual paradigm of Creation is transformed into a dynamical interactional process in Divinity. Divine manifestations enclothe within each other, and are subject to exile and redemption:

The concept of hitlabshut ("enclothement") implies a radical shift of focus in considering the nature of Creation. According to this perspective, the chief dynamic of Creation is not evolutionary, but rather interactional. Higher strata of reality are constantly enclothing themselves within lower strata, like the soul within a body, thereby infusing every element of Creation with an inner force that transcends its own position within the universal hierarchy. Hitlabshut is very much a "biological" dynamic, accounting for the life-force which resides within Creation; hishtalshelut, on the other hand, is a "physical" one, concerned with the condensed-energy of "matter" (spiritual vessels) rather than the life-force of the soul.

Due to this deeper, more internal paradigm, the new doctrines Luria introduced explain Kabbalistic teachings and passages in the Zohar that remained superficially understood and externally described before. Seemingly unrelated concepts become unified as part of a comprehensive, deeper picture. Kabbalistic systemisers before Luria, culminating with Cordovero, were influenced by Maimonides' philosophical Guide, in their quest to decipher the Zohar intellectually, and unify esoteric wisdom with Jewish philosophy. In Kabbalah this embodies the Neshama (Understanding) mental level of the soul. The teachings of Luria challenge the soul to go beyond mental limitations. Though presented in intellectual terms, it remains a revealed, supra-rational doctrine, giving a sense of being beyond intellectual grasp. This corresponds to the soul level of Haya (Wisdom insight), described as "touching/not-touching" apprehension.

==== Academic views ====
In the academic study of Kabbalah, Gershom Scholem saw Lurianism as a historically located response to the trauma of Spanish exile, a fully expressed mythologising of Judaism, and a uniquely paradoxically messianic mysticism, as mysticism phenomenologically usually involves withdrawal from community. In more recent academia, Moshe Idel has challenged Scholem's historical influence in Lurianism, seeing it instead as an evolving development within the inherent factors of Jewish mysticism by itself. In his monograph Physician of the Soul, Healer of the Cosmos: Isaac Luria and His Kabbalistic Fellowship, Stanford University Press, 2003, Lawrence Fine explores the world of Isaac Luria from the point of view of the lived experience of Luria and his disciples.

== Influence ==
=== Sabbatean mystical heresies ===
Lurianic Kabbalah has been accused by some of being the cause of the spread of the Sabbatean Messiahs Shabbetai Tzvi (1626–1676) and Jacob Frank (1726–1791), and their Kabbalistically based heresies. The 16th century mystical renaissance in Safed, led by Moshe Cordovero, Joseph Karo and Isaac Luria, made Kabbalistic study a popular goal of Jewish students, to some extent competing for attention with Talmudic study, while also capturing the hold of the public imagination. Shabbeteanism emerged in this atmosphere, coupled with the oppressions of Exile, alongside genuine traditional mystic circles.

Where Isaac Luria's scheme emphasised the democratic role of every person in redeeming the fallen sparks of holiness, allocating the Messiah only a conclusive arrival in the process, Shabbetai's prophet Nathan of Gaza interpreted his messianic role as pivotal in reclaiming those sparks lost in impurity. Now faith in his messianic role, after he apostasised to Islam, became necessary, as well as faith in his antinomian actions. Jacob Frank claimed to be a reincarnation of Shabbetai Tzvi, sent to reclaim sparks through the most anarchist actions of his followers, claiming the breaking of the Torah in his emerged messianic era was now its fulfilment, the opposite of the messianic necessity of Halakhic devotion by Luria and the Kabbalists. Instead, for the elite 16th century Kabbalists of Safed after the Expulsion from Spain, they sensed a personal national responsibility, expressed through their mystical renaissance, ascetic strictures, devoted brotherhood, and close adherence to normative Jewish practice.

=== Influence on ritual practice and prayer meditation ===
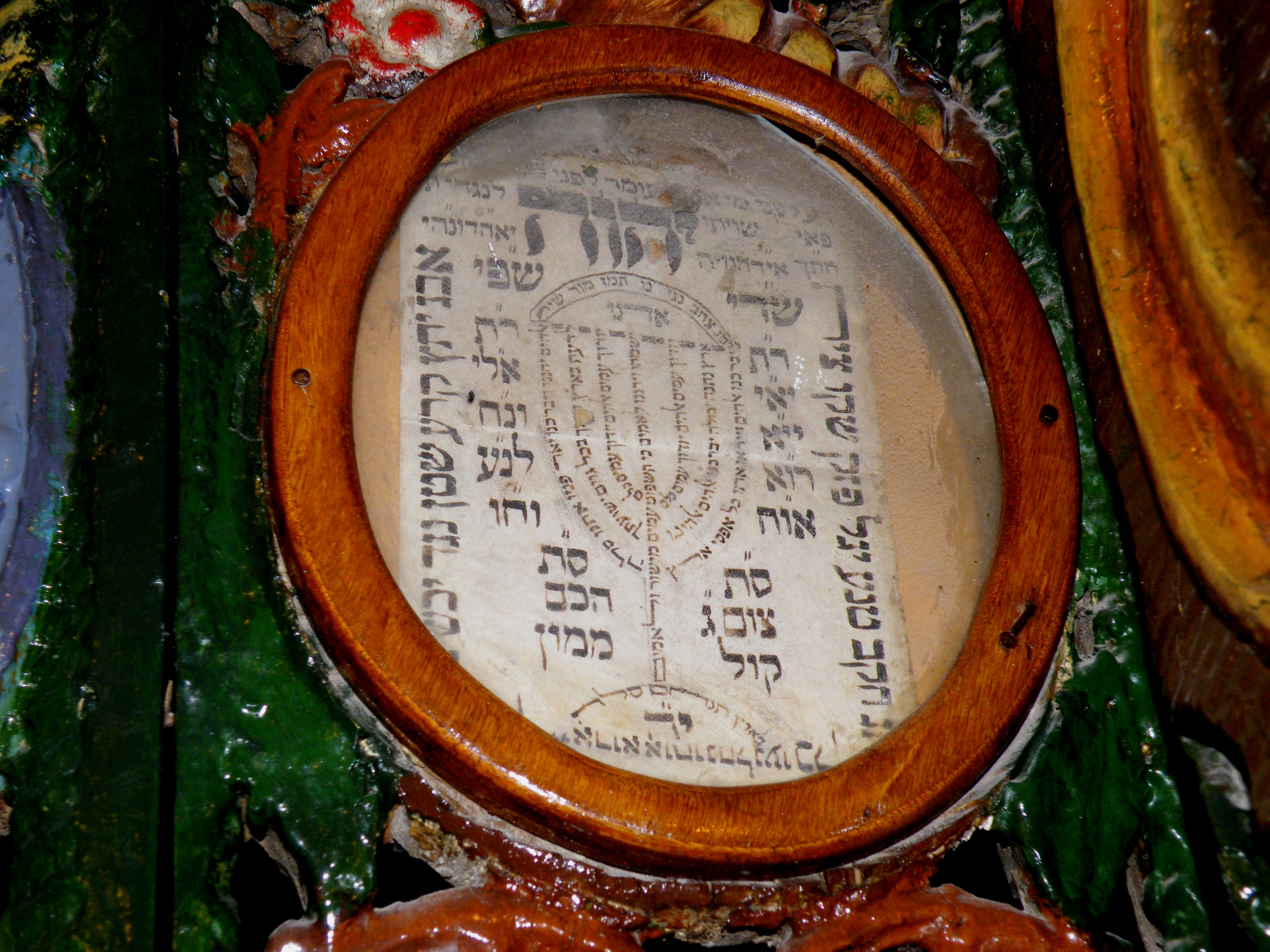
Kabbalistic chart of Divine names in Ari synagogue. Traditional Lurianic prayer method involved esoteric kavanot meditations on specific Divine letter permutations related to each prayer

Lurianic Kabbalah remained the leading school of mysticism in Judaism, and is an important influence on Hasidism and Sefardic kabbalists. In fact, only a minority of today's Jewish mystics belong to other branches of thought in Zoharic mysticism. Some Jewish kabbalists have said that the followers of Shabbetai Tzvi strongly avoided teachings of Lurianic Kabbalah because his system disproved their notions. On the other hand, the Shabbetians did use the Lurianic concepts of sparks trapped in impurity and pure souls being mixed with the impure to justify some of their antinomian actions.

Luria introduced his mystic system into religious observance. Every commandment had a particular mystic meaning. The Shabbat with all its ceremonies was looked upon as the embodiment of the Divinity in temporal life, and every ceremony performed on that day was considered to have an influence upon the superior world. Every word and syllable of the prescribed prayers contain hidden names of God upon which one should meditate devoutly while reciting. New mystic ceremonies were ordained and codified under the name of Shulkhan Arukh HaARI (The "Code of Law of the Ari"). In addition, one of the few writings of Luria himself comprises three Sabbath table hymns with mystical allusions. From the third meal's hymn:

You princes of the palace, who yearn to behold the splendour of Zeir Anpin
Be present at this meal at which the King leaves His imprint
Exult, rejoice in this gathering together with the angels and all supernal beings
Rejoice now, at this most propitious time, when there is no sadness...
I herewith invite the Ancient of Days at this auspicious time, and impurity will be utterly removed...

In keeping with the custom of engaging in all-night Torah study on the festival of Shavuot, Isaac Luria arranged a special service for the night vigil of Shavuot, the Tikkun Leil Shavuot ("Rectification for Shavuot Night"). It is commonly recited in synagogue, with Kaddish if the Tikkun is studied in a group of ten. Afterwards, Hasidim immerse in a mikveh before dawn.

=== Modern Jewish spirituality and dissenting views ===
Rabbi Luria's ideas enjoy wide recognition among Jews today. Orthodox as well as Reform, Reconstructionist and members of other Jewish groups frequently acknowledge a moral obligation to "repair the world" (tikkun olam). This idea draws upon Luria's teaching that shards of divinity remain contained in flawed material creation and that ritual and ethical deeds by the righteous help to release this energy. The mystical theology of the Ari does not exercise the same level of influence everywhere, however. Communities where Luria's thought holds less sway include many German and Modern Orthodox communities, groups carrying forward Spanish and Portuguese traditions, a sizable segment of Baladi Yemenite Jews (see Dor Daim), and other groups that follow a form of Torah Judaism based more on classical authorities like Maimonides and the Geonim.

With its Rationalist project, the 19th century Haskalah movement and the critical study of Judaism dismissed Kabbalah. In the 20th century, Gershom Scholem initiated the academic study of Jewish mysticism, utilising historical methodology, but reacting against what he saw as its exclusively Rationalist dogma. Rather, he identified Jewish mysticism as the vital undercurrent of Jewish thought, periodically renewing Judaism with new mystical or messianic impetus. The 20th century academic respect of Kabbalah, as well as wider interest in spirituality, bolster a renewed Kabbalistic interest from non-Orthodox Jewish denominations in the 20th century. This is often expressed through the form of Hasidic incorporation of Kabbalah, embodied in Neo-Hasidism and Jewish Renewal.

=== Contemporary traditional Lurianism ===
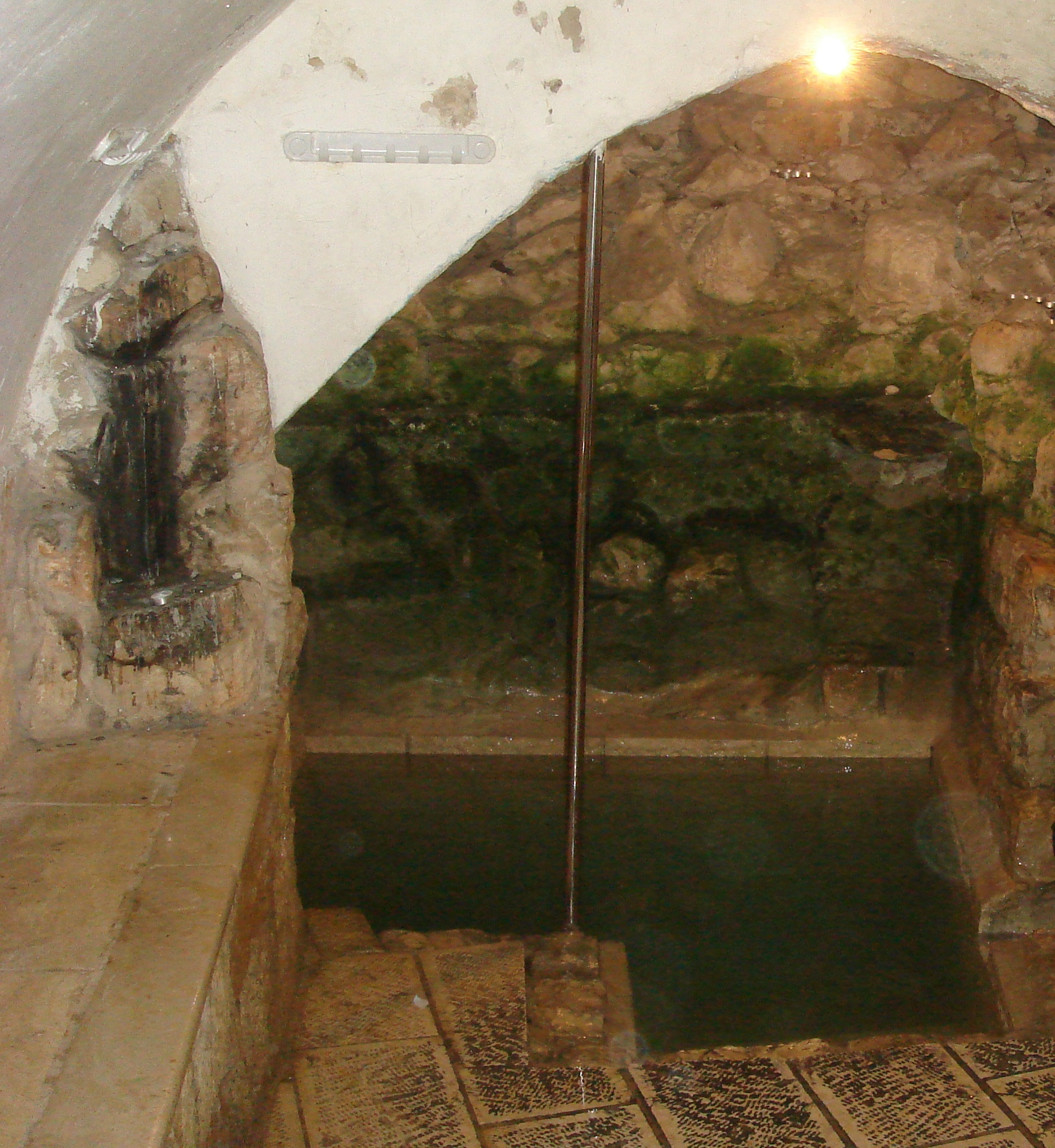
Mikveh of Isaac Luria on the hillside below Safed in the Galilee, fed by a cold spring

Study of the Kitvei Ha'Ari (writings of Isaac Luria's disciples) continues mostly today among traditional-form Kabbalistic circles and in sections of the Hasidic movement. Mekubalim mizrahim (oriental Sephardi Kabbalists), following the tradition of Haim Vital and the mystical legacy of the Rashash (1720–1777, considered by Kabbalists to be the reincarnation of the Ari), see themselves as direct heirs to and in continuity with Luria's teachings and meditative scheme.

Both sides of the Hasidic-Mitnagdic schism from the 18th century, upheld the theological world view of Lurianic Kabbalah. It is a misconception to see the Rabbinic opposition to Hasidic Judaism, at least in its formative origin, as deriving from adherence to Rationalist Medieval Jewish philosophical method. The leader of the Rabbinic Mitnagdic opposition to the mystical Hasidic revival, the Vilna Gaon (1720–1797), was intimately involved in Kabbalah, following Lurianic theory, and produced Kabbalistically focused writing himself, while criticising Medieval Jewish Rationalism. His disciple, Chaim Volozhin, the main theoretician of Mitnagdic Judaism, differed from Hasidism over practical interpretation of the Lurianic tzimtzum. For all intents, Mitnagdic Judaism followed a transcendent stress in tzimtzum, while Hasidism stressed the immanence of God. This theoretical difference led Hasidism to popular mystical focus beyond elitist restrictions, while it underpinned the Mitnagdic focus on Talmudic, non-mystical Judaism for all but the elite, with a new theoretical emphasis on Talmudic Torah study in the Lithuanian Yeshiva movement.

The largest scale Jewish development based on Lurianic teaching was Hasidism, though it adapted Kabbalah to its own thought. Joseph Dan describes the Hasidic-Mitnagdic schism as a battle between two conceptions of Lurianic Kabbalah. Mitnagdic elite Kabbalah was essentially loyal to Lurianic teaching and practice, while Hasidism introduced new popularised ideas, such as the centrality of Divine immanence and Deveikut to all Jewish activity, and the social mystical role of the Tzadik Hasidic leadership.

=== Literal and non-literal interpretations of the Tzimtzum ===
In the decades after Luria and in the early 18th century, different opinions formed among Kabbalists over the meaning of tzimtzum, the Divine self-withdrawal: should it be taken literally or symbolically? Immanuel Hai Ricci (Yosher Levav, 1736–7) took tzimtzum literally, while Joseph Ergas (Shomer Emunim, 1736) and Abraham Herrera held that tzimtzum was to be understood metaphorically.

=== Hasidic and Mitnagdic views of the Tzimtzum ===
The issue of the tzimtzum underpinned the new, public popularisation of mysticism embodied in 18th century Hasidism. Its central doctrine of almost-Panentheistic Divine Immanence, shaping daily fervour, emphasised the most non-literal stress of the tzimtzum. The systematic articulation of this Hasidic approach by Shneur Zalman of Liadi in the second section of Tanya, outlines a Monistic Illusionism of Creation from the Upper Divine Unity perspective. To Schneur Zalman, the tzimtzum only affected apparent concealment of the Ohr Ein Sof. The Ein Sof, and the Ohr Ein Sof, actually remain omnipresent, this world nullified into its source. Only, from the Lower, Worldly Divine Unity perspective, the tzimtzum gives the illusion of apparent withdrawal. In truth, "I, the Eternal, I have not changed" (Malachi 3:6), as interpreting the tzimtzum with any literal tendency would be ascribing false corporeality to God.

Norman Lamm describes the alternative Hasidic-Mitnagdic interpretations of this. To Chaim Volozhin, the main theoretician of the Mitnagdim Rabbinic opposition to Hasidism, the illusionism of Creation, arising from a metaphorical tzimtzum is true, but does not lead to Panentheism, as Mitnagdic theology emphasised Divine transcendence, where Hasidism emphasised immanence. As it is, the initial general impression of Lurianic Kabbalah is one of transcendence, implied by the notion of tzimtzum. Rather, to Hasidic thought, especially in its Chabad systemisation, the Atzmus ultimate Divine essence is expressed only in finitude, emphasising Hasidic Immanence. Norman Lamm sees both thinkers as subtle and sophisticated. The Mitnagdim disagreed with Panentheism, in the early opposition of the Mitnagdic leader, the Vilna Gaon seeing it as heretical. Chaim Volzhin, the leading pupil of the Vilna Gaon, was at the same time both more moderate, seeking to end the conflict, and most theologically principled in his opposition to the Hasidic interpretation. He opposed panentheism as both theology and practice, as its mystical spiritualisation of Judaism displaced traditional Talmudic learning, as was liable to inspire antinomian blurring of Halachah Jewish observance strictures, in quest of a mysticism for the common folk.

As Norman Lamm summarises, to Schneur Zalman and Hasidism, God relates to the world as a reality, through His Immanence. Divine immanence - the Human perspective, is pluralistic, allowing mystical popularisation in the material world, while safeguarding Halacha. Divine Transcendence - the Divine perspective, is Monistic, nullifying Creation into illusion. To Chaim Volozhin and Mitnagdism, God relates to the world as it is through His transcendence. Divine immanence - the way God looks at physical Creation, is Monistic, nullifying it into illusion. Divine Transcendence - the way Man perceives and relates to Divinity is pluralistic, allowing Creation to exist on its own terms. In this way, both thinkers and spiritual paths affirm a non-literal interpretation of the tzimtzum, but Hasidic spirituality focuses on the nearness of God, while Mitnagdic spirituality focuses on the remoteness of God. They then configure their religious practice around this theological difference, Hasidism placing Deveikut fervour as its central practice, Mitnagdism further emphasising intellectual Talmudic Torah study as its supreme religious activity.

== See also ==
- Kabbalah
