= List of angels in theology =

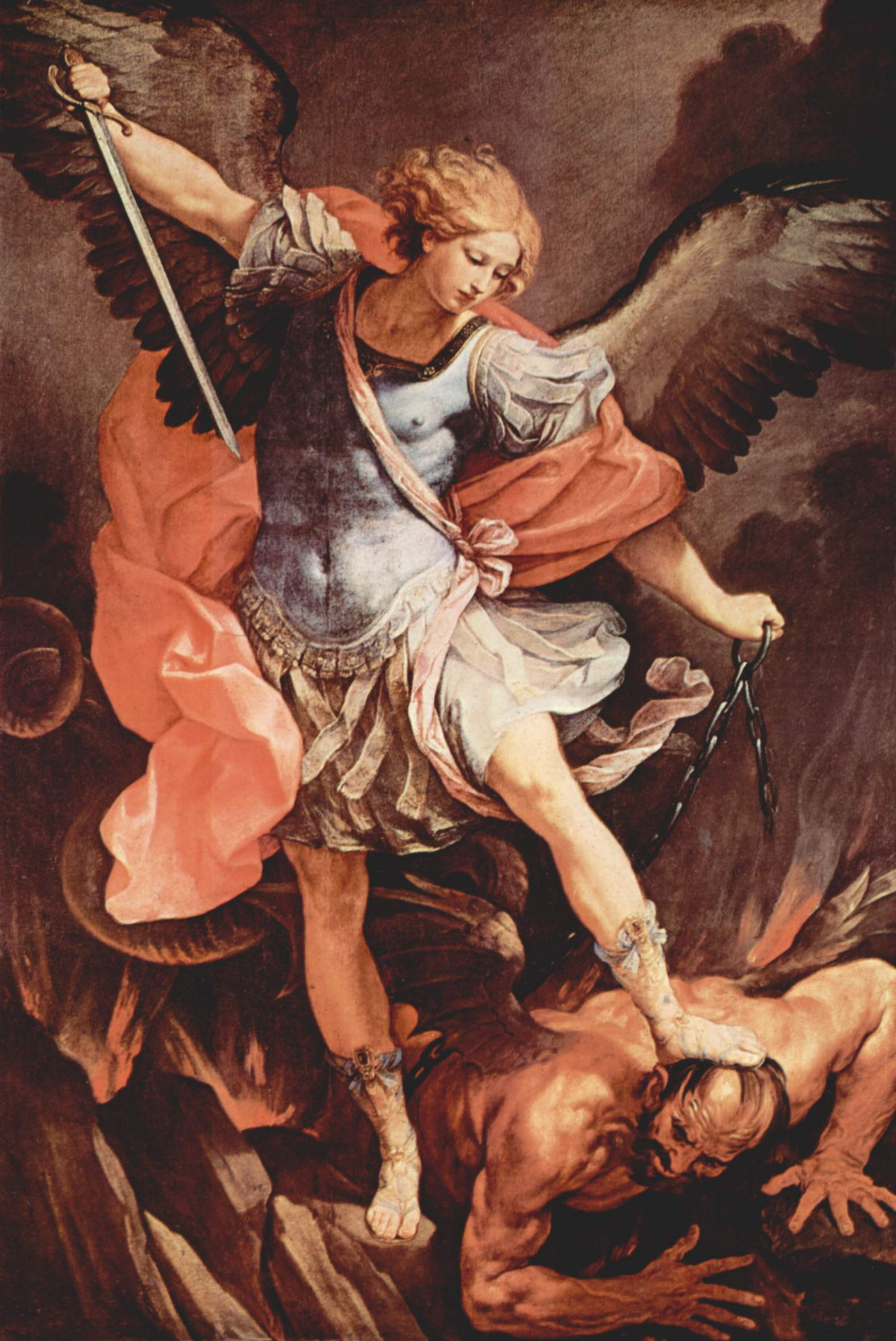
Archangel Michael defeating the Archdemon Satan.

This is a list of angels in religion, theology, astrology, and magic, including both specific angels (e.g., Gabriel) and types of angels (e.g., seraphim).

== List ==
=== Groups ===
Hierarchical Groups
Name	Alternate Names	Role(s)/Domain(s)	Religion(s)
Chayot Ha Kodesh	Chayot, Living creatures	A notable group in the hierarchy of angels (1st in the Mishneh Torah and Reshit Chochmah, 4th in the Zohar) (Judaism) Holders of the firmament	Judaism, Christianity
Ophanim (Note: These beings are not always considered as angels.)	Ophanim (plural), Galgalim (plural), sometimes identified as Thrones	A notable group in the hierarchy of angels (2nd in the Mishneh Torah and Maseket Atzilut and Reshit Chochmah, 5th in the Zohar, 9th in the Berit Menuchah) (Judaism) Wheels of the Heavenly Chariot (Merkabah)	Judaism, Christianity
Thrones	Sometimes identified as Ophanim		Judaism, Christianity
Erelim	Valiant Ones	A notable group in the hierarchy of angels (1st among the ten orders of angels in the Berit Menuchah, 2nd in the Zohar, 3rd in the Mishneh Torah, and 10th in the Maseket Azilut.) (Judaism); Appear in moments of death and national tragedy	Judaism
Hashmal	'Amber', Sometimes identified as Dominions	A notable group in the hierarchy of angels (4th in the Mishneh Torah, 5th in the Berit Menuchah, 6th in the Zohar, 7th in the Maseket Atzilut and Reshit Chochmah) (Judaism)	Judaism, Christianity
Dominions	Kyriotetes, Lordships	Governors of the movements of celestial bodies	Judaism, Christianity
Seraph	Seraphim (plural)	A notable group in the hierarchy of angels (1st in the Maseket Atzilut, 3rd in the Zohar and Reshit Chochmah, 5th in the Mishneh Torah, 10th in the Berit Menuchah) (Judaism)	Judaism, Christianity
Malak	Malakim (plural)	A notable group in the hierarchy of angels (1st in the Zohar, 4th in the Berit Menuchah, 6th in the Mishneh Torah, 8th in the Maseket Atzilut, 9th in the Reshit Chochmah) (Judaism); Messenger angels	Judaism
Elohim	Deities, godly beings who are not the Supreme God	A notable group in the hierarchy of angels (7th in the Mishneh Torah, 8th in the Zohar) (Judaism)	Judaism
Bene Elohim	Sons of God	A notable group in the hierarchy of angels (3rd in the Berit Menuchah, 8th in the Mishneh Torah, and 9th in the Zohar and Maseket Atzilut) (Judaism)	Judaism, Christianity
Cherub	Cherubim (plural)	A notable group in the hierarchy of angels (3rd in the Maseket Atzilut, 4th in the Reshit Chochmah, 8th in the Berit Menuchah, 9th in the Mishneh Torah) (Judaism)	Judaism, Christianity, Islam
Ishim	Man-like angels	A notable group in the hierarchy of angels (2th in the Berit Menuchah, 6th in the Maseket Atzilut, 10th in the Zohar and Mishneh Torah and Reshit Chochmah) (Judaism) Lowly angels which are assigned to speak with the mortal prophets and appear to them in visions.	Judaism
Powers	Authorities	The angels who have power over evil to keep balance and order.	Judaism, Christianity
Virtues		The angels who assist and give miracles. They govern elements and strengthen relation to God. The conduit of spirits (in gnosticism). They transmit divine energy empowering souls to face over challenges.	Judaism, Christianity
Principalities	Princedom, Rulers	The guardian prince of nation. Angels who protects cities and nation.	Judaism, Christianity
Archangels (rank)			Judaism, Christianity
Angels (rank)		Lowest rank of angels in most interpretations	Judaism, Christianity

Categorical Groups
Name	Alternate Names	Role(s)/Domain(s)	Religion(s)
Archangel (Title)		A title designated to angels of the highest rank, generally a specifically named angel.	Judaism, Christianity, Islam
Chalkydri	Kalkydra	Carriers of the Sun's heat	Judaism, Christianity
Destroying angels	Memitim, Mashḥit, spoilers, ravagers	Angels of testing, punishment, and destruction. They test the resolve and faith of mortals by tempting them, akin to sabotage, then accuse and judge them, and finally punish and torment both wicked humans and angels.	Judaism, Christianity
Fallen angels		Sparks of the higher, spiritual realm (Pleroma) who fell into Kenoma to teach humanity through sins.	Judaism, Christianity
Hamalat al-Arsh	Bearers of the Throne	Bearing the throne of God	Islam
Kabbalistic angels	'The Explicit Name'; Angels of the Shem HaMephorash	A list of 72 celestial spirits of the 9 choir orders, whose names with esoteric meaning are derived from the 72-fold name of the Hebrew god as found in the Book of Exodus	
Kiraman Katibin		Recorders of human thoughts, acts and feelings	Islam
Luminary		An angel-like being. They are considered to be emanations of the supreme divine triad consisting of the Father (Invisible Spirit), the Mother (Barbelo), and the Child (Autogenes)	Judaism (Gnosticism)
Mu’aqqibat	Hafaza		Islam
Nephilim		In some sources, their origin is disputed as being the offspring of angels and human mortals. These individuals would grow to be "the heroes of old, the men of renown".	Judaism (Enoch)
Recording angels		Record-keepers	Judaism, Christianity
Song-Uttering Choirs		Multiple domains, as they are composed of multiple orders	Judaism
Uthra		Benevolent beings that live in škinas (ࡔࡊࡉࡍࡀ, "celestial dwellings") in the World of Light (alma ḏ-nhūra) and communicate with each other via telepathy. They serve as guardians (naṭra) and act as "divine messengers of the light"	Mandaeism
Watcher	Grigori, Guardian angels	Angels whose role was to watch over humanity and supervise their development. Angels such as Uriel, Raphael, Raguel, Michael, Sariel, Gabriel, and Ramiel. Mentioned in the Sefer Raziel HaMalakh, the Zohar, and Jubilees, 200 angels had fallen into disgrace—20 of whom were leaders. One of the angels, Yeqon, was the ringleader who first tempted the other Watchers into having sexual relations with humans; His accomplices were Asbeel, Gadreel, Penemue, and Kasdeja, who were all identified as individual "satans".	Judaism, Christianity
Zodiac angels	Archangels of the Zodiac	Twelve archangels that rule over the 12 signs of the Zodiac.	Judaism, Christianity
Jinn	Djinn, Genies	Spirits or supernatural beings—akin to angels—but are vulnerable to the concept of free will, like the Fallen angels, and sometimes take a similar role in Islamic stories.	Islam
Tennin			Japanese Buddhism

=== Individual angels ===
Name(s)			Affiliations and Type			Role(s)/Domain(s)	Source / Reference
Original / Common name	Transliterations, alternate names, and titles	Name meaning	Religion(s)	Rank	Category	Role(s)/Domain(s)	Source / Reference
Abaddon	Apollyon, Exterminans	'Destroyer'	Judaism, Christianity	Thrones	Archangel	Angel of Death; Lord of the bottomless pit	
Abatur	Abatur Rama, Abatur Muzania, Ancient of Days, The Third Life, Yawar, Bhaq Ziwa	'Father of the excellencies'	Gnosticism (Mandaeism)		Uthra	Father of the Uthras	
Abdiel		'Servant of El'/El's servant	Christianity				
Achaiah		Forbearance of God'/'God is forbearing'	Judaism (Kabbalah)	Seraphim	Kabbalistic angel	Opposes and rules over the demon Amon	
Adathan			Gnosticism (Mandaeism)		Uthra	Guardian of the "first river", stands at the Gate of Life	
Adriel		'Flock of God' 'My help is God, of God's flock'	Judaism, Christianity				
Advachiel	Adnachiel, Aduachiel, Adnakhiel, and Adernahael		Judaism, Christianity		Guardian Angel, Zodiac angel	Angel of the Month of November and the Zodiac of Sagittarius; Represents the thighs and buttocks of the human body	
Af					Mashḥit	Angel of wrath, represents the wrath of God	
Agiel	Zazel		Judaism, Christianity	Seraph	Archangel	The Intelligence Angels of all kinds, Guardian Angel of Saturn	
Aker			Judaism, Christianity		Archangel	One of nine Angels of the end of Earth	
Aladiah		God is favorable'	Judaism (Kabbalah)	Cherubim	Kabbalistic angel	Opposes and rules over the demon Buer	
Ambriel		'Orator of God'	Judaism, Christianity	Thrones	Guardian Angel, Zodiac angel	Angel of the Month of May and the Zodiac of Gemini; Represents the arms of the human body	
Ananiel		'Rain of God', 'Cloud of God', 'Storm of God'	Christianity		Watcher	Angel of water, guard of the gates of the South Wind	
Anauel		God is infinitely good'	Judaism (Kabbalah)	Archangels	Kabbalistic angel	Opposes and rules over the demon Andras	
Aniel	Anael	Grace of God'/'God is Gracious'/'God is my grace'; 'God, Lord of virtues'	Judaism (Kabbalah)	Powers	Kabbalistic angel	Opposes and rules over the demon Phenex	
Anush			Gnosticism (Mandaeism)		Uthra	Teacher of John the Baptist, miracle worker in Jerusalem	
Arakiel	Araciel, Arakiba, Araqael, Araqiel, Arkas, Arkiel, Arqael, Sarquael Aretstikapha	'Earth of God', 'the Land of the Mighty One', 'The Mighty Land' 'World of distortion'	Judaism, Christianity		Watcher, Archangel	Teacher of the "signs of the earth" (geomancy) One of the five Watcher satans	
Arariel	Azariel		Judaism			Angel of rivers, waters of the earth, curer of stupidity	
Ariel			Judaism, Christianity		Archangel	Lion of God, Angel of nature elements	
Armaros	Armoni, Armoniel	'Curse of God'/God has cursed, 'Cursed one'	Judaism, Christianity		Watcher	Angel of deceit	
Arphugitonos			Judaism, Christianity		Archangel	One of nine Angels of the end of Earth	
Artiya'il			Islam (unconfirmed)			Removes human grief, sadness and anxiety	
Asaliah		God the just judge'	Judaism (Kabbalah)	Virtues	Kabbalistic angel	Opposes and rules over the demon Vual	
Asbeel		'Deserter/Forsaker of God'/'God has deserted/forsaken'	Christianity		Fallen angel, Watcher	Angel of destruction, one of the five Watcher satans	
Asmodel		'Destroyer of God's enemies'	Judaism, Christianity	Cherubim	Guardian Angel, Zodiac angel	Angel of the Month of April and the Zodiac of Taurus; Represents the neck of the human body	
Azazel	sometimes identified with Samael (Judaism), Lucifer (Christianity), or Azazil (Arabic)	'Strength of God', 'God's Ruggedness' 'God's scapegoat', 'God has sent away', 'God's Abandoned'	Judaism, Christianity, Islam, Yazdânism	Cherubim	Archangel, Watcher, Guardian (k̲h̲azana) of paradise.	(Domains of Samael may also apply to)	
Azrael	Ashriel Malʾak al-Mawt (Arabic)	'Help from God'	Judaism, Christianity		The Death	Psychopomp	
Barachiel		'God has blessed'	Judaism, Christianity		Guardian Angel, Archangel	Chief of the guardian angels	
Baraqiel	Baraqel, Baraqijal, Barchiel	'Lightning of God'	Judaism, Christianity		Watcher, Guardian Angel, Archangel, Zodiac angel	Angel of the Month of February and the Zodiac of Pisces; Represents the feet of the human body; Thunderstorm/Lightning, Teacher of astrology	
Barbiel	Barbuel, Barubiel, Varviel	'Sincerity of El'/'Purity of God'	Judaism, Christianity		Guardian Angel, Zodiac angel	Angel of the Month of October and the Zodiac of Scorpio; Represents the genitals of the human body;	
Beburos			Judaism, Christianity		Archangel	One of nine Angels of the end of Earth	
Bezaliel		'God's Shadow'/'In the Shadow of God'	Judaism, Christianity		Watcher		
Bihram Rabba			Gnosticism (Mandaeism)		Uthra	Presides over the masbuta, or baptism ritual	
Cahethel		God is adored'/'The adored God'	Judaism (Kabbalah)	Seraphim	Kabbalistic angel	Opposes and rules over the demon Barbatos	
Caliel		Invocation of God'/'God is Invocable'/'The invocable God'	Judaism (Kabbalah)	Thrones	Kabbalistic angel	Opposes and rules over the demon Bathin	
Cambiel	Cafziel, Cafzyel, Caphziel, Kambriel	'Exalter of God', 'Maker of God'	Judaism, Christianity (Orthodox Christianity)	Principalities	Archangel, Zodiac Angel	One of nine Angels of the end of Earth; Angel of the Month of January and the Zodiac of Aquarius; Represents the legs and ankles of the human body; Angel of Transformation, Metaphysics and a guardian Angel with a watcher named Tamiel	
Cassiel	Cassael, Casziel, Kasiel	'God is my wrath', 'God is my leap'	Judaism, Christianity		Archangel	Angel of Solitude and Tears	
Chamuel	Qafsiel, Qaphsiel, Qaspiel, Qephetzial, Quaphsiel		Orthodox Christianity		Archangel	Angel of Serenity and Devotion	
Chauakiah		Joy of God'/'God is Joyous'/'The God of joy'	Judaism (Kabbalah)	Powers	Kabbalistic angel	Opposes and rules over the demon Marchosias	
Chazaqiel		'Cloud of God'/'God's Cloud, 'Shooting Star of God'/'God's Shooting Star	Judaism, Christianity		Watcher	Angel of the skies, Teacher of meteorology	
Dadrail			Yazdânism		Archangel (in Yazdanism)		
Damabiah		Wisdom of God'/'God, the source of wisdom'	Judaism (Kabbalah)	Angels	Kabbalistic angel	Opposes and rules over the demon Andrealphus	
Daniel	Dânêl	'God has judged'	Judaism, Christianity		Watcher	Teacher of the "signs of the sun" (Heliomancy)	
Daveithai			Gnosticism (Sethianism)		Luminary		
Dobiel		"El is my Bear"	Judaism			Guardian angel of Ancient Persia	
Dumah		'Silence'	Judaism			Angel of silence and of the stillness of death, the wicked dead	
Eiael		'Pleased by God'/'God is pleasing'/'God, the pleasure of man's children'	Judaism (Kabbalah)	Angels	Kabbalistic angel	Opposes and rules over the demon Amdusias	
Eleleth			Gnosticism (Sethianism)		Luminary		
Elemiah		Hidden by God'/'God is hidden'/'The hidden God'	Judaism (Kabbalah)	Seraphim	Kabbalistic angel	Opposes and rules over the demon Samigina	
Exael					Watchers	Taught humans how to build engines of war	
Etinsib Ziwa		'Splendid Transplant'	Gnosticism (Mandaeism)		Uthra	Starts battle against Nbaṭ	
Gabriel	Jibreel (Arabic), sometimes Melek Taus	'Man of God'	Judaism, Christianity, Islam, Gnosticism (Mandaeism), Yazdânism, Yazidism	Cherubim, one of the Seraphim	Archangel	One of nine Angels of the end of Earth; Destruction (in Judaism), Messenger, General of Military, Leader of All-Angels (in Islam), God's Left Hand, Ruhul Quddus (in Islam), Ruhul Amin (in Islam), Seven Mysteries (Yazidism)	
Gabuthelon			Judaism, Christianity		Archangel	One of nine Angels of the end of Earth	
Gadreel	Gadriel, Gadrel	'Wall of God', 'the helper of God'	Judaism, Christianity	Cherubim	Watcher	One of the five Watcher satans	
Gamaliel		'Recompense of God'	Judaism, Christianity	Cherubim	Archangel	Angel of protection and strength, Angel of Cherubims	
Garshanel	Garzanal		Judaism			Angel who wards off evil spirits	
Gubran	Gubran Uthra		Gnosticism (Mandaeism)		Uthra	Helps Nbaṭ lead a rebellion against Yushamin and his 21 sons	
Haaiah		'Spy of God'/'God is eavesdropping'/'God listening in concealment'	Judaism (Kabbalah)	Dominions	Kabbalistic angel	Opposes and rules over the demon Bune	
Haamiah			Judaism (Kabbalah)	Powers	Kabbalistic angel	Opposes and rules over the demon Halphas	
Habuhiah			Judaism (Kabbalah)	Angels	Kabbalistic angel	Opposes and rules over the demon Belial	
Hadraniel	Hadrianiel	'Majesty of God'/'God is Majestic	Judaism, Gnosticism			Gatekeeper of the Second Heavenly Gate	
Hahahel			Judaism (Kabbalah)	Virtues	Kabbalistic angel	Opposes and rules over the demon Focalor	
Hahaiah			Judaism (Kabbalah)	Cherubim	Kabbalistic angel	Opposes and rules over the demon Sitri	
Hahasiah			Judaism (Kabbalah), Christianity	Principalities	Kabbalistic angel	Opposes and rules over the demon Balam	
Hahuiah			Judaism (Kabbalah)	Thrones	Kabbalistic angel	Opposes and rules over the demon Naberius	
Haiaiel			Judaism (Kabbalah)	Angels	Kabbalistic angel	Opposes and rules over the demon Dantalion	
Hakamiah			Judaism (Kabbalah)	Cherubim	Kabbalistic angel	Opposes and rules over the demon Zepar	
Hamaliel		'Reverence of God'; 'Fear of God'	Judaism, Christianity	Virtues	Archangel, Zodiac angel	Angel of the Month of August and the Zodiac of Virgo; Represents the belly of the human body; Angel of Birth, Household and Harvest; leader of the Powers along with Archangel Gabriel as the subordinate	
Hanibal		'Grace of Baal'/'Baal is Gracious'	Ancient Mesopotamian religion			Angel of the god Baal Hadad	
Haniel	Hanael	'Oath of God'	Judaism, Christianity		Archangel, Zodiac angel	Angel of the Month of December and the Zodiac of Capricorn; Represents the knees of the human body; The Sephirah of Netzach; leader of the Principalities along with Archangel Netzach	
Harahel			Judaism (Kabbalah)	Archangels	Kabbalistic angel	Opposes and rules over the demon Orias	
Hariel			Judaism (Kabbalah)	Cherubim	Kabbalistic angel	Opposes and rules over the demon Eligos	
Harmozel			Gnosticism (Sethianism)		Luminary		
Harut			Islam		Testing angel	Sent as a test to the people of Babylon to see if they'd start learning sorcery even if the angel clarified multiple times that it is here as a test and to not abandon their faith by listening to it, was paired with Marut.	
Haziel			Judaism (Kabbalah)	Cherubim	Kabbalistic angel	Opposes and rules over the demon Paimon	
Hibil Ziwa	Yawar Hibil		Gnosticism (Mandaeism)		Uthra	Conquers the World of Darkness	
Hofniel			Judaism		Archangel		
Hutriel		'Rod of God'	Judaism, Christianity	Angels		Angel of Punishment	
Iabamiah			Judaism (Kabbalah)	Angels	Kabbalistic angel	Opposes and rules over the demon Seere	
Iahhel			Judaism (Kabbalah)	Archangels	Kabbalistic angel	Opposes and rules over the demon Valac	
Iehahel			Judaism (Kabbalah)	Seraphim	Kabbalistic angel	Opposes and rules over the demon Valefor	
Iehuiah			Judaism (Kabbalah)	Powers	Kabbalistic angel	Opposes and rules over the demon Gaap	
Ieiaiel			Judaism (Kabbalah)	Thrones	Kabbalistic angel	Opposes and rules over the demon Ipos	
Ieialel			Judaism (Kabbalah)	Archangels	Kabbalistic angel	Opposes and rules over the demon Amy	
Ieiazel			Judaism (Kabbalah)	Powers	Kabbalistic angel	Opposes and rules over the demon Raum	
Ielahiah			Judaism (Kabbalah)	Virtues	Kabbalistic angel	Opposes and rules over the demon Shax	
Ieliel			Judaism (Kabbalah)	Seraphim	Kabbalistic angel	Opposes and rules over the demon Agares	
Ierathel			Judaism (Kabbalah)	Dominions	Kabbalistic angel	Opposes and rules over the demon Ronove	
Iezalel			Judaism (Kabbalah)	Cherubim	Kabbalistic angel	Opposes and rules over the demon Beleth	
Imamiah			Judaism (Kabbalah), Christianity	Principalities	Kabbalistic angel	Opposes and rules over the demon Alloces	
Israfil	Israfel Raphael (often associated)		Islam		Archangel	Signals the beginning of the Day of Judgment by blowing a horn three times	
Kasbeel			Judaism			Oathkeeper	
Jegudiel	Jehudiel, Jhudiel		Christianity		Archangel	Responsibility and merciful love	
Jehoel	Yahoel		Judaism, Christianity	Seraphim		Angel of Fire Restraining Leviathan,	
Jequn	Yekun, Yakum, Yaqum, Yeqon	'HE shall rise'	Judaism, Christianity		Watcher	One of the five Watcher satans, the ringleader who first tempted the other Watchers into having sexual relations with humans	
Jerahmeel	Eremiel	'God shall have mercy'	Judaism, Christianity		Archangel		
Jophiel	Iophiel, Iofiel, Jofiel, Yofiel, Youfiel, Zophiel, Zuriel, Dina	'Beauty of God'/God is Beautiful, 'God is my watchman', 'God is my rock'	Judaism, Christianity		Archangel	Angel of Beauty, Art, Wisdom, Understanding, and Judgment; Metatron's companion	
Kadkadael {{Citation needed}}			Yazdânism, Hinduism, Orthodox Islam		Archangel, Guardian angel	One of heaven's guardian angel who followed the gatekeeper	
Kalka'il			Islam			Gatekeeper of the Fifth Heaven	
Kepharel			Judaism		Archangel		
Kerubiel	Cherubiel	'The Flames Which Dance Around the Throne of God'	Judaism	Cherubim		The principal regent who has reign over the Cherubim since Creation, and is one of the most exalted princes of Heaven	
Kokabiel	Kabaiel, Kakabel, Kochab, Kochbiel, Kokbiel, Kokhabiel	'Star of God'/God's Star, 'angel of the stars'	Judaism, Christianity		Watcher	Has reign over stars and constellations and is a teacher of astrology	
Kundaliel			Judaism, Christianity	Thrones	Archangel		
Kolazonta	Kolazanta	'The Punisher', 'The Chastiser'			Destroying Angel	Said to be a destroying angel who Aaron saw	
Kushiel		'Rigid One of God'	Judaism, Christianity	Angels		one of seven Angels of Punishment, punishes those in Hell	
Lailah	Laylah, Leliel	'Night'	Judaism			Angel of Night, Conception, and Pregnancy	
Laviah			Judaism (Kabbalah)	Cherubim	Kabbalistic angel	Opposes and rules over the demon Gusion	
Lecabel			Judaism (Kabbalah)	Dominions	Kabbalistic angel	Opposes and rules over the demon Foras	
Lehahiah			Judaism (Kabbalah)	Powers	Kabbalistic angel	Opposes and rules over the demon Furfur	
Levuiah			Judaism (Kabbalah)	Thrones	Kabbalistic angel	Opposes and rules over the demon Sallos	
Loviah			Judaism (Kabbalah)	Thrones	Kabbalistic angel	Opposes and rules over the demon Botis	
Lucifer	Helel (sometimes identified with Azazel, Samael, or Iblis), Yalal, Noctifer Satan (Judaism), Devil (Christianity)	'Dawn-Bringer', 'Day Star', 'The Morning Star', 'Venus', 'Light-Bringer', 'Shining One', 'He who Laments', 'He who despairs'	Judaism, Christianity	Cherubim	Destroying angel	Tester of the faithful (Judaism), personification of evil (Christianity, Islam)	
Machidiel	Malchedael, Malchidiel, Malahidael, Melkeial, Melkejal	'Help of God'/'Reward of God'/'Fullness of God'	Judaism, Christianity	Seraphim	Guardian Angel, Zodiac angel	Angel of the Month of March and the Zodiac of Aries; Represents the head of the human body	
Malik			Islam			Angel of Hellfire; the chief of the angels of hell	
Manadel			Judaism (Kabbalah)	Powers	Kabbalistic angel	Opposes and rules over the demon Stolas	
Manakel			Judaism (Kabbalah)	Angels	Kabbalistic angel	Opposes and rules over the demon Kimaris	
Macroprosopus	Makiel, Machiel, Machkiel	'God of concealed form'	Judaism, Christianity (Orthodox Christianity)	Dominions		Guardian angel of the Sixth Heaven	
Mahasiah			Judaism (Kabbalah)	Seraphim	Kabbalistic angel	Opposes and rules over the demon Marbas	
Malakbel		'Messenger/Angel of Bel'	Ancient Canaanite religion	Angels		Angel of the god Bel; god of the Sun	
Manda d-Hayyi	Yuzaṭaq	'Gnosis of Life', 'Knowledge of Life', 'Knower of the Life'	Gnosticism (Mandaeism)		Uthra	Messenger to John the Baptist, bringer of manda (knowledge or gnosis) to Earth	
Marfeil		'Healing'	Gnosticism (Mandaeism)		Uthra	Appointed by Yawar Ziwa over the east to watch over Ur	
Marut			Islam		Testing angel	Sent as a test to the people of Babylon to see if they start learning sorcery even if the angel clarified multiple times that it is here as a test and to not abandon their faith by listening to it, was paired with Harut.	
Mastema		'hatred', 'hostility', 'enmity', 'persecution'	Judaism, Christianity	Angels	Nephilim	Evil Angel of Disasters; chief of the Nephilim	
Matriel	Batariel	'Rain of God'	Ancient Canaanite religion, Judaism, Orthodox Christianity	Seraphim	Archangel	Angel of rain, bringer of rainstorms; Archangel of the overseers throne	
Mebahel			Judaism (Kabbalah)	Cherubim	Kabbalistic angel	Opposes and rules over the demon Leraie	
Mebahiah			Judaism (Kabbalah), Christianity	Principalities	Kabbalistic angel	Opposes and rules over the demon Orobas	
Mehiel			Judaism (Kabbalah)	Archangels	Kabbalistic angel	Opposes and rules over the demon Haures	
Melahel			Judaism (Kabbalah)	Thrones	Kabbalistic angel	Opposes and rules over the demon Aim	
Tawûsî Melek		'Peacock Angel'	Yazidism, Yarsanism		Archangel	Lord of this World and Leader of the Heptad	
Metatron	Mitatrush, Enoch (as human according to some)	'keeper of the watch', 'to guard and protect', 'one who serves behind the throne', 'one who occupies the throne next to the throne of glory'	Judaism, Christianity	Seraphim	Archangel	The Celestial Scribe; leader of the Seraphim	
Michael	Mikael (Hebrew), Mikhail (Arabic), Saint Michael the Archangel	"who is like God"	Judaism, Christianity, Islam, Yazdânism, Bahá’í Faith	Cherubim, one of the Seraph	Archangel	God's Right Hand; One of nine Angels of the end of Earth; Leader and General of The Heavenly Host (in Judaism and Christianity); Angel of Death (in Catholicism), Second Command of Military (in Islam), Angel of Mercy (in Islam)	
Mihael			Judaism (Kabbalah)	Virtues	Kabbalistic angel	Opposes and rules over the demon Haagenti	
Mikael	often associated with Michael		Judaism (Kabbalah)	Virtues	Kabbalistic angel	Opposes and rules over the demon Vepar	
Mitzrael			Judaism, Christianity	Thrones	Archangel of the coastal region	Internal reparation, security, intelligence	
Mizrael			Judaism (Kabbalah)	Archangels	Kabbalistic angel	Opposes and rules over the demon Vapula	
Moroni		'beloved, good, everything nice and desirable'	Latter Day Saint movement (Mormonism)			The Golden Plates, Herald of the Second Coming of Jesus Christ	
Mumiah			Judaism (Kabbalah)	Angels	Kabbalistic angel	Opposes and rules over the demon Andromalius	
Munkar		'The Denied'	Islam		Angel of Death	The Faith of the Dead	
Muriel		'Highness of God'	Christianity	Dominions	Guardian Angel, Zodiac angel	Angel of the Month of June and the Zodiac of Cancer; Represents the pectoral muscles and breasts of the human body; Administration, Patron of travellers	
Nakir		'The Denier'	Islam		Angel of Death	The Faith of the Dead	
Nanael			Judaism (Kabbalah), Christianity	Principalities	Kabbalistic angel	Opposes and rules over the demon Caim	
Nbat	Nbaṭ Rba, Nbaṭ Ziwa	'Sprout'	Gnosticism (Mandaeism)		Uthra	King of Air, first great Radiance	
Nelchael			Judaism (Kabbalah)	Thrones	Kabbalistic angel	Opposes and rules over the demon Morax	
Nemamiah			Judaism (Kabbalah)	Archangels	Kabbalistic angel	Opposes and rules over the demon Ose	
Netzach		'eminence', 'everlastingness', 'perpetuity'	Judaism, Christianity			Angel of Eternity; Leader of the Principalities along with Archangel Haniel	
Nidbai			Gnosticism (Mandaeism)		Uthra	Guardian spirit of the heavenly yardena (river) in the World of Light	
Nithael			Judaism (Kabbalah), Christianity	Principalities	Kabbalistic angel	Opposes and rules over the demon Murmur	
Nithhaiah			Judaism (Kabbalah)	Dominions	Kabbalistic angel	Opposes and rules over the demon Glasya-Labolas	
Nsab	Nṣab Rba, Nṣab Ziwa	'Plant'	Gnosticism (Mandaeism)		Uthra	Son of Yushamin; admonishes his father Yushamin over his rebellion	
Nuriel		'God is my fire'/'God is my light'	Judaism			Hailstorms	
Omael			Judaism (Kabbalah)	Dominions	Kabbalistic angel	Opposes and rules over the demon Forneus	
Ophaniel	Ofaniel		Judaism, Christianity	Cherubim; sometimes listed as one of the Thrones			
Oroiael			Gnosticism (Sethianism)		Luminary		
Pahaliah		'God's Redeemer'	Judaism (Kabbalah), Christianity	Thrones	Kabbalistic angel	Angel of theology, morals, virtuosity; Opposes and rules over the demon Purson	
Penemue		'The insider'	Judaism, Christianity		Watcher	One of the five Watcher satans	
Phanuel		'God has turned', 'The face of God'	Judaism, Christianity		Archangel	Repentance and hope	
Poiel	Poyel		Judaism (Kabbalah), Christianity	Principalities	Kabbalistic angel	Opposes and rules over the demon Gemory	
Poteh						Angel of Oblivion, Forgetfulness	
Pravuil	Vretil		Judaism		Archangel, recording angel	God's scribe and record-keeper	
Ptahil	The Fourth Life, Gabriel	'God opened'/'God created'	Gnosticism (Mandaeism)		Uthra	Creator of the material world	
Puriel	Pyriel, Puruel, Pusiel, Pyruel, Purel		Judaism			Examines the souls of those brought to heaven	
Radueriel			Judaism			Heavenly treasuries of the books	
Raguel	Akrasiel, Raguil, Rakul, Raquel, Rasuil, Reuel, Rufael	'God shall pasture'	Judaism, Christianity		Archangel	Angel of Justice; archangel of justice, fairness, harmony, vengeance, and redemption	
Ramiel	Remiel	'God has thundered'	Judaism, Christianity		Archangel, Watcher	Angel of divine visions and guiding of souls to heaven	
Raphael	Israfil (Arabic, often associated), Libiel	'God has healed'	Judaism, Christianity, Yazdânism	Seraphim	Archangel	One of nine Angels of the end of Earth; All manners of healing (Christianity); leader of the Virtues	
Raziel	Galizur	'God is my Mystery'	Judaism		Archangel	Keeper of Secrets, Mysteries, and Magic	
Rehael			Judaism (Kabbalah)	Powers	Kabbalistic angel	Opposes and rules over the demon Malphas	
Reiaiel			Judaism (Kabbalah)	Dominions	Kabbalistic angel	Opposes and rules over the demon Astaroth	
Rikbiel			Judaism, Christianity	Cherubim			
Rochel			Judaism (Kabbalah)	Angels	Kabbalistic angel	Opposes and rules over the demon Decarabia	
Sabriel			Judaism		Archangel	Miracles	
Sachiel	Sachquiel, Shatqiel, Shataqiel, Sachquiel, Sikhael, Saquiel, Satquiel, Satquel, Sixael		Judaism, Christianity	Cherubim	Archangel	Wealth and Charity	
Sahaquiel		'Ingenuity of God'/'God is Ingenuitous'	Judaism		Archangel	Guardian of the fourth heaven	
Sam Ziwa	Sam Mana Smira		Gnosticism (Mandaeism)		Uthra		
Samael	Smal, Smil, Samil, or Samiel Satan (Judaism), sometimes identified with Azazel or Lucifer	'Venom of God'/'God is Venomous', 'Severity of God'/'God is Severe'	Judaism, Christianity		Archangel, Angel of Death, Fallen Angel	Death and fetching souls; Punisher of sinners; The chief of all the destroying angels Head of satans	
Samyaza	Semyaza	'I have seen'/'HE has seen', 'Gazer from the heavens'	Judaism, Manichaeism		Watcher	Leader of the Watchers	
Sandalphon	Elijah (as human, according to some)	'Co-brother'	Judaism, Christianity		Archangel	Protector of unborn children (some sources: "twin brother" of Metatron)	
Sarathiel			Christianity		Archangel	Discipline and Penance	
Sariel	Sarakiel, Saraqael, Sauriel, Seriel, Souriel, Suriel, Suriyel, Suruel, Surufel sometimes identified with Samael and Azrael	'God is my Ruler'	Judaism, Gnosticism, Christianity		Archangel, Watcher (according to some)		
Satan	Lucifer (Christianity), (the) Devil (Christianity), Beelzebub sometimes identified as Samael (Judaism), Azazil/Iblis (Islam)	'accuser', 'adversary', 'to obstruct and object', 'prosecutor'	Judaism, Christianity, Latter Day Saint movement, Baháʼí Faith, Theistic Satanism		Fallen Angel, Archdemon	Enemy of God, lies, temptation, the Dragon, the ruler of demons (Christianity), Symbol of the lower nature of men (Baháʼí Faith)	
Sathariel		'Moon of God', 'Dawn of God'	Judaism, Christianity		Watcher		
Saureil	Ṣaureil Qmamir Ziwa		Gnosticism (Mandaeism)		Uthra	Angel of Death	
Sealiah			Judaism (Kabbalah)	Virtues	Kabbalistic angel	Opposes and rules over the demon Vine	
Seehiah			Judaism (Kabbalah)	Dominions	Kabbalistic angel	Opposes and rules over the demon Berith	
Selaphiel	Sealtiel, Selatiel	'I have asked God'	Christianity		Archangel	Patron saint of prayer and worship	
Seraphiel		'Seraph of God/El'	Judaism, Christianity	Seraphim		Angel of Silence; Chief of seraphim; Protector of Metatron	
Shamnail			Yazdânism		Archangel		
Shamsiel	Samsapeel, Shamshel, Shamshiel, Shashiel	'Sun of God'/'God is my Sun'	Judaism, Christianity		Watcher	Ruler of the Fourth Heaven	
Sheetil			Gnosticism (Mandaeism)		Uthra	Teacher of John the Baptist, revealer of Gnosticism (Mandaeism)	
Shihlun			Gnosticism (Mandaeism)		Uthra	Opposition to the creation of the material world by Ptahil and his assistant uthras	
Shilmai			Gnosticism (Mandaeism)		Uthra	Guardian spirit of the heavenly river Piriawis in the World of Light	
Simat Hayyi		'Treasure of Life'	Gnosticism (Mandaeism)		Uthra	Wife of Yawar Ziwa	
Sitael			Judaism (Kabbalah)	Seraphim	Kabbalistic angel	Opposes and rules over the demon Vassago	
Tamiel	Kasdaye, Kasdeja, Kasyade	'God is Perfect'/'Perfection of God'	Judaism, Christianity		Watcher, Fallen angel	One of the five Watcher satans	
Tarwan	Tarwan-Nhura		Gnosticism (Mandaeism)		Uthra		
Temeluchus	Temelouchus, Temlakos	'care-taking one'	Christianity			Care-taking of dead children killed by their parents	
Turail			Yazdânism		Archangel		
Turiel		'Rock of God'/'God is a rock', 'Mountain of God'/'God is a mountain'	Judaism, Christianity		Watcher		
Umabel			Judaism (Kabbalah)	Archangels	Kabbalistic angel	Opposes and rules over the demon Zagan	
Urfeil			Gnosticism (Mandaeism)		Uthra	Appointed by Yawar Ziwa over the east to watch over Ur	
Uriel		'Flaming Light of God'/'El is my flaming light'	Judaism, Christianity	Seraphim	Archangel	One of nine Angels of the end of Earth; Patron of the Arts	
Uziel			Judaism		Archangel		
Vasariah			Judaism (Kabbalah)	Dominions	Kabbalistic angel	Opposes and rules over the demon Asmoday	
Vasiariah			Judaism, Christianity	Dominions			
Vehuel			Judaism (Kabbalah), Christianity	Principalities	Kabbalistic angel	Opposes and rules over the demon Crocell	
Vehuiah			Judaism (Kabbalah)	Seraphim	Kabbalistic angel	Opposes and rules over the demon Bael	
Verchiel		'Power of God'/'God is my power'/'God is powerful', 'Benediction of God'	Judaism, Christianity	Powers	Archangel, Zodiac angel	Angel of the Month of July and the Zodiac of Leo; Represents the heart of the human body; Archangel of pride, grace and beauty; Leader of Principalities	
Veualiah			Judaism (Kabbalah)	Virtues	Kabbalistic angel	Opposes and rules over the demon Sabnock	
Wormwood		'Bitter Star'	Christianity			War	
Yadathan			Gnosticism (Mandaeism)		Uthra	Guardian of the "first river", stands at the Gate of Life	
Yarhibol		'The Moon of Bel'	Ancient Canaanite religion	Angels		'Lord of the Springs; Angel of the god Baal Hadad	
Yawar Ziwa	Yawar Kasia, Yawar Rabba	'Dazzling radiance'	Gnosticism (Mandaeism)		Uthra	Personification of light	
Yomiel	Jomjael, Yomyael	'Day of God'	Judaism, Christianity		Watcher		
Yufin-Yufafin			Gnosticism (Mandaeism)		Uthra		
Yukabar	Yukabar-Kušṭa, Yukabar-Ziwa		Gnosticism (Mandaeism)		Uthra	Helps Nbaṭ fight a rebellion against Yushamin	
Yukašar	Yukašar-Kana	'Source of Radiance'	Gnosticism (Mandaeism)		Uthra	Portrayed as the son of Ptahil	
Yurba	Shamish, Adonai, Yorabba		Gnosticism (Mandaeism)		Uthra	The fighter; often mentioned as engaging in conversation with Ruha	
Yushamin	The Second Life		Gnosticism (Mandaeism)		Uthra	Primal uthra	
Zachariel	Zahariel, Zerachiel, sometimes identified as Saraqael	'God has remembered'	Christianity		Archangel	Archangel who leads souls to judgement	
Zadkiel	Hesediel, Tzadkiel, Zadakiel, Zadchial, Zedekiel, Zedekul	'Righteousness of God'/'God is my Righteousness'	Judaism, Christianity		Archangel	Archangel of freedom, benevolence, mercy, and the Patron Angel of all who forgive; leader of the Dominions	
Zagagel	Zathael, Nathanel, Akatriel	'Crown of God'	Judaism, Christianity, Yazdânism		Archangel	archangel of messenger, protection, guardians, and the patron Angel of valor and bravery; eastern leader of the Dominions	
Zaphkiel	Tzaphkiel, Tzaphqiel, Zaphchial, Zaphiel, Zelel, Zadkiel (sometimes)	'Knowledge of God/'God's knowledge'	Judaism, Christianity		Archangel	leader of the Thrones	
Zaqiel	Zavebe	'Hidden by God'/'God has hidden', 'Protected by God'/'God has protected', 'Favored by El'/'El has favored'	Judaism, Christianity		Watcher		
Zebuleon			Judaism, Christianity		Archangel	One of nine Angels of the end of Earth	
Zephaniel			Judaism		Archangel	Chief of the Ishim	
Zephon			Judaism			Tiphereth	
Zihrun	Zihrun-Uthra, Yusmir-Kana, Zihrun-Šašlamiel	'HE warned me', 'secured'	Gnosticism (Mandaeism)		Uthra	Uthra of radiance, light, and glory	
Zotiel		'Little one of God'	Judaism			One of the 'princes of paradise'	
Zuriel		'Strength of God'	Judaism, Christianity	Principalities	Archangel, Zodiac angel	Angel of the Month of September and the Zodiac of Libra; Represents the kidneys of the human body; Guardian angel of the forest and nature; leader of the Virtues	

== See also ==
- Angels in art
- Fallen angel
- Guardian angel
- Gustav Davidson – author of A Dictionary of Angels
- Heavenly host
- Hierarchy of angels
- Ishim
- List of angels in fiction
- List of theological demons
- Seven Archangels
