= Yahoel =

Angel in Judaism

Yahoel (Church Slavonic: Иаоилъ, reconstructed Greek: Ιαοὴλ, reconstructed Hebrew: יהואל or יואל; also spelled Jahoel, Jehoel, Iaoel, etc. in English and Yaoel in French) is the name of an angel appearing in the Old Church Slavonic manuscripts of the Apocalypse of Abraham, a pseudepigraphical work dating from after the siege of Jerusalem (70). The name is thought to be a compound of the Tetragrammaton and ʔēl, the Hebrew word for 'God'. He is an associate of Michael (Apoc. Abr.10:17) charged to restrain Leviathan and destroy idolaters (10:10–14).

Yahoel is presented as an exalted angel who bears the Divine Name within himself, acting as a second power and mediator between the transcendent God and human medium Abraham.

Another later pseudepigraphical rabbinical work ascribed to Ishmael ben Elisha, Hebrew 3 Enoch 48d, gives Yahoel as one of the 70 names of Metatron, which makes sense in light of the character and role of Yahoel in the Apocalypse of Abraham.

In the medieval 13th century, kabbalistic Berith Menucha of Abraham Merimon of Granada Yahoel is the angel of fire.

Several popular dictionaries of angels, such as Gustav Davidson's A dictionary of angels: including the fallen angels (1967) repeat the claim that Jehoel was (in unidentified Jewish texts) the chief angel of the Seraphim. No source for this claim is forthcoming.

In the autobiography of Avvakum, the angel’s name was corrupted in the passage иди Иоаль тьзе посредьства имени («go, Yahoel, (God’s) namesake by your name»), so the angel’s name became Альтезъ (Altez).

== See also ==
- Angels in Judaism
- Archangel Michael
- List of angels in theology
- Melchizedek
