= Asbeel =

Fallen angel in the book of Enoch

Asbeel (Heb. עזב azab "to abandon" + אל el "God", meaning "the deserter from God" or "God has forsaken") is a fallen angel that appears in the first book of Enoch, chapter 69, verse 5:

"And the second is called Asbeêl : he imparted to the children of the holy angels the evil counsel and led them astray so that they defiled their bodies with the daughters of men."

Asbeel was listed as the second of five chief angels or "satans" who led astray the Grigori by falling in love with humans. There were also Yeqon (or Yaqum, "he shall rise"), Gadreel ("wall of God"), Penemue ("the inside"), and Kasdaye ("Chaldean", "covered hand").

He is also referred to in the film The Devil Inside, as a possessed woman shouts that she is 'Asbeel'.

== See also ==
- List of angels in theology
- Kasbeel
