= Sachiel =

Archangel

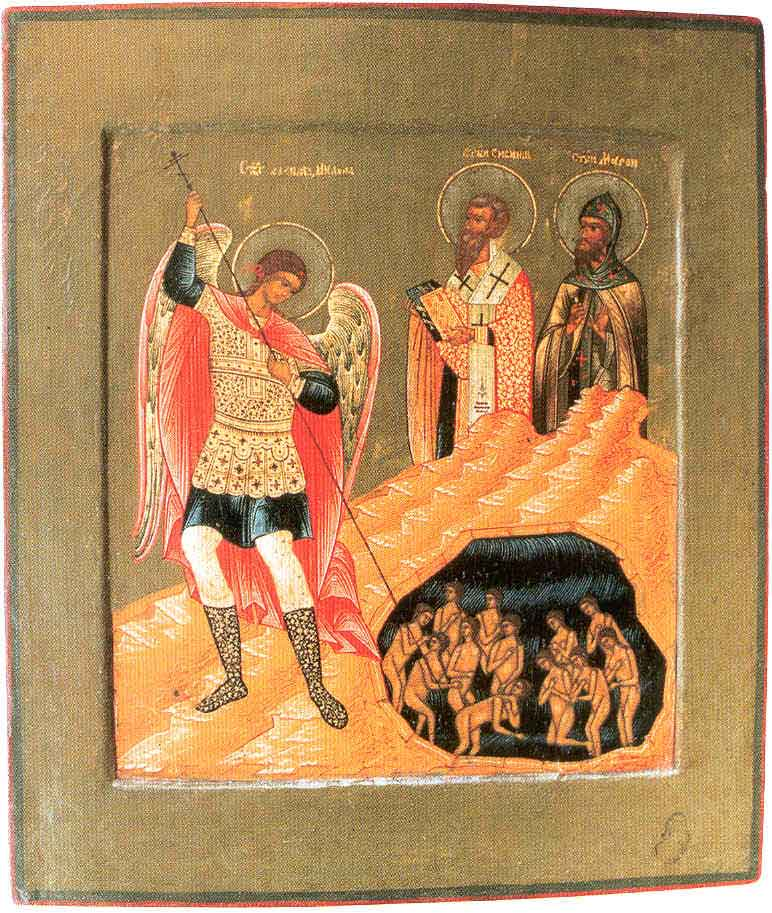

In kabbalistic and Christian angelology, Sachiel (Ge'ez ሳቁኤል) is an archangel of the order of cherubim. The name 'Sachiel' originally occurs in the late 1500s grimoire called The Heptameron. He is the archangel of wealth, abundance, success and prosperity.

== Name ==
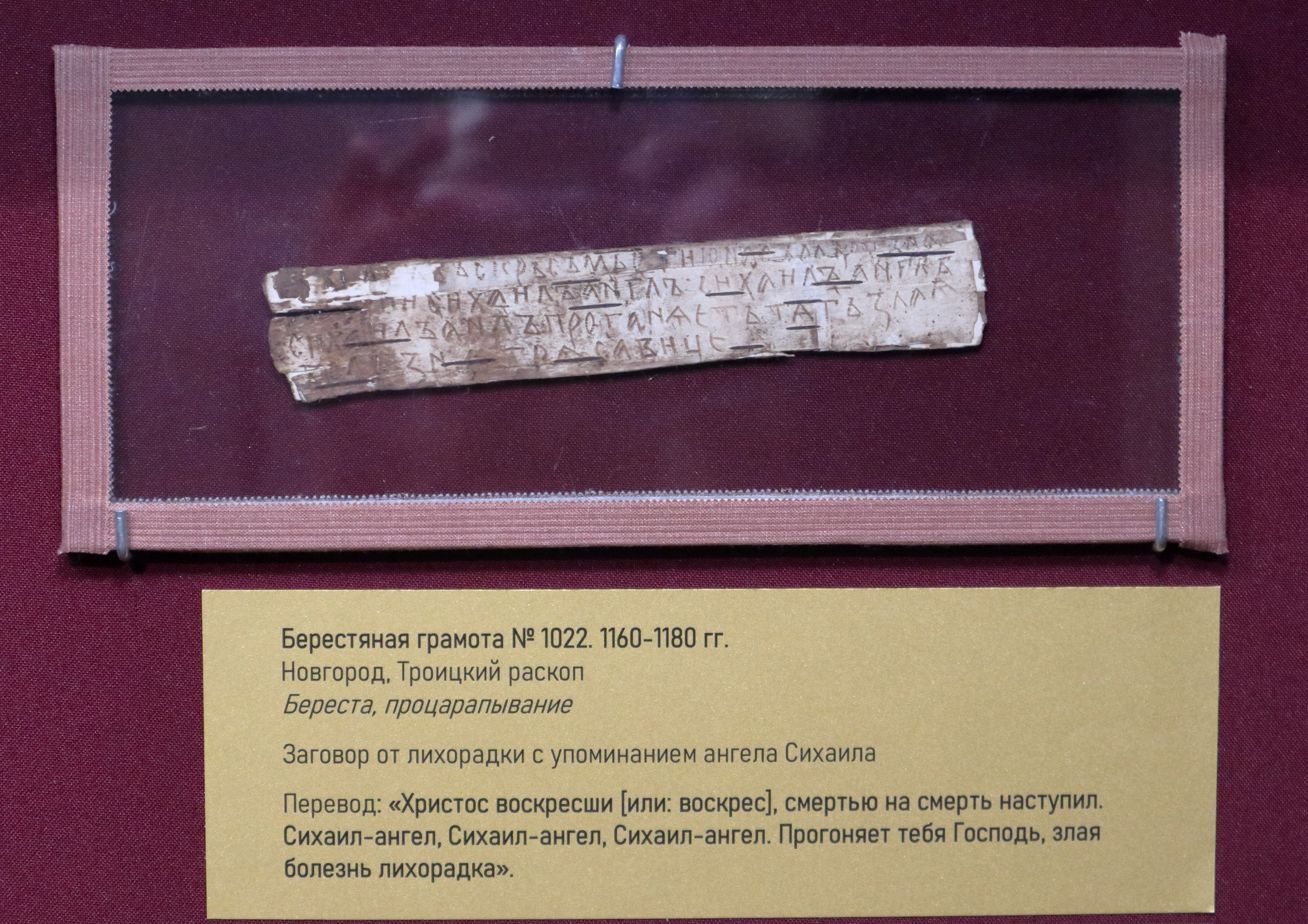
Birch bark No 1022 from Novgorod (1160‒1180 years): '...Angel Sikhael, angel Sikhael, angel Sikhael. The Lord chases you away, evil disease, fever!"

In the early mentions of that angel, its name is spelled in various ways:

Two mid-12th century birch bark manuscripts were found apparently containing the archangel's name, spelled as 'сихаїлъ' or 'сихаилъ' (Sikhael/Sixael), repeated thrice to serve as talismans against disease.

In the late-1200s grimoire The Oathbound Book of Honorius, its name is spelled 'Satquiel'. That spelling was taken from the early-1200s Jewish occult book Sefer Raziel HaMalakh ("book of Raziel the angel"). The Sefer Raziel is highly inconsistent in its spelling of the angel's name, which is therein spelled twice as 'Satquel', three times as 'Satquiel', twice as 'Saquiel', and once as 'Sachquiel'. It is that last spelling from which derives the later spelling 'Sachiel' from The Heptameron. The wide variation of spellings of the name in the Sefer Raziel is in large part the result of the fact that the author created the angel by conflating together two different angels from the 400s CE Jewish book 3 Enoch. The Sefer Raziel spellings 'Satquel' and 'Satquiel' are derived from the 3 Enoch angel Zadkiel, which is also spelled 'Shatqiel' and 'Shataqiel'. The Sefer Raziel spelling 'Sachquiel' is derived from the 3 Enoch angel Sahaquiel, which is also spelled 'Shachaqiel' and 'Shahaqiel'. Those 2 angels were first discussed in 3 Enoch.

== Associations ==
Sachiel is associated with the weekday Thursday, wealth, and charity. While in most sources Sachiel presides over Thursday, others do assign him to Monday or Friday. All associate him with the planet Jupiter; as such, in New Age angel lore he can be invoked for matters involving money, finance, law, politics, and religion. His sigil appears in Francis Barrett's The Magus, an early nineteenth century compendium of occult lore. It also appears in the 16th century treatise, The Complete Book of Magic Science.

== See also ==
- List of angels in theology
