= Cassiel =

Angel in extracanonical religious texts

Cassiel (Hebrew: קַצְפִּיאֵל Qaṣpīʾēl, "God is my wrath")—also known as Kassiel, Qassiel, and other phonetic variations—is an angel appearing in extracanonical Jewish, Christian, and Islamic mystical and magical works, often as one of the Seven Archangels, the angel of Saturn, and in other roles.

He is also known as Caftsiel and Captsiel (Hebrew: קַפְצִיאֵל Qap̄ṣīʾēl, "God is my leap"; Arabic: كسفيائيل, Kasfīyāʾīl), among other phonetic translations and variations.

== In Jewish mystical literature ==
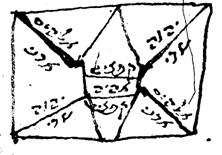
Qafsiel amulet from the 15th century

Cassiel is invoked in an ancient Hebrew charm to tell if an enemy is running away. Gustav Davidson writes that Cassiel is described as the ruler of the seventh heaven in 3 Enoch, citing Odeberg's edition.

However, Odeberg's edition only states in a footnote that Cassiel is "(one of) the guardian(s) of the door of the seventh Hall" in Hekhalot Rabbati. In turn, Cassiel is described in Hekhalot Rabbati as a guardian of the sixth palace, armed with a lightning-dripping sword (which shouts "Ruin!") as well as a bow, tempests, light, and powerful winds—weapons which he uses against anyone not fit to see God. Cassiel is later described in the same work as one of three "guardians of the entrance of the seventh palace," alongside Dumiel and Gabriel.

Cassiel is also listed in Ma'aseh Merkavah as a guardian of the second palace. Sefer Raziel lists Cassiel as the prince of Saturn. The Zohar describes Cassiel as one of the two chief aides (alongside Hizqiel) to Gabriel. Cassiel is also described as one of the angels of death in Judaism—specifically as the angel who presides over the deaths of young men.

== In Western occult literature ==
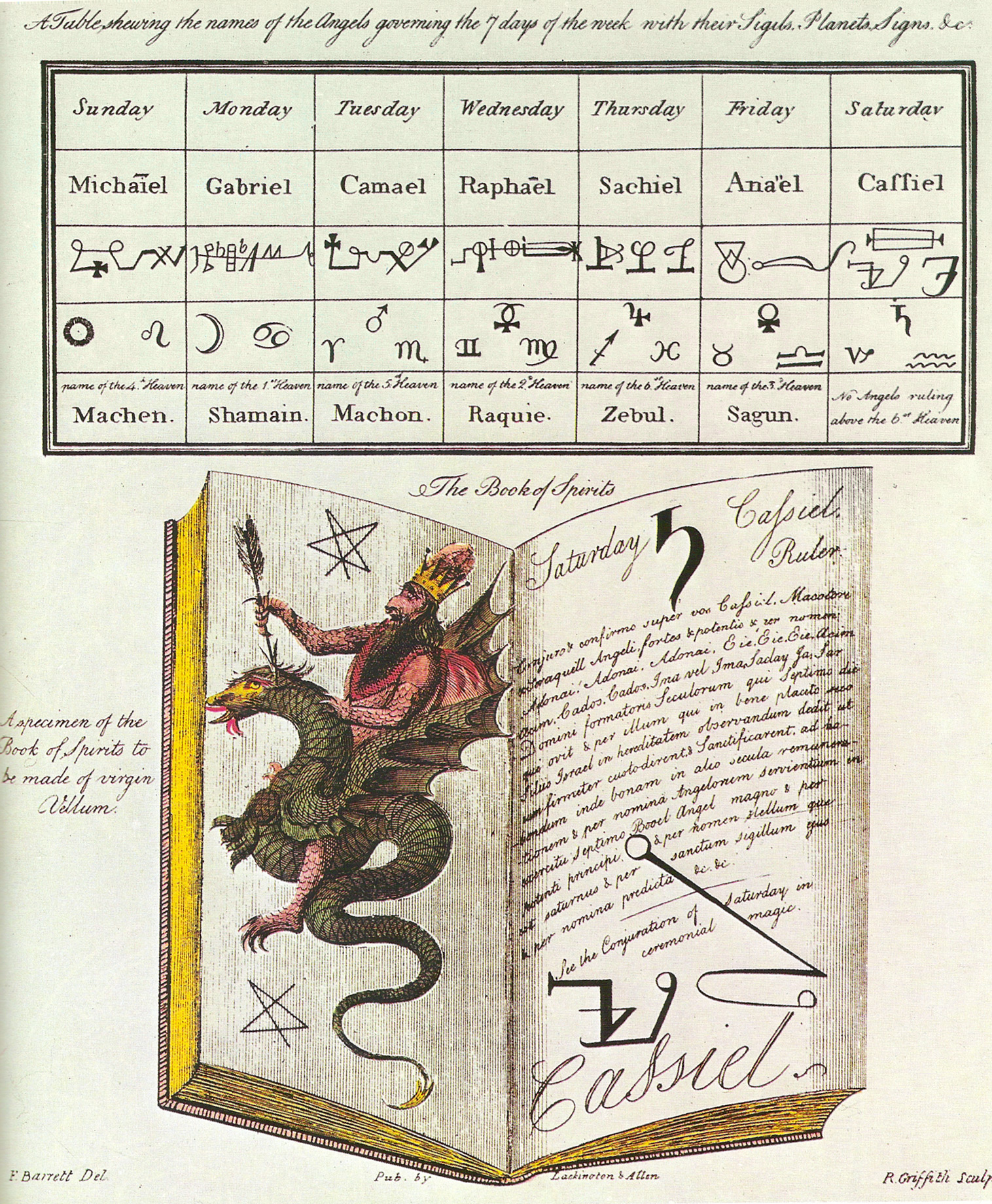
Illustration of Cassiel from The Magus by Francis Barrett (1801)

Cassiel is listed in the related works The Sworn Book of Honorius and in (pseudo)-Pietro d'Abano's Heptameron (the latter also being influenced by Sefer Raziel).

Cassiel's presence in Honorius may also be a result of Greek influence, as he is likewise listed in a Byzantine exorcism manual (albeit as Kasiel). In those works, he is referred to as the angel of Saturn, the angel of the North, and as one of the angels mentioned in the Sigillum Dei.

Following Honorius and the Heptameron, Cassiel appears in the Liber de Angelis as Cassael (again the angel over Saturn), and, in various editions of the Key of Solomon, as Cassiel or Cassael (the angel—sometimes archangel—of Saturn or Saturday), and again in the Sigillum Dei. Cassiel is depicted in Francis Barrett's The Magus as a dragon-riding djinn with a beard—again as the angel of Saturn.

== Other works ==
Cassiel is sometimes described as the angel of tears and the angel of temperance. As Qafsiel, he is sometimes regarded as the ruler of the moon instead of Saturn.

Averroes and Ibn Arabi likewise listed Saturn as the planetary counterpart of the archangel Kafziel. Ahmad al-Buni listed Kasfiyail as one of eight angels, among whom each has its own hierarchy of spirits under command.

== In popular culture ==
- Cassiel is the main protagonist in The Outcast Season series by Rachel Caine.
- Cassiel appears in Wim Wenders's film Wings of Desire, as well as the U.S. remake, City of Angels. Wenders found the name in an encyclopedia about angels. Cassiel, played by Otto Sander in the original and Andre Braugher in the remake, watches with considerable ambivalence as his friend becomes human. In the sequel Faraway, So Close!, Cassiel himself becomes human. Nick Cave wrote "Cassiel's Song" as part of the music for that film.
- Cassiel, in an alternate form, appears as one of several angels who followed the fictional son of Jesus as he travelled the world preaching the tenet "Love as thou wilt", in Jacqueline Carey's Terre D'Ange novels.

== See also ==
- List of angels in theology
- Zaphkiel
