= Zaphkiel =

Archangel in Abrahamic religion

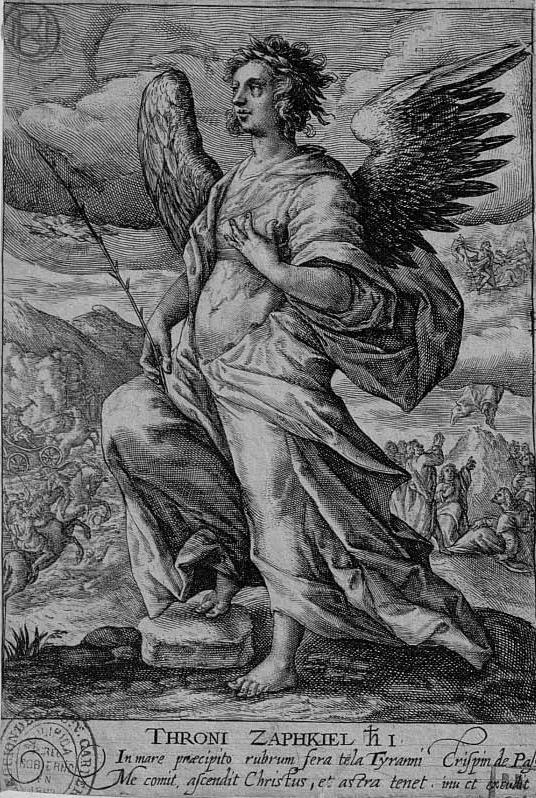
The Throne Zaphkiel, engraving by Crispijn van de Passe, circa 1575. Biblioteca Nacional de España, Madrid.

Zaphkiel (Hebrew: צַפְקִיאֵל Ṣafqīʾēl), also written as Tzaphqiel, Tzaphkiel, Zaphchial, Zaphiel, or Zelel, is an archangel. He is sometimes equated with Zadkiel, but other times, considered to be a different angel. Zaphkiel is "chief of the Ophanim (order of thrones) and one of the 9 angels that rule Heaven; also one of the 7 archangels." He can watch people when they need to make important decisions and when they need to put them into words for others. If they are unsure of the words, he will help them to make the message more clear. The leader of the Erelim, he is associated with the planet Saturn. It is associated also with the sephira Binah. Because of his association with Saturn, he is occasionally associated with Cassiel.

== In fiction ==
Zaphkiel has been adapted for several pieces of modern fiction:

- Zaphkiel is an Archon of the Order of Thrones in Wizards of the Coast's roleplaying game Dungeons & Dragons.
- In the Japanese light novel series Date A Live, "Zafkiel" is the name of a spiritual weapon (referred to as Angels within the series), belonging to Kurumi Tokisaki. Zafkiel takes on the form of a large clock. It has various powers related to manipulating time, including reversing one's or another's condition, sending one's consciousness to their past self, and peeking into the past of any object shot.

== See also ==
- Raphael
- List of angels in theology
