= Jophiel =

Angel (Judaism; Christianity)

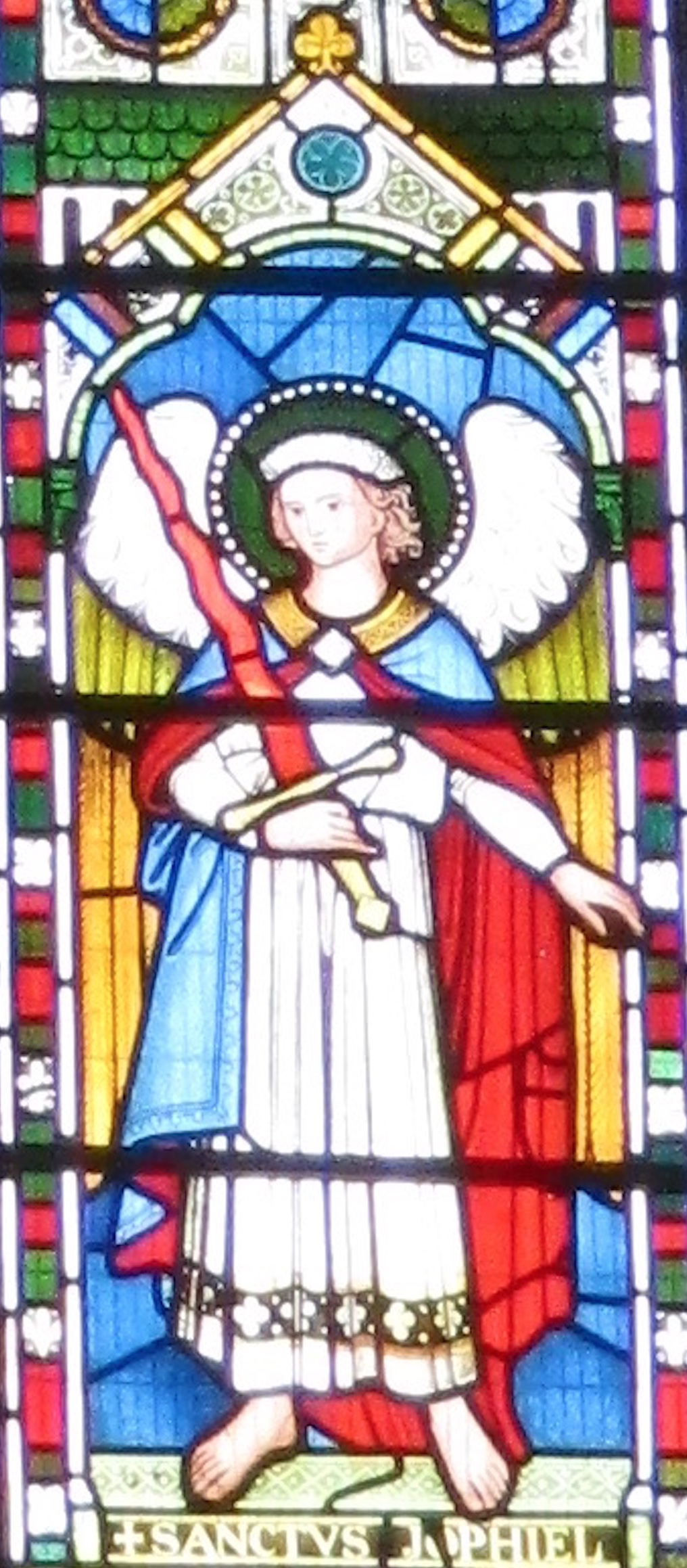
- Sanctus Jophiel, stained-glass window at St Michael's Church, Brighton, England.

Archangel
- Venerated in: Judaism, Anglicanism
- Feast: 29 September
- Attributes: Flaming sword
- Patronage: Art, artists

The angel Jophiel (Heb. יוֹפִיאֵל Yōp̄īʾēl, "Beauty of God"), also called Iophiel, Iofiel, Jofiel, Yofiel, Youfiel, Zophiel (צֹפִיאֵל Ṣōp̄īʾēl, "God is my watchman") and Zuriel (צוּרִיאֵל Ṣūrīʾēl, "God is my rock"), is an archangel in Christian and Jewish angelology. Jophiel is the archangel of beauty, art, craftsmanship and wisdom.

== Beliefs in religions and ceremonial magic ==
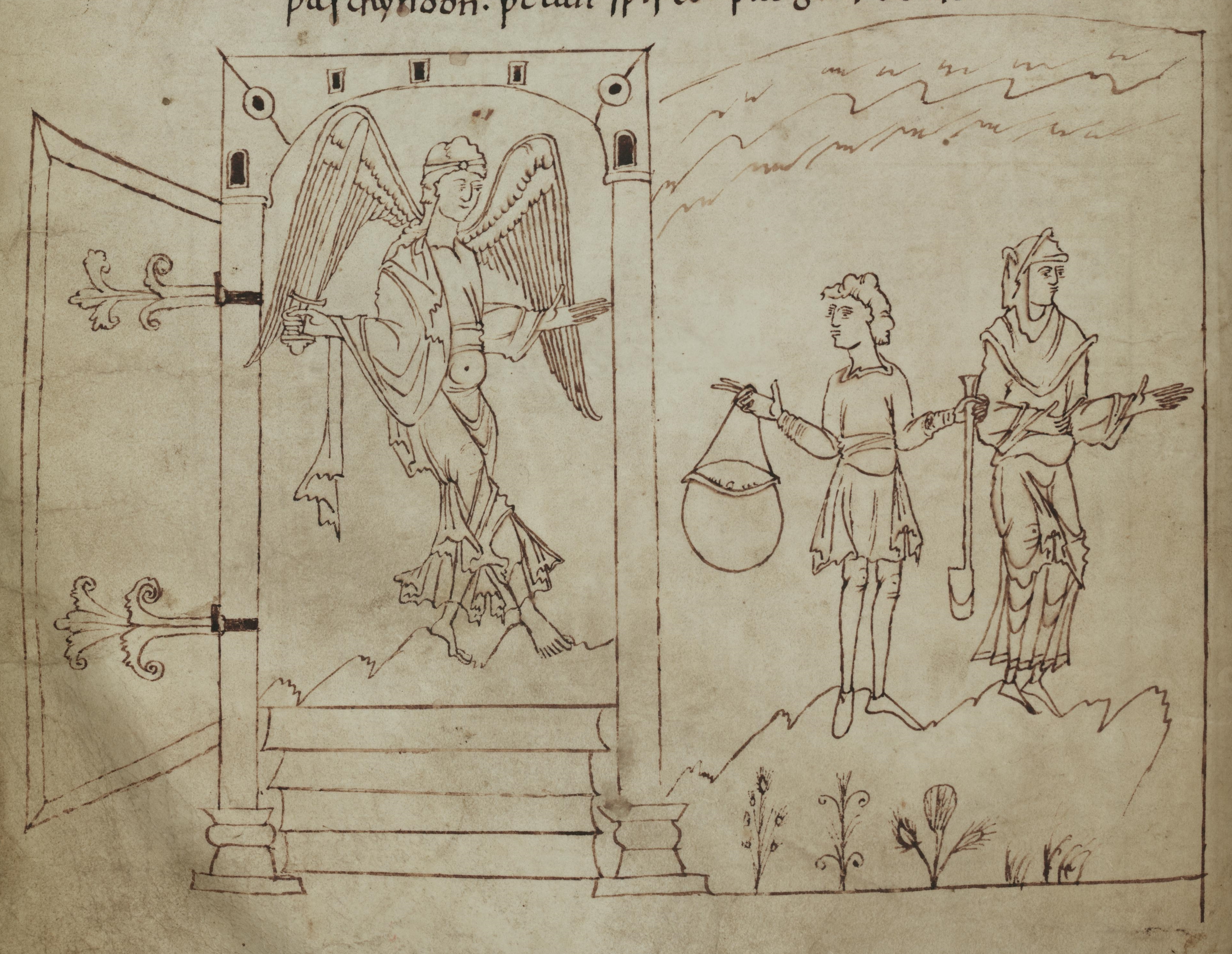
According to Robert Means Lawrence, Arthur de Bles, and R.L. Giles, Jophiel was said to be the Angel who cast Adam and Eve out of Paradise

According to the pseudepigraphal Revelation of Moses, another name for Jophiel is Dina (Hebrew: דִּינָה Dīnā, "Judgement"). In the text, Jophiel/Dina is described as an angel of the seventh heaven, a guardian of the Torah (and wisdom itself), who taught 70 languages to souls at the dawn of creation. The Zohar, one thousand years later, lists Jophiel as a Great Angel Chief in charge of 53 legions who superintend Torah-readings on the Sabbath. Jophiel is said to be a companion to the angel Metatron.

C. E. Clement, in her book Angels in Art, names Jophiel as the teacher of Ham, Japheth, and Shem. Heinrich Cornelius Agrippa and Thomas Rudd likewise name Jophiel as the teacher of Shem.

In the Anglican tradition, Jophiel is recognized as an archangel. Jophiel is often depicted in iconography holding a flaming sword, (Note: The flaming sword is also generally an attribute of the archangel Uriel, but he is more often depicted in Anglican iconography holding a book (scroll) or a solar disc.) such as the stained glasses at St Michael's Church in Brighton, St Peter and St John's Church in Kirkley, Holy Trinity Church in Coventry, and a mural at St. John's Episcopal Church in Memphis, Tennessee.

Jophiel is an Archangel of the Kabbalah (although some systems put Raziel in Jophiel’s place) and in several listings, including that of the early medieval theologian Pseudo-Dionysus. The Calendarium Naturale Magicum Perpetuum lists Jophiel as the angel of the Sephira Binah, as do the Key of Solomon variant "The Veritable Clavicles of Solomon," and the Sixth and Seventh Books of Moses, both latter works derived from the Calendarium. Agrippa attributes Jophiel to Saturn, while Paracelsus assigns Jophiel to Jupiter. Rudd attributes the Zodiac to Jophiel along with the Sephira Binah instead of Zaphkiel. Athanasius Kircher names Jophiel as Angelus pulchritudinis, "angel of beauty". According to Robert Ambelain, Jophiel is in charge of the Cherubim, particularly the Shemhamphorasch angels Haziel, Aladiah, Lauviah, Hahaiah, Iezalel, Mehahel, Hariel, and Hakamiah.

In John Milton's epic poem, Paradise Lost, the Archangel Jophiel is depicted as the "cherubim with the swiftest wings."

== See also ==
- List of angels in theology
- Yufin-Yufafin in Mandaeism
