= Nelchael =

Angel in occultism

Gustav Davidson writes in A Dictionary of Angels that Nelchael is "an angel belonging to the order of thrones and one of the 72 angels who bear the mystical name of God Shemhamphorae, according to Barrett, The Magus, and Ambelain, La Kabbale Practicque. However, according to Hermetic Angelology Nelchael is a fallen one who, in Hell, teaches astronomy, mathematics, and geography to his demons." In the Kabbalah, Nelchael comprises the Shem HaMephorash and as such cannot be considered fallen.
