= Angel of the Presence =

Angelic entity in some Christian traditions

In some Christian traditions, the Angel of the Presence / Face (lit. "faces", Hebrew: Mal'akh HaPanim, מלאך הפנים) or Angel of his presence / face (Hebrew: Mal'akh Panav, מַלְאַךְ פָּנָיו) refers to an entity variously considered angelic or else identified with God himself.

The phrase occurs in the Book of Isaiah (Isaiah 63:9), which states that, throughout the history of the Israelites, God has loved and been merciful to that nation and shared in its distresses, saving Israel with "the angel of his presence". The Septuagint translation of the Book of Isaiah explains the term in the most explicit language as a reference to God: "not an ambassador, nor an angel, but the Lord Himself (Greek: αὐτὸς κύριος) saved them".

In the Book of Jubilees, the Angel of the Presence explains to Moses the history of Israel. Jubilees depicts this entity as one of God's special agents and does not provide him with a specific name. In the Testament of Judah, Judah states that he has received blessing from the Angel of the Presence.

In the book of Enoch, four angels that stand before the Lord of Spirits are given as: Michael, Raphael, Gabriel, and Phanuel. According to some scholars, the Second Book of Enoch identifies Uriel, known in various traditions under the names of Phanuel or Sariel, as the Angel of the Presence or else as one of the Angels of the Presence.

== Bible ==
A related term is "angel of his Presence" used just once, in Isaiah 63:9. There it says that throughout the history of Israel, God has loved and been merciful to that nation and shared in its distresses, saving Israel with "the angel of his presence".

Isaiah 63:9 In all their affliction he was afflicted, and the angel of his presence (מַלְאַךְ פָּנָיו) saved them:

Some theologians believe that the Septuagint translation (ἄγγελος ἀλλ᾽ αὐτὸς κύριος) demonstrates that "angel of his presence" is simply a way of referring to God, not a regular or created angel. "Not an elder or an angel, but the Lord Himself saved them..." is a current Septuagint translation.

== Second Temple period ==
In the second century BC Book of Tobit, which is regarded as canonical by Catholics and Orthodox Christians, Raphael is described as one of the seven angels who see God's glory: "I am Raphael, one of the seven angels who stand ready and enter before the glory of the Lord." In the Pseudepigrapha, in the Book of Jubilees, the Angel of the Presence explains to Moses the history of Israel. Jubilees depicts this entity as one of God's special agents and does not provide him with a specific name. In the Testament of Judah, Judah states that he has received blessing from the Angel of the Presence. The Second Book of Enoch identifies Uriel as the Angel of the Presence or else as one of the Angels of the Presence.

In the Book of Jubilees, angels of the presence and angels of Sanctification are the two highest orders of angels. They were created on the first day, so that they could participate in the keeping of the Sabbath with God in heaven and on earth. God instructed one of these angels (thought to be St. Michael), to write the history of creation for Moses. The angel took the tablets of history and law, and in a long revelation, recited them to Moses with instructions to write them down. In the Testaments of the Twelve Patriarchs, Judah, one of the 12 sons of Jacob and Leah, testifies that he was blessed by an angel of the presence.

== New Testament ==
In the first chapter of the Gospel of Luke, the priest Zechariah is visited by an angel. After Zechariah receives a prophecy about the birth of his son, John the Baptist, the angel identifies himself: "I am Gabriel. I stand in the presence of God. . . ." Commentators have interpreted this statement to imply high rank. For example, Matthew Henry writes "He is Gabriel, who stands in the presence of God, an immediate attendant upon the throne of God. The prime ministers of state in the Persian court are described by this, that they saw the king's face". Gabriel is not called an archangel in the Bible, but is so identified in Intertestamental period sources like the Book of Enoch.

== See also ==
- Angel of the Lord
- Divine presence
- List of angels in theology
- Metatron and Sandalphon (who bear either side of the Ark of the Covenant and stand intermediary between God and humanity)
- Shekhinah
