= Yesod =

Ninth emanation in Kabbalah

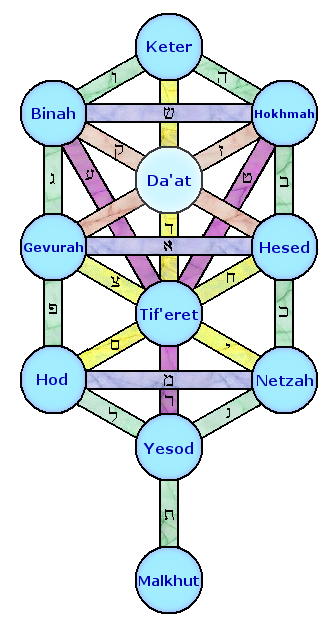
The Sefirot in Kabbalah
The Sefiroth in Jewish Kabbalah
View the image description page for this diagram	The Tree of Life

Yesod (Hebrew: יְסוֹד Yəsōḏ, Tiberian: Yăsōḏ, "foundation") is a sephirah or node in the kabbalistic Tree of Life, a system of Jewish philosophy. Yesod, located near the base of the Tree, is the sephirah below Hod and Netzach, and above Malkuth (the kingdom). It is seen as a vehicle allowing movement from one thing or condition to another (the power of connection). Yesod, Kabbalah, and the Tree of Life are Jewish concepts adopted by various philosophical systems including Christianity, New Age Eastern-based mysticism, and Western esoteric practices.

== Jewish Kabbalah ==
According to Jewish Kabbalah, Yesod is the foundation upon which God has built the world. It also serves as a transmitter between the sephirot above, and the reality below. The light of the upper sephirot gather in Yesod and are channelled to Malkuth below. In this manner, Yesod is associated with the sexual organs. The masculine Yesod collects the vital forces of the sephirot above, and transmits these creative and vital energies into the feminine Malkuth below. Yesod channels, Malkuth receives. In turn, it is through Malkuth that the earth is able to interact with the divinity.

Yesod plays the role of collecting and balancing the different and opposing energies of Hod and Netzach, and also from Tiferet above it, storing and distributing it throughout the world. It is likened to the 'engine-room' of creation. The Cherubim is the angelic choir connected to Yesod, headed by the Archangel Gabriel. In contrast, the demonic order in the qlippothic sphere opposite of Yesod is Gamaliel.

== Other systems ==
=== Esotericism ===
In Western esotericism, according to the writer Dion Fortune, Yesod is considered to be "of supreme importance to the practical occultist...the Treasure House of Images, the sphere of Maya, Illusion." Prominent occultist Aleister Crowley associated Yesod with Ganesha.
