= Pahaliah =

Kabbalistic Angel

Pahaliah is the guardian angel of redemption (name meaning God Redeemer) and is invoked to give revelations of truth and wisdom. He is a member of the Order of Thrones and an angel of Virtuosity. He rules theology and morals, granting wisdom, determination and knowledge, and is one of the angels bearing the mystical name of God, Shemhamphorae (Heb. שם המפורש Shem ha-mephorash — "the Ineffable Name", i.e. the Tetragrammaton).

== See also ==
- List of angels in theology
