= Abraham ben Isaac =

Abraham ben Isaac or Avraham Ben Yitzhak (Hebrew: אברהם בן יצחק) may refer to:

- Abraham ben Isaac Bedersi (13th century), Provençal Jewish poet
- Abraham ben Isaac of Granada (13th century), kabbalist
- Abraham ben Isaac of Narbonne (c. 1110 – 1158), Provençal rabbi
- Avraham Ben-Yitzhak (1883–1950), Israeli Hebrew poet
