= Zephaniel =

The Masseket Azilut describes the sixth (of ten) rank of angels as the Ishim, and names the archangel 'Zephaniel' as their chief. The Ishim are man-like beings which are often used to communicate with people.

== See also ==
- List of angels in theology
