= Recording angel =

Angel who records a person's life and prayers

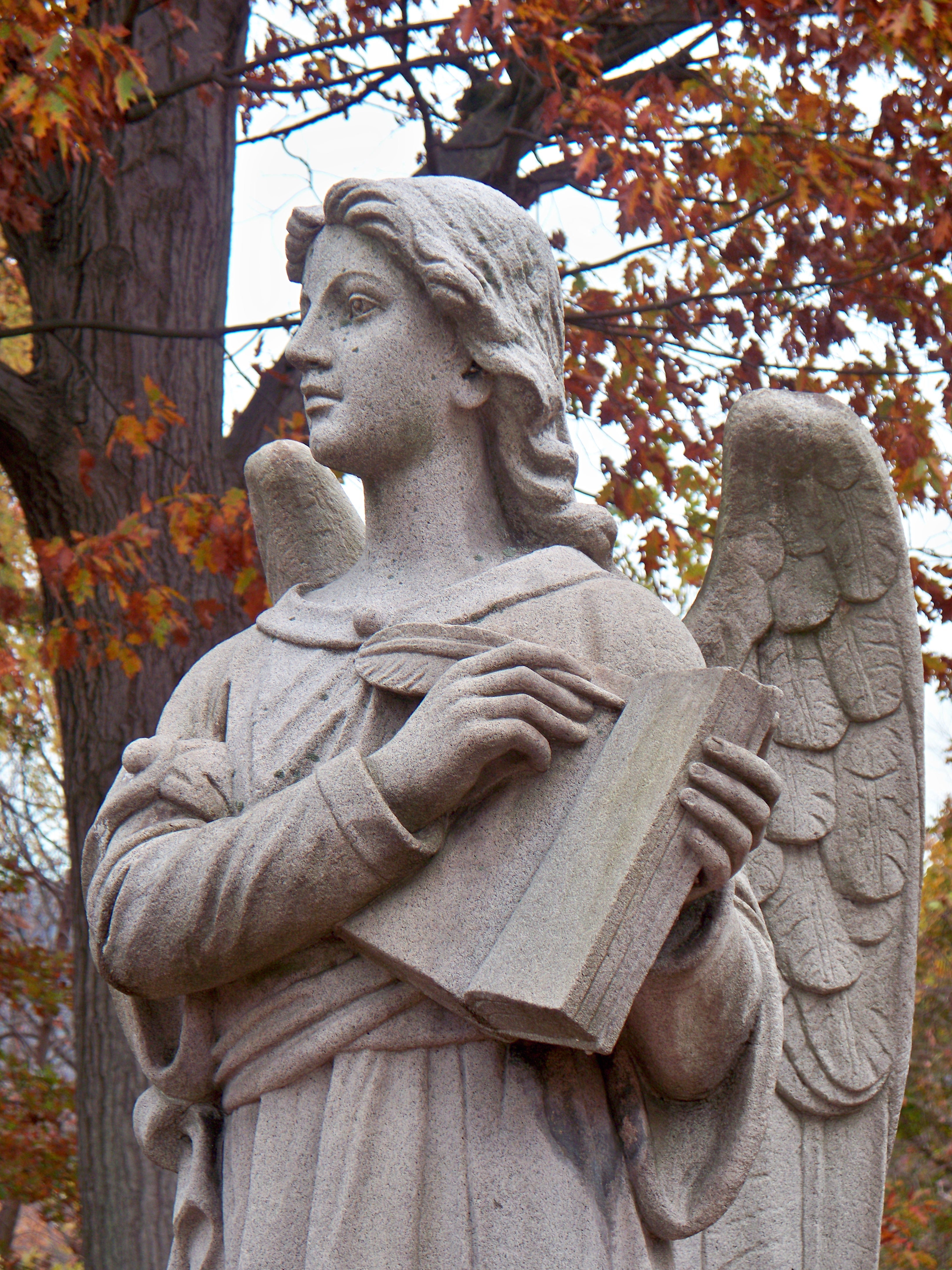
Recording angel (about 1888) marking the Phipps and Loomis family plot, Allegheny Cemetery, Pittsburgh

Recording angels are angels in Judaic, Christian, and Islamic angelology. Recording angels are assigned by God with the task of recording the events, actions, and prayers of each individual human. These include bad sins and good deeds.

== Description ==
In the Book of Malachi 3:16, the prophet describes Heaven as having conferring angels, and "The Lord took note and listened, and a book of remembrance was written before him of those who revered the Lord and thought on his name." In Judaic thought, Gabriel is the principal recording angel, as shown in Ezekiel 9:3-4, where he is "the man clothed in linen, who had the writing case at his side" who put the mark of Passover on Jewish houses in Egypt.

In the Secrets of Enoch (also known as Second Enoch, or Slavonic Enoch) the recording angel is named Pravuil or Vretil: "And the Lord summoned one of his archangels by name Pravuil, whose knowledge was quicker in wisdom than the other archangels, who wrote all the deeds of the Lord..."

== See also ==
- List of angels in theology
- The Recording Angel, statue in Waupun, Wisconsin, United States
- Recording Angel memorial, a stone sculpture in the United Kingdom Parliament, commemorating members and staff who died in the First World War
