= Dobiel =

Guardian angel of Ancient Persia

Dobiel, also Dubbiel (Hebrew: דּוּבִּיאֵל Dūbbīʾēl, "God is my bear"), was the guardian angel of Ancient Persia. According to the Talmud, Dobiel was also one of the special accusers of Israel, and once officiated in Heaven for 21 days as a proxy for Gabriel when the latter was in temporary disgrace for taking pity on the Israelites when God was angry with them and convincing the Babylonians to drive them from Babylon rather than kill them. After coming to power in Heaven, Dobiel set about helping the Persian people at the expense of every other nation. The legend states that all of the 70 or 72 tutelary or guardian angels of nations (except Michael, protector of Israel) became corrupted through national bias.

== See also ==
- List of angels in theology
