= Zotiel (angel) =

Angel in some religions

Zotiel is one of the several angels named in the apocryphal Book of Enoch. The name means "little one of God" in Hebrew. It is also listed as among the 'princes of paradise' in the poet Gustav Davidson's Dictionary of Angels.

== Rendition of the name ==
The angel's name appears as 'Zotiel' in the Codex Panolopitanus and as lamal’ak zutu’el in Ethiopic. Its name is possibly a corruption of 𝞯ό𝜙𝜊ϛ.

== Role in the Book of Enoch and possible guardian of paradise ==
In the 1 Book of Enoch 32:2, the author mentioned encountering the angel Zotiel as he travelled beyond the Erythrean Sea. The angel's name is not mentioned anywhere else in the book nor in other biblical texts. There is some speculation that Zotiel is synonymous with the cherub Johiel, the guardian of the Garden of Eden, although an interpretation of the line in the text where Zotiel's name appears, it could be inferred or implied that Enoch met Zotiel before coming to the Garden. It is also suggested that Zotiel's link with eastward movement might mean he is an angel who resurrects the dead, which is unusual, since no other angels are known to be capable of resurrecting the dead. Zotiel is also interpreted to be a "correspondent of the Tree of life," or its messenger.

== In fiction ==
In Lee Albert Siegel's Love and the Incredibly Old Man: A Novel, he explored a fictionalized conversation between Zotiel, who was a guardian of the Garden of Life, and Enoch. The angel brought Enoch to a spring within the garden after the latter whispered to the former a "password" given by God.

== Notes ==
1. To quote: "And thence I went over the summits of all these mountains, far towards the east of the earth, and passed above the Erythraean sea and went far from it, and passed over the angel Zotiel. And I came to the Garden of Righteousness,"
