= Arariel =

Angel in Judaism

Arariel (also called Azariel) is an angel who, according to the rabbis of the Talmud, takes charge of the waters of the Earth.

== See also ==
- List of angels in theology
