= Kokabiel =

Figure in the Book of Enoch

Kokabiel (Hebrew: כוכבאל, Imperial Aramaic: 𐡊𐡅𐡊𐡁𐡀𐡋, Ancient Greek: χωβαβιήλ), also spelled Kôkabîêl, Kôkhabîêl, Kakabel, Kochbiel, Kokbiel, Kabaiel, Kajabel or Kochab, considered the 'angel of the stars', is a fallen angel, the fourth mentioned of the 20 Watcher leaders of the 200 fallen angels in the Book of Enoch. His name is generally translated as "star of God", which is fitting since it has been said that Kokabiel taught constellations to his associates.

According to The Book of The Angel Raziel, Kokabiel is a holy angel; in other apocryphal lore, however, he is generally considered to be fallen. Kokabiel is said to command an army of 365,000 spirits.

== See also ==
- List of angels in theology
- Raziel
- Tamiel
