= Kalqa'il =

Angel in Islam

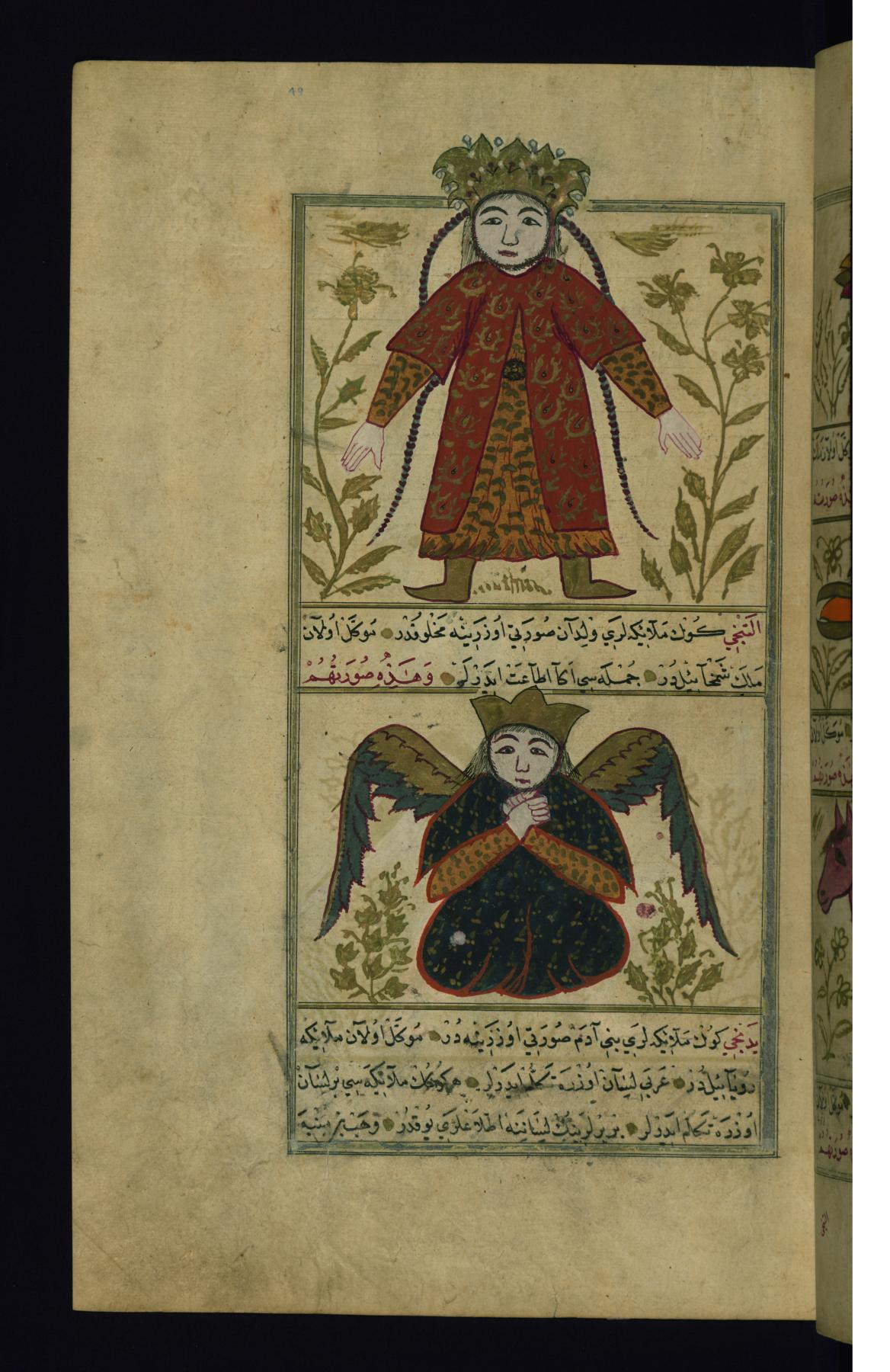
Muhammad ibn Muhammad Shakir Ruzmah-'i Nathani - The Angels Kalka'il and Shamsha'il - Walters W65949A - Full Page

Kalqa'il (Arabic: كلقائيل) is an angel in Islam, who guards the entrance of the fifth heaven and governs the houris. He is also invoked in exorcist rites.

== See also ==
- List of angels in theology
