= Hod (Kabbalah) =

Eighth emanation in Kabbalah

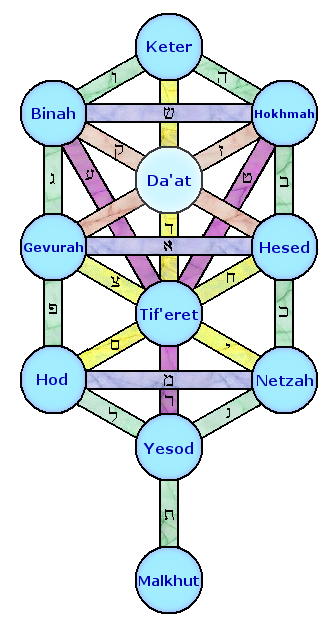
The Sefirot in Kabbalah
The Sefiroth in Jewish Kabbalah
View the image description page for this diagram	The Tree of Life

Hod (Hebrew הוֹד Hōḏ, lit. 'majesty, splendour, glory') is the eighth sephira of the Kabbalistic Tree of Life. It is positioned on the left side of the tree beneath Gevurah (severity) and directly opposite Netzach (eternity).

Hod is associated with qualities such as submission, humility, and intellectual rigor. It represents the capacity to comprehend and articulate divine truths, balancing the emotive and instinctual energies of Netzach. This balance is crucial for maintaining the flow of divine energy through the sefirot and manifesting it in the material world. Hod is also linked to the planet Mercury and the archangel Michael in Western esoteric traditions.

== Description ==
Hod sits below Gevurah and across from Netzach in the tree of life; Yesod is to the south-east of Hod. It has four paths, which lead to Gevurah, Tiphereth, Netzach, and Yesod.

All the sephirot are likened to different parts of the body and the tree itself to a homunculus. Netzach and Hod are likened to the two feet of a person, the left and right. The feet not only bring a person to their place of intention; integrity here at the base of the pillar is foundational to all that stands above.

Hasidic Judaism's view of Hod is that it is connected with Jewish prayer. Prayer is seen as a form of submission; Hod is explained as an analogy - that instead of conquering an obstacle in one's way, (which is the idea of Netzach), subduing oneself to that obstacle is related to the quality of Hod.

Hod is where form is given by language in its widest sense, being the key to the mystery of form (this may be an adoption of a point of view of Jacques Lacan). Our unconscious desires come from Netzach, and are given form in the symbolic realm by Hod, manifesting unconsciously through Yesod to Malkuth.

== In Western esotericism ==
Hod is described as being a force that breaks down energy into different, distinguishable forms, and it is associated with intellectuality, learning and ritual, as opposed to Netzach, Victory, which is the power of energy to overcome all barriers and limitations, and is associated with emotion and passion, music and dancing.

Both these forces find balance in Yesod, foundation, the world of the unconscious, where the different energies created await expression in the lowest world of Malkuth, the Kingdom.

Hod is associated with the god-name of Elohim Tzabaoth. The archangel of this sphere is Michael, and the Bene Elohim is the Angelic order. The opposing demonic force of the qlippoth is Samael.

Hod is said to be the sphere in which the magician mostly works. An example is given by occultist and author Dion Fortune in The Mystical Qabalah:

Imagine primitive man is meditating in the wilderness, and comes in contact with, and begins to understand, some energy that surrounds him. So that he can grasp it better, he creates some form, perhaps the form of a god or a symbol, so he has something he can relate to. He then uses that statue or that symbol in future ceremonies to contact that intangible energy once again. This is the role that Hod plays in magic, while the music and dance that may be present in such a ceremony is the role that Netzach might play, providing the raw energy to reach the higher levels of consciousness.

In comparison with Eastern systems, both Hod and Netzach are sometimes associated with the Manipura chakra (solar plexus chakra), which is associated with the breaking down and releasing of energy, anabolism and catabolism.

In 777, Aleister Crowley associates Hod to the Four Eights of occult tarot among these being Anubis, Thoth, Hanuman, Loki, Hermes, Mercury, Jackal, Hermaphrodite, Opal, Storax, and quicksilver (Not a complete list).

In his lectures to workers in Dornach, 1924, Rudolf Steiner described Hod as bringing about reproduction in humans and is connected with sexuality. We would nowadays call it compassion. ''Hod refers to the inner feeling, the inner movement, the inner compassion with the outer world, that is all Hod''
