= Kerubiel =

Name of an angel in the apocryphal Book of Enoch

Kerubiel (also known as Cherubiel or Cerubiel) ("The Flames Which Dance Around the Throne of God") is the name of an angel in the apocryphal Book of Enoch.

He is the principal regent who has reign over the Cherubim since Creation, and is one of the most exalted princes of Heaven.

Kerubiel is about Seven Heavens tall with a body made of burning coals that is covered with thousands of eyes. His face is made of fire, his eyes spark of light, and his lashes are lightning bolts. Fire spews forth with every word that he speaks, and he is covered with wings from head to toe. Thunder, lightning, and earthquakes are his constant companions, and the splendor of the Shekinah shines upon him. In Enoch's words, Kerubiel is "full of burning coals...there is a crown of holiness on his head... and the bow of the Shekinah is between his shoulders."

== See also ==
- List of angels in theology
