= Marchosias =

Demon in demonology

Seal of Marchosias (Ars Goetia)

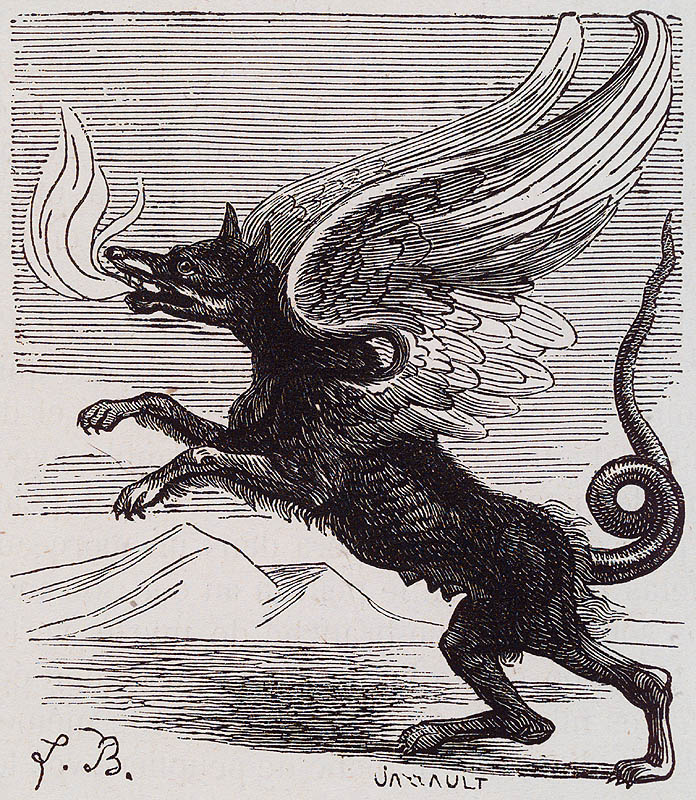
Marchosias appears as a fire-spitting chimeric wolf with the wings of a griffon and the tail of a serpent.

In demonology, Marchosias is a great and mighty Marquis of Hell, commanding thirty legions of demons. In the Ars Goetia, the first book of The Lesser Key of Solomon (17th century), he is depicted as a wolf with griffin wings and a serpent's tail, spewing fire from his mouth. At the request of the magician, he may take the form of a man. He is a strong fighter, gives true answers to all questions, and is very faithful to the magician in following his commands. Before his fall, he belonged to the angelic order of Dominations (or Dominions), and when he was bound by Solomon, he told him that after 1,200 years, he hoped to return to Heaven ("unto the Seventh Throne").

In the Pseudomonarchia Daemonum (1577) of Johann Weyer, the demon is called Marchocias, and his description is much the same as that given in the Goetia except that he manifests as a she-wolf ("a cruel wolf") and spewing forth "I cannot tell what" from his mouth. He likewise hopes to eventually return to the Seventh Throne, but is "deceived in that hope."

Collin de Plancy in his Dictionnaire Infernal (1818) draws on both sources for his description of Marchosias in his catalogue of demons.

The name Marchosias comes from the Late Latin marchio, "marquis".

== In popular culture ==
In James Blish's apocalyptic novel Black Easter, black magician Theron Ware demonstrates his powers to sceptical arms-dealer Baines by performing a "sending" of Marchosias to cause the suicide by poison of an eminent physicist. The goetic ceremony of evocation is described with a vividness and a meticulous attention to detail unusual in a work of fiction.

Marchosias appears in the Legends of Tomorrow season 5 episode "Ship Broken", where he is a hellhound that was previously the dog of famed serial killer Son of Sam.

In Wolf's Curse by Kelley Armstrong, a demon claiming to be Marchosias appears with her hell beasts and she claims to be the creator of werewolves. This is said by a werewolf to be one of many legends as to their creation and that he doesn't know or care if the demon is actually Marochosias.

The ASW-G-35 Gundam Marchosias (ガンダムマルコシアス), rebuilt as the Gundam Hajiroboshi is a mobile suit from the Mobile Suit Gundam: Iron-Blooded Orphans Urdr-Hunt mobile game and is one of the 72 Gundam Frames created during the Calamity War.

The Marchosias Team is a team of aces from the Principality of Zeon in the Mobile Suit Gundam Side Story: Missing Link video game, formed from characters who are unfit for service in the regular forces.

In Genshin Impact, it is revealed that Marchosius (Chinese: 马科修斯), now Guoba (Chinese: 锅巴), was the God of the Stove and Patron God of the Soil. Following a series of calamities, he used up his power to vitalize the land, greatly reducing his physical size and intelligence.

In Myriad Colors Phantom World, Marchosias is a phantom that the main character summons to combat other phantoms.

In the Doctor Who audio play Minuet in Hell, the alien Psionovores adopt the form of Marchosias to trick the story's villain into believing he is making a pact with Hell.

In the Cult of the Lamb Woolhaven DLC, Marchosias is represented as an atheistic cult leader bent on destroying gods and their followers.

== See also ==
- List of demons in the Ars Goetia
