= Haniel =

Angel in Jewish lore and angelology

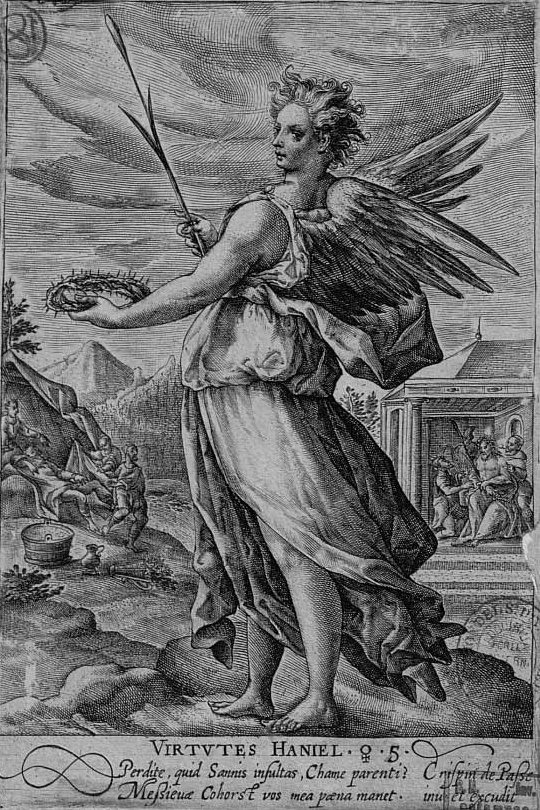
The Virtue Haniel, engraving by Crispijn van de Passe, circa 1575. Biblioteca Nacional de España, Madrid.

Haniel (Hebrew: חַנִּיאֵל, Ḥannīʾēl, "God is my grace"; Coptic: ⲁⲛⲁⲛⲓⲏⲗ Ananiēl; Arabic: أنانيال, 'Anya'il), also known as Hananel, Anael, Hanael or Aniel, is an angel in Jewish lore and angelology, and is often included in lists as being one of the seven archangels. Haniel is generally associated with the planet Venus, and is the archangel of the sephirah Netzach. The name Haniel derives from the Hebrew Ḥēn (חֵן), meaning "grace, favour, charm" (qualities associated with Venus) + the suffix -ʾĒl, "God". It is equivalent to the Phoenician name Hannibal. Haniel is one of the archangels encrypted in the Sigillum Dei Aemeth of Dr. John Dee and Edward Kelley. Haniel is associated with joy.

== Gallery ==
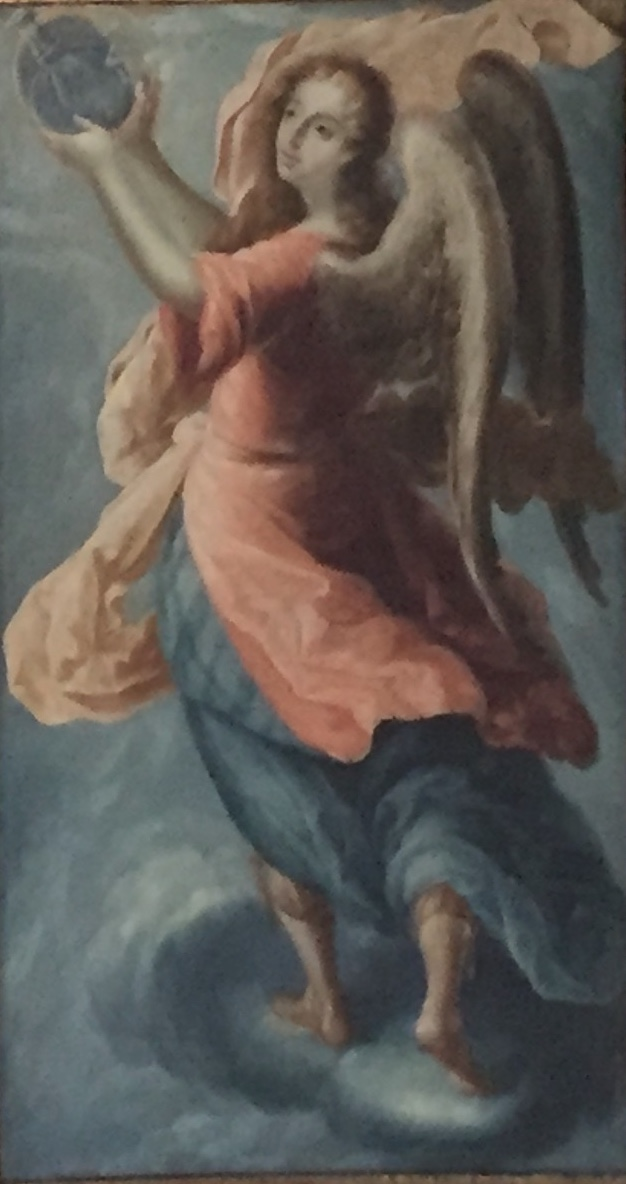
Anael as the regent of the moon, Museo Soumaya Plaza Loreto, Mexico City.

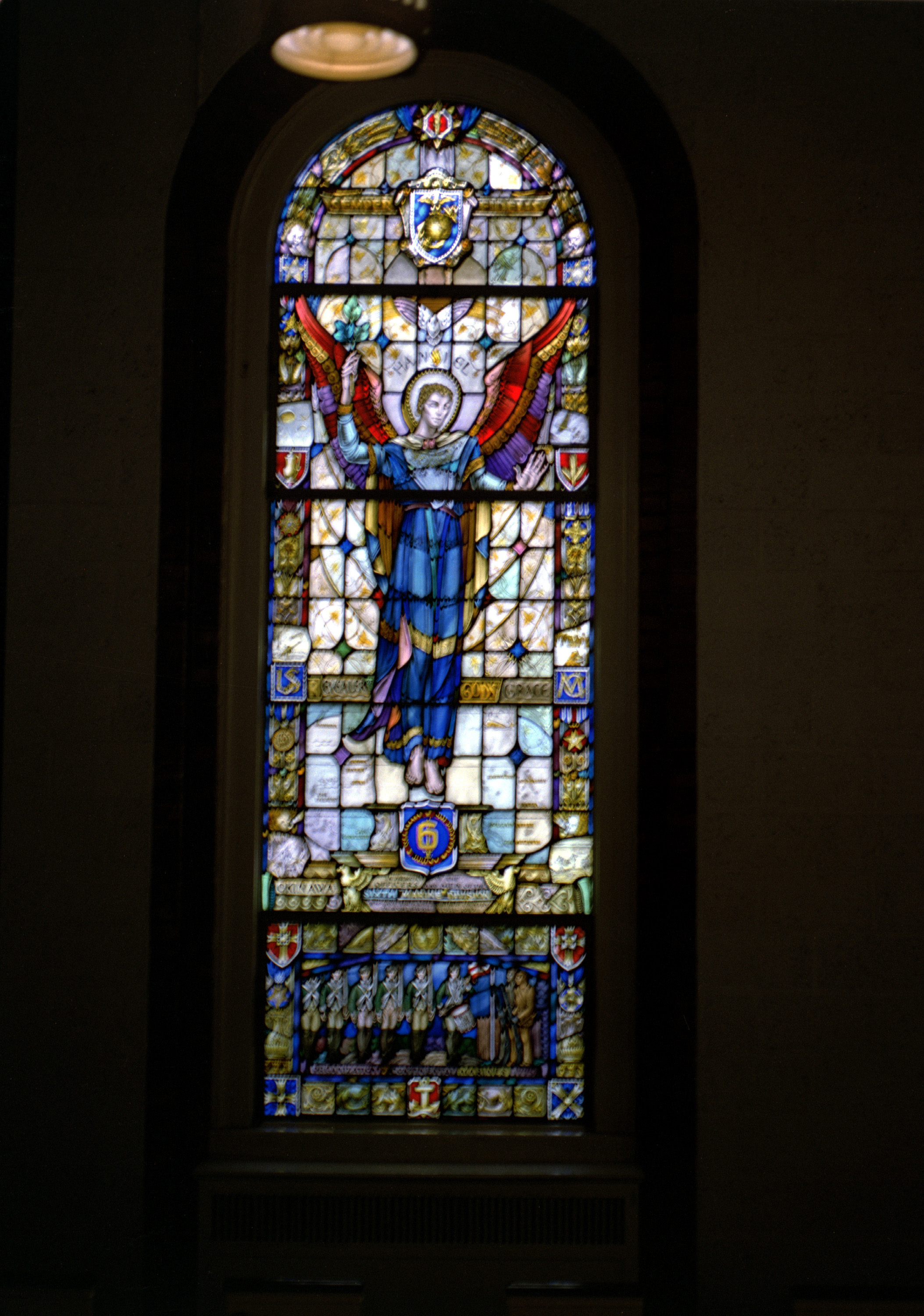
Archangel Haniel, stained-glass window at the Main Protestant Chapel in Marine Corps Base Camp Lejeune, Jacksonville, North Carolina.

== See also ==
- List of angels in theology
