= Artiya'il =

Angel in Islamic lore

Artiya'il (Arabic: رتائيل) is an angel in Islamic lore, believed to remove the grief of humans. He is mentioned in the hadith collection of Jalal Al-Din Al-Suyuti: when Abu Muslim al-Khawlani was awaiting news from Byzantium, the angel came down in the shape of a bird and introduced himself as the angel Artiya'il, the angel who removes the memories of anxiety.

== See also ==
- List of angels in theology
