= Ishim (angel) =

Class of angels

The Ishim (Heb. אִישִׁים, ʾĪšīm; lit. Men by an unusual plural via Prov. 8:4, cf. אנשים) are the lowest tier of angels in the cosmology of Maimonides. "These", writes Maimonides, "are the angels which speak with the prophets and appear to them in visions. They are called Men because their tier is almost within reach of the human mind". The Ishim later appear in the Zohar, which copied this term from Maimonides.

Samuel ibn Tibbon speculated that the term "ishim" has a lost Talmudic origin. Reuven Rappaport suggested Midrash Proverbs to 8:4, which contrasts two terms for men, ishim and bene adam, understanding ishim as more complementary, and writes "O men [ishim] I call to you -- If you are good and follow the Law, you are called men [ishim] like the attending angels." This reflects several Biblical references to angels in human guise (according to Rabbinic tradition) always as ish or anashim and never as bene adam: Dan. 9:21, "And while I was praying the man [ish] Gabriel . . .", Gen. 18:2ff., "And he raised his eyes and saw three men [anashim] standing . . .", Gen. 32:25, "And the man [ish] wrestled with him until dawn came", and Gen. 37:15, "And a man [ish] found him wandering in the field . . ."

== See also ==
- List of angels in theology
