= Pravuil =

Archangel

Pravuil, also known as Vretil, is an archangel briefly mentioned in the Second Book of Enoch as God's scribe and recordkeeper. In Enoch II, God commands Pravuil to bring Enoch writing materials so he could document his journey through the heavens. Charles Russell Coulter and Patricia Turner argue that Pravuil is a Hebrew recasting of the Mesopotamian deity Nabu.

== See also ==
- List of angels in theology
