= Hadraniel =

Angel in Jewish Angelology

Hadraniel (Hebrew: הַדְרַנִיאֵל Hadranīʾēl, alt. Hebrew: הַדְרִיאָנִיאֵל Hadrīʾānīʾēl, "Majesty [or Greatness] of God") is an angel in Jewish Angelology assigned as gatekeeper at the second gate in heaven. He is supposed to be more than sixty myriads of parasangs (approximately 2.1 million miles or 3.4 million kilometers) tall and a daunting figure to face.

When Moses arrived in heaven to get the Torah from God, it was said that he was speechless with awe at the sight of Hadraniel. Hadraniel did not think Moses should have the Torah, and made him weep in fear, which caused God to appear and reprimand Hadraniel for causing problems. Hadraniel quickly decided to behave and acted as a guide for Moses. This was a great help, for (according to Zoharic legend) "when Hadraniel proclaims the will of the Lord, his voice penetrates through 200,000 firmaments." Also, according to the Revelation of Moses, "with every word from his (Hadraniel's) mouth go forth 12,000 flashes of lightning."

In Gnosticism Hadraniel is only one of seven subordinates to Jehuel, prince of fire (King, p. 15). In the Zohar (55b), Hadraniel speaks to Adam about Adam's possession of the Book of the Angel Raziel, which was said to contain secret information that not even the angels knew.

== See also ==
- List of angels in theology
