= Kasbeel =

Angel in the Book of Enoch

Kasbeel (Hebrew: כַּשְׂבְּאֵל), whose name means 'Oath of God', 'Covering of God', 'Conjuror of God', 'The Deceiver of God/'God has deceived', or 'False Counsel of God', is an angel given the responsibility of two oaths in the second section of the Book of Enoch, the book of "Parables".

Before the 200 Watchers fell, their future rebellion was known within the divine foreknowledge, and a mechanism was needed to formally enact this judgment and reveal it. Kasbeel is given a task related to this knowledge; He then approached archangel Michael, the supreme archangel and guardian of Israel. Kasbeel states that to properly carry out his duty regarding the binding of the Watchers, he argues that he must swear the most binding oath, which requires invoking the secret name of the Supreme God. He asks assistance from Michael in the form of revealing to him the secret name (or the secret pronunciation) so that he may swear by it.

With the secret name in his possession, Kasbeel creates and formulates the Oath "Biqa." This oath legally and metaphysically binds them to the rebellious path that was already in their hearts, compelling and leading them to their eventual fate; this ensures it happens and that they are fully accountable for it. This oath revealed the angels within the collection of Grigori that were to fall, that showed all the secrets of the heavens to man.

Kasbeel then uses a second, related oath known as "Akae". He places this oath "in the hand of Michael", granting Michael control of its enforcement. This oath revealed "all the secret things which were done in heaven to the sons of men"; This is the act of the Watchers teaching humanity the "secrets of the cycles of the earth" (astrology), metallurgy, and magic, among others.

== See also ==
- Asbeel
