= Penemue =

Angel in the Book of Enoch

Penemue (deriv. from Heb. פְּנִימִי, penimi — "the inside") is a watcher in Enochian lore. He is a curer of stupidity in man, mentioned in Bereshith Rabba.

The name of the fourth is Penemue: he discovered to the children of men bitterness and sweetness;
And pointed out to them every secret of their wisdom.
He taught men to understand writing, and the use of ink and paper.
Therefore numerous have been those who have gone astray from every period of the world, even to this day.
For men were not born for this, thus with pen and with ink to confirm their faith;
Since they were not created, except that, like the angels, they might remain righteous and pure.
Nor would death, which destroys everything, have effected [sic] them;
But by this their knowledge they perish, and by this also its power consumes them.

== See also ==
- Fallen angel
- List of angels in theology
