= Dominion (angel) =

Class of angels

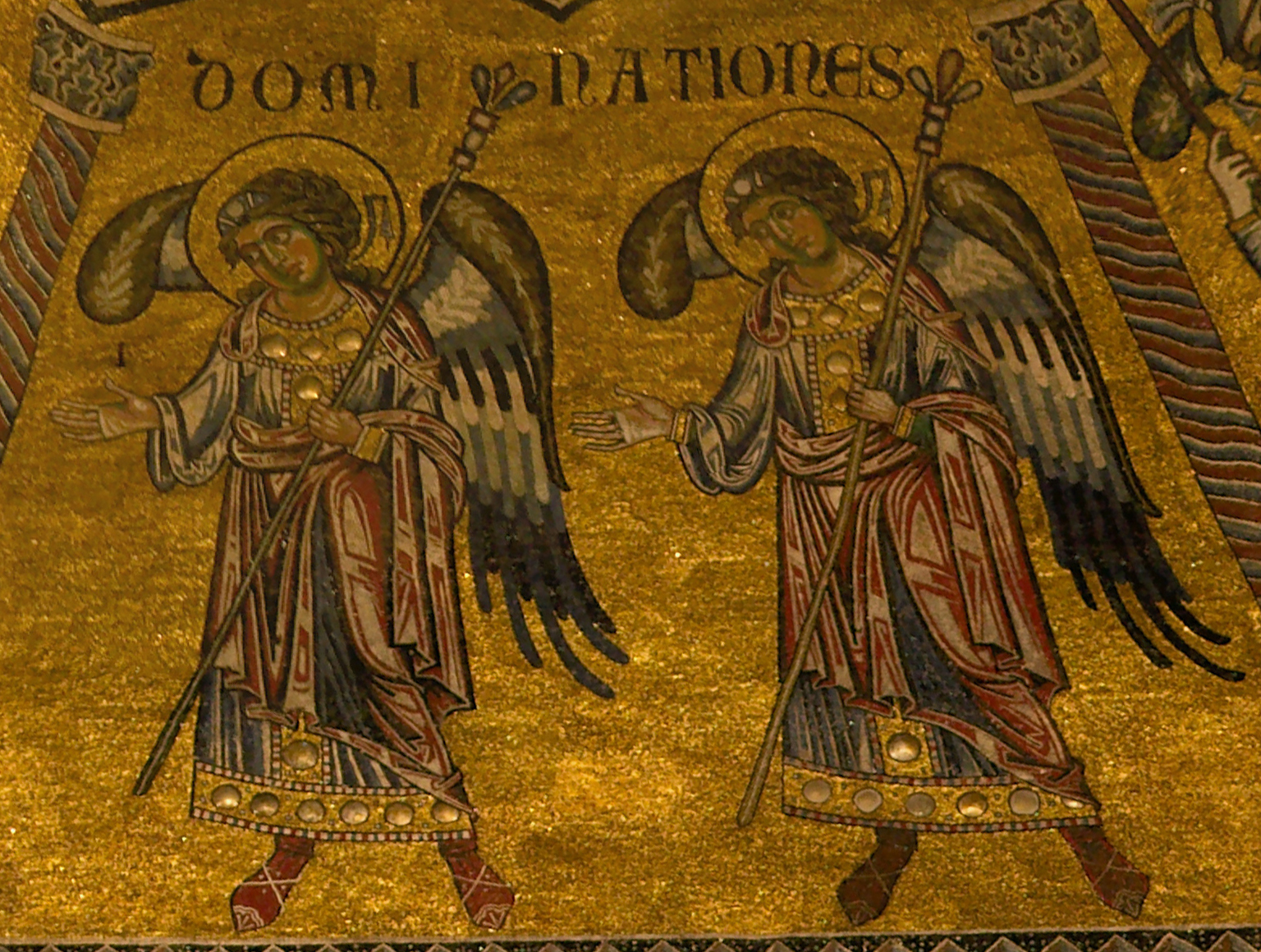
A mosaic meant to portray dominions at the Florence Baptistery.

In Christian angelology, dominions or dominations (lat. dominatio, plural dominationes, also translated from the Greek term kyriotētes, pl. of kyriotēs, as "Lordships") are a class of angels. They are mentioned in the Bible, as stated in Colossians 1:16:

"For by him were all things created, that are in heaven, and that are in earth, visible and invisible, whether they be thrones, or dominions, or principalities, or powers: all things were created by him, and for him."

Pseudo-Dionysius the Areopagite ranks dominions as 4th in his angelic hierarchy.

Dominions are seen in the Seventh Heaven by Enoch according to the Second Book of Enoch.
