= Ambriel =

Angel associated with the Sun sign Gemini

Ambriel is an angel who is associated with the sun sign of Gemini and the month of May.

Catholicism regards an angel as a pure spirit created by God and this angel inspires clear communication and is also considered to be an angel of general protection.

Ambriel is referred to in the Magical Calendar. Planetanum Sigilla, from Harl. 3420(27v). Ambriel is also attributed to the Queen of Cups in the Tarot (according to Aleister Crowley and the Hermetic Order of the Golden Dawn).
