= Sandalphon =

Archangel in Jewish and Christian writings

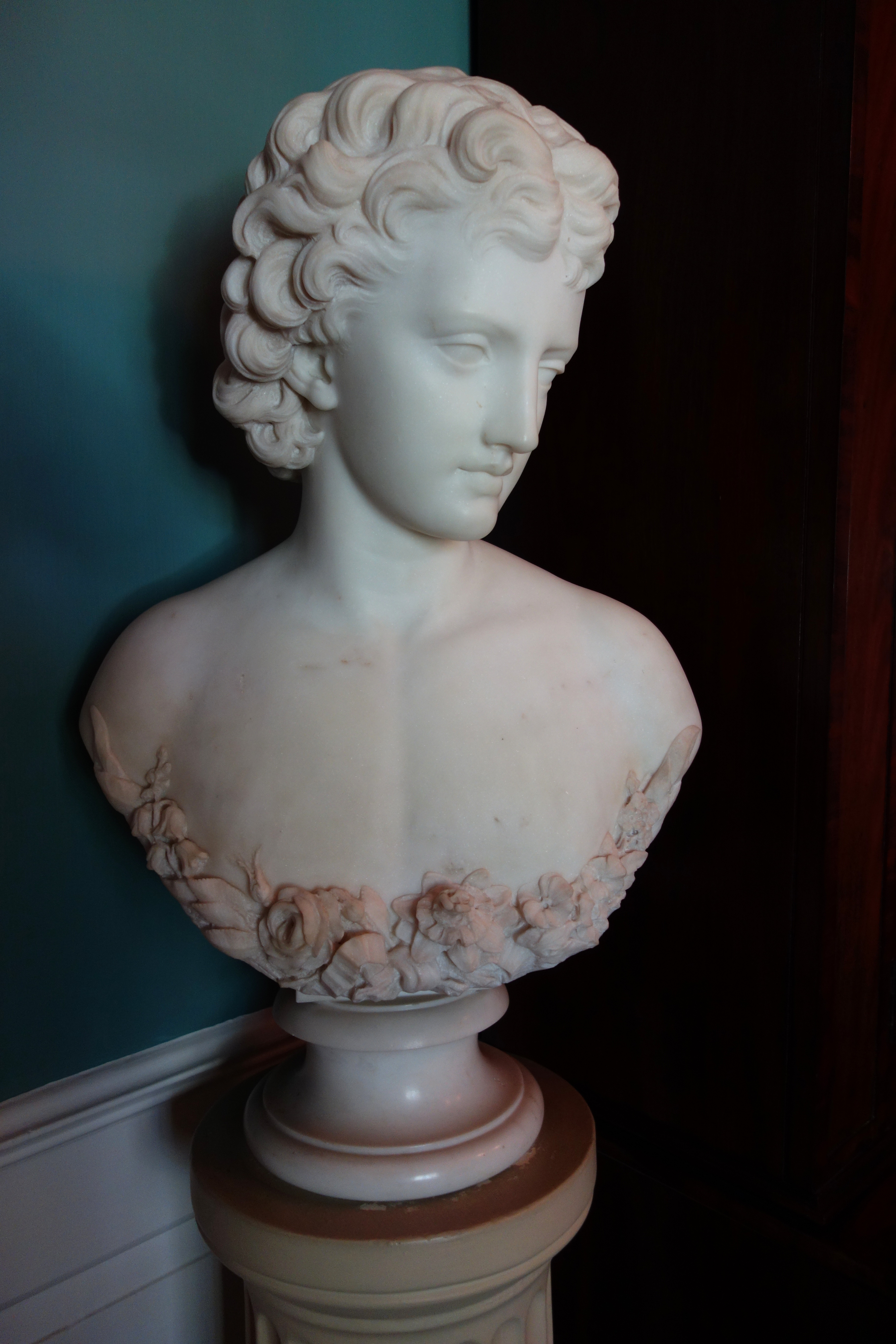
Sandalphon by Florence Freeman

Sandalphon (Hebrew: סַנְדַּלְפוֹן Sandalp̄ōn; Greek: Σανδαλφών Sandalphṓn) is an archangel in Jewish and Christian writings, although not in scripture. Sandalphon figures prominently in the mystical literary traditions of Rabbinic Judaism and early Christianity, notably in the Midrash, Talmud, and Kabbalah and is generally seen as gathering prayers and passing them on to God.

== Origin ==
Although not explicitly referenced in scripture, some of the earliest sources on Sandalphon refer to him as the prophet Elijah transfigured and risen to angelic status. Other sources (mainly from the midrashic period) describe him as the "twin brother" of Metatron, whose human origin as Enoch is similar to the human origin of Sandalphon.

== Meaning of name ==
The name Sandalphon, which may be related to the Hebrew sandek, godfather (thereby corresponding to the tradition of a station held by Elijah with regard to evocation of the prophet in his capacity being protector of unborn children), may also be derived from the Greek prefix syn-, meaning "together", and adelphos, meaning "brother"; thus approximately meaning "co-brother", since the modern Greek word for "co-worker", synádelphos (συνάδελφος), has these roots as seen in the Book of Revelation, chapter 19, verse 10. This probably refers to Sandalphon's relationship to Metatron, although this derivation shows uncertain Semitic influences.

== Descriptions and functions ==
Physical descriptions of Sandalphon vary depending on the source. He is uniformly depicted as extremely tall—he exceeds Hadraniel in height by a 500-year foot journey. During Moses' visit to the Third Heaven, he is said to have glimpsed Sandalphon and called him the "tall angel", though this legend dates to much later than the time of the Torah. The Babylonian Talmud Hagigah 13b says Sandalphon's head reaches Heaven, which is also said of Israfil and of the Greek monster Typhon, with whom Sandalphon seems to have similar mythological roots. He is also described as being a member of the śārim (Hebrew: שָׂרִים "princes"), and a Hazzan (חַזָּן master of heavenly song).

In the Greater Key of Solomon, Sandalphon is designated "the left-hand feminine cherub of the Ark of the Covenant". In the liturgy for Sukkot, he is credited with gathering the prayers of the faithful, making a garland of such prayers, and then "adjuring them to ascend as an orb to the supreme King of Kings". In the Zohar he is "chief of the Seventh Heaven". As Michael does, he carries on a ceaseless battle with Samael (perhaps Satan), angel of evil.

The ancient sages also referred to him by the name Ophan (אוֹפַן "wheel"), a reference to the "wheel within the wheel" from Ezekiel's vision of the heavenly chariot in the Book of Ezekiel chapter 1. Sandalphon is also said to be instrumental in bringing about the differentiation of sex in the embryo.

Ibn Hazm describes Sandalphon as an angel "who serves the crown". He further states that the Jews, though regarding Metatron as an angel, celebrate him as a lesser god for 10 days in each year (probably a reference to Rosh Hashanah in connection with Merkabah mysticism - in which Metatron is conceived actually to have played a part in the creation of the world).

In Kabbalah, Sandalphon is the angel who represents the sephirah Malkuth and overlaps (or is confused with) the angel Metatron. He is said to appear before the feminine presence of the Shekhinah and to receive human prayers and send them to God.

== In literature ==
Sandalphon is the eponymous subject of Henry Wadsworth Longfellow's poem "Sandalphon".

== See also ==
- List of angels in theology
