= Reshit Chochmah =

16th-century book of Kabbalah, ethics and morality

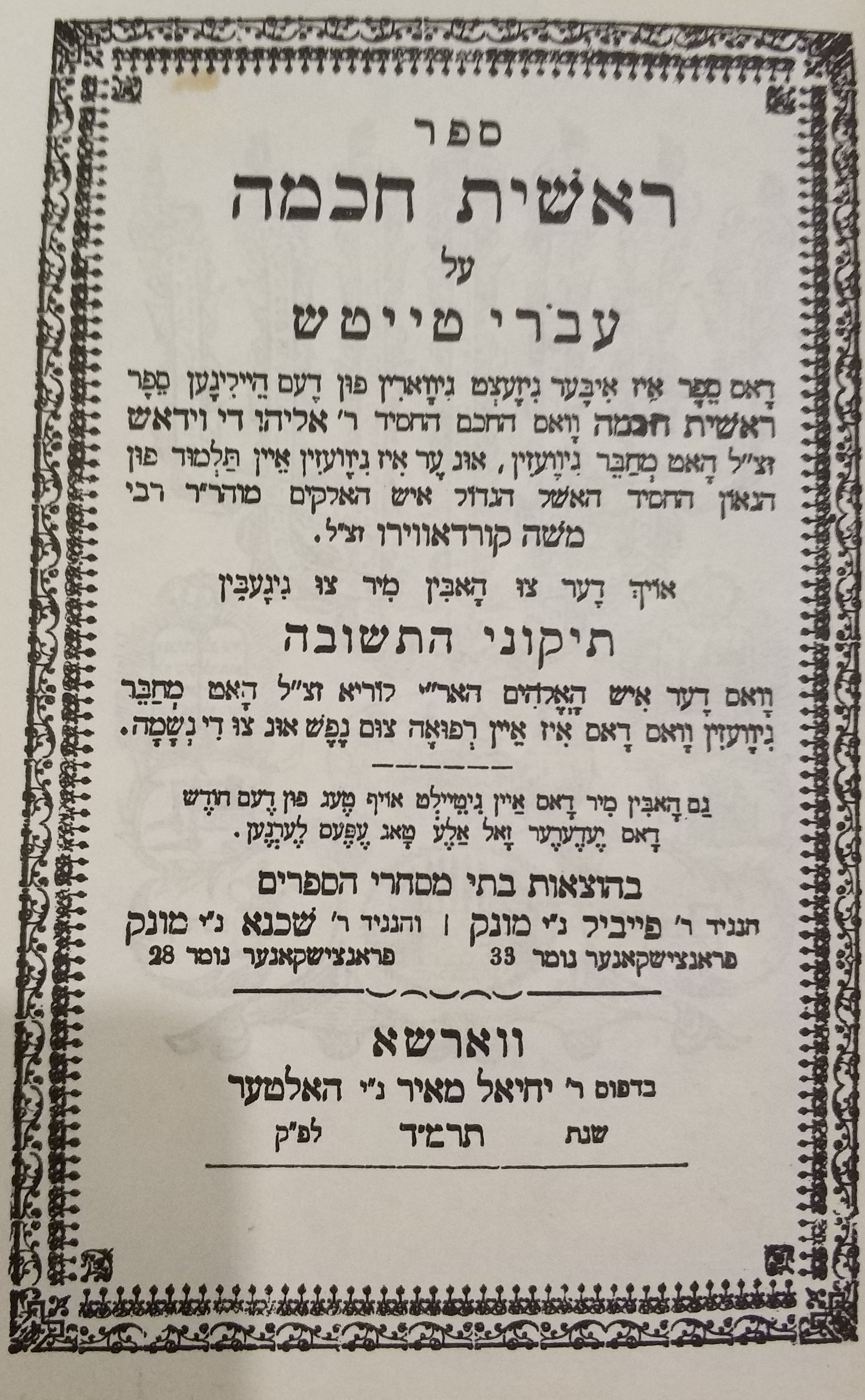
1884 Warsaw

Reshit Chochmah is an important book of Kabbalah (Jewish mysticism), ethics and morality (Musar literature), written by the 16th century scholar Rabbi Eliyahu de Vidas. It is based largely on the Zohar. Its name literally translates into “the beginning of Wisdom”, in allusion to the Biblical verse "The fear of the Lord is the beginning of wisdom".

== Overview ==
Reshit Chochmah describes a method of meditation that combines visualization and permutation of Hebrew letters, and is intended to inspire the reader with a sense of purity and holiness, if studied on a regular basis. The book presents a combination of ethical and moral teaching with Kabbalah. The book shows the path to the uninitiated to enter the world and wisdom of Kabbalah. In a very easy and understandable style, the book explains to the reader the ways to attain the higher level of Divine awareness which the Holy One wishes for His beloved people, Israel.

One of the last chapters of the book deals with Derekh Eretz (Etiquette), in which the author expands on its importance, writing that "Whosoever is careful in what concerns proper manners and interacts with his fellow man, he is destined to prolong his life [upon earth]."

The book has continued to be popular ever since its publication.
