= Tamiel =

Fallen Angel

Tamiel (or Tumiel; Imperial Aramaic: תומיאל, Ancient Greek: Ταμιήλ), also spelled Tâmîêl, is a fallen angel, the fifth mentioned of the 20 watcher leaders of the 200 fallen angels in the Book of Enoch. Tamiel is also called either Kasdaye (also Kasdeja, from Aramaic כַּשְׂדָּי kaśdāy—"Chaldean", "inhabitant of Chaldea", "astrologer") or Kasyade (prob. compd. of כָּסָה kasah—"to conceal" + יָד yad—"hand", "power"; lit. "covered hand", "hidden power") in the Book of Enoch, Chapter 69.

Michael Knibb lists the translation of Tamiel as "God is Perfect" or "Perfection of God" (the combination of tamiym and El-God). Tamiel was attributed as a teacher of astronomy (Enoch 8:7). He also taught "the children of men all of the wicked strikes of spirits, [the strikes of] demons, and the strikes of the embryo in the womb so that it may pass away (abortion), and [the strikes of the soul], the bites of the serpent, and the strikes which befall through the noontide heat, [which is called] the son of the serpent named Taba'et (meaning male)" during the days of Noah, not the days of Jared (Enoch 69:12).

== Popular culture ==
- Tamiel appears as the enemy in the Supernatural season 10 episode "Angel Heart" where he is killed with his own angel sword by Claire Novak.
- Tamiel is the name of one of the Scavengers in The Walking Dead, first appearing in Episode 10 of Season 7.
- Thamiel is the name of the fallen angel in Scott Alexander’s novel Unsong.

== See also ==
- List of angels in theology
- Kokabiel
- Ramiel
