= Sahaquiel =

Archangel

Sahaquiel or also Shachaqiel is listed as one of the seven great archangels in the seventeenth Chapter of the Third Book of Enoch from the Apocrypha of the Hebrew Bible, described as "the guardian of the fourth heaven ... prince of a heavenly host ... attended by 496,000 myriads of minstering angels.". Sahaquiel literally means Ingenuity of God.

== See also ==
- List of angels in theology
