= Netzach =

Seventh emanation in Kabbalah

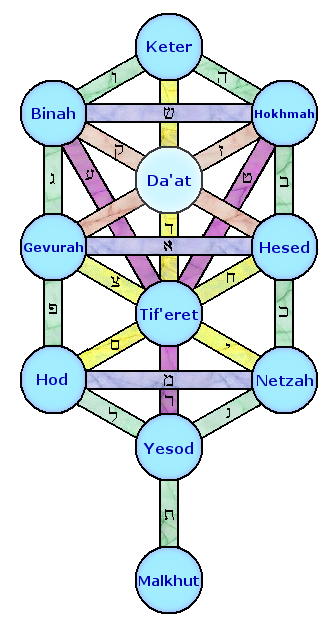
The Sefirot in Kabbalah
The Sefiroth in Jewish Kabbalah
| View the image description page for this diagram | The Tree of Life |

Netzach (Hebrew: נֶצַח, romanized: Nēṣaḥ, lit. 'eminence, everlastingness, perpetuity') is the seventh of the ten sefirot in the Jewish mystical system of Kabbalah. It is located beneath Chesed ('loving-kindness'), at the base of the "Pillar of Mercy" which also consists of Chokmah ('wisdom'). Netzach generally translates to 'eternity', and in the context of Kabbalah refers to 'victory' (literal meaning), 'perpetuity', or 'endurance'. Within the Sefiroth, Netzach sits geometrically across from Hod.

Netzach is "endurance," the fortitude, and patience to follow through on passions. It is paired with Hod as the righteous attributes related to group interactivity, with Netzach being leadership, the ability to rally others to a cause and motivate them to act; while Hod is community, the ability to do the footwork needed to follow through on ideas and make them happen. Netzach is identified with the right (left leg or foot) when the tree of life is portrayed on the human form, while Hod is on the left (right leg or foot).

The angelic order of Netzach is the Elohim, the ruling Archangel of which is Haniel.
