= Erelim =

Angel class in Judaism

Erelim (Hebrew: אֶרְאֶלִּים, ʾErʾellīm; sing. אֶרְאֵל, ʾErʾēl; "valiant ones"), is a class of angel whose existence is derived from a verse in the book of Isaiah regarding the impending invasion of Jerusalem by Sennacherib during the reign of King Hezekiah.

While the erelim are ascribed numerous functions in Jewish and Kabbalistic texts and literature, they most often appear to be associated with moments of death and national tragedy. They appear in multiple angelic hierarchies, ranking first among the ten orders of angels in the Berit Menuchah, second in the Zohar, third by Maimonides, and tenth in the Maseket Azilut.

== See also ==
- Angels in Judaism
- Jewish angelic hierarchy
