= Berit Menuchah =

14th century Jewish mystical work

Berit Menuchah (Hebrew: סֵפֶר בְּרִית מְנוּחָה, romanized: Sēp̱er bərit̲ mənuḥāh; also Berit Menuḥa, Berith Menuḥa, or Brit Menucha) is a practical Kabbalah work written in the 14th century by Abraham ben Isaac of Granada. It consists of a system of theurgy which uses the names of God in Judaism and his emanations for spiritual and magical purposes. An English translation thereof was published in 2007.

== Contents ==
The Berit Menuḥa focuses on a complex system describing the various hypostases of the divine world and God, and associating them with the niqqudot or vowel markings of the Hebrew script. Especially central is the role of the divine, angelic, and magical names associated with the various sefirot or divine emanations described. They are often given magical uses, and the text usually specifies whether the practitioner needs to be pure or not to use them. Some of the names are typical Kabbalistic names of God, but the majority are derived by Notarikon from biblical verses:

And it was discovered that the Malachim were created from the wind and the fine and enlightening air, and that the name of their origin עַמַרֻמְאֵליוְהָ was derived from the verse (Psalms 104:4): ‘Who makest the winds thy messengers, fire and flame thy ministers’ (.....) And when the lights reach this Sefira, they unite and receive a name that is derived from the central letters of the following verse (Genesis 6:2): ‘The sons of God saw that the daughters of men were fair; and they took to wife such of them as they chose.’ And this valiant name, which is drawn in the Gevura, is רְנֵלבֺנקְהֵכשְיִהְ.

Angels and their names also feature prominently in the text, and one section lists dozens of them and their areas of dominion, such as animals, trees, elements, etc.:

The angel רוחיאל (Rohiel) is in charge of the winds; he is the captain of three angels: חזקיה , עוזיאל and עזאל (Uziel, Hezekiah and Azael). The angel גבריאל (Gabriel) is in charge of the thunders. The angel נוריאל (Nuriel) is in charge of the hailstones. The angel מקטוניאל (Miktoniel?) is in charge of the rocks. The angel טלפיאל (Talpiel) is in charge of the trees that bear fruits. The prince שרואל (S'ruel/Sh'ruel?) is in charge of the fruitless trees. And the angel סנדלפון (Sandalphon) is in charge of human beings.
