= Abraham ben Isaac of Granada =

Abraham ben Isaac of Granada (הר"ר אברהם ב"ר יצחק מרמון), also known as Abraham Merimon, was a Kabbalist of the thirteenth century.

== Works ==
Abraham wrote:

- Sefer ha-Berit: A work on the Kabbala. Moses Botarel quotes this work in the introduction to his commentary on the Sefer Yeẓirah.
- Berit Menuḥah (Covenant of Rest): Another work on the Kabbala valued highly by Isaac Luria for its profound comments. Its language, as well as how Simon ben Yohai is introduced as speaker, shows a striking resemblance to the Zohar, and it may be that the author had a larger version of the Zohar before him than is now extant. Unlike the Zohar, however, Berit Menuḥah is primarily focused on practical Kabbalah and the powers of divine names and angels.
- Megalle ha-Ta'alumot: quoted by the author in the work previously mentioned.

== Jewish Encyclopedia bibliography ==
- Adolf Jellinek, Auswahl Kabbalistischer Mystik, i.9 (German part);
- Michael, Heimann Joseph (1891) Or ha-Ḥayyim, Frankfort-on-the-Main (in Hebrew), No. 146;
- Isaac ben Jacob Benjacob, Oẓar ha-Sefarim, pp. 84, 86, 292.
