= Throne (angel) =

Class of angels

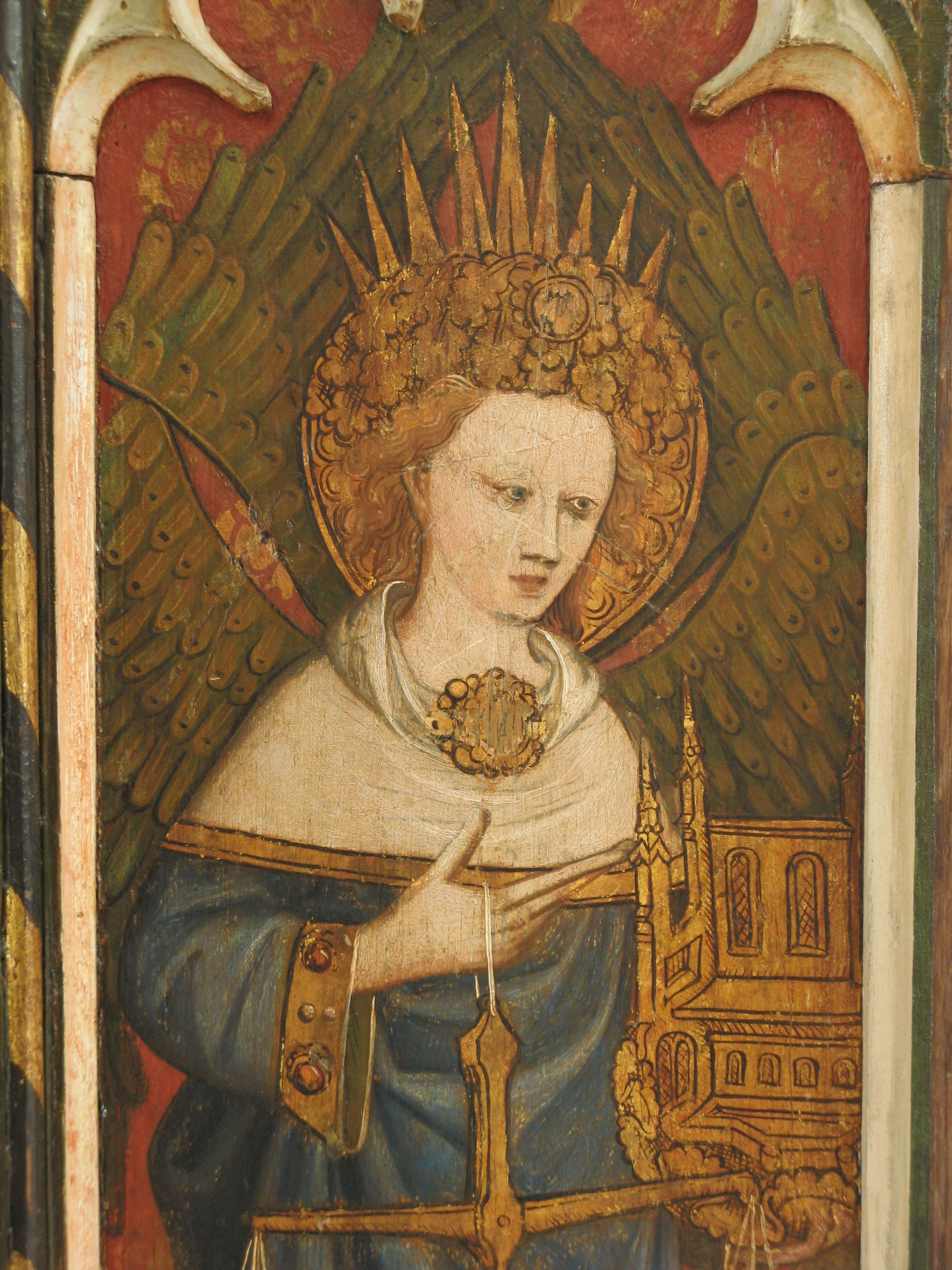
Thrones from Barton Turf Rood Screen, Norfolk, U.K.

In Christian angelology, thrones (Ancient Greek: θρόνος, pl. θρόνοι; Latin: thronus, pl. throni; Hebrew: אוֹפַנִּים) are a class of angels. This is based on an interpretation of Colossians 1:16. According to 1 Peter 3:21-22, Christ had gone to Heaven and "angels and authorities and powers" had been made subject to him.

Pseudo-Dionysius the Areopagite in his work De Coelesti Hierarchia includes the thrones as the third highest of nine levels of angels.

According to the Second Book of Enoch, thrones are seen by Enoch in the Seventh Heaven.

== Christian angelology ==
According to Matthew Bunson, the corresponding order of angels in Judaism is called the abalim (אבלים), aralim or erelim, but this opinion is far from universal. The Hebrew word erelim is usually not translated "thrones", but rather "valiant ones", "heroes", or "warriors". The function ascribed to erelim in Isaiah 33:7 and in Jewish folklore is not consistent with the lore surrounding the thrones.

Thrones are sometimes equated with ophanim since the throne of God is usually depicted as being moved by wheels, as in the vision of Daniel 7:9 (Old Testament). Rosemary Ellen Guiley (1996: p. 37) states that:

Ophan or "Wheel"

The 'thrones'; also known as 'ophanim' (offanim) and 'galgallin', are creatures that function as the actual chariots of God driven by the cherubs. They are characterized by peace and submission; God rests upon them. Thrones are depicted as great wheels containing many eyes, and reside in the area of the cosmos where material form begins to take shape. They chant glorias to God and remain forever in his presence. They mete out divine justice and maintain the cosmic harmony of all universal laws..

== See also ==
- Ophanim
- List of angels in theology
