= Gustav Davidson =

American poet (1895–1971)

- Born: December 25, 1895; Warsaw, Prussia (now Poland)
- Died: February 6, 1971 (aged 75); Santa Cruz, California, U.S.
- Education: Columbia University (BA, MA)
- Occupations: Poet, writer, publisher

Gustav Davidson (December 25, 1895 – February 6, 1971) was an American poet, writer, and publisher. He was a one-time secretary of the Poetry Society of America.

== Biography ==
Gustav Davidson was born on December 25, 1895, in Warsaw, Prussia (now Poland). In the wake of anti-Jewish pogroms in Prussia, his family fled to the United States, settling in New York City in 1907. Davidson received bachelor's and master's degrees at Columbia University in 1919 and 1920 respectively. He worked for the Library of Congress between 1938 and 1939 and became executive secretary of the Poetry Society of America from 1949 to 1965 (after which he was elected executive secretary emeritus).

== A Dictionary of Angels ==
He is today best remembered as the author of A Dictionary of Angels, Including the Fallen Angels (1967), a popular work detailing the types of angel classes and their roles. This was a popularised compendium of angelology from Talmud, kabbalah, medieval occult writers, gothic grimoires and other sources. He also wrote articles, such as on encounters with angels, in the parapsychological Tomorrow magazine of medium Eileen J. Garrett.

== Poetry ==
In addition to the Dictionary, Davidson published several collections of his poems, including Songs of Adoration (1919), Twenty Sonnets (1926), Lilith (1928), Mortal Hunger (1943), Thirst of the Antelope (1945), Moment of Visitation (1950), Ambushed by Angels & Other Poems (1965), and All Things Are Holy (1970). He wrote a dramatic adaptation of Melmoth the Wanderer in collaboration with playwright Joseph Koven. As the titles of some of his works indicate, much of Davidson's verse is religious and spiritual in outlook and subject matter.

Davidson edited A Half Century of Sonnets (1924), and the 1950 collection In Fealty to Apollo for the Poetry Society of America, an organization for which he served as secretary. (The society established a Gustav Davidson Memorial Award in his honor.) He also edited periodicals devoted to poetry: The Poetry Chapbook and Poet Lore: A Quarterly of World Literature. He headed Fine Editions Press and established and ran the Davidson Printing Corporation, both of which specialized in the publication of contemporary poetry.

Beyond the confines of poetry, Davidson wrote First Editions in American Juvenilia and Problems in Their Identification (1939) and other works on bibliography and book collecting. He was also active as a translator and a book designer.

== Works ==
- Melmoth, the wanderer; a play in five acts Boston, The Poet Lore Company 1915
- Songs of adoration Boston, The Madrigal 1919
- A half century of sonnets New York, N.L. Brown, 1924
- First editions in American juvenilia and problems in their identification, [Chicago] Normandie House c1939
