= List of Aramaic acronyms =

This is a list of Jewish Babylonian Aramaic and Jewish Palestinian Aramaic acronyms prominently featured in the Gemara.

This list is far from complete; you can help by expanding it.

== Sorting order ==
The entries in each section are sorted according to the Hebrew alphabet. Prefixes indicating prepositions and articles (such as ב, ד, ה, ש, כ) have been removed, with the following exceptions:

- Where the acronym is incomprehensible or meaningless without the prefix
- Where the prefix is so integral to the acronym that variants without it rarely, if ever, occur

== Numeronyms ==
Some abbreviations included here are actually gematria (Hebrew numeronyms), but the number is so closely associated with some noun that it is grammatically used as a noun and is synonymous with it, for example ב"ן, Ban. Other abbreviations contain a variable gematria component alongside other words, like the chapter references פי"א perek yud-alef (chapter 11) or פ"ט perek tet (chapter 9). Rather than list separate entries for every possible gematria, or use only one number for an example, the gematria component is replaced with [x] to produce (for example) [x]"פ.

== Hebrew acronyms ==
Some Hebrew acronyms are not included here; they may be found in the List of Hebrew acronyms.

Many of the abbreviations here are similar or identical to corresponding Hebrew acronyms. In fact, a work written in Aramaic may have Hebrew acronyms interspersed throughout (ex. Talmud, Midrash), much as a Hebrew work may borrow from Aramaic (ex. Tanya).

== List ==
=== א ===
- אחד/אחת, א (echat/echad) - one
- אמר ליה, א''ל (amer liah) - [...] said to [...] (in response). Frequently used in the middle of a tanaic discussion between the Rabbis. See also א''ר
- אי אפשר, א"א (ee efshar) - [it is] impossible
- איו אומרים, א"א (ein omrim) - we cannot say
- אריך אנפין, א"א (Arich Anpin) - The Partzuf of Hochma, the central, initial Partzuf in the world of Atzilut, from which all the other Partzufim originate. There is a special Partzuf, a system called Arich Anpin. Through it, the Light trickles downward and descends on us in droplets. We are unable to perceive the Light as a direct flow, but only drop by drop.
- אצילות בריאה יצירה עשיה, אבי"ע (Abiya, Atzilut, Beriah, Yetzirah, Asiah) - (Kabbalah) the Four Worlds. See בי"ע
- איכא דאמרי, א"ד (eeka d-amray) - there are those who say
- אחר כך, אח"כ (achar kach) - afterwards
- ארץ ישראל, א"י (eretz yisroel) - the land of Israel, often referred to as Eretz Yisroel
- 'אפילו, אפי (afilu) - even, even if
- 'אצילות, אצי (Atzilut) - (Kabbalah) the highest of the Four Worlds. See אבי"ע
- אדם קדמון, א"ק (Ak, Adam Kadmon) - (Kabbalah) Primordial Man, a spiritual level transcending Atzilut
- אמר רבי, א"ר (amar rabi) - rabbi said
- אמרו רז"ל, ארז"ל (amru razal) - the sages said. See also רז"ל
- אין צריך, א"צ (ain zarikh) - not necessary, not required

=== ב ===
- בבא בתרא, ב"ב (Bava Batra) - a tractate of the Talmud, lit. final gate
- בית דין, ב"ד (beit din) - Jewish court of three adult men, lit. house of judgement. See also בי"ד
- בית הלל, ב"ה (Beit Hillel) - the academy of Hillel, lit. the house of Hillel
- בית דין, בי"ד (beit din) - Jewish court of three adult men, lit. house of judgement. See also ב"ד
- בריאה יצירה עשיה, בי"ע (Biya, Beriah, Yetzirah, Asiah) - (Kabbalah) the three nethermost of the Four Worlds, where the denizens thereof are aware of their own existence. See אבי"ע
- בבא מציעא, ב"מ (Bava Metzia) - a tractate of the Talmud, lit. middle gate
- ב"ן (Ban) - (Kabbalah) a spelling-out of the Tetragrammaton numerically equal to 52, the gematria of ב"ן. (Usually appears as שם ב"ן)
- בסיעטא דשמיא, ב"סד (besiyata dishmaya) - with the help of Heaven. Typically at the top right corner of a printed or written page. See also ב"ה in the List of Hebrew acronyms
- בבא קמא, ב"ק (Bava Kama) - a tractate of the Talmud, lit. first gate
- בית שמאי, ב"ש (Beit Shammai) - the academy of Shammai, lit. the house of Shammai

=== ג ===
- 'גומר(ה), גו (gomra/gomer) - etcetera
- גם כן, ג"כ (gam kein) - as well, lit. like so also
- 'גמרא, גמ (Gemara) - the explanation and discussion of the Mishna as printed in the Talmud

=== ד ===
- דאם כן, דא"כ (de'im kein) - because if so
- דבר אחר, ד"א (dvar achar) - alternatively, another explanation (lit. another thing)

=== ה ===
- הרי הוא, ה"ה (harei hu) - it is, he is
- 'הוי (Havayeh) - (Kabbalah) "God," (a rearrangement of the letters indicating) the Tetragrammaton, indicating kindness, mercy and revelation
- הרי זה, ה"ז (harei zeh) - this is
- הוה ליה למימר, הול"ל (havah leih lemeimar) - shouldn't he have said
- היה ליה, ה"ל (huh liah) - derive [from]
- הני מילי, ה"מ (hanei milei) - this statement, lit. these words
- הכי גמרינן, ה"ג (Hachi Gamrinan) - this is how we read it
- 'השם, ה (haShem) - literally 'the Name', God
- הקדוש ברוך הוא, הקב''ה (haKadosh Baruch Hu) - the holy One blessed be He i.e God

ו

• 'וגומר, וגו (vegumar) - and so forth, etc.

=== ח ===
- חס ושלום, ח"ו (chas veshalom) - Heaven forbid, lit. compassion and peace
- חֹל שמּוֹעֵד, חוש״מ (Chol SheMo'ed) - the "weekday" in/of the festival [when certain types of melacha are permitted]

=== ט ===
- טלית גדול, ט"ג (talit gadol) - the large talit

=== י ===
- יצר הטוב, יצה"ט (yetzer hatov) - the good inclination. See also יצ"ט
- יצר הרע, יצה"ר (yetzer hara) - the evil inclination
- יצר טוב, יצ"ט (yetzer tov) - good inclination. See also יצה"ט

=== כ ===
- כי אם, כ"א (ki im) - unless
- 'כולו, כו (chulu)- etcetera
- כל שכן, כ"ש (kol shekein) - all the more so. See also ק"ו
- כהן גדול, כ"ג (Kohen Gadol) - high priest

=== ל ===
- 'לשון, ל (lashon) - relating to, lit. tongue/language (used to indicate etymology or a definition)
- לא שנא, ל''ש (la shena) - it doesn't matter if [...], there's no difference if [...]
- למ"ד, למאן דאמר (leman damer) - according to the one who says (frequently used with the letter 'ו', but, at the beginning). See also א"ר

=== מ ===
- מיין דכורין, מ"ד (mad/mayin dechurin) - (Kabbalah) "masculine" waters, i.e. Heavenly action
- מ"ה (Mah) - (Kabbalah) a spelling-out of the Tetragrammaton numerically equal to 45, the gematria of מ"ה. (Usually appears as שם מ"ה)
- מאי טעמא, מ'ט (mai taema) - what is the reason [for...], what's the reasoning [of...]
- מהדורא קמא, מהדו"ק (mahadura kama) - "first edition," editio princeps
- מכל מקום, מ"מ (mikol makom) - in any case, lit. from any place
- ממלא כל עלמין, ממכ"ע (memaleh kol almin) - (Kabbalah) immanent in creation, lit. filling all worlds. See also סוכ"ע
- מיין נוקבין, מ"ן (man/mayin nukvin) - (Kabbalah) "feminine" waters, i.e. human action
- מצו(ו)ת עשה, מ"ע (mitzvot/mitzvat asei) - positive commandment, lit. commandment [to] do. See also רמ"ח

=== נ ===
- נביאים וכתובים, נ"ך (Nach) - the parts of the Tanakh aside from the Pentateuch, lit. "Prophets and Writings." See also תנ"ך
- 'נוקבא, נוק (nukva)- female, feminine
- 'נקרא, נק (nikra) - it/he is called

=== ס ===
- סובב כל עלמין, סוכ"ע (sovev kol almin) - (Kabbalah) transcending all creation, lit. surrounding all the worlds. See also ממכ"ע
- סטרא אחרא, סט"א (sitra achra) - (Kabbalah) the side of unholiness and the Kelipot, lit. the other side
- סוף סוף, סו"ס (sof sof) - ultimately, lit. end of end
- ספר תורה, ס"ת (Seifer Torah) - a Torah scroll, containing the Torah
- סלקא דעת, ס''ד (salqa daat) - lit. enter mind, i.e "if you'd think/you could think that [...]

=== ע ===
- על זה, ע"ז (al zeh) - on this, regarding this, above this
- על ידי, ע"י (al yedei) - because of, through agency of, lit. by the hand of
- עד כאן, ע"כ (ad kan) - until this point, lit. until here
- על כך, ע"כ (al kach) - thus, lit. [based] on this
- על כן, ע"כ (al kein) - therefore
- על כרחך, ע"כ (al karchach) - we are forced [to conclude], perforce, lit. on your compulsion
- 'עמוד, עמ (amud) - side, page, lit. column
- על פי, ע"פ (al pi) - according to, lit. by the mouth of
- עשרת ימי תשובה, עשי"ת (Aseret Yemei Teshuvah) - the Ten Days of Teshuvah

=== פ ===
- [x] 'פ ,[x] פרק (perek [x]) - chapter [x]. But, see פ"ק
- 'פרשת, פ (parshat) - the [Torah] portion of
- 'פירוש, פי (pirush) - which means, lit. [the] explanation [is]
- פסיק רישא, פס"ר (pesik reisha) - obvious conclusion, lit. [if] the head is separated, [is it not dead?]
- פרק קמא, פ"ק (perek kama) - in the first chapter. See [x] 'פ
- פירוש רש"י, פרש"י (pirush Rashi) - Rashi explains, Rashi's explanation

=== צ ===
- צריך להיות, צ"ל (tzarich lihiyot) - it should/must be (can be used to indicate a textual correction)
- צריך עיון, צ"ע (tzarich iyun) - [this] requires investigation. See also צע"ק
- צריך עיון קצת, צע"ק (tzarich iyun ketzat) - [this] requires a little investigation. See also צ"ע

=== ק ===
- קל וחומר, ק"ו (kal vachomer) - all the more so, at least as much so, lit. light and weighty. See also כ"ש
- קודשא בריך הוא, קוב"ה (Kudsha Brich Hu) - the Blessed Holy One
- קימלא לן, קי"ל (kaimla lan) - we have established, lit. established for us
- קריאת שמע, ק"ש (keriat shema) - reading of the Shema
- קא משמע לן, קמ"ל (qa mashma lan) - [the Gemara or the verse] teaches us

=== ר ===
- 'ראיה, ראי (raya) - proof
- ראש השנה, ר"ה (Rosh HaShanah) - the beginning of the year
- רבותינו זכרונם לברכה, רז"ל (Razal) - "Our Rabbis, of blessed memory," referring to Jewish sages of previous generations. See also חז"ל
- ראש חודש, ר"ח (Rosh Chodesh) - the beginning of the month
- רחמנא לצלן, ר"ל (Rachamana litzlan) - Heaven forbid, lit. may the Merciful One spare us
- רעיא מהימנא, ר"מ (Ra'aya Mehemna) - a commentary on the Zohar, lit. The Faithful Shepherd
- רמ"ח (remach) - 248, indicating either the 248 positive mitzvot or the 248 organs of the human body. See also תרי"ג and שס"ה
- רפ"ח (rapach) - (Kabbalah) 288, indicating the 288 sparks resulting from the Shattering of the Vessels of the world of Tohu

=== ש ===
- 'שנאמר, שנא (shene'emar) - as it says
- שס"ה (shesah) - 365, indicating either the 365 negative mitzvot, the 365 veins and sinews of the human body, or the 365 days of the solar year. See also תרי"ג and רמ"ח
- שמנה עשרה, ש"ע (Shemoneh Esrei) - (Liturgy) the amidah, or standing prayer, lit. [the order of] 18 [blessings]
- שליח ציבור, ש"ץ (shali'ach tzibur) - prayer leader, lit. emissary of the community
- שבת קודש, ש"ק (Shabat Kodesh) - the Holy Shabbat
- שקלא וטריא, שקו"ט (shakla vetarya) - (Talmud) discussion, give and take, lit. take and give
- שמע מינה, ש''מ (shema minah) - learn from it, take your conclusion of it/ conclude that [...]. Frequently used after a logical refutation or conclusion by a sage on a matter.

=== ת ===
- תורה שבכתב, תושב"כ (Torah SheBichtav) - the Written Torah. See also תושבע"פ and תנ"ח
- תורה שבעל פה, תושבע"פ (Torah SheBe'al Peh) the Oral Torah. See also תושב"כ
- תשבי יתרץ קושיות ואביות, תיק"ו (teiku, Tishbi yetareitz kushiyot ve'avayot) - it stands unresolved, lit. the Tishbite (Elijah the Prophet, in the time of the Moshiach) will answer questions and problems
- תורה נביאים וכתובים, תנ"ך (Tanakh) - the Bible, lit. "Torah [five books of Moses], Prophets and Writings." See also נ"ך
- תנא קמא, ת"ק (Tanna kama) - the first Tanna [mentioned]
- תרי"ג (taryag) - 613, usu. indicating the 613 mitzvot. Also used to indicate the 613 corresponding organs and veins of the human body. See also רמ"ח and שס"ה
- תקיעה תרועה תקיעה, תר"ת (tarat, tekiah teruah, tekiah) - a series of shofar blasts
- תקיעה שברים-תרועה תקיעה, תשר"ת (tashrat, tekiah, shevarim-teruah, tekiah) - a series of shofar blasts
- תקיעה שברים תקיעה, תש"ת (tashat, tekiah, shevarim, tekiah) - a series of shofar blasts
- תפילה של יד, תש"י (tefilah shel yad) - the arm tefillin
- תפילה של ראש, תש"ר (tefilah shel rosh) - the head tefillin
- תלמוד לומר, ת''ל (talmud lomar) - the Talmud says
- תנו רבנן, ת''ר (tannu rabbanan) - the Rabbis teach/ the Rabbis taught
- תא שמע, ת''ש (ta shema) - come and listen
