= Four Worlds =

Kabbalistic philosophical framework

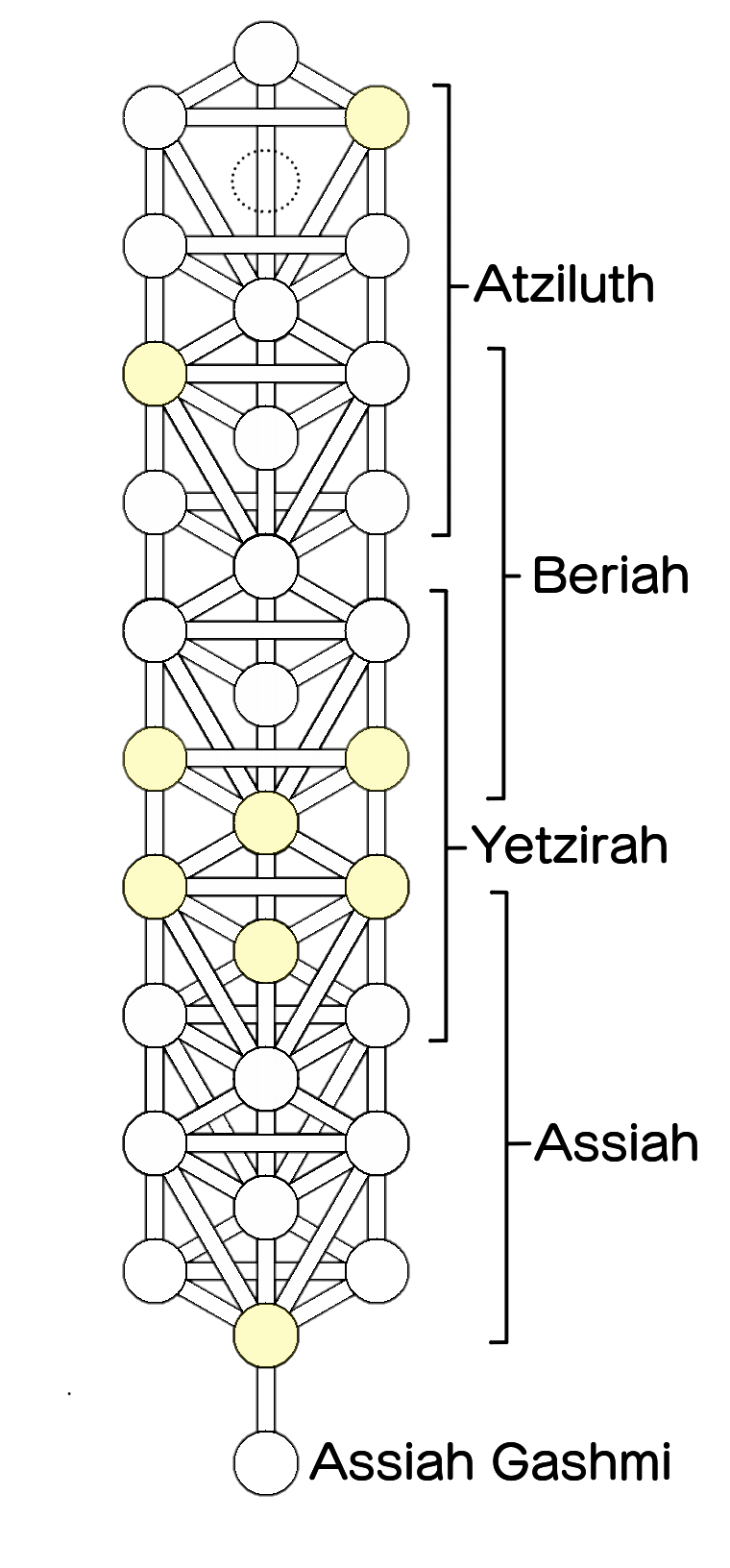
The Tree of Life expanded to show each sefirot within the Four Worlds, an arrangement nicknamed "Jacob's Ladder"

The Four Worlds (Hebrew: עולמות ʿOlāmot, singular: ʿOlām עולם), sometimes counted with a primordial world, Adam Kadmon, and called the Five Worlds, are the comprehensive categories of spiritual realms in Lurianic Kabbalah in a descending chain of existence.

The concept of "Worlds" denotes the emanation of creative lifeforce from the Ein Sof or Godhead through progressive, innumerable tzimtzumim or concealments. Kabbalists identified the names of these worlds from Isaiah 43:7, "All who are linked to My name, Whom I have created, Formed, and made for My glory (Biblical Hebrew: כֹּ֚ל הַנִּקְרָ֣א בִשְׁמִ֔י וְלִכְבוֹדִ֖י בְּרָאתִ֑יו יְצַרְתִּ֖יו אַף־עֲשִׂיתִֽיו׃, romanized: Kol hanniqrā b̲išmi wəlik̲b̲od̲i bərāt̲iw yəṣartiw ʾap̲-ʿăśit̲iw.)". In order of descent, the names of the worlds are Atziluth ("Emanation"), Beri'ah ("Creation"), Yetzirah ("Formation"), and Assiah ("Action"). Below the lowest spiritual world, Assiah, is the Assiah gashmi ("Physical Assiah"), or the physical universe which enclothes the last two sefirot, Yesod and Malkuth. Collectively, the Four Worlds are referred to as אבי״ע Aviyaʿ after their initial letters. In addition to the functional role each world has in the process of creation, they also embody dimensions of consciousness within human experience.

== Enumeration ==
The Worlds are formed by the Light (ohr) that fills all worlds that is the immanence. The ten sefirot "attributes" and their associated twelve partzufim or "personas" reflect this light in the Four Worlds, as do more specific Divine manifestations. In Lurianic Kabbalah, the partzufim interact dynamically, and sublime levels are clothed within lower existences, a concealed soul. Nonetheless, in each world, sefirot and partzufim predominate. The Five Worlds are, in descending order:

1. Adam Qadmon (Hebrew: אָדָם קַדְמוֹן, romanized: āḏām qaḏmon), the Cosmic Man. The anthropomorphic metaphor of Adam Qadmon denotes the Yosher "Upright" arrangement of the sefirot as the tree of life, which is then personified in the form of man, though not yet manifest. The pristine emanation of Adam Qadmon is still united with the Ein Sof. Adam Kadmon is the realm of Keter ʿElyon "Supernal Crown", lucid and luminous lights (צַחְצָחוֹת ṣaḥsaḥoṯ), the pure but concealed sefirot. Adam Qadmon is the divine light without vessels, the manifestation of the Divine plan for existence within Creation. In Lurianic Kabbalah, the chain of lights from Adam Qadmon precipitates the World of Chaos and The World of Rectification. As Keter is elevated above the sefirot, Adam Qadmon is supreme above the Worlds; therefore, it is generally not enumerated in the list of spiritual worlds.
2. Atziluth "Emanation" (אֲצִילוּת): The light of the Ein Sof radiates but is still united with its source. This supreme revelation precludes the souls and emanations in Atziluth from sensing or perceiving their existence. In Atziluth, the ten sefirot emerge in revelation, with Hokhma "Wisdom" dominating. In the context of Atziluth, the last sefira, Malkuth "Kingdom" represents the divine speech through which God created the universe in the first part of the Genesis creation narrative. It is through Malkuth that the lower worlds are sustained.
3. Beri'ah "Creation" (בְּרִיאָה (Note: alternatively בְּרִיָּה; "Archived copy" (PDF). Archived from the original (PDF) on 2010-07-29.) On this level is the first concept of creatio ex nihilo (Ayin and Yesh), but without yet shape or form. Beriah is the realm of the "Divine Throne", denoting the sefirot configuration of Atziluth descending into Beriah like a King on a Throne. The sefira Binah "Understanding" predominates.
4. Yetzirah "Formation" (יְצִירָה). On this level, created beings assume shape and form. The emotional sefirot, Chesed through Yesod, predominate. The souls and angels within Yetzirah worship through divine emotion and striving as they sense their distance from the Understanding of Beriah. This ascent and descent channel the divine vitality through the Worlds, furthering the divine purpose. Therefore, the main angels, such as the seraphim, are in Yetzirah, denoting their burning consummation in divine emotion.
5. Assiah "Action" (עֲשִׂיָּה): On this level, Creation is complete, differentiated and particular, as by this point the Divine vitality has undergone much concealment and diminution. However, it is still on a spiritual level. The angels of Assiah function on the active level, as the sefirah Malkuth (fulfilment in Kingship) predominates. Below spiritual Assiah is Assiah Gashmi (עֲשִׂיָה גַשׁמִי ʿăśiyā g̲ašmi "Physical Asiyah"), the final, lowest realm of existence, our material universe with all its creations. Much like the sefira Malkuth within Atziluth is the conduit by which the later worlds emanate, the final sefirot of Assiah is the point by which the physical universe derives.

== Meaning ==
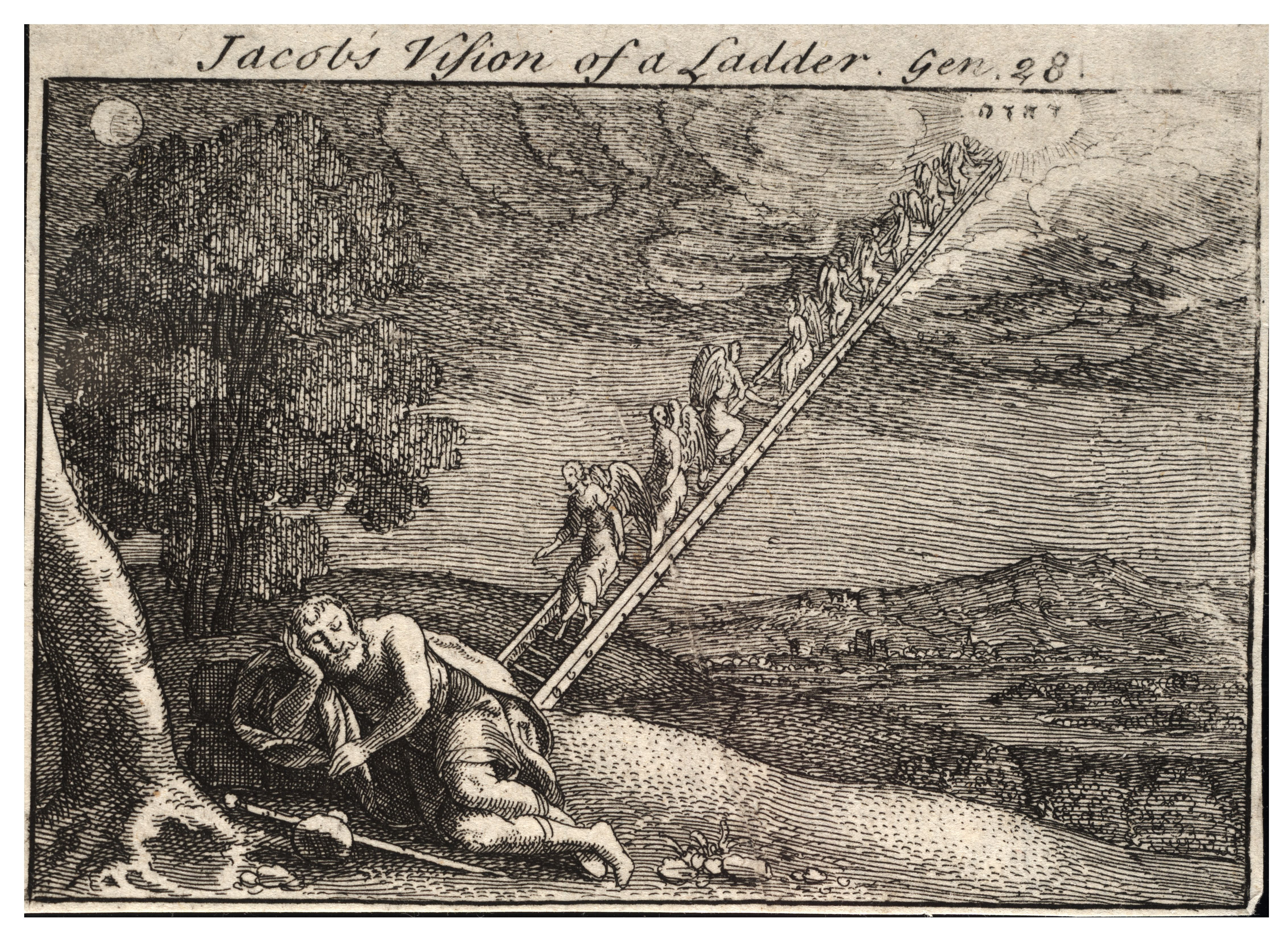
Jacob's vision in Genesis 28:12 of a ladder between Heaven and Earth. In Kabbalistic interpretation, the four main divisions of the ladder (sulam) are the Four Worlds; the angelic hierarchy embodies external dimensions of the lights/vessels, while souls embody inner dimensions.

The Four Worlds are spiritual, heavenly realms in a descending chain, although the lowest world of Assiah has both a spiritual and a physical aspect. The physical level of Assiah is our physical finite realm, including the cosmological Universe studied by science. Consequently, as Kabbalah becomes more of a metaphysical study, the terms "higher" and "lower" are used as metaphors for being closer or further from Divine consciousness, revelation, and emanance. The 16th-century systemisation of Kabbalah by Moses ben Jacob Cordovero brought the preceding interpretations and schools into their first complete rational synthesis. Subsequent doctrines of Kabbalah from Isaac Luria, describe an initial tzimtzum (withdrawal of the universal Divine consciousness that preceded Creation) to "allow room" for created beings on lower levels of consciousness. Lower levels of consciousness require the self-perception of independent existence, by the created beings on each level, to prevent their loss of identity before the magnificence of God. This illusion increases with more force in each subsequent descending realm. The number of graduations between the Infinite and the finite, is likewise infinite, and arises from innumerable, progressively strong concealments of the Divine light. Nonetheless, the four worlds represent fundamental categories of Divine consciousness from each other, which delineates their four descriptions. Consequently, each world also psychologically represents a spiritual rung of ascent in human consciousness, as it approaches the Divine.

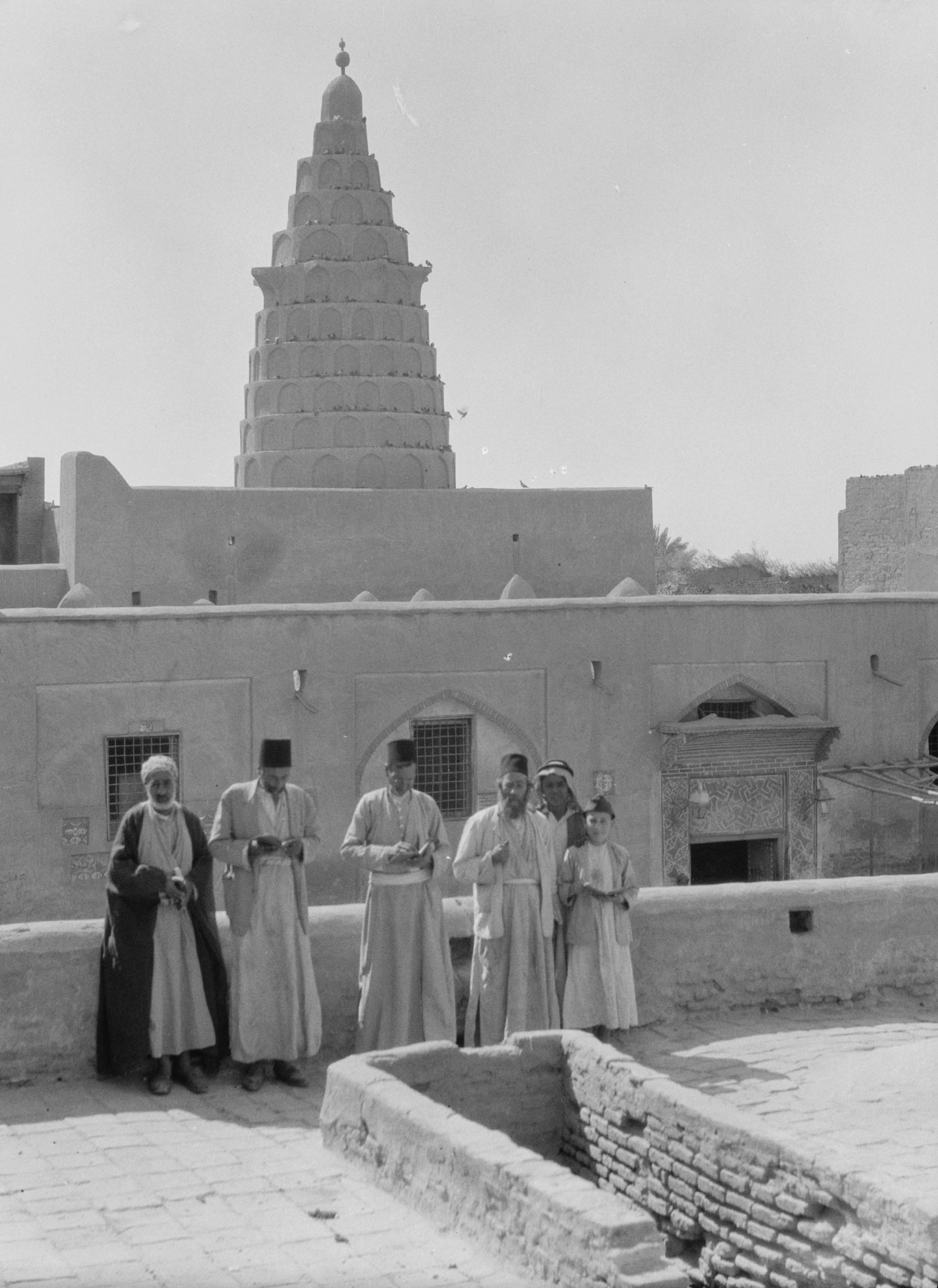
Ezekiel's Tomb in Iraq. Ezekiel's vision of the Divine Merkabah-Chariot, and Isaiah's vision of the Kisei HaKavod-Throne of Glory, are related in Kabbalah to beholding the Four Worlds from Yetzirah, and from Beriah

Kabbalah distinguishes between two types of Divine light that emanate through the 10 sefirot (Divine emanations) from the Infinite (Ein Sof), to create or affect reality. There is a continual flow of a "lower" light, the Mimalei Kol Olmin, the light of eminence that "fills all worlds" is the creating force in each descending world, that itself continually brings everything in that level of existence into being from nothing. It is this light that undergoes the various divine concealments and contractions as it descends downward to create the next level, and adapts itself to the capacity of each created being on each level. A transcendent higher light Sovev Kol Olmin, the light that "surrounds all worlds" would be the manifestation on a particular level of a higher light which is beyond the capacity of that realm to contain. This is ultimately rooted in the infinite light ("Ohr Ein Sof") that preceded Creation, the Tzimtzum and the Sephirot, rather than the source of the immanent light in the "Kav" (first emanation of creation after the Tzimtzum), in the teachings of Isaac Luria. Consequently, all the worlds are dependent for their continual existence on the flow of Divinity they constantly receive from the Divine Will to create them. Creation is continuous. The faculty of Divine Will is represented in the sefirot (10 Divine emanations) by the first, supra-conscious Sephirah of "Keter"-Crown, that transcends the lower 9 Sephirot of conscious intellect and emotion. Once the Divine Will is manifest, then it actualises Creation through Divine Intellect, and "subsequently" Divine Emotion, until it results in action. The reference to temporal cause and effect is itself a metaphor. The psychology of man also reflects the "Divine psychology" of the sefirot, as "Man is created in the image of God" (Genesis 1:27). In man the activation of willpower through intellect and emotion until deed, requires time and subsequent cause and effect. In the Divine Sephirot and their activation of Creation, this does not apply, as limitations only apply to Creation.

The Book of Job states that "from my flesh I see God". In Kabbalah and Hasidism this is understood to refer to the correspondence between the "Divine psychology" of the Four Worlds and the Sephirot, with human psychology and the Sephirot in the soul of man. From understanding the Kabbalistic description of the human soul, we can grasp the meaning of the Divine scheme. Ultimately, this is seen as the reason that God chose to emanate His Divinity through the 10 Sephirot, and chose to create the corresponding chain of four Worlds (called the "Seder hishtalshelus"-"order of development"). He could have chosen to bridge the infinite gap between the Ein Sof and our World by a leap of Divine decree. Instead the Sephirot and Four Worlds allow man to understand Divinity through Divine manifestation, by understanding himself. The verse in Genesis of this correspondence also describes the feminine half of Creation: (Genesis 1:27) "So God created man in His own image, in the image of God created He him, male and female created He them". Consequently, some of the sefirot are feminine, and the Shechina (immanent Divine presence) is seen as feminine. It is the intimate relationship between the Divine scheme of Four Worlds and man, that allows man's ascent more easily to Divine consciousness (see Dveikus).

== Explained in theosophical and anthroposophical terms ==
Rudolf Steiner was one of first occultists who managed to write and describe higher worlds due to his exact clairvoyance; however was not the only one who brought that to public eye.

He borrowed the terms from East, because such terms were never developed in western culture.

He spoke of

- etheric (elementary) world
- astral world
- Lower and Higher Devachan

There are even higher worlds but are not explained by Steiner, since either people aren't ready, and leaders of humanity and evolution have not let that happen.

Steiner explained how the evolution works both from macro, meso and microcosmical perspective, and how these are interlaped.

Beinsa Douno mentions causal world.

== Correspondences ==
World:	Descriptions:	Dominant Sephirah:	Letter of Tetragrammaton:	Level of soul:	Level of Torah-PaRDeS:	Other associations:
Adam Kadmon "Primordial Man"	Primary form of Kav; Above consciousness Sephirot concealed Latent potential Tetragrammatons; United with Ein Sof; Divine intent Pure light, no vessels	Keter-Crown; In relation to 4 Worlds; Inherent Will to Create; Revealed in Keter-Will of Atzilut	Apex atop י Yud; Above representation Alluded to by thorn	Yechidah-Singular; Essence of soul Unity with God	Sod Sh'b'Sod; Secret within Secret; Reflects Atzmut-Essence; Inner soul of Torah; Yechidah-source of Torah	Beyond all names Including all names Beyond good-bad polarity
Atziluth "Emanation/Nearness"	From Tohu to Tikun; Sephirot revealed First perception Unrestricted illumination Divine insight No self-awareness Nullification of Essence; Divine All	Chochmah-Wisdom; Source of intellect Partzuf of Abba-Father	י Yud; Dimensionless point First illumination-Male; Dot in the Palace	Chayah-Living; Encompassing soul Spiritual awareness	Sod-Secret; Kabbalah; Soul of Torah; Chayah-Wisdom of Torah	Concealed World with Beriah; Divine name ע״ב; Divine good Ayin-Nothingness; Torah scroll Ta'amim-Notes
Beri'ah "Creation"	Formless existence First self-awareness Parsah-Veil from Atzilut to Beriah; Divine Intellect; Nullification of Being; First sensed Creation; Divine Throne; Higher Garden of Eden	Binah-Understanding; Grasp of intellect Partzuf of Imma-Mother	Higher ה Hei; Dimensional expansion Vessel for intellect-Female; Palace	Neshamah-Breath; Divine intellect in soul Highest internalised potential Breath is internalised	Drush-Homiletic; Midrash; Neshamah-Understanding of Torah; Aggadah alludes to Kabbalah	Divine name ס״ג; Mostly good Little potential source of bad Thought garment Torah scroll Nekudot-Vowels
Yetzirah "Formation"	General existence Divine Emotions; Striving for ascent Awareness of distance Active self-nullification Archetypal forms Lower Garden of Eden	Midot-6 Emotions; Chesed to Yesod; Centred round Tiferet; Partzuf of Zeir Anpin-Son	ו Vav; Descending illumination Emotional revelation-Male; Reveals Da'at-Knowledge	Ruach-Spirit; Divine emotions in soul Potential internalised spirit Emotional movement	Remez-Hint; Ruach-Emotions of Torah; Soul of simple meaning Some Torah commentaries	Revealed World with Asiyah; Divine name מ״ה; Equal good-bad potential Speech garment Torah scroll Tagin-Crowns
Asiyah "Action"	Particular existence Divine action Concealment of God; 1 Asiyah Ruchni-Spiritual; Below it: 2 Asiyah Gashmi-Physical; Purpose of Creation	Malkuth-Kingship; Fulfilment in action Partzuf of Nukvah-Daughter; Shechinah-Divine Presence	Lower ה Hei; Dimensional expansion Vessel for emotions-Female; Nurtures action	Nefesh-Lifeforce; Vitality of actions Invested in body	Pshat-Simple; Nefesh-Physicality of Torah; Halachah and Torah narratives	Divine name ב״ן; Mostly bad-little good Action garment Torah scroll Otiyot-Letters

== See also ==
- Anthropomorphism in Kabbalah
- Hopi mythology § Four Worlds
- Masseket Azilut
- Mind–body problem
- Popper's three worlds
