= Pardes (exegesis) =

Kabbalistic theory of biblical exegesis

Pardes (Hebrew: פרד״ס) is a Kabbalistic theory of Biblical exegesis first advanced by Moses de León, adapting the popular "fourfold" method of medieval Christianity.

The term, sometimes also rendered PaRDeS, means "orchard" when taken literally, but is used in this context as a Hebrew acronym formed from the initials of the following four approaches:

- Peshat (פְּשָׁט) – "surface" ("straight") or the literal (direct) meaning.
- Remez (רֶמֶז) – "hints" or the deep (allegoric: hidden or symbolic) meaning beyond just the literal sense. In the version of the New Zohar, Re'iah.
- Derash (דְּרַשׁ) – from Hebrew darash: "inquire" ("seek") – the comparative (midrashic) meaning, as given through similar occurrences.
- Sod (סוֹד) – "secret" ("mystery") or the esoteric/mystical meaning, as given through inspiration or revelation.

Each type of Pardes interpretation examines the extended meaning of a text. As a general rule, the extended meaning never contradicts the base meaning. The Peshat means the plain or contextual meaning of the text. Remez is the allegorical meaning. Derash includes the metaphorical meaning, and Sod represents the hidden meaning. There is often considerable overlap, for example, when legal understandings of a verse are influenced by mystical interpretations or when a "hint" is determined by comparing a word with other instances of the same word.

Some books, such the Tolaat Yaakov of Meir ben Ezekiel ibn Gabbai, divide Pardes into Peshat, Remez, Din (law), and Sod. According to this understanding, Derash is divided into the homiletics (classified under Remez), and legal interpretations (classified under Din).

== History of the term ==
Pardes is a Biblical Hebrew word of Persian etymology, meaning "orchard" or "garden". In early rabbinic works, the "orchard" is used as a metaphor for divine secrets or Torah study.

Moses de León was the first to use Pardes as an acronym for these four methods of interpretation. In his responsa he writes, "[A]s I explained in my book which I called Pardes, (Note: This work is lost.) and the name Pardes by which I called it is a known concept that I disguised. The four approaches within its name are the 'four which entered into the orchard,' i.e. peshat and remez and derasha and sod," while a slightly different version appears twice in the New Zohar: "The pardes of the bible is a compound of peshata and re'ia and derasha and sod." The original printings of the Zohar contain a slightly different version, possibly from before de Leon thought of the mnemonic: "In the words of the bible are its peshata and derasha and remez and gematriyot and razzin.

== Context ==
=== Exoteric and esoteric in Sod ===
- Exoteric means that Scripture is read in the context of the physical world, human orientation, and human notions. The first three exegetical methods: Peshat-Simple, Remez-Hinted, and Drush-Homiletic belong to the exoteric "Nigleh-Revealed" part of Torah embodied in mainstream Rabbinic literature, such as the Talmud, Midrash, and exoteric-type Jewish commentaries on the Bible.
- Esoteric means that the surface meaning of Scripture, as with esoteric texts in general, while it may also be true, is not the real truth to which Scripture refers. Instead, the surface meaning hides/covers/conceals its real intention. The real truth is the secret hidden within the deceptive covering. The fourth level of exegesis, Sod-Secret, belongs to the esoteric "Nistar-Hidden" interpretations of Scripture found alternatively in Jewish mysticism-Kabbalah or in Jewish philosophy-Metaphysics. Religious adherents of Kabbalah and of Rationalism fought over their alternative claims to know the esoteric meaning. In Medieval Jewish Rationalism, the hidden truth within Scripture was human-centred Divine transcendence philosophical depths. In Kabbalistic mysticism, it was God's Persona-centred Divine immanence emanations. Therefore, each tradition interpreted classic Rabbinic references to Pardes (legend), Maaseh Bereishit/Maaseh Merkabah (Talmudic passages about esotericism) and to the connected 4-fold structure of PaRDeS exegesis differently.

Both mystical and rational religious Judaism, however, together rooted in mainstream Rabbinic literature and Mitzvot observance, accepted common truth in Peshat, Remez, and Drush levels of Judaism. In this way, Jewish religious esotericism is inseparable from exoteric Judaism. Their esoteric meanings did not deny the truth of exotericism, but rather reinforced the need for exoteric Halacha Jewish law and practical observance of the 613 Mitzvot as God's plan in Creation.

The mystical view of esoteric Sod-Secret as the elite doctrines of Kabbalah also gave conceptual context to Peshat, Remez, and Drush: in the mystical unfolding of the spiritual Four Worlds, each realm corresponds to a level in PaRDeS. God's immanence is found at successively descending levels of reality. Torah descends from on High, while man ascends the levels of PaRDeS exegesis in Torah from Below. In this sense, ascending the four levels of interpretation reveals greater divinity in Torah; the exoteric and esoteric are linked in a continuous chain. While rationalists metaphorically read Rabbinic Aggadah legends, kabbalists read them as allusions to Kabbalah.

=== Halacha and Aggadah in Peshat, Remez, Drush ===
Within mainstream exoteric classic Rabbinic literature, such as the Talmud and Midrashim, Halacha is Jewish legal discussion and ruling, while Aggadah is Jewish theological/narrative discussion. As two approaches in exoteric Judaism, the Peshat-Simple, Remez-Hinted, and Drush-Homiletic exegesis methods, which work exoterically, can be used in either Halachic or Aggadic contexts.

== Examples ==
=== Peshat ===
==== In Genesis 1:1 ====
Genesis 1:1 is often translated as "In the beginning God created the heavens and the earth." However, Rashi comments, "If you come to interpret it according to its peshat, interpret it thus: In the beginning of creation of heavens and earth." According to Rashi's linguistic analysis, the word "bereishit" does not mean "In the beginning", but rather "In the beginning of..."

=== Remez ===
==== In Genesis 1:1 - commandments ====
The first word of Genesis 1:1 is "Bereishit" ("in the beginning [of]"). According to the Vilna Gaon, all 613 commandments are hinted to in this word. For example, the Vilna Gaon says, the commandment of pidyon haben is hinted via the phrase "Ben Rishon Acharei Shloshim Yom Tifdeh" ("a first son, after 30 days should be redeemed"), and the acronym of the first letters of this phrase is "Breishit".

==== In Genesis 1:1 - eschatology ====
In Jewish thought, the Year 6000 idea relates the 6 days of Creation (followed by the Sabbath) to 6000 years the world is expected to exist (before a 1000-year messianic era). The first 2000 "hidden" years began at Creation and lasted until Abraham. The next 2000 years "of revelation" include Israelite Patriarchs, the Giving of the Torah at Sinai, and the two Temples in Jerusalem. The final 2000 years, of preparation for the Jewish Messiah, are balanced between Divine concealment and revelation.

Genesis 1:1 is said to hint to this idea. The verse contains seven (Hebrew) words, and each of the words except Hashamayim ("Heavens") contains the letter Aleph (the first letter of the Hebrew alphabet, with a gematria value of 1). The name "Aleph" hints at its etymological variants "Aluph" ("Chief/Ruler", representing the one God) and "Eleph" ("One Thousand", representing 1,000 years). Hebrew word roots generally contain three consonant letters. Of the six words in the verse containing Aleph: in the first two Aleph is positioned as third letter (concealed God in the first 2,000 years), in the next two Aleph is positioned as first letter (revealed God in the middle 2,000 years), in the last two Aleph is positioned as second letter (balance between concealed and revealed God in the last 2,000 years).

==== Laws of witnesses ====
In the following exchange, the Talmud differentiates between explicit and hinted sources for the laws of conspiring witnesses (edim zomemim):

- Ulla says: From where in the Torah is a hint of the law of conspiring witnesses?
- Why should such a hint exist? For it is stated explicitly "You do to them what they conspired to do to the accused."!
- Rather, from where in the Torah is a hint that conspiring witnesses receive a whipping [if they cannot be punished by doing to them as they conspired]?
- As it says, "They shall vindicate the righteous one and convict the evil one. And if the evil one is deserving of lashes..." Should [the fact] that they "vindicate the righteous one" [automatically mean] "they convict the evil one, and if the evil one is deserving of lashes"? [In many cases, vindicating the righteous party of a dispute does not mean that the evil party receives lashes.] Rather, [these verses are talking about a case where] witnesses convicted the righteous one, and other witnesses came and vindicated the original righteous one, and made [the first set of witnesses] into evil ones; [in that case], "if the evil one is deserving of lashes".

=== Derash (Midrash) ===
==== In Genesis 1:1 ====
Rashi comments that the Hebrew word Bereishit ("In the beginning") can be homiletically understood to mean "Due to the first", where "first" (reishit) is a word used elsewhere to refer to the Torah and to the Jewish people. Thus, one may say that the world was created for the sake of Torah and the Jewish people.

==== The number of mitzvot ====
Rabbi Simlai deduced that the Torah's commandments are 613 in number. Deuteronomy 33:4 states that "Moses commanded us the Torah". The gematria of "Torah" is 611. Adding to them the first two of the Ten Commandments (which were given to the Jews not via Moses but rather directly by God, which is known because only these two commandments are written in the first person singular), the total is 613.

=== Sod ===
==== In Maimonides ====
In Guide for the Perplexed, Maimonides declares his intention to conceal from the average reader his explanations of Sod. Later on in the book, Maimonides mentions Divine secrets within Torah:

"Adam and Eve were at first created as one being, having their backs united: they were then separated, and one half was removed and brought before Adam as Eve." Note how clearly it has been stated that Adam and Eve were two in some respects, and yet they remained one, according to the words, "Bone of my bones, and flesh of my flesh" (Gen. ii. 23). The unity of the two is proved by the fact that both have the same name, for she is called ishah (woman), because she was taken out of ish (man), also by the words, "And shall cleave unto his wife, and they shall be one flesh" (ii. 24). How great is the ignorance of those who do not see that all this necessarily includes some [other] idea [besides the literal meaning of the words].

Adam and Eve are "one over other", i.e. thorax of Adam was the "interconnection" of the thorax of Eve, "opposite and up-down together in unity-viceversa"... and this was before their "perfect realization".

Consider how Originary Adam was created double-faced, nape to nape, [both] equivalent in potentia and in actu, truly one [...] From one they became two, but although they are two, they are one. As it says, 'they shall become one flesh' (Gen 2:24), and he always strives for her and she always strives for him

— Isaac ben Samuel of Acre

Eve was literally the paradigma of earth while male is cleaving of supernal World; Eve gives the sin because she thinks to have power over all world and considering spirituality far from the humanity. So also Adam "separated the fruit physically and in thought": the Bereshit Rabbah teaches that wine is the fruit of knowledge... Shabbat is the highest day of Creation and this day is the connection and unity between God and the Jew: Kiddush is the sanctification about which the spiritual salvation can be lived as messianic taste before the final redemption, that is the tikkun of messianic era.

==== In Kabbalah ====
Kabbalah does not read Scripture as analogy, but as theosophical symbols of dynamic processes in the Supernal Divinity. According to this, Creation was enacted through the letters of the Hebrew language, particularly Divine Names. The Midrash describes God "looking into the Torah to Create the World", which Kabbalah extended into a linguistic mysticism. United with the Infinite Divine, the text of the Torah becomes one long Name of God, or alternatively, God's revealed Being as represented in this World. Kabbalists endeavoured to perceive the unlimited Divinity in the Torah of the Tree of life, through the exoteric Torah of the Tree of Knowledge, the two representing transcendent and immanent revelations of God in the Sephirot, uniting Tiferet ("The Holy One Blessed Be He") and Malkuth (Feminine Shekhinah).

The teachings of Isaac Luria, which form the basis of modern esoteric Kabbalah, read the mythological doctrine of Shevirat HaKeilim ("Shattering of the vessels in God's Persona) from the account of the Edomite Kings of Genesis 36:31 and I Chronicles 1:43:

"These are the kings who reigned in the land of Edom before there reigned any king over the children of Israel..."

In Kabbalah, based on exoteric Midrash, the Hebrew Patriarchs: Abraham, Isaac and Jacob, embody the sephirot of Chesed-Kindness, Gevurah-Strength and Tiferet-Beauty. Kindness and Judgement are polar forces and Beauty harmonises. The imbalances emerged in Ishmael and Esau, while the harmony fathered the 12 tribes of Israel. Ishmael and Esau are considered the spiritual roots of the Nations, deriving from the initial unrectified spiritual Realm of Tohu-Chaos, whose pristine Divine potential was too high to be contained in Existence, shattering its vessels which fell down into exile. The Israelites relate to the lower Realm of Tikun-Rectification. The Messianic Era for all people will embody both advantages of the high lights of Tohu in the rectified vessels of Tikun, when "all Nations will ascend the mountain of God". Edom, the progeny of Esau, corresponds to unrectified Gevurah-Strength, the waste of which vitalises the kelipot shells. Gevurah is the constricting force in Creation, allowing independent Existence, but also causing the initial vessels of Tohu to act independently and shatter. The Edomite Kings who reigned before any king in Israel, while also being historical people according to Peshat, in Kabbalah both embody and symbolise the vessels of Tohu that shattered. The verses name eight kings, the breakages in the eight emotional sephirot from Daat to Malchut. Death is the lights-souls reascending and the vessel fragments falling, animated by remnant sparks of light. Of the eighth king, only Genesis says he died, as Malchut remained partially intact. The sparks of holiness animate Creation down to Material Existence. In the highest World Atziluth, the general root-sparks number 288, read out by gematria from Genesis 1:2–3:

And the Earth was chaos and void (the World of Tohu), with darkness upon the face of the deep. And the Spirit of God hovered (מרחפת-"Merachepet", the sparks animating the fragments externally) over the face of the waters. And God said, Let there be light..(the World of Tikun, allowing stable reception of Divine revelation)

"Merachepet" divides into 288 (רפח) sparks animating within the מת-"dead"-fallen fragments.

== Association with paradise ==
The Pardes system is often regarded as mystically linked to the word pardes (Hebrew: פָּרְדֵּס), meaning orchard. "Pardes" is etymologically related to the English word "paradise", and the Quranic Firdaus (Arabic: فِردَوس) among various other forms, in that they all share a common origin in an Old Iranian root, attested in the Avestan language as pairi.daêza-. It occurs only three times in the Tanakh. In the first of these passages it means "garden"; in the second and third, "park." In the apocalypses and in the Talmud, the word is used of the Garden of Eden and its heavenly prototype. From this usage, comes Christianity's denotation of Paradise as the abode of the blessed.

== Pardes and other Jewish interpretive approaches ==
=== Pardes and Chabad exegesis ===
In a discourse, Menachem Mendel Schneerson, the Lubavitch Rebbe, asks where Hasidic thought fits in with Pardes exegesis. Habad is an intellectualist school in Hasidic Judaism, translating the mystical faith of General-Hasidism and the movement's founder into an intellectual Habad articulation. The works of the last Habad leader focus on uniting the different aspects of traditional Jewish thought, exoteric and esoteric, through the Habad explanation. The four levels of Pardes in Kabbalah articulate the Four spiritual Worlds and the four soul levels in Action, Emotion, Understanding and Wisdom. In the discourse he describes General-Hasidism relating through faith to the essence of the soul, the Torah, and God (Hasidic focus on Divine Omnipresence perceived by the soul's essence). In esoteric Kabbalistic terminology this relates to the fifth (highest) primary World of Adam Kadmon, and the above-conscious fifth (highest) soul level of Will (internal aspect: soul-root "Delight"), called in Kabbalah "Yehida-Unity". He describes Habad thought articulating in intellectual grasp the essence-fifth level of Torah exegesis, Hasidut-Yehida not listed above the four levels of PaRDeS because as essence it is not limited to a particular form. Peshat, Remez, Drush and Sod are constrained by their limited disciplines: from Peshat describing material perception to Sod-Kabbalah limited to the esoteric supernal emanations of God. As essence, Hasidic thought, investigated intellectually in Habad, both transcends all four levels of Pardes in its own exegetical explanation, and permeates within the four. Yechida-Essence is revealed through the four levels of Pardes, but not constrained by them. The particular exegeses of PaRDeS become connected together in light of the Hasidic exegesis. In this way, the discourse describes Kabbalah, which gains psychological understanding through Hasidism, being actually a limited esoteric commentary on Hasidism's Yehida-Essence. Kabbalah remains transcendent, while Hasidic thought emphasizes action, as the Atzmut essence of God receives its true revelation in the materiality of creation, the omnipresent divinity related in Hasidic thought.

=== Pardes and modern exegesis ===
The Pardes exegesis system flows from traditional belief in the text as Divine revelation; Mosaic authorship in regard to the Torah, prophetic inspirations in the rest of Tanakh, and belief in Oral Torah transmission. Modern Jewish denominations differ over the validity of applying modern historical-critical exegetical methods to Scripture. Haredi Judaism regards the Oral Torah texts as revelation, and can apply Pardes method to read classic Rabbinic literature. Modern Orthodox Judaism is open to historical critical study of Rabbinic literature and some application to the later Biblical canon. Additionally, some Modern Orthodox scholars have looked at Biblical Criticism on the Torah, incorporating some of its views within traditional belief in Mosaic revelation.

Beginning with Samuel David Luzzatto in the nineteenth century, there has been an approach to understanding the Torah that finds statements in classical Jewish commentaries on the Bible that would allow acceptance of revelation, and still use Lower Criticism. Comments of Rashbam, Ibn Ezra, Ibn Caspi, Judah Ha-Hasid, and Abravenel have been used in this historical-philological form of Peshat.

In the 20th century, the Conservative Judaism philosopher-theologian Abraham Joshua Heschel, while accepting modern scholarship, saw existentialist revelation and Divine encounter as the foundation of legitimate Bible interpretation. His 1962 masterwork, Torah min HaShamayim BeAspaklariya shel HaDorot (English: Torah from Heaven in the Light of the Generations) is a study of classical rabbinic theology and aggadah (spiritual thought), as opposed to halakha (Jewish law) in revealing the Divinity of Torah study. It explores the views of the Rabbis in the Talmud, Midrash and among the philosophical and mystical traditions, about the nature of Torah, the revelation of God to mankind, prophecy, and the ways that Jews have used scriptural exegesis to expand and understand these core Jewish texts in a living, fluid spiritual exegesis.

== Similar concepts in other religions ==
The Pardes typology has some similarities to the contemporary Christian fourfold allegorical scheme.

== See also ==
- Pardes (legend)
- Pesher
- Jewish commentaries on the Bible
- Rabbinic literature
- Talmudical hermeneutics
- Midrash
- Kabbalah
- Four Worlds
- Jewish mystical exegesis
- Allegory in the Middle Ages
- Principle of charity
