= Da'at =

Location where all ten sefirot in the Tree of Life are united as one

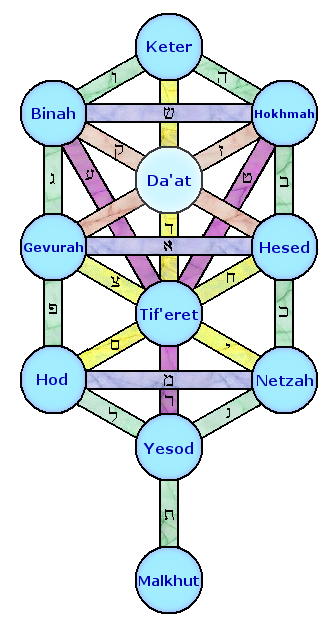
The Sefirot in Kabbalah
The Sefiroth in Jewish Kabbalah
View the image description page for this diagram	The Tree of Life

In the branch of Jewish mysticism known as Kabbalah, Daʻat or Da'ath (Hebrew: דַּעַת, romanized: Daʿaṯ, in pausa: דָּעַת Dāʿaṯ, lit. 'knowledge') is the location (the mystical state) where all ten sefirot in the Tree of Life are united as one.

In Daʻat, all sefirot exist in their perfected state of infinite sharing. The three sefirot of the left column that would receive and conceal the Divine light, instead share and reveal it. Since all sefirot radiate infinitely self-giving Divine Light, it is no longer possible to distinguish one sefira from another; thus they are one.

Daʻat is not always depicted in representations of the sefirot; and could be abstractly considered an "empty slot" into which the germ of any other sefirot can be placed. Properly, the Divine Light is always shining, but not all humans can see it.

The revelation or the concealment of the Divine Light shining through Daʻat does not happen only in Daʻat itself. It can appear by a human perspective also within the worldly affairs (Malkuth). The perception of the Divine Light shining can clearly occur also in Malkuth, all the times that humans become self-giving (Altruism). However, humans who remain selfish (Selfishness) cannot see it, and for them its benefits seem "hidden".

== As a representative sefirah ==
Properly, Daʻat is not a sefirah, but rather is all ten sefirot united as one. Nevertheless, Daʻat is sometimes counted as a sefirah instead of Keter, from the perspective of finite creation, using Daʻat to represent the "reflection of" (the "inner dimension" of) the infinity of Keter. Thus Daʻat appears in the configuration of the sefirot along the middle axis, directly beneath Keter. It corresponds to the image of God. Alternate countings of the sefirot produce 10 powers ("10 and not 9, 10 and not 11" - Sefer Yetzirah) by either including Keter or Daʻat. In the scheme of Moses ben Jacob Cordovero, Daʻat is omitted, while in the scheme of Isaac Luria, Keter (Will) is omitted. Cordovero describes the sefirot as one light in ten vessels. Luria follows this, but lists sefirot beginning with Chokmah (Wisdom) to describe their outer dimensions.

== As spiritual state ==
The kochos hanefesh "spiritual state" corresponding to the sefirah of Daʻat is yichud ("unification").

== As aspect of intellect ==
According to the Tanya, Daʻat is the third and hidden more special unconscious power of intellect. But in this context, it is actually the divine aspect of Daʻat to the partzuf of Zeir Anpin (connection directly to the upper Daʻat of Adam Kadmon).

Zer Anpin refers to the 'personification' (partzuf) of six sefirot from Chesed to Yesod - and as a whole embodies its own ten sefirot and its own Daʻat. Zer Anpin personifies the revelation of the Torah and relates to the second level of the human soul called "spirit" (ruach), that corresponds to mental aspects, including reason and emotion.

Accordingly, Daʻat is associated in the soul with the powers of memory and concentration, powers that rely upon one's "recognition" (hakarah) of, and "sensitivity to" (hergesh), the potential meaningfulness of those ideas generated in consciousness through the powers of Chokmah and Binah "understanding".

== Levels ==
Daʻat operates on two levels. The higher level, referred to as Daʻat Elyon ("higher knowledge") or Daʻat hane'elam ("the hidden knowledge"), serves to secure the continuous bond between the two higher powers of intellect -- chokmah and Binah, wisdom and understanding. This is Daʻat within Keter.

The lower level, referred to as Daʻat Tachton ("lower knowledge") or Daʻat hamitpashet ("extending knowledge"), serves to connect the intellect as a whole with the realm of emotion; thereby enhancing one's determination and resolve to act in accordance with the essential truths that one has integrated into consciousness. This is Daʻat as the third power of the intellect.

=== Lower level ===
Of this level of Daʻat it is said (Book of Proverbs 24:4): "And by knowledge shall the chambers be filled with all precious and pleasant riches." "The rooms" are the chambers of the heart, the emotions of the soul (as alluded to by the word cheder, "room," which is an acronym for chesed din rachamim, the three primary emotions of the soul). The inner consciousness of Daʻat fills these rooms and enlivens them as does the soul to the body.

In the Zohar, this level of Daʻat is referred to as "the key that includes six." The "key" of Daʻat opens all six chambers (attributes) of the heart and fills them with life-force. Each of these six chambers, when filled with Daʻat, is referred to as a particular dei'ah ("attitude," from the root of Daʻat) of the soul.

Daʻat corresponds with the interstitium in the human body. In the brain, Daʻat is represented by the claustrum. Though their form is seemingly separate and dissimilar, their function is fairly similar.

Daas/Daat Elyon ("Higher Knowledge") and Daas/Daat Tachton ("Lower Knowledge") are two alternative levels of perception of reality in Hasidic thought. Their terms derive from the Kabbalistic sephirot: Keter (above conscious Will) and Da'at (conscious Knowledge), considered two levels of the same unifying principle; the first encompassing, the second internalised within the person. In Kabbalah either Keter or Da'at are listed in the 10 sephirot, but not both. While the significance of this duality is limited in Kabbalah to its discussion of the Heavenly realms, the significance, and the terminology of "Higher" and "Lower Knowledge" emerges in the Hasidic internalisation of Kabbalah to describe alternative, paradoxical conscious perceptions of Divine Panentheism in this material World. Upper Knowledge refers to the Divine view "from Above", Lower Knowledge to the Created view "from Below".

=== Description ===
The terms Daas Elyon and Tachton are used particularly in the Habad philosophical systemisation of Hasidic thought. The alternative Kabbalistic terms Ayin and Yesh ("Non-Being and Being") are more commonly used in wider Hasidic mysticism. Habad differed from Mainstream Hasidism by its intellectual investigation of the Kabbalistic terminology and concepts that Hasidism had adapted to its psychologically focused mysticism. In this Daas Elyon and Tachton take on a related, but wider conceptual connotation than Ayin and Yesh, as they become the two alternative conscious perception paradigms of all Hasidic mysticism. Hasidism had extended the significance of Ayin and Yesh beyond its Heavenly abstract Kabbalistic meaning, to describe how this physical realm is alternatively Being or Non-Being, as perceived by Creation, in its nullification in the Panentheistic Divine All. Higher and Lower Knowledge broadens this further to any spiritual level of existence, or any concept under consideration.

In historical Kabbalah, Keter ("Crown") is the transcendent Divine Will above conscious internalisation, while Da'at ("Knowledge") is the internalised aspect of the same principle, channeling the Creative Ohr lifeforce into existence. Consequently, Keter is the "Hidden Knowledge", that becomes revealed in Da'at. Moshe Cordovero lists Keter as the first sephirah and excludes Da'at, while Isaac Luria excludes Keter as being too transcendent to consider as the first cause of Creation, while substituting Da'at instead. Where Keter is the hidden soul root of the intellectual sephirot, Da'at is the hidden soul root of the emotions that emerge subsequently. Keter is revealed in Intellect, and Da'at is revealed in Emotions.

Hasidic thought adapted Kabbalistic terminology to its own concern with direct psychological perception in deveikut cleaving to God. It related the sephirot to their corresponding parallels in the Kochos hanefesh (soul powers) devotional experience in Man. Similarly Da'at Elyon and Tachton emerge as the two alternative perspectives of Creation, the Divine consciousness "from Above", and the Created consciousness "from Below". While Hasidic thought universally retains the Kabbalistic meaning of Ayin (Non-Being) to refer to the inaccessible grasp of the Infinite Divine from the Creation's perspective, and Yesh (Being) to refer to Creation's perception of its own existence, this ascription only reflects the Lower Knowledge view. From the Divine view of Higher Knowledge, in truth only God exists, who is the Yesh Amity ("True Being"). Creation is nullified into acosmic non-existence (Ayin) within its Divine source, "as the light of the sun is nullified within the sun's orb". Nonetheless, as Hasidic mysticism describes man's devotion to God, it still uses the terms Ayin and Yesh in their Lower Knowledge, traditional Kabbalistic reference, and not reversed.

=== Examples ===
Yichudah Ilaah ("Higher Unity") and Yichudah Tataah ("Lower Unity"), the two levels of perceiving God's Monotheism. This alternative paradox is explained in the second section of the Tanya, reflecting the author's most metaphorical interpretation of the Lurianic Tzimtzum, tending to Acosmic Monism. See Divine Unity in Hasidism.

... It seems to the lower worlds as if the light and lifeforce of the Omnipresent, blessed be He...were something apart from His blessed Self ... Yet in regard to the Holy One, blessed be He, there is no tzimtzum, concealment and occultation that would conceal and hide before Him ... for the tzimtzumim and garments are not things distinct from His blessed Self, heaven forefend, but (Genesis Rabba 21:5) "like the snail whose garment is part of its very self"

Higher and Lower Da'at relates to the Upper and Lower Chokmah (Wisdom), the first of the three intellectual sephirot. The Zohar predicts, based on its interpretation of the upper and lower waters of Noah's flood (rains from above, wellsprings from below), that in the sixth century of the Hebrew sixth millennium (corresponding to the secular years 1740-1840) Wisdom will flood the World in preparation for the Messianic era. In the Likkutei Sichos talks of the Lubavitcher Rebbe, he relates this prediction to the Higher Wisdom of Hasidic thought (called the Baal Shem Tov's "Wellsprings") and the Lower Wisdom of secular Science and thought. In Kabbalah the two levels of Water/Wisdom correspond to the Higher and Lower Waters in the account of Creation in Genesis I.

In Kabbalah's interpretation of the Tetragrammaton name of God, the first two letters are the "Concealed World" of Divine Intellect, corresponding to Atziluth and Beri'ah in the Four Worlds, and the last two letters are the "Revealed World" of Divine Emotions, corresponding to Yetzirah and Assiah. In the first section of Tanya, the Talmudic directive to bless God for misfortune as well as fortune is related to misfortune stemming from the higher hidden realms. In its source, the misfortune descends from a blessing too high to descend in revelation, as "no evil descends from above".

The Tetragrammaton and Elokim Divine Names in Kabbalah correspond to infinite transcendent encompassing light and finite immanent filling light. In Genesis chapter 1 Creation takes place through Elokim, while in Genesis 2 through both names. In Hasidic interpretation the essential Tetragrammaton Divine Infinitude enacts creation Something from Nothing, but shines through the concealment of Elokim to allow Creation to seem independent from God. In this Elokim becomes the means for revelation, as a Creation directly through the Tetragrammaton would be nullified. This corresponds to two levels of Bittul (Nullification): Bittul HaMetzius ("Nullification of Essence") and Bittul HaYesh ("Nullification of Ego"). As the highest of the Four Worlds Atziluth is still emanation, before perceived Creation, relatively it reflects Essential Nullification. In comparison to the lower two Worlds, also Beri'ah has some relation to Higher Bittul through the enclothement of Wisdom (Atziluth) descending into Understanding (Beriah). Prophecy is explained in Kabbalah to be the letters of Creation in Atziluth, as they descend into Beriah. This means Divine transcendent insight descending into some understanding. Similarly, Beriah is described in Kabbalah as the realm of the Divine "Throne", as the full emanated Divinity of Atziluth cloths itself through descent in Beriah, metaphorically as if descending onto a throne, to govern lower creation from above as a King.

== See also ==
- Abyss – Concept from Thelemic mysticism
- Atzmus – Divine essence in Kabbalah
- Divine providence – Orthodox Judaism's view(s) on providence

== Works cited ==
- Ben-Shlomo, Joshua (2005). The Mystical Theology of Moses Cordovero. Suny Press.
- Cordovero, Moses (1592). Pardes Rimonim. The Brandeis Library.
- Elior, Rachel (1993). The Paradoxical Ascent to God: The Kabbalistic Theosophy of Habad Hasidism. Suny Press.
- Elior, Rachel (2006). The Mystical Origins of Hasidism. Littman Library of Jewish Civilization.
- Fine, Lawrence (2003). Physician of the Soul, Healer of the Cosmos: Isaac Luria and His Kabbalistic Fellowship. Stanford University Press.
- Gikatilla, Joseph (1964). Sha'arei Orah. Hebrew University.
- Green, Arthur (2004). A Guide to the Zohar. Stanford University Press.
- Idel, Moshe (1988). Kabbalah: New Perspectives. Yale University Press.
- Kaplan, Aryeh (1990). Innerspace: Introduction to Kabbalah, Meditation and Prophecy. Ktav.
- Kraemer, David (1990). The Mind of the Talmud: An Intellectual History of the Bavli. Oxford University Press.
- Laitman, Michael (2005). The Kabbalah Experience. Zohar.
- Luria, Isaac (1573). Etz Chaim. Zalman Shazar.
- Matt, Daniel C. (1995). The Essential Kabbalah: The Heart of Jewish Mysticism. HarperOne.
- Moskowitz, Eva (2000). The Power of Kabbalah. Red Wheel/Weiser.
- Schneerson, Menachem M. (1973). Likkutei Sichos. Kehot Publication Society.
- Schneerson, Menachem M. (1986). On the Essence of Chasidus. Kehot Publication Society.
- Schneur Zalman, of Liadi (1796). Tanya. Kehot Publication Society.
- Scholem, Gershom (1965). On the Kabbalah and Its Symbolism. Schocken.
- Scholem, Gershom (1974). Kabbalah. Meridian.
- Silberstein, Laurence (1994). The Other in Jewish Thought and History. New York University Press.
- Vital, Chaim (1997). Shaar HaGilgulim. Mosad Harav Kook.
- Vital, Chaim (1997b). Shaar HaNevuah. Mosad Harav Kook.
- Wolfson, Elliot R. (1997). Through a Speculum That Shines: Vision and Imagination in Medieval Jewish Mysticism. Princeton University Press.
