= Kochos hanefesh =

Innate constituent character-aspects within the soul, in Hasidism

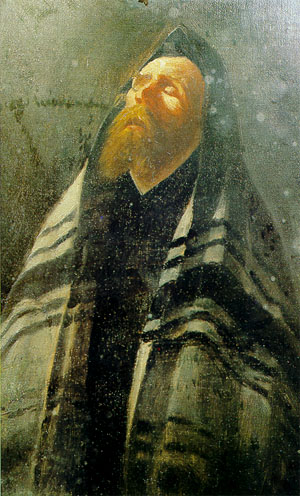
Hasidic thought explores the role of the Sephirot, Divine emanations of Kabbalah, in the internal experience of spiritual psychology

Kochos/Kochot haNefesh (Hebrew: כוחות הנפש from nephesh-"soul"), meaning "Powers of the Soul", are the innate constituent character-aspects within the soul, in Hasidic thought's psychological internalisation of Kabbalah. They derive from the 10 Sephirot Heavenly emanations of Kabbalah, by relating each quality to its parallel internal motivation in man. The Hasidic discussion of the sephirot, particularly in the Kabbalistically oriented system of Habad thought, focuses principally on the Soul Powers, the experience of the sephirot in Jewish worship.

Among the soul powers, Bittul (Human "self-nullification" of ego), the first revealed power, turns the Ani-"Self" into Ayin-"Nothingness" in the contemplative preparation for experiencing the Divine "Ayin" nullification of Existence. In the elite ideal of Deveikut-"cleaving" to God, the central Hasidic principle in its reinterpretation of Judaism, this inspires the subsequent powers of expression. In Mainstream "Practical Tzadikism", this elite dimension is reserved for the Hasidic leader, with popularised deveikut devotion found instead in the emotional sanctification of life. The Essential Soul Powers are revealed in spiritual Mesirat Nefesh-"Self Sacrifice" in devotional fulfilment through action. Hasidic emphasis on Divine Omnipresence sees the essential Divine purpose embodied only in action, its ultimate mystical stress on action.

== Description ==
Each of the 10 Sephirot Divine emanations of Kabbalah comprises both an external "functional" characteristic, and an inner motivational principle. Kabbalah studies the role of the sephirot in the emanated spiritual Worlds of Creation. As the soul of man is "created in the image of God" (Genesis 1:27), understood in Kabbalah to connote the partzuf-"configuration" of the sephirot in the Man-metaphor Yosher-"upright" inter-relationship, so the sephirot also describe the soul of man. Jewish spirituality experiences both the external and internal characteristics of the sephirot in serving God, their internal characteristics becoming the innate "soul powers" in man, defined and focused on in Hasidic thought's psychologisation of Kabbalah.

The terminology of the Kochos hanefesh is defined in Habad systemisation of Hasidic thought as the following experience-powers of the soul:

Sephirah: Outer function in Divinity and soul	Inner experience: Inner motivation in Divinity, expressed in human Soul Powers
Keter-Crown above consciousness "Three Heads (levels) in Keter":	Essence of Keter: Unconscious unity of Emunah-Faith (Etzem essence of soul in Atzmus God's essence) Inner Keter: Unconscious source of Taanug-Delight (transcendent soul rooted in delight) Outer Keter: Unconscious transcendent Ratzon-Will (transcendent soul expresses through will)
Chochma-Wisdom insight	Bittul-Selflessness (Conscious illumination inspires self nullification)
Binah-Understanding concept	Simchah-Joy (Understanding awakens joy)
Daat-Knowledge of idea	Yichud-Union (Union with idea awakens emotions)
Chesed-Kindness expansion	Ahavah-Love of God and Divine in all things (Response of Divine giving)
Gevurah-Restriction/Might	Yirah-Fear (Awe) of God (Mystical awe of Divinity)
Tiferet-Beautiful harmony	Rachamim-Mercy/Compassion (Balances kindness with restriction)
Netzach-Victory/Eternity	Bitachon-Confidence (Confidence inspires determination)
Hod-Splendour/Thanksgiving	Temimut-Sincerity/Earnestness (Sincere response to Divine Glory)
Yesod-Foundation connection	Emet-Truth (Desire for expressing higher powers truth in action)
Malchut-Kingship action	Shiflut-Lowliness (Action through receiving higher Sephirot lights)

=== Soul levels, Powers-Kochos and Garments-Levushim ===
The soul's sephirot expressions and their inner Soul Powers, while psychologically felt from the revealed conscious level of Chochmah downward, are only revealed outwardly through their enclothement in the three Levushim-"garments" of the soul: Machshavah-Thought, Dibbur-Speech and Maaseh-Action. As the sephirot are all inter-included as sub-categories within each other, Chochmah, Binah and Daat (the Mochin-Intellects), are enclothed in Thought as a soul to a body. Similarly, the emotional sephirot of Chesed to Malchut (the Middot-Emotions), are revealed through Malchut in Speech and Action.

In Kabbalah and Hasidism, the soul has five levels, whose names derive from five Midrashic terms for the soul. Consequently, the generic Hasidic adjective "Kochos HaNefesh"-Powers of the Soul accurately relate more specifically to different levels amongst the five soul levels. The five levels in Kabbalah correspond to the Sephirot:

- Yechidah-Singular Etzem-essence of soul is expressed through transcendent Keter-Crown
- Chayah-Living transcendent soul is expressed through encompassing Chochmah-Wisdom that mediates between unconscious Keter and the first conscious, unlimited revelation of insight
- Neshamah-Soul first invested soul level expresses Binah-Understanding, the developed intellectual faculties
- Ruach-Spirit emotional level of invested soul expresses Chesed-Kindness to Yesod-Foundation, the emotional faculties (in Lurianic Parzufim of Kabbalah these form one unit, as do each of the five corresponding levels in the Sephirot)
- Nefesh-Lifeforce enlivening invested soul in the body expresses Malchut-Kingship, the resulting revelation into action of all higher levels, faculties and powers of the soul

== Kochot HaEtzem-Essential Powers of the soul ==
The two powers in the soul's Keter-Crown: Ratzon-Will and Taanug-Delight are termed Kochot HaEtzem-Essential Powers of the soul, as they transcend the invested soul in the body, as Makif-Encompassing lights, still above consciousness. They affect the subsequent Revealed Pnimi-Internalised Soul Powers as the soul's supernal root. Here Etzem-essential power is used relative to the Revealed Powers, as the singular essence of the soul is beyond expression as Delight, united with the Divine Atzmus essence. In Kabbalah the supernal soul is also termed its Mazal, related to the "downward" channeling of illumination into consciousness. The quality of Faith reflects the Etzem-essential singular point of the soul, beyond the essential powers of Will and Delight.

Above-conscious Delight, still beyond awareness, shapes subsequent emotional inclinations, as it is rooted in the essential soul. Regarding it, Sefer Yetzirah 2:2 says, "There is none higher than delight". Hasidic thought elaborates that "regarding a (true) desire, no questions can be asked", as if there were reasons for the desire, then it would not be a true Taanug above intellect. Delight shapes Will, the outer manifestation of Delight, as Will can intend for external objectives to be fulfilled in the process of realising the true Delight. Keter-Will in Kabbalistic description of Heavenly emanations corresponds to the highest World of Adam Kadmon-"Primordial Man", the first Partzuf-configuration in Lurianic Kabbalah. The term Adam Kadmon denotes ordered system ("Adam"-the "Yosher" Upright arrangement of the Sephirot in Kabbalah) and primary cause in Creation ("Kadmon"-"First" emanation in enacting Creation). Similarly in the soul, Ratzon-Will denotes the primary power of Will on all subsequent revealed soul powers, "Nothing can obstruct will".

=== Mesirat Nefesh-self sacrifice and Mitzvot-Jewish observances in Hasidism ===
The nature of the Essential Soul Powers becomes revealed in Mesirat Nefesh-Self Sacrifice. In Jewish law self sacrifice connotes particular circumstances that require giving up one's life rather than transgress rare prohibitions. In Hasidism, "Mesirat Nefesh" here connotes a different definition of daily spiritual devotion beyond the call of ordinary Jewish observance, rather than Halachic martydom of life. Such devoted, transcendent exertion in fulfilling a mitzvah beyond ordinary requirements, is centrally stressed in Hasidic thought. In the classic Rabbinic (Ethics of the Fathers) the traditional Jewish honorific "Hasid" (pious), which was later adopted by the modern Hasidic movement, is characterised as a person who goes beyond the letter of the law. In Hasidic mysticism, the inspiration of deveikut cleaving to God seeks expression in such added devotional conduct. This reveals the essential soul, above intellect, because logical rationalisations to limit oneself to regular requirements are transcended.

One classic, traditional division in Judaism of the 613 Mitzvot observances is into three groups:

- Hukim-Statutes that transcend human logical reason, but observed as decrees of the King. These include the ritual commandments of Kosher food, and the paradigmatic Red Heifer, considered the ultimate example of Hok. In Kabbalah, metaphysical explanations for the Hukim are given, such as the redemption of sparks of holiness in food, however, the categorisation of kosher and non-kosher species for this purpose, while often symbolic, still remains ultimately decreed
- Eidos-Witnesses that would have no prior human requirement, but are given by God as remembrances of historical events in Israelite spiritual history. This commemoration enables ethical self transformation through re-ennacting the formative Jewish events. These include the rituals of Passover to commemorate the spiritual journey out of Egypt, and Tefillin to inculcate awareness of God's unity into the mind and heart. In Kabbalah, too, metaphysical reasons are given
- Mishpatim-Judgements ethical codes that any human society could enact. These include prohibitions in the Ten Commandments. In esoteric Kabbalah, they have deeper meanings also, but these deepen the simple meaning. Mishpatim raise the classic question of why they need to be codified if they are logical, to which the Talmud includes the reason that Mitzvot fulfilled under obligation are higher than Mitzvot chosen voluntarily. This answer is developed in Jewish mysticism, that only a command of the King could connect finite Man with the Infinite Ein Sof. Through the commandment, holiness can descend and physicality can rise, the ethical choice becoming a holy act.

Talmudic, Midrashic, Philosophical and Kabbalistic thought give their own, particular reasons for Mitzvot, according to their level of explanation in the four-fold Pardes system of explanation. Hasidic thought can involve extensive treatment of Kabbalah, while drawing in the other levels of explanation. In its treatment of Kabbalistic reasons for the Mitzvot, Hasidism deepens and elucidates the Kabbalistic texts through human analogies and psychological correspondences in man's experience. However, within its thought, Hasidism extols an ultimate advantage of Hukim as an aspect in all three categories of Mitzvot. The Baal Shem Tov related the Hebrew word Mitzvah-commandment to the Aramaic Tzavsah-connection. The advantage of Hukim is the transcendent bond above intellect they engender. Similarly, Eidos and Mishpatim are permeated with Divinity through being followed ultimately because they are decrees of the King. Their difference lies in God's desire that they should also descend into human intellect, the advantage they possess that the Divine decree within them can also, and becomes deepened, by uniting more fully with the mind.

== Iskafia-subjugation and Es'hapcha-transformation in Deveikut-cleaving to God ==
In Jewish observance, Hasidism develops the Kabbalistic scheme of redeeming the "sparks of holiness" in material existence, to its central religious value of deveikut cleaving to God. This turned deveikut into the starting point of worship in daily life, rather than the culmination of meditative seclusion. Through deveikut involvement in materiality, Hasidism advocated each person elevating the particular share of sparks allocated to them by Divine providence. In Hasidic teaching there are two forms of this redemption of holiness from Kelipot impurity, whose terms derive from Kabbalah. In Iskafia-subjugation, the level for the ordinary person, holiness is freed from its exile by suppression of human inclinations in the service of mitzvot. Es'hapcha-transformation, the task of the elite Tzadik, is able to turn impurity into holiness, dark into light. In both cases, teaches the Kabbalistic Zohar, "The Light that Encompasses Worlds shines into all Realms" in reciprocal Divine response. These Kabbalistic notions become related to popular deveikut and mesirat-nefesh devotion for each person in Hasidism, particularly amidst material life. In Hasidism, this mystical task of sanctification amidst materialism is termed Hislabshus-Involvement/Enclothement (from levush-garment parallel to the garments of the soul), engaging with the world with mindful awareness of its Divine element. Refraining from the "completely impure" Kelipot is termed Dechiya-pushing aside, where the holy spark within is exiled beyond the mundane, and becomes redeemed externally through disengagement.

== See also ==
- Sephirot
- Deveikut
- Atzmus
- Ayin and Yesh
