= Abba Amona =

Abba Amona (Father, Mother) also known as Chokma (wisdom) and Binah (insight) is the names of the two higher sephiroth Kabbalistic mythological figures of the Judaic people. The duo are the divine couple vaunted in Kabbalah. The term translates to "Father-Mother".
