= Masseket Azilut =

Anonymous kabalistic work from the early 14th century

Massekhet Azilut (Hebrew: מסכת אצילות, romanized: māsekheth ʾəṣiluth, lit. 'Tractate of Atzilut') is an anonymous kabalistic work from the early 14th century. It is the earliest literary product of speculative Kabbala that contains the doctrine of the Four Worlds, a doctrine not contained in the Zohar, as well as that of the concentration of the Divine Being. The Messekhet Atzilut opens with the following passage:

Eliyahu opened, it is written, "The secret of God is for those who fear Him". (Psalms 25:14) This verse refers to the idea that even if a Jew learns Mishnah, Gemara and yet has no awe—for naught does he splash in the great waters [of Kabbala], he toils entirely for nothing. Every one who fears God should actively pursue the hidden aspects [of Torah], which are the essence of wisdom and knowledge, "God's glory is a hidden thing". (Proverbs 25:2) When will you make glory for God? When you are occupied in the hidden aspects of Torah.

== Dating ==
The form in which the rudiments of kabbala are presented here, as well as the emphasis laid on keeping the doctrine secret and on the compulsory piety of the learners, is evidence of the early date of the work. At the time when Masseket Aẓilut was written kabbala had not yet become a subject of general study, but was still confined to a few of the elect. The treatment is on the whole the same as that found in the mystical writings of the time of the Geonim, with which the work has much in common; hence, according to the Jewish Encyclopedia (1901) there is no reason for not regarding it as a product of that time. In contrast, Gershom Scholem considered it a 14th-century work.

The doctrines of Metatron, and of angelology especially, are identical with those of the Geonim, and the idea of the sefirot is presented so simply and unphilosophically that one is hardly justified in assuming that it was influenced directly by any philosophical system.

The book places Metatron and the angels centered around him in the world of Yetzirah rather than Beri'ah, as later became the case. Beginning with Isaac of Acre and the Massekhet Atzilut, the Hebrew letter Yod (י) has been associated with the World of Atzilut, Heh (ה) with Beri'ah, Vau (ו) with Yetzirah, and the final Heh with Assiah, thus spelling out the name of God, YHWH, in terms of the four worlds.
