= Daath =

Daath may refer to:

- Da'at, a mystical state in Kabbalah
- Dååth, an American death metal band
