= Atziluth =

Highest of four worlds in Kabbalah

Atziluth or Atzilut (also Olam Atsiluth, עוֹלָם אֲצִילוּת, literally "the World of Emanation") is the highest of four worlds in which exists the Kabbalistic Tree of Life. It is also known as "near to God." Beri'ah follows it. It is known as the World of Emanations, or the World of Causes. In Lurianic Kabbalah, each of the Sephiroth in this world is associated with a name of God, and it is associated with the suit of wands in the tarot.

== Significance ==
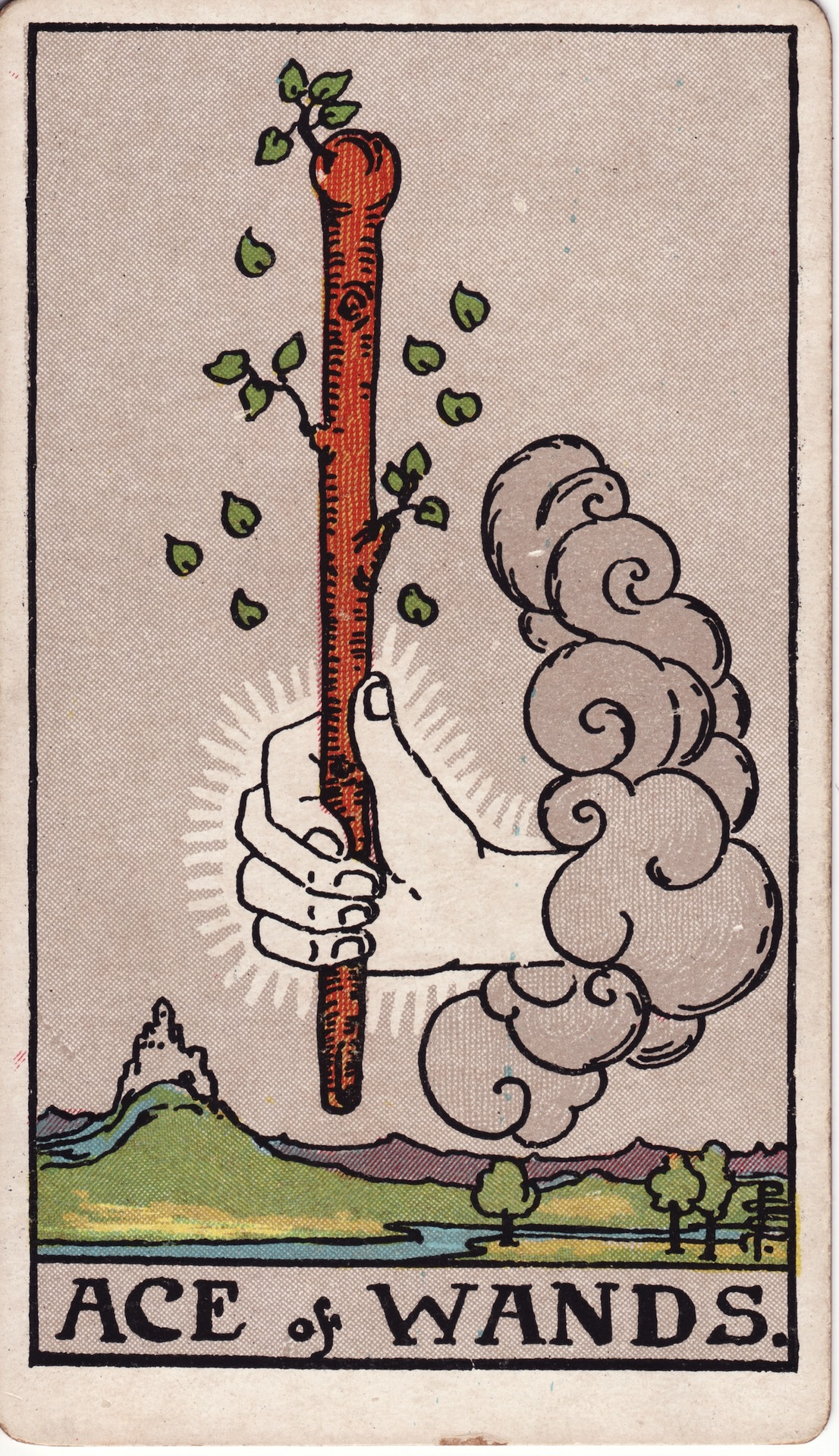
Ace of Wands from the Rider–Waite Tarot, associated with Atziluth in Western esotericism

Atziluth is the realm of pure divinity. The four worlds of Kabbalah relate to the kabbalistic tree of life in two primary ways:

- the entire Tree of Life is contained in each of the four worlds; in this manner, they are described as one on top of another and in symbolic form by a diagram called Jacob's Ladder.
- The Tree of Life can be subdivided into four horizontal sections, each representing one of the four worlds.

In Kabbalah, each of the ten sefirot of the Tree of Life also contains a whole tree inside itself. The realm of Atziluth is thus related to the top three sefirot of the Tree of Life; these three spheres of Keter, Hokhma and Bina are considered to be wholly spiritual in nature and are separated from the rest of the tree by a region of reality called the Abyss.

== Origins ==
The word is derived from "atzal" in Ezekiel 42:6. It was taken into Kabbalah via Solomon ibn Gabirol's Meqor Ḥayyim "Fountain of Life", which was much used by Kabbalists. The theory of emanation, conceived as a free act of the will of God, endeavors to surmount the difficulties that attach to the idea of creation in its relation to God. These difficulties are threefold:

1. The act of creation involves a change in the unchangeable being of God;
2. It is incomprehensible how an infinite and perfect being could have produced such imperfect and finite beings;
3. A creatio ex nihilo is difficult to imagine.

The simile used for the emanation is either the soaked sponge that emits spontaneously the water it has absorbed, or the gushing spring that overflows, or the sunlight that sends forth its rays—parts of its own essence—everywhere, without losing any portion, however infinitesimal, of its being. Since it was the last-named simile that chiefly occupied and influenced the Kabbalistic writers, Atziluth must properly be taken to mean "eradiation"; compare Zohar, Exodus Yitro, 86b).

Atziluth assumed a more specific meaning, influenced no doubt by the little work Masseket Azilut "Mask of Nobility". For the first time, the four worlds are distinguished: Atziluth, Beriah, Yetzirah, and Assiah. But here too they are transferred to the region of spirits and angels:

- In Atzilah, the Shekhinah alone rules
- In Beriah are the throne of God and the souls of the just under the dominion of the Angel of the Presence
- In the Yetzira are the creatures of Ezekiel 1 and the ten classes of angels ruled over by Metatron
- In the Assiah are the Ophanim, and the angels that combat evil, governed by Sandalphon.

In the Zohar, Atziluth is taken to be simply God's direct emanation, in contradistinction to the other emanations derived from the sefirot. No fourfold world is mentioned.

Moses Cordovero and Isaac Luria were the first to introduce the fourfold world as an essential principle into Kabbalistic speculation. According to this doctrine,

- the Atzila represents the ten sefirot;
- the Beria, the throne of God, emanating from the light of the sefirot;
- the Yezira, the ten classes of angels, forming the halls for the sefirot;
- the Assiah, the different heavens and the material world.

In contradistinction to the Atzila, which constitutes the domain of the Sephirot, the three other worlds are called by the general name Pirud. Later Kabbalists explain Atziluth as meaning "excellence," so that according to them the Atzilah-world would mean the most excellent or highest world.

== Correspondences ==
- The letter yud י in the Tetragrammaton
- The sefirah of Chochmah and hence the partzuf of Abba
- The element of Fire
- The soul-level of Chayah
- The brain (Patach Eliyahu)
- The Shemoneh Esrei in the Shacharit prayer service
- In the allegory of the teacher and the student, the first stage where the teacher has a flash of inspiration, or an unexpanded concept that he wishes to give to the student
- The fixed, fire, sign of Leo (astrology)
- Within the Western mystery tradition; the classical element of fire and the suit of wands (or batons) in divinitory Tarot
