= Yetzirah =

Third of four worlds in the Kabbalistic Tree of Life

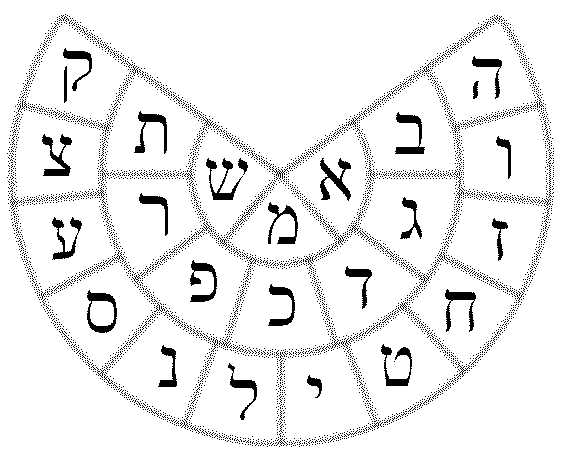
Yetzirah wheel

Yetzirah (also known as Olam Yetsirah, עוֹלָם יְצִירָה in Hebrew) is the third of four worlds in the Kabbalistic Tree of Life, following Atziluth and Beri'ah and preceding Assiah. It is known as the "World of Formation".

"Yetzirah" as in "formation" is as opposed to "Beriah" as in "creation": actually taking whatever matter that was created in "Beriah" and shaping it into the basic elements.

== Correspondences ==
On the Tree of Life diagram Yetzirah is associated with the sefirot Chesed, Gevurah, Tiferet, Netzach, Hod and Yesod. Together, these six sefirot are known as the Microprosopus (Zeir Anpin) also known as the 'Lesser Countenance' or the 'Small Face.' In this sense, it stands in contrast with the Macroprosopus (Arich Anpin).

The moment of formation, when the creations' form becomes apparent, corresponds to the world of Yetzirah. The external state of consciousness in the World of Formation is called ״half good and half evil.״ The "half evil" refers to the self-consciousness of the beings of this world. The "half good" refers to the emotional sensitivity of one to the other as expressed in the genuine desire to make the other happy. This external dimension of Yetzirah is the seat of heated emotion, of “hotheadedness.”

A more internal dimension of Yetzirah—based on the awareness that the true battleground between good and evil is within us—is the emotional imperative to pit the good inclination against the evil inclination. But in order for our good inclination to be victorious over our evil inclination, it must first be empowered by an input of Divine light and energy. God gives us this input in the merit of our first devoting ourselves to do good for our fellows.

The consciousness of the world of Yetzirah is that of communing with God, speaking to Him directly in prayer or indirectly through the study of His Torah and taking counsel with a true Torah sage. The perspective of the world of Yetzirah as a state of consciousness is based on general notions. At this level, particular definitions are not apparent. The sense of selfhood that is apparent at this level of consciousness can only be grasped in impersonal language.

Non-permanent angels dwell in the world of Yetzirah, unlike archangels which reside in Briah.

In addition, Yetzirah corresponds to:

- The letter vav (ו) in the Tetragrammaton
- The sefirot of Chesed, Gevurah, Tiferet, Netzach, Hod and Yesod and hence the partzuf of Zeir Anpin
- The element of Water
- The soul-level of ruach
- The soul-garment of speech
- The emotions
- The arms, torso, legs, and circumcision (Patach Eliyahu)
- In the allegory of the teacher and the student, the penultimate stage where the teacher gives a lesson, a compressed outline of the full concept to the student. Through this, the student gains an initial, external understanding of the concept.
- The Pesukei Dezimra in the Shacharit prayer service
- Within the Western mystery tradition; the classical element of air and the suit of swords in divinitory Tarot.
