= Camelthorn =

Camelthorn or camel thorn is a common name for several plants and may refer to:

- Vachellia erioloba, a tree native to southern Africa
- Alhagi, a genus of shrubs native to northern Africa and Asia Minor, with some species naturalized in other parts of the world
