= Qlippoth =

Impure spiritual forces in Kabbalah

In the Zohar, Lurianic Kabbalah, and Hermetic Qabalah, the qlippoth (Hebrew: קְלִיפּוֹת, romanized: qəlippōṯ, lit. "peels", "shells", or "husks", sing. קְלִפָּה qəlippā; originally, Jewish Babylonian Aramaic: קְלִיפִּין, romanized: qəlippin) are the representation of evil or impure spiritual forces in Jewish mysticism, the opposites of the sefirot. The realm of evil is called Sitra Achra (Jewish Babylonian Aramaic: סִטְרָא אַחְרָא, romanized: siṭrā ʾaḥrā, lit. 'the Other Side') in Kabbalistic texts.

== In the Zohar ==
The qlippoth are first mentioned in the Zohar, where they are described as being created by God to function as a 'nutshell' for holiness. The text subsequently relays an esoteric interpretation of the text of Genesis creation narrative in Genesis 1:14, which describes God creating the moon and sun to act as "luminaries" in the sky. The verse "Let there be luminaries (מְאֹרֹת məʾoroṯ)," uses a defective spelling of the Hebrew plural form for "luminous body, light source" (מְאוֹרוֹת), resulting in a written form identical to the Hebrew word for "curses." In the context of the Zohar, interpreting the verse as calling the moon and sun "curses" is given mystic significance, personified by a description of the moon descending into the realm of Beri'ah, where it began to belittle itself and dim its light, both physically and spiritually. The resulting darkness gave birth to the qlippoth. Reflecting this, they are thenceforth generally synonymous with "darkness" itself.

Later, the Zohar gives specific names to some of the qlippoth, relaying them as counterparts to certain sefirot: Mashhith (Hebrew: מַשְׁחִית, romanized: mašḥīṯ, lit. 'destroyer') to Chesed; Af (Hebrew: אַף, romanized: ʾap̄, lit. 'anger') to Gevurah; and Hema (Hebrew: חֵמָה, romanized: ḥēmā, lit. 'wrath') to Tiferet. It also names Avon (Hebrew: עָוֹן, romanized: ʿāvon, lit. 'iniquity'), Tohu (Hebrew: תֹהוּ, romanized: tohu, lit. 'formless'), Bohu (Hebrew: בֹהוּ, romanized: bohu, lit. 'void'), Esh (Hebrew: אֵשׁ, romanized: ʿēš, lit. 'fire'), and Tehom (Hebrew: תְּהוֹם, romanized: təhom, lit. 'deep'), but does not relate them to any corresponding sefirot. Although the Zohar clarifies that each sefira and qelippa has a one-to-one match, even with equivalent partzufim, it does not give all their names.

== In Hermetic Qabalah ==
=== Mathers' interpretation ===
Christian Knorr von Rosenroth's Latin Kabbala denudata (1684) (translated The Kabbalah Unveiled by Samuel Liddell MacGregor Mathers) equates these forces with the Kings of Edom and also offers the suggestion they are the result of an imbalance towards Gedulah, the Pillar of Mercy or the merciful aspect of God, and have since been destroyed. In subsequent Hermetic teachings, the qlippoth have tended, much like the sefiroth, to be interpreted as mystical worlds or entities, and merged with ideas derived from demonology.

In most descriptions, there are seven divisions of Hell:

1. Sheol or Tehom "the Deeps"
2. Abaddon "Doom" or Tzoah Rotachat "Boiling excrement"
3. 'Well of Corruption בְּאֵר שַׁחַת or Mashhith "destroyer"
4. Cistern of Noise (בּוֹר שָׁאוֹן) or "Sticky Mud/Filth" (Hebrew: טִיט הַיָוֵן)
5. Silence or Gates of Death (שַׁעֲרֵי מָוֶת)
6. Oblivion (Hebrew: נְשִׁיָּה) or Shadow of Death (צַלְמָוֶת)
7. Lowest Earth (אֶרֶץ תַּחְתִּית)

There are also twelve qlippothic orders of demons, three powers before Satan, and twenty-two demons which correspond to the 22 letters of the Hebrew alphabet.

=== The Golden Dawn and Aleister Crowley ===
In the late 19th century, The Hermetic Order of the Golden Dawn began teaching about the qlippoth in relation to the sephiroth. Much of the orders material was stolen and republished by Israel Regardie as the book "The Golden Dawn", and the table of magical correspondences by Aleister Crowley as the book 777.

Regardie and Crowley list the qlippoth and their associated sephiroth on the tree of life as:

Qlippah	Description given by Golden Dawn and Crowley, resp.	Sefirah
Thaumiel	"The two contending Forces" / "Dual Contending Forces"	Keter
Ghogiel	"The Hinderers" / "Hinderers"	Chokmah
Satariel	"The Concealers" / "Concealers"	Binah
Agshekeloh	"The Breakers in Pieces" / "Breakers in Pieces"	Chesed
Golohab	"The Burners" / "Burners"	Gevurah
Tagiriron	"The Disputers" / "Disputers"	Tiferet
Gharab Tzerek	"The Ravens of Death" / "Dispersing Ravens"	Netzach
Samael	"The Liar or Poison of God" / "Deceivers"	Hod
Gamaliel	"The Obscene Ones" / "Obscene Ones"	Yesod
Lilith	"Queen of the Night and of Demons" / "The Evil Woman or (simply) The Woman"	Malkuth

=== Kenneth Grant ===
Kenneth Grant, founder of the Typhonian Order, taught about the qlippoth. Grant emphasized the importance of understanding and integrating these darker aspects for a holistic spiritual perspective. In Nightside of Eden, Grant adds to the structure defined by the Golden Dawn and Aleister Crowley, and explores the "Tunnels of Set", pathways corresponding to the Qlippothic Tree. These tunnels symbolize hidden paths filled with transformative energies beneath the surface of consciousness. Traversing these tunnels involves confronting and integrating darker aspects of the psyche and the universe, which Grant views as crucial. Grant advocated for balancing light and dark forces, believing that engaging with Qlippothic energies can lead to spiritual growth. He linked the Qlippoth to sex magic and Tantric practices, as primal energies for transformation. Grant suggested that H. P. Lovecraft's description of Yog-Sothoth as a conglomeration of "malignant globes" may have been inspired by the Qlippoth, part of his view that Qlippothic forces are integral to ancient and contemporary esoteric thought.

== See also ==
- Fallen angel
- Tohu and Tikun
- Yetzer hara

== Bibliography ==
- Asprem, E. (2013). Arguing with Angels: Enochian Magic and Modern Occulture. State University of New York Press. ISBN 978-1-4384-4190-0.
- Boustan, Ra'anan S.; Reed, Annette Yoshiko, eds. (2004). Heavenly Realms and Earthly Realities in Late Antique Religions. Cambridge University Press. ISBN 978-1139453981.
- Butler, Alison (2011). Victorian Occultism and the Making of Modern Magic: Invoking Tradition. Palgrave Macmillan. ISBN 978-0-230-29470-7.
- Crowley, Aleister (1986). 777 and Other Qabalistic Writings of Aleister Crowley. Weiser Books. ISBN 0-87728-670-1.
- Drury, Nevill (1989). The Occult Experience: Magic in the Modern World. Prism Press.
- Franck, Adolphe (1926). "Relation of the Kabbalah to Christianity". The Kabbalah: Or, The Religious Philosophy of the Hebrews. Translated by I. Sossnitz. New York: Kabbalah Publishing Company.
- Fries, Jan (2012). Nightshades: A Tourist Guide to the Nightside. Oxford: Mandrake of Oxford. ISBN 978-1906958459.
- Grant, Kenneth (1977). Nightside of Eden. London: Frederick Muller Limited. ISBN 0-584-10206-2.
- Grant, Kenneth (1991). The Magical Revival. Skoob Books Publishing.
- Harms, Daniel; Gonce, John Wisdom (1998). The Necronomicon Files. York Beach, Maine: Red Wheel/Weiser. ISBN 1578632692.
- Karr, Don (Autumn 2002). "Notes on the Study of Later Kabbalah in English". Journal of the Western Mystery Tradition (3).
- Lowy, A. (1888). Old Jewish Legends of Biblical Topics: Legendary Description of Hell. Proceedings of the Society of Biblical Archaeology. Vol. 10.
- Mathers, S. L. MacGregor (1887). The Kabbalah Unveiled. London: Kegan Paul, Trench, Trubner & Co.
- Mew, James (1903). Traditional Aspects of Hell: (Ancient and Modern). S. Sonnenschein & Company Lim.
- Pusey, Edward Bouverie (1881). What is of Faith as to Everlasting Punishment: In Reply to Dr. Farrar's Challenge in His 'Eternal Hope', 1879. James Parker & Co.
- Rees, Ian (2022). The Tree of Life and Death: Transforming the Qliphoth (PDF). Aeon Books Limited. ISBN 978-1801520065.
- Regardie, Israel (1970). The Golden Dawn. Llewellyn Worldwide. ISBN 0-87542-663-8.
