= Chokmah =

Biblical Hebrew word; 2nd emanation in Kabbalah

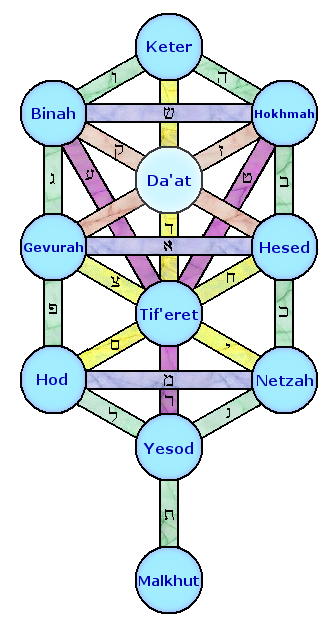
The Sefirot in Kabbalah
The Sefiroth in Jewish Kabbalah
View the image description page for this diagram	The Tree of Life

Chokmah (Hebrew: חָכְמָה, romanized: ḥoḵmā, also transliterated as chokma, chokhmah or hokhma) is the Biblical Hebrew word rendered as "wisdom" in English Bible versions (LXX σοφία sophia, Vulgate sapientia). It is the second of the ten sefirot in Kabbalah, and represents the first power of conscious intellect and subtle manifestation, emerging from Keter's pure potentiality. It embodies wisdom coming from nothingness, as highlighted in the Book of Job and the Bahir. Chokmah is the primordial point of divine wisdom that becomes comprehensible through Binah.

In Jewish mystical texts, Chokmah is described as the primordial point of divine wisdom, which shines forth from the will of God. This point remains incomprehensible until differentiated and given form in Binah. The ethical behavior associated with Chokmah involves emulating its dual nature: communion with the Creator to gain wisdom and teaching others the wisdom received. Practical applications of Chokmah in Kabbalistic practice include meditative techniques to cultivate wisdom, selflessness, and alignment with divine will.

In Western esotericism, Chokmah holds a significant place within Hermetic Qabalah, associated with analytical thinking and stability. Its corresponding divine name is Yah, its corresponding archangel is Raziel, and its corresponding angels are the Ophanim.

== Etymology and names ==
Chokmah (חָכְמָה), the Hebrew term for "wisdom", holds a prominent place in both Jewish mysticism and Gnostic traditions. Its etymology traces back to the Hebrew root ח-כ-מ, which conveys the concept of wisdom or insight. In Gnostic cosmology, Chokmah is frequently identified with Sophia (Σοφία in Greek), who embodies divine wisdom. Sophia's narrative is central to many Gnostic texts, where she is also known by the name Achamōth, a Greek derivation from the Hebrew word Chokmah.

The word occurs 149 times in the Masoretic Text of the Hebrew Bible. It is cognate with the Arabic word for "wisdom", ḥikma حكمة (Semitic root ḥ-k-m). Adjectival ḥakham "wise" is used as a honorific, as in Talmid Chakham (lit. "student of a sage") for a Torah scholar, or Hakham Bashi for a Chief Rabbi.

Chokmah is sometimes referred to as "Fear" (יִרְאָה, Yirah) in Kabbalistic texts because it represents an aspect of wisdom that is beyond measure and comprehension, "because it has no measure of boundary, and therefore the mind does not have the power to grasp it". This aligns with the idea expressed in the Book of Job that the "fear of God is the beginning of wisdom, and to depart from evil is understanding." This term emphasizes the awe and reverence associated with divine wisdom, reflecting the necessary humility and respect required to truly grasp and embody it.

== History ==
Chokmah, meaning "Wisdom," holds a foundational role in Jewish mystical texts such as the Sefer Yetzirah and the Zohar. In early Kabbalah, Chokmah represents the initial divine wisdom emanating from Keter, playing a pivotal role in the unfolding of the universe. The Zohar elaborates on this by describing Chokmah as the source of all wisdom and insight, crucial for the creative process.

In the 16th century, Isaac Luria, a key figure in Kabbalistic thought, emphasized Chokmah's importance in the cosmic process of tzimtzum (divine contraction) and tikkun (repair). Chokmah initiates the process of restoring the fragmented divine light, central to Lurianic Kabbalah's understanding of creation and redemption.

Contemporary Kabbalists, such as Rabbi Yehuda Ashlag, have further developed the understanding of Chokmah. Ashlag's interpretations highlight Chokmah's role in achieving spiritual enlightenment and ethical living, viewing it as essential for understanding the divine and our place within the cosmos.

== Description ==
Chokmah, the second of the ten sefirot, is the first power of conscious intellect within Creation, and the first point of subtle manifestation, since Keter represents emptiness. According to the book of Job, "Wisdom comes from nothingness". According to the Bahir:

The second (utterance) is wisdom, as is written: 'Y-H-W-H acquired me at the beginning of His way, before His deeds of old' (Prov 8:22). And there is no 'beginning' but wisdom."

In Rabbi Aryeh Kaplan's commentary on the Bahir he says "Wisdom (Chokmah) is therefore the first thing that the mind can grasp, and is therefore called a 'beginning'."

In the Zohar, Chokmah is the primordial point which shines forth from the will of God, the starting point of Creation. This point is infinitely small, and yet encompasses the whole of being; it remains incomprehensible until all things are differentiated and given shape and form in Binah, where they become intelligible.

In general, the sense of sight relates to Chokmah. The Zohar states that there is an inner, spiritual sense of taste in Chokmah that precedes and arouses the sense of sight. Chokmah appears in the configuration of the sefirot at the top of the right axis, and corresponds to the eyes in the divine image (tzelem Elohim):

these are comparable to the two eyes from which two teardrops Fell into the great sea. Chochmah is called eyes, and the right eye Is the upper chochmah and the left eye is the lower chochmah.

The word Chokmah is read in the Zohar (Numbers 220b) as koach mah, "the power of selflessness", or, alternatively, as cheich mah, "the palate of selflessness". "The power of selflessness" implies not only the attribute of selflessness itself, but the great creative power that selflessness entails. "The palate of selflessness" is the soul's ability to "taste" Divinity by virtue of one's state of selflessness, as is said (Psalms 34:8): "Taste and see that God is good."

== Qualities ==
=== Colour ===
Chokmah is associated with several colors in Kabbalistic tradition. Grey is often linked to Chokmah as it represents the blending of all colors, symbolizing comprehensive wisdom. Some traditions, especially those influenced by Western esotericism, associate Chokmah with blue, which signifies clarity and expansiveness, reflecting the profound nature of divine wisdom. White is another color associated with Chokmah, symbolizing purity and enlightenment, indicative of the undifferentiated light of wisdom.

=== Ethical behaviour ===
According to Moses ben Jacob Cordovero in The Palm Tree of Devorah, Chokmah has two faces, one facing Keter above, and the other overseeing the other sefirot. Therefore, to emulate this sefira, one aspect should be in communion with his Creator in order to increase his wisdom, and the other should be to teach others the wisdom that the Holy One has endowed him.

== Textual references ==
=== In the Hebrew Bible ===
The author of the book of Proverbs personifies Divine Wisdom as extant before the world was made, revealer of God, and actor as God's agent in creation (Prov 8:22–31; Wisdom 8:4–6; and Sir 1:4–9). Wisdom dwelt with God (Prov 8:22–31; Sir 24:4; and Wisdom 9:9–10) and, being the exclusive property of God, was as such inaccessible to human beings (Job 28:12–13, 20–1, 23–27). It was God who "found" Wisdom (Bar 3:29–37) and gave her to Israel: "He hath found out all the way of knowledge, and hath given it unto Jacob his servant, and to Israel his beloved. Afterward did he shew himself upon earth, and conversed with men." (Bar 3:36–37 and Sir 24:1–12).

As a female figure (Sir. 1:15 and Wis. 7:12), Wisdom addressed human beings (Prov. 1:20–33 and 8:1–9:6), inviting to her feast those who are not yet wise (Prov. 9:1-6). Wisdom of Solomon 7:22b–8:1 is a famous passage describing Divine Wisdom, including the passage:

For she is the breath of the power of God, and a pure influence flowing from the glory of the Almighty: therefore can no defiled thing fall into her. For she is the brightness of the everlasting light, the unspotted mirror of the power of God, and the image of his goodness. And being but one, she can do all things: and remaining in herself, she maketh all things new: and in all ages entering into holy souls, she maketh them friends of God, and prophets.

— Wisdom 7:25–27

Solomon, as the archetypal wise person, fell in love with Wisdom: "I loved her, and sought her out from my youth, I desired to make her my spouse, and I was a lover of her beauty." (Wisdom 8:2).

=== In the Apocrypha ===
The Book of Sirach, also known as Ecclesiasticus, contains significant references to Chokmah. In chapter 24, Wisdom speaks about her origins, role in creation, and dwelling among the people of Israel. Verses 13-17, often referred to as the "Riddling List of Ecclesiasticus", use a series of trees to describe Wisdom:

- Cedar: "I grew tall like a cedar in Lebanon, and like a cypress on the heights of Hermon."
- Palm tree: "I grew tall like a palm tree in En-gedi, and like rosebushes in Jericho."
- Olive tree: "Like a fair olive tree in the field, and like a plane tree beside water I grew tall."
- Cane: "Like cinnamon and camel's thorn, I gave forth perfume, and like choice myrrh I spread my fragrance."
- Galbanum, onyx, stacte, and frankincense: "Like galbanum, onyx, and stacte, and like the odor of frankincense in the tent."
- Terebinth: "Like a terebinth I spread out my branches, and my branches are glorious and graceful."

Each image in the list represents different attributes of Wisdom: the cedar and cypress for strength and majesty, the palm tree and rosebush for beauty and grace, the olive tree and plane tree for fruitfulness and resilience, and the aromatic plants for the pleasing and pervasive influence of Wisdom. The terebinth represents spreading influence and enduring presence.

=== In the Talmud ===
Chokmah is also discussed in the Talmud, representing a high level of wisdom. The Talmudic order of Kodshim, related to sacred things, is described in tractate Shabbat 31a as a significant area of study that imparts Chokmah. This reflects the importance of deep scholarly engagement with sacred texts as a path to attaining wisdom.

== Practical applications ==
In practical Kabbalistic practices, Chokmah is approached through meditation and contemplation to gain wisdom and insight. Practitioners focus on developing a deep sense of selflessness, as Chokmah embodies the "power of selflessness" (koach mah). This involves visualizing the flow of divine wisdom and seeking to align one's thoughts and actions with higher principles.

== In Western esotericism ==
In Hermetic Qabalah, the Tree of Life is viewed as if the practitioner is looking outward from within the diagram. This perspective places Chokmah on the practitioner's left, corresponding to the left hemisphere of the brain, often associated with analytical thinking. Chokmah is also considered the root of Jachin, one of the two pillars symbolizing stability and establishment.

According to the Hermetic Order of the Golden Dawn, the name of God associated with Chokmah is Yah, the archangel that presides over it is Raziel, who reveals divine secrets. The order of angels that reside in it are the Ophanim ("Wheels"), which represent dynamic divine insight. The Heaven of Assiah associated with it is called Mazloth, implying the fulfillment of destiny, and the physical manifestation associated with it is the Zodiac.

In Aleister Crowley's Liber 777, Chokmah is associated with the color grey, the four Twos of the Tarot, Shiva, Odin, Athena, God the Father, Amaranth, Star Ruby, Hashish, Yang and Khien, and Insanity. He lists its associated opposing qliphah as Ghagiel.

=== Paths ===
The paths connecting Chokmah to other sefirot are significant. The path to Keter is associated with The Fool, symbolizing the initial spark of creation. The path to Binah is linked to The Empress, representing the nurturing of wisdom into understanding. The path to Chesed corresponds to The Hierophant, symbolizing the transmission of divine wisdom through teaching. Lastly, the path to Tiferet is represented by The Emperor, reflecting the integration of wisdom into balanced authority.

== See also ==
- Chabad – Hasidic Jewish dynasty
- Hikmah – Concept of wisdom in Islamic philosophy
- Holy Wisdom – Concept in Christian theology
- Seder hishtalshelus – Chabad philosophy
- True Will – Concept within the system of Thelema
