= Beri'ah =

Second of the four celestial worlds in the Tree of Life of the Kabbalah

Beri'ah (Hebrew: בְּרִיאָה), Briyah, or B'ri'ah (also known as Olam Beriah, עוֹלָם בְּרִיאָה in Hebrew, literally "the World of Creation"), is the second of the four celestial worlds in the Tree of Life of the Kabbalah, intermediate between the World of Emanation (Atziluth) and the World of Formation (Yetzirah), the third world, that of the angels. It is known as the World of Creation, or Korsia (from Heb. כּוּרסָה - "seat, chair", the Throne).

Beri'ah is the first of the four worlds to be created ex nihilo, since Atzilut was emanated rather than created. Thus, although there exist beings that dwell in Atzilut, those beings are overwhelmed by the Divine Light and are unaware of their own existence; in Beri'ah however, the angels are dimly aware of their own existence as distinct from God's.

Beri'ah is the abode of the permanent archangels, as opposed to the non-permanent angels which dwell in Yetzirah.

== Correspondences ==
- The first of the two letter hei's ה in the Tetragrammaton
- The sefirah of Binah and hence the partzuf of Ima
- The element of Air.
- The soul-level of neshamah
- The soul-garment of thought
- The heart (Patach Eliyahu)
- In the allegory of the teacher and the student, the second stage where the teacher prepares the concept in his mind, splitting it into manageable parts and linking them together; the first conceptual expansion
- The recital of the Shema in Shacharit
- Within the Western mystery tradition, the classical element of water and the suit of cups in divinitory Tarot
