= Tiferet =

Sixth emanation in Kabbalah

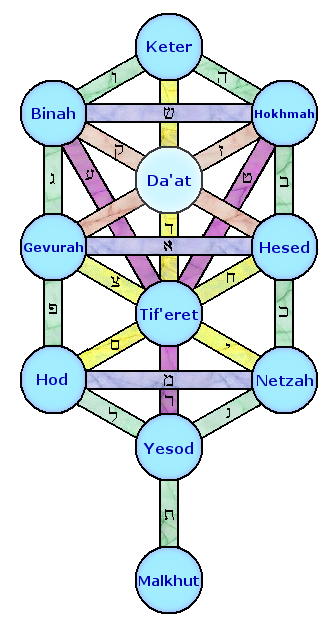
The Sefirot in Kabbalah
The Sefiroth in Jewish Kabbalah
View the image description page for this diagram	The Tree of Life

Tiferet (Hebrew: תִּפְאֶרֶת Tip̄ʾereṯ, in pausa: תִּפְאָרֶת Tip̄ʾāreṯ, lit. 'beauty, glory, adornment') alternatively Tifaret, Tiphareth, Tifereth or Tiphereth, is the sixth sefira in the kabbalistic Tree of Life. It has the common association of "Spirituality", "Balance", "Integration", "Beauty", "Miracles", and "Compassion".

== Description ==
In the Bahir it states: "Sixth is the adorned, glorious, delightful throne of glory, the house of the world to come. Its place is engraved in wisdom as it says 'God said: Let there be light, and there was light.'"

Tiferet is the force that integrates the sefira of Chesed ("Kindness") and Gevurah ("Strength", also called Din, "Judgement"). These two forces are, respectively, expansive (giving) and restrictive (receiving). Either of them without the other could not manifest the flow of Divine energy; they must be balanced in perfect proportion by balancing compassion with discipline. This balance can be seen in the role of Tiferet, wherein the conflicting forces are harmonized, and creation flowers forth. Tiferet also similarly balances Netzach and Hod. In that case, Hod can be seen as the intellect whereas Netzach is seen as emotion.

The Name of God associated with Tiferet is Adonay Eloah. The Archangel of this sphere is Raphael. Malakhim (messengers) are the Angelic order associated with Tiferet, and the planetary/astrological correspondence of Tiferet is the sun. The qlippa of Tiferet is represented by the demonic order Thagirion. The symbol associated with this sphere is a majestic King.

Tiferet also occupies a place on the middle pillar and can be seen as a lower reflection of Kether, as well as a higher reflection of Yesod and Malkuth. Tiferet relates to the Sun, and as such, it takes a central place in the lower face of the Tree of Life, much in the same manner that the Sun is at the center of the Solar System. It is not the center of the universe, as one could perhaps argue Kether to be, but rather it is the center of our local astronomical system. Nonetheless, it is the Sun that gives light and life, even though it did not create itself. Tiferet can be seen as a metaphor for these same attributes.

Tiferet is unique amongst the Sephirot as it is connected to all the other Sephirot (except Malkuth) via the subjective paths, be they conscious or less conscious. Its position down the center between Keter and Yesod indicates to many Kabbalists that it is somewhat of a "converting" Sephirot between form (Yesod) and force (Keter). In other words, all crossing over the middle path via Tiferet results in a reversed polarity. The law of conservation, valid both for energy and mass, tends to corroborate this – in all cases of energy transmutation, as it may happen in the transmission of gifts and goods from parents to their children, a sacrifice is necessary so a new form may be born.

Tiferet is the middle of the tree. Five Sefirot surround it: above are Chesed at the right (south) and Gevurah at the left (north), and below are Netzach at the right, Hod at the left, and Yesod directly below. Together these six are a single entity, Zer Anpin, which is the masculine counterpart of the feminine sefira Malkuth. In certain contexts, Tiferet alone represents all the sefirot of Zer Anpin, so that the entire tree appears with only five sefirot: Keter, Chochmah, Binah, Tiferet, and Malkhut.

In both the Jewish and Hermetic trees of life, Tiferet has eight paths, leading (counterclockwise) to Keter (through Daat), Binah, Gevurah, Hod, Yesod, Netsach, Chesed, and Chokmah.

Tiferet can be also a variation of the word "Tifarah" and in Modern Hebrew used in Israel is translated as "Glory" (from God – "Elohim, Adonay).

== See also ==
- Chabad – Hasidic Jewish dynasty
- Hikmah – Concept of wisdom in Islamic philosophy
- Holy Wisdom – Concept in Christian theology
- Seder hishtalshelus – Chabad philosophy
- True Will – Concept within the system of Thelema
