= Assiah =

Spiritual world of the Kabbalah

Assiah (Hebrew: עֲשִׂיָּה, romanized: ʿĂśiyyā; also 'Asiya or 'Asiyah, also known as Olam Asiyah, עוֹלָם עֲשִׂיָּה "World of Action") is the last of the four spiritual worlds of the Kabbalah based on the passage in Isaiah 43:7. It is identical to the existing world that we live in.

According to the Masseket Azilut, it is the region where the ophanim rule and where they promote the hearing of prayers, support human endeavour, and combat evil. Their ruler is Sandalphon. According to the system of Lurianic Kabbalah, ʿAsiyya is the lowest of the spiritual worlds, containing the Ten Heavens and the whole system of mundane Creation. The light of the sefirot emanates from these Ten Heavens, which are called the Ten Sefirot of ʿAsiyya. Through them, spirituality and piety are imparted to the realm of matter, the seat of the dark and impure powers.

Representing purely material existence, it is known as the World of Action, the World of Effects or the World of Making. In Western esotericism, it is associated with the suit of coins in the Tarot. The world of Yetzirah precedes it.

== Correspondences ==
- He, the final letter in the Tetragrammaton
- The sefira of Malkuth and hence the partzuf of Nukvah
- The classical element of Earth
- The soul-level of nephesh
- The soul-garment of action
- The mouth in "Patach Eliyahu"
- The Oral Torah tradition in "Patach Eliyahu"
- The Shekhina
- The birkot hashachar and the order of the Korbanot in the Shacharit prayer service
- In the allegory of the teacher and the student, the final stage is where the student comprehends the teacher's lesson, expanding the compressed information to its full breadth
- The fixed, earth, sign of Taurus (astrology)
- * Within Western esotericism; the classical element of earth and the suit of coins in Tarot card reading
