= Tomer Devorah =

Book by Moses Cordovero

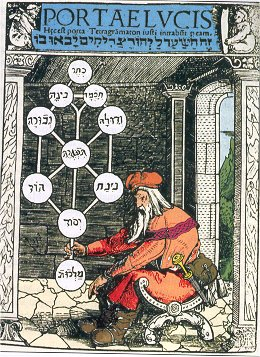
Book- Tree of life, Medieval

Tomer Devorah or The Palm Tree of Deborah (Hebrew: תומר דבורה) was written in Hebrew in the middle of the 16th century by Moses ben Jacob Cordovero, a Jewish kabbalist in Safed, Ottoman Syria (Land of Israel). This short text deals mostly with the Imitation of God through the acquisition of divine traits, especially those of the sephirot. The first edition was published in Venice in 1588. Although not widely read among Jews today, it is popular in the musar movement, which focuses on the individual cultivation of the Thirteen Attributes of Mercy of God.

The title is taken from Judges 4:5.

== Modern readings ==
Those who value Jewish ethics, mysticism, and spiritual self-improvement, and its teachings, such as compassion, kindness, and forgiveness, can appreciate these mythical traditions with modern concepts that Tomer Devorah inspired.
