= Keter =

First emanation in Kabbalah

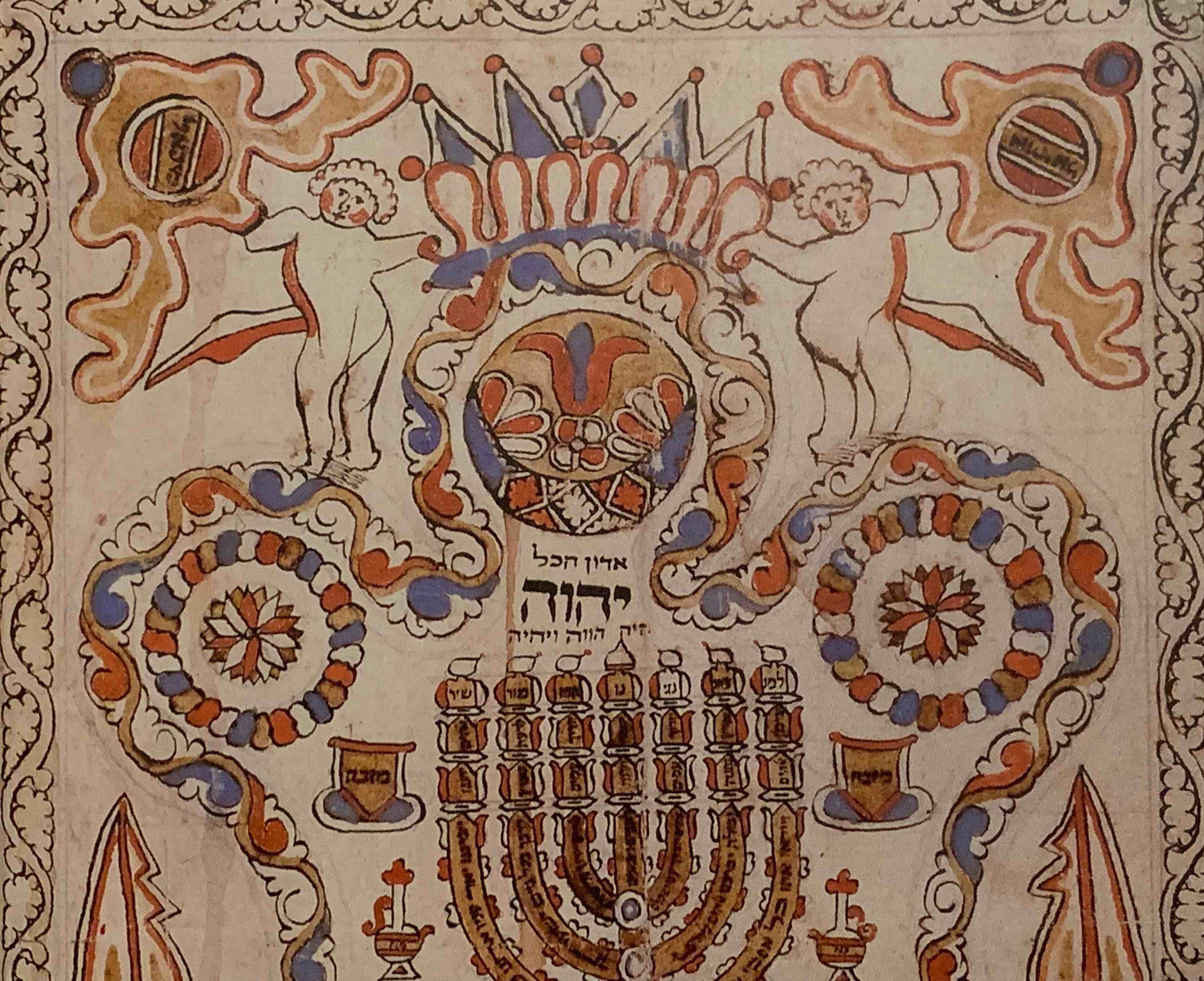
Keter as depicted in a Mizrach printing by Samuel Habib (1828)

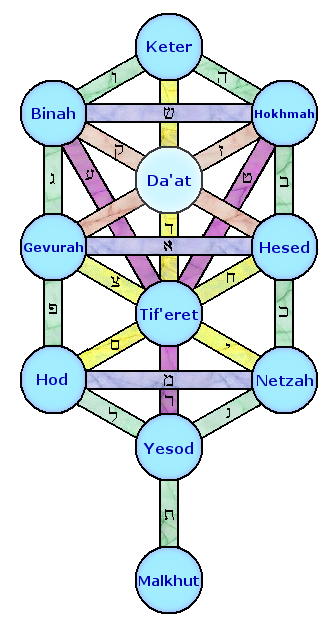
The Sefirot in Kabbalah
The Sefiroth in Jewish Kabbalah
View the image description page for this diagram	The Tree of Life

Keter or Kether (Hebrew: כֶּתֶר, romanized: Keṯer, lit. 'crown';) is the first of the ten sefirot in the Kabbalistic Tree of Life, symbolizing the divine will and the initial impulse towards creation from the Ein Sof, or infinite source. It represents pure consciousness and transcends human understanding, often referred to as "Nothing" or the "Hidden Light". Keter is associated with the divine name "Ehyeh Asher Ehyeh" (אֶהְיֶה אֲשֶׁר אֶהְיֶה), meaning "I Am that I Am", which was revealed to Moses from the burning bush, and it embodies the qualities of absolute compassion and humility. Its meaning is "crown", and it is interpreted as both the "topmost" of the Sefirot and the "regal crown" thereof.

Keter is positioned at the top of the Tree of Life, sitting above and between Chokmah on the right and Binah on the left, and above Tiferet. It is often depicted with three primary paths: one leading to Chokmah, another to Binah, and the third to Tiferet. This positioning highlights its role as the source from which wisdom (Chokmah) and understanding (Binah) emanate, and it emphasizes its connection to beauty and harmony (Tiferet), thereby facilitating the flow of divine energy through the sefirot.

Keter is called in the Zohar "the most hidden of all hidden things". Moses ben Jacob Cordovero describes Keter as the source of the Thirteen Attributes of Mercy, derived from a verse in the Book of Micah. These attributes emphasize compassion, forgiveness, and humility. Cordovero also outlines ethical behavior associated with Keter in his work The Palm Tree of Devorah, encouraging purity of thought and actions, such as always turning one's ears to hear good and avoiding anger.

In Western esotericism, Keter is linked to the initial point of divine emanation, representing pure formless consciousness. It is associated with various divine and mystical figures, such as the archangel Metatron and the Tetramorph of the Holy Living Creatures.

== Etymology and names ==
The Hebrew word "Keter" (כֶּתֶר) translates to "crown". Since a crown is worn above the head, Keter symbolizes the highest level of the sefirot and the divine will in Kabbalah. Keter is also known as "Nothing" (אַיִן, ayin) or "The Hidden Light" (אוֹר הַגָּנוּז, Or HaGanuz), reflecting its abstract and ineffable nature. Keter is referenced in key Kabbalistic texts such as the Bahir and the Zohar, where it is described as "the most hidden of all hidden things".

== History ==
The concept of Keter has evolved significantly within Kabbalistic thought. Early references to Keter can be found in foundational texts such as the Sefer Yetzirah and Bahir. In these texts, Keter is described as the first emanation, representing the initial divine will and the beginning of creation. The Zohar, a cornerstone of Kabbalistic literature, describes Keter as "the most hidden of all hidden things", emphasizing its transcendence and ineffability. Medieval Kabbalists, including Moses ben Jacob Cordovero (1522-1570) and Isaac Luria (1534-1572), further elaborated on Keter's attributes, solidifying its role as the highest sefirah and its importance in the divine emanation process. These interpretations influenced later Kabbalistic and Hasidic teachings.

Kabbalah made its way into Western esotericism during the Renaissance, largely through the efforts of figures like Johannes Reuchlin (1455-1522), who studied and wrote about Kabbalah extensively. In the 19th century, Eliphas Levi (1810-1875) further integrated Kabbalistic ideas into Western occult traditions. The Hermetic Order of the Golden Dawn, founded by Samuel Liddell MacGregor Mathers (1854-1918) and others, incorporated Kabbalah into their teachings, significantly shaping modern Western esotericism. Aleister Crowley (1875-1947), a prominent figure in Western occultism, also utilized Kabbalistic concepts in his works, particularly in The Book of Thoth, which connects the tarot to the Tree of Life.

== Description ==
According to the Bahir:

What are the ten utterances? The first is supreme crown, blessed be His name and His people.

The first sefirah is called the Crown, since a crown is worn above the head. The Crown therefore refers to things that are above the mind's abilities to comprehend. All of the other sephirot are likened to the body which starts with the head and winds its way down into action. But the crown of a king lies above the head and connects the concept of "monarchy," which is abstract and intangible, with the tangible and concrete head of the king. The crown endows the person with the power and prerogatives of royalty.

Keter represents the primal stirrings of intent in the Ein Soph (infinity), or the arousal of desire to come forth into the varied life of being. But in this sense, although it contains all the potential for content, it contains no content itself, and is therefore called "Nothing", "The Hidden Light", and the "air that cannot be grasped". Being desire to bring the world into being, Keter is absolute compassion.

Keter is associated with two partzufim or divine personas: Arik Anpin (אריך אנפין) and Atik Yomin (עתיק יומין). Arik Anpin, the "Vast Countenance", symbolizes boundless mercy and spiritual bliss (ענג רוחני, oneg ruchani), while Atik Yomin, the "Ancient of Days", represents the primal roots of divine consciousness and will (רצון, ratzon). In the symbolic family hierarchy, Atik Yomin is the great-grandfather, and Arik Anpin is the grandfather. Together, these partzufim reflect Keter's dual nature as both an all-encompassing force and a deeply concealed, primordial essence.

The name of God associated with Keter is "Ehyeh Asher Ehyeh" (Hebrew: אהיה אשר אהיה), the name through which he revealed himself to Moses from the burning bush. Keter, although being the highest sefirah of its world, receives from the sefirah of Malkuth of the domain above it (see Sephirot). The uppermost Keter sits below no other sefirah, although it is below Ohr Ein Sof ("Infinite Light"), which is the source of all Sefirot.

== Qualities ==
=== Colour ===
Keter is often associated with brilliance or translucent white. This color symbolizes the pure, undifferentiated light of the Ein Sof (Infinite), representing the ultimate potential and the source of all creation. Aryeh Kaplan describes Keter as being associated with "radiant, brilliant light" that transcends human perception, symbolizing spiritual purity and divine will. Gershom Scholem notes that Keter's primal light is a metaphor for the most abstract and sublime aspect of the divine. Moshe Idel refers to this light as the "hidden light," embodying the concept of potentiality and the source of all subsequent emanations.

=== Ethical behaviour ===
Moses ben Jacob Cordovero, in The Palm Tree of Devorah, discusses ethical behaviour that man should follow, related to the qualities of the Sephirot, in order that man might emulate his Creator. Humility is the first, because although Keter is the highest, it is ashamed to look at its cause, and instead gazes at those below it. One's thoughts should be pure, one's forehead should display no harshness, one's ears should always turn to hear good, one's eyes should distance themselves from noticing evil, always looking at the good, one's nose should be free from the breath of anger, one's face should always shine, and his mouth should express nothing except good.

=== Thirteen Attributes of Mercy ===
Through discussion of a line in the Book of Micah, 13 attributes are associated with Keter:

Who is God like you, who pardons iniquity and forgives the transgressions of the remnant of his heritage? He does not maintain His anger forever, for He delights in kindness. He will again show us compassion, He will vanquish our iniquities, and You will cast all their sins into the depths of the sea. Show faithfulness to Ya'akov, kindness to Avraham, which You have sworn to our fathers from days of old. (Michah, 7:18-20)

Accordingly, the 13 attributes are derived from this and are described in great detail.

Additionally, the "Thirteen Attributes of Mercy" were described by Rabbi Chizkiyah in an allegorical depiction of a lily among thorns. The metaphor in whole is known and taught as "The lily amongst the thorns," a phrase found in Shir Hashirim 2:2. A summary:

The secret of spiritual protection is revealed through a richly metaphorical discourse given by Rabbi Chizkiyah. The Rabbi explains that the spiritual forces that protect and watch over us are called the 13 Attributes of Mercy. They are transmitted into our physical world through the first 13 words of the Torah. When judgments are decreed against us, these 13 forces can safeguard us from their influence. We begin drawing this Light of protection to ourselves at the very moment we begin to browse and behold the mystical shapes and sequences of the Aramaic text, and to learn the spiritual insights presented there.

== Practical applications ==
In practical Kabbalistic practices, Keter is approached through meditation and visualization techniques aimed at connecting with the divine will and transcendent consciousness. Practitioners often focus on the attributes of Keter, such as absolute compassion and humility, to cultivate these qualities within themselves. Meditative exercises may involve visualizing the crown above the head, symbolizing the flow of divine energy into one's being. Reciting sacred texts and prayers associated with Keter, such as "Ehyeh Asher Ehyeh," is also common, aiming to align oneself with the highest level of spiritual awareness and intention.

== In Western esotericism ==
In Western esotericism, Keter is considered the purest form of consciousness, transcending time and categories, originating from the Ein Sof Aur ("Limitless Light"), and initiating the process of divine emanation that culminates in Malkuth. Associated with the divine name "Eheieh", the archangel that presides over it is Metatron, the order of angels that resides in it are the Holy Living Creatures (Chaioth ha Qadesh, חיות הקדש), and its physical manifestation is said to be the First Swirlings of the cosmos (Primum Mobile, Rashith ha Gilgalin).

In The Mystical Qabalah, Dion Fortune describes Keter as a timeless point of pure consciousness, marking the beginning of emanation. In the Golden Dawn tradition, Keter is identified with the planet Neptune, reflecting its connection to the mystical and the unknown. In Theosophy and Thelema, Keter is analogous to Ātma and Khabs am Pekht, respectively.

A. E. Waite wrote that Rabbi Azariel ben Menachem, a student of Isaac the Blind, in his Commentary on the Sephiroth granted a particular colour to each sefirah, yet these do not agree with the colours given in the Zohar, where Kether is called colourless, Tiphareth purple, and Malkuth sapphire-blue. In Aleister Crowley's Liber 777, Keter is associated with White Brilliance, the Four Aces of the Tarot, Parabrahm, Wotan, Zeus, the Trinity, Almond in flower, Diamond, Elixir Vitae, Shangti, and Death. He also connects Keter to the qlippothic order of Thaumiel.

=== Paths ===
Keter connects to three primary paths, each leading to different sefirot and associated with specific tarot cards. The path to Chokmah, symbolizing wisdom and the initial creative impulse, is linked to "The Fool", representing potential and new beginnings. The path to Binah, representing understanding and structure, corresponds to "The Magician", symbolizing mastery and manifestation. The path to Tiferet, signifying beauty, balance, and harmony, is associated with "The High Priestess" representing intuition and inner knowledge. These paths highlight Keter's role in channeling divine energy and insight through the Tree of Life.

== In popular culture ==
In the SCP Foundation mythos and related media, "Keter" is one of the primary classifications for anomalous objects or entities. Specifically, the "Keter" classification denotes objects or entities that are exceedingly difficult to reliably contain.

== See also ==
- Abrahadabra
- Ayin and Yesh
- Crown of Creation
- Nondualism
- Seder hishtalshelus
- Chabad – Hasidic Jewish dynasty
- Hikmah – Concept of wisdom in Islamic philosophy
- Holy Wisdom – Concept in Christian theology
- True Will – Concept within the system of Thelema
