= Malkuth =

Tenth emanation in Kabbalah

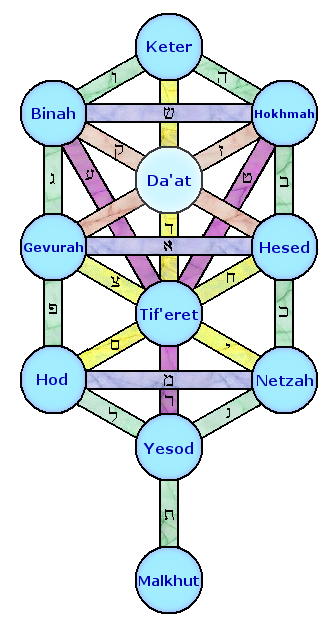
The Sefirot in Kabbalah
The Sefiroth in Jewish Kabbalah
View the image description page for this diagram	The Tree of Life

Malkuth (/mɑːlˈkuːθ/; Hebrew: מַלְכוּת, romanized: Malḵūṯ [malxuːθ] "kingdom"; Ashkenazi: Malkhus [malχus]), Malkhut, Malkhuth, or Malchus, is the tenth of the sefirot in the Kabbalistic Tree of Life.

== Description ==
"Earth" is equivalent to the sefirah of Malkhut, which is associated with the earth. Therefore earth – like Malkhut – represents the Oral Law. And the Oral Law is the source of the spirit of every living being, as the verse states: "Let the earth bring forth living creatures, each according to its own kind"

— Rebbe Nachman of Breslov, Likutey Moharan I, 12:1).

In the Zohar, an important Kabbalistic text from late al-Andalus, Malkuth sits at the bottom of the Tree of Life below Yesod and "governs the simple fact of existence in the physical world"; it is also known as Shekhinah. "[T]he central teaching of the Zohar coalesced around an anthropomorphic model, in which the sefirot represent a cosmic anthropos. The lower sefirot, Malkhut, Yesod, Hod, and Nezah, constitute the most physical dimension of life, the nefesh."

Unlike the other nine sephirot, it is an attribute of God which does not emanate from God directly. Rather it emanates from God's creation—when that creation reflects and evinces God's glory from within itself.

== Qualities ==
=== Ethical Behavior ===
Malkuth is representative of everything, this is extrapolated from its position in the Tree of life (Kabbalah). It is polar opposite Sefirah of Keter, which is the Sefirot that represents "nothingness," or the "holy light." This juxtaposition of the two Sefirot is reflected in the behavior which is connected to Malkuth. Behaviors which are connected to Malkuth include: living a life of humility, taking part in practical action, participating in environmental stewardship, realizing that there is no place of Him (God), and the metaphorical act of 'bringing heaven down to Earth.'

== Practical Applications ==
In Practical Kabbalah practices, Malkuth differs from the other sefirot. Where most of the Sefirot are approached through non-physical and mental practices such as meditation and visualization, Malkuth is rather practiced through ones mental processes and physical actions. To practically apply Malkuth one must take part in physical commandments, give charity to those in need, and have a mindfulness of the physical world in which they live. Taking part in the physical commandments is as simple as it sounds, a practitioner must follow the Ten Commandments outlined by God. The last mentioned practical application, mindfulness of the physical world, can be better understood when viewed in conjunction with the ethical behaviors that are connected to Malkuth. The ethical behaviors such as taking part in practical action, practicing environmental stewardship, and 'bringing heaven down to Heart,' are such applications of being mindful of one's physical world. This mindfulness can be described as having a healthy and caring relationship with the Earth and nature, not mistreating the land that one lives on.

== In Western esotericism ==
Malkuth means Kingdom. It is associated with the realm of matter/earth and relates to the physical world, the planets and the Solar System. It is important not to think of this sephirah as "unspiritual". Even though Malkuth is the emanation "furthest" from the Divine Source, it is still on the Tree of Life and therefore has its own unique spiritual qualities. It is often said that Kether (the "highest" sephira) is in Malkuth and Malkuth is in Kether. As the receiving sphere of all the other sephiroth, Malkuth gives tangible form to the other emanations. The Divine energy comes down and finds its expression in this plane, and our purpose as human beings is to bring that energy back around the circuit again and back up the Tree.

Malkuth is also associated with the World of Assiah, the material plane, and the "densest" of the Four Worlds of the Kabbalah. Because of this relation to Assiah, it is also related to the suit of Pentacles or Coins of the Tarot. Through Assiah, Malkuth is also related to the four Page cards in the Tarot as well. There is also a connection between Malkuth and the tenth card of each suit in Tarot as Malkuth is the tenth sephiroth. In the modern set of playing cards, Malkuth is related to the Suit of Diamonds' symbolizing material wealth, or the treasures found in the physical world. Malkuths association with the Page cards of the Tarot is reflected in the modern playing card deck as the Jacks of the deck. As Malkuth is directly associated with Assiah, Malkuth also represents the second He (ה) in the Tetragrammaton (יהוה), and is associated with the classical element of Earth.

The Names of God associated with Malkuth are Adonai Melekh and Adonai ha-Arets. The Archangel of this sphere is Sandalphon. The Ishim (Souls of Fire) is the Angelic order associated with Malkuth, and the planetary/astrological correspondence of Malkuth is the Earth. The qlippah of Malkuth is represented by the demonic order Nehemoth. Symbols associated with this sphere are a Bride (a young woman on a throne with a veil over her face) and a double cubed altar. Where Binah is known as the Superior Mother, Malkuth is referred to as the Inferior Mother. It is also referred to as the Bride of Microprosopos, where the Macroprosopos is Kether.

== See also ==
- Malakut
