= Binah (Kabbalah) =

Third emanation in Kabbalah

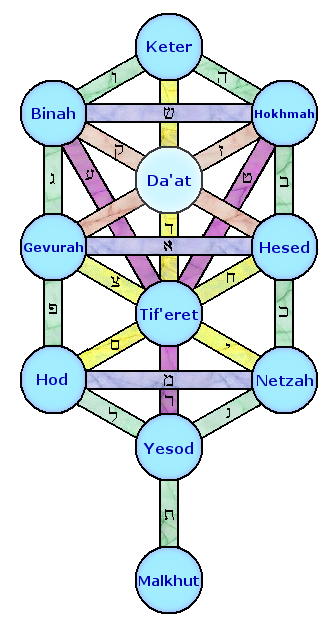
The Sefirot in Kabbalah
The Sefiroth in Jewish Kabbalah
View the image description page for this diagram	The Tree of Life

Binah (meaning "understanding"; Hebrew: בִּינָה Bīnā) is the third sephira on the kabbalistic Tree of Life. It sits on the level below Keter (in the formulations that include that sephirah), across from Chokmah and directly above Gevurah. It is usually given four paths: from Keter, Chokmah, to Gevurah and Tiphereth.

== Etymology and names ==
The word derives from a Hebrew root meaning to distinguish or discern. It points to the process of taking a vague idea and working it through until it becomes clear. Kabbalistic texts often describe Binah as a kind of ‘mother’—the place where ideas grow up and take shape.

A few later interpretations compare Binah to a nest—an image for how understanding ‘holds’ and develops ideas—but this isn’t a standard view.

== History ==
Binah shows up early in Jewish mystical writing such as the Sefer Yetzirah, which dates between the 2nd and 6th centuries CE. In Sefer Yetzirah, it appears as one of the sefirot—the basic channels through which divine energy flows.

In the medieval period, Binah's role in Kabbalistic cosmology was significantly developed with the publication of the Zohar in the late 13th century. Attributed to the 2nd-century sage Shimon bar Yochai but likely compiled by Moses de León, the Zohar describes Binah as the "supernal mother" from whom the lower sefirot emanate.

The 16th-century teachings of Isaac Luria, known as Lurianic Kabbalah, introduced complex ideas about the sefirot's dynamics and interactions. In Lurianic Kabbalah, Binah helps repair the world after the cosmic ‘shattering’ (Shevirat HaKelim), a way of describing how order is rebuilt from chaos.

== Description ==
Binah, the third of the ten sefirot, represents "understanding" or "contemplation". According to the Bahir:

The third (utterance): quarry of the Torah, treasury of wisdom, quarry of God's spirit, hewn out by the spirit of God. This teaches that God hewed out all the letters of the Torah, engraving them with the Spirit, casting His forms within it.

Binah is often likened to a 'palace of mirrors' that reflects the pure point of light of Chokmah (wisdom), increasing and multiplying it in an infinite variety of ways. In this metaphor, Binah is the 'quarry' carved out by the light of wisdom. It is also described as the womb that gives shape to the Spirit of God. On a psychological level, Binah is 'processed wisdom', also known as deductive reasoning. It is davar mitoch davar—"understanding one idea from another idea". While Chokmah represents intellect that does not stem from the rational process (it is either inspired or taught), Binah embodies the innate rational process within a person, working to develop an idea fully.

Binah is associated with the feminine aspect of divinity. The Bahir states: "For you shall call Understanding a Mother" (Bahir 75). Classical Jewish texts further elaborate, stating that "Binah yeterah natun l'nashim" ("an extra measure of Binah was given to women").

In its fully articulated form, Binah possesses two partzufim. The higher of these is referred to as Imma Ila'ah ("the higher mother"), whereas the lower is referred to as tevunah ("comprehension"). These two partzufim are referred to jointly as Imma ("the mother").

=== Qualities ===
Binah is associated with the color black, which in this context symbolizes the absorption of all colors.

According to Moses ben Jacob Cordovero in The Palm Tree of Devorah, the ethical quality associated with Binah is complete repentance and rectification of flaws: "Just as Binah sweetens all severities and neutralizes their bitterness, one should repent and rectify all flaws." This process involves deep introspection, acknowledging one's errors, and making sincere efforts to improve. By doing so, one can emulate Binah's nurturing and transformative qualities.

== Practical applications ==
The Hebrew term for contemplative meditation, hitbonenut, derives from the same root (b-y-n, "to discern") as Binah. In Chabad Hasidism, whose name is an acronym for Chokhmah, Binah, and Da'at, Binah designates the stage of sustained intellectual contemplation in which an initial flash of insight (Chokhmah) is developed into detailed, structured understanding. Shneur Zalman of Liadi's Tanya presents this contemplative process as the means by which abstract knowledge of the divine is internalized enough to arouse emotion in prayer. Aryeh Kaplan discusses meditative techniques associated with the sefirot, including Binah, in his surveys of Jewish meditation.

== In Western esotericism ==
In Western esotericism, Binah is seen to channel the raw force of Chokmah into the various forms of creation. This transformative aspect of Binah is crucial in shaping the chaotic, unformed energy of Chokmah into structured, intelligible forms.

The name of God associated with Binah in Western esoteric traditions is Jehovah Elohim. The archangel presiding over Binah is Tzaphkiel, and the order of angels that resides in it are the Aralim (the Thrones). The planet Saturn is also linked to Binah.

Binah is related to the Yoni, the womb, and the Priestess card in the occult tarot. Aleister Crowley's Liber 777 associates it with Isis, Cybele, Demeter, Rhea, Woman, The Virgin Mary, Juno, Hecate, and the "threes" of the Tarot.

For its negative counterpart in the qlippoth (the impure or demonic realm), Binah corresponds to the demonic order of Sathariel.

=== Paths ===
The paths connecting Binah to other sefirot on the Kabbalistic Tree of Life highlight its transformative role. The path from Keter to Binah, represented by The Magician in the Tarot, symbolizes the descent of divine will into structured understanding. The path from Chokmah to Binah, linked to The Empress, signifies the nurturing of unbounded wisdom into structured knowledge. The path from Binah to Geburah, symbolized by The Chariot, represents the application of disciplined actions based on understanding. Lastly, the path from Binah to Tiphareth, associated with The Lovers, involves the integration of understanding into harmonious expression.

== See also ==
- Great Work – Concept within the system of Thelema
- Seder hishtalshelus – Chabad philosophy
