= Ramiel =

Fallen Watcher (angel)

Ramiel (Imperial Aramaic: רַעַמְאֵל, Hebrew: רַעַמְאֵל Raʿamʾēl; Greek: Ῥαμιήλ) is a fallen Watcher angel. He is mentioned in Chapter 6 of the apocryphal Book of Enoch as one of the 19 Watchers that sinned and rebelled against God by mating with human women and creating offspring called Nephilim.

The name Raʿamʾēl means "God has thundered" from the Hebrew elements Raʿam "thunder" and El, "God".

He is sometimes conflated with the angel Remiel (described below), who is separately named as a holy angel in some versions of Chapter 2 of the Book of Enoch, and who is in turn sometimes conflated with the angel Jeremiel (q.v.).

== Watcher ==
There are 20 Watchers in the Book of Enoch, also called 1 Enoch. The section that mentions them reads:

7. And these are the names of their watchers: Sêmîazâz, their leader, Arâkîba, Râmêêl, Kôkabîêl, Tâmîêl, Râmîêl, Dânêl, Êzêqêêl, Barâqîjâl, Asâêl, Armârôs, Batârêl, Anânêl, Zaqîêl, Samsâpêêl, Sathariel, Tûrêl, Jômjâêl, Sariêl. 8. These are their chiefs of tens." - R. H. Charles translation, The Book of the Watchers, Chapter VI.

As described in 1 Enoch, these are the leaders of 200 angels that are turned into fallen angels due to their taking wives, mating with human women, and teaching forbidden knowledge. Of 20 leaders, Ramiel is mentioned sixth.

== Archangel ==
Remiel

Archangel
- Venerated in: Judaism, Ethiopian Orthodox Tewahedo Church

Remiel, also known as Jeremiel (Hebrew: יְרַחְמְאֵל Yəraḥməʾēl, Tiberian: Yăraḥmē̆ʾēl, "God shall have mercy"; Greek: Ρεμειήλ), is mentioned in 2 Baruch as he who "presides over true visions" (55:3) and listed as one of seven Holy Angels in 1 Enoch 20:8. In this chapter, he is described as "one of the holy angels, whom God set over those who rise".

Remiel is the archangel of hope and credited with two tasks: he is responsible for divine visions, and he guides the souls of the faithful into Heaven. He is called Jeremiel and Uriel in various translations of 4 Esdras.

== See also ==
- List of angels in theology
- 2 Baruch
- Azazel
- Remiel (DC Comics)
- Remiel (Tales of Symphonia)
- Ramiel (Evangelion)
