= Watcher (angel) =

Class of angelic beings in biblical texts

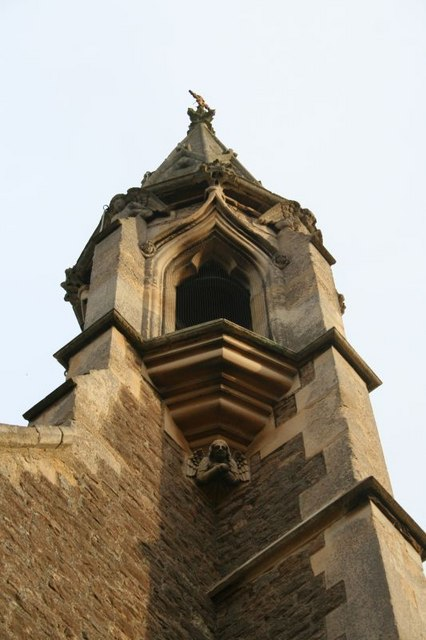
Watching angel on the spire of St Michael's church, Clifton Hampden, Oxfordshire, England

A watcher (Aramaic עִיר ʿiyr, plural עִירִין ʿiyrin, Greek: ἐιρ or ἐγρήγορος, egrḗgoros (Note: In Daniel, the Septuagint has ἐιρ while Aquila and Symmachus have ἐγρήγορος. Enoch has ἐγρήγορος.)) is a type of biblical angel. The word is related to the root meaning to be awake. (Note: Theodotian trans: ir; from the root of Heb. ʿer, "awake, watchful"; Greek: ἐγρήγοροι, transl.: egrḗgoroi; "Watchers", "those who are awake"; "guard", "watcher") It occurs in both plural and singular forms in the Book of Daniel, where reference is made to the holiness of the beings. The apocryphal Books of Enoch (2nd–1st centuries BC) refer to both good and bad Watchers, with a primary focus on the rebellious ones.

== Good watchers in Daniel ==
In Daniel 4:13, 17, 23 there are three references to the class of "watcher, holy one" ("watcher", Aramaic ʿir; "holy one", Aramaic qaddish). The term is introduced by Nebuchadnezzar who says he saw "a watcher, a holy one come down (singular verb) from heaven." He describes how in his dream the watcher says that Nebuchadnezzar will eat grass and be mad and that this punishment is "by the decree of the watchers, the demand by the word of the holy ones" ... "that the living may know that the Most High rules in the kingdom of men." After hearing the king's dream, Daniel considers for an hour and then responds:

And whereas the king saw a holy watcher coming down from heaven and saying, ‘Cut down the tree and destroy it, but leave its stump and roots in the ground, with a band of iron and bronze, in the grass of the field, and let him be bathed with the dew of heaven, and let his lot be with the animals of the field, until seven times pass over him’—this is the interpretation, O king, and it is a decree of the Most High that has come upon my lord the king: You shall be driven away from human society, and your dwelling shall be with the wild animals. You shall be made to eat grass like oxen, you shall be bathed with the dew of heaven, and seven times shall pass over you, until you have learned that the Most High has sovereignty over the kingdom of mortals and gives it to whom he will. Daniel 4:23–25 (NRSVue)

Lutheran Protestant reformer Johann Wigand viewed the watcher in Nebuchadnezzar's dream as either God himself, or the Son of God. He promoted Trinitarian thinking by linking verse 17 ("The sentence is rendered by decree of the watchers") with verse 24 ("this is the interpretation, O king, and it is a decree of the Most High that has come upon my lord the king:").

Scholars view these "watchers, holy ones" as perhaps showing an influence of Babylonian religion, that is an attempt by the author of this section of Daniel to present Nebuchadnezzar's Babylonian gods recognizing the power of the god of Israel as "Most High". The Greek Septuagint version differs from the Aramaic Masoretic Text: for example, the Aramaic text is ambiguous about who is telling the story of verse 14, whether it is Nebuchadnezzar, or the watcher in his dream.

== Books of Enoch ==
The first Book of Enoch devotes much of its attention to the fall of the watchers. The Second Book of Enoch addresses the watchers (Gk. egrḗgoroi) who are in fifth heaven where the fall took place. The Third Book of Enoch gives attention to the unfallen watchers.

The use of the term "watchers" is common in the Book of Enoch. The Book of the Watchers (1 Enoch 6–36) occurs in the Aramaic fragments with the phrase irin we-qadishin, "Watchers and Holy Ones", a reference to Aramaic Daniel. The Aramaic irin "watchers" is rendered as "angel" (Greek angelos, Coptic malah) in the Greek and Ethiopian translations, although the usual Aramaic term for angel malakha does not occur in Aramaic Enoch.

Some have attempted to date this section of 1 Enoch to around the 2nd–1st century BC and they believe this book is based on one interpretation of the Sons of God passage in Genesis 6, according to which angels mated with human females, giving rise to a race of hybrids known as the Nephilim. The term irin is primarily applied to disobedient watchers who numbered a total of 200, and of whom their leaders are named; but equally Aramaic iri ("watcher" singular) is applied to the obedient archangels who chain them, such as Raphael (1 Enoch 22:6).

=== Rogue watchers in the Book of Enoch ===
In the Book of Enoch, the watchers (Aramaic עִירִין, iyrin) are angels dispatched to Earth to watch over the humans. They soon begin to lust for human women and, at the prodding of their leader Samyaza, defect to illicitly instruct mankind and procreate among them, arriving Mount Hermon. The offspring of these unions are the Nephilim, savage giants who pillage the earth and endanger humanity.

Samyaza and his associates further taught their human charges arts and technologies such as weaponry, cosmetics, mirrors, sorcery, and other techniques that would otherwise be discovered gradually over time by humans, not foisted upon them all at once. Eventually, God allows a Great Flood to rid the earth of the Nephilim, but first sends Uriel to warn Noah so as not to eradicate the human race. The watchers are bound "in the valleys of the Earth" until Judgment Day (Jude 1:6 "And the angels who did not keep their own position but deserted their proper dwelling, he has kept in eternal chains in deepest darkness for the judgment of the great day.") (NRSVue).

The chiefs of tens, listed in the Book of Enoch, are as follows:

7. And these are the names of their chiefs: Shemihazah—this one was their leader; Arteqoph, second to him; Remashel, third to him; Kokabel, fourth to him; Armumahel, fifth to him; Ramiel, sixth to him; Daniel, seventh to him; Ziqel, eighth to him; Baraqel, ninth to him; Asael, tenth to him; Hermani, eleventh to him; Matarel, twelfth to him; Ananel, thirteenth to him; Setawel, fourteenth to him; Samshiel, fifteenth to him; Sahriel, sixteenth to him; Tummiel, seventeenth to him; Turiel, eighteenth to him; Yomiel, nineteenth to him; Yehadiel, twentieth to him. 8. These are their chiefs of tens.

— George W.E. Nickelsburg, 1 Enoch: The Hermeneia Translation, Chapter 6

The book of Enoch also lists leaders of the 200 fallen angels who married and commenced unnatural unions with human women, and who taught forbidden knowledge. Some are also listed in Book of Raziel (Sefer Raziel HaMalakh), the Zohar, and Jubilees.

- Araqiel (also Arkas, Arkiel, Arakiel, Araqael, Araciel, Arqael, Sarquael) taught humans the signs of the earth (geomancy). However, in the Sibylline Oracles, Araqiel is referred to not as a fallen angel, or watcher, but as one of the five angels who lead the souls of humans to judgment, the other four being Ramiel, Uriel, Samael, and Azazel.
- Armaros (also Amaros or Armoniel) in Enoch I taught humanity the resolving of enchantments (ambiguous but possibly spells and the undoing of them.)
- Azazel taught humans to make knives, swords, shields, and how to devise ornaments and cosmetics. (metallurgy, specifically in the context of war)
- Gadreel (or Gader'el) taught the art of cosmetics (camouflage), the use of weapons and killing blows (martial arts and weaponry).
- Baraqel (Baraqiel) taught the signs of the stars (astrology).
- Bezaliel mentioned in Enoch I, left out of most translations because of damaged manuscripts and problematic transmission of the text.
- Chazaqiel (sometimes Ezeqeel or Cambriel) taught humans the signs of the clouds (meteorology).
- Kokabiel (also Kakabel, Kochbiel, Kokbiel, Kabaiel, and Kochab), In the Book of Raziel he is a high-ranking, holy angel. In Enoch I, he is a fallen watcher, resident of the nether realms, and commands 365,000 surrogate spirits to do his bidding. Among other duties, he instructs his fellows in astrology.
- Penemue "taught mankind the art of writing with ink and paper," and taught "the children of men the bitter and the sweet and the secrets of wisdom." (I Enoch 69.8)
- Sariel (also Suriel) taught humankind about the courses of the moon (at one time regarded as forbidden knowledge).
- Samyaza (also Shemyazaz, Shamazya, Semiaza, Shemhazi, Semyaza and Amezyarak) is one of the leaders of the fall from heaven in Vocabulaire de l'Angelologie.
- Shamsiel, once a guardian of Eden as stated in the Zohar, served as one of the two chief aides to the archangel Uriel (the other aide being Hasdiel) when Uriel bore his standard into battle, and is the head of 365 legions of angels and also crowns prayers, accompanying them to the 5th heaven. In Jubilees, he is referred to as one of the Watchers. He is a fallen angel who teaches the signs of the sun.
- Yeqon or Jeqon (Hebrew: יָקוּם, romanized: Yaqum, lit. 'he shall rise') was the ringleader who first tempted the other Watchers into having sexual relations with humans. His accomplices were Asbeel, Gadreel, Penemue, and Kasdaye (or Kasadya), who were all identified as individual "satans".

The account of the Book of Enoch has been associated with the passage in Genesis 6:1–4, which speaks of Sons of God instead of Watchers:

When men began to multiply on earth and daughters were born to them, the sons of God saw how beautiful the daughters of man were, and so they took for their wives as many of them as they chose. Then the Lord said: "My spirit shall not remain in man forever, since he is but flesh. His days shall comprise one hundred and twenty years." At that time the Nephilim appeared on earth [{as well as later}], after the sons of God had intercourse with the daughters of man, who bore them sons. They were the heroes of old, the men of renown.

— Genesis 6:1–4

=== Second Book of Enoch ===
The pseudepigraphon Second Book of Enoch (Slavonic Enoch) refers to the Grigori, who are the same as the Watchers of 1 Enoch. The Slavic word Grigori used in the book is a transcription of the Greek word ἐγρήγοροι egrḗgoroi, meaning "wakeful". The Hebrew equivalent is ערים, meaning "waking", "awake".

Chapter 18 presents the Grigori as countless soldiers of human appearance, "their size being greater than that of great giants". They are located in the fifth heaven and identified as "the Grigori, who with their prince Satanail rejected the Lord of light". One version of 2 Enoch adds that their number was 200 myriads (2 million). Furthermore, some "went down on to earth from the Lord's throne" and there married women and "befouled the earth with their deeds", resulting in confinement underground. The number of those who descended to earth is generally put at three, but Andrei A. Orlov, while quoting the text as saying three, remarks in a footnote that some manuscripts put them at 200 or even 200 myriads.

Chapter 29, referring to the second day of creation, before the creation of human beings, says that "one from out the order of angels" or, according to other versions of 2 Enoch, "one of the order of archangels" or "one of the ranks of the archangels" "conceived an impossible thought, to place his throne higher than the clouds above the earth, that he might become equal in rank to [the Lord's] power. And [the Lord] threw him out from the height with his angels, and he was flying in the air continuously above the bottomless." Although in this chapter the name "Satanail" is mentioned only in a heading added in one manuscript, this chapter too is often understood to refer to Satanail and his angels, the Grigori.

The Mercer Dictionary of the Bible makes a distinction between the Grigori and the fallen angels by stating that in fifth heaven, Enoch sees "the giants whose brothers were the fallen angels."

The longer recension of 2 Enoch 18:3 identifies the prisoners of second heaven as the angels of Satanail.

== Other sources and traditions ==
=== The Book of Giants ===
The story of the Watchers is shown also in The Book of Giants.

=== The Book of Jubilees ===
The term "Watchers" occurs in The Book of Jubilees (Jub. 4:15, 5:1).

=== Damascus Document ===
A reference to the "fall of the watchers from heaven" is found in Hebrew in the Damascus Document 2:18 echoing 1 Enoch 13:10.

=== First Epistle to the Corinthians ===
1 Corinthians 11:10 ("For this reason a woman ought to have authority over her head, because of the angels."), according to the early Church Father Tertullian, refers to the Watchers. He taught that the lust of the Watchers was the reason for Saint Paul's directive to Christian women to wear a headcovering. Tertullian referenced the case of a woman who was touched on the neck by an angel "who found her to be a temptation".

=== Philo of Byblos ===
According to PrEv 1.10.1–2 of Philo of Byblos, Sanchuniathon mentioned "some living beings who had no perception, out of whom intelligent beings came into existence, and they were called Zophasemin (Heb. șōpē-šāmayim, that is, 'Watchers of Heaven'). And they were formed like the shape of an egg."

=== Kabbalah ===
The Zohar makes reference to the "watchers" of Nebuchadnezzar's dream.

=== Possible Babylonian/Aramaic origin ===
According to Jonathan Ben-Dov of the University of Tel Aviv, the myth of the watchers began in Lebanon when Aramaic writers tried to interpret the imagery on Mesopotamian stone monuments without being able to read their Akkadian text.

Amar Annus from the University of Tartu argues that the Watchers were intended as polemical representations of the Mesopotamian Apkallu, who gave wisdom to man before the Flood (which is portrayed as a corrupting influence in Enochian literature).

== Depictions in popular culture ==
There have been many different depictions of the Grigori in fiction and wider popular culture.

In Kevin Smith's 1999 religious satire Dogma, the character Bartleby (played by Ben Affleck) is mentioned to have formerly been a Watcher.

In Darren Aronofsky's 2014 Biblical epic Noah, there are a large number of Watchers and they are depicted as having been cast out of Heaven after deciding to help mankind.

In Traci Harding's book The Cosmic Logos, the Grigori are a group of fallen spiritual beings who watched over and assisted human spiritual evolution thus gaining the title "the Watchers".

Looking in on us from way out there, the protagonist of the Hawkwind song The Watcher from the 1972 album Doremi Fasol Latido feels his "sense all disgusted:" although man had the chance to do the right thing, "avarice destroyed your sphere." Convinced once more that we cannot be trusted as custodians of this world, the Watcher proclaims our fearful end.

In the Supernatural season 10 episode "Angel Heart" mentions the Grigori with one, Tamiel (under the name "Peter Holloway") appearing as the main enemy of the episode. At one point in this episode, a picture is shown that is implied to be a painting of a grigori—it is, in fact, a classic depiction of the archangel Michael besting Satan.

In the popular The Black Tapes podcast, Grigori are mentioned in Episode 105 titled "The Devil You Know".

In his Sigma Force novel The Bone Labyrinth (2015), James Rollins describes Atlantis' creators as Watchers, a superior hybrid species of early humans and neanderthals who disseminated knowledge and possibly interbred with people throughout the world. They also created the protected, hidden city of Atlantis, located in Ecuador.

In Lauren Kate's book Fallen, a group called 'The Watchers' studied angels who consorted with mortal women, but more closely, Daniel Grigori the sixth archangel.

In Darynda Jones' "Charley Davidson" series, Sean Foster is identified as nephilim, "part human, part angel ... descended from the union of a grigori and a human" (Eleventh Grave in Moonlight, 2017).

In Ichiei Ishibumi's Japanese light novel series High School DxD, the Grigori is an organisation of fallen angels, the leaders of which are some of the Watchers named in the Book of Enoch. Three of them play important roles in the story: Azazel is the Governor General of Grigori and becomes a major supporting character, Kokabiel is the main antagonist of Volume 3 and Baraqiel is the estranged father of Akeno Himejima, one of the main characters.

In El Shaddai: Ascension of the Metatron, many members of the Grigori are shown throughout the game as the main antagonists. To name a few: Azazel, Armaros, Arakiel, Baraqiel, and Semyaza.

In the English localization of the first Drakengard game, the overarching antagonists are semi-divine beings called "the Watchers." Though the game sometimes refers to them as "daemons," in the original Japanese text they are simply called angels. The English localization for the prequel, Drakengard 3, calls them angels as well.

In the original Dragon's Dogma, the dragon is called Grigori.

In City of Angels (1998), Nicolas Cage plays a watcher angel who falls in love with a human woman played by Meg Ryan. City of Angels is a loose American remake of Wim Wenders' 1987 German film Wings of Desire. The sequel to Wings of Desire is Faraway, So Close! (1993).

In Rafaél Nicolás novel Angels & Man (2024), a queer retelling of the Watcher’s Flood.

== See also ==
- Fallen angel
- Gibborim
- Guardian angel
- Igigi
- List of angels in theology
- Nephilim
- Dark Watchers

== General references ==
- Barker, Margaret (2005). The Lost Prophet: The Book of Enoch and Its Influence on Christianity. London, England: Sheffield Phoenix Press. ISBN 978-1905048182. Archived from the original on 2019-03-29.
- Barker, Margaret (2005). "Chapter 1: The Book of Enoch". The Older Testament: The Survival of Themes from the Ancient Royal Cult in Sectarian Judaism and Early Christianity. London, England: Sheffield Phoenix Press. ISBN 978-1905048199. Archived from the original on 30 March 2019.
- Boccaccini, Gabriele, ed. (2005). Enoch and Qumran origins : new light on a forgotten connection ([Nachdr.]. ed.). Grand Rapids, Michigan: W. B. Eerdmans. ISBN 0-8028-2878-7.
- Charlesworth, James H., ed. (2010). The Old Testament pseudepigrapha. Peabody, Massachusetts: Hendrickson. ISBN 978-1-59856-491-4.
- Hernández, Valencia Juan S. (2024). "Influence of the Enochic tradition on Qumran: reception and adaptation of the Watchers and Giants as a case study", Perseitas 12, pp. 34–71.
- DDD, Karel van der Toorn, Bob Becking, Pieter W. van der Horst (1998). Dictionary of deities and demons in the Bible (DDD) (2., extensively rev. ed.). Leiden: Brill. ISBN 90-04-11119-0.
- Meadowcroft, T. J. (1995). Aramaic Daniel and Greek Daniel : a literary comparison. Sheffield: Sheffield Acad. Press. ISBN 1-85075-551-5.
- Nickelsburg, George W.E. (2004). 1 Enoch : a new translation : based on the Hermeneia commentary. Minneapolis, Minnesota: Fortress Press. ISBN 0-8006-3694-5.
- Orlov, Andrei A. (2011). Dark mirrors : Azazel and Satanael in early Jewish demonology. Albany, New York: State University of New York Press. ISBN 978-1-4384-3951-8.
- Platt, Rutherford H. (2004). Forgotten Books of Eden (Reprint ed.). Forgotten Books. p. 239. ISBN 1-60506-097-6.
- Porteous, Norman W. (1965). Daniel : a commentary. Philadelphia, Pennsylvania: Westminster Press. ISBN 0-664-22317-6.
- SDA Commentary on Daniel (1980). Commentary on Daniel and the Revelation : from the Seventh-day Adventist Bible Commentary (Reprint ed.). Hagerstown, Maryland: Review and Herald Pub. Association. ISBN 0-8280-2380-8.
