= Angels (Neon Genesis Evangelion) =

Entities from Neon Genesis Evangelion

Lilith, the second Angel, originally introduced as Adam. Staff added it during the production of the series after studying Christianity.

The Angels (使徒, shito; lit. 'apostles') are fictional entities from the anime television series Neon Genesis Evangelion, which was produced by Gainax studio and directed by Hideaki Anno. The Angels also appear in the manga adaptation of the same name, which was illustrated by Yoshiyuki Sadamoto.

In the original animated work, almost all of the Angels are antagonists of mankind who repeatedly try to reach the headquarters of the special agency Nerv in the city of Tokyo-3. Most of the Angels originate from an entity called Adam, but the eighteenth specimen, humanity, is descended from Lilith, the second Angel. To counter the Angels' invasion, Nerv builds the Evangelions, mechas that possess a force field called an AT Field, which the Angels also use to defend themselves.

The Angels appear in works from the animated series, in spin-off manga, video games, visual novels, in the yonkoma manga Petit Eva: Evangelion@School, and the Rebuild of Evangelion film tetralogy. The names of the Angels past Adam and Lilith, which are revealed in the fourteenth and twenty-third episodes of the series, refer to the namesake angels of non-canonical Judeo-Christian tradition. The characteristics and functions of each Angel are deliberately similar to those of their namesakes in ancient sacred texts. Their designs have been praised by critics and animation enthusiasts, and influenced subsequent animated series.

== Conception ==
Sadamoto's original draft depicting the Angel Sachiel

During the making of Neon Genesis Evangelion, the production staff decided to set the work on a battle between gods and humans. In one early draft, which was published about two years before airing, Gainax included enemies named Apostolos (アポストロ, aposutoro), which they conceived as ancient relics scattered all over the globe and left in hibernation by a species called "First Ancestral Race" (第1始祖民族, dai'ichi shiso minzoku). These enemies were referred to as simple weapons with almost no biological component. According to Gualtiero Cannarsi, the editor who was in charge of the first Italian-language edition of the series, the Gainax studio members might have been inspired by James P. Hogan's Giants series, Arthur C. Clarke's short story "The Sentinel" and its film adaptation 2001: A Space Odyssey (1968). The Apostolos would have been the servants and apostles of the giant Adam, the divine sentinel of a distant alien race formed long before humanity, drawing on Hogan's evolutionary and science fiction themes. Anno also drew inspiration from classic carnivorous kaiju such as Gyaos from the Gamera franchise and Gaira from the 1966 film The War of the Gargantuas. A similar scenario with ancient superior civilizations can be found in Hayao Miyazaki's manga Nausicaä of the Valley of the Wind and Anno's previous work Nadia: The Secret of Blue Water.

The original authors intended there to have been twenty-eight enemies, the first of which, Adam, would have been found in the Dead Sea region but destroyed in an explosion fifteen years before the events of the series. The initial scenario also included the introduction of two Apostolos named Shateiel (シャテイエル, Shateieru), which was described as the "Angel of silence", and Turel (テゥレル, Tureru), "the rock of God". Writer Virginie Nebbia compared Turel's design with the Emperor Neo mask from Nadia: The Secret of Blue Water. The project was shelved during production, but the ideas were recycled for the Angels Ramiel and Sahaquiel. The first episode would have featured a confrontation between Eva-01, piloted by Rei, and a "metal Angel" named Raziel which would have had anthropomorphic features similar to those of a giant. In the twenty-fourth episode, titled "Now, the Promised Time" (今、契約時間, ima, keiyaku jikan), there would be a great lunar battle against twelve Apostolos; humans would realize their helplessness in the face of their enemies' overwhelming superiority, and "the promised time" would approach. Evangelion Chronicle, an official encyclopedia about the series, noted that the number twelve reflects the number of the apostles mentioned in the book of Revelation; the encyclopedia also compared the initial scenario to the battle against the nine Mass Production Model Evangelions in the 1997 theatrical conclusion.

Another scenario planned two ancient prehistoric civilizations equipped with advanced technology appearing on Earth before the appearance of humanity. The first of the two, known as the "First Ancestral Race", would create artificial humanoid Evangelions, which would then rebel against their creators, causing their extinction. A "Second Ancestral Race" would then create the Spear of Longinus in an attempt to defeat them, scattering the dormant Angels around the globe in case anyone tried to reactivate the humanoids. Moreover, in a draft of the twentieth episode of the series, Misato would mention the origin of the enemies, saying, "I know the Angels aren't just weapons left behind by the First Indigenous Race" (使徒は第1先住民族の残したただの戦闘兵器ではない事は、わかっているわ). According to Nebbia, staff took inspiration both from Nadia and Nausicaä of the Valley of the Wind for the scenario, in which ancient civilizations are destroyed by their own creations, while for the opposition between Adam and Lilith, Gainax may have possibly took clue from the works of artist Daijirō Morohoshi. Nebbia also compared the Angels' red core with Ultraman's Color Timer, and the AT Field to the Ideon's barrier from Space Runaway Ideon. Writer Alexandre Marine noted how Angels role can be traced to Ultraman, in which Zarab aleins or Imitation Ultra are represented as evil copies of the titular character. Wired also compared the Evangelion dichotomy of Angels as powerful beings with the fruit of life and humans as beings with the fruit of knowledge to Super Dimension Fortress Macross, in which the human species is born to spread culture and the Zentradi to fight.

The original ending would have revealed ancient ruins of a place called Arqa (アルカ, Aruka) at the bottom of Nerv, a name referring to one of the levels of the Jewish underworld. Writer Alexandre Marine in particular compared the original scenario to the dismantling of the Tower of Babel seen in Nadia - The Secret of Blue Water. Other elements of the original scenario also recall Hayao Miyazaki's Castle in the Sky (1986). According to the academic Taro Igarashi, Arqa ruins possibly become Nerv's base in the final script, which Fuyutsuki describes as a perfectly round cave. For Igarashi, this means the geofront is "some sort of ancient ruin" itself. Animator Mitsuo Iso proposed further ideas. Many tiles, objects into which the Arqans would have transcribed their personalities, would have been found in Arqa. Another proposal included multiple Arqas: one in Japan and one in Antarctica, which was actually supposed to be "the Antarctic underground kingdom discovered by Nazi Germany". Iso's scenario also envisioned a substance called Adamah, found in areas particularly important for human evolution, such as the Great Rift Valley in Africa or Qumran. Only a few ideas for the final battle on Arqa partially survived into the final version. Iso proposed having the Angels and Gendo unite at the Tree of Life in the final episode, despite having no idea exactly what the final twelve Angels would look like at the time. The fusion scene, similar to insemination or pollination, was compared by Iso himself to Jack and the Beanstalk, and would have featured the Angels as sperm fertilizing the Arqa egg. Iso's Angels, initially immobile like church statues, would have presented themselves as "messengers from the land of Nun"; the final twelve Angels, unlike the others, would have been the original inhabitants of Arqa. Adam would have been "impregnated," with Shinji inside him like a fetus who is then reborn. The Moon would have shattered. Iso suggested the idea that Angels are beings who experience various forms of existence, humanity being one of these forms, and that Angels learn from their battles against humanity. For example, he conceived Turel's bomb attack as a suicide attack that was intended to benefit the next Angel.

Mahiro Maeda drew Gaghiel and Israfel, while Yoshitō Asari designed Sachiel, Shamshel, and Zeruel. The artists avoided giving them anthropomorphic designs, which would have been more challenging during production. In the first two episodes, in which Sachiel appears, the staff had enough resources to hire animators, but for the fifth and sixth they already changed course. In the final version of the show, the Angels were renamed and indicated in the characters' dialogue with the word Shito (使徒; lit. 'apostles'), after Jesus' twelve disciples, rather than the term Tenshi (天使), with which the angels of the Christian tradition are usually indicated. Within the series' narrative, Gainax chose to use the English translation for Angel, "messenger", which is written in Latin characters and is readable in graphemes and written in overlays, as in the case of Nerv's computers. Michael House, the only American member of Gainax, protested about the juxtaposition of the two terms, but Hideaki Anno decided to keep the dual naming of the enemies. In one early draft of the series, the Nerv's supercomputer, the Magi System, would assign a name to each Angel. The director gave general guidelines for the design of each Angel. Their shapes became reflections of the feelings of Anno's generation, reflecting the climate of Japan in the 1990s. During the broadcast of the series, the Japanese economy and society were perceived in the country as inherently corrupt and decadent, with no one being able to trace the causes, making the concept of "enemy" ambiguous. The enemy of twentieth-century Japan, according to Anno, was neither political nor defined, as in the case of the religious sect Aum Shinrikyō, which in March 1995 attacked the Tokyo subway with sarin gas. The Angels and the character Gendo Ikari were represented as amorphous beings, since for the director the concept of "enemy" is per sé undefined.

== Characteristics ==
Angels are organic beings whose atomic structure has both particle and wave nature, and therefore characterized by the wave-particle duality of light. At the beginning of the series, their objectives and identity are unknown. but they are all attracted by an Angel – called Lilith – that is locked in the deepest section of the Nerv's headquarters, the Terminal Dogma. Academic Cristophe Thouny described them as "polymorphous figures of destruction that mark irruption of the world into the everyday, the opening of the social structure to alterity and death". The Angels' genetic makeup has a 99.89% affinity with that of humans. They can change shape from vaguely anthropomorphic to that of a geometric solid, and equally variable sizes. Many are equipped with a red sphere known as the "core" or "sphere of light", which is also their main source of energy and weakness. The "fruit of life", an organ of unknown nature, is responsible for their regenerative abilities. Humanity, the last example of an Angel, has the "fruit of knowledge" instead.

Angels have the universal ability to generate a force field called the Absolute Terror Field, or simply AT Field, which is similar to that of Evangelion units and makes them nearly indestructible. Their names and attacks have been prophesied in the Dead Sea Scrolls, ancient documents in the possession of a secret organization called Seele. The reason they appear in Tokyo-3 one at a time, never attacking collectively, is unknown. In the opening sequence of the seventeenth episode, "Fourth Child", Nerv director Gendō Ikari says the Angels "are beginning to attain intelligence". According to academic Satoshi Tsukamoto, the sentence means that the Angels "are attempting to acquire abilities to compete against human beings and control them". Writer Kitamura similarly stated that the Angels gradually make progress in communicating with the Evas they fight and send messages to Shinji during the series. According to a guide on the series contained in a manual for the card game Neon Genesis Evangelion RPG (新世紀エヴァンゲリオンRPG, Shinseiki Evangerion RPG), there is a connection between the Angels; each Angel seems to be an evolutionary outgrowth of the previous one, and the fact they attack one at a time suggests they are aware of the status of each of the other specimens and react accordingly.

== In Neon Genesis Evangelion ==
=== Adam ===
Adam (アダム, Adamu) is the progenitor of most of the Angels. It is represented as a giant of light with features similar to those of an Evangelion. A research team named the Katsuragi expedition, led by Misato Katsuragi's father, finds Adam in Antarctica and begins to examine its energy source, the S^{2} engine. The scientists of the expedition accidentally awaken Adam as a result of a contact experiment, causing a planetary catastrophe known as the Second Impact to occur. Half of the human population dies, and Adam is reduced to an embryonic state. Behind the event is the secret organization Seele, which is devoted to the search for the "path to Adam Kadmon". Agent Ryoji Kaji transports Adam to the Nerv headquarters, handing it over to the commander of the agency, Gendo Ikari. Adam's soul is incorporated in the seventeenth Angel, Tabris, while its embryo is implanted into Gendo's body. Adam is cloned and used as a basis to build the Evangelions, with the only exception of Eva Unit 01, created from Lilith.

Its name comes from the Biblical Adam. In the Book of Genesis, God creates Eve, the first woman, from Adam. In the twenty-first episode of Neon Genesis Evangelion, it is revealed that the Evas were similarly created from Adam. In the Jewish Kabbalah, Adam is described as a kind of deity, a being that is capable of giving life and as an entity to which all things are destined to return at the end of time. According to writers Kazuhisa Fujie and Martin Foster, in the series Kaworu Nagisa states that "those who come from Adam must return to Adam" referring to this tradition. Writer Virginie Nebbia compared Adam's arrival on the White Moon to that of Bemular, Ultraman's very first enemy, on a blue sphere. According to Nebbia, Adam's luminescent appearance during the Second Impact also recalls that of the giant of light from Ultraman 80.

Critic Marc MacWilliams noted Evangelion's Adam is portrayed as a giant being of light "as portrayed again in Kabbalistic texts before his Fall". Scholar Gavin McDowell similarly noted that biblical Adam is said to have first existed in "a gigantic, luminous, quasi-divine state", which he loses at the moment of his sin. Academic Fabio Bartoli likened Adam's role to the Kabbalistic concept of Adam Kadmon; in Hermetic terminology, Adam Kadmon refers to humanity in a state of mental and spiritual perfection. He is also described in Kabbalah as an androgynous being. In the twenty-fourth episode of the series, Kaworu Nagisa describes Adam as the "mother" of all Angels. Carl Gustav Horn similarly noted, "the Kabbalistic view is that all other creatures without exception – even the angels and archangels – are based on Adam (Kadamon) but were left incomplete: only Adam (of Genesis) was a complete image of the Divine". A being named Adam was also introduced by Gainax in the series Nadia. In one of Mitsuo Iso's proposals, Adam would have been discovered by the Essenes, a Jewish sect particularly scrupulous about excrements, known for having their latrines kilometers away from Qumran; from Adam's excrement would have been born a man later known as John (ヨハネ, Yohane).

=== Lilith ===
Lilith (リリス, Ririsu) is the second Angel. It is kept in the Terminal Dogma, the deepest section of the Nerv headquarters. Lilith's face is covered with a mask on which are drawn the seven eyes of a symbol called the Seele emblem. Lilith has the appearance of an anthropomorphic giant whose hands are nailed to a cross. Instead of lower limbs, it has small, humanoid legs. Lilith is pierced on the cross by a weapon called the Spear of Longinus. The soul of the Angel is kept inside Rei Ayanami. In the film The End of Evangelion (1997), the Angel's body unites with Rei, takes on the form of a giant Ayanami, and grows to the size of the Earth, developing a giant anti-AT Field and starting the Third Impact, an event in which the souls of all human beings merge into one being. Writer Gerald Miller noted that just as the intercourse between Adam and Eve was the genesis of humankind's lineage in the Judeo-Christian story, so does the union of Adam and Lilith lead to "a new genesis for humankind".

Lilith, according to the video game Neon Genesis Evangelion 2, arrived by chance on Earth in a celestial object called Black Moon, also called Lilith's Egg, which along with a White Moon of Adam was sent by an alien "First Ancestral Race". According to the video game Classified Informations, the First Ancestral Race, billions of years before the series, sent seven Moons into the universe with seven beings called the Seeds of Life, including Adam and Lilith, seven objects to contain them named Spears of Longinus and instruction manuals named Dead Sea Scrolls. The First Race did not plan for two Seeds to co-exist on the same planet or Lilith to arrive on Earth; so the progenies of Adam and Lilith clash for survival. The Angels are thus the legitimate successors of Adam and the original inhabitants of Earth. Lilith's accidental arrival on Earth caused the First Impact four billions before Second Impact, the destruction of its Lance and the formation of the Moon. The video game also says, "Some [Angels] were trying to access Lilith and reset all life, some of them had nothing in mind, and some were trying to recover their progenitor Adam". Evangelion Impacts constitute a reference to the actual giant-impact hypothesis.

Its name comes from Lilith, Adam's first wife. According to Jewish legends, demons called Lilim were born from their union. The Angel Lilith's design was elaborated upon by Mitsuo Iso. According to character designer Yoshiyuki Sadamoto, the original scenario did not include Lilith, which was introduced following the airing of the series and some staff research on Christianity because "not touching Lilith seemed to hurt Anno's pride". Scholar Gavin McDowell argued that The End of Evangelion deliberately overturns the Judeo-Christian tradition by presenting Lilith as the progenitor of humanity rather than demons and the Angels as Earth's original life forms, while human beings assume the role of extraterrestrial "invaders". McDowell also likened the giant Lilith with "the androgynous, hermaphroditic Adam described in rabbinic literature". Writer Virginie Nebbia compared Lilith's arrival on Black Moon to Ultraman's arrival on a red sphere in the series of the same name. She also compared the eyes of Lilith's mask to the design of Kemur from Ultra Q or to Marilupa's mask from Miyazaki's Nausicaä of the Valley of the Wind. In the episode "Rei III", the image of two giants without the lower part of their bodies and merged to each other is visible; according to Gainax, it represents Lilith and Eva-01 around the period of Yui Ikari's disappearance.

Iso designed the cross of Lilith, then called Adam, with a regular crystalline structure, intending it to be made of a special material that could withstand Adam's force field. He drew the seven eyes of the face following the director's instructions. In the original sketches, Iso also added graphemes corresponding to the angel's hands. Lilith was originally supposed to be deformed and have a swollen abdomen, similar to that of a pregnant woman, but the author rejected anything that might suggest deformity or disability. The idea of the mutilated lower body came to Iso, and as Iso himself noted, Mamoru Oshii's works also feature characters with similar lower bodies. In the Rebuild of Evangelion tetralogy, Lilith is present from the beginning. Misato shows Lilith to Shinji before the battle against Ramiel. In the saga, Lilith's aspect has been modified by animator Okama and Hideaki Anno: in Evangelion 1.0 (2007) Lilith has scars on its chest, the result of scientific experiments; its mask is similar to that of the Angel Sachiel. Lilith, along with Rei and Eva-01, has been compared to the Jungian archetype of the Great Mother, the feminine authority that represents protection, fertility, darkness, and an inescapable abyss. Its role can also be likened to the astrological concept of the Black Moon, which is also named Lilith. Scholar Gavin McDowell noted that, in the Rebuild of Evangelion films, the Black Moon also conspicuously resembles the Holy Grail.

=== Sachiel ===
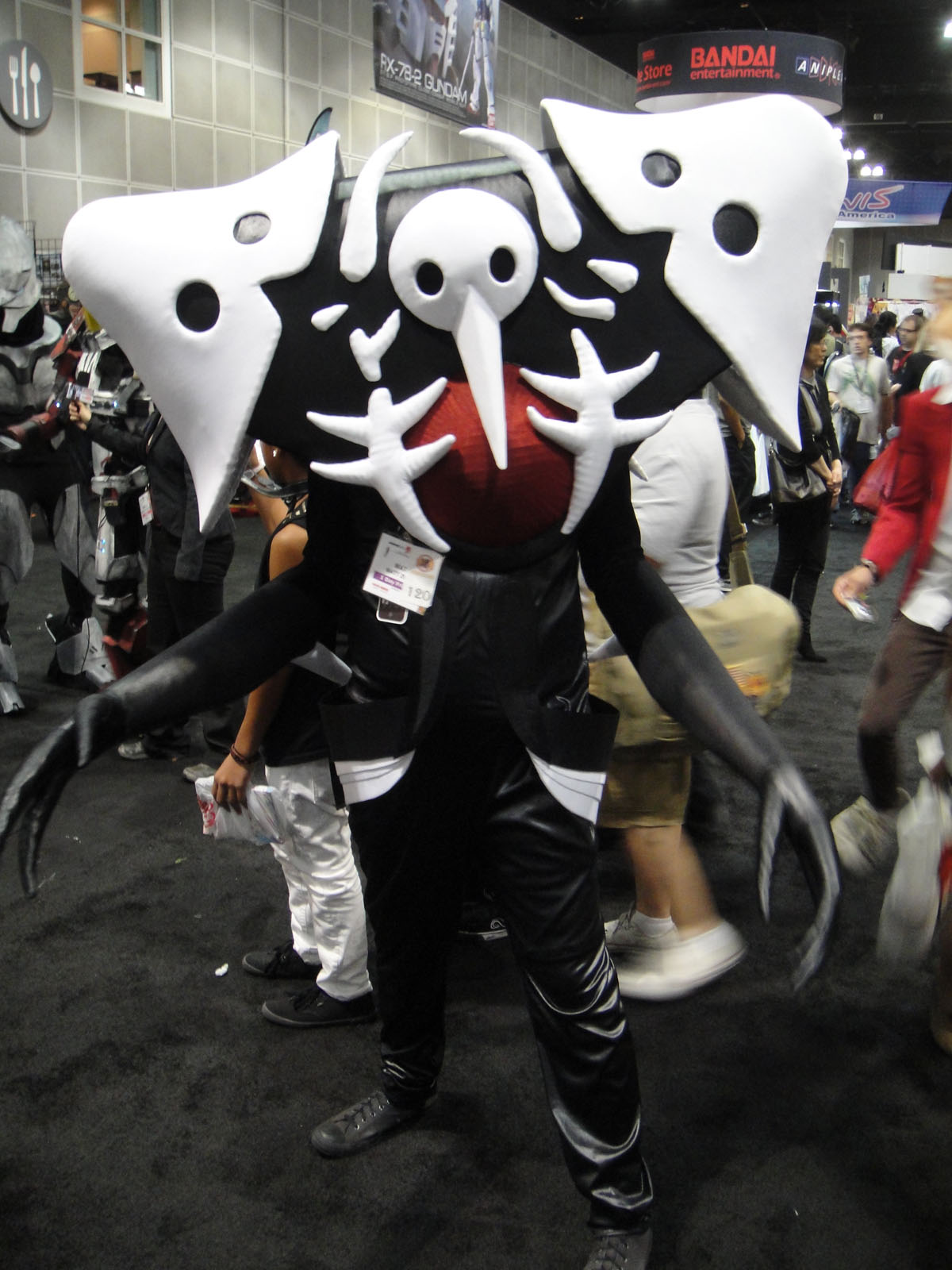
A cosplayer portrays Sachiel at the Anime Expo 2011.

Sachiel (サキエル, Sakieru), the third Angel, has an anthropomorphic appearance. On the upper part of its trunk, it has a disk that is similar to a face, while on the outer sides of the legs it has two gills. Once on land, the armed forces of the United Nations attack Sachiel, which can survive the UN's most powerful weapon, the N^{2} mine. The attack damages Sachiel's face and temporarily stops its advance. Sachiel then regenerates and replaces its face with a second face. After the crash, Sachiel learns how fighter aircraft work and can replicate their effectiveness, developing the ability to launch explosive light beams. It can also use a pair of "protractile spears" or "spears of light" incorporated into the forearms. In the second episode, "The Beast", Sachiel fights with Eva-01, which goes into a berserk mode and manages to defeat the Angel. Eva-01 neutralizes Sachiel's AT Field, and Sachiel commits suicide by self-destructing.

Its name comes from Sachiel, the angel of water. Sachiel is considered a cherubim who protects the tree of life with spears of fire according to the Old Testament, a detail that possibly inspired the fictional Angel's protractible spears. Academics Sellés de Lucas and Hernández-Pérez linked its second face to the Book of Ezekiel, where cherubims are described as having four heads. The authors initially intended the Angel to fight at sea against Unit 02 in the eighth episode "Asuka Strikes!", but this idea was set aside and used for Gaghiel. Writer Dennis Redmond described it as a "strangely abstract, gilled creature" and a "neo-Expressionistic Godzilla". Sachiel is based on Ishtar, an android that appears in the manga Wahhaman by Yoshitō Asari; its back is inspired by that of a cat. Writer Virginie Nebbia also compared its design to Jamila from Ultraman and King Bockle from Return of Ultraman. At the storyboard stage, Sachiel's figure had different connotations and its fight was similar to the Ultraman battles. During the second half of the battle, Sachiel was supposed to wield an arrow, which it would drive into Eva-01's head. In Rebuild of Evangelion, Sachiel is known as the fourth Angel. The animators superimposed images of a light reflecting on an expanse of water and one of the Milky Way on its luminescent core.

=== Shamshel ===
Shamshel (シャムシェル, Shamusheru), the fourth Angel, has an insect-like appearance and its form fuses that of a mollusk and that of a cetacean. Although it has limbs, Shamshel slowly flies at low altitude, to avoid detection by Nerv radar equipment. Shamshel uses two weapons that are similar to luminescent whips and have high cutting capabilities, being able to pierce the abdomen of Eva-01 in battle. Shamshel is shot down by Unit 01, which pierces it with a weapon called Prog-Knife. According to Ritsuko Akagi, the DNA map of the Angel corresponds with 99.89% of that of human DNA.

It's named after Shamsiel, who is believed to be the angel of the day. The name, according to official sources, is an allusion to its fight with Unit 01, which takes place in daylight and ends just before sunset. Its appearance is similar to that of an Alien Bira from Ultraseven, and is inspired by that of a creature called "the three-meter extraterrestrial", whose garage kit was made by a Gainax-associated company called General Products. Its battle took inspiration from the Ultraman battles by director Akio Jissōji. Shamshel was originally meant to have arms that transformed into shields capable of deflecting projectiles, and during the battle it would have attacked Eva-01 with a knifehand strike, In Rebuild of Evangelion, Shamshel is known as the fifth Angel. Shamsiel's torso opens into a set of articulating ribs that claw the air like crab legs.

=== Ramiel ===
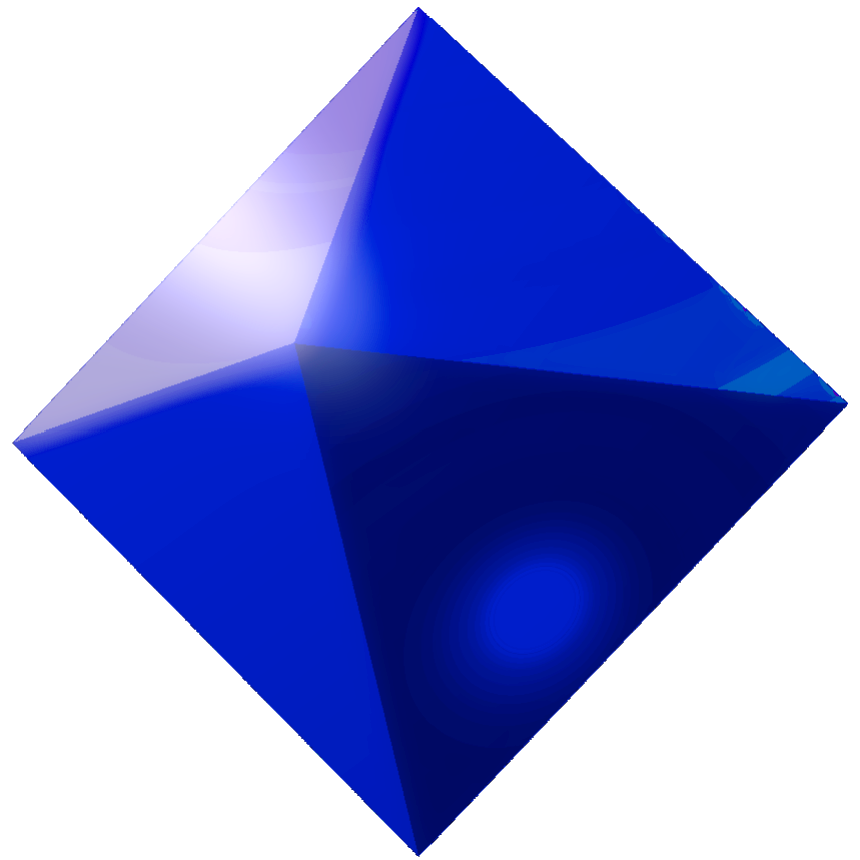
Ramiel's main form is that of a huge, dark blue octahedron.

Ramiel (ラミエル, Ramieru) is the fifth Angel. Its body is a regular octahedron. A 17.5-meter (57 ft) wide drill, which pierces the strong armor of the underground Nerv headquarters, extends from the lower body. Ramiel is equipped with a strong AT Field and an accelerated-particle cannon, which, exploiting the collision of subatomic particles, emits a powerful beam of photons due to an inner torus reactor. Ramiel's core, unlike those of previous Angels, is located inside its body, overcoming the biggest weakness of its predecessors and revealing the existence of a direct link between the Angels. In the fifth episode, "Rei I", Ramiel strikes Eva-01 with its light beam before its exit to the surface. To face the threat, in the episode "Rei II" Misato Katsuragi conceives a strategy called Operation Yashima to destroy Ramiel, involving both Eva-01 and Eva-00. The fight concludes once Eva-01 hits Ramiel with a positron cannon, permanently destroying it.

As a source of inspiration for Ramiel, the authors took the monster Pris-Ma (プリズ魔, Purizu-Ma) from Return of Ultraman. Anime News Network's Lynzee Loveridge described Ramiel's design as "Anno's shout out to Future Police Urashiman", while Yasutaka Yoshimura compared it with some abstract shapes in the final scenes of Stanley Kubrick's film 2001: A Space Odyssey. For writer Alexandre Marine its shape can be a reference to Nadia's pendant from The Secret of Blue Water. It is named after Ramiel, whose name means "thunder of God", in reference to its particle cannon. Initially, in correspondence of each face of the octahedron Ramiel would have had a solid, floating, triangular shape and its beam of light would have used positrons. In Rebuild of Evangelion, Ramiel is known as the sixth Angel and possesses the ability to transform its regular octahedron form into a variety of solids. For its Rebuild design, the staff took inspiration from the depiction of the microorganism Andromeda in Robert Wise's science fiction film The Andromeda Strain and an image that Takashi Watabe drew twenty years earlier which depicts a four-dimensional body moving in a three-dimensional world.

=== Gaghiel ===
Gaghiel (ガギエル, Gagieru), the sixth Angel, appears in "Asuka Strikes!" in the Pacific Ocean and goes to attack the UN fleet, which is transporting Eva-02 and Adam's embryo. Gaghiel resembles an aquatic creature; its body has fin-like appendages and a hydrodynamic shape, allowing it to quickly move through water. The upper body has a face identical to the faces of Sachiel. The Angel attacks the naval fleet using the bulk of its body, sinking ships. When approaching its targets, it opens its mouth and squeezes its enemies in its jaws. Gaghiel's core, unlike those of previous Angels, is located inside the mouth.

During the fight, Gaghiel jumps onto the aircraft carrier Over the Rainbow and moves to attack Eva-02, leading the Angel and Eva to crash into the sea in the Itō area. Its body is 600 meters (2,000 feet) long. Eva-02 neutralizes the Angel's AT Field and opens its mouth to allow two armored warships, which were evacuated and sunk with the Kingston valves, to penetrate its jaws and fire on the Angel's core. The operation is successful and Gaghiel is defeated by Asuka Langley Soryu and Shinji Ikari. The behavior of the Angel, which appeared at sea away from Tokyo-3, is attributable to the presence of the first Angel Adam on the ships of the fleet.

The name Gaghiel (Hebrew: גגיאל), also called Gagiel, Daghiel or Dagiel, in Judeo-Christian folklore is the angel of the fish. Its Hebrew name can be translated as "roaring beast of God", and has been interpreted by writer Will Raus as a possible allusion to its appearance, which is similar to that of a beast fighting in the water.

=== Israfel ===
Israfel (イスラフェル, Isuraferu) is the seventh Angel. Asuka Langley Soryu, aboard her Eva-02, strikes it with its Sonic Glaive splitting it in half. After the attack, the Angel regenerates into two parts, both of which are able to fight individually. Israfel attacks and defeats the two mechas, which return to their base to await a second confrontation. Following their first defeat, the UN armed forces attack Israfel, the two parts of which they nickname Kō and Otsu. Thanks to the use of N² weapons, the UN can temporarily stop its advance. The only way to defeat Israfel, according to Misato, is "a double coordinated attack on its core"; between the two parts of the divided Angel is a bond that allows Kō and Otsu to share their behaviors and vulnerability. After a regeneration process, the Angel merges, regains its original form, and again begins its advance. In the second clash with the units, Israfel imitates the weapons used against it in the first battle, launching rays with high destructive potential against the Eva and using its upper limbs as blades. During the fight, Eva-01 and Eva-02, moving in synchronization, attack the Angel. Israfel splits again, and the two units jump into the sky, launching a synchronized kick that destroys its cores.

The seventh Angel is named after the messenger of music and resurrection, Israfil (Arabic: إسرافيل), a detail related to the musical attack of Eva-01 and 02. According to Will Raus, Israfel's role of resurrection could allude to the Angel's ability to split. The terms Kō and Otsu come from the series of Heavenly Stems. Writer Virginie Nebbia compared Israfel with Pestar from Ultraman. Its capacity of fission and brightness have been compared with those of a single-cell organism and mercury.

=== Sandalphon ===
Sandalphon (サンダルフォン, Sandarufon), the eighth Angel, is detected inside the volcanic crater of Mount Asama in a human-embryo-like state and enclosed in a chrysalis. The Nerv decides to attempt to capture it, but the being awakens during the attempt and quickly mutates. Gualtiero Cannarsi, editor of the first Italian adaptation of the series, compared its adult form with the Limanda fish. Sandalphon collides with Eva-02, demonstrating high levels of physical endurance. Its core is concealed within its body and is not visible to observers. During the fight, Asuka and other Nerv members use the concept of thermal expansion to develop a plan to defeat it. Eva-02, using a coolant in its equipment, causes Sandalphon to undergo thermal constriction, resulting in damage to its body structure.

The fictional Angel's name alludes to Sandalphon, the angel of embryos. During its metamorphosis into its adult form, the producers included a plaintive background voice using the electronically distorted howls of an infant. The Angel's design took inspiration from prehistoric creatures such as the trilobite and the Anomalocaris. The idea of an enemy-capture attempt was planned for the eleventh episode, but moved to the tenth during the production. According to a guide on the original series included with the Neon Genesis Evangelion RPG card game, the Sandalphon episode suggests that dormant, larval Angels are hidden around the world. An official encyclopedia on the series links its appearance with the biblical Book of Enoch, in which the word "Heaven", the abode of angels, actually refers to an Earthly location; because Sandalphon is discovered in the magma chamber of a volcano, Evangelion Angels similarly exist "in the same world as ours". According to writer Virginie Nebbia, for Sandalphon's battle staff took inspiration from the novel Sundiver.

=== Matarael ===
The ninth Angel, Matarael (マトリエル, Matorieru), resembles an arthropod arachnid chelicerate. Unlike arthropods, it has a single central body, from the top of which extends four oversized legs, making it akin to the opilionid subclass. The main body is similar to a geometric solid obtained from the section of an ellipsoid, reminiscent of an upside-down turtle. Nine human-eye-like drawings are evident on its main body. The eyes are arranged in an equilateral triangle, and one of them is placed at the center of the body's lower section; from the central eye it pours a corrosive liquid on its enemies. The acid is likely produced by an exocrine gland inside the Angel. Once ashore, Matarael invades Tokyo-3 and decides to penetrate Nerv by corroding an armored portcullis leading to the organization's headquarters. The Angel pours its acid into the wells dug in the sixth episode of the series by the Angel Ramiel, and its strategy suggests it is mindful of its predecessor's actions. It clashes with Eva 00, 01 and 02, which defeat it with gunfire.

The name Matarael (Hebrew:מטראל) comes from the Book of Enoch, which describes it as the angel of rain. The name of Evangelion's Matarael refers to its offensive strategy and its powerful, corrosive acid, which it rains on its enemies.

=== Sahaquiel ===
Sahaquiel (サハクィエル, Sahakwieru), the tenth Angel, appears in Earth's orbit above the Indian Ocean using its body as a bomb. Its symmetrical body shape is similar to that of some single-celled organisms such as amoebas. On its body are three geometric figures that resemble the human eye, with a big central eye in which the core is located. Before attacking the Nerv headquarters, Sahaquiel detaches some small portions of its main mass that are equipped with an AT Field, and hurls them to the ground to correct its trajectory. Gualtiero Cannarsi compared its ability to divide with the budding of protozoa and mesozoa. It can materially interfere with Nerv's military equipment, destroying a research satellite and jamming enemy ground communications. Its destruction requires the collaboration of all the three Evas owned by Nerv. Once it arrives at Tokyo-3, Sahaquiel is jammed by Unit 01, while its AT Field is breached by Unit 00. Eva-02 destroys its core, defeating it.

For Sahaquiel staff took inspiration from the angel of the same name, the angel of the sky and guardian of the fourth heaven of Paradise, which is referenced in the fictional Angel's aerial attack strategy. The connection with the biblical Sahaquiel's guardian function is realized in its elongated shape, which resembles that of a deformed eye. The name Sahaquiel (Hebrew: סהקיאל) is translatable as "Ingenuity of God", which Will Rauss interpreted as a possible allusion to the Angel's uses of its AT Field. Its design was inspired by surrealist art. In the initial draft, Sahaquiel had a sharp, string-shaped body similar to Armisael's. Sadamoto drew the Angel to show Evangelion's enemies may not always be anthropomorphic, like Seele.

In Rebuild of Evangelion, Sahaquiel is known as the eighth Angel. Its design by Mahiro Maeda has several changes; in the movie Evangelion 2.0, its AT Field is powerful enough to distort the path of light and its body, which was initially spherical, unravels and changes shape, revealing silhouettes of humans on its surface. At the bottom of its main body, Sahaquiel develops an anthropomorphic entity that pierces Unit 01's hands with spear-like weapons, which were designed by director Takeshi Honda. Masayuki suggested having Sahaquiel die in a wave of blood that floods Tokyo-3, which was inspired by the tokusatsu tradition and the scene in which Sapporo collapses in Japan Sinks (1974).

=== Ireul ===
Ireul (イロウル, Irouru) is the eleventh Angel, which first manifests itself as corrosive stains on a wall of the Nerv headquarters. At this early stage, Ireul behaves as an obligate anaerobic bacterium. Nerv attempts but fails to eradicate Ireul by increasing the presence of ozone in the air, but Ireul starts a fast evolution process which allows it to resist to ozone. Ireul is a rational virus and a biological microprocessor, a colony of microscopic nanomachine-sized individuals rather than a single Angel. These singularities, similar to bacteria, are united in an agglomeration that quickly evolves radically to take on the form of a computer. Ireul hacks and seeks the access code to the three Magi supercomputers, the most important part of the structure, to activate a program of self-destruction at the headquarters. Dr. Ritsuko Akagi devises a "reverse hacking" strategic plan, believing it is better to increase the enemy's evolution and insert a program to make Ireul choose to coexist with the Magi System. Ritsuko's program defeats Ireul, saving Nerv's headquarters.

Mitsuo Iso suggested a battle against an invisible enemy and the basic plot. In religious texts, Ireul, or Yeruel or Yroul, is referred to as the angel of fear. Writer Will Raus interpreted the sense of dread felt by Nerv members during its attack as a reference to the biblical angel. Evangelion Chronicle encyclopedia likened the Angel's program of self-extinction to cellular apoptosis, while coexistence with the Magi System to a form of symbiosis. Ireul's properties, such as self-replication, are similar to those of a universal molecular assembler.

=== Leliel ===
Leliel (レリエル, Rerieru) appears as a black-and-white-streaked floating sphere and a black shadow. The spherical body is its true shadow, while the apparent shadow on the ground is the main body. The Angel is 680 meters (2,230 ft) wide and 3 nanometers (1.2×10^{−7} in) thick. It extends its AT Field in the vicinity of its enemy, a process that coincides with the manifestation of the apparent shadow, which is capable of engulfing the matter it encounters. This physicality is maintained using an inverted AT Field, within which extends a number-imaginary space, a vacuum and a parallel dimension known as the "Dirac Sea". During the fight, this dark shadow extends to the feet of Eva-01 and begins to engulf it. It is not made clear whether Leliel's goal is the absorption of the humanoid or direct contact with its pilot, Shinji Ikari. Dr. Ritsuko Akagi devises a strategy to destroy Leliel and recover Unit 01 using all existing N^{2} bombs. During the countdown to ordnance release, the spherical body breaks and Unit 01 emerges, causing an anomaly in the imaginary number circuit and shooting down the enemy.

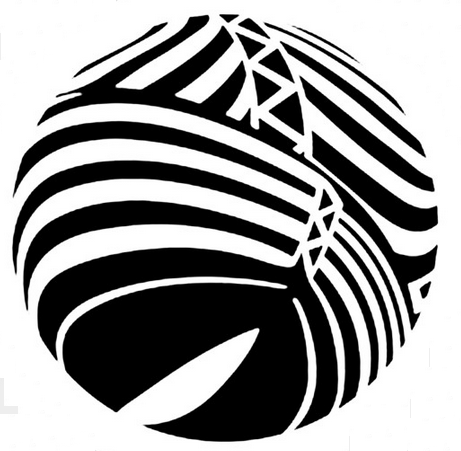
A recreation of the geometric patterns of Leliel

To explain the Angel's nature and its Dirac sea, Ritsuko said its body is made up of strings. Leliel is the angel of the night and is called the "prince of conception". The fictional Angel's shadow and the outflow of Unit 01, which resembles childbirth and gives it the characteristics of a womb, allude to the biblical angel. Geometric figures similar to female genitalia are also visible in its pattern. Its name means "jaw of God", which Will Raus interpreted as a reference to the fictional Angel's ability to consume any object. Its design is inspired by Surrealism and optical art. Japanese architect Yasutaka Yoshimura compared Leliel's design with Bridget Riley's work Fragment 5. Writer Virginie Nebbia compared it with Dada from Ultraman, while academic Dennis Redmond noted that Neuromancer makes use of moiré patterns in a scene in which Case tries to break free from a neural trap set by one of the AIs of the story.

While trapped inside the Angel, Shinji encounters and converses with another self. The scene, which is set on a train, was the idea of Kazuya Tsurumaki, who took inspiration from a dream he had as a child. The staff decided to include an episode with an Angel that is interested in humans to avoid revealing the riddles about the Angels' true nature. For the clash, Gainax condensed the ideas of what would have been a trilogy of episodes with the same theme. In the initial scenario, Leliel would select Japanese from the verses of some animals and several human languages so it could communicate with Shinji. Tsurumaki and the production staff changed their minds, finding the idea of an Angel conversing in human language "too anti-climactic" and "pulp fiction". According to the official film books of the series, the two Shinji in the sequence represent the psychological concepts of ego and superego. The Dirac Sea depicted in the anime took inspiration from Paul Dirac's concept of the same name and is also drawn from the novel Ten Billion Days and One Hundred Billion Nights (億の昼と千億の夜, Oku no hiru to sen oku no yoru) by Ryu Mitsuse. Anime Feminist writer Vrai Dee also compared Leliel to a black hole. The episode's original draft did not include the imaginary-number space or the parallel universe inside Leliel, whose design originally featured a face rather than a floating sphere.

=== Bardiel ===
Bardiel (バルディエル, Barudieru) has a nature similar to that of a fungus or a parasitic bacterium, which allows it to infiltrate the body of Eva-03 during its transport by air from the United States of America to Japan. After the contamination, a crack opens on the unit's back, inside which molten filaments similar to hyphae are visible. During its advance towards Tokyo-3, Bardiel fights against Eva-02 and Eva-00, making a white, irritant liquid drip inside the unit's body. Bardiel's attack mode does not belong to a single being, but to a colony of microscopic Angels. The Angel is defeated by Shinji Ikari's Eva-01, which is activated by a new piloting system named the Dummy System, which destroys the infected Evangelion.

The fictional Angel's contamination of Unit 03 during its passage through a blanket of storm clouds is an allusion to its namesake Bardiel, the angel of hail and lightning. Writer Dennis Redmond interpreted the scream of the infected Eva-03 as a reference to Godzilla. Redmond also noted that Bardiel is framed against a setting sun reminiscent of the Japanese flag in the episode. According to him, this is "a dead ringer for John Woo's Hong Kong thrillers, and the conclusion will subtly quote Woo's trademark theme of warring brothers or battling doubles". Most of the scenes where Bardiel appears were produced by Production I.G, who also contributed to the animation of the fight against Ireul. Writer Virginie Nebbia compared Bardiel's role to Imit Ultraman from the Ultraman series, fake Ultramans controlled by Alien Zarab. During the battle against Bardiel-infected Eva-03, tentacles were also meant to emerge and infect Eva-00. In Rebuild of Evangelion, Bardiel is known as the ninth Angel.

=== Zeruel ===
Zeruel (ゼルエル, Zerueru), the fourteenth Angel, is almost anthropomorphic. On its back are signs of a pair of wings, which in classical and popular iconography are the symbol of angelic creatures. In combat, Zeruel shows great physical strength, easily surpassing the line defences of Nerv and destroying 18 armor plates of the Nerv headquarters by a single attack. It is also able to evade detection by radar equipment, allowing it to penetrate the headquarters of the organization unimpeded. It emits explosive beams of light from its eyes, and can use its thin upper limbs by means of a blade-and-bellows-like mechanism. Although the Angel's core is exposed in the center of the chest, it has a protective armor to hide it in case of danger. This ability suggests the enemy is aware of the N^{2} device and that there is some kind of communication system between the Angel specimens. After Zeruel defeats Eva-00 and Eva-02, it is finally defeated by Eva-01, which enters the berserk state to devour it, ingesting its S^{2} engine.

Zeruel's first attack technique is similar to that of the Ultraman series's Jet Beetle. Writer Virginie Nebbia also compared Zeruel to another Ultraman monster, Zetton. Zeruel is the angel of power, a reference to its physical strength. Its name can be translated as "arm of God", to which its second offensive technique alludes. According to Will Raus, its limbs are as thin as a sheet of paper and suggest a pun on the Japanese words for "paper" (紙, kami) and "god" (神, kami). The manga artist Yoshitō Asari collaborated in the conception of its basic structure. According to Asari, "When I was asked to collaborate, I was told that the Angel's body should appear slow and clumsy, but that it was so strong that it could make fun of [the Evangelion]". Sachiel and Zeruel's design took inspiration from a shinigami, a Japanese god of death.

In Rebuild of Evangelion, Zeruel is known as the tenth Angel. Asari again designed the creature; except for the skull, which is almost identical to the one in the classic series, the movie's Zeruel has paper-like tentacles it wraps around its body like the bands of a mummy. During the fight, it devours Unit 00 with Rei Ayanami, assuming the appearance of an anthropomorphic female figure. For the likeness of the new Zeruel, the animators took inspiration from the monster King Joe from Ultraseven and an Angel in the original draft of the series, a cube-shaped "origami Apostolo" inspired by the Möbius strip. Its anthropomorphic female form is inspired by Riderman from Kamen Rider. Writer Virginie Nebbia also noted that Zeruel's battle closely resembles the final battle in Revolutionary Girl Utena.

=== Arael ===
Arael (アラエル, Araeru) is the fifteenth Angel. It appears and remains in geostationary orbit for the entire duration of its observation. At first, it is motionless at a constant distance from Earth, deploying giant luminescent wings. Asuka Langley Soryu with her Eva-02 positions herself at the center of Tokyo-3 to intercept it, but the Angel begins to erode her mind using a wave that radars cannot detect. The Angel makes Asuka relive her childhood trauma in an attempt to investigate her mental wavelength by learning her mechanisms and rendering the human on board the Evangelion harmless. According to Ritsuko, Arael's attack is an attempt to investigate the human heart and contact the unit's pilot. The energetic light beam is visible to humans, a phenomenon attributed to the presence of an unknown energy, something similar to an AT Field. Units 00 attacks Arael with its firearm, but its attempts are thwarted by its strong AT Field. Arael is ultimately defeated by Eva-00 after it launches into orbit a weapon called Longinus' spear, quickly reaching Arael and piercing through its AT Field.

Virginie Nebbia compared Arael's design with Perolynga from Ultraseven, and its exploration of Asuka's mind with Solaris from the novel of the same name. Arael is the angel of birds; its bird-like appearance in the show is a reference to this. Its name means "light" or "vision of God", which Will Raus interpreted as referenced by its beam of light. Arael was planned to appear in the nineteenth episode; it would appear in the Earth's atmosphere and would use its twelve semi-transparent wings as a high-frequency cutting weapon. The Evangelion units would face it in an aerial confrontation, in which Shinji would attempt to save Asuka. The sequences of the psychological battle between the Angel and Asuka have been compared to Gestalt psychology, in particular by the field theory of the German psychologist Kurt Lewin, according to which each individual is part of a context in which each one creates a personal reality.

=== Armisael ===
Armisael (アルミサエル, Arumisaeru) has a luminescent body and an ill-defined circular shape that later stabilizes above the valley of Ōwaku, rotating around its axis. Once its rotation stops, the Angel metamorphosizes into a string, It launches an attack against Unit 00, piercing its body at the level of the womb. Armisael seeks physical and mental contact with the target, violating the components of the unit, which is led by pilot Rei Ayanami. It is speculated Armisael continues Arael's psychic incursion, launching into a communicative attack on Rei. Under attack, Rei loses her senses and inside her mind she meets another self that is Armisael, which sweetly speaks to her using the words from her own unconscious mind. The Angel asks Rei to unite with it to alleviate the pain caused by the attack. After awakening, Rei activates a process of self-destruction of her unit. Rei causes a violent explosion that engulfs and annihilates the Angel, and much of Tokyo-3.

The episode's original script explicitly instructed the staff to stage the battle against Armisael "with the image of rape in mind" (強姦のイメージで, gōkan no imēji de). Shortly before the explosion and the Angel's defeat, Eva-00 assumes the silhouette of Rei Ayanami, with Armisael arranged on her head like a halo, an iconographic Christian attribute of angels and saints. Armisael, confirming the hypotheses of intercommunication between the Angels and the Angel being aware of their predecessors' experiences, is aware of the human psyche. In religious texts, Armisael is the angel of the womb; in Jewish tradition, a woman could relieve the pain of childbirth by invoking his name. During the battle on 00's back, a heteromorphic organism with contours that recall the forms of the previous Angels develops. Armisael thus contains the genetic information of the other Angels. Its shape is similar to a double helix ring and has been compared with the DNA or a mathematical surface that cannot be oriented, such as the Möbius strip and the Klein's bottle. Writer Álvaro Arbonés further noted that, during the battle, Eva-00 assumes an appearance reminiscent of a caricature of a pregnant woman.

=== Tabris ===
Tabris (タブリス, Taburisu) goes by the name of Kaworu Nagisa, and becomes the replacement pilot of Eva-02 after Asuka's mental breakdown. After arriving in Tokyo-3, Tabris becomes a friend of Shinji Ikari, but betrays him and takes possession of Eva-02 in an attempt to break into the Terminal Dogma, where it believes Adam is kept. Upon discovering the giant guarded in Nerv is Lilith, Tabris decides to stop its attack and entrusts its fate to Shinji's Unit 01, allowing itself to be killed. Writer Virginie Nebbia compared Kaworu's role to Perolynga and Metron from Ultraseven. According to the Nuctemeron of Apollonius of Tyana, Tabris is a demon and the angel of free will. This is reflected in Evangelion's Tabris's decision to die at the hands of Shinji. Nuctemeron also mentions a demon called Cahor, pronounced Kahoru (カホル) in Japanese, which is referred to as the angel of deception, a detail the Evangelion Chronicle encyclopedia relates to Tabris' deceptive, anthropomorphic appearance.

Like Arael and Armisael, who both attempt to make contact with Asuka's and Rei's souls, Kaworu aggressively tries to touch Shinji's thoughts, but through peaceful human exchange rather than an open attack. Tabris claims that the Angels' AT Fields are the light of the soul and "the walls of the heart," possessed by everyone, so it neutralizes Shinji's AT Field by eliminating the emotional barriers around his metaphorical heart. Yūichirō Oguro, editor of supplementary materials for the Japanese home video editions of the series, hypothesized that the Angels could rapidly alter their forms and abilities to suit their environments or objectives, possibly through an accelerated form of evolution. He interpreted the preceding Angels as having explored different forms before Kaworu, the final Angel, attained the same form as humans. Oguro also linked Kaworu to the preceding Angels' interest in the human mind, suggesting that he may represent the completed form resulting from their accumulation of information about human psychology. Scholar Gavin McDowell further argued that Kaworu's revelation that he carries Adam's soul echoes Paul the Apostle's theology, which presents Christ as the new Adam.

=== Lilin ===
Lilim (リリム, Ririmu), or Lilin (リリン, Ririn), is the name used by Kaworu Nagisa to refer to human beings. In the movie The End of Evangelion, it is revealed that humans are the eighteenth and final Angel, and direct descendants of Lilith. According to rabbinic scriptures, the Lilim, known as Lilin, are the children of Adam and his first wife, Lilith.

== In Rebuild of Evangelion ==
New Angels are introduced in the Rebuild of Evangelion film tetralogy, while reappearing Angels from the original series have an altered numbering. In the films, the Angels were made with three-dimensional and CG models, with the exception of the ninth and tenth Angels, which are based on Bardiel and Zeruel. A rainbow appears when the Angels are killed; according to Comic Book Resources' Danny Hernandez, the symbol may refer to Genesis, according to which God placed a rainbow in the sky by God as a testimony of His covenant with Noah. Rainbows also feature in the series; Mitsuo Iso added them, as they were believed in ancient times to be a bridge to Heaven and a symbol of the pact between humanity and God. Writer Virginie Nebbia noted that a rainbow appears after Gorbago's death in Return of Ultraman and in Tokyo: The Last Megalopolis (1988). In Rebuild of Evangelion, the Angels do not have names; according to Masayuki, their names were excluded in the scripting phase because they were never used by the staff, who barely remembered them.

The new Angels that appear in the films are:

- The third Angel (第3の使徒, Dai-3 Shito). Part of its body, which is composed of bones, is similar to a snake skeleton. The third Angel is equipped with four small limbs for walking, an Evangelion cockpit, a tail and a long neck similar to wings which it uses to fly. It is unearthed from permafrost in the Palearctic, and is sealed by the European branch of Nerv to be researched and dissected. To kill its enemies, the third Angel uses light beams, which it uses to fight against Eva-05. The fight takes place in Bethany base, where it is defeated. Its basic design was conceived by Hideaki Anno, who during production thought of giving it the ability to spit acid, taking inspiration from the monster Stegon (ステゴン) from Ultraman. Anno asked Mohiro Kitoh to redefine its appearance, suggesting something in the style of Narutaru. Writer Virginie Nebbia interpreted it as a possible homage to Ultraman Seabozu. Writer Álvaro Arbonés also connected Mari's first battle, in which she faces the skeletal third Angel with her spear-wielding Eva-05, to the traditional iconography of the medieval knight defeating the dragon.
- The seventh Angel (第7の使徒, Dai-7 Shito). It was designed by second unit director Daizen Komatsuda to resemble a grandfather clock-like drinking bird; its head is identical to Sachiel's mask and is capable of rotating like the hands of a clock. It has a fake oscillating core that it uses as a decoy and an authentic core that is hidden inside its body. It reprises the role of Gaghiel, which appears in the eighth episode of the classic series. The seventh Angel was included in the movie due to technical necessity; the genga or key frames of the eighth episode were lost and the production staff rethought the entire scenario of Asuka's arrival. The creature's face is the work of animator Shigeto Koyama, while the body, which was designed by Anno, is inspired by the Toshiba IHI building at the 1970 Osaka Expo. The angel moves by freezing the sea's surface and uses water to kill its enemies; it is defeated by Asuka's Eva-02.
- The twelfth Angel (第12の使徒, Dai-12 Shito). Introduced in the film Evangelion: 3.0 You Can (Not) Redo (2012), it takes the form of a set of black filaments that emerge from Mark.06 and is eventually killed as it gets eaten by Evangelion 13.

== In other media ==
Angels appear in works based on Neon Genesis Evangelion with different appearances and roles. In the comic book adaptation of the series, which was drawn by character designer Yoshiyuki Sadamoto, Sandalphon, Matarael, Ireul and Leliel do not appear and the number of Angels is reduced to twelve. More differences are introduced in the manga Neon Genesis Evangelion: Campus Apocalypse, in which they are depicted as creatures that take possession of dead bodies to obtain gems called "cores".

In the video game Shin seiki Evangelion: 2nd Impression, an Angel called Original Angel (オリジナル使徒, Orijinaru Shito) is introduced. The Angel presents itself in different forms. In the first form, the Angel's body is formed by disc-shaped plates, from which sprout small, scissor-like spines, and on the bottom some limbs similar to those of an insect. After a metamorphosis, it transforms into a pupa and then evolves into its final flying-insect-like form. In its third form, the Angel splits its AT Field and absorbs the energy of the Evangelion units. Original Angel's core is hidden inside a girl named Mayumi Yamagishi. Mahiro Maeda worked on the Original Angel design.

In the board game Neon Genesis Evangelion RPG (新世紀エヴァンゲリオンRPG, Shinseiki Evangerion RPG), which was published by Kadokawa Shoten, Angels Sachiel, Shamshel, Ramiel, Gaghiel, Israfel, Materael and Sahaquiel, and two new Angels appear. The first, Iblis (イブリース, Iburīsu), has the appearance of a purple-colored mollusk. On the top of the shell is a graphic motif in the shape of a human eye. The second, called Barakijal (バラキエル, Barakieru), is orange and spherical. Additional Angels appear in a board game called Shinseiki Evangelion RPG Kessen! Daisan Shin Tōkyō Shi (新世紀エヴァンゲリオンRPG 決戦！第3新東京市, "Neon Genesis Evangelion RPG Decisive Battle in Tokyo-3"): Adovaquiel (アドヴァキエル, Adovuakieru), similar to an aquatic spore that shoots energy projectiles; Zefon (ゼフォン) is a humanoid Angel equipped with an energy cannon; Atalibu (アタリブ, Ataribu) is dinosaur-like and attacks with its claws; and Azrael (アズラエル, Azuraeru) is shaped like a virus and able to attack by manipulating gravity.

The Angels have also been used in video games based on the television series and other games detached from the Evangelion franchise, as in MapleStory, Million Arthur, Monster Hunter Explore and in the video games Princess Punt Sweets (ケリ姫スイーツ, Keri hime suītsu) and Summons Board by GunHo Online Entertainment. In the Divine Gate video game by the same production company, Angels from Rebuild of Evangelion are depicted in anthropomorphic robes and have different names. An enemy similar to Neon Genesis Evangelion's Angels appears in a crossover episode of the anime Shinkansen Henkei Robo Shinkalion, whose design combines those of several Rebuild Angels.

== Cultural references and interpretations ==
Writer Patrick Drazen analyzed the series' cosmology, comparing it with the Shinto cosmology presented in the texts of the Kojiki and Nihon shoki. According to Drazen, the cosmogony proposed by Anno, despite the Judeo-Christian references, presents a strong Japanese background. He compared the First Impact, and the presence of the White Moon of the Angels and the Black Moon of humanity, to the Japanese myth on the origin of the world, according to which the cosmos was born from a primordial, chaotic, egg-like soup from which light and darkness were separated. The Spear of Longinus has also been compared with Ame-no-Nuboko (天沼矛), the spear of the two creator kamis Izanagi and Izanami; according to the myth, the two creator deities formed the first island of the Japanese archipelago with the spear. Drazen, noting the Black Moon is placed on the Izu Peninsula, interpreted the mythopoiesis of the series as a cosmogony according to which all human life on Earth springs from Japan, as a hi-tech version of Kojiki.

According to writers Jonathan Clements and Helen McCarthy, the use of Western religious symbols, such as cruciform explosions generated by Angels, leads one to think of Western beliefs as an alien invasion within Evangelion, but in their view the symbols are rooted in Anno's insights into archetypes and Jungian psychology. Writers have interpreted Evangelion as a recreation of the Pacific War from the Japanese point of view, especially regarding the final apocalyptic events. Susan J. Napier, an American critic and writer, linked the monstrous creatures in Neon Genesis Evangelion and other anime to the atomic bomb trauma suffered by the Japanese people after the bombings of Hiroshima and Nagasaki. Writer Virginie Nebbia similarly compared the Second Impact to the World War II and its consequences on Japan.

According to researcher Marcello Ghilardi and other anime critics, the Angels reflect the feelings of a part of Japanese youth of the 1990s, a time when Japanese society was in the midst of an economic crisis and when "the ability to react and trust in the future seemed to have vanished", while the impossibility of clearly identifying the origin of the difficulties paralyzed society and made it made "prey to a sense of expectation and precariousness". Their identification code, "Blood Type – Blue", is an homage to the alternative title of the sci-fi film Blue Christmas (1978) by Kihachi Okamoto, an influential author for Anno. Scholar Gavin McDowell compared the conflict between the Angels and humanity, who possess the fruit of life and the fruit of knowledge respectively, to the biblical narrative of the Book of Genesis, and noted that many of Evangelion's Angel names appear in the Book of Enoch, a text found among the Dead Sea Scrolls. McDowell further suggested that Anno may have drawn inspiration from Gustav Davidson's A Dictionary of Angels during the series' production. Neon Genesis Evangelion manga editor Carl Gustav Horn also noted that in some doctrines of the Jewish Kabbalah angels are not conceived as alien entities, but as beings that were present and recently awakened in the Creation.

Critics compared the Angels to the kaijū, monsters typical of Japanese science fiction. Anime Academy reviewers linked Evangelion to earlier monster-of-the-week products, such as Sailor Moon and Power Rangers, tracing influences to Macross and the works of Gō Nagai. Art magazine Real Time also analyzed the Angels, saying their design reflects ancient and modern archetypes, comparing them to Aztec paintings, Joan Miró murals and Donald Judd cubes. According to writer Álvaro Arbonés, the Angels' destruction of Tokyo-3 places Neon Genesis Evangelion alongside works such as Coin Locker Babies, Popular Hits of the Showa Era: A Novel and Tetsuo: The Iron Man, all of which depict the destruction of Tokyo and belong to a current of Japanese culture that "cannot imagine anything but the end of the world". Virginie Nebbia linked the Angels' origin as Adam's true descendants from the White Moon to Ultraseven, whose story features the Nonmalt, a population portrayed as Earth's original inhabitants who regard human beings as usurpers.

IGN's Ramsey Isler interpreted the battles against the Angels as a metaphor for Anno's attempts to defeat his internal demons and depression. Scholar Mariana Ortega, noting the mythological Lilith represents "the Other Side", a dark world in which deep libidinal and unconscious desires are not controlled, interpreted Neon Genesis Evangelion as a possible tale of psychic struggles between ego and unconscious, Jungian shadow and anima/animus. According to Ortega, the purpose of the Nerv, the Seele and the Angels is "a kind of return to an original womb". Other scholars have described the Angels as representations of the Other that Shinji must face to form his identity, while Japanese writer Kotani Mari interpreted them as a representation of the concept of abjection, which was formulated by philosopher Julia Kristeva. Susan Napier, noting the Angels are explicitly associated with Gendo throughout the series, described them as father figures. Hideaki Anno himself compared Gendo and the first Angel Adam to father figures, saying he took inspiration from the Oedipal complex postulated by Sigmund Freud.

== Cultural impact ==
=== Popularity and critical reception ===
The Angels' designs and fighting styles received positive reviews from critics and audiences. In 2017 the news magazine Livedoor News opened a survey asking the fans to choose their favorite Angel; in the poll, Adam and Ramiel ranked first and second, respectively. The magazine, talking about the reasons for Ramiel's popularity, discussed the beauty of its geometric features and felt sorry for Arael's low position of the eleventh place. Anime News Network's Nick Creamer praised the first confrontation against Sachiel, calling its disc face "iconic". Creamer also lauded the battles against the Angels, describing them as "a captivating combination of eerily distinct monster designs, creative tactical setups, and gorgeous, horrifying fight animation".

The synchronized battle against Israfel received positive reviews from critics. Comic Book Resources described the fight as one of the best action scenes in the entire series. The fights against Bardiel and Zeruel also drew positive opinions. The US magazine Anime Invasion ranked the Zeruel battle as the eighth-best fight in Japanese animation history. Martin Theron of Anime News Network and Nicole MacLean of THEM Anime Reviews also made positive comments about their design, describing them as "jaw-dropping" and "nothing short of astounding". Anime News Network's Justin Sevakis appreciated the omission of their names in the first two installments of the Rebuild of Evangelion film tetralogy, lacking the Judeo-Christian references from the original series, which he described as "confusing and problematic".

=== Merchandise and legacy ===
Images of the Angels have been used to produce merchandising items, such as action figures, T-shirts, paperweights, bags, underwear, collectible models and foodstuffs. In 2005, to celebrate the tenth anniversary of the first airing of the series, manga artist Mine Yoshizaki designed several action figures of the Angels in anthropomorphic likenesses for a line titled Angel XX; among the various models, he designed Lilith and Sachiel puppets inspired by Rei Ayanami's character design. The website Evastore, the official distributor of articles and merchandise inspired by Neon Genesis Evangelion, adopted as its mascot an Angel named Yuru-Shito, which was later used for products and an official role-playing game of the series.

According to Guido Tavassi, a scholar and critic of Japanese animation, the "revolutionary" appearance of the Angels is among the stylistic innovations introduced by the anime, "[which] proposes a complete abstraction of the shapes of the enemies ... with a choice that will have an enormous impact on the design of the series of the [mecha] genre that followed". Matarael's design inspired Nobuhiro Watsuki to create the eye costume of Usui Uonuma, one of the characters in the manga Rurouni Kenshin. Leliel inspired Yūichirō Oguro to create the enemies of Gekiganger 3, the aliens of the Kyo'akk Empire who come from a dimension called "Dark String Universe". Staff of Avatar: The Last Airbender also took inspiration from the Angels of Evangelion for the design of the panda Hei Bei.

Jonathan Clements and Helen McCarthy have traced a possible Evangelion influence on the Dolems, RahXephon's main antagonists. For Sci Fi Weekly's Tasha Robinson, Aquarion's Shadow Angels can also be influenced by Evangelion's Angels. IGN's Jemima Sebastian compared a scene in Godzilla vs. Kong, in which King Kong on a ship suffers an underwater attack from Godzilla, to the fight between Gaghiel and Eva-02 from the eighth episode of the series. The same author also noted how an evolution of Algomon presented in the Digimon anime is reminiscent of the designs of certain Angels from Neon Genesis Evangelion. Sachiel's design inspired Jordan Vogt-Roberts for Kong: Skull Island's Skullcrawler. Polygon compared the unfurled design of the flying cryptid movie monster Jean Jacket in Jordan Peele's Nope with Sahaquiel. Furthermore, according to Yahoo! website Shamshel design almost certainly inspired Jean Jacket's final form. On July 25, 2022, Slashfilm confirmed via Peele's production notes for Nope that Jean Jacket had been specifically inspired by the Angels of Neon Genesis Evangelion; Peele himself stated that he was particularly influenced by their "hyper minimalism" and "biomechanical design flair". The creators of the video game Genshin Impact also drew inspiration from Ramiel's design for the conception of some life forms called Hypostasis.

== See also ==
- List of Neon Genesis Evangelion characters
- Evangelion (mecha)
- Mahiro Maeda
