= El Shaddai: Ascension of the Metatron =

2011 video game

- North American cover art
- Developer: Ignition Tokyo (Note: Windows port developed by Crim. Nintendo Switch port co-developed by Crim and Aqualead.)
- Publisher: UTV Ignition Games (Note: Windows port and Nintendo Switch digital version published by Crim. Nintendo Switch physical release published by Rainy Frog.)
- Director: Sawaki Takeyasu
- Producers: Kashow Oda; Masato Kimura
- Designer: Yusuke Nakagawa
- Programmer: Katsuya Nakamura
- Artists: Soutarou Hori; Sawaki Takeyasu
- Writer: Yasushi Ohtake
- Composers: Masato Kouda; Kento Hasegawa
- Engine: Gamebryo; Aqualead Framework (2024 release)
- Platforms: PlayStation 3; Xbox 360; Windows; Nintendo Switch; PlayStation 5
- Release: PlayStation 3, Xbox 360: JP: April 28, 2011; NA: August 16, 2011; EU: September 8, 2011; AU: September 15, 2011; Windows: WW: September 2, 2021; Switch: WW: April 28, 2024; PlayStation 5: WW: TBA
- Genre: Action
- Mode: Single-player

El Shaddai: Ascension of the Metatron (Note: Japanese: エルシャダイ アセンション・オブ・ザ・メタトロン, Hepburn: Eru Shadai Asenshon obu za Metatoron) is a 2011 action video game developed by Ignition Tokyo and published by UTV Ignition Games for PlayStation 3 and Xbox 360. It saw later releases on Windows and Nintendo Switch, with a PlayStation 5 port planned for later release. The storyline, based on the apocryphal Book of Enoch, follows the immortal scribe Enoch as he is sent by God to find seven fallen angels and save humanity from a great flood triggered by the Council of Heaven. Gameplay has Enoch platforming through 2D and 3D levels which vary in presentation and art style, with hack and slash combat using weapons stolen from enemies.

Production began in 2007, and included several former members of Capcom's Clover Studio. After being contacted about the project idea, director and character designer Sawaki Takeyasu was given extensive creative freedom, contributing to the simplified game design and focus on art and music. The storyline, based around the theme of self-sacrifice, was described by Takeyasu as being "half-finished" due to production problems. The music was co-composed by Masato Kouda and Kento Hasegawa, with members of music production company Imagine contributing to arrangements.

Announced in May 2010, El Shaddai received an extensive promotional campaign. Journalists praised its art design and music, but the game saw low sales. The game was Ignition Tokyo's only product, as it was closed in 2011 shortly before its release, and planned sequels were abandoned. Takeyasu supervised further El Shaddai-related media, going on to purchase the intellectual property in 2013 and developing a follow-up called The Lost Child in 2017, and another called Starnaut in 2025.

== Gameplay ==
Protagonist Enoch in a boss battle with a hostile Nephilim

El Shaddai: Ascension of the Metatron is a single-player action video game in which players take control of the immortal scribe Enoch through eleven levels; the gameplay combines elements of platforming and hack and slash-based combat. Each of the levels uses a different artistic style and camera position, with levels alternating between 3D and 2D presentation. One level includes a driving sequence on a motorbike. During exploration and combat, Enoch can jump, attack, block long and short-ranged attacks, and dodge.

In combat, Enoch fights standard enemies and bosses in arenas, initially with his bare fists and then with three weapon types stolen from enemies. the weapons are the sword-like Arch, the long-range Gale, and the heavy-hitting Veil which also acts as a shield; each is strong or weak against another weapon. When in combat, Enoch's attacks are mapped to one button, with the frequency and timing of presses determining the type of attack; repeated presses launches a combination attack, while holding the button can trigger alternate strong attacks. Weapons must be periodically purified to recharge them as they lose attack power when used for a period of time. Enoch can also parry attacks or break an enemy's blocking stance with the right timing, allowing for counterattacks. During some later fights Enoch can trigger Overboost, which increases Enoch's attack power and unlocks unique skills.

Levels house secret areas and collectables alongside items which aid the player. These items are Lights of Blessing which restore Enoch's armor, Flames of Power which can be used to increase the Overboost level, and Fruits of Wisdom which give access to weapons. El Shaddai does not use a traditional HUD on its initial playthrough, with information being displayed through the in-game environment; damage to Enoch and enemies are shown through their armour, graphic displays show an enemy's status, the character Lucifel appears in the environment and saves the player's progress, and Enoch's weapons display their condition through color. In most scenarios when Enoch is knocked out, the player can revive by rapidly pressing face buttons, with the window of recovery lessening as the game progresses. If Enoch falls during a platforming section, he is reset to an earlier safe location to try again.

== Synopsis ==
Semyaza, a former member of the Council of Heaven, steals pieces of God's wisdom and descends to Earth due to his love of humans. Alongside Azazel, Ezekiel, Armaros, Sariel, Arakiel and Baraqel—referred to as the Grigori—they accelerate human evolution and produce human-Grigori hybrids called Nephilim which threaten to destroy the world. Enoch, originally brought to Heaven as a scribe, is sent to Earth by God to recover the Grigori before the Council of Heaven triggers a great flood to wipe out all life. After three centuries of searching, accompanied by the guardian angel Lucifel and four Archangels, Enoch discovers the Grigori's Tower in an isolated spacial realm. As he navigates the Tower and fights its enthralled inhabitants, he learns through notes left by allied human Freemen and statements from the Grigori that an entity of Darkness called Belial tempted the Grigori with power in exchange for the souls of humans who die in the Tower. Enoch ends up meeting a human Freeman girl called Nanna and her passive Nephilim companion Neph, then defeats Sariel and learns that Nephilim die when their parent Grigori is defeated. It is revealed that Baraqel was devoured by one of his Nephilim when it went berserk, and Arakiel died during the Grigori's descent.

During his fight with Armaros, Belial tricks Enoch into the Darkness by kidnapping Nanna. Armaros, who considered himself Enoch's friend before coming to Earth, sacrifices himself to the Darkness to retrieve Enoch and Nanna, the latter absorbing the spirit of legendary Freeman warrior Ishtar. While Enoch's soul recovers, the surviving Grigori massacre the Freemen, and a despairing Nanna embraces Ishtar's power and fights the Grigori as the Darkness begins corrupting her. A revived Enoch defeats Ezekiel, which kills her Nephilim children including Neph. On the top floor, Enoch defeats Azazel, who is then killed by Belial and replaced by the corrupted Armaros. Enoch defeats Armaros and purifies Nanna, the two discovering that Semyaza has already died. Lucifel then teleports Nanna away, and a final narration from the Archangels reveals Enoch's actions ended the Tower's influence and persuaded the Council of Elders to halt the flood. A post-credits scene shows Armaros's passive Nephilim swimming in the ocean, hinting that Armaros is still alive.

== Development ==
The concept for El Shaddai emerged at UTV Ignition Games, a video game developer and publisher. Then-CEO Vijay Chadha was a fan of Sawaki Takeyasu, an artist known for his work at Capcom on Devil May Cry (2001) and Ōkami (2005). Following Ōkami, Takeyasu went into freelance development through his studio Crim. In 2006, after hearing Takeyasu had gone independent, Chadha visited him in Japan and persuaded him to create a new action game with Takeyasu's art style. This coincided with UTV Ignition's UK offices pitching a new game intellectual property (IP) which would be based on the apocryphal Book of Enoch. After accepting the project, Takeyasu was given great creative freedom. The game successfully pitched to UTV Ignition's Indian office, which provided funding, using a movie Takeyasu put together with help from CGI production company Shirogumi.

Development was handled by Ignition Tokyo, a studio founded in late 2007 as part of UTV Ignition's in-house development plan; El Shaddai was the only project completed by the studio before it was closed down in March 2011 due to restructuring within UTV Ignition following poor financial performances. Initially Takeyasu was only handling character and world design, but his in-depth position caused him to be appointed director. Masato Kimura and UTV Ignition's Kashow Oda were co-producers. Several staff members were veterans of the then-defunct Clover Studio, with further additions from Square Enix and Sony Computer Entertainment. The lead designer was Yusuke Nakagawa. Katsuya Nakamura acted as lead programmer. A large number of the team members were first-time developers, prompting an early focus on studio structure to ensure easy development.

Full production began in 2007 and lasted three years; initially only having four staff members including Takeyasu and Kimura, the team expanded to 100 people internally, and a total of between 120 and 130 including freelance developers. The game was completed and going through final quality assurance and submission by December 2010. Full production wrapped in March 2011. Takeyasu later stated the budget was around ¥2 billion. The game was made for both PlayStation 3 (PS3) and Xbox 360 (360), with Takeyasu not wanting the game to release until the consoles were well established in the market. Development was smooth until Ignition's later financial troubles forced the team to finish the game ahead of schedule, releasing it without having additional time for balancing and bug fixes. The choice to release it was Takeyasu's, was the game would otherwise have been cancelled.

Takeyasu wanted the game to be a balance between the traditional design of Devil May Cry and the artistic focus of Ōkami. The goal was a mythology-based action game similar to the God of War series. While this concept was established early, the gameplay design was not fully settled upon until late into development. The design aim was to create a game where story, art and music was the central element. As games at the time were moving towards more realistic graphics and complex control schemes, Takeyasu took the opposite approach for El Shaddai. The game alternated between 3D and 2D levels to add variety. Takeyaso, after noting companies other than Nintendo were not producing platformers, incorporated extensive platforming into El Shaddai. Speaking about the simplified controls, Takeyasu compared their functionality to both rhythm and fighting games due to the emphasis on timing. There was also no traditional UI or HUD, with it instead being integrated into the world to promote player immersion. The jumping was given depth through the role of weapons, but this freedom increased the bug testing load. The weapon mechanics were implemented by Takeyasu after receiving complaints from other staff members that they could not design the gameplay around the simplified controls. The need to release early meant the team could not add more level-based gimmicks such as building stairways and breaking a sequence of walls to progress. The bike level was created with assistance from developers of the Shutoko Battle series.

To allow for maximum trial and error within development time, it was decided to license different middleware. Five different middlewares were used to take pressure off of the studio staff, a rarity in Japanese development at the time. After testing different game engines, the team settled on Gamebryo as they felt it would work with their design needs. While Unreal Engine was considered, there was little support for it in Japan and thus a lack of information on its use. It also lacked features which could implement the desired art style. The animation was handled by the Morpheme middleware program, with added functions created with help from its developer NaturalMotion. Using Morpheme, the team created character animations that would be stylised and flow naturally into each other without losing all realism. Additionally the team used Autodesk's Scaleform GFx for the menu and text displays, Nvidia's PhysX for the in-game physics, and CRI Middleware's CRI Movie software for video playback. To achieve the levels' real-time visual changes, multiple custom shaders were used which shifted the game's art and lighting based on camera and player position. The shaders were created by programmer Tsuyoshi Okugawa based on Hori's designs. Okugawa called the debugging "dirty and difficult" due to the interacting shaders.

=== Scenario and art design ===
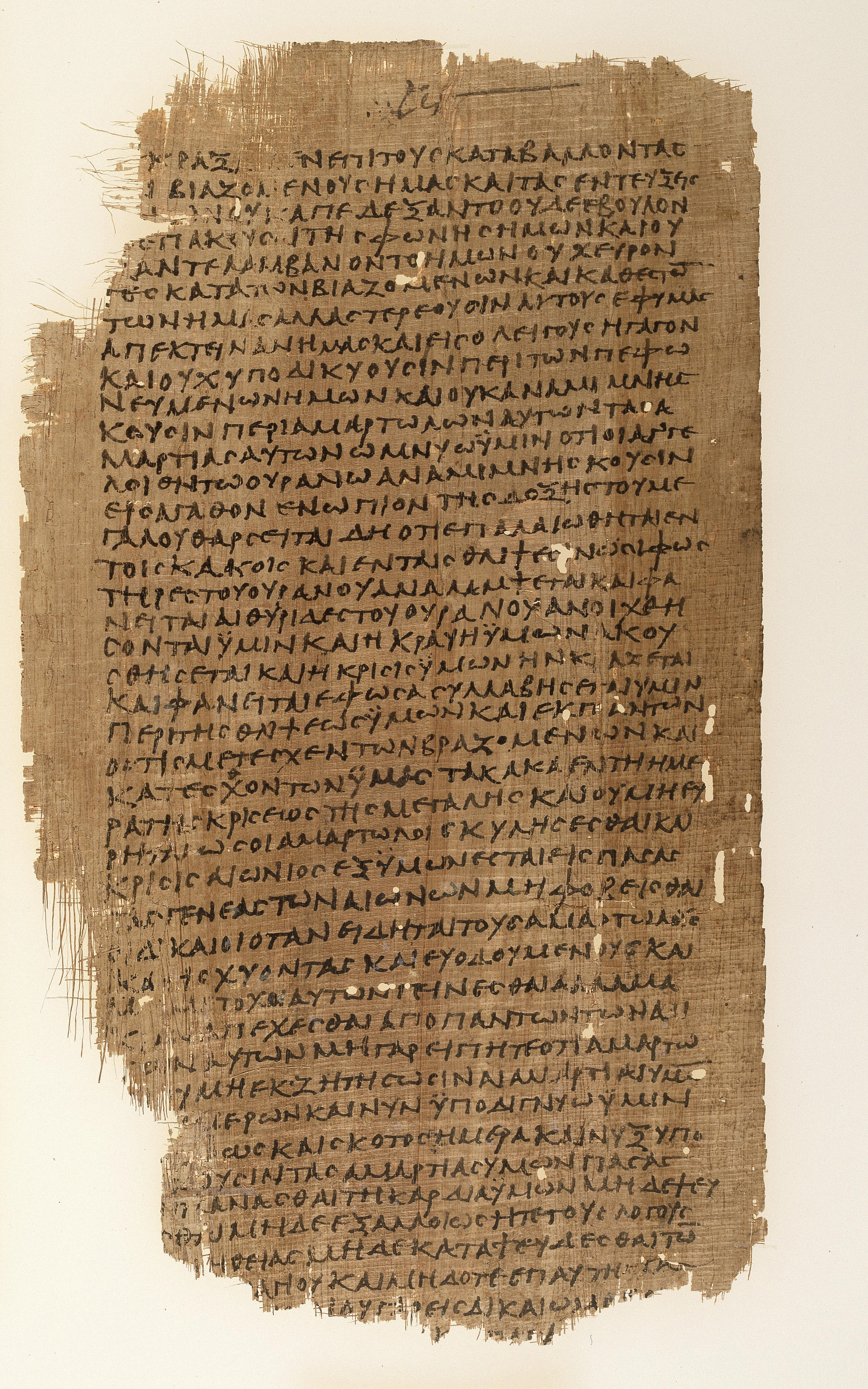
El Shaddai drew its narrative and characters from the apocryphal Book of Enoch (4th century manuscript pictured).

The storyline drew direct inspiration from the "Book of Watchers", described as a "key part" of the Book of Enoch. As part of his research, Takeyasu read both the Book of Enoch, and writings based around Enoch and Lucifel, finding the latter to be "boring" in their approach. He also found the Book of Enoch difficult to read in some places, so instead of adapting it directly, the team used it as a base for a fantastical story, which Takeyasu was not concerned about given the story's age. During its prototyping phase in 2007, the game was titled Angelic. While Takeyasu liked the title, a trademark search revealed a similarly-titled series owned by Koei Tecmo. The final title "El Shaddai", which is commonly translated as "God Almighty", was suggested by UK Ignition staff as a reference to the religious subject matter. The subtitle, also proposed by Ignition staff, had no definite meaning.

Takeyasu created the overall story, while the script was written by Yasushi Ohtake. Takeyasu described the theme as self-sacrifice, which is portrayed as a quality inherent to humans. When creating the story, Takeyasu planned out a larger nine chapter narrative of which El Shaddai was the fourth chapter, with other events being hinted at or partially shown in-game. Takeyasu further planned a second and third game based on the established game engine and scenario. The narrative was ultimately left "half-finished" due to the studio's closure. To create a suitable connection to the player, Enoch was made a silent protagonist. Lucifel was intended as an enigmatic character who would still be sympathetic, with his ability to manipulate time allowing for a saving and loading mechanic without obvious in-game displays. Takeyasu later stated some of his own personality ended up being incorporated into Lucifel. The two leads were presented as appearing in their late 20s to early 30s, consciously avoiding the Japanese stereotype of the adolescent hero character. An early scrapped idea was for El Shaddai to have a female protagonist.

When deciding on the visual theme, Takeyasu based it around Lucifel's ability to travel to any era, allowing anachronistic elements to appear in both the characters and visuals. Initially aiming for a medieval theme, the final setting ended up as "a sense of statelessness and a sense of timelessness", blending in fantasy and science fiction elements. This approach was partially inspired by the story of the Tower of Babel. He also wanted a visual design that would always be changing. Each of the zones drew inspiration from the Grigori's obsessions. Takeyasu asked the game's art director Soutarou Hori to create a "unique" art style for the environments. Starting from a base of traditional religious imagery, Hori created a piece of art combining that with a style of simple contrasting colors inspired by iPad advertisements. The final style grew from this, removing game-focused information to focus on the art, which used contrasting and frequent changes of art style. According to Takeyasu, around 70% of the visuals remained unchanged during development. Shirogumi animated both CGI and real-time cutscenes.

Takeyasu created the designs for Enoch, Lucifel and the Nephilim at around the same time, basing them on the visual theme of a timeless realm. Enoch's design took the longest to finalise, with his armor taking inspiration from tokusatsu and mecha armour designs. He started from a concept of what Ōkami protagonist Amaterasu would look like as a human. His design was inspired by Enoch's presentation as a simple and honest man in the original text, with his armour meant to be otherworldly without being flashy. The armor was also a reference to Enoch's eventual form as the angel Metatron. Takeyasu included a pair of jeans in the design as he liked jeans.

Lucifel was the first character Takeyasu designed, and stayed generally unchanged during development. His human appearance, which Takeyasu feared would have him mistaken for a villain, informed the non-human designs of the Grigori. Enoch and Lucifel were designed to contrast each other in appearance, representing the stylistic extremes of the West (Enoch) and Japan (Lucifel). Takeyasu also avoided sexualized design stereotypes for the female characters. The Nephilim's unconventional design was directly based on their vague description within the Book of Enoch and role as the supposed origin of monsters, moving away from their traditional portrayal as humanoid giants. He also played against expectations by not making the Grigori conventionally beautiful and young. Each of the bosses were designed around the personalities of the Grigori.

=== Audio ===
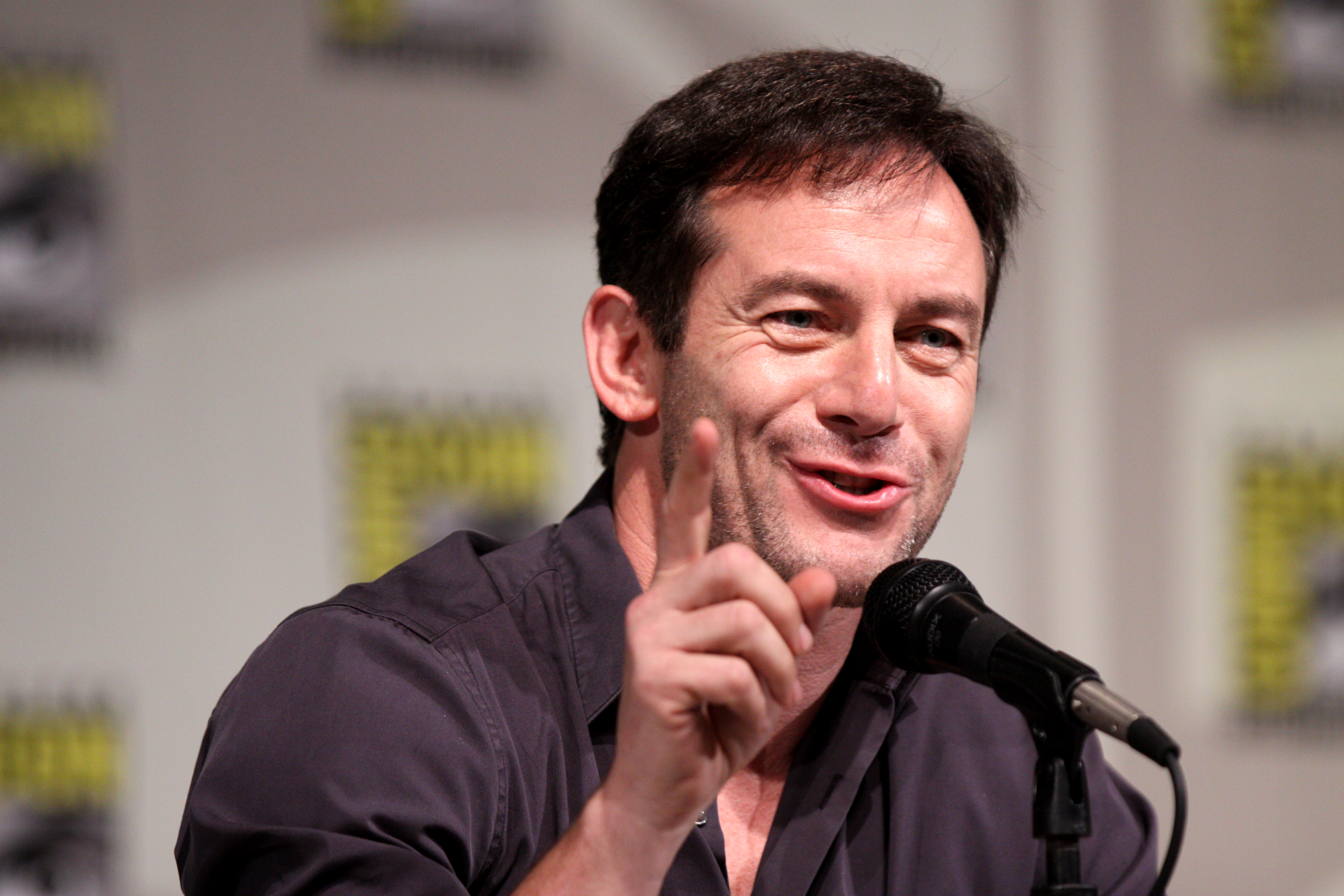
The characters were voiced by British multimedia actors, with the character Lucifel voiced by Jason Isaacs (pictured 2011).

During the early stages of development, Takeyasu wanted the game voiced only in English, but Japanese voice acting was included to appeal to the domestic audience; to compensate, the Japanese cast was chosen based on their voices sounding "foreign" over anything else. Enoch and Lucifel are respectively voiced by Shin-ichiro Miki and Ryōta Takeuchi, while Nana was voiced by Emiri Katō as a child and Yuka Naka as an adult. The English voice cast included actors who had been featured in films, television and video games. These included Blake Ritson as Enoch, Jason Isaacs as Lucifel, and Samantha Francis as Nanna. The English voice acting was recorded in Britain, with Ignition making an effort to move away from the poorly-received voice acting of their earlier titles including Arc Rise Fantasia.

The game's audio and music were handled by studio Design Wave. The music was co-composed and arranged by Masato Kouda and Kento Hasegawa, the audio director was Atsushi Mori, while Yuuki Toujinbara was sound designer. Further arrangements were handled by Imagine Music's Akifumi Tada, Hayato Matsuo, Shirō Hamaguchi, Kazuhiko Sawaguchi, and Keiji Inai. For his instructions on the score, Takeyasu used African music as a reference. The musical inspiration as a whole was taken from the game's visual design. As with his earlier work, Kouda translated the dominant color of the game into its musical equivalent and used that as the foundation for the score. For El Shaddai, its dominant color white translated into C Major, with the music being written in that key. The religious subject matter prompted the use of an organ and choir as the dominant instruments.

Kouda made a conscious effort not to emulate Gregorian chants, which were commonly associated with religious elements, with the final wide range of songs composed to match the game's many environments. Music for the Nephilim stages was made "cute" with additional elements. During the later development issues when the game content was being changed rapidly, there was friction between Takeyasu and Hasegawa that Kouda had to mediate. The main theme, composed by Kouda and incorporating both orchestra and chorus, took six months to compose and finalise. The choral work was performed by the Eminence Symphonic Choir, which recorded their sections over Skype with the music studio in Japan. An English-speaking choir was chosen to lend a specific sound to the lyric pronunciation. The in-game lyrics, while modelled roughly on Latin, were not a real language. Takeyasu wanted a fictional language to fit the game's tone, so asked Kouda and the chorus to create it. Lyrics in either English or Japanese were rejected as they would clash with the game's atmosphere.

== Release ==
El Shaddai was announced in May 2010 through an issue of Japanese gaming magazine Famitsu. Its release in North America and Europe the following month. The pitch movie was shown as a trailer at the 2010 Tokyo Game Show. The game saw an unexpected surge in popularity due to its art style, subject matter, and characters. One line from the trailer, with Lucifel asking if Enoch has enough armour, quickly became an internet meme. Both Takeyasu and Ignition's Shane Bettenhausen was pleased with the reaction, as Ignition was a small publisher in Japan and El Shaddai was a new IP which was becoming more difficult to launch and make successful.

A demo was released in Japan on April 14, 2011. The game released in Japan on April 28. UTV Ignition distributed the different versions in partnership with Sony and Microsoft respectively in the region. The 360 version was reissued on May 17, 2012, as part of the "Xbox Encore" line. In North America, the game was released on August 16, 2011. In Europe and Australia, it released respective on September 8 and 15. Konami acted as distributor in PAL territories.

To promote the title, UTV Ignition launched an extensive marketing and promotional campaign for the title, with UTV Ignition locking a minimum guarantee of $10 million revenue and seeking out collaborative rights and exploring a potential film adaptation. According to Bettenhausen, El Shaddai was being planned as a brand, with potential spin-off titles on other platforms. The promotional collaborations included clothing brand Edwin creating jeans modelled on Enoch and Lucifel's own, and Bandai also produced several figurines. A soundtrack album was published by Square Enix on April 27, 2011. Virtua Fighter 5 included themed costumes and titles to promote the title.

With support from former Ignition staff member Kazuhiro Takeshita, who was determined to preserve the IP following Ignition Tokyo's closure, Takeyasu and his company Crim successfully purchased the El Shaddai IP in 2013. Crim ported the game to Windows and released it worldwide through Steam on September 2, 2021. The release came packaged with a post-game novel focusing on Lucifel, and a digital artbook and soundtrack were released alongside it. A version was published by Crim for the Amazon Luna cloud platform on August 3, 2022.

A Nintendo Switch port was announced in April 2022. There were technical issues predicted with porting a PS3 title to the Switch, but Nakamura used an engine licensed from Aqualead to run the game. They managed to get improved visuals and a 60 frames per second game speed. Takeyasu stated that the Switch port would have been "impossible" without the earlier PC version for reference. It was in a playable state in August 2022. It was published worldwide digitally by Crim, and physically by Rainy Frog in Japan, on April 28, 2024. Described as an HD remaster, it was released with standard and limited editions, and included an artbook and a sequel novella. The added material in the Steam and Switch releases were intended to fill in the story left unfinished with the original release. A PlayStation 5 port was announced in September 2024.

As part of the game's marketing and his later expansions upon the world and mythology, Takeyasu created and supervised multimedia projects including a manga prequel, a number of novels and short stories following related characters such as the Grigori, mobile spin-off games, and art exhibitions portraying the characters and setting. After acquiring the El Shaddai IP, Takeyasu created a concept dubbed the "Mythical Concept"; inspired by the Cthulhu Mythos, it was based around stories drawing inspiration from world mythology and tying into each other in loose ways to which people could contribute with original art and media projects. A game based on the Mythical Concept, The Lost Child, was developed by Crim and released on PlayStation 4 and PlayStation Vita. This was followed by Mythical Concept: Starnaut on April 28th, 2025.

== Reception ==
Reception

Aggregate score
Aggregator	Score
Metacritic	78/100 (PS3); 75/100 (X360); 71/100 (PC)

Review scores
Publication	Score
1Up.com	B
Edge	8/10
Electronic Gaming Monthly	7/10
Eurogamer	9/10
Famitsu	37/40
Game Informer	9/10
GameSpot	8/10
GameTrailers	8.6/10
IGN	5/10
Joystiq	4.5/5
PALGN	7½/10
Play	77%

Both the PS3 and 360 versions saw "generally favourable" reviews, receiving scores of 78 and 75 out of 100 on review aggregator website Metacritic, based on 46 and 44 reviews respectively. The Windows release earned a score of 71 out of 100 based on 12 reviews. Reception was generally positive, with critics often focusing praise on its visuals, and the variety of its gameplay and level design.

Japanese gaming magazine Famitsu praised the "mysterious" story and characters, while Keza MacDonald of Eurogamer felt having "absolutely no idea what's going on" added to the game's attraction. Tom McShae of GameSpot felt players would have trouble understanding the story, a sentiment echoed by GameTrailers. Andrew Fitch, writing for Electronic Gaming Monthly, was surprised at the game's faithfullness to the original text, and praised Ignition's localization as an improvement over earlier titles. Game Informer's Andrew Reiner was likewise positive about the English voice acting. Edge Magazine felt it would be best for players to ignore the story due to its fragmented and confusing presentation. PALGN's Jarrod Mawson was unimpressed by the story overall despite a strong prologue, while IGN's Colin Moriarty was generally negative beyond the premise.

Famitsu enjoyed the combat system, though some reviewers noted difficulty with the 2D platforming sections. Fitch found the gameplay generally enjoyable and praised the variety of level presentation. MacDonald noted the wide variety of gameplay settings, finding herself disoriented at times and always enjoying the experience. Edge enjoyed both the combat, and the platforming sections as enjoyable and challenging. Reiner "wholeheartedly loved" the title, praising the combat as having hidden depth and replay value. GameTrailers positively noted the variety of gameplay scenarios keeping El Shaddai from going stale. McShae was surprised by the combat's depth, citing it as one of the game's strong points, but faulted the camera control during 3D platforming sections. JC Fletcher of Joystiq cited the gameplay as a fresh take on the genre despite some issues with platforming and the camera, while Mawson felt the combat lacked variety and evolution to sustain the entire experience. In an import review, Daniel Feit of Play Magazine noted a lack of effective communication to the player during combat, worsened in places by the camera behavior. Jose Otero of 1Up.com enjoyed the gameplay up to a point, but similarly noted a lack of explanation might leave players at a disadvantage. Moriarty disliked the gameplay, finding the combat shallow and repetitive. Other reviewers also shared this criticism.

Famitsu praised the variety and design of the graphics and designs, and Edge said they added to the overall feel of the gameplay. Reiner positively compared the game's graphics to moving museum pieces, and GameTrailers found the visual variety engaging if sometimes overwhelming. MacDonald lauded the varied visual design, but noted the 3D platforming sections suffered from the in-game graphics. McShae mirrored MacDonald's praise, calling the game "an absolute pleasure to stare at". Fitch enjoyed the visual variety, but felt it sometimes intruded upon the gameplay. Fletcher felt the graphics were best shown off with the different areas within the Grigori's tower. Mawson cited the graphics as the main appeal of the game. Feit lauded the visual design, positively noting the lack of a traditional UI and feeling that the visual design made up for some of the gameplay problems. The graphics were one of the few elements given full praise by Moriarty, though he faulted the lack of a HUD. The music also met with general praise.

=== Sales and awards ===
During its first week on sale in Japan, both versions of El Shaddai were among the top fifteen best-selling games, with the PS3 version reaching third place with sales of over 58,000 copies. By the end of 2011, the PS3 version had sold over 75,200 units, while the 360 version sold over 12,000. El Shaddai failed to enter the top 40 all-platforms sales chart, which it reached #27 and #37 in the PS3 and 360 charts respectively. It was noted that Ignition's later layoffs were due to a number of commercial failures. Speaking in a 2024 interview, Takeyasu noted that while not a hit, it sold reasonably well. In another interview that year, he called sales of the Steam release "satisfactory".

During its exhibition at the 2010 Tokyo Game Show, El Shaddai was among the titles given the "Future Game" award. During its 2011 ceremony, National Academy of Video Game Trade Reviewers nominated the game in the "Art Direction, Fantasy", "Control Design, 3D" and "Original Dramatic Score, New IP" categories. At the 2012 Game Developers Choice Awards, the game was nominated in the "Best Visual Arts".
