= God Wars: Future Past =

2017 Japanese folklore-inspired tactical role-playing game

- European PlayStation 4 cover art
- Developer: Kadokawa Games
- Publishers: JP: Kadokawa Games; WW: NIS America
- Director: Yoshimi Yasuda
- Artists: Mino Taro; Sawaki Takeyasu
- Writer: Yoshimi Yasuda
- Composer: Takashi Nitta
- Platforms: PlayStation 4; PlayStation Vita; Nintendo Switch; Microsoft Windows
- Release: PlayStation 4, PlayStation Vita: EU: June 16, 2017; NA: June 20, 2017; JP: June 22, 2017; AU: June 23, 2017; Nintendo Switch: WW: September 4, 2018; Microsoft Windows: WW: June 14, 2019
- Genre: Tactical role-playing
- Mode: Single-player

God Wars: Future Past is a tactical role-playing game developed by Kadokawa Games, and published by NIS America outside of Japan. The original version of the game was released in June 2017 for the PS4 and PS Vita. An expanded version of the game, God Wars: The Complete Legend, was released worldwide on the Nintendo Switch on September 4, 2018. The expanded version was also released on PS4 and PS Vita exclusively in Japan.

== Gameplay ==
The game plays as a tactical role-playing game, with the player navigating a team of characters across a grid in order to defeat an opposing party of characters in turn-based combat. It is made up of chapters, with small episodes for each chapter. It's "hard to miss anything in the game as you can always go back and do things later." Besides the main story, players can attempt Shrine Battles for additional experience points and equipment. The player can level up the shrine to increase the bonuses that can be received if they worship.

=== Battle ===
In fights, the player would "align characters on a grid based map in an isometric" pattern. The characters are strategies placed on tiles to "measure their attack ranges and effects." The player take turns "according to speed rating." Characters can create larger amounts of damage to enemies, either by attacking from behind or attacking from "higher ground."

Impurity is a stat that "increases and decreases" the chances of a character being "attacked in battle." It increases or decreases, depending on the player's actions when fighting on the battlefield and pushes the player to come up with strategies when attacking or when using powerful spells.

In battle, enemies will often use status effects and debuffs. If the player characters get hit they can lose the ability to move freely or damage the characters health. If the character has been hit with a status effect, the player can use healing abilities to stop the status effect.

=== Job Classes ===
Characters can have three jobs. The three job categories are a "main job, a sub job, and a unique job that can't be changed." There are "basic jobs like warrior and priest" which can also branch out further into "specialised classes like samurai or monk. These can also be further advanced to classes like Confucian or Herculean." Jobs can determine "both stat growth" and the chances of learning new skills that can be unlocked and improved with "Job Points which are earned in combat."

There are 23 classes that the player can learn. The player can make characters "Archers, Barrierists, Celestials, Champions, Chanters, Confucians, Daredevils, Elementals, Herculeans, Hunters, Incantors, Magicians, Maidens, Monks, Priests, Ritualists, Samurai, Shintoists, Spiritualists, Tengus, Warriors, and Warrioresses." Characters get their "own unique skills", which are both active and passive but "only that one character can learn." Jobs offer both "offensive and defensive abilities" with also "status afflicting" skills.

=== Equipment ===
"Weapons and armour can change effectiveness depending on the height and range of the character" on the battlefield. If a character is above an enemy the damage will be much greater than if the character is next to the enemy. This also applies to enemy attacks, so if they attack from behind, their weapons do a lot more damage than if they are in front.

== Story ==
God Wars: Future Past goes "all the way back to the roots of Japan's mythic past." By using "characters and elements" from the Kojiki, "Japan's oldest remaining historical chronicle, as well as the chronicles of Shaka, which is Japan's take on the historical Buddha." The story is set in Mizuho, which is divided into the Kingdoms of Fuji, Izumo and Hyuga and ruled by the three great leaders Amaterasu, Tsukuyomi, and Susanoo. "Thirteen years prior to the game, Tsukuyomi sacrificed one of her daughters" "Sakuya to the volcano", to bring peace and a "period of calm" to the world. Back to the present where the game is set, the world is in chaos again and Tsukuyomi the queen of the Fuji Nation goes missing. This makes the "Myriad Gods anger intensify", bringing more chaos to the land. "Princess Kaguya, the youngest daughter of Tsukuyomi", is the next sacrifice. However, with her friend Kintaro’s influence" Kaguya decides to escape in order to witness the situation first hand, as well as find her missing mother and "learn about the truth of her imprisonment."

== Development ==
The game was first announced by Kadokawa Games in November 2014 under its codename Project Code: Tsukiyomi. Upon its first reveal, it was merely referred to as a simulation role-playing game with Japanese themes for PlayStation consoles, without mentioning any specific systems. The game was first announced under its officially name, God Wars: Beyond Time, a year later in November 2015, alongside another Kadakowa Games title Root Letter. The game contains character artwork from Mino Taro of the Love Plus series of video games and creature/monster designs by Sawaki Takeyasu, the creature designer for games like Devil May Cry, Ōkami and El Shaddai: Ascension of the Metatron. While the game's reveal was strictly a Japanese event, journalists noted that slides from the presentation referred to the title being scheduled for a "worldwide release" in 2016. After multiple delays, the game was released in June 2017.

== Reception and sales ==
Reception

Aggregate score
Aggregator	Score
Metacritic	PS4: 74/100; VITA: 74/100; NS: 70/100

Review scores
Publication	Score
Destructoid	6.5/10
Push Square	6/10 stars
RPGFan	77/100
PlayStation Lifestyle	8/10

The PS4 released of the game received mixed reviews from critics. At Metacritic, which assigns a normalized rating out of 100 to reviews from mainstream critics, the game has an average score of 74 out of 100, which indicates "mixed or average reviews" based on 16 reviews.

Martin Patiño from PlayStation Lifestyle gave the game an 8 out of 10, criticising the dated 3D visuals and awkward dialogue but praising the 2D visuals, gameplay, characters and progression system, stating: "In spite its few flaws, SRPG fans will surely enjoy this latest outing by Kadokawa Games and newcomers who are able to take the genre’s traditionally slower pace may find themselves hooked."

The game's initial release across PS4 and Vita had sold over 100,000 copies worldwide as of June 27, 2017.
