= El Shaddai (disambiguation) =

El Shaddai is a Judaic name for God.

El Shaddai may also refer to:

- Shaddai (disambiguation), a Semitic Bronze Age city and the deity worshipped there
- El Shaddai (movement), a Catholic Charismatic Renewal movement
- El Shaddai International Christian Centre, a group of churches
- "El Shaddai" (song), a Contemporary Christian song
- El Shaddai: Ascension of the Metatron, a 2011 action video game for the PlayStation 3 and Xbox 360

== See also ==
- God Almighty (disambiguation)
