= Daniel (angel) =

Watcher, an angel in the Book of Enoch

Daniel (Hebrew: דניאל, Ancient Greek: Δανειήλ), also spelled Dânêl, is an angel, the seventh mentioned of the 20 Watcher leaders of the 200 angels in the Book of Enoch, who taught the "signs of the sun" to humans. The name is translated by Michael Knibb as "God has judged".

Conversely, according to Francis Barrett in The Magus, Daniel is the name of one of the 72 holy angels bearing the name of God, Shemhamphorae.

== See also ==
- Chazaqiel
- Ramiel
- List of angels in theology
- Bearers of the Throne
