= Bezaliel =

Figure in the Book of Enoch

Bezaliel, also Busasejal or Basasael, (Aramaic: ניאל and Greek: Θωνιήλ, meaning "damaged"), was the 13th watcher of the 20 leaders of the 200 fallen angels that are mentioned in an ancient work called the Book of Enoch. This angel is probably one of the most controversial of the list of fallen angels in the Book of Enoch. He is often left off the list of angels from chapter 6 as a result of the problematic transmission of the text. The R. H. Charles translation from 1917 does not include him on the list of 20 leaders. Michael A. Knibb says as of 1982 there were various translations of the name all with different names and meanings. The name Bezaliel (Shadow of God) is taken from chapter 69 and is the 13th angel listed there.

Bezaliel has been rarely mentioned in texts.

== See also ==
- List of angels in theology
