= Shada =

Shada or SHADA may refer to:

- Shada (Doctor Who), an unaired serial of Doctor Who
- USS Shada (SP-580), a United States Navy patrol vessel
- Sexual Health and Disability Alliance
- Société Haitiano-Américaine de Développement Agricole, a Haiti–United States agricultural venture
- Jada Shada Hudson, Haitian-Canadian drag queen

== See also ==
- Shaddai (disambiguation)
- Shadda, an emphasis symbol in the Arabic alphabet
- Şada, a village in Azerbaijan
- Shadaa, 2019 Indian Punjabi-language romantic comedy film
