= Shaddai =

Shaddai may refer to:

- Possibly the Amorite name of an ancient city in Syria, see Tell eth-Thadeyn
- A term for the God of the Bible, sometimes in the form El Shaddai
- Shaddai (leafhopper), an insect genus in the tribe Alebrini

== See also ==
- El Shaddai (disambiguation)
- Shada (disambiguation)
