= Sawaki Takeyasu =

Video game artist, producer and director

- 竹安 佐和記
- Born: August 30, 1973 (age 52); Osaka, Japan
- Occupations: Video game director, producer, artist
- Years active: 2001–present
- Known for: El Shaddai: Ascension of the Metatron

Sawaki Takeyasu (竹安 佐和記, Takeyasu Sawaki) (born August 30, 1973) is a Japanese video game artist, producer and director. Currently the head of his own development studio Crim, Takeyasu previously worked at Capcom and their subsidiary Clover Studio before becoming a freelance artist following Clover's dissolution in 2007.

== Works ==
Year	Title	Role
2001	Devil May Cry	Character CG artwork, character designer
2002	Steel Battalion	Mech designer
2004	Steel Battalion: Line of Contact	Mech designer
2006	Ōkami	Character and monster designer
2008	Fatal Frame: Mask of the Lunar Eclipse	Character designer
2009	Infinite Space	Character designer
2011	El Shaddai: Ascension of the Metatron	Director, character designer
2012	El Shaddai Social Battle	Character designer
2017	Gravity Rush 2	The Ark of Time: Raven's Choice monster designer
2017	God Wars: Future Past	Monster designer
2017	The Lost Child	Producer, character and monster designer
2024	Starnaut	Director
