= Good God Almighty =

Good God Almighty may refer to:

- "Good God Almighty" (Crowder song), a 2021 song by Crowder
- "Good God Almighty", a 1964 jazz standard from The Blues (Alex Harvey album)
- "Good God Almighty", a 2003 song by Nappy Roots from Wooden Leather

== See also ==
- God Almighty (disambiguation)
