= Arakiel =

Fallen angel in early Hebrew texts

Arakiel (Greek: ‘Αραθάκ Κιμβρά), also spelled Arâkîba, Araqiel, Araqael, Araciel, Arqael, Sarquael, Arkiel or Arkas, is a fallen angel, the second mentioned of the 20 Watcher leaders of the 200 fallen angels in the Book of Enoch, who taught the "signs of the earth" (which suggests geomancy) to humans during the days of Jared.

His name is generally translated as "earth of God"; the combination of araq-earth (Babylonian in origin) and El-God. Michael Knibb lists him as a combination of two names “the land of the mighty one” or “the land is mighty”. According to the sibylline oracles he is a holy angel that leads souls to judgment along with Ramiel, Aziel, Uriel and Samiel.

Arakiel is also called Artāqīfā or Arstikapha, later interpreted as Aretztikapha (meaning "world of distortion" [the combination of eretz + kaphah]) in Chapter 68 or 69 of the Book of Enoch depending on the translation.

== See also ==
- Samyaza
- List of angels in theology
