= The Lost Child (video game) =

2017 video game

- European cover art
- Developer: Crim
- Publishers: JP: Kadokawa Games; WW: NIS America
- Director: Hitoshi "Zin" Hasegawa
- Producer: Sawaki Takeyasu
- Designers: Kise Oota; Moyuru Matsumoto
- Artists: Sawaki Takeyasu; Narayuki Takahashi; Kentaro Maruta
- Composer: Takayuki Nakamura
- Platforms: PlayStation 4; PlayStation Vita; Nintendo Switch
- Release: JP: August 24, 2017 (PS4, PSV); NA: June 19, 2018; EU: June 22, 2018; AU: July 6, 2018
- Genres: Role-playing, dungeon crawler
- Mode: Single-player

The Lost Child (Note: Japanese: ザ・ロスト・チャイルド, Hepburn: Za Rosuto Chairudo) is a 2017 role-playing videogame developed by Crim for the PlayStation 4, PlayStation Vita and Nintendo Switch. Set in modern-day Tokyo, The Lost Child is a follow-up to 2011's El Shaddai: Ascension of the Metatron. The game was removed from all digital platforms in European, American, Asian and Oceania regions on 18 June 2023 and can no longer be purchased. This was due to Dragami Games taking over the publishing rights.

== Development ==
In May 2013, it was announced that Sawaki Takeyasu, creator, director and lead artist of El Shaddai: Ascension of the Metatron, had purchased the rights to the El Shaddai IP from UTV Ignition Games with the intention of expanding it under his newly-formed development studio Crim. In 2017 at a Tokyo Sandbox presentation, Takeyasu teased a "major announcement" relating to the IP to be made within the next two weeks, which was officially revealed ten days later in Famitsu as The Lost Child, a role-playing game for the PlayStation 4 and PlayStation Vita set in the El Shaddai universe.

It was announced in August 2017 that Sony Interactive Entertainment would be publishing and providing localisation of the game in Chinese territories. In September 2017, it was announced by NIS America that the game would be receiving a Western release, with a Nintendo Switch port also being announced for the West in February 2018.

== Reception ==
The Lost Child received "mixed or average" reviews according to review aggregator Metacritic.

Reception

Aggregate score
Aggregator	Score
Metacritic	(PS4) 62/100 (NS) 63/100

Review scores
Publication	Score
Hardcore Gamer	2.5/5
Nintendo Life	5/10
Nintendo World Report	8/10
Push Square	5/10
RPGamer	3.5/5
RPGFan	70/100
