= God Almighty (disambiguation) =

God Almighty is a common, even though debated, translation of El Shaddai, which is a Hebrew name for God.

God Almighty may also refer to:

- "God Almighty", a 2003 song from Soundtrack to a Revolution by The Insyderz
- "God Almighty", a 2008 song from Hello Love (Chris Tomlin album)
- "God Almighty, None Compares", a 2008 song from Church Music by David Crowder Band

== See also ==
- Good God Almighty (disambiguation)
- El Shaddai (disambiguation)
