= Yomiel =

Fallen angel from the Book of Enoch

Yomiel, Yomyael, or Jômjâêl in later translations (Aramaic: יוםיאל, Greek: ‘Ιωμειήλ) was the 19th Watcher of the 20 leaders of the 200 fallen angels that are mentioned in an ancient work called the Book of Enoch. Michael Knibb translates the Ethiopic version of his name as "Day of God".

== See also ==
- List of angels in theology
