= Shamsiel =

16th Watcher mentioned in the Book of Enoch

Shamsiel (Hebrew and Aramaic: שִׁמְשִׁיאֵל Šīmšīʾēl, "God is my sun" Greek: Σεμσιήλ Semsiḗl), also spelled Samsâpêêl, Shamshel, Shashiel or Shamshiel, was the 16th Watcher of the 20 leaders of the 200 fallen angels that are mentioned in the Book of Enoch. The name means "God is my sun", which is fitting since it has been said that Shamsiel taught men the signs of the sun during the days of Jared or Yered. Shamash (the Babylonian sun god) may share some mythological basis with Shamsiel.

Shamsiel is said to lead 365 legions of lesser angels in the Zohar and it is said that he was assigned by God to guard the Garden of Eden after Adam and Eve were expelled; comparable to cherubim. There is apparently some disagreement in sources as to whether Shamsiel is a fallen angel; he is still regarded as the ruler of the 4th Heaven.

== Modern culture ==
There is a monstrous "angel" named Shamshel in the anime series called Neon Genesis Evangelion, ostensibly named for the ancient Hebrew entity.

A minor character named Samchia appears in the first book in The Fallen series. He is a fallen angel living on earth as "Samuel Chia" and is the second in-series victim of the books' primary antagonist Verchiel, who kills him by kicking him from a high window.

In the anime Fairy Tail, a character named Angel can use Angel Magic summoning forth Shamsiel, a white cherub that can shoot light to blast the latter's opponents.

A succubus by the name of Shamsiel Shahar is a main character in the erotic visual novel Kyonyuu Fantasy and its anime adaptation of the same name, serving as a benefactor and primary love interest of the protagonist, Lute Hende.

== See also ==
- List of angels in theology
