= Baraqiel =

Biblical angel

Baraqiel (Imperial Aramaic: 𐡁𐡓𐡒𐡀𐡋; Aramaic: ברקאל; Greek: Βαρακιήλ, Βαρακήλ) was the 9th watcher of the 20 leaders of the 200 fallen angels that are mentioned in an ancient work called the Book of Enoch. The name means "lightning of God", which is fitting since it has been said that Baraqiel taught men astrology during the days of Jared or Yered.

It has also been proposed based on a reconstruction by Schniedewind and Zuckerman that Baraqiel was the name of the father of Hazael, mentioned in the 9th century BCE inscription from Tel Dan. The biblical figure, Barak, known from Judges 4 is a shortened version of this longer name.

== See also ==
- List of angels in theology
