= Batariel =

Angel in Judaism

Batriel, Batârêl (Aramaic: מטראל, Greek: Βατριήλ) or Matriel or Matariel, Matârêl (prob. composed of matar, "rain", + el, "God"; lit. "Rain of God") was the 12th Watcher of the 20 leaders of the 200 fallen angels that are mentioned in an ancient work called the Book of Enoch. The name is generally believed to be "valley of God" bathar-el and Babylonian in origin. Michael Knibb lists the translation for this Angel based on the Ethiopic Book of Enoch as "Rain of God".

== See also ==
- List of angels in theology
