= Chazaqiel =

Figure in the Book of Enoch

Chazaqiel (Imperial Aramaic: זיקיאל, Ancient Greek: Εζεκιήλ), also Shahaqiel or Êzêqêêl, was the 8th Watcher of the 20 leaders of the 200 fallen angels that are mentioned in an ancient work called The Book of Enoch. The name means "cloud of God", and it was said that Chazaqiel taught men the knowledge of the clouds, meteorology. Michael Knibb translates this angel as being the "Shooting star of God".

== See also ==
- List of angels in theology
