= Armaros =

Figure in the Book of Enoch

Armârôs (Aramaic: תרמני, Greek: Αρεαρώς, Arearṓs) was the 11th watcher on a list of 20 leaders of a group of 200 fallen angels called Grigori or "Watchers" in the Book of Enoch. The name means "cursed one" or "accursed one". The name 'Armaros' is likely a Greek corruption of what may be originally an Aramaic name, Armoni. In accordance to that possible original name, he may be identified as Armoniel or Harmoniel (curse, consecration, or forbiddenness of God), also mentioned in chapter 7 in the Book of Enoch). Michael Knibb, Professor of Old Testament Studies at King's College London, lists the meaning of his name as being "the one from Hermon".

"Then sware they all together and bound themselves by mutual imprecations upon it. And they were in all two hundred; who descended in the days of Jared on the summit of Mount Hermon, and they called it Mount Hermon, because they had sworn and bound themselves by mutual imprecations upon it." - Book of Enoch

== See also ==
- List of angels in theology
