= Sathariel =

Angel

Sathariel or Satariel (Hebrew: סתריאל, Ancient Greek: Σαθιήλ, romanized: Sathiḗl) is described in the Book of Enoch as the 17th Watcher of the 20 leaders of the 200 fallen angels. Michael Knibb believes the name to mean "Moon of God" or "Dawn of God" based on the Ge'ez copies of the Book of Enoch.

Sathariel is said to be the qliphah of Binah, and described as concealers, by the Hermetic Order of the Golden Dawn and Aleister Crowley. Crowley associates Sathariel with Satan and Moloch.
