= Year 6000 =

Jewish eschatology concept

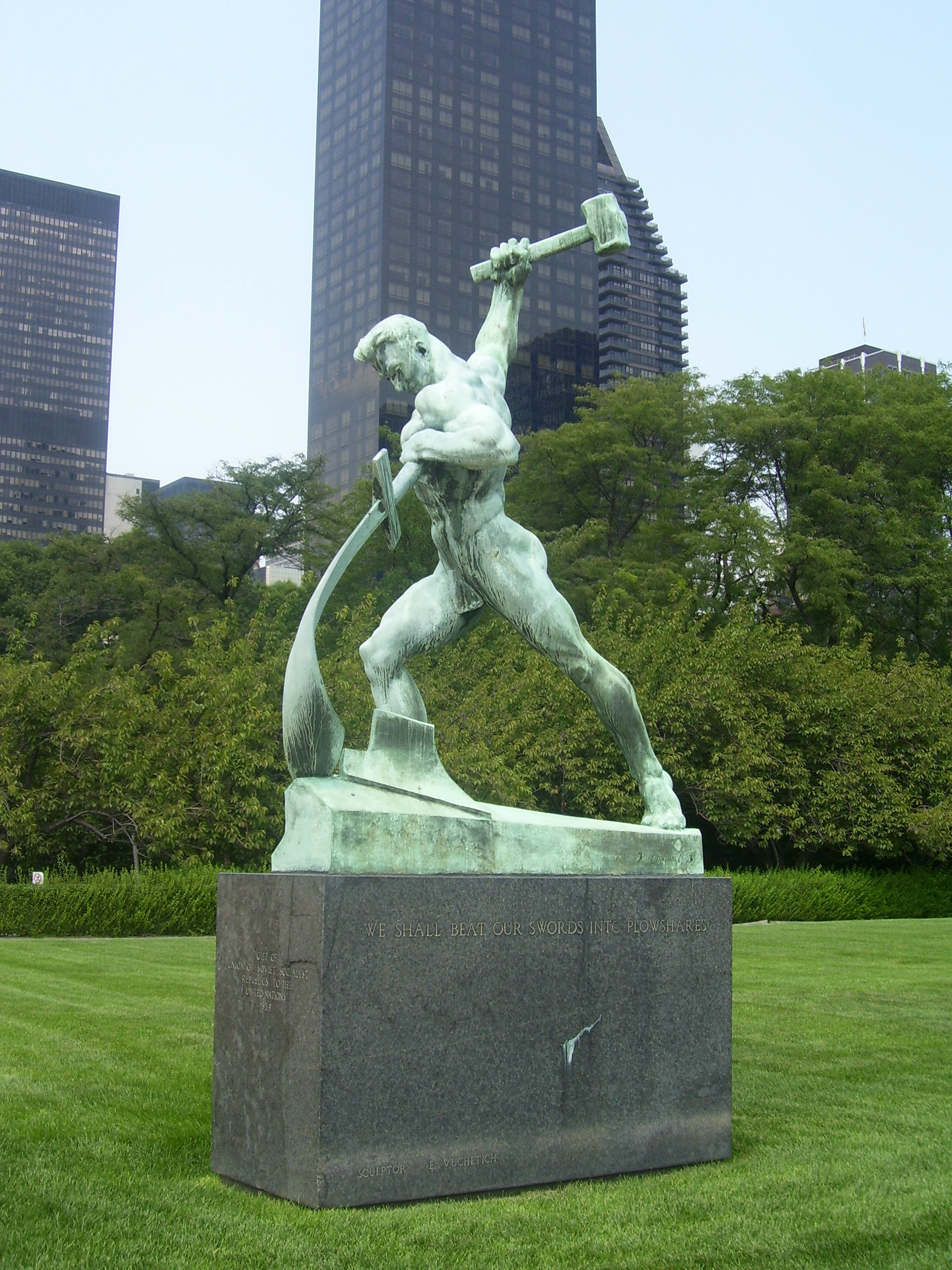
Universal peace is one of the themes of the Messianic Age in Judaism as shown in the Let Us Beat Swords into Plowshares sculpture by the socialist realist Yevgeny Vuchetich, United Nations Art Collection.

The Hebrew year 6000 marks according to classical Rabbinical Jewish sources, the latest time for the initiation of the Messianic Age. The Talmud, Midrash, Pirkei De-Rabbi Eliezer, and Zohar specify that the date by which the Messiah will appear is 6,000 years from creation.

According to tradition, the Anno Mundi calendar started at the time of creation, placed at 3761 BCE. The current (2026/2027) Hebrew year is 5787. By this calculation, the start of the 6000th year would occur at nightfall of 29 September 2239 and the end would occur at nightfall of 16 September 2240 on the Gregorian calendar.

== Background and analysis ==
The belief that the seventh millennium will correspond to the Messianic Age is founded upon a universalized application of the concept of Shabbat, the seventh day of the week. Based on Psalms 90:4, one of "God's days" is believed to correspond to 1000 years of normal human existence. Just as (in the Bible) God created the world in six days of work and sanctified the seventh day (Saturday) as a day of rest, it is believed that six millennia of normal life will be followed by one millennium of rest. Just as Shabbat is the sanctified 'day of rest' and peace, a time representing joyful satisfaction with the labors completed within the previous 6 days, so too the seventh millennium will correspond to a universal 'day of rest' and peace, a time of 'completeness' of the 'work' performed in the previous six millennia.

The Talmud also makes parallels between the Shmita (Sabbatical) year and the seventh millennium: For six millennia the earth will be worked, while during the seventh millennium the world will remain 'fallow'.

According to two opinions in the Talmud (Rav Katina and Abaye), the world will be harov (ruined or desolate) during the seventh millennium, suggesting a less positive outcome.

The reconciliation between the traditional Judaic age of the world and the current scientifically derived age of the world is beyond the scope of this article, with some taking a literal approach (as with the views of Young Earth creationism), and others (such as Gerald Schroeder) an approach conciliatory with secular scientific positions. The Jewish calendar begins with the creation of Adam, not the creation of the universe.

== Sources ==
=== The Talmud ===
The Talmud comments:

Rav Katina said: "Six thousand years the world will exist, and one [thousand] it shall be desolate (harov), as it is written, 'And the Lord alone shall be exalted in that day.' (Isaiah 2:11)"

Abaye said: "Two [thousand years it will be] desolate, as it is written: 'After two days will He revive us, on the third day He will raise us up, that we may live in His presence.' (Hosea 6:2).

A tanna taught per Rav Katina: "Just as the Shmita year occurs one year out of seven years, so too does the world have one thousand years out of seven thousand that are fallow (mushmat), as it is written, 'And the Lord alone shall be exalted in that day' (Isaiah 2:11); and further it is written, 'A psalm and song for the Shabbat day' (Psalms 92:1) – meaning the day that is altogether Shabbat – and also it is said, 'For one thousand years in Your [God's] eyes are but a day that has passed.' (Psalms 90:4)"

The Tanna deBei Eliyahu Rabbah taught: "The world consists of six thousand years: two thousand unformed (tohu), two thousand of Torah, two thousand years the era of the messiah—but due to our many sins many of those have already been lost."

=== The Midrash ===
The Midrash in Pirqe deRabbi Eliezer comments, "Six eons for going in and coming out, for war and peace. The seventh eon is entirely Shabbat and rest for life everlasting."

=== The Zohar ===
The Zohar states, "In the 600th year of the sixth thousand [i.e., 5600, or 1839–1840 CE], the gates of wisdom on high and the wellsprings of lower wisdom will be opened. This will prepare the world to enter the seventh thousand, just as man prepares himself toward sunset on Friday for the Sabbath."

The Zohar explains further, "The redemption of Israel will come about through the mystic force of the letter "Vav" [which has the numerical value of six], namely, in the sixth millennium. ... Happy are those who will be left alive at the end of the sixth millennium to enter the Shabbat, which is the seventh millennium; for that is a day set apart for the Holy One on which to effect the union of new souls with old souls in the world."

The Zohar also maintains that each of the seven days of creation in Genesis chapter one corresponds to one millennium of the existence of natural creation. In this framework, Shabbat corresponds to the seventh millennium, the age of universal 'rest'—the Messianic Era.

=== Rishonim and Acharonim ===
Elaborating on the theme of the seventh millennium representing the Messianic Age are numerous early and more recent Jewish scholars, including Rashi, the Nahmanides, Hayyim ben Joseph Vital, Isaac Abarbanel, Abraham ibn Ezra, Bahya ibn Paquda, Yaakov Culi, the Vilna Gaon, Yosef Yitzchak Schneersohn, the Moshe Chaim Luzzatto, and Aryeh Kaplan.

The acceptance of the idea of the seventh millennium representing the Messianic Age across the Ashkenazi–Sephardi divide, the Chassidim–Misnagdim divide, and across the rational Talmud and mystical Kabbalah perspectives, shows the centrality of this idea in traditional Judaism.

==== Rashi ====
The French rabbi Rashi draws a parallel between the rest experienced presently on Shabbat and that which will be experienced in the seventh millennium: “The world is decreed to last for six thousand years, as the days of the week, the seventh day of the week is Shabbat; so too in the seventh millennium, there will there be tranquility in the world.”

==== Nahmanides ====
Nahmanides wrote that the sixth millennium will see the coming of the Messiah, and the seventh millennium will be the Shabbat of the 'World to Come', wherein the righteous will be resurrected and rejoice. He argued that Genesis 2:3 ("And God blessed the seventh day and sanctified it") refers to His blessing the World to Come, which begins at the seventh millennium.

==== Bahya ====
Bahya ben Asher wrote that the seventh millennium will follow the Messiah and the resurrection and will be a time of “great eternal delight” for those who merit resurrection. This being the case, he explained, just as one prepares during the six days of the week for the Shabbat, so too should one prepare during the six thousand years for the seventh.

==== Issac Abarbanel ====
The Portuguese born rabbi Isaac Abarbanel wrote that similar to the structure of the week of Creation, so too the world will exist for six thousand years, with the seventh millennium being a Hefsek (break) and a Shvita (rest), like Shabbat, Shmita, and Jubilee.

==== Hayyim ben Joseph Vital ====
Hayyim ben Joseph Vital wrote that whoever wants to know what will happen in the end days should study the first seven days. Each day of creation represents 1000 years, and the seventh 'day,' beginning in the year 6000, represents the day of rest.

==== Yaakov Culi ====
In a section of Me'am Lo'ez elaborating on the parallels between the Exodus from Egypt and the Final Redemption, the Ottoman Rabbi Yaakov Culi writes: "It seems logical to assume that prayers said today for the redemption are more acceptable than those said in earlier times. ... In earlier times, the redemption was far in the future. Therefore, in order for their prayers to have any effect, people had to pray intensely. In those days, people were a thousand years from the time in which the redemption had to take place. Now, however, we are only 500, or 200, years away from the time, and the closer it comes, the easier it is for prayers to be accepted". In the footnote to this statement, Rabbi Aryeh Kaplan writes: "This was written in 5492 (1732). Since there was a tradition that the Messiah would have to come before the [end of the] year 6000 (2240), there was only [about] 500 years left until the redemption would have to come. There was also a tradition that the redemption would have to begin after 200 years [into the final 500 years], that is by 5700 ([i.e., 1939–]1940). This would seem to lend support to the contention that the formation of the modern state of Israel is the beginning of the redemption".

==== Vilna Gaon ====
Elijah ben Solomon Zalman wrote, "Each day of Creation alludes to a thousand years of our existence, and every little detail that occurred on these days will have its corresponding event happen at the proportionate time during its millennium."

The footsteps of Messiah (עִקְּבוֹת מְשִׁיחַ) began the first hour of Friday morning in the sixth millennium, that is the year Five Hundred [i.e. 1739–1740 CE], and from hour to hour the footsteps have continued to progress from many aspects [cf. M Avot 1:1; BT Sanhedrin 38a]. As is known, every hour consists of forty-one years and eight months [alt., 41.666], counting from the time that the bonds on the Messiah's heels were loosened, as it says, You have loosened my bonds (Psalms 116:16), and as revealed in: A decree He declared it for Joseph. … 'I delivered his shoulder from the burden his palms were loosed from the hod' (Psalms 81:6–7). Beginning with the second hour [i.e., from 8 months into 5541 (i.e., 1781 CE)], the entire House of Israel took the stage, both as a whole, and with regard to each individual member of the nation, as an order from above, of Messiah of the beginning of redemption, namely, Messiah Son of Joseph.

==== Moshe Chaim Luzzatto ====
The rabbi Moshe Chaim Luzzatto wrote that the seventh millennium will be a time of rest, which will be merited by the righteous.

==== Lubavitcher Rebbe ====
The Russian born Orthodox rabbi Menachem Mendel Schneerson explained that in the Hebrew year 5750 (i.e., 1989–1990 CE), the millennial 'time-clock' had reached the time of the 'eve' of Shabbat; that is to say, the equivalent to Friday afternoon before Shabbat. Just as solar noon marks the time when three-fourths (18 of 24 hours) of the Jewish day has passed, the year 5750 marks when three-fourths of the sixth millennium has passed.

In Jewish law, avoiding routine work for several hours (either 2.5 hours or 5.5 hours) preceding Shabbat to reserve time for Shabbat preparations is recommended. By analogy, one might prepare for the coming of the messiah before the year 6000; 2.5 or 5.5 hours would translate to approximately 104 or 229 years respectively, thus to the year 5896 (i.e., 2135–2136 CE) or 5771 (i.e., 2010–2011 CE).

The Lubavitcher Rebbe, as others, maintained that the Messiah must arrive at, or before, the onset of the Shabbat, the year 6000.

The end of the year 2026 CE falls during the Hebrew year 5787, which marks 12:53pm on the Millennial Friday.

==== Shlomo Elyashiv ====
The Lithuanian born Kabbalist Shlomo Elyashiv wrote in Drushei Olam HaTohu:

This is why so much time must transpire from the time of creation until the time of the Tikkun (lit. 'correction', Moshiach's coming). All the forces of Gevurot (strict judgement) are rooted in the six Sefirot—Chesed, Gevurah, Tiferet, Netzach, Hod, Yesod—which are the six days of creation ... and also the 6,000 years of history that the world will exist. And within [the six Sefirot] are the roots of all that will happen from the six days of creation until the Final Tikkun. ... We find that all that transpires is the result of the sparks from the time of Tohu, Chaos ...

==== Aryeh Kaplan ====
The American Orthodox rabbi Aryeh Kaplan writes:

Never before has mankind been faced with such a wide range of possibilities. Never before has it had such tremendous power at its disposal, to use for good or evil. ... We need not belabor the point, but the past hundred years or so have brought about an increase in knowledge unsurpassed in all human history. ... The ultimate goal of the historic process is the perfection of society ... is what we call the Messianic Age. ... Almost 2000 years ago, the Zohar predicted, "In the 600th year of the sixth thousand, the gates of wisdom on high and the wellsprings of lower wisdom will be opened. This will prepare the world to enter the seventh thousand, just as man prepares himself toward sunset on Friday for the Sabbath. It is the same here. And a mnemonic for this is (Gen 7:11), 'In the 600th year ... all the foundations of the great deep were split'. Here we see a clear prediction that in the Jewish year 5600 [i.e. 1839–1840], the wellsprings of lower wisdom would be opened and there would be a sudden expansion of secular knowledge.

==== Esther Jungreis ====
In an interview with Israel National Radio, the Hungarian-born, American Rebbetzin Esther Jungreis said the following:

Listen carefully, friends, to what I'm telling you. Hashem [the Name], Elokei Yisrael [the God of Israel], created this world that we are living in today in six days.

Every day was a thousand years. This world, as we know it today, cannot last beyond 6,000 years. Right now, we are in the year 5769 (2008-09), which means it's Erev [eve of] Shabbos of the world. By the year 6,000, Mashiach has to be here. He could come much earlier. But by the year 6,000, he has to be here. ... the Vilna Gaon said that the last war, Milchemet [war] Gog uMagog, is going to last only 12 minutes because they are going to have such weapons. ...

We know that the final redemption, the final Geula, it's going to be like when you left Egypt – only one-fifth of our people left Egypt. Four-fifths perished ... during the plague of darkness.

So I'm appealing to every Jew. Every negative prophecy can be changed. We can bring Mashiach today. Right now, we are living in a period called Erev Shabbat.

It's Erev Shabbat, because when Mashiach will come, it will be the day that will be all Shabbat, the seventh day. ...

Let's bring Shabbos early, and let us to bring Shabbos with menucha [ease], with shalom [peace], with simchah [happiness] – Is it possible? Absolutely?! Every negative prophecy can be changed.

== See also ==
- Jewish eschatology
- Messiah in Judaism
- Jesus Christ (Messiah in Christianity)
- Third Temple
- Kabbalistic approaches to the sciences and humanities
- Millennial Day Theory
- Second Coming
