= Loving-kindness =

Loving-kindness may refer to:

- an English translation of Chesed, a Hebrew word
- an English translation of Maitrī, in Buddhism
