= Kabbalistic approaches to the sciences and humanities =

Kabbalists have included contemporary traditionalist Orthodox teachers of Kabbalah, as well as Neo-Kabbalistic and Academic scholars who read Kabbalah in a critical, universalist way.

== Kabbalistic views ==
=== Harmonisation or opposition ===
Traditionalist Kabbalah and its development in Hasidic Judaism often took negative views of secular wisdoms. While some historical Kabbalists were learned in the canon of medieval Jewish philosophy, and occasionally mathematics and sciences, its relationship to medieval Jewish philosophy (built on Ancient Greek science and cosmology) was ambiguous. Kabbalistic dissemination began in the 12th century in order to stem the rationalist influence of Maimonides, in the context of controversies over his teachings. Nonetheless, philosophical terminology from Jewish philosophy, both Neoplatonic and Aristotelian, permeated the systems of Kabbalists, reinterpreted in mystical ways. The Kabbalistic dictum that "Kabbalah begins where philosophy ends" expressed their claim to superior knowledge, but can also be read as an appreciation of the foundations laid by Jewish philosophy. Kabbalaists held they could see further, giving mythological and psychological answers to philosophical questions, but by virtue of benefiting from the shoulders of philosophy. Kabbalists were certainly opposed to a dogmatic rationalism, but mystics such as the systemiser Moses Cordovero (16th century) expressed their influence from, and appreciation for, the profound philosophical purification of Jewish theology from mistaken corporeal interpretations universally established by Maimonides, in Cordovero's dialectical use of imagination to grasp then reject anthropomorphic conceptions in Kabbalah. Judah Loew ben Bezalel (16th century) expressed mystical ideas in the philosophical and scientific terminology of his day, appreciating the natural sciences if subservient to revelation.

Kabbalistic views on secular studies were shaped by both mystical views and social context. Shneur Zalman of Liadi (18th century) expresses the dangers of impure secular wisdoms to common faith, yet also the concealed divinity within them for great sages like the philosophical Maimonides (12th century) and mystical Nachmanides (13th century), who can clarify their unity with Torah, disclosing new esoteric dimensions:

"Occupying oneself with the sciences of the nations of the world is… included in the category of engaging in inconsequential matters insofar as the sin of neglecting the Torah is concerned… Moreover, the impurity of science is greater than the impurity of idle speech… Thus this is forbidden unless one employs [this knowledge] as a useful instrument, viz., as a means of [earning a livelihood] with which to be able to serve God… or unless he knows how to apply them in the service of God or to his better understanding of His Torah [i.e., in the manner of] Maimonides and Nachmanides…"

— Shneur Zalman of Liadi, Tanya: Likutei Amarim, 8

=== Pre-Messianic era ===
Kabbalah (such as Nachmanides' commentary on the Torah) relates the 7 Days of Creation in Genesis chapter 1 to the 7 lower sephirot Divine attributes from Chesed to Malkuth. These comprise the "Revealed World" of Divine emotional expression, contrasted with the first 3 sephirot "Hidden World" of the Divine mind. The Talmud relates the 6 Days when God actively creates to the 6000 years of Creation, in the traditional Jewish calendar, with the 7th day corresponding to the messianic era 1000 years of Sabbath rest.

The Zohar central text of Kabbalah (disseminated 13th-15th centuries CE) commenting on the verse "In the six hundredth year of Noah's life, on the seventeenth day of the second month, on that day all the springs of the great deep burst forth, and the floodgates of the heavens were opened" (Genesis 7:11), relates that in the 600th year (or 600 years-6th century, 500-600) of the 6th millennium, the floodgates of wisdom above and below will open up, to prepare the world for the messianic age:

In the 6th century of the 6th millennium (ie in the years 5,500-5,600 in the Hebrew calendar corresponding to the years 1740-1840 CE) the gates of wisdom from above (Kabbalah) and the fountains of wisdom from below (science, technology, and secular thought) will be opened up and the world will make preparations to enter the 7th millennium just as one makes preparations on the 6th day of the week (Friday) when the sun is about to set (for the 7th day – the Jewish Shabbat).

Within the pre-messianic 6th millennium, leading up to the 6th century individual gates of the "50 gates of wisdom" will open sequentially, but from the year 600 (1840 CE in the secular calendar) all gates will open, enabling the cumulative discovery from then on of the upper and lower wisdoms which will flood the world, preparing it for the revelation of Absolute Divine Unity in the 7th millennium. This will especially take place in the last generation of the messiah, when "even young children will know the secrets of the Torah". This mystical prediction corresponds to the early advent of modernist secular thought from 1740s-1840s on, that broke the conventions, rigidities and limits of early modern thought. Among new ideas since then, some are overtly compatible with traditional Kabbalistic mysticism, some are compatible with extending non-fundamentalist Neo-Kabbalistic views of Revelation, some await deeper clarification of their divine unity with Torah. Among new ideas that overtly lend themselves to unity with Kabbalistic ideas, examples include Hegelian dialectics (early 1800s), Quantum mechanics (early 1900s), Freudian and Jungian depth psychology (early 1900s), postmodern Deconstruction (late 1900s), String theory (late 1900s).

Biological Evolution (developed since the 1860s from the foundations of Darwin and Mendel), while providing the basis of contemporary New Atheism, has been studied as potentially valid "fallen" aspects of Divinity by the traditional Kabbalist Yitzchak Ginsburgh. Atheist views such as Nietzsche's (late 1800s) have been welcomed by the Orthodox mystic Abraham Isaac Kook and Neo-Kabbalist scholar Sanford Drob as a necessary refining dialectical pole in Kabbalah's human-divine Panentheism view of God. The secular documentary criticism of the Torah (1700s on), and feminist criticisms are being discussed in Open Orthodox and Non-Orthodox Judaisms as outlooks that can expand evolving human understanding of Kabbalah's transcendent Mystical Torah.

The prediction of the Zohar states that in (or from) the years 1740-1840 CE (or the year 1840), both the "lower (human) wisdoms" of secular thought and the "higher (divine) wisdoms" of Kabbalah will open. The dissemination of the higher wisdoms today can be found in the contemporary flourishing of Jewish mysticism academia since the mid-20th century, who have catalogued, published and interpreted historical Kabbalistic texts, offering perceptive historical, phenomenological and comparative scholarly new understandings of formerly unpublished and esoteric manuscripts, development of thought, and mystical techniques. This disclosure is ongoing, as is the proliferation of Judaic Kabbalah in Jewish outreach. The source of the divine wisdoms from the era 1740-1840 is attributed among Non-Hasidic Lithuanian Jews to the esoteric messianic Kabbalistic school of the Vilna Gaon (1720-1797) that esoterically prepared the ongoing "Messiah ben Joseph" union of Kabbalah and Science, and the publication of early texts of Kabbalah. Among Hasidic Judaism, the new dimensions of "upper wisdoms" are Hasidic thought, initiated by the Baal Shem Tov from the 1730s and developing its classic schools by the mid-1800s, which related transcendent Kabbalah to the psychological inner divine experience of man. In Chabad intellectual school of Hasidism, Hasidic thought is a new level of Divine revelation above Kabbalah and the concepts and structures of Torah thought. The Pardes 4 levels of Torah interpretation correspond to the Four Worlds and ascending levels of the soul, with Kabbalah corresponding to Atzilut, Divine revelation, Wisdom and the transcendent soul. Hasidic thought corresponds to the Yechida essence of the soul, innermost Divine Delight rooted in the Atzmus Divine Essence, the essence of the Torah, and the messianic essence of the world. As essence permeates and unites all other levels of Torah, so Hasidism finds expression in both Kabbalah and materiality, esoteric and exoteric. By revealing the common Divine Essence within both spiritual and physical, Hasidic thought through its conceptual articulation in Chabad, is a foretaste of the messianic era. In Breslav Hasidism, Nachman of Breslov saw himself as the next revelation of Kabbalah succeeding and encompassing the revelations of Isaac Luria and the Baal Shem Tov. The Lubavitcher Rebbe quotes the midrash that "God looked into the Torah and created the World", saying that it is the new revelations of the divine "upper wisdoms" in this period that cause the "lower wisdoms" of secular thought, science and technology to also be opened.

=== Traditionalist Kabbalah versus Neo-Kabbalah ===
Traditionalist Kabbalah embraces a Mosaic authorship fundamentalist view of Torah revelation, and the revelatory early origins of Jewish mysticism such as the Zohar. While rooting all creation and every individual entity in Absolute Divine origin, traditional Kabbalists also usually held a metaphysical particularist distinction in revealed Divinity between the souls of Jews and gentiles, concealed deep within the different forms of "divine spark" animating each. This view was bolstered in Kabbalist belief by the history of antisemitism until The Holocaust, replaced by antisemitism in Islam since the founding of the State of Israel. Traditionalist Kabbalah and modernist Neo-Kabbalistic adaptions represent two divergent directions in interpreting historical texts from Jewish mysticism. Traditional Kabbalists don't historically recognise the validity of Bible Criticism, or critical adaptions of Kabbalistic ideas to secular ideologies. Nonetheless, contemporary traditional Kabbalists who understand secular thought can see a true Divine element animating what to them are mistaken critical views of Torah.

Neo-Kabbalists, such as Neo-Hasidism, adapt Kabbalah and Hasidism to modern critical thought. They see positive benefit in the development of historical Kabbalah and Judaism to contemporary concerns, while retaining the spirituality of Jewish tradition and observance. They find fundamentalist and particularist notions problematic, welcoming non-fundamentalist views of Revelation in Judaism, and critical scholarship on the Biblical, Talmudic and mystical texts, including a late dating for the Zohar. Associated elements of historical Kabbalah, such as the numerical permutations of Torah text are downplayed, while new expressions and comparisons for Jewish mysticism are explored. They universalise the teachings of Kabbalah, translating Jewish Divine perception expressed through the spirituality of Jewish observance, into a personal existentialist spirituality. For Neo-Kabbalists, the problematic metaphysics differentiating Jews and gentiles dissolves in the antinomian boundaries to limited conceptions of Divinity highlighted in classic Kabbalistic hermeneutical implications of Infinite Divinity, expressed in the Zohar and other texts.

== See also ==
- Torah Umadda
- Jewish views on evolution
- Jewish reactions to intelligent design
- Relationship between religion and science
- Year 6000

== Publications ==
- The Secret Doctrine of the Gaon of Vilna: Mashiach ben Yoseph and the Messianic Role of Torah, Kabbalah and Science (Volume 1), Joel David Bakst, City of Luz 2013
- The Secret Doctrine of the Gaon of Vilna: The Josephic Messiah, Leviathan, Metatron & the Sacred Serpent (Volume 2), Joel David Bakst, City of Luz 2013
- Beyond Kabbalah - The Teachings That Cannot Be Taught: Preparing for the Messianic Era and Beyond, Joel David Bakst, CreateSpace 2014
- The Spiritual Revolution of Rav Kook, Ari Ze'ev Schwartz, Gefen 2018
- Wisdom: Integrating Torah and Science, Yitzchak Ginsburgh and Moshe Genuth, Gal Einai publications 2018
- The Torah Academy, Yitzchak Ginsburgh, Gal Einai publications 1995
- Lectures on Torah and Modern Physics, Yitzchak Ginsburgh, Gal Einai publications 2013
- The Breath of Life: Torah, Intelligent Design and Evolution, Yitzchak Ginsburgh, Gal Einai publications 2018
- Transforming Darkness Into Light: Kabbalah and Psychology, Yitzchak Ginsburgh, Gal Einai publications 2005
- Symbols of the Kabbalah: Philosophical and Psychological Perspectives, Sanford Drob, Aronson 1999
- Kabbalistic Metaphors: Jewish Mystical Themes in Ancient and Modern Thought, Sanford Drob, Aronson 2000
- Kabbalah and Postmodernism: A Dialogue, Sanford Drob, Peter Lang publishers 2008
- Kabbalistic Visions: C.G. Jung and Jewish Mysticism, Sanford Drob, Spring Journal 2009
- The Hidden Freud: His Hassidic Roots, Joseph Berke, Routledge 2018
- Expanding the Palace of Torah: Orthodoxy and Feminism, Tamar Ross, Brandeis 2004
- Kabbalah and Criticism, Harold Bloom, Bloomsbury 2005
- Old Worlds, New Mirrors: On Jewish Mysticism and Twentieth-Century Thought, Moshe Idel, University of Pennsylvania press 2012
