= Tree of life (Kabbalah) =

Diagram used in various mystical traditions

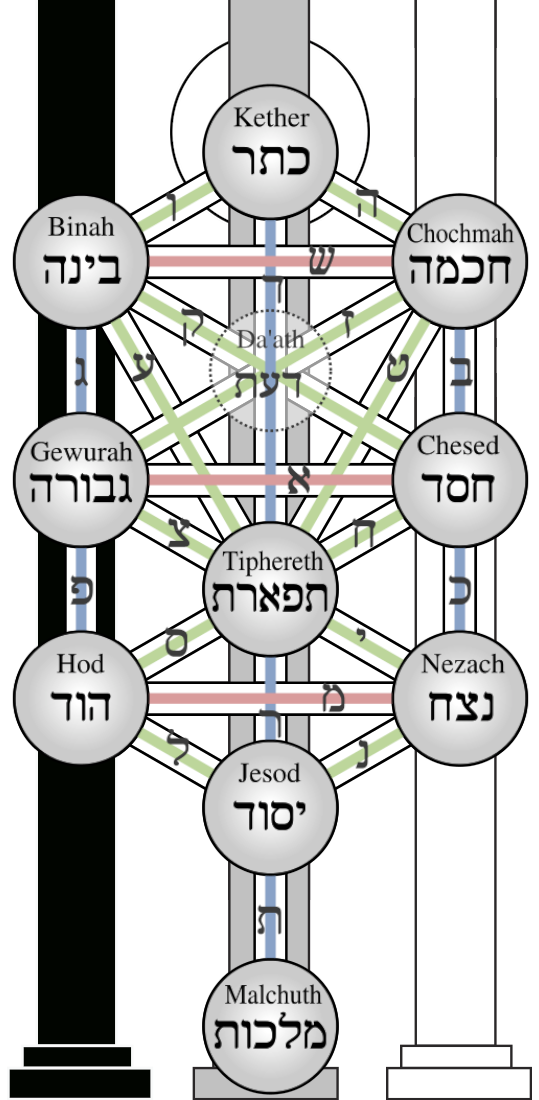
A version of the Kabbalistic tree of life

The Tree of Life (Hebrew: עֵץ חַיִּים, ʿēṣ ḥayyim) is a symbolic diagram used in Jewish mystical traditions, especially in Kabbalah, to describe divine structure, creation, and the spiritual path of ascent. It is usually referred to as the "kabbalistic tree of life" to distinguish it from the tree of life that appears alongside the tree of the knowledge of good and evil in the Genesis creation narrative as well as the archetypal tree of life found in many cultures. It serves as both a conceptual framework and, in later Kabbalistic texts, a schematic diagram linking the sefirot, or divine emanations, to cosmology and human spiritual development.

Simo Parpola asserted that the concept of a tree of life with different spheres encompassing aspects of reality traces its origins back to the Neo-Assyrian Empire in the ninth century BC. The Assyrians assigned moral values and specific numbers to Mesopotamian deities similar to those used in Kabbalah and claims that the state tied these to sacred tree images as a model of the king parallel to the idea of Adam Kadmon. However, J. H. Chajes states that the ilan should be regarded as primarily indebted to the Porphyrian tree and maps of the celestial spheres rather than to any speculative ancient sources, Assyrian or otherwise.

Kabbalah's beginnings date to the Middle Ages, originating in the Bahir and the Zohar. Although the earliest extant Hebrew kabbalistic manuscripts dating to the late 13th century contain diagrams, including one labelled "Tree of Wisdom," the now-iconic tree of life emerged during the fourteenth century.

The iconic representation first appeared in print on the cover of the Latin translation of Gates of Light in the year 1516. Scholars have traced the origin of the art in the Porta Lucis cover to Johann Reuchlin.

== Description ==
The tree of life usually consists of 10 or 11 nodes symbolizing different archetypes and 22 paths connecting the nodes. The nodes are often arranged into three columns to represent that they belong to a common category.

In kabbalah, the nodes are called sefirot. They are usually represented as circles and the paths (Hebrew: צִנּוֹר, romanized: ṣinnoroṯ) are usually represented as lines. The nodes usually represent encompassing aspects of existence, God, or the human psyche. The paths usually represent the relationship between the concepts ascribed to the spheres or a symbolic description of the requirements to go from one sphere to another. The columns are usually symbolized as pillars. These usually represent different kinds of moral values, electric charges, or types of ceremonial magic.

The sefirot are the ten spheres on the Tree of Life. Each sefirah (singular of sefirot) represents a different aspect of the Divine, as well as aspects of human consciousness and existence. These are, from top to bottom:

1. Keter (crown)
2. Hokhmah (wisdom)
3. Binah (intelligence)
4. Hesed (mercy)
5. Gevurah (judgement)
6. Tiferet (beauty)
7. Netsah (lasting endurance, eternity)
8. Hod (majesty)
9. Yesod (foundation of the world)
10. Malkuth (kingdom)

An eleventh sefirah, Da'at (knowledge), appears in some diagrams of the tree halfway between Keter (node 1) and Tiferet (node 6).

The diagram is also used in Christian Kabbalah, Hermetic Qabalah, and Theosophy. The nodes are also associated with deities, angels, celestial bodies, moral values, single colors or combinations of them, and specific numbers.

== History ==
Paolo Riccio's son, Jerome/Hieronymus, actively exchanged letters and shared his father's work with Reuchlin before publication. Thus, in the year 1516, Reuchlin's diagram came to appear on the cover of the Paolo Riccio's Latin translation of Joseph ben Abraham Gikatilla's Gates of Light. The diagram only had 17 paths and, at the time, the concepts of 10 spheres and 22 letters were still distinct in the literature. In 1573, a version sketched by Franciscus Zillettus appeared in Cesare Evoli, De divinis attributis.

This version introduced several innovations that would reappear in later versions: all the spheres were of the same size, the lines became wide paths, the spheres were aligned into 3 distinct columns, Malkuth was connected to three spheres, and astrological symbols for the known celestial bodies were used in conjunction with the Hebrew names to label the spheres. However, it also had only 17 paths, albeit distributed differently. Reuchlin's version was reprinted in Johann Pistorius' compilation of 1587. Finally, several versions from unknown artists introducing 21 and 22 paths appeared in the posthumous print editions of Moses Cordovero's Pardes Rimonim between 1592 and 1609. However, the diagrams with 22 paths lacked consistency with each other and none of them had the 22 letters. Cordovero also provided a verbal description of the paths in Pardes Rimonim, Gate 7, Chapter 1 and in Ohr Ne'erav, part 6, chapter 2. The descriptions are, However, in conflict describing different path arrangements. Pardes Rimonim describes 24 paths, though two from Hod and Netzach to Malkuth are not counted. Ohr Ne'erav describes 22 paths. Between 1652 and 1654, Athanasius Kircher published his version of the tree in Oedipus Aegyptiacus. According to 20th-century occult writer Aleister Crowley, Kircher designed his diagram in a syncretic attempt to reconcile several distinct ideas. This heavily annotated version, self-termed Sefirotic System, introduced more innovations: abstract concepts, divine names, the 22 Hebrew letters for each path, and new astrological symbols.

Between 1677 and 1684, Christian Knorr von Rosenroth published Kabbala denudata. The first volume concluded with an apparatus featuring five ilanot, or kabbalistic trees, representing various aspects of Lurianic cosmology. Four of these were based on ilanot that had been designed by Jewish kabbalists over the preceding half century; one (his figures 8–12) was designed by Knorr based on his reading of select passages of Naftali Hertz ben Yaakov Elchanan's 1648 Emek ha-melekh.

Consequently, according to contemporary students of Western esotericism (rather than to scholars of Jewish Kabbalah), two versions are now widely circulated: one where Malkuth has 1 path, owing to Reuchlin's original; and another where Malkuth has three paths, owing to several later versions; both having 22 paths in total, corresponding each to a Hebrew letter, owing to Kircher's syncretism. With the resurgence of occultism in the 19th century, many new versions appeared, but without major innovations.

== Jewish mystical (Kabbalistic) interpretation ==
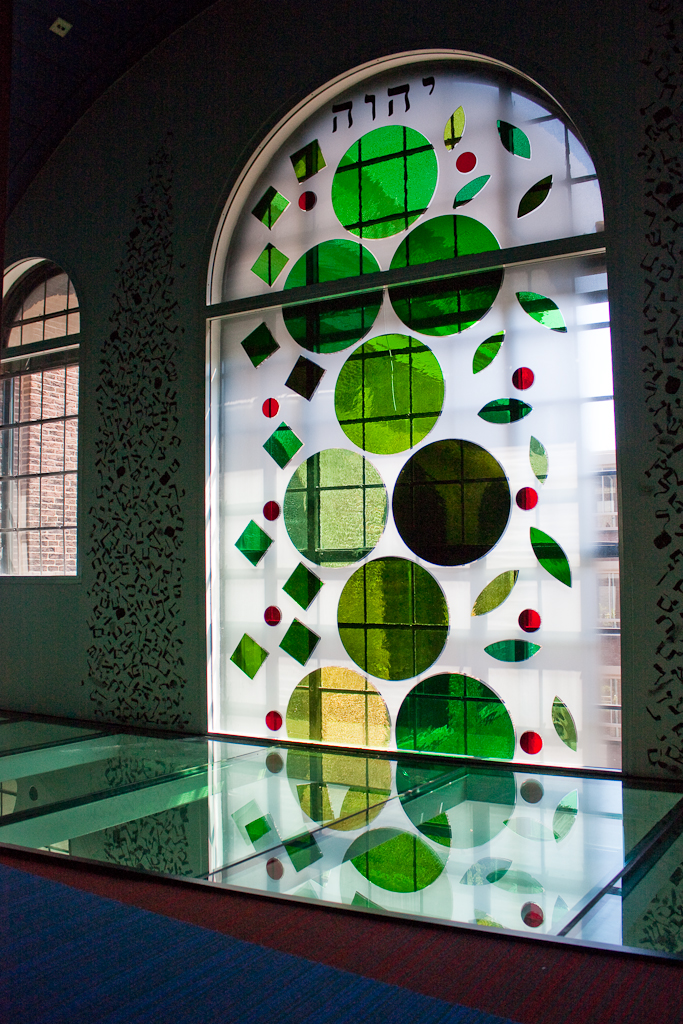
A pattern inspired by the tree of life in a window in the Joods Historisch Museum in Amsterdam

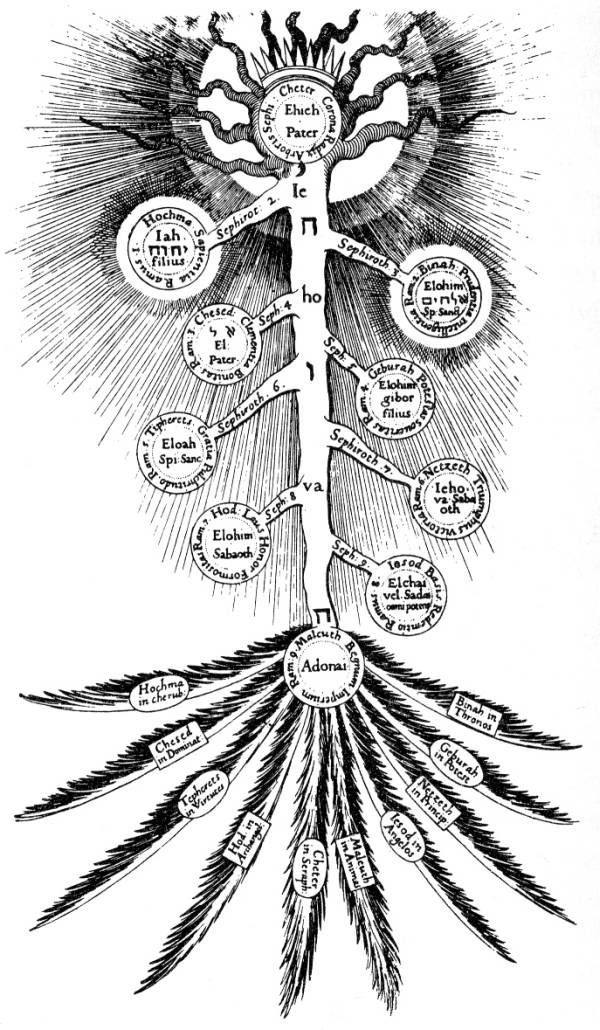
The tree of life based on the depiction by Robert Fludd in the Deutsche Fotothek

Unlike earlier forms of Jewish mysticism centered on visionary ascent and the contemplation of heavenly palaces, medieval Kabbalah developed symbolic models for articulating the inner structure of divine reality itself. Scholars characterize this transition as a movement away from experiential visions of the celestial realm toward a theosophical exploration of God's hidden inner life, understood as inaccessible to direct perception and therefore expressible only through symbolic language.

Concepts later associated with the Tree of Life draw in part on ideas found in Sefer Yetzirah, one of the earliest Jewish mystical texts, which presents creation as structured through sefirot and Hebrew letters functioning as organizing principles of cosmic order. Although Sefer Yetzirah does not describe a fully articulated sefirotic system or a visual schema, it establishes a conceptual framework in which number, language, and divine activity are closely interconnected, providing an abstract, non-visual substrate for later Kabbalistic symbolism.

In Zoharic Kabbalah, divine reality is conceived as possessing an inner, dynamic life that unfolds through processes of emanation and relational tension within the Godhead. This theosophical conception presents God not only as transcendent but also as internally differentiated, with creation and revelation understood as expressions of this concealed divine vitality. Within this context, the sefirot function as symbolic expressions of divine activity—fluid, relational, and poetic—emphasizing interdependence and dynamism rather than a fixed spatial order or diagrammatic regularity.

Scholarly analysis indicates that early Kabbalistic literature employed multiple symbolic configurations of the sefirot, including linear sequences, triadic groupings, and cosmological metaphors drawn from astronomical and anthropomorphic imagery. These configurations served as interpretive tools for explaining processes of emanation and mediation between the infinite divine source and the created world, rather than as standardized visual schemata. Only in later medieval traditions were efforts made to consolidate these symbolic relationships into more stable schematic representations, retrospectively organizing earlier theosophical material into diagrammatic forms associated with the Tree of Life.

In Chabad Hasidic interpretations of Kabbalah, the Tree of Life is presented as a comprehensive conceptual model integrating cosmology, anthropology, and spiritual practice. The sefirot are understood as stages in the progressive revelation of divine energy from Ein Sof, extending conceptually beyond Keter as Ohr Ein Sof (“infinite light”) and culminating in Malkuth, associated with the material world. This schematic descent of divine emanation is paired with an emphasized reciprocal ascent, in which human consciousness and ethical refinement are understood as a return toward the divine source.

== Anthroposophical explanation ==
In his lectures for workers in Dornach, 1924, Rudolf Steiner explained the Tree of Life and its sephira from wider point of view, taking in consideration both the tradition and the ancient knowledge.

In this Sephiroth tree, the Jews of antiquity actually enclosed their highest wisdom. And one could say: they enclosed in it the wisdom of the relationship between man and the world. We have often emphasized that the human being does not only consist of the visible parts that can be seen with the eye, but that the human being also consists of invisible, supersensible members. We have called these supersensible members the etheric body, the astral body, the ego or the ego organization. Now, all these things were known in ancient times, not in the way we have today, but people knew about them instinctively. This ancient knowledge has been completely lost. And today we believe that something like this Jewish Tree of Life, the Sephiroth Tree, is actually a fantasy. But it is not.

Steiner explained that these sephira were forces working upon man from cosmos or from Earth, and even gave descriptive words which can remotely explain what ancient Jews ment by these sephira.

Now let us try to understand what the ancient Jews actually meant by this Sephiroth tree. They thought of it like this: Man stands there in the world, but the forces of the world act on him from all sides. First of all, three forces act on the human head, (...) three forces on the human center, on the chest, on breathing and blood circulation mainly, (...) then three more forces act on the limbs of the human being, (...) and a tenth force, which acts on the human being from the earth.

=== These are the terms with which Rudolf Steiner explained the sephira. ===
So the human head, everything that actually belongs to the sensory system in the human being, and also the nerves that are spread out in the sensory system, all this was designated by the three terms Kether, Chokmah, Binah - crown, wisdom, intelligence.

- Keter: Crown
- Chokmah: Wisdom
- Binah: Intelligence

Now, there are three other forces; these have more of an effect on the middle person, on the person in whom the heart is, in whom the lungs are. So they have an effect on the middle person; they come down less from above, they live more in the environment. They live in the sunshine that moves around on the earth, they live in wind and weather. The three forces that the ancient Jews mentioned come into consideration here: chesed, geburah, tiphereth.

- Chesed (Gedulah): Freedom
- Geburah: Strength, Vitality, Life force
- Tipharet: Beauty

Next three forces, which have to do with human astral body.

- Netsah: overcoming
- Hod: compassion
- Yesod: Foundation
  Netsah, and that means that one overcomes the firmness of the earth, that one moves (...) The ancient Jews called Hod that which brings about reproduction in humans, which is therefore connected with sexuality, today we would describe it with a word that would express something like compassion. (...)
- Malkuth: Field

== See also ==
- Atziluth
- Boaz and Jachin
- Flower of life
- Qlippoth
