= Clean language =

Questioning technique

Clean language is a technique originally used in counseling, psychotherapy and coaching but now also used in education, business, organisational change and health. It has been applied as a research interview technique called clean language interviewing.

Clean language aims to support clients in discovering and developing their own symbols and metaphors, rather than the therapist/coach/interviewer suggesting or contributing their own framing of a topic. In other words, instead of "supporting" the client by offering them ready-made metaphors, when the counselor senses that a metaphor would be useful or that a metaphor is conspicuously absent, the counselor asks the client, "And that's like what?" The client is invited to invent their own metaphor.

Clean language was devised by David J. Grove in the 1980s as a result of his work on clinical methods for resolving clients' traumatic memories. Psychotherapist Cei Davies Linn was closely involved in the early evolution and development of Grove's work such as Clean Language and Epistemological Metaphors. Grove realized many clients were describing their symptoms in metaphors drawn from the words of previous therapists, instead of from their own experience.

Clean language also is the basis for symbolic modeling, a stand-alone method and process for psychotherapy and coaching developed by James Lawley and Penny Tompkins; for clean space; and for systemic modelling, applied in organisational development. Clean language can also be used in addition to a therapist or coach's existing approach.

== David Grove ==
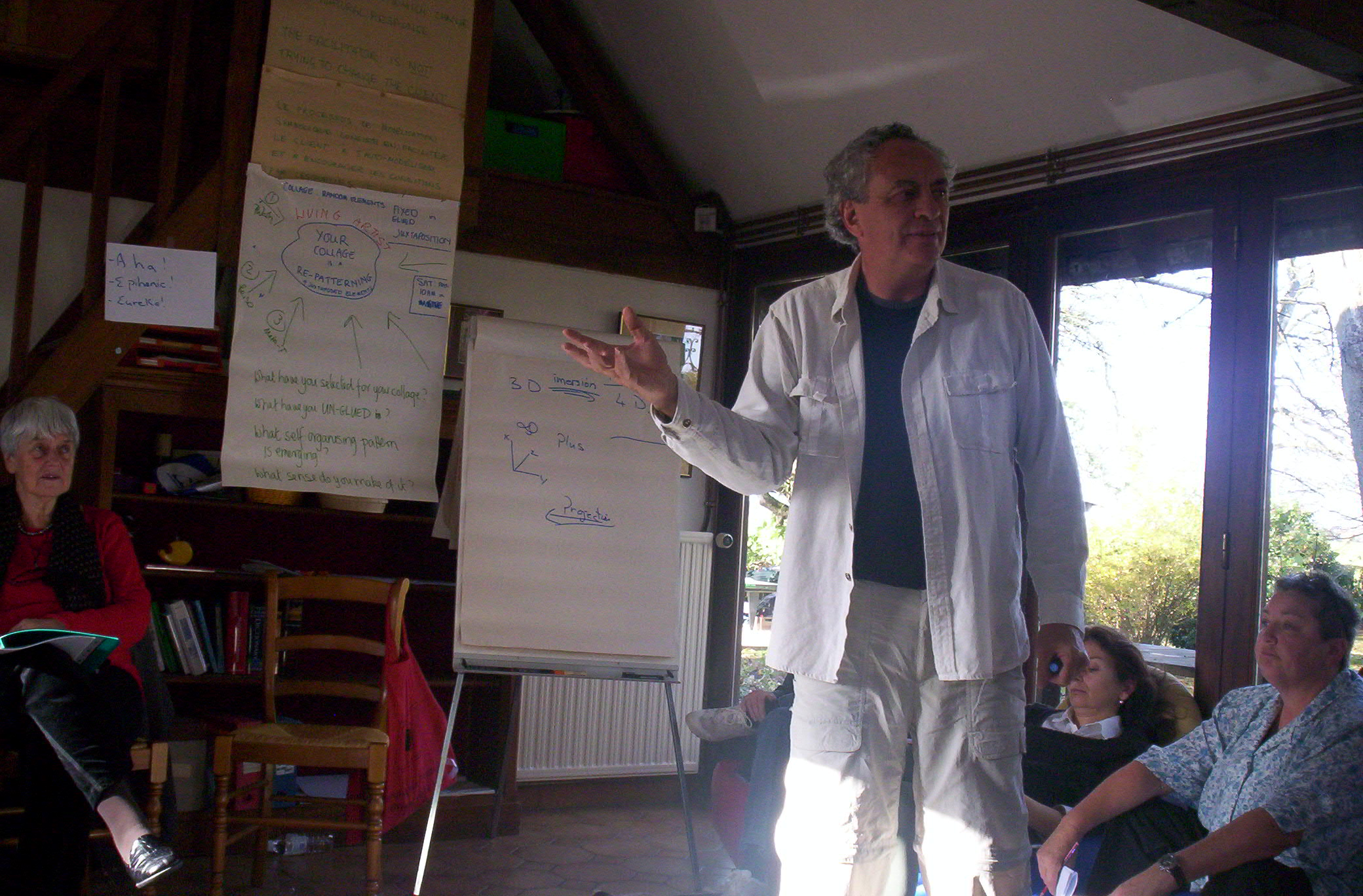
David Grove, Emergent Knowledge Retreat, France, 2007

Clean language originated with New Zealand-born and educated David Grove, who drew on his bi-cultural Māori/British roots when designing therapeutic and coaching methods. Grove had degrees from University of Canterbury and University of Otago in New Zealand, and a masters in counselling psychology at Minnesota State University Moorhead. Grove served as a consulting psychologist with the London Phobic Trust, and published a book with Basil Panzer, Resolving Traumatic Memories: Metaphors and Symbols in Psychotherapy (1989/1991). He died on 8 January 2008.

Grove's clean language was initially designed to address the needs of patients who were suffering from traumatic memories, particularly to facilitate in their capability to resolve blocks and phobias. This is achieved through the description of subjective experiences and identifying specific phrases, which are then made less abstract to elicit the link between speech and lived experience. Grove's work on clean language also spawned the field of "emergent knowledge".

== Clean language in detail ==
Prior to the use of the term "clean language" David taught and practiced his methods in the context of healing complex trauma. In the following years his workshop materials included such titles as "Metaphors to Heal by", "Resolving Traumatic Memories", "Healing the Wounded Child Within" and "In the Presence of the Past".

Clean language combines four elements of communication: syntax, wording of questions, vocal qualities, and non-verbal behaviour.

=== Syntax ===
In a therapeutic context, clean language questions often make use of the "full 3-part syntax" which has the format:

And [client's words/non-verbals] ... and when/as [client's words/ non-verbals] ... [clean question]?

This structure is derived from Grove's early hypnotic work, and is designed to direct attention, minimize cognitive load, and make it easier for the client to remain in the inner-directed state that the questions generate. Outside the therapeutic context, a more "everyday" syntax tends to be used.

=== Wording of questions ===
Clean language questions seek to minimise content that comes from the questioner's "maps" — metaphors, assumptions, paradigms or sensations — that could direct the questionee's attention away from increased awareness of his or her own (metaphorical) representation of experience thereby "diminishing their epistemological nature".

Clean language offers a template for questions that are as free as possible of the facilitator's suggestions, presuppositions, mind-reading, second guessing, references and metaphors. Clean questions incorporate all or some of the client's specific phrasing and might also include other auditory components of the client's communication such as speed, pitch, tonality. Besides the words of the client, oral sounds (sighs, oo's and ah's) and other nonverbals (e.g. a fist being raised or a line-of-sight) can be replicated or referenced in a question when the facilitator considers they might be of symbolic significance to the client.

Clean language facilitators do not follow popular generalised assumptions about the meaning of 'body language' (e.g. assuming that crossed arms mean the person is 'closed'), preferring to ask about the meaning such behaviour has for the client. The assumption being that much 'body language' is an unconscious communication with self.

=== Vocal qualities ===
Voice speed, tone and volume can all affect the kind of attention the client pays to their own experience. Where the client's words are used, the vocal qualities of the client's words are repeated. In therapeutic applications, the questioner's words are often given slower, with a rhythmic and poetic tonality. In everyday interactions the facilitator can remain closer to their usual tonality.

=== Non-verbal behaviour ===
Non-verbal behaviour is the way someone expresses themselves in addition to spoken word. These include gestures, posture, head- and eye-points, and other movements of the body. The facilitator minimises their own non-verbal behaviour and does not mirror the movements of the client's body. Rather the facilitator uses gestures and eye-points that are congruent with the location of the client's imaginative symbols from the client's perspective.

== Clean language principles ==
A person is 'being clean' when they:

- Preserve others' experience precisely as they express it (including metaphors and non-verbals);
- Refrain from introducing concepts, metaphors, judgements, evaluations or assumptions;
- Invite others to attend to their experience without intending to change it;
- Only introduce words that do not suggest new content.

== Example ==
Clean language questions are designed to reduce to a minimum any influence from the facilitator's "map of the world" via his or her metaphors, interpretations or unwarranted assumptions. They are also designed to direct the client's attention to some aspect of their experience (as expressed in their words or non-verbal expressions) that the facilitator has noticed and chooses to highlight for the client's potential learning. An example dialog is as follows:

Client: "I feel strange."

Non-clean language facilitator responses might include:
- "I know this can be uncomfortable."
- "Are you ill?"
- "Do you want to feel normal?"
- "What would happen if you didn't?"
- "Stop complaining!"

Clean language facilitator responses might include:
- "And where do you feel strange?"
- "And what kind of strange?"
- "And that's strange like what?"
- "And is there anything else about that 'feels strange'?"
- "And what happens just before you feel strange?"
- "And when you feel strange, what would you like to have happen?"

While there are between 8 and 12 basic clean language questions that David Grove used about 80% of the time, the concept of being 'clean' resides not only in the questions themselves but also in the intention of the facilitator.

== Self-coaching exercise ==
A life coach suggested the following clean language self-coaching exercise: Write down the clean language questions on strips of paper, fold these or arrange them randomly on a table face down. Then decide on a problem or a goal you would like to work on by answering the question: "What would you like to have happen?" Take one paper at a time with a clean language question written on it. After answering the question, draw another piece of paper and continue with the process until the strips of paper run out.

== Research methodology ==
Clean language has been used to enhance the authenticity and rigour of interview-based qualitative research. One application is as a method for eliciting naturally occurring metaphors in order to provide in-depth understanding of a person's symbolic worldview.

Research projects have used clean language interviewing: for example, exploring the subjectivity of coachees' experience and outcomes; comparing the evidence of coach competency from three perspectives; and investigating tacit and explicit knowledge acquisition among student teachers.

David Grove researched with the help of Pam Saunders, new perspectives of clean language by using mathematical models such as chaos theory, fractal geometry and some physics principles such as location and momentum and developing a mechanical device to use movement with the aim of accessing deeper mind structures.

== See also ==
- Clean language interviewing – an interviewing technique developed from clean language
- Focusing (psychotherapy)
- Open-ended question
- Reflective listening

=== Non-clean language ===
- Advice (opinion)
- Criticism
- Imperative mood
- Leading question
- Loaded question
- Suggestive question
