= Millennial Day Theory =

Christian eschatological theory

The Millennial day theory, the Millennium sabbath hypothesis, or the Sabbath millennium theory, is a theory in Christian eschatology in which the Second Coming of Christ will occur 6,000 years after the creation of mankind, followed by 1,000 years of peace and harmony. It is a very popular belief accepted by certain premillennialists who usually promote young Earth creationism.

The view takes the stance that each millennium is actually a day according to God (as found in Psalm 90:4 and 2 Peter 3:8), and that eventually at the end of the 6,000 years since the creation, Jesus will return. It teaches that the 7th millennium is actually called the Sabbath Millennium (in parallel to the Genesis account of the 6 days of creation followed by the Sabbath day of rest); in the Sabbath Millennium Jesus will ultimately set up his perfect kingdom and allow his followers to rest. The Sabbath Millennium is believed to be synonymous with the Millennial Reign of Christ as depicted in Revelation 20:1-6.

== Proponents ==
Early church premillennialism may be rooted in prior orthodox Jewish thought. Early premillennialists included Pseudo-Barnabas, Papias, Methodius, Lactantius, Commodianus Theophilus, Tertullian, Melito, Hippolytus of Rome, Victorinus of Pettau, as well as various Gnostic groups and the Montanists. Many of these theologians and others in the early church expressed their belief in premillennialism through their acceptance of this sexta-septamillennial tradition. This belief claims that human history will continue for 6,000 years and then will enjoy Sabbath for 1,000 years (the millennial kingdom), thus all of human history will have a total of 7,000 years prior to the new creation. Christians throughout history have often considered that some thousand-year Sabbath, expected to begin six thousand years after Creation, might be identical with the millennium described in the Book of Revelation. This view was also popular among 19th- and 20th-century dispensational premillennialists. The term "Sabbatism" or "Sabbatizing" (Greek Sabbatismos), which generically means any literal or spiritual Sabbath-keeping, has also been taken in the Epistle to the Hebrews (Hebrews 4:9) to have special reference to this definition.

== Support for the theory ==
The main support for this view is found in the passages regarding the original Sabbath system that the Judeo-Christian-God instituted, while also taking the verses of Psalms 90:4 and 2 Peter 3:8 into consideration. According to the proponents of the theory, Book of Hosea 6:1-2 demonstrates that after two days, the Lord will revive Israel, and on the third day, restore her and live with her forever. According to these Christians, Jesus has indeed been gone for two millennia. He was crucified during a time of severe Roman oppression that was directed towards Israel, which eventually caused the dispersion of Israel in the 1st century AD. Counting the first two days as two millenniums, and the third day as the Millennium in which Christ reigns on Earth may invariably lead to the conclusion that Jesus will return soon - most likely within the 21st century. It is this perception of Bible prophecy that provides the motivation to create a theory that is rooted in absolute Biblical literalism and is entirely based on Premillennialism.

Additional support for the theory can be found in the Apocrypha. The Book of Jubilees records the end of the life of Adam in chapter four. Jubilees 4:29-30 "And at the close of the nineteenth jubilee, in the seventh week in the sixth year [930 A.M.] thereof, Adam died, and all his sons buried him in the land of his creation, and he was the first to be buried in the earth. And he lacked seventy years of one thousand years; for one thousand years are as one day in the testimony of the heavens and therefore was it written concerning the tree of knowledge: 'On the day that ye eat thereof ye shall die.' For this reason he did not complete the years of this day; for he died during it." This theory has led some Christians to make a connection between the "Day of the Lord," the "Last Day," the "Sabbath," and the 1000-year reign of Christ, seeing them as synonyms. However, this interpretation is not widely held at this time.

== See also ==
- Second coming
- Dispensationalism
- Premillennialism
- Year 6000
