= Chesed (Kabbalah) =

Fourth emanation in Kabbalah

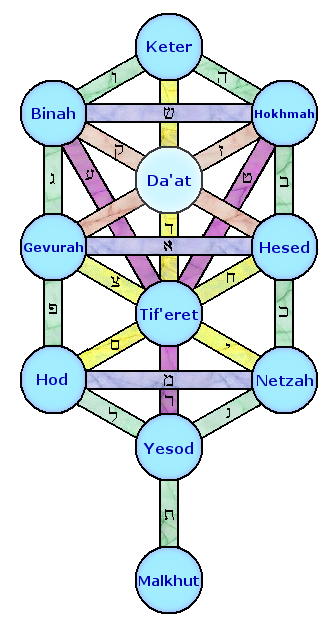
The Sefirot in Kabbalah
The Sefiroth in Jewish Kabbalah
| View the image description page for this diagram | The Tree of Life |

Chesed (Hebrew: חֶסֶד, also Romanized: Ḥeseḏ) is one of the ten sefirot on the kabbalistic Tree of Life. It is given the association of kindness and love, and is the first of the emotive attributes of the sephirot.

== Etymology and names ==
The Hebrew noun chesed (חסד) is typically translated as "loving-kindness", "mercy", or "grace". It appears frequently in the Hebrew Bible, denoting acts of kindness and compassion. The term Chesed is derived from the Hebrew root ח-ס-ד, which conveys the idea of loyal love or steadfast kindness. This root is used in various forms in the Hebrew Bible to describe the relationship between God and humanity, as well as the relationships among individuals. Chesed implies a sense of mutual obligation and care, extending beyond mere kindness to encompass loyalty and faithfulness.

A person who embodies chesed is known as a chasid (hasid, חסיד), one who is faithful to the covenant and who goes "above and beyond that which is normally required" and a number of groups throughout Jewish history which focus on going "above and beyond" have called themselves chasidim. These groups include the Hasideans of the Second Temple period, the Maimonidean Hasidim of medieval Egypt and Palestine, the Chassidei Ashkenaz in medieval Europe, and the Hasidic movement which emerged in eighteenth century Eastern Europe.

== History ==
The development of Chesed as a sefirah began in medieval Kabbalistic writings, particularly those of Isaac the Blind and the Gerona circle in 12th and 13th century Provence. Their writings helped establish Chesed as part of the developing sefirotic system in medieval Kabbalah. The Zohar, a foundational Kabbalistic text from the 13th century, elaborates on Chesed as the right arm of God, representing the extension of divine mercy into the world.

In the 16th century, Moses ben Jacob Cordovero and Isaac Luria significantly advanced the understanding of Chesed. Cordovero's Pardes Rimonim framed Chesed within a systematic Kabbalistic structure, while Luria's teachings, compiled in texts like Etz Chaim, emphasized its role in the cosmic process of Tikkun (rectification).

The 18th-century Hasidic movement, led by figures such as the Baal Shem Tov, further emphasized Chesed, advocating for acts of kindness and compassion as essential spiritual practices. Hasidic teaching associated acts of kindness with religious devotion and everyday spiritual practice.

Chesed is discussed in both Kabbalistic literature and Jewish ethical writing as an attribute associated with love, mercy, and benevolence.

== Description ==
On the Tree of Life, Chesed sits on the right side, opposite Gevurah, and is part of the emotional attributes. Chesed is usually understood as boundless kindness. It is the way divine compassion shows up in the world. The Bahir states,

What is the fourth (utterance): The fourth is the righteousness of God, His mercies and kindness with the entire world. This is the right hand of God.

The first three of the ten sephirot are the attributes of the intellect, while chesed is the first sephira of the attribute of action. In the kabbalistic Tree of life, its position is below Chokmah, across from Gevurah and above Netzach. It is usually given four paths: to chokmah, gevurah, tiphereth, and netzach (some Kabbalists place a path from chesed to binah as well.)

Moses ben Jacob Cordovero describes Chesed as God’s limitless kindness, given freely without restraint.

== Qualities ==
=== Ethical behaviour ===
Cordovero says you can practice Chesed through actions like:

- love God so completely that one will never forsake his service for any reason
- take care of a child’s needs and show them love
- circumcise a child
- visiting and healing the sick
- giving charity to the poor
- offering hospitality to strangers
- attending to the dead
- bringing a bride to the chuppah marriage ceremony
- making peace between a person and another human being.

== Textual references ==
=== In the Hebrew Bible ===
The word chesed appears 248 times in the Hebrew Bible. In the majority of cases (149 times), the King James Bible (KJV) translation is mercy, following the Septuagint (LXX) eleos. Less frequent translations are: kindness (40 times), lovingkindness (30 times), goodness (12 times), kindly (five times), merciful (four times), favour (three times) and good, goodliness, pity (once each). Only two instances of the noun in its negative sense are in the text, translated reproach in Proverbs 14:34, and wicked thing in Leviticus 20:17.

=== In the Cloverdale Bible ===
The translation of loving kindness in KJV is derived from the Coverdale Bible of 1535. This particular translation exclusively uses chesed to refer to the benign attitude of YHWH ("the LORD") or Elohim ("God") towards his chosen, primarily invoked in Psalms (23 times), but also in the prophets, four times in Jeremiah, twice in Isaiah 63:7 and once in Hosea 2:19. While lovingkindness is now considered somewhat archaic, it is part of the traditional rendition of Psalms in English Bible translations.

== In Western esotericism ==
In Western esotericism, Chesed is the fourth sephirah on the Tree of Life in Kabbalah. Positioned on the Pillar of Mercy, Chesed lies directly below Chokmah and is associated with attributes of benevolence, expansion, and kindness. In Western esotericism, Chesed is associated with mercy, benevolence, expansion, and loving-kindness.

Chesed signifies compassion, mercy, and the unconditional love of the divine. Esoteric writers also associate Chesed with growth, abundance, expansion, and the image of a benevolent ruler.This sephirah is linked to the planet Jupiter, reflecting qualities of generosity and authority.

The God-name associated with Chesed is El, which signifies might and power in a benevolent context. The Archangel Tzadkiel (or Zadkiel) oversees Chesed, embodying the mercy and benevolence that this sephirah represents. The angelic order of this sphere is the Hashmallim. The opposing qlippah is represented by the demonic order Gamchicoth (or Gha'agsheblah).

In terms of virtues and vices, Chesed's virtue is obedience, reflecting alignment with divine will through acts of kindness. Its vice is bigotry or hypocrisy, indicating the perversion of kindness into favoritism or unjust discrimination.

Chesed is often depicted in blue, symbolizing serenity and expansiveness. Its symbols include the wand, representing authority and power, and the tetrahedron, denoting stability and structure. In practical Kabbalistic work, Chesed can be invoked to bring about healing, generosity, and harmonious expansion. Meditative practices focusing on Chesed aim to open the heart to divine mercy and develop the capacity for kindness and magnanimity.

== See also ==
- Agape (Greek, Christianity)
- Divine love
- Hasid
- Hermetic Qabalah
- Ishq (Arabic, Islam)
- Jewish views on love
- Mettā (Pali, Buddhism)
