= Clean language interviewing =

Research interview technique

Clean language interviewing (CLI), sometimes shortened to clean interviewing, aims to maximise the reliability that information collected during an interview derives from the interviewee. CLI seeks to address some of the "threats to validity and reliability" that can occur during an interview and to increase the "trustworthiness" of the data collected. It does this by employing a technique that minimises the unintended introduction of interviewer content, assumption, leading question structure, presupposition, framing, priming, tacit metaphor and nonverbal aspects such as paralanguage and gesture that may compromise the authenticity of the data collected.

At the same time clean language interviewing seeks to minimise common interviewee biases, such as the consistency effect, acquiescence bias and the friendliness effect which may mean an interviewee (unconsciously) looks for cues from the interviewer about how to answer.

Furthermore, a systematic application of a 'cleanness rating' protocol provides a quantitive measure of adherence to interview guidelines and by extension the "confirmability" of the data collected.

CLI can be considered a phenomenologically-based interview method, similar in intent to neuro- and micro-phenomenology, psycho-phenomenology, phenomenography, and Interpersonal Process Recall. Clean interviewing can be seen as a method of operationalising the phenomenological aim of bracketing (epoché).

CLI has the flexibility to be applied at four progressive levels of practice and principles:
A questioning technique
A method of eliciting interviewee-generated metaphors
A method of studying how people do things
A coherent research strategy based on 'clean' principles.

CLI is also an integral part of a new action research methodology, Modelling Shared Reality which suggests that by paying careful attention to the language they use, qualitative researchers can reduce undesired influence and unintended bias during all stages of research—design, data gathering, analysis and reporting.

== History ==
Clean interviewing derived from clean language, the language model of therapeutic processes devised by David Grove which has since found application in education, business, organisational change, health and academic research.

Grove devised the principles of clean language in the 1980s and continued to develop a specific question set until his death in 2008. Although Owen first suggested applying clean language to phenomenological research in 1996, it was not until 2010 that the first systematic research into the veracity of the method was conducted and published in the British Journal of Management.

Another milestone is the publication of Clean Language Interviewing: Principles and Applications for Researchers and Practitioners. It consists of four chapters introducing the method and eleven chapters detailing the application of CLI to fields such as: journalism in Malaysia; the experience of autistic job applicants in the UK; parents of children diagnosed with encephalopathy in France; modelling an excellent case manager of autistic offenders in the UK; conflict resolution with gang leaders in Haiti; management systems auditing in Japan; serious injury or fatality investigations in the US, among others.

== Features ==
The features of clean interviewing include: the specificity of the technique; minimising unintended influence; data collection from the perspective of the interviewee; its applicability to in-depth interviews; elicitation of autogenic metaphors; investigating tacit knowledge; modelling mental models; and the verifiability of the adherence to the method.

CLI seeks to address the issues raised by research that demonstrates responses can materially be affected by: question construction; framing; changing a single word; introduced metaphors; presupposition; and the nonverbal behaviour of the interviewer such as paralanguage and gesture. Furthermore, in these studies, not only did the subjects show little or no awareness of being subtly and systematically influenced, many reported their answers with a high degree of confidence.

The amount of training required to become a proficient interviewer is commonly underestimated and because of the rigour of the CLI technique, training and practice are required to become a competent clean language interviewer.

== Cleanness rating ==
Roulston maintains "researchers must demonstrate the quality of their work in ways that are commensurate with their assumptions about their use of interviews" yet systematic methods for assessing the reliability and validity of the data collected during an interview are noticeably absent from published research.

A "cleanness rating" can be used to measure the proportion of 'clean' to 'leading' interviewer interventions and hence the authenticity or trustworthiness of the data collected (i.e. how much is sourced in the interviewee's lexicon and logic). "The principal benefit of the rating is to enhance reflexivity" and contribute to "methodological transparency by enabling researchers to report on confirmability".

The rating was created in 2011 and subsequently extended and formalised. An independent examination of interview transcripts allocates one of six categories (Classically clean; Clean repeat; Contextually clean; Mildly leading; Strongly leading; Other) to every question or statement made by the interviewer. The tabulated results are used to arrive at a summary assessment for each interview.

Interviewers experienced in CLI can consistently achieve over 85% of 'clean' interventions. Whereas as many as two-thirds of the questions asked by an untrained interviewer may be 'leading'. An inter-rater reliability analysis of 19 interviews from five research studies demonstrated substantial agreement among raters with an average intraclass correlation coefficient of 0.72 (95% CI).

== Critique ==
The assumption that interviewers can minimise their influence on the collection of data has been questioned for several decades and the social constructivist school claims all knowledge is co-constructed. Practitioners of CLI do not claim it does not influence nor that it is "non-directive". They acknowledge that the interviewer's role is to set the overall purpose and direct the general flow of the interview and they emphasise that all questions, including clean questions, set frames, contain presuppositions and invite the interviewee to attend to certain aspects of his or her experience. Clean questions aim to stay within the lexicon and inherent logic expressed by the interviewee and leave them maximally free to answer from within his or her frames of reference. Tosey maintains that, "accounts are co-constructed through the process of selecting and asking questions. At the same time, Clean Language [Interviewing] aims to minimise the co-construction of the content."

In inexperienced hands the questions may "feel scripted, mechanical and inappropriately therapeutic" and the "guidelines may be quite hard to follow, and rub up against a tension between sustaining neutrality and developing rapport" yet still "invite interviewees to talk about their inner world in their own way which could ideally create openness".

As yet there has been no comprehensive test of the premise that interviews with a high cleanness rating result in higher quality data. Rather, an interview with a low cleanness rating may raise questions about compliance with research protocols and doubts about the authorship of the data collected.

Other forms of interviewing would be more appropriate where the researcher intentionally aims for the 'co-construction of meaning' or to challenge and change the understandings of participants, as in 'transformative interviews'.

Some critics have maintained that the metaphor 'clean' is pejorative to other methods. Grove settled on the metaphor after discovering how others – including Carl Rogers the originator of "non-directive therapy" – (unwittingly) 'contaminate' another person's perceptions with introduced content and presupposition

== Applications ==
While clean interviewing is ideally suited to research, it has also been used by police interviewers, critical incident investigators and in commercial projects such as requirements gathering, market research and organisational change. There is scope for it to be applied in fields such as cognitive task analysis and Naturalistic decision-making.

Examples of published research include:

- Tacit and explicit knowledge acquisition among student teachers in Czech Republic.
- Comparison of the evidence of coach competency from three perspectives.
- Elicitation of 30 European business leaders' metaphors and mental models of leadership and its development.
- Coachees' experience and outcomes from a single coaching session.
- Managers' metaphors of work-life balance.
- A Dutch case study into the role of knowledge in greening flood protection.
- Iranian students' metaphors for their teachers.
- A mid-term review of the Dutch Living with Water project.
- Professional development planning at a UK university.
- Legacy of war experiences of members of the Ulster Defence Regiment.
- An investigation into how midwifery students approach sensitive decisions of pregnant women in The Netherlands.
- A linguistic study of the (inter)subjectivity in people with a schizophrenia diagnosis.
- An Interpretative Phenomenological Analysis of looking up at the sky.
- An exploration of the sea's positive effect on wellbeing.

In addition clean interviewing has been used in a range of PhD research topics:

- Modelling curriculum design in higher education.
- A phenomenological multi-case study exploring the transformative potential of coaching conversations.
- Ways in which pervasive media can contribute to a multimodal holistic user experience of the ambulant landscape.
- Factors that influence employment choices amongst older employees in Denmark.
- An exploration of leadership and its development through the inner worlds of leaders using metaphor.
- A model of spiritual leadership and self-development in a Spiritual Order in Malaysia.
- How older workers in the fire and rescue service deal with work-life balance issues as they approach retirement.
- Whether senior partners in legal services firms possess the core characteristics of identity to work in alignment within the firm.

== See also ==
- Eyewitness memory
- Misinformation effect
