= Chesed =

Hebrew word referring to love or kindness

Chesed (Hebrew: חֶסֶד, also Romanized: Ḥeseḏ) is a Hebrew word that means 'kindness or love between people', specifically of the devotional piety of people towards God as well as of love or mercy of God towards humanity. It is frequently used in Psalms in the latter sense, where it is traditionally translated as "loving kindness" in English translations.

In Jewish theology it is likewise used of God's love for the Children of Israel, and in Jewish ethics it is used for love or charity between people. Chesed in this latter sense of 'charity' is considered a virtue on its own, and also for its contribution to tikkun olam (repairing the world). It is also considered the foundation of many religious commandments practiced by traditional Jews, especially interpersonal commandments.

Chesed is also one of the ten Sephirot on the kabbalistic Tree of Life. It is given the association of kindness and love, and is the first of the emotive attributes of the sephirot.

== Etymology and translations ==
The root chasad has a primary meaning of 'eager and ardent desire', used both in the sense 'good, kind' and 'shame, contempt'. The noun chesed inherits both senses, on one hand 'zeal, love, kindness towards someone' and on the other 'zeal, ardour against someone; envy, reproach'. In its positive sense it is used to describe mutual benevolence, mercy or pity between people, devotional piety of people towards God, as well as the grace, favour or mercy of God towards people.

It occurs 248 times in the Hebrew Bible. In the majority of cases (149 times), the King James Bible (KJV) translation is mercy, following the Septuagint (LXX) eleos. Less frequent translations are: kindness (40 times), lovingkindness (30 times), goodness (12 times), kindly (five times), merciful (four times), favour (three times) and good, goodliness, pity (once each). Only two instances of the noun in its negative sense are in the text, translated reproach in Proverbs 14:34, and wicked thing in Leviticus 20:17.

The translation of loving kindness in KJV is derived from the Coverdale Bible of 1535. This particular translation is used exclusively of chesed used of the benign attitude of YHWH ("the LORD") or Elohim ("God") towards his chosen, primarily invoked in Psalms (23 times), but also in the prophets, four times in Jeremiah, twice in Isaiah 63:7 and once in Hosea 2:19. While lovingkindness is now considered somewhat archaic, it is part of the traditional rendition of Psalms in English Bible translations. Some more recent translations use steadfast love where KJV has lovingkindness.

The Septuagint has mega eleos 'great mercy', rendered as Latin misericordia. An example of the use of chesed in Psalms occurs at the beginning of Psalm 51 (חָנֵּנִי אֱלֹהִים כְּחַסְדֶּךָ, lit. 'be favourable to me, Elohim, as your chesed'):

ἐλέησόν με ὁ θεός κατὰ τὸ μέγα ἔλεός σου (LXX)
Miserere mei, Deus, secundum misericordiam tuam (Vulgate)
"God, haue thou merci on me; bi thi greet merci." (Wycliffe 1388)
"Haue mercy vpon me (o God) after thy goodnes" (Coverdale Bible 1535)
"Haue mercie vpon mee, O God, according to thy louing kindnesse" (KJV 1611)
"Have mercy upon me, O God, according to thy lovingkindness" (KJV 1769, RV 1885, ASV 1901)
"Favour me, O God, according to Thy kindness" (YLT 1862)
"Have mercy on me, O God, according to thy steadfast love" (RSV 1952)
"Have mercy on me, O God, according to your steadfast love" (NRSV 1989)

In Judaism, love is often used as a shorter English translation. Political theorist Daniel Elazar has suggested that chesed cannot easily be translated into English, but that it means something like 'loving covenant obligation'. Other suggestions include grace and compassion.

== Jewish ethics ==
In traditional musar literature (ethical literature), chesed is one of the primary virtues. The tannaic rabbi Simon the Just taught: "The world rests upon three things: Torah, service to God, and bestowing kindness" (Pirkei Avot 1:2). Chesed is here the core ethical virtue.

A statement by Rabbi Simlai in the Talmud claims that "The Torah begins with chesed and ends with chesed." This may be understood to mean that "the entire Torah is characterized by chesed, i.e. it sets forth a vision of the ideal life whose goals are behavior characterized by mercy and compassion. Alternatively, it may allude to the idea that the giving of the Torah itself is the quintessential act of chesed.

In Moses ben Jacob Cordovero's kabbalistic treatise Tomer Devorah, the following are actions undertaken in imitation of the qualities of chesed:

- love God so completely that one will never forsake his service for any reason
- provide a child with all the necessities of their sustenance and love the child
- circumcise a child
- visiting and healing the sick
- giving charity to the poor
- offering hospitality to strangers
- attending to the dead
- bringing a bride to the chuppah marriage ceremony
- making peace between a person and another human being.

A person who embodies chesed is known as a chasid (hasid, חסיד), one who is faithful to the covenant and who goes "above and beyond that which is normally required" and a number of groups throughout Jewish history which focus on going "above and beyond" have called themselves chasidim. These groups include the Hasideans of the Second Temple period, the Maimonidean Hasidim of medieval Egypt and Palestine, the Chassidei Ashkenaz in medieval Europe, and the Hasidic movement which emerged in eighteenth century Eastern Europe.

=== Charitable organizations ===
In Modern Hebrew, חסד can take the generic meaning of 'charity', and a "chesed institution" in modern Judaism may refer to any charitable organization run by religious Jewish groups or individuals. Charitable organizations described as "chesed institutions" include:

- Bikur cholim organizations, dedicated to visiting and caring for the sick and their relatives
- Gemach – an institution dedicated to gemilut chasadim ('providing kindness'), often with free loan funds or by lending or giving away particular types of items (toys, clothes, medical equipment, etc.). Such organizations are often named with an acronym of Gemilas chasadim such as Gemach or GM"CH. A community may have dozens of unique (and sometimes overlapping) Gemach organizations
- Kiruv organizations – organizations designed to increase Jewish awareness among unaffiliated Jews, which is considered a form of kindness
- Hatzolah – organizations by this name typically provide free services for emergency medical dispatch and ambulance transport (EMTs and paramedics)
- Chevra kadisha – organizations that perform religious care for the deceased, and often provide logistical help to their families relating to autopsies, transport of the body, emergency family travel, burial, running a Shiva home, and caring for mourners
- Chaverim (literally 'friends') – organizations going by this name typically provide free roadside assistance and emergency help with mechanical or structural problems in private homes
- Shomrim (guardians) groups – community watch groups

In the former USSR member republics there are Jewish charities, each one often called a Hesed plus a Jewish given name, usually of a Jewish history character like Hesed Avraam in Saint Petersburg, Russia, a member of Association of Heseds of Russia. They run multiple programs: daycare centres and health visitors/carers for the elderly and disabled (the latter equally available to people of non-Jewish ancestry with local government subsidies), crafts and arts societies, concerts, medical equipment rental for registered patients free or on small fees calculated from the size of the patient's pension, delivery of meals and grocery items to homestay patients, shopping subsidies for the poor, volunteer medical consulting, volunteer small repair of household items, assistance with documents processing to apply for compensation from Germany for Holocaust survivors.

== See also ==
- Agape (Greek, Christianity)
- Divine love
- Hasid
- Ishq (Arabic, Islam)
- Jewish views on love
- Mettā (Pali, Buddhism)
