= Gevurah =

Fifth emanation in Kabbalah

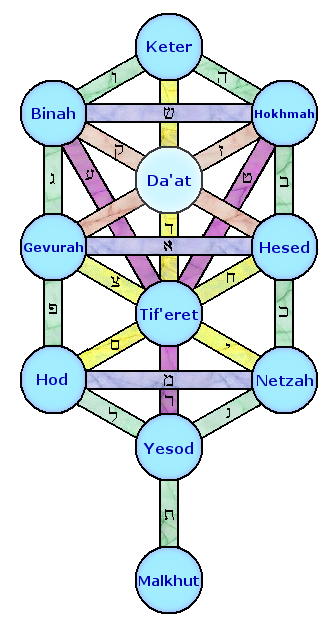
The Sefirot in Kabbalah
The Sefiroth in Jewish Kabbalah
View the image description page for this diagram	The Tree of Life

Gevurah or Geburah (Hebrew: גְּבוּרָה, romanized: Gəvūrā, Tiberian: Găḇūrā, lit. 'bravery', 'heroism'), is the fifth sephirah in the kabbalistic Tree of Life, and it is the second of the emotive attributes of the sephirot. It sits below Binah, across from Chesed and above Hod.

Gevurah is "the essence of judgment (DIN) and limitation", and corresponds to awe and the element of fire.

== Description ==
Gevurah is the fifth of the ten Sefirot and second of the emotive attributes in Creation, and which corresponds to the second day of creation

== Qualities ==
=== Colour ===
According to some modern sources, Gevurah is associated with the color red.

== In Western esotericism ==
The angelic order of this sphere is the Seraphim, ruled by the Archangel Camael. The opposing Qliphah is represented by the demonic order Golachab.
