= Symbolic modeling =

Symbolic modeling is a therapeutic and coaching process developed by psychotherapists Penny Tompkins and James Lawley, based on the work of counselling psychologist David Grove. Using Grove's clean language, a progressive questioning technique using clients' exact words, the facilitator works with a client's self-generating metaphors to clarify personal beliefs, goals, and conflicts, and to bring about meaningful change. Because of its reliance on emergence and self-organization it has been called a "post-modern oriented therapeutic approach".

== Background ==
The practice of symbolic modeling is built upon a foundation of two complementary theories: the metaphors by which we live, and the models by which we create. It regards the individual as a self-organizing system that encodes much of the meaning of feelings, thoughts, beliefs, experiences etc. in the embodied mind as metaphors. Symbolic modeling aims to heighten awareness of clients' personal "symbolic domain of experience", facilitating them to develop a unique "metaphor landscape" and to explore their internal metaphors, which in conceptual metaphor theory are seen to govern behavior.

== Intent ==
The symbolic modeling process guides the client through an exploration of the client's own metaphors, their organization, interactions, and patterns. These embodied metaphors can restrict a client's ways of viewing the world and his or her coping strategies, due to the inner logic prescribed by the metaphors. Without shifting these metaphors, lasting change may be difficult, as the embodied mind may continue to work within the constraints of this old paradigm. Through the facilitation, the client can discover how these metaphors can change to meet their desired outcomes, transformative shifts can occur within a client's "metaphor landscape", bringing about meaningful change on cognitive, affective and behavioral levels.

The "metaphor landscape" phenomenon is not a new discovery, with some similarities to "waking dream" or rêve evéillé, a term coined by Robert Desoille in the 1930s.

== Process ==
Symbolic modeling proceeds through five defined stages, as follows:

- Stage 1: Entering the symbolic domain
- Stage 2: Developing symbolic perceptions
- Stage 3: Modeling symbolic patterns
- Stage 4: Encouraging transformation
- Stage 5: Maturing the evolved landscape

Clean language is used throughout, to avoid contaminating or distorting the developing metaphor landscape through the form, content or presentation of the therapist's questions.

A more structured subset of the above process called symbolic modeling lite is used in coaching:

- Phase 1: Set up
- Phase 2: Identify a desired outcome
- Phase 3: Develop a desired outcome landscape
- Phase 4: Explore effects of desired outcome landscape
- Phase 5: Mature changes as they occur
- Phase 6: Set down

== Evidence base ==
A number of studies have assessed the efficacy of symbolic modeling with 95 dyslexic coachees; in a psychotherapy case study; and in an organisational setting.

== Other applications ==
While therapy and coaching are the primary application areas of symbolic modeling, researchers have started to apply the method to metaphor research, game design, problem solving, modelling excellence, and as a qualitative research methodology.
