= Jewish views on love =

Judaism offers a variety of views regarding the love of God, love among human beings, and love for non-human animals. Love is a central value in Jewish ethics and Jewish theology.

== Love among human beings ==
One of the core commandments of Judaism is "Love your neighbor as yourself" (Leviticus 19:18). This commandment stands at the center of the central book in the Torah. The Talmudic sages Hillel and Rabbi Akiva indicated that this is the central commandment of the Torah. The commandment emboldens individuals to treat each other as equals which requires first valuing oneself in order to be able to mirror that love onto others. Similarly, another significant commandment is to “not stand idly by the blood of your neighbor” (Leviticus 19:16), which can be exhibited in many forms. Some Jewish sources have emphasized the importance of self-sacrifice in regards to putting our needs second to another's, but Rabbi Akiva's teaching of "Your own life takes precedence to that of another," contradicts his own principle of loving thy neighbor as thyself.

This commandment of love, with the preceding sentence, "Thou shalt not avenge nor bear any grudge against the children of thy people," may originally have referred, and has by some scholars been exclusively referred, to the Israelite neighbor; but in Leviticus 19:34 it is extended to "the stranger that dwells with you . . . and thou shalt love him as thyself." In Job 31:13–15 it is declared unjust to wrong the servant in his cause: "Did not he that made me in the womb make him? and did not one fashion us in the womb?"

Romantic love is included in the command to love one's neighbor, but romantic love per se is not a central topic in classical Jewish literature. Some medieval rabbinic authorities such as Judah Halevi wrote romantic poetry in Arabic.

=== Classical rabbinic literature ===
Commenting upon the command to love the neighbor is a discussion recorded between Rabbi Akiva, who declared this verse in Leviticus to contain the great principle of the Law ("Kelal gadol ba-Torah"), and Ben Azzai, who pointed to Genesis 5:1 ("This is the book of the generations of Adam; in the day that God created man, in the likeness of God made he him"), as the verse expressing the leading principle of the Law, apparently because verse 5:1 gives the term "neighbor" its meaning as including all humans. R. Tanhuma explains the principle thus: "If you despise any man, you despise God who made man in His image."

Hillel also took the Biblical command in this universal spirit when he responded to the heathen who requested him to tell the Law while standing before him on one foot: "What is hateful to thee, thou shalt not do unto thy neighbor. This is the whole of the Law, the rest is only commentary". This negative form was the accepted Targum interpretation of Lev. 19:18, though Targum Onkelos translates the verse literally. To include all men, Hillel used the term "beriot" (creatures) when inculcating the teaching of love: "Love the fellow-creatures". Hatred of fellow-creatures ("sinat ha-beriyot") is similarly declared by R. Joshua b. Hananiah to be one of the three things that drive man out of the world.

The Talmud insists, with reference to Lev. 19:18, that even the criminal at the time of execution should be treated with tender love. As Schechter in "J. Q. R." 10:11, shows, the expression "You have heard . . ." is an inexact translation of the rabbinical formula, which is only a formal logical interrogation introducing the opposite view as the only correct one: "You might deduce from this verse that thou shalt love thy neighbor and hate thine enemy, but I say to you the only correct interpretation is, Love all men, even thine enemies." According to Ahad Ha-am, the Torah's phrasing of "thou shalt love thy neighbor as thyself" is negative because it creates a "perfect equilibrium, with no leaning either to your side or to your neighbour's."

Tanna Devei Eliyahu says: "Blessed be the Lord who is impartial toward all. He says: 'Thou shalt not defraud thy neighbor. Thy neighbor is like thy brother, and thy brother is like thy neighbor.'" and later on: "Thou shalt love the Lord thy God"; that is, thou shalt make the name of God beloved to the creatures by a righteous conduct toward Gentiles as well as Jews.

=== Kabbalistic and Hasidic sources ===
Hayyim Vital taught that the law of love of the neighbor includes the non-Israelite as well as the Israelite. A similar view was taught by Aaron b. Abraham ibn Ḥayyim of the sixteenth century, in his commentary to Sifre, and by Moses Hagiz of the eighteenth century, in his work on the 613 commandments, while commenting on Deut. 23:7.

One of the main tenets of Hassidut is that everything in the universe exists only because the Creator wills it to exist. Therefore, the existence of even the most vile and wicked human beings are a manifestation of Hashem's will, and ultimately, their physical survival is due to that same divine energy that allows the entire creation to survive. And even though it is indeed a positive commandment to despise evil, the true tzaddik understands that the existence of even the most wicked human beings are in accordance with the Creator's will. This understanding is tantamount to love, as it stems from a love of Hashem and his ways. According to R' Nachman, this is the sod of "Ad delo yada bein arur Haman le'varuch Mordechai".

Some Jews, however, have criticized Kabbalistic and Hasidic views of love.

=== Musar movement ===
One of the leaders of the Musar movement, Rabbi Simcha Zissel Ziv, put much emphasis on love.

A later Musar movement leader, the 20th-century rabbi Eliyahu Eliezer Dessler is frequently quoted as defining love from the Jewish point-of-view as "giving without expecting to take".

=== Modern Jewish views ===
The synod at Leipsic in 1869, and the German-Israelitish Union of Congregations in 1885, stood on old historical ground when declaring that "'Love thy neighbor as thyself' is a command of all-embracing love, and is a fundamental principle of the Jewish religion."

=== Modern Jewish Debates on Love and Justice ===
The 20th-century Jewish theologian Will Herberg argued that "justice" is at the heart of the Jewish notion of love, and the foundation for Jewish law:

The ultimate criterion of justice, as of everything else in human life, is the divine imperative—the law of love .... Justice is the institutionalization of love in society .... This law of love requires that every man be treated as a Thou, a person, an end in himself, never merely as a thing or a means to another's end. When this demand is translated into laws and institutions under the conditions of human life in history, justice arises.

The Jewish tradition often encourages the elimination of “otherness” instead for all to see each other as moral counterparts and emphasizes the obligation to render aid and intervene autonomously, doing the right thing because it is right, not in a heteronomous way, doing the right thing because we feel we must. The tradition teaches not to simply love, but to tolerate in order to be able to achieve justice.

Contemporary Rabbi Jill Jacobs has emphasized that the limits of love as a motivation for giving to others. As a way to extend one's hand to the community, one can give Tzedakah, or charity, which comes from the word Tzedek meaning justice, compassion and mercy. As an obligation, one must give to the poor “as a means of restoring justice to the world…not as an altruistic or voluntary gesture.” A way to outwardly and tangibly exhibit love is by giving. For example, giving money out of “passion for causes, out of love or concern for others, out of gratitude for our own good fortune, and out of desire to create a better world for ourselves and our children.” By giving to the community, one can demonstrate love outwardly while also embracing it inwardly.

Love has also been expressed as being the selflessness of mankind (Louis Jacobs, Greater Love Hath No Man). Humans have the capacity to self-sacrifice in the interest of others, as every life is valuable and unique. When one risks his or her own life to save another, it is seen as an act of piety and an act of love and justice which “advocates the most excessive altruism…” (Greater Love Hath No Man). In order to be selfless then, one must be able to “attach moral value to the individual as such, without any distinction between the self and the other.”

The Jewish tradition finds validity to the idea of love as well as the acts that supplement it. These acts are centered on ideas widely associated with love in many different traditions such as kindness, respect, compassion, and empathy. There is inherent value to every soul because they are human. Rabbi Laurie Zoloth-Dorfman states, “The conscience can be said, then, not to be the speaking of the voice within but rather the hearing of the quiet voice of the other, this voice, just as clearly as one’s “own,” must remind us to see each child as our own, each journey and each need as fundamentally shared.” Rather than finding compassion within oneself, we are obligated to find compassion from our empathy and natural connectedness to others. This love for one’s neighbor because they are ones neighbor is an important theme seen in modern views of love in Jewish ethics.

Love can be expressed in a myriad of ways in the Jewish tradition. One way is putting others before oneself. There are several arguments to do this, but one of the most compelling is because one does not know the value of their life. Rabbi Louis Jacobs states, “But no human being can know which life is of greater value. Hence, it is forbidden to save one’s life by committing murder.” Some interpretations state that each person is of different value based on a set of variables that are difficult to quantify. There is love to be found in sacrificing oneself because of an understanding that someone else's life could be more valuable to the world or to God. Rabbi David Novak states “Rather, many a Jewish source maintains that God affords every human being the opportunity to choose his or her moral fate, and will then judge him or her, and choose whether to love him or her, on the basis of that decision.” In this way, God can decide whether to love a person based on their decisions in the same way a person can choose to love another person. This idea of God withholding love is not necessarily the predominant one in the modern Jewish tradition, but it is an important concept in the discussion of love and Jewish ethics.

== Love for animals ==
Some Jewish sources also highlight the importance of love and compassion for non-human animals. Thus, for example, the Jewish philosopher Lenn Goodman speaks of how laws regarding the suffering of animals ideally "create a sensibility of love and kindness." Hava Tirosh-Samuelson, a Jewish historian believed that at the core of Judaism the covenantal model between the Jewish people, God, and the Land of Israel, explains our “obligation to respond to the needs of the other." Tirosh-Samuelson thought about the possible meanings when this model was expanded to include the earth as a whole, showing the importance of treating all living creatures with respect. There is a story in the Talmud on how Judah HaNasi was struck with pain because he did not show mercy to a calf being led to slaughter, and only after saving a mouse's nest he was forgiven.

== Love between God and human beings ==
Deuteronomy 6: 4–5 commands: "Hear O Israel, the Lord is our God; the Lord is one. You shall love the Lord your God with all your heart, with all your soul, and with all your might."

=== Classical rabbinic literature ===
The commandment to love God in Deut. 6 is taken by the Mishnah (a central text of the Jewish oral law) to refer to good deeds, willingness to sacrifice one's life rather than commit certain serious transgressions, willingness to sacrifice all one's possessions and being grateful to the Lord despite adversity (tractate Berachoth 9:5, tractate Sanhedrin 74a). Rabbinic literature differs how this love can be developed.

The love of God means the surrounding of life with his commandments (Men. 43b) and is conditioned by the love of the Torah (R. H. 4a). Israel is said to love him, giving their very lives for the observance of his commandments (Mek., Yitro, 6, to Ex. xx. 6). Indeed, love of God is voluntary surrender of life and all one has for God's honor (Sifre, Deut. 32; Ber. 54a). It is unselfish service of God (Abot i. 3; 'Ab Zarah 19a). There are chastisements of love for the righteous to test their piety (Ber. 5a; comp. Rom. v. 3). It is this unequaled love, braving suffering and martyrdom, which established the unique relation between God and Israel, so that "none of the nations can quench this love" (Cant. R. viii. 7). This unique love is echoed also in the liturgy (see Ahabah Rabbah). To be a true "lover of God," however, means "to receive offense, and resent not; to hear words of contumely, and answer not; to act merely from love, and rejoice even in trials as tests of pure love" (Shab. 88b; Soṭah 31a; comp. Rom. viii. 28).

=== Bahya Ibn Pakuda ===
Love of God is accentuated as the highest incentive of action by Baḥya ibn Paḳuda, in "Ḥobot ha-Lebabot" (see Jew. Encyc. ii. 454). In Duties of the Heart, the Jewish philosopher maintained that love of God is the ultimate goal and must be the aim of all virtues. Bahya defined this love as the soul's longing for the creator and this is also made possible through the fear of God, which allows people to abstain from worldly desires. It appears that fear is linked to love in the sense that it stems from the contemplation of God's power and greatness, which could result to emotional attachment seen in parts of the Psalm and elsewhere in the Bible. Once a religious person empties himself of the love for material things, he then opens himself up to be filled with the love of God. These arguments led some observers to describe Bahya's concept of love towards the creator as more focused on the emotion instead of putting emphasis on the rational or mystical aspects. Love towards other people and even animals could fall within Bahya's framework when approached from his view that we cannot know God as He is in Himself and that it is only through his creatures that we can gain an apprehension of the Divine.

=== Maimonides ===
Maimonides, in his Mishneh Torah, devotes the whole tenth chapter of Hilkot Teshubah, with reference to Abot i. 3, to love of God as the motive which gives all human action its true ethical and religious value. Maimonides wrote that it should only be out of love for God, rather than fear of punishment or hope for reward, that Jews should obey the law: "When man loves God with a love that is fitting he automatically carries out all the precepts of love". Maimonides thinks that love of God can be developed by contemplating Divine deeds or witnessing the marvels of nature (Maimonides, Mishneh Torah, Hilchot Yesoday HaTorah, Chapter 2).

=== Nahmanides ===
Naḥmanides in his commentary to Deut. vi. 4, with reference to Sifre, l.c., declares that love of God involves the study and observance of the Law without regard to gain or expectation of reward; so also Baḥya ben Asher, in his "Kad ha-Ḳemaḥ," under "Ahabah."

=== Eleazar of Worms ===
R. Eleazar of Worms, in his ethical work "Roḳeaḥ," begins with the chapter on love, referring to Sifre, Deut. 32, 41, 48; Ber. 54a; Yoma 86a; Ned. 62a; Soṭah 31a; Tanna debe Eliyahu xxvi.; Midr. Teh. to Ps. xiii. 2 ("I love Thee; that is, 'I love Thy creatures'"); and Midr. Tadshe xii., and stating that he who truly loves God subordinates all other desires and cares to the one great object of life—the fulfilment of God's will in joy.

=== Kabbalistic views ===
Still more extensively does Elijah de Vidas, in his ethical work "Reshit Ḥokmah" (part 2), dwell on love of God as the highest aim and motive of life. He also quotes the Zohar (i. 11b; ii. 114, 116a; iii. 68a, 264b, 267a; and other passages), where it is frequently stated that pure love is suppression of all care for self, and through such love true union of the soul with God is effected. This union is said by the Kabbalists to take place in the celestial "palace of love" (Zohar i. 44b, ii. 97a).

=== Crescas ===
Still greater importance was attached to love when it was rendered a cosmic principle in the philosophical systems of Hasdai Crescas and, through him, of Spinoza. Instead of rendering the creative intellect the essence of the Deity, as did Maimonides and all the Aristotelians, Crescas, like Philo, makes love the essential quality of God. Love is divine bliss, and hence love of God is the source of eternal bliss for mortal man.

=== Judah Leon Abravanel ===
But, more than Crescas, it was probably Judah Leon Abravanel from whom Spinoza borrowed the idea of "intellectual love" as a cosmic principle, and who, following the Platonic and pantheistic tendency of the period of the Italian Renaissance, made (in his "Dialoghi di Amore") the "amore intellectivo" and "amore mentale" or "rationale" the essence of God and the central force and end of the world. "Love links all things together in the cosmos, but while love in the natural world is sensual and selfish, divine love is unselfish and uplifting. God's love created the world and brings about the perfection of all things, especially of man, who, when good, is God-loving as well as God-beloved, and whose love of God leads him to eternal bliss, which is identical with divine love." This intellectual love is identical with the Biblical "to him [God] shalt thou cleave" and gives rise to the "imitatio Dei." It is highest perfection and supreme joy. Abravanel's view of love as the principle of the world appears to have exerted some influence also upon Schiller in his "Philosophische Briefe" (1838, x. 289)

=== Franz Rosenzweig ===
The 20th-century Jewish philosopher Franz Rosenzweig described divine love as cleansing:

It is not God that need cleanse it [the soul of the beloved, i.e. Israel] of its sin. Rather it cleanses itself in the presence of his love. It is certain of God's love in the very moment that shame withdraws from it and it surrenders itself in free, present admission—as certain as if God had spoken into its ear that "I forgive" which is longed for earlier when it confessed to him its sins of the past. It no longer needs this formal absolution. It is freed of its burden at the very moment of daring to assume all of it on its shoulders. So too the beloved no longer needs the acknowledgment of the lover which she longed for before she admitted her love. At the very moment when she herself dares to admit it, she is as certain of his love as if he were whispering his acknowledgment into her ear.

Rosenzweig described the Hebrew Bible as a "grammar of love" in which God can communicate "I love you" only by demanding "You must love me," and Israel can communicate "I love you" only by confessing "I have sinned." Therefore, this confession does not lead God to offer an unnecessary absolution; it merely expresses Israel's love for God. "What then is God's answer to this 'I am thine' by which the beloved soul acknowledges him" if it is not "absolution?" Rosenzweig's answer is: revelation: "He cannot make himself known to the soul before the soul has acknowledged him. But now he must do so. For this it is by which revelation first reaches completion. In its groundless presentness, revelation must now permanently touch the ground." Revelation, epitomized by Sinai, is God's response to Israel's love. Contrary to Paul, who argued that "through the law comes knowledge of sin", Rosenzweig argues that it is because of and after a confession of sin that God reveals to Israel knowledge of the law.

Rosenzweig believes that for the rabbis, Song of Songs provides a paradigm for understanding the love between God and Israel, a love that "is strong as death". God's love is as strong as death because it is love for the People Israel, and it is as a collective that Israel returns God's love. Thus, although one may die, God and Israel, and the love between them, lives on. In other words, Song of Songs is "the focal book of revelation" where the "grammar of love" is most clearly expressed. But this love that is as strong as death ultimately transcends itself, as it takes the form of God's law—for it is the law that binds Israel as a people, and through observance of the law that each Jew relives the moment of revelation at Mt. Sinai. Ultimately, Song of Songs points back to Leviticus's command to love one's neighbor as oneself and to the rest of the Torah.

Through the revelation of God's commandments, in Rosenzweig's view, the love portrayed in Song of Songs becomes the love commanded in Leviticus. Just as love for the Children of Israel is one of the ways that God is present in the world, the necessary response by the Jews—the way to love God in return—is to extend their own love out towards their fellow human beings.

== See also ==
- Chesed
- Religious views on love
- Tzedakah

== Sources ==
- Rothenberg, Naftali, The Wisdom of Love—Man, Woman & God in Jewish Canonical Literature, Boston 2009, Academic Studies Press.
- Rothenberg, Naftali, Rabbi Akiva's Philosophy of Love, New York 2017. Palgrave-Macmillan.
- Rosenzweig (1970) Star of Redemption, University of Wisconsin Press
