= Jewish reactions to intelligent design =

The reaction of Jewish leaders and organizations to intelligent design has been primarily concerned with responding to proposals to include intelligent design in public school curricula as a rival scientific hypothesis to modern evolutionary theory.

Intelligent design is an argument for the existence of God, based on the premise that "certain features of the universe and of living things are best explained by an intelligent cause, not an undirected process such as natural selection." Proponents claim that their hypothesis is scientific, and that it challenges the dominant scientific model of evolution. This has been dismissed by scientific opposition as pseudoscience, and in the 2005 Kitzmiller v. Dover Area School District federal court case, United States District Judge John E. Jones III ruled that intelligent design is not science and is essentially religious in nature.

Scholar Noah J. Efron wrote in 2014:

No American Jewish organization advocates teaching intelligent design in public schools. No Jewish religious body endorses it. Official representatives of all the major streams of Judaism -- Reform, Conservative, Orthodox & Reconstructionist -- have denounced it; only Ultra-Orthodox Jews, who in any case vigilantly oppose sending Jewish children to public school, have expressed sympathy for teaching intelligent design in the schools they refuse to attend, and even then in very small numbers. ... In a famously fractious community ... almost all American Jews agree that intelligent design has no place in the public school science curriculum. And polls consistently show that Jews hold this view far more commonly than members of any other religious or ethnic group in America.

== Jewish organizations ==
A number of Jewish organizations have fought against the inclusion of intelligent design in the public school curriculum, generally on the basis that to teach intelligent design in public schools would be a violation of the separation of church and state.

In 2005, Jeffrey Sinensky, general counsel for the American Jewish Committee, praised the court ruling in Kitzmiller v. Dover School District. Sinensky stated: "Intelligent design is not a scientifically accepted theory, but a religious theory similar to creationism, which has no place in the science classroom of a public school. Any discussion of creationism or intelligent design would be more appropriate in a history or comparative religion class, as opposed to a science curriculum."

According to the Anti-Defamation League, "The U.S. Constitution guarantees the rights of Americans to believe the religious theories of creation (as well as other theories) but it does not permit religious theories to be taught in public school science classes. This distinction makes sense, and is ultimately good for religion, because it leaves religious instruction to properly trained clergy and to parents (where religious education properly belongs), it keeps government out of religious controversies, and it ensures that public school classrooms remain hospitable to an ethnically diverse, religiously pluralistic country."

In a survey of doctors conducted under the auspices of the Jewish Theological Seminary, 83 percent of Jewish doctors agreed with the statement that intelligent design is "a religiously inspired pseudo-science" rather than a "legitimate scientific speculation"

To Rabbi Brad Hirschfield, vice president the National Jewish Center for Learning and Leadership (CLAL), an interdenominational Jewish organization, the intelligent design theorists themselves have unscientific goals. "Excluding those Darwinians who understand their position to be a proof against the existence of a creator — itself a kind of fundamentalist position — the primary interest of evolutionary biology is the deepening of our understanding of life, regardless of the theological implications. The premise of intelligent design theory is that it can provide evidence that confirms the existence of a specific kind of creator. If it failed to do so, then not only would the theory be wrong, but the proponents of it would see themselves as having failed in their pursuit of knowledge and in their attempt to confirm what they already believe."

== Reform Judaism ==
In 2005, the 68th General Assembly of the Union for Reform Judaism passed a resolution, The Politicization of Science in the United States, in which it opposed the teaching of intelligent design in the schools: "Intelligent design proponents are increasingly, and with success, seeking to use public schools to advance this concept, suggesting that 'intelligent design' holds scientific merit equal to the theory of evolution. The overwhelming majority of the scientific community, which supports theories that are testable by experiment or observation, oppose treating intelligent design, which is neither, as scientific theory."

== Conservative Judaism ==
According to Jeffrey H. Tigay, writing in Conservative Judaism (the official publication of the Conservative movement), "a literal reading of the Bible, on which "creation science" implicitly insists, misses the point of the Bible itself, which seems uninterested in literal interpretation. Like poetry and certain kinds of prose, which sometimes speak in metaphors and symbols, the Bible as a whole does not intend these stories to be taken literally."

Rabbis have often expressed this opinion even while distinguishing their own theistic views of life from those of Darwinism. For example, to Rabbi Michael Schwab, a pulpit rabbi in the Conservative movement, "What Darwin sees as random, we see as the miraculous and natural unfolding of God’s subtle and beautiful plan." However, Schwab disagrees with the intelligent design movement's claim, that the existence of God can be proven as "a practical scientific theory that has equal evidence in science as evolution." Schwab writes, "We cannot prove God’s existence through science any more than we can prove that there is an afterlife in that manner. God's existence is not subject to empirical data, there is no experiment to be done in this matter of which the results can be replicated in the future."

Rabbi Steven Morgen, the rabbi of congregation Beth Yeshurun, a Conservative synagogue in Houston, Texas, asked his congregation, "So why do I, as a Rabbi, object to having our schools teach “intelligent design” as part of the science curriculum when they teach the theory of evolution? Because it is not science. The scientific method of discovering "truth" involves developing an assumption (or hypothesis), and then attempting to prove or disprove that assumption by experiment and/or observation. There is no experiment we can create that will prove or disprove that an Intelligent Designer interfered in the natural progression of life on earth to create different organs or species of animals."

Morgan goes on to explain his own beliefs. "Can I describe how God was involved in this process? No. Can I prove that God was involved in this process? No. As I said, our beliefs are not science. They are not provable. But I believe that God was involved because even if we can explain scientifically how all this might have happened through the evolutionary process, it is still a miraculous world to me, and so I believe that whatever we discover scientifically to be "the way it happened" is how God made it happen. I believe that God not only created the Universe in this way, but that God continues to exist in our lives whenever we recognize God’s presence. God cares deeply about us and is there for us when we call upon our Creator."

== Orthodox Judaism ==
=== Modern Orthodox ===
Many leaders of Modern Orthodox Judaism expressed similar views about intelligent design. For example, Rabbi Dr. Tzvi Hersh Weinreb, the executive Vice President of the Orthodox Union told the daily Haaretz, "Intelligent Design calls to our attention the amazing complexity of the universe. That is descriptive science and should be part of all courses in biology and chemistry. However, the conclusion that such complexity is proof positive of a Creator, as Judaism or other religions understand such a creator, is faith, not science, and as such has no place in the curricula of the public schools in the United States, where separation of Church from State is a fundamental national premise." Weinreb continued, "In a religious school, particularly in a Jewish school, I would advocate that evolution as understood by the scientific establishment be taught in courses of science, and that Intelligent Design be taught in courses of Jewish thought."

But there was some dissent at the Sixth Miami International Conference on Torah and Science, held in Miami, Florida, in December 2005. Moshe Tendler, an influential Orthodox rabbi and a professor of biology at Yeshiva University, urged his Orthodox scientific colleagues to examine the theory of intelligent design. Tendler attacked the idea that complex life could flow from "random evolution." The following morning, an intelligent design proponent, William Dembski (a Professor of Philosophy at Southwestern Baptist Theological Seminary and an evangelical Christian), sought to present evidence of design in nature. These addresses prompted a storm of protest from scientists at the conference, who besieged Dembski with so many questions that the next speaker on the agenda was unable to follow him.

Journalist Mariah Blake reported that scientists who attended the conference, most of them observant Orthodox Jews, were generally critical of intelligent design. Nathan Aviezar, who teaches physics at Bar Ilan University in Israel commented, "The whole enterprise of science is to explain life without invoking supernatural explanations. Intelligent design is not science, it's religion, and it shouldn't be taught in science class." However, local Orthodox Jewish high school students, bussed in to observe the conference, were more receptive.

Nathan Katz, one of the conference organizers, commented that the enthusiasm some Orthodox Jews express for intelligent design reflects a growing alliance between traditional Jews and evangelical Christians. The two groups have found themselves on the same side of many culture war battles, and evangelicals have offered significant financial support for Israel. Katz explained, this has made Orthodox Jews "willing to listen to evangelicals on other issues."

==== The anthropic principle ====
Nathan Aviezar, an Orthodox Jewish scientist, has promoted an alternative perspective within Orthodox Jewry on how God is involved in creation, the anthropic principle. "Unlike intelligent design, the anthropic principle operates within the framework of science. In other words, the anthropic principle does not claim that science is insufficient to explain the physical universe."

==== The theological problems of intelligent design ====
Natan Slifkin, in his work The Challenge of Creation, condemns the intelligent design community as presenting a theologically problematic perspective of God, and which, is thus, surreptitiously very dangerous to religion. Those who promote it as parallel to religion, he asserts, do not truly understand it.

Slifkin criticizes intelligent design's advocacy of teaching their perspective in biology classes, wondering why no one claims that God's hand should be taught in other secular classes, such as history, physics or geology. He asserts that the intelligent design movement is inordinately concerned with portraying God as "in control" when it comes to things that cannot be easily explained by science, such as the bacterial flagellum and the blood-clotting system, but that he is not in control in respect to things which can be explained by scientific theory, such as planetary motion and the formation of the world.

There is a risk in undertaking such a project, of course, as the theistic evolutionists constantly remind us by referring to the need to avoid resorting to a "God of the gaps." If the naturalistic understanding of reality is truly correct and complete, then God will have to retreat out of the cosmos altogether. I do not think the risk is very great, but in any case I do think theists should meet it with a preemtive surrender.

— Phillip Johnson, Darwin on Trial, page 169

Slifkin challenges Johnson's statement that "God will have to retreat out of the cosmos," because he asserts that a "complete explanation of the celestial bodies by astronomy, or an explanation of the formation of the mountains by geology, or of rain via meteorology, does not paint God out of the picture, but instead means that He works through science," something that Johnson denies.

Slifkin concluded by emphasizing that intelligent design is no friend of religion, in that it "denies the role of God in 99% of the universe...and implies that He was only able to engineer processes that would accomplish 99% of His objectives. Postulating the intelligent design of organisms means postulating the unintelligent design of natural law." This point is built on comments made by Kenneth Miller in his work, The Flagellum Unspun:

[T]he struggles of the Intelligent Design movement are best understood as clamorous and disappointing double failures - rejected by science because they do not fit the facts, and having failed religion because they think too little of God.

— Kenneth Miller, "The Flagellum Unspun", in Debating Design, page 95

== See also ==
- Jewish views on evolution
