= Angels in art =

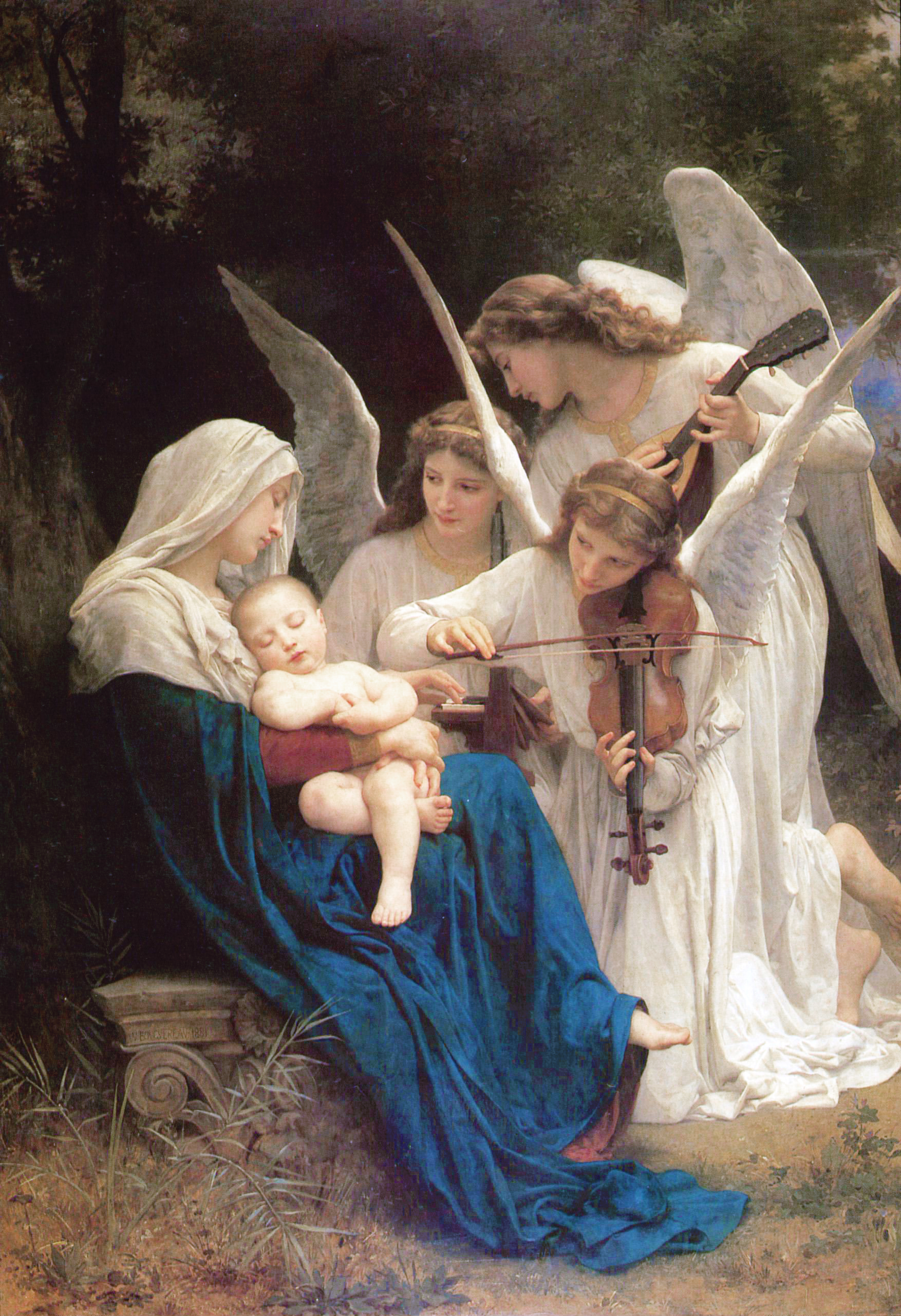
Song of the Angels (1881) by William-Adolphe Bouguereau (1825–1905)

Angels have appeared in works of art since early Christian art, and they have been a popular subject for Byzantine and European paintings and sculpture.

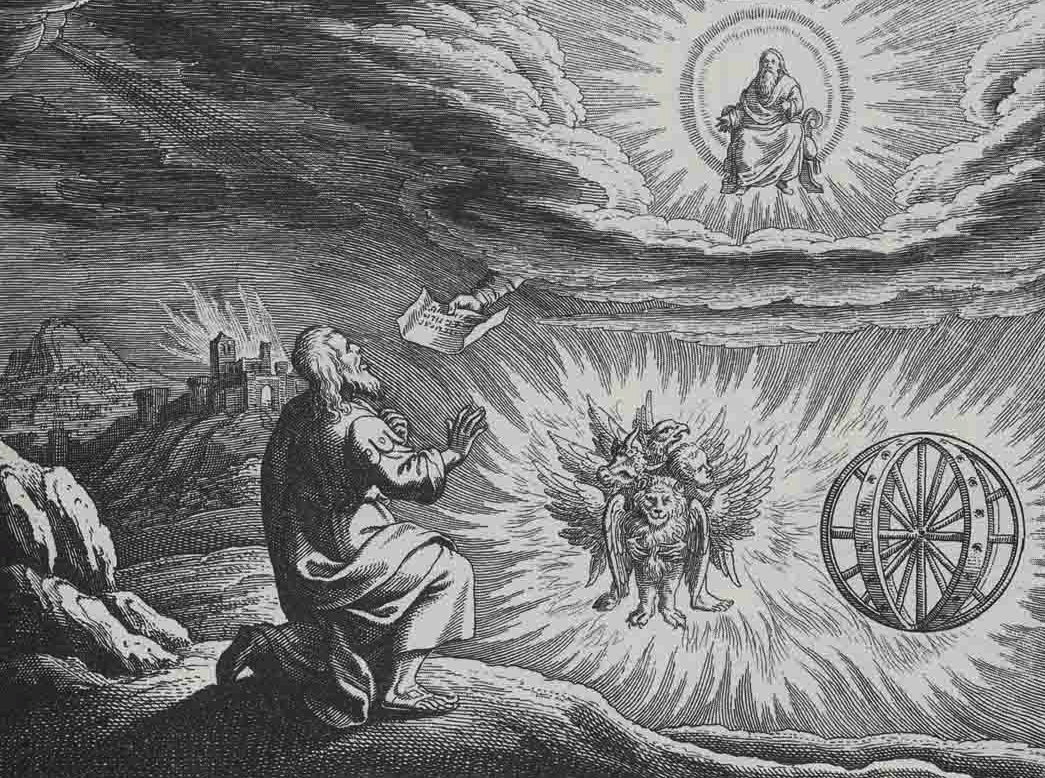
Ezekiel's "chariot vision", by Matthaeus Merian (1593–1650), displaying several different types of angelic creatures.

Normally given wings in art, angels are usually intended, in both Christian and Islamic art, to be beautiful, though several depictions go for more awe-inspiring or frightening attributes, notably in the depiction of the living creatures (which have bestial characteristics), ophanim (which are wheels) and cherubim (which have mosaic features); As a matter of theology, they are spiritual beings who do not eat or excrete and are genderless. Many historical depictions of angels may appear to the modern eye to be gendered as either male or female by their dress or actions, but until the 19th century, even the most feminine looking angels would normally lack breasts, and the figures were normally considered as genderless. In 19th-century art, especially funerary art, this traditional convention is sometimes abandoned.

== Christian art ==
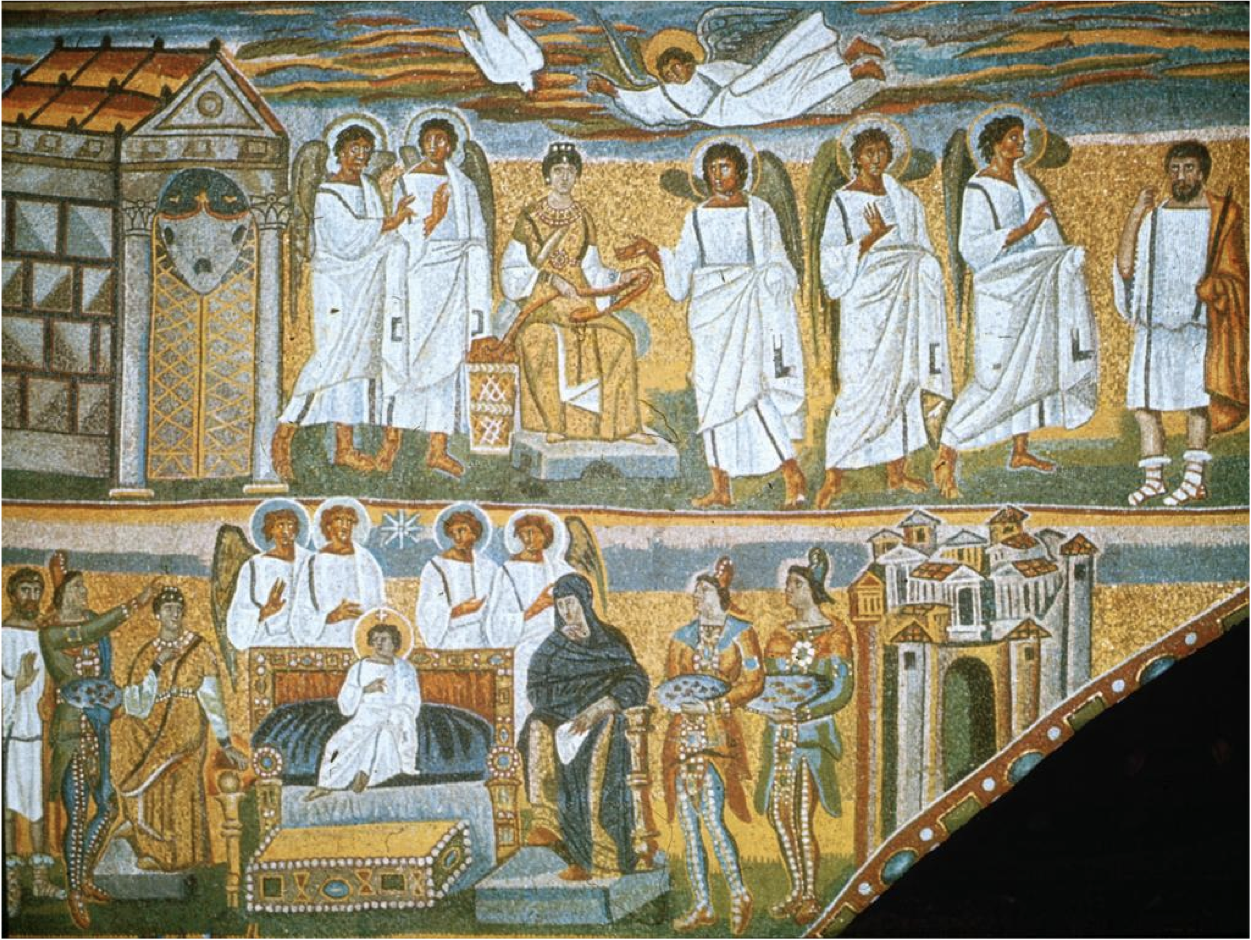
Winged angels in togas, Basilica di Santa Maria Maggiore, Rome (432–440)

=== In the early Church ===
Specific ideas regarding how to portray angels began to develop in the early Church. Since angels are defined as pure spirits, the lack of a defined form has allowed artists wide latitude for creativity. Daniel 8:15 describes Gabriel as appearing in the "likeness of man" and in Daniel 9:21 he is referred to as "the man Gabriel." Such anthropomorphic descriptions of an angel are consistent with previous descriptions of angels, as in Genesis 19:5. They were usually depicted in the form of young men.

The earliest known Christian image of an angel, in the Cubicolo dell'Annunziazione in the Catacomb of Priscilla, which is dated to the middle of the third century, is a depiction of the Annunciation in which Gabriel is portrayed without wings. Representations of angels on sarcophagi and on objects such as lamps and reliquaries of that period also show them without wings, as for example the angel in the Sacrifice of Isaac scene in the Sarcophagus of Junius Bassus.

In a third-century fresco of the Hebrew children in the furnace, in the cemetery of St. Priscilla, a dove takes the place of the angel, while a fourth-century representation of the same subject, in the coemeterium maius, substitutes the Hand of God for the heavenly messenger.

The earliest known representation of angels with wings is on what is called the Prince's Sarcophagus, discovered at Sarigüzel, near Istanbul, in the 1930s, and attributed to the time of Theodosius I (379–395). Flying winged angels, very often in pairs flanking a central figure or subject, are derivations in visual terms from pairs of winged Victories in classical art.

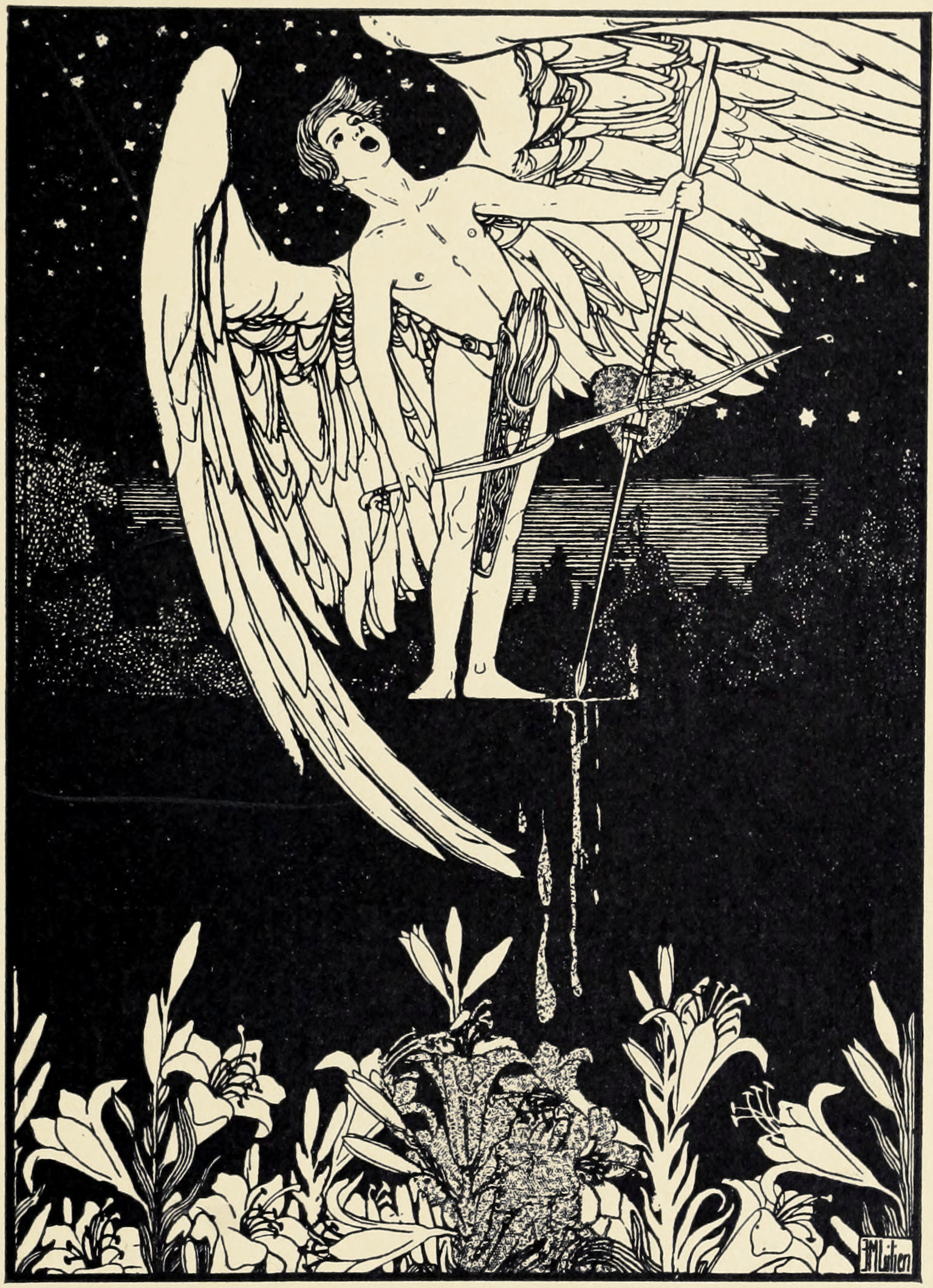
Auf zarten Saiten by Ephraim Moses Lilien, 1900

In this same period, Saint John Chrysostom explained the significance of angels' wings: "They manifest a nature's sublimity. That is why Gabriel is represented with wings. Not that angels have wings, but that you may know that they leave the heights and the most elevated dwelling to approach human nature. Accordingly, the wings attributed to these powers have no other meaning than to indicate the sublimity of their nature."

From then on Christian art generally represented angels with wings, as in the cycle of mosaics in the Basilica di Santa Maria Maggiore (432–440). Multi-winged angels, often with only their face and wings showing, drawn from the higher grades of angels, especially cherubim and seraphim, are derived from Persian art, and are usually shown only in heavenly contexts, as opposed to performing tasks on Earth. They often appear in the pendentives of domes or semi-domes of churches.

=== Byzantine art ===
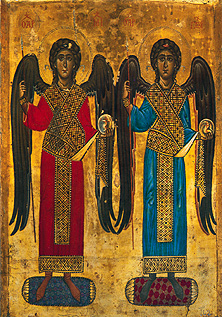
12th-century icon of the Archangels Michael and Gabriel wearing the loros of the Imperial guards.

Angels appear in Byzantine art in mosaics and icons. Artists found some of their inspiration from winged Greek figures such as "Victory". They also drew from imperial iconography. Court eunuchs could rise to positions of authority in the Empire. They performed ceremonial functions and served as trusted messengers. Amelia R. Brown points out that legislation under Justinian indicates that many of them came from the Caucasus, having light eyes, hair, and skin, as well as the "comely features and fine bodies" desired by slave traders. Those "castrated in childhood developed a distinctive skeletal structure, lacked full masculine musculature, body hair and beards,...." As officials, they would wear a white tunic decorated with gold. Brown suggests that "Byzantine artists drew, consciously or not, on this iconography of the court eunuch".

Daniel 10: 5–6 describes an angel as clothed in linen and girt with gold. Angels, especially the archangel Michael, who were depicted as military-style agents of God, came to be shown wearing Late Antique military uniform. This could be either the normal military dress, with a tunic to about the knees, armour breastplate and pteruges, but also often the specific dress of the bodyguard of the Byzantine Emperor, with a long tunic and the loros, a long gold and jewelled pallium restricted to the Imperial family and their closest guards, and in icons to archangels. The basic military dress it is still worn in pictures into the Baroque period and beyond in the West, and up to the present day in Eastern Orthodox icons. Other angels came to be conventionally depicted in long robes.

=== Medieval art ===
Medieval depictions of angels borrow from the Byzantine. In the French Hours of Anne of Brittany, Gabriel wears a dalmatic. In the later Middle Ages they often wear the vestments of a deacon, a cope over a dalmatic, especially Gabriel in Annunciation scenes – for example The Annunciation by Jan van Eyck. This indicated that, for all their powers, they could not perform the Eucharist, and were in this respect outranked by every priest, reinforcing the prestige of the clergy. In Early Christian art white robes were almost invariably adopted, sometimes bound with the "golden girdle" of Revelation. During the mediæval period senior angels were often clad in every brilliant colour, while junior ranks wore white. Early Renaissance painters such as Jan van Eyck and Fra Angelico painted angels with multi-colored wings. Depictions of angels came to combine medieval notions of beauty with feminine ideals of grace and beauty, as in da Panicale's 1435 Baptism of Christ.

=== Renaissance art ===
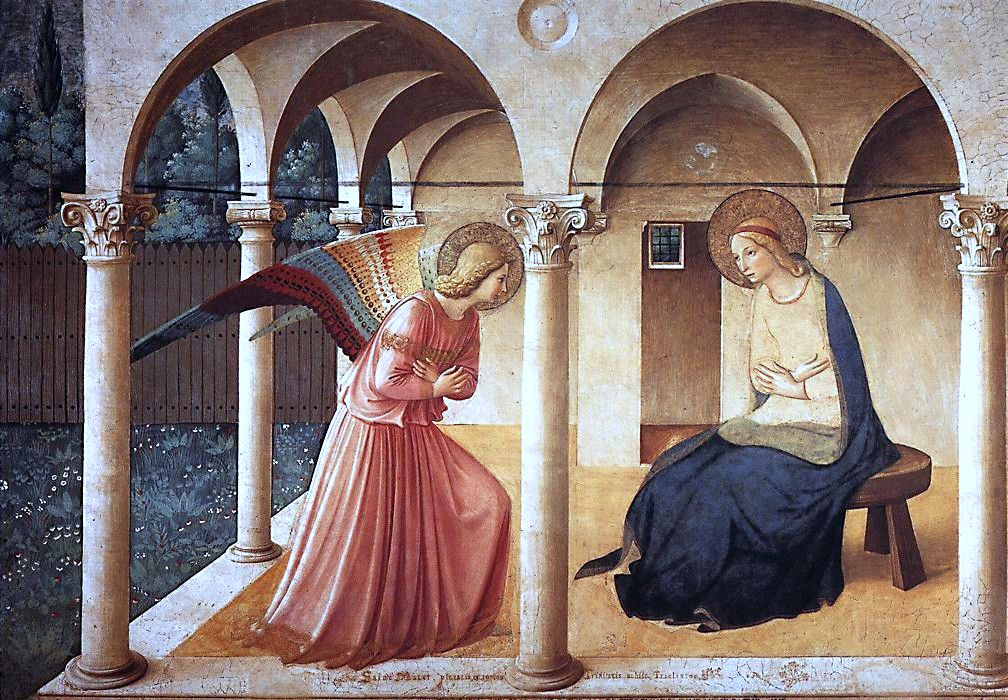
Fra Angelico, The Annunciation, 1437–1446

The classical erotes or putto re-appeared in art during the Italian Renaissance in both religious and mythological art, and is often known in English as a cherub, the singular of cherubim, actually one of the higher ranks in the Christian angelic hierarchy. They normally appear in groups and are generally given wings in religious art, and are sometimes represented as just a winged head. They generally are just in attendance, except that they may be amusing Christ or John the Baptist as infants in scenes of the Holy Family.

The classic example of Renaissance art showing Erotes is the depiction of Eros and Cupid. In the Greek mythology, Eros and his Roman counterpart Cupid, are winged and have arrows they use to manipulate people to fall in love.

=== Victorian art ===
In the late 19th century artists' model Jane Burden Morris came to embody an ideal of beauty for Pre-Raphaelite painters. With the use of her long dark hair and features made somewhat more androgynous, they created a prototype Victorian angel which would appear in paintings and stained glass windows. Roger Homan notes that Edward Burne-Jones and others used her image often and in different ways, creating a new type of angel.

=== Modern art ===
Angels continued to be depicted in the 20th century. One example is the large mosaic mural Angels of the Heavenly Host in St Paul's, Bow Common, created during 1963–68 by Charles Lutyens.

== Islamic art ==
Angel in a Mughal miniature, in the style of Bukhara, 16th century

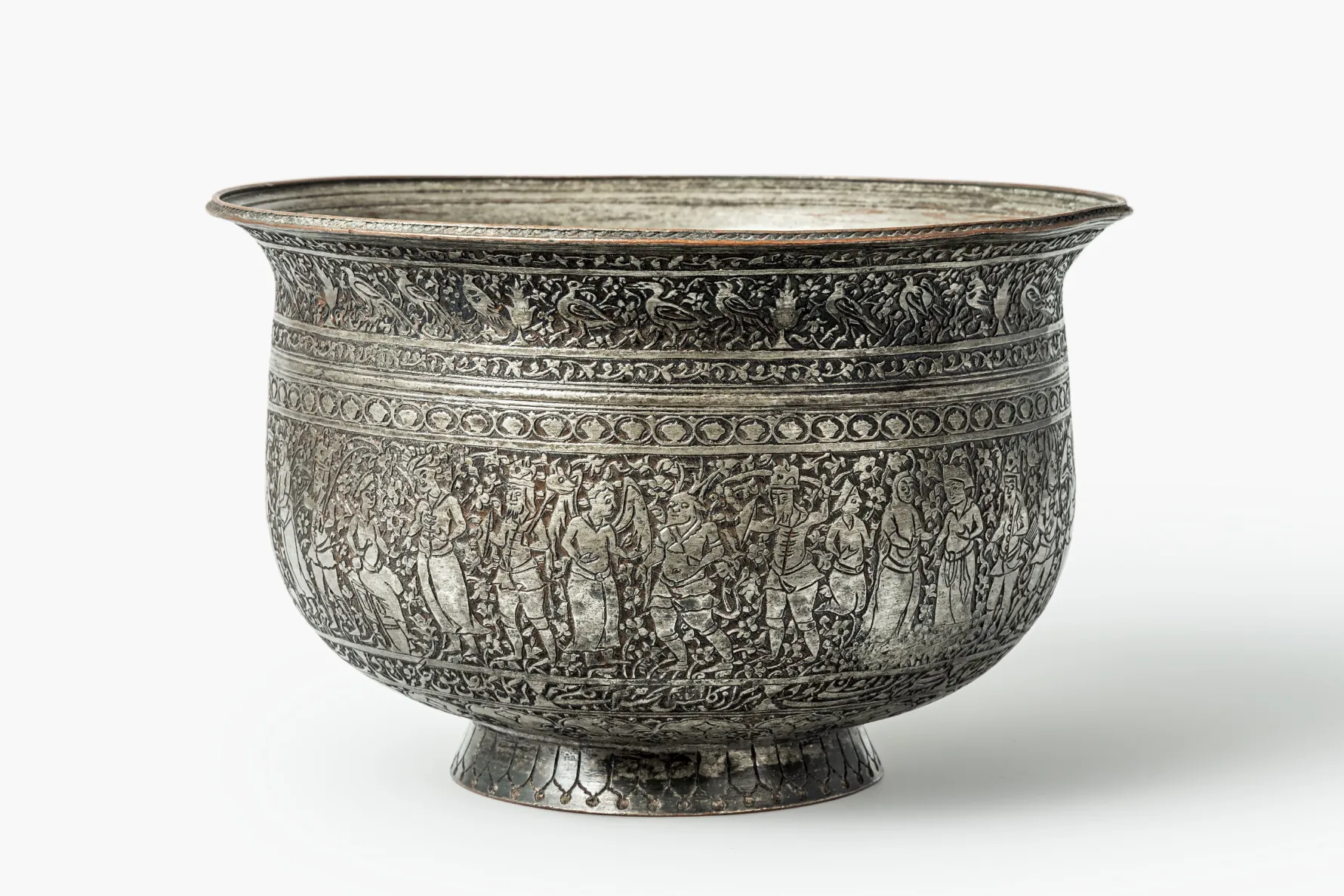
Bowl with humans, angels, and dīv (horned demons). Iran Qajar dynasty, 1215-1221 A.H. (1800-1805). Museum für Kunst und Gewerbe Hamburg, Germany.

Angels in Islamic art often appear in illustrated manuscripts of Muhammad's life. Other common depictions of angels in Islamic art include angels with Adam and Eve in the Garden of Eden, angels discerning the saved from the damned on the Day of Judgement, and angels as a repeating motif in borders or textiles. Islamic depictions of angels resemble winged Christian angels, although Islamic angels are typically shown with multicolored wings. Angels, such as the archangel Gabriel, are typically depicted as masculine, which is consistent with God's rejection of feminine depictions of angels in several verses of Quran. Nevertheless, later depictions of angels in Islamic art are more feminine and androgynous.

=== Angels in manuscripts ===
The 13th-century book Ajā'ib al-makhlūqāt wa gharā'ib al-mawjūdāt (The Wonders of Creation) by Zakariya al-Qazwini describes Islamic angelology, and is often illustrated with many images of angels. The angels are typically depicted with bright, vivid colors, giving them unusual liveliness and other-worldly translucence. While some angels are referred to as "Guardians of the Kingdom of God," others are associated with hell. An undated manuscript of The Wonders of Creation from the Bavarian State Library in Munich includes depictions of angels both alone and alongside humans and animals. Angels are also illustrated in Timurid and Ottoman manuscripts, such as The Timurid Book of the Prophet Muhammad’s Ascension (Mir‘ajnama) and the Siyer-i Nebi.

==== Angels in heaven and hell ====
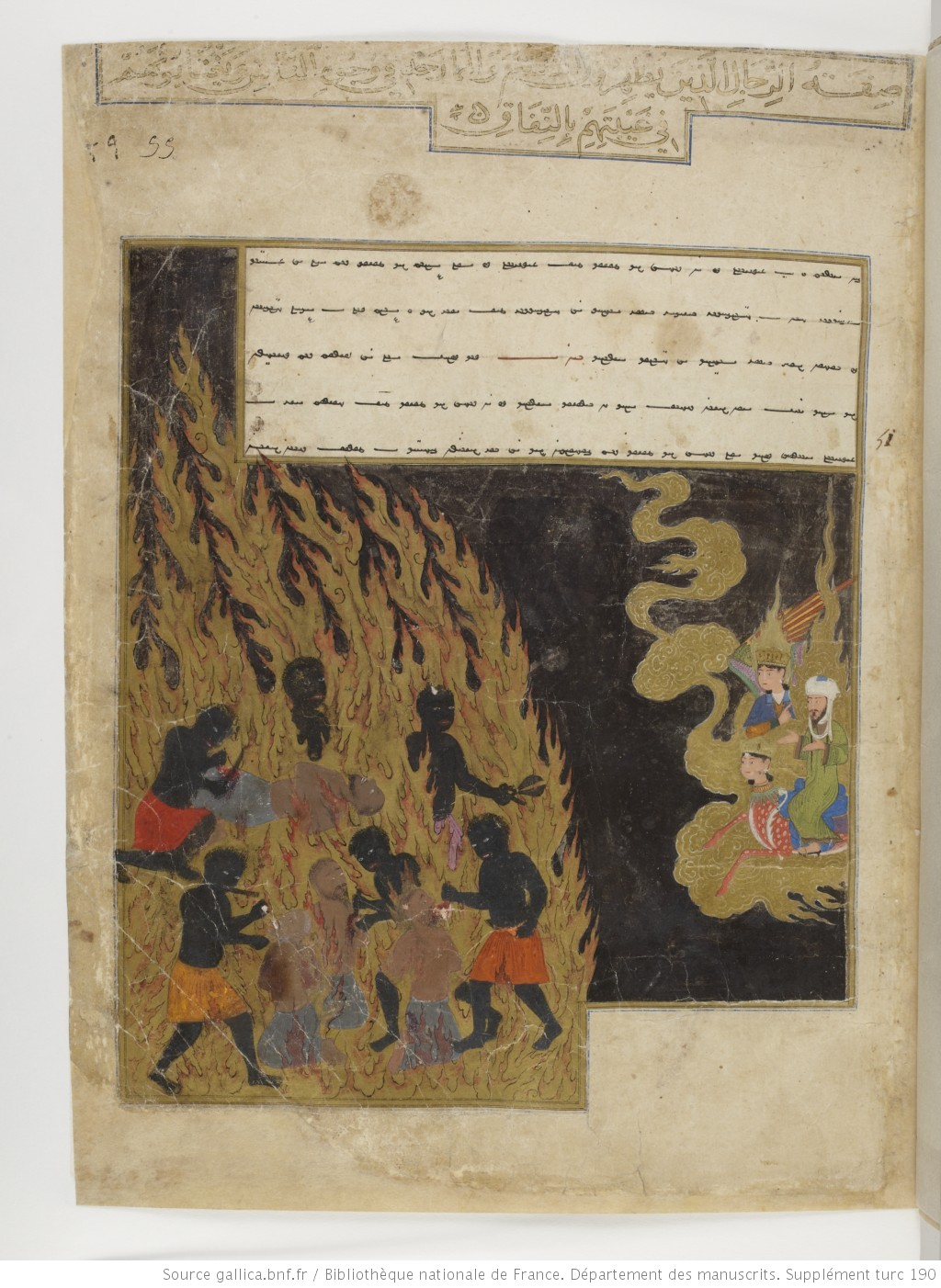
Zabaniya and the punishment of hypocrites (cutting of flesh) from The Timurid Book of the Prophet Muhammad’s Ascension, c. 1436.

The Qur’an makes multiple references to angels. These angels take on both active and passive roles in Quranic stories. In the story of the creation of Adam, God announces to the angels that he intends to create man. The angels act as witnesses to this announcement and subsequent creation of Adam. Although there are many versions of the story, Islamic sources relate that God used the creation of Adam as a punishment or test for the angels. Therefore, the role of angels is often described as in opposition to man.

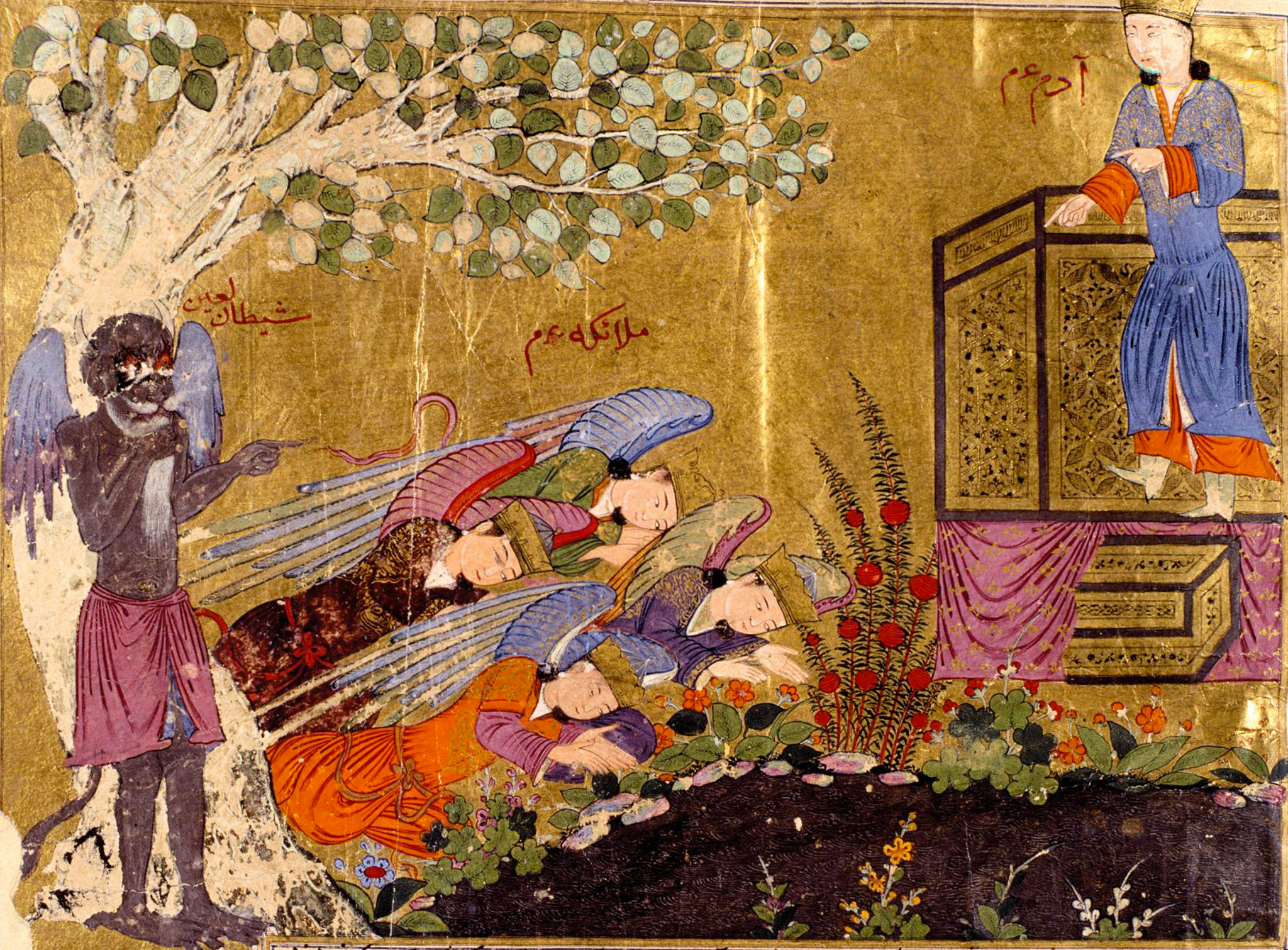
Manuscript subsection illustrating the Annals of al-Tabari depicting Iblis, the angels and Adam. Topkapı Sarayı in Istanbul.

Another angel-like creature mentioned in the Qu’ran (4:97, 32:11) is the zabāniya. A zabāniya is a black angel of hell that brings souls of sinners down to hell to punish them and can be seen in illustrations of The Timurid Book of the Prophet Muhammad’s Ascension (c. 1436 A.D.). There are nineteen zabāniya, led by Mālik, an angel considered to be the master of fire or the gatekeeper of hell. Mālik's and zabāniya's categorizations as angels are debated as some believe they are better described as spirits or demons. Actually, portrayal of Zabaniyya shares many traits characteristical for demons in Islamic arts. As seen in The Timurid Book of the Prophet Muhammad’s Ascension, Muhammad is greeted by Mālik and later witnesses the torture of sinners carried out by the zabāniya.

Similar, the fallen angel Iblis is shown during his moment of refusal to prostrate himself before the newly created Adam, leading to his banishment to the bottom of hell. He is depicted as a black-skinned monstrous creature with horns and flaming eyes, in contrast to the presentation of the noble angels. Only his wings remain as a sign of his former angelic status, however with burned edges.

==== Angels associated with Muhammad ====
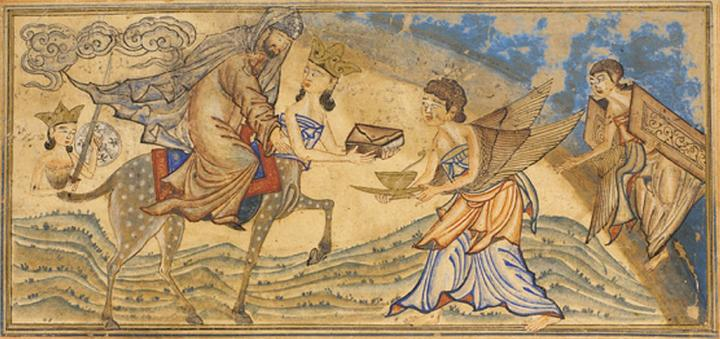
Muhammad beside al-Buraq, which holds a closed book in its hands while its tail appears to transform into an angel wielding a shield and a sword, is approached by two angels, one of whom holds a gold cup on a platter from Jami' al-Tawarikh (The Compendium of Chronicles), c. 1307.

Although depictions of Muhammad are often forbidden, the few that exist often include images of angels. Specifically, the Archangel Gabriel is frequently shown alongside Muhammad. For example, in The Timurid Book of the Prophet Muhammad’s Ascension, the Archangel Gabriel appears to Muhammad in Mecca to announce his ascension. Kneeling before Muhammad, Gabriel is shown with colorful wings and a crown. Later in The Timurid Book, Muhammad is shown with Gabriel meeting a group of angels in heaven. In the Jami' al-tawarikh, a Persian history from the 14th century, Muhammad is depicted beside al-Buraq, whose tail is transformed into an angel, while two other angels approach. A 16th-century Ottoman manuscript of Siyer-i Nebi, a Turkish epic about the life of Muhammad, also includes many depictions of Muhammad alongside angels.

== Jewish art ==
Mainstream Rabbinic Judaism discourages focus from being placed on angels due to fears about idolatry and a desire to curtail any inclinations to polytheism. As such, many Jews do not make or display artworks of angels. However, such art does exist, and has been consistently made throughout Rabbinic history, for example as in the Dura Europos synagogue, where wingless humanoid angels dressed like Persians appear, as well as winged humanoids. Overall, if angel art is popular in a time and place, there will be Jewish art that depicts angels as well. Contemporary resistance and ignorance regarding angels in Judaism, and specifically in Jewish art, may partially stem from the current strong association between angels and Christianity.

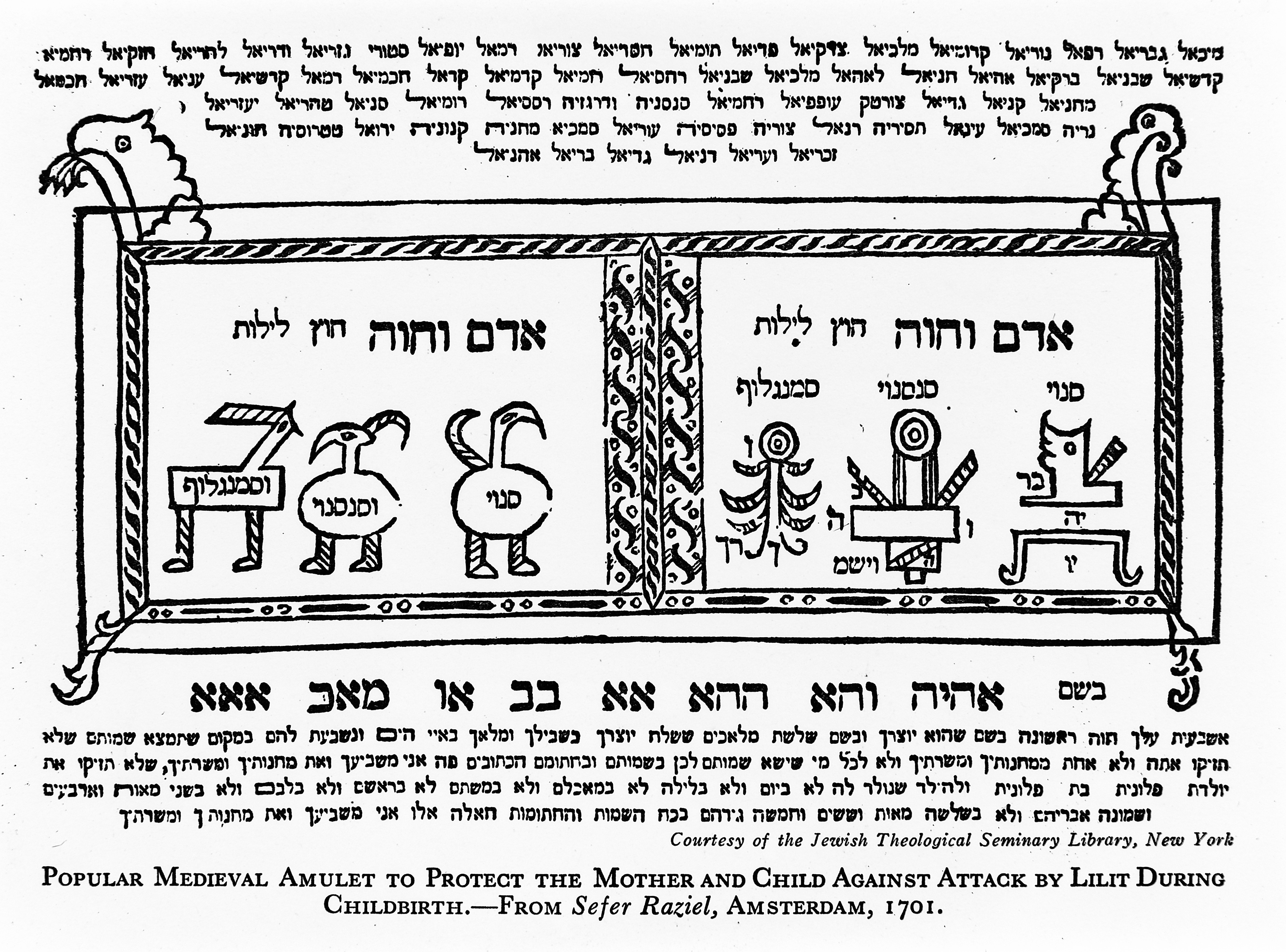
Medieval Jewish amulet designed to ward off Lilith, depicting Senoy, Sansenoy and Semangelof.

Sanoi, Sansoni, and Samanglif (also spelled Senoy, Sansenoy and Semangelof) are three angels that protect newborns. Depictions of them as small, non-human creatures occur on amulets and have had a small resurgence in popularity in recent years. They are associated with the Alphabet of Ben Sira, where they attempt to retrieve Lilith after she flees from Adam. When they cannot, they make her promise not to harm newborns if they are protecting them. The use of their names in amulets for children predates the story, and that was likely intended to explain an existing custom.

Cherubim in their classic Jewish description are typically creatures with features of a human, lion, bird, and cattle in some combination. The variety of imagery here was common in the Ancient Near East, and draws on that of the lamassu. The name cherub may come from that connection. It also draws on the imagery of the sphinx. The descriptions of cherubim overall vary. Similarly, the imagery used for seraphim derives from the uraeus, which appeared in ancient carvings from Judah. It particularly occurred on seals, where it was invoked as a protective symbol.

While winged humanoid angels are strongly associated with Christianity, some academics argue that rather than Judaism occasionally adopting this imagery from Christianity, Christianity adopted it from Judaism. In text, humanoid beings with wings and no other unusual features appear as early as the writing of Zechariah 5:5–11. The most common wings are feathered, but occasionally winged humanoid angels in Jewish art have been depicted with butterfly wings. Winged angels are sometimes also depicted with halos.

Angels are sometimes depicted as birds without human features.

Humanoid angels appear in Ethiopian Jewish art traditions, which are traditionally non-Rabbinic.

Many well-known pop culture depictions of angels in the West come from the work of Jewish writers.

== Precursors ==
=== Assyrian ===
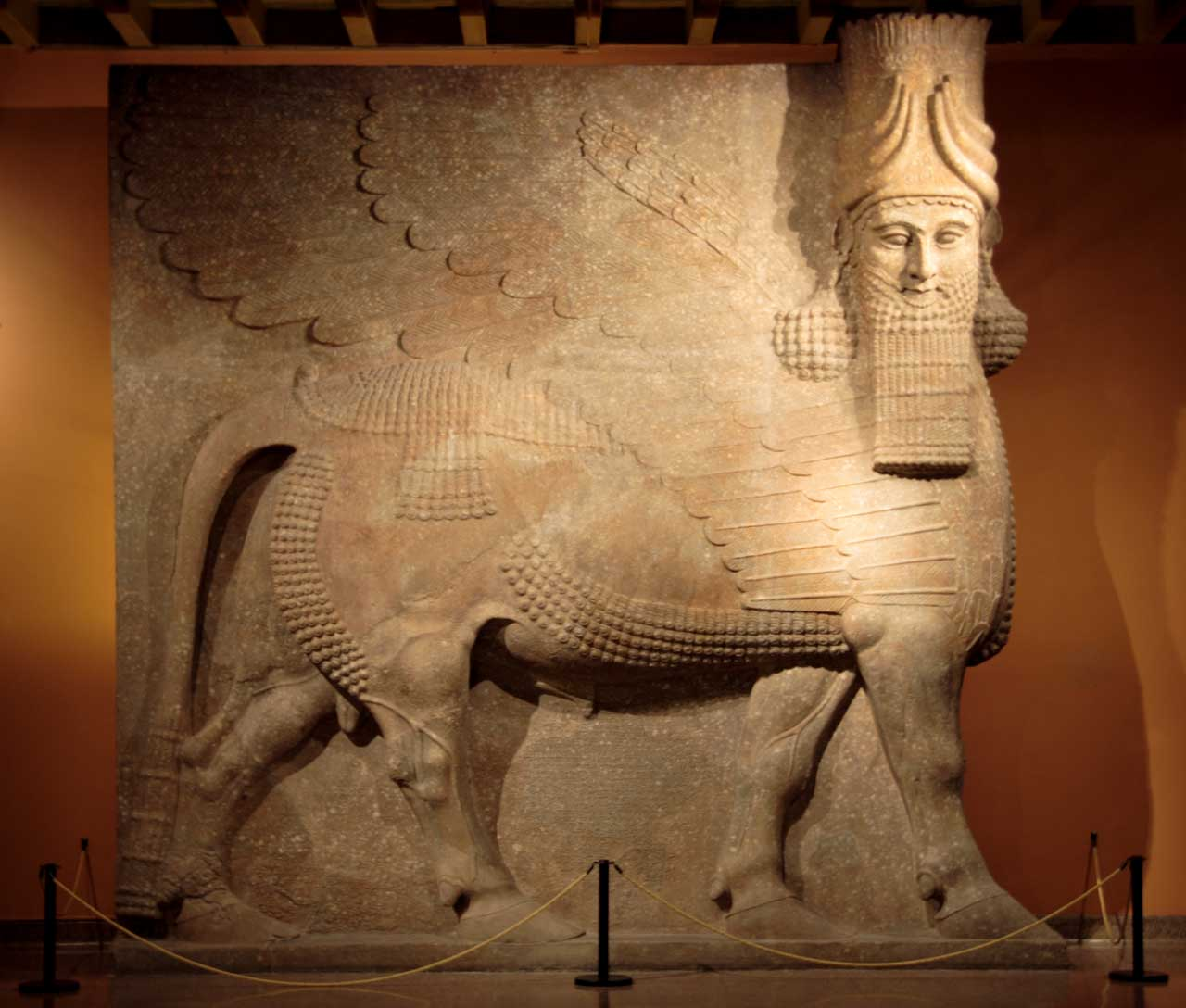
Lamassu, Neo-Assyrian Empire, c. 721–705 BC

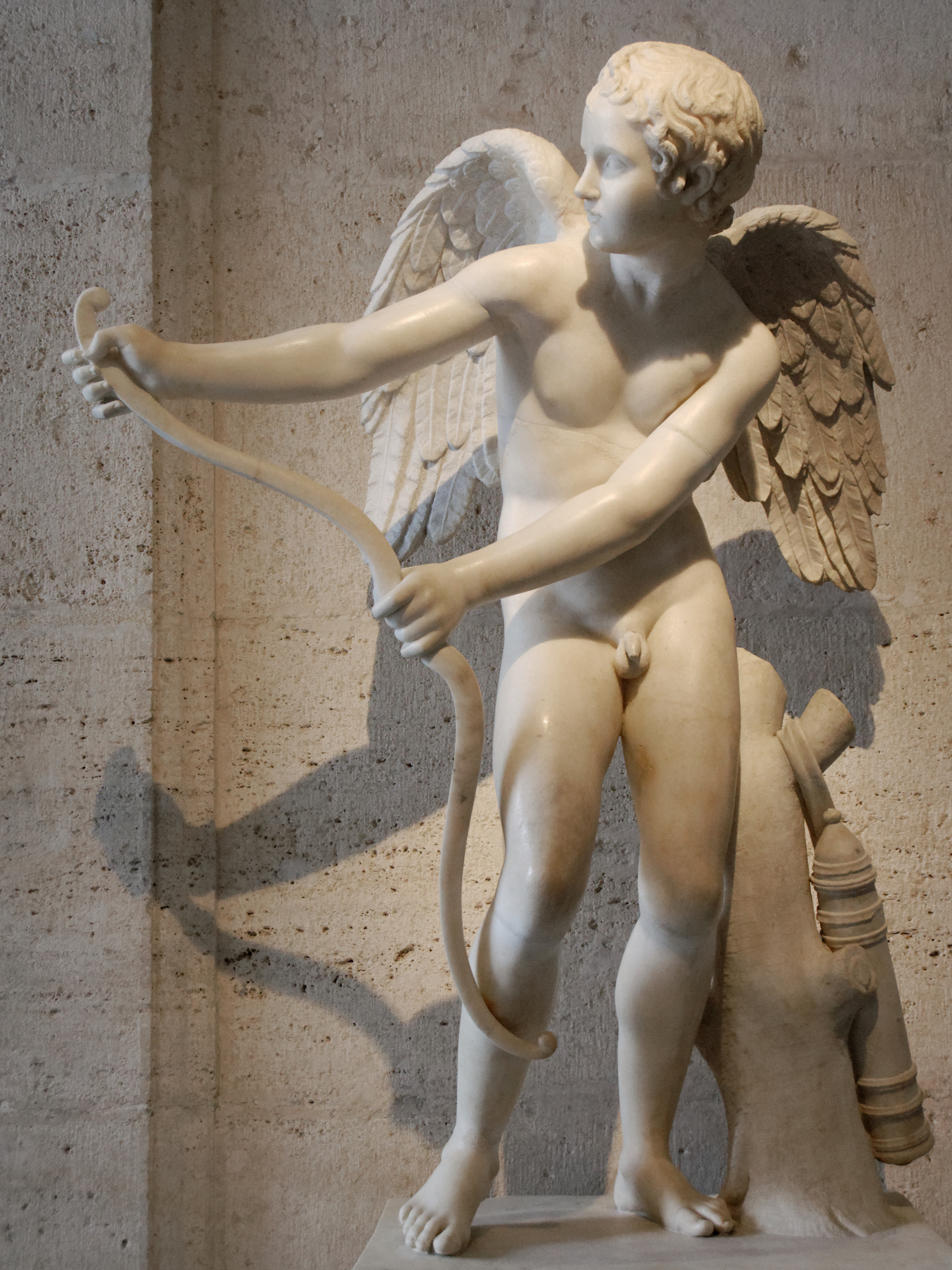
Eros bow Musei Capitolini MC410

The use of winged angels in art spans several millennia and cuts across multiple cultures, with each culture associating these ethereal figures with various aspects. For instance, in the ancient Assyrian culture, there was a protective deity labelled lamassu. A lamassu is a hybrid figure that contains part human on the head, part bovine lion on the body, and enormous wings with feathers, completing the bird aspect of the deity.

=== Ancient Greece ===
Ancient Greek mythology has been an integral part of art, serving as an inspiration to a large number of concepts in art. The culture had a winged figure, Ero, the son of Aphrodite, the goddess of love, who became Cupid in the Roman Empire.

The Greek mythology associates Erotes with love and desire. While they are perceived as heavenly creatures, they contain power that can make a person fall in love based on their enchantments.

The majority of ancient artwork portrayed Eros as being a slender yet well-built man wielding enormous sexual power. While Eros was not a popular figure in the classical period, the arrival of the Hellenistic period raised him back to prominence. The popularization of Erotes arises from the normalization of the Roman counterpart, Cupid, who has a bow and arrow that he uses to make people fall in love. The majority of people who observe Valentine's Day have or utilize stories related to Cupid and Eros.

The classical Erotes or Putto re-appeared in art during the Italian Renaissance in both religious and mythological art, and is often known in English as a cherub, the singular of cherubim, actually one of the higher ranks in the Christian angelic hierarchy. They normally appear in groups and are generally given wings in religious art, and are sometimes represented as just a winged head. They generally are just in attendance, except that they may be amusing Christ or John the Baptist as infants in scenes of the Holy Family

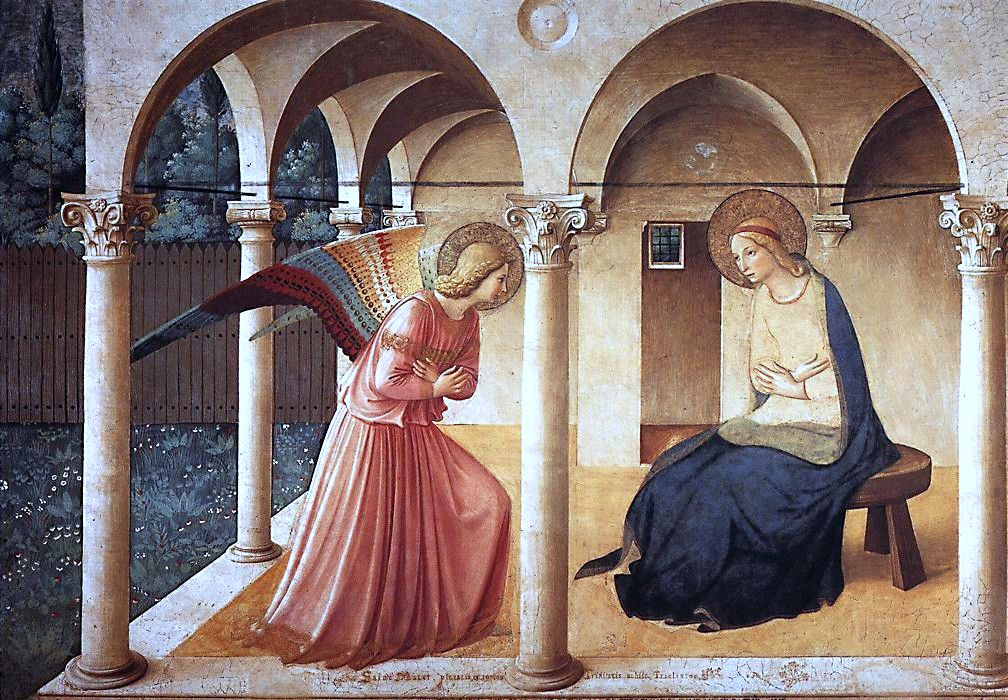
Fra Angelico, The Annunciation, 1437–1446

The Greek mythology associates Erotes with love and desire. While they are perceived as heavenly creatures, they contain power that can make a person fall in love based on their enchantments. According to Greek mythology, Eros was associated with Gaia, mother earth goddess.

The majority of ancient artwork portrayed Eros as being a slender yet well-built man wielding enormous sexual power. While Eros was not a popular figure in the classical period, the arrival of the Hellenistic period raised him back to prominence. The popularization of Erotes arises from the normalization of the Roman counterpart, Cupid, who has a bow and arrow that he uses to make people fall in love. The majority of people who observe Valentines Day have or utilize stories related to Cupid and Eros. Eros or Cupid uses his arrow to manipulate people through the power of love, making his role as a god an intriguing one.

== Gallery of angels in Christian art ==
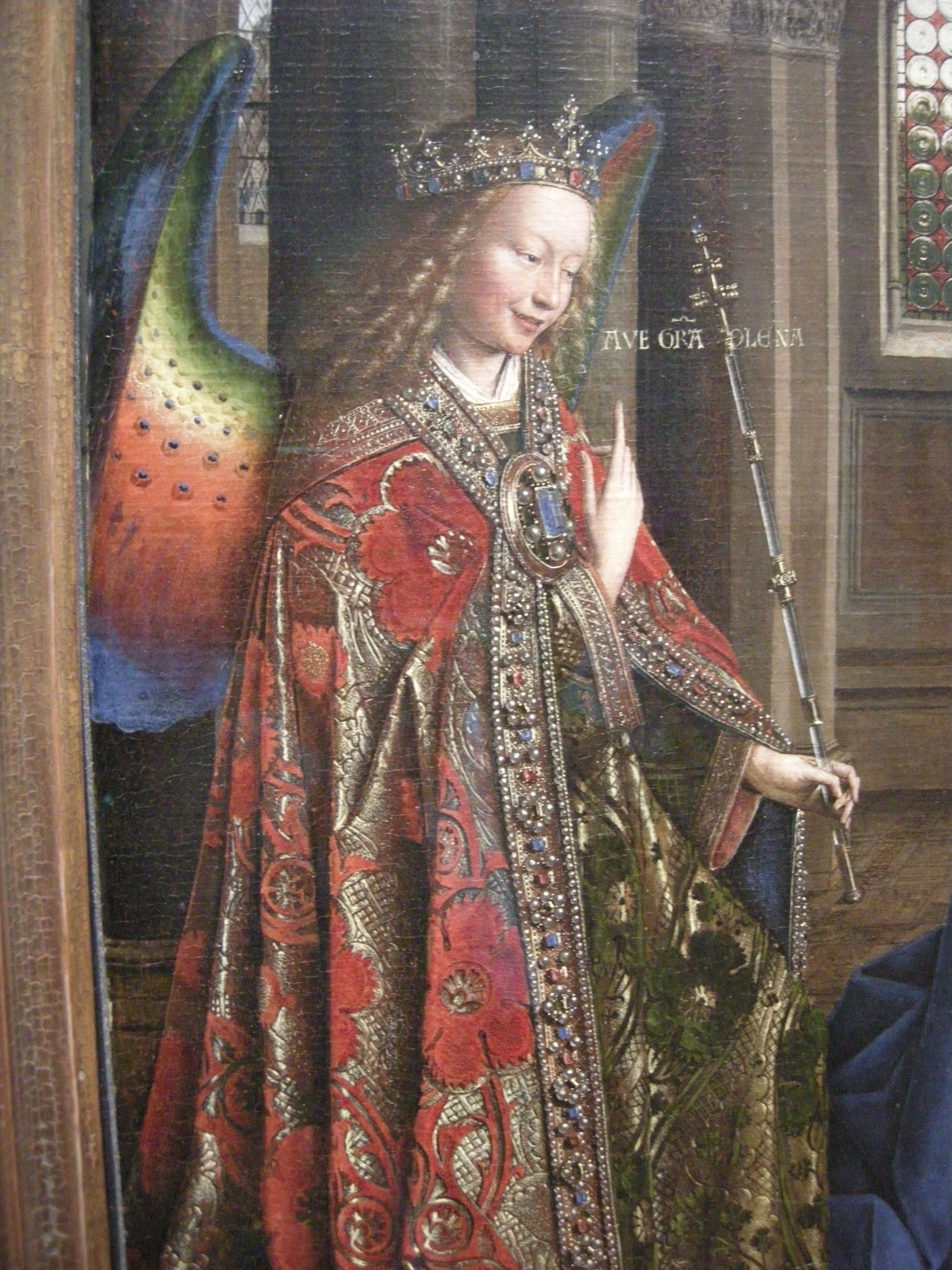
The Archangel Gabriel in a deacon's vestments, and multi-colored wings in Jan van Eyck's Annunciation, 1434–1436

Master of the St Lucy Legend, Mary, Queen of Heaven, c 1480–1510, accompanied by angels, some making music and others investments

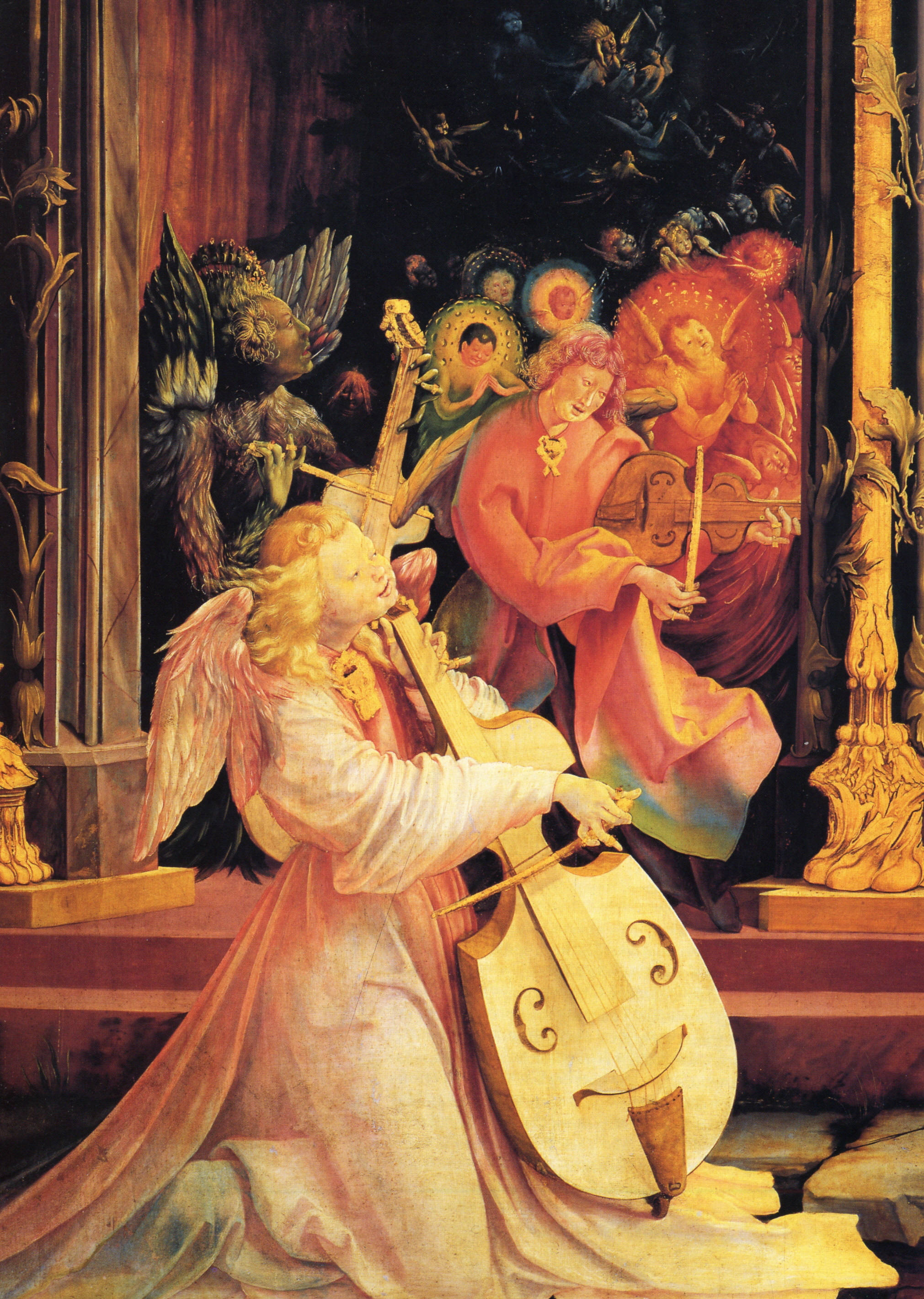
Isenheim Altarpiece by Matthias Grünewald, c. 1512–1616, Concert of Angels (detail), with fallen angels in the background

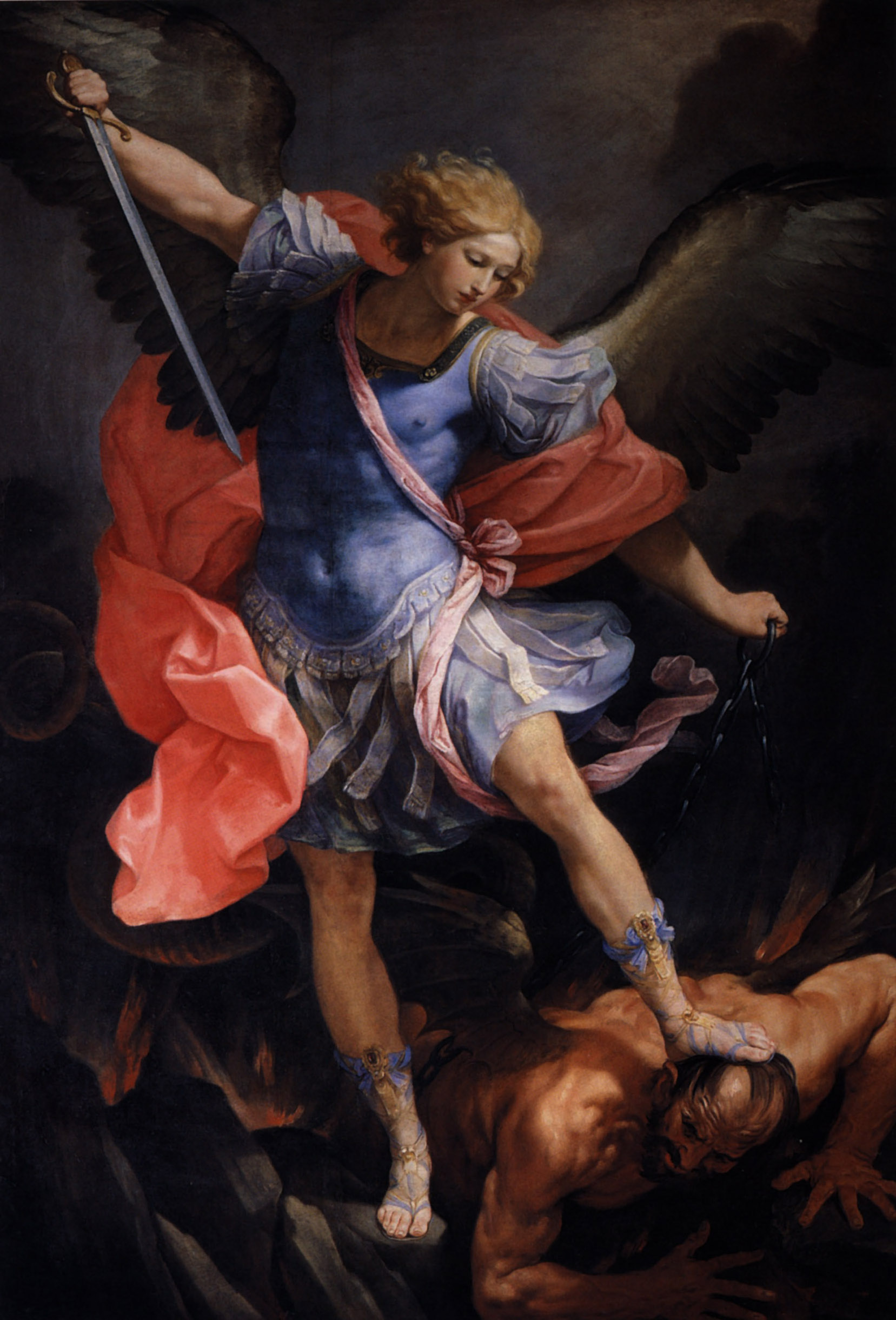
Guido Reni's Michael (in Santa Maria della Concezione church, Rome, 1636) tramples Satan. A mosaic of the same painting decorates St. Michael's Altar in St. Peter's Basilica.

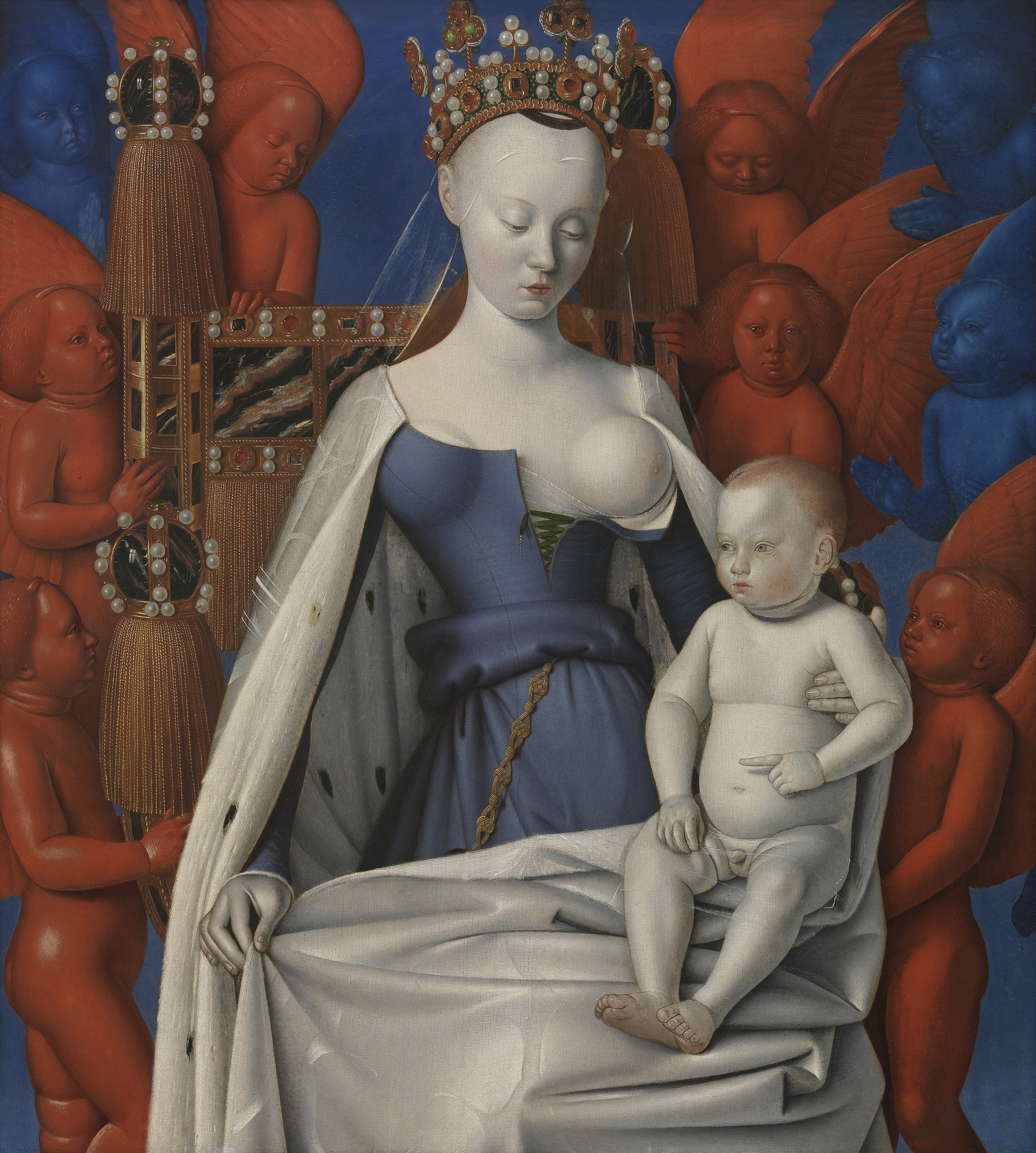
Madonna Surrounded by Seraphim and Cherubim by Jean Fouquet

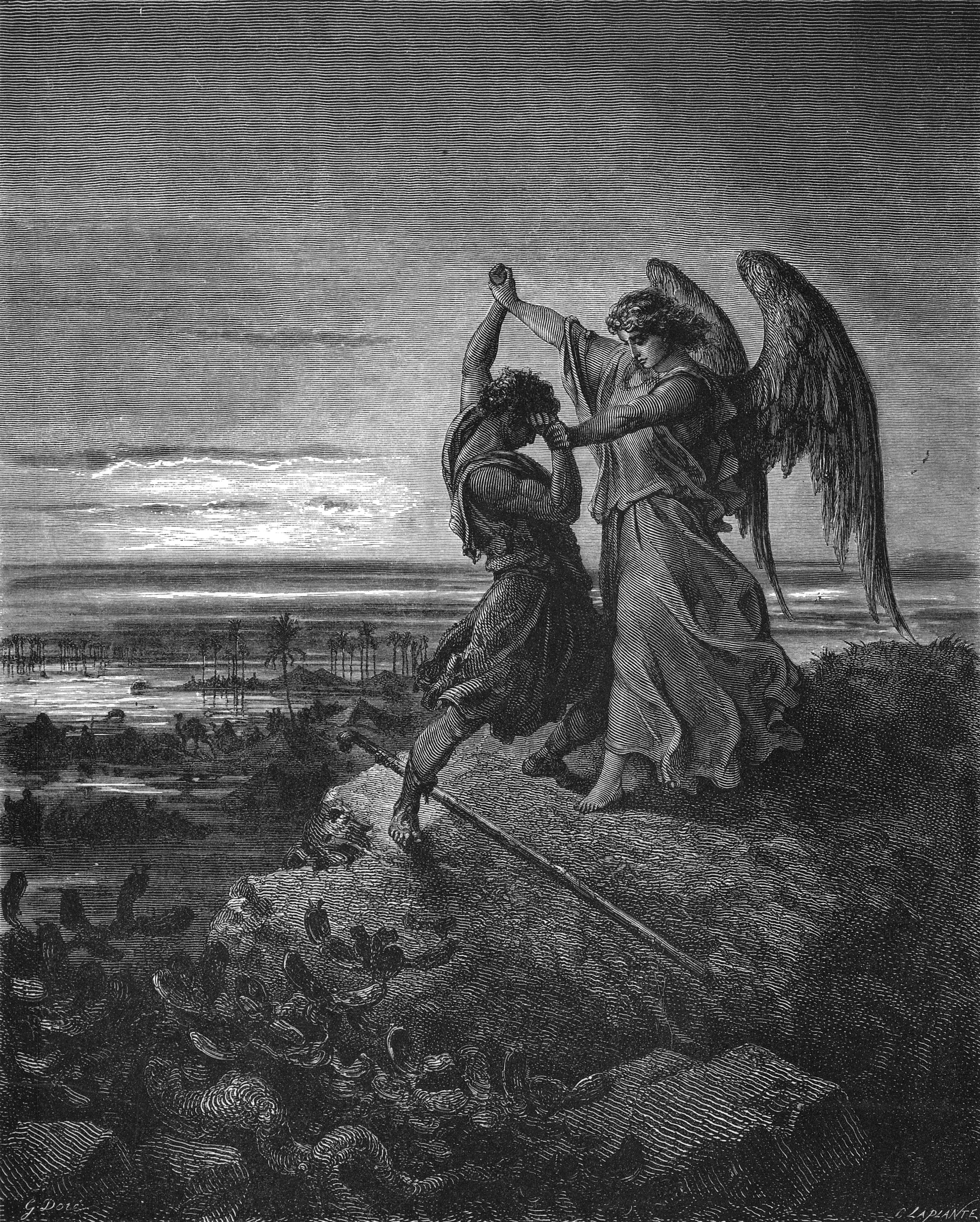
Jacob Wrestling with the Angel by Gustave Doré from La Grande Bible de Tours (1866)

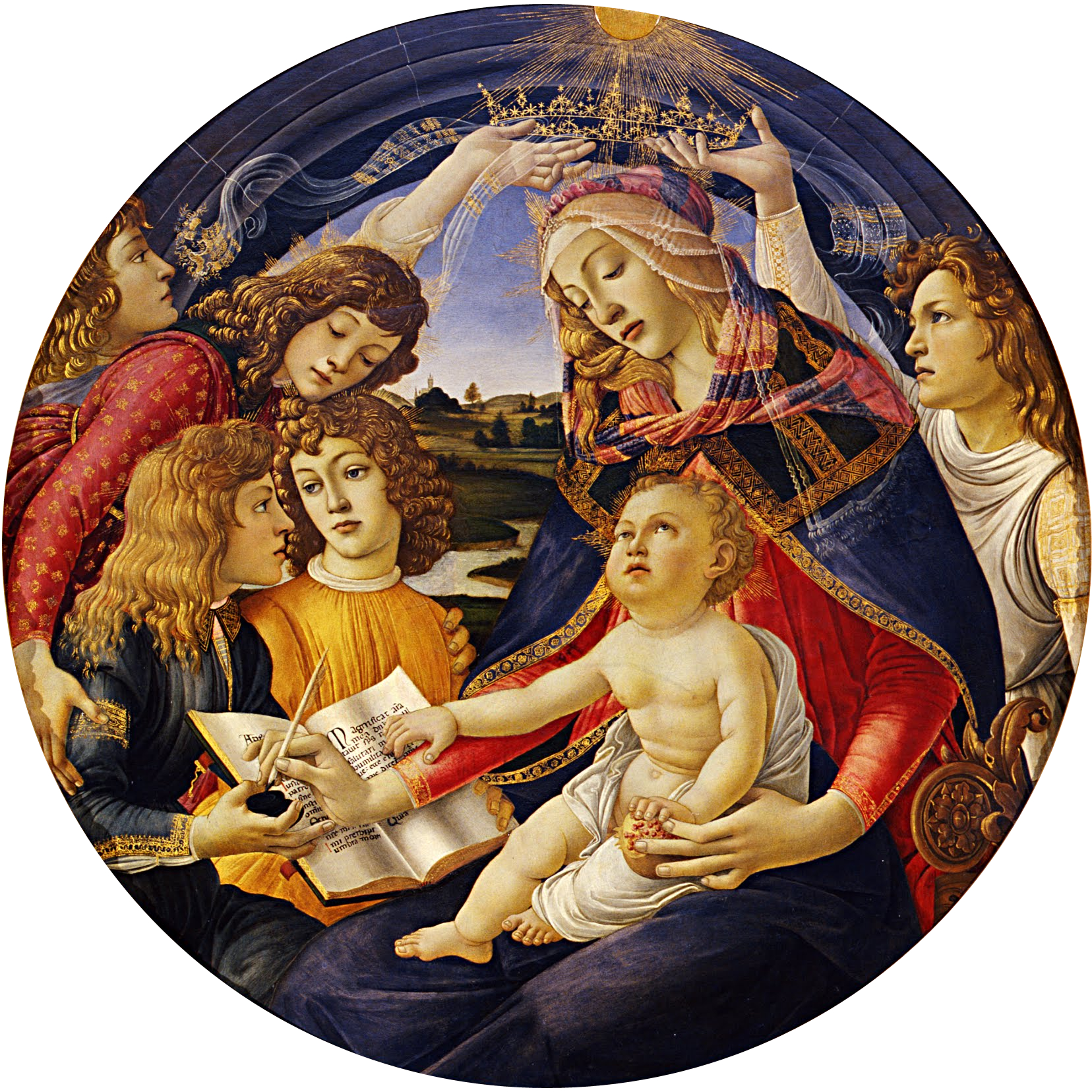
Magnificat Madonna, c. 1483, with wingless angels.

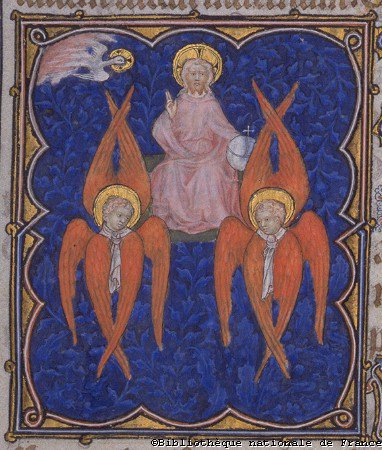
God surrounded by Seraphim (Petites Heures of Jean de France, Duc de Berry)

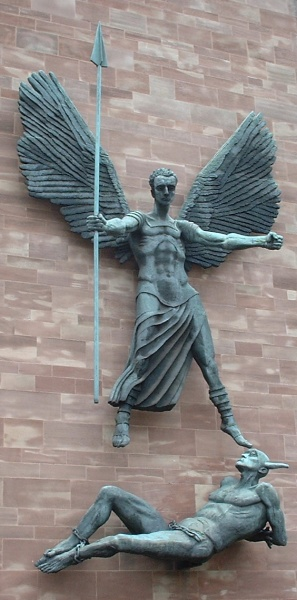
St Michaels Victory over the Devil, a sculpture by Sir Jacob Epstein

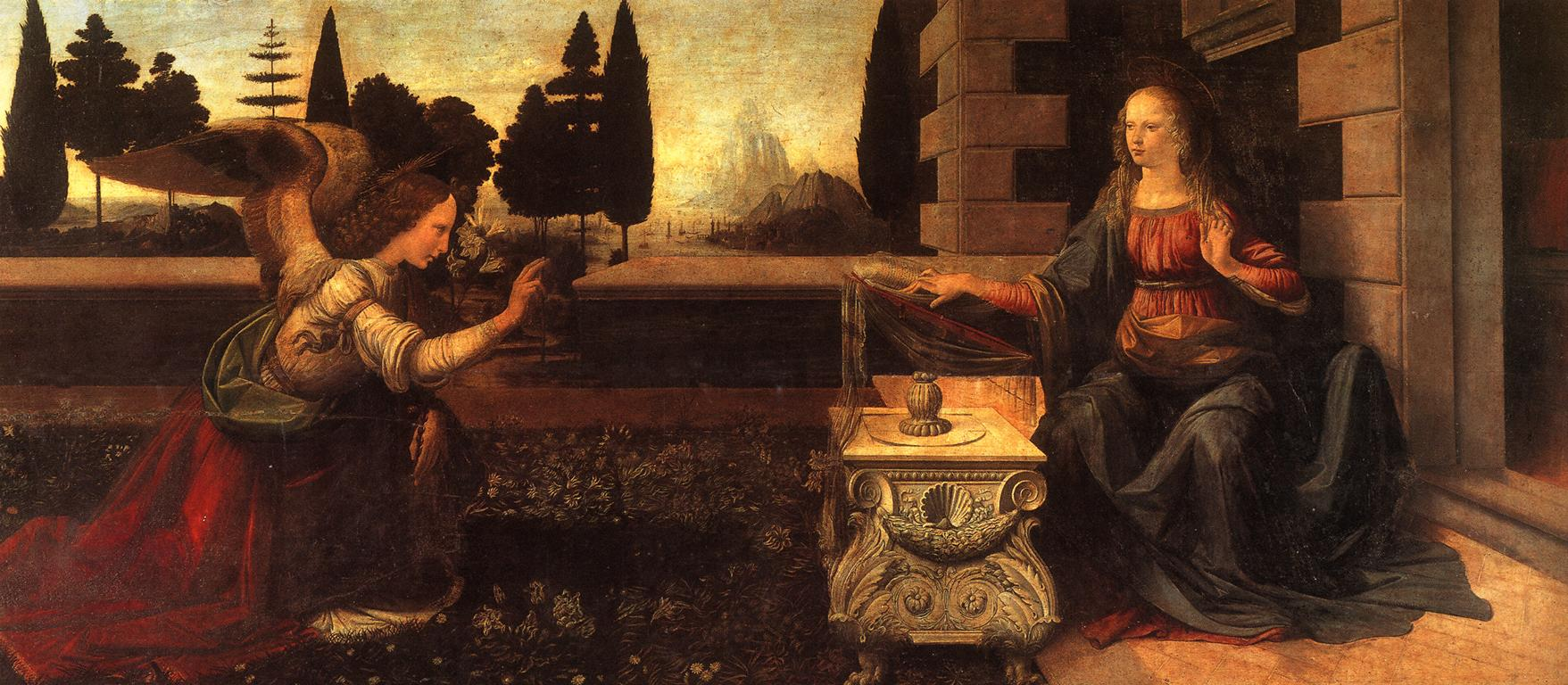
The Annunciation by Leonardo da Vinci, c. 1472–1475

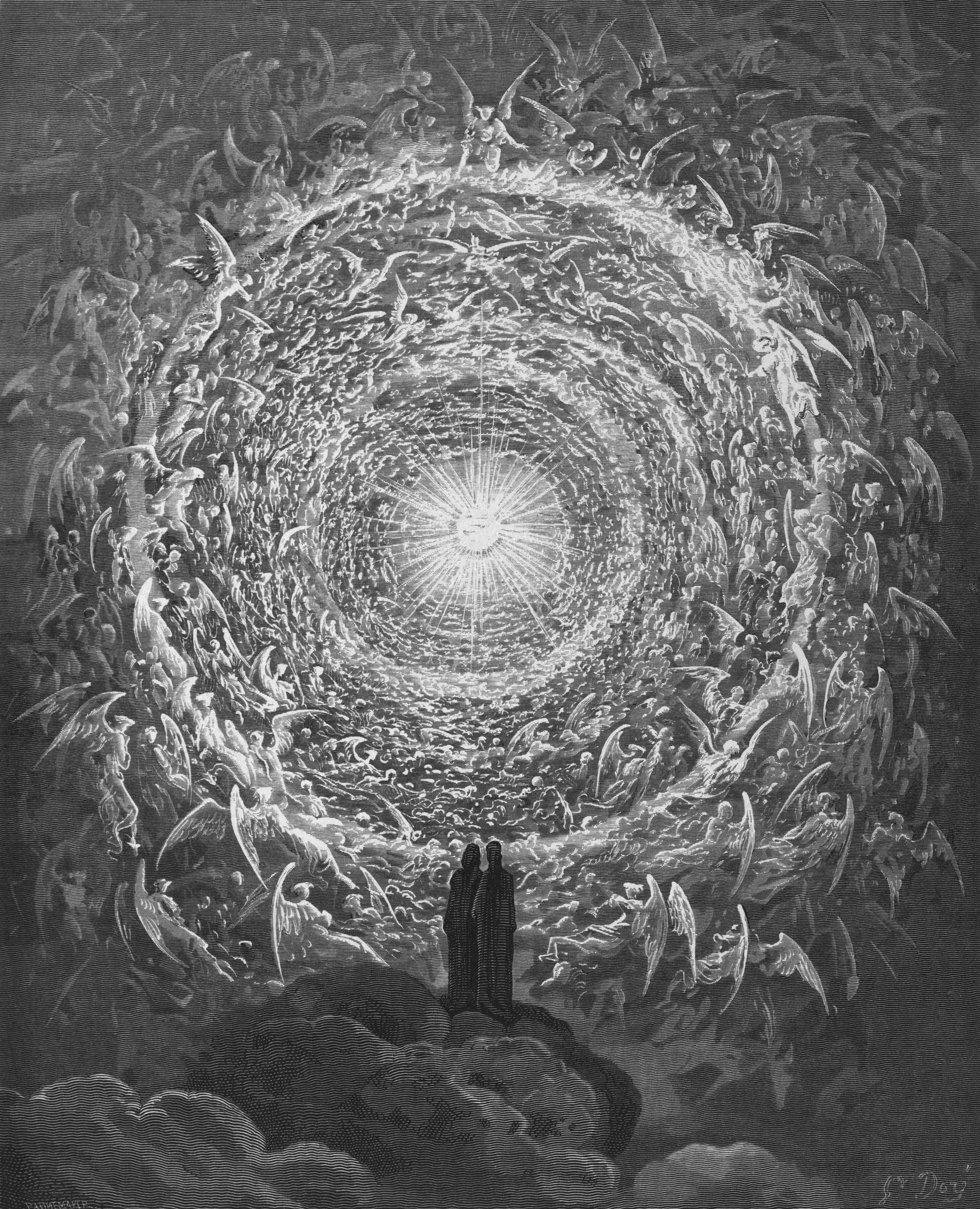
Rosa Celeste: by Gustave Doré

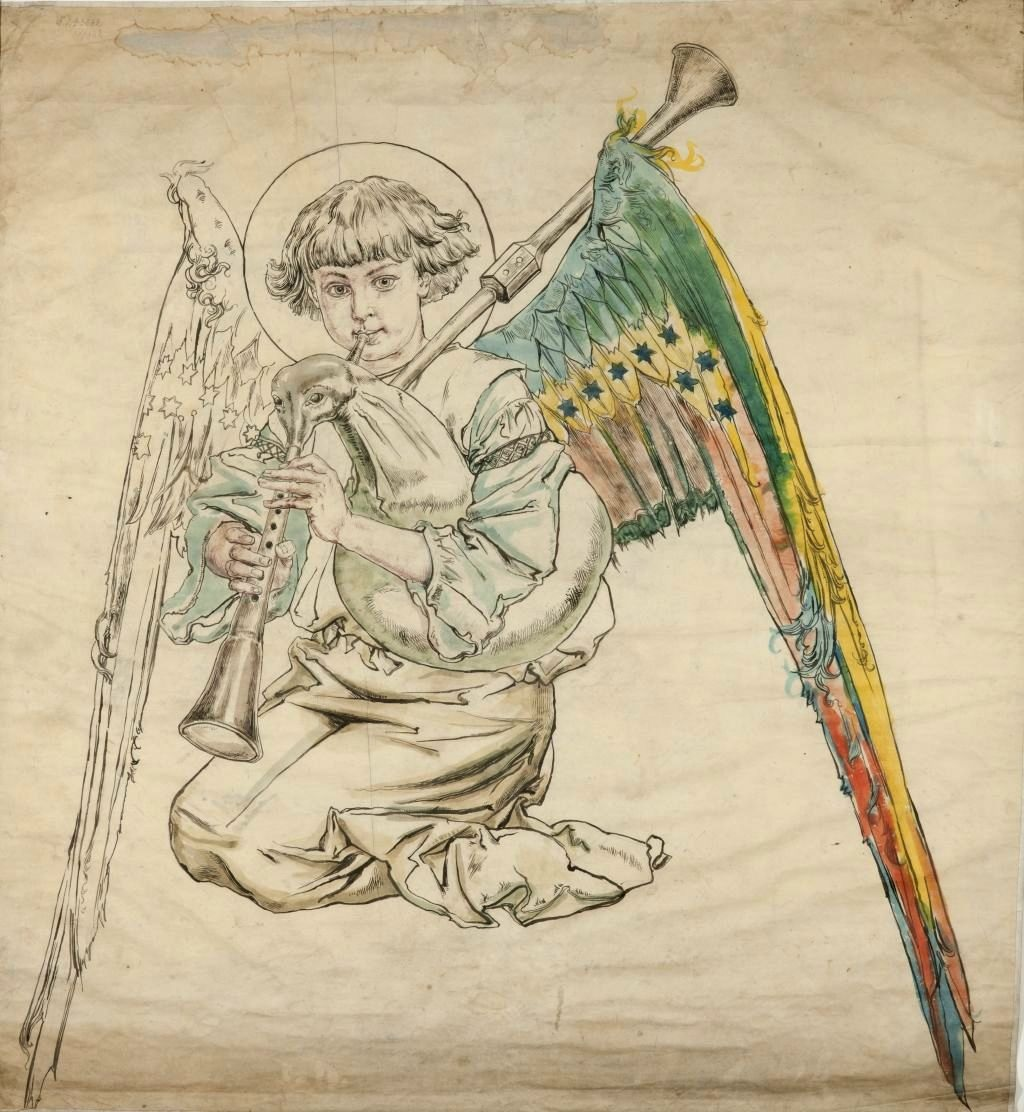
Angel playing bagpipes, by Jan Matejko

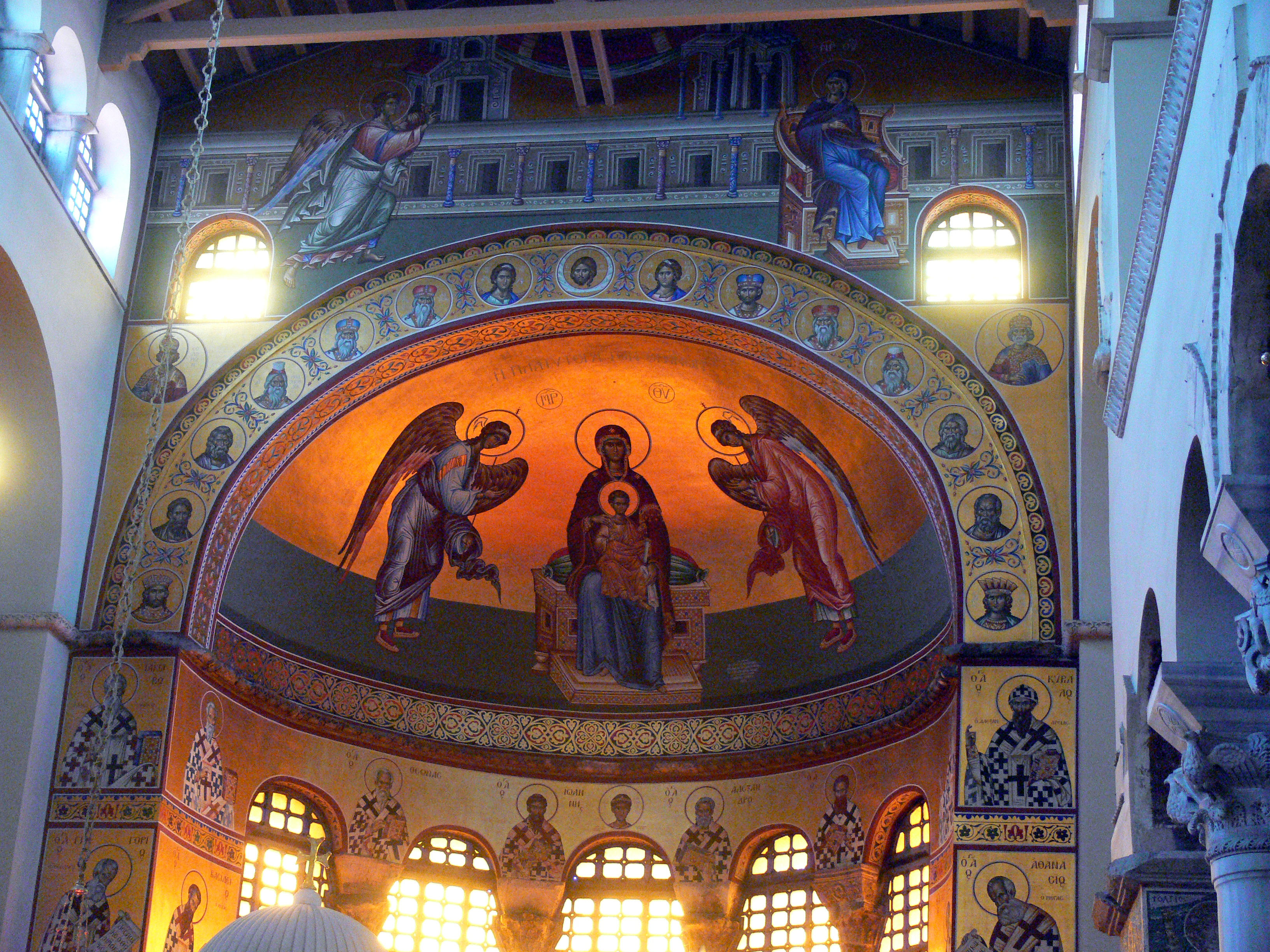
Church of Saint Demetrius Patron Saint of Thessaloniki

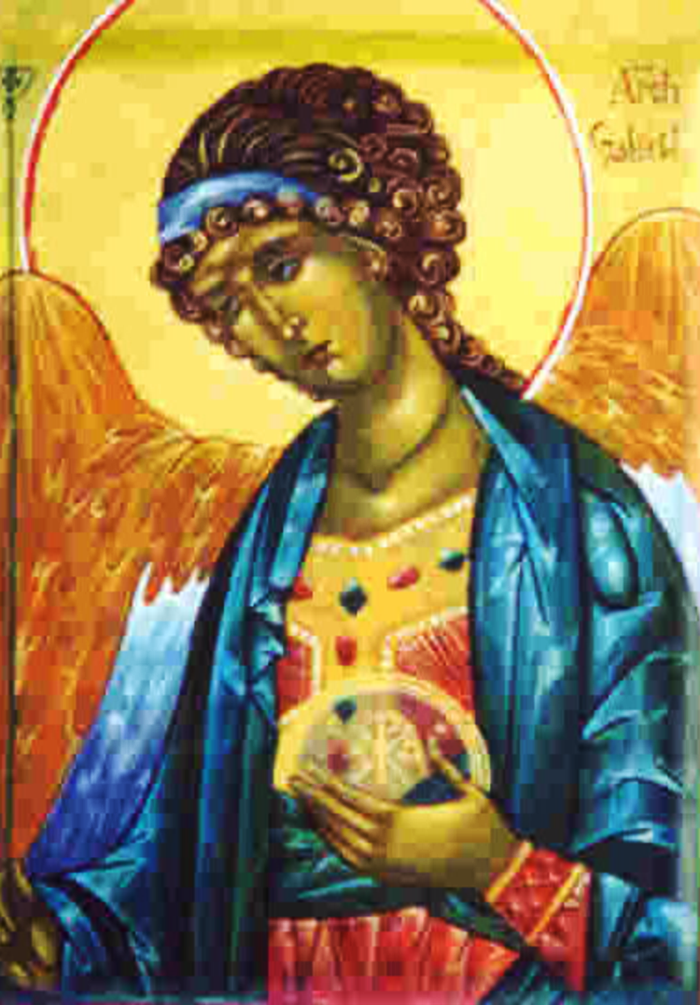
Icon of Archangel Gabriel by Anonymous, c. 13th century

Angel in White by Anonymous, c. 1230, Mileseva Monastery, Republic of Serbia

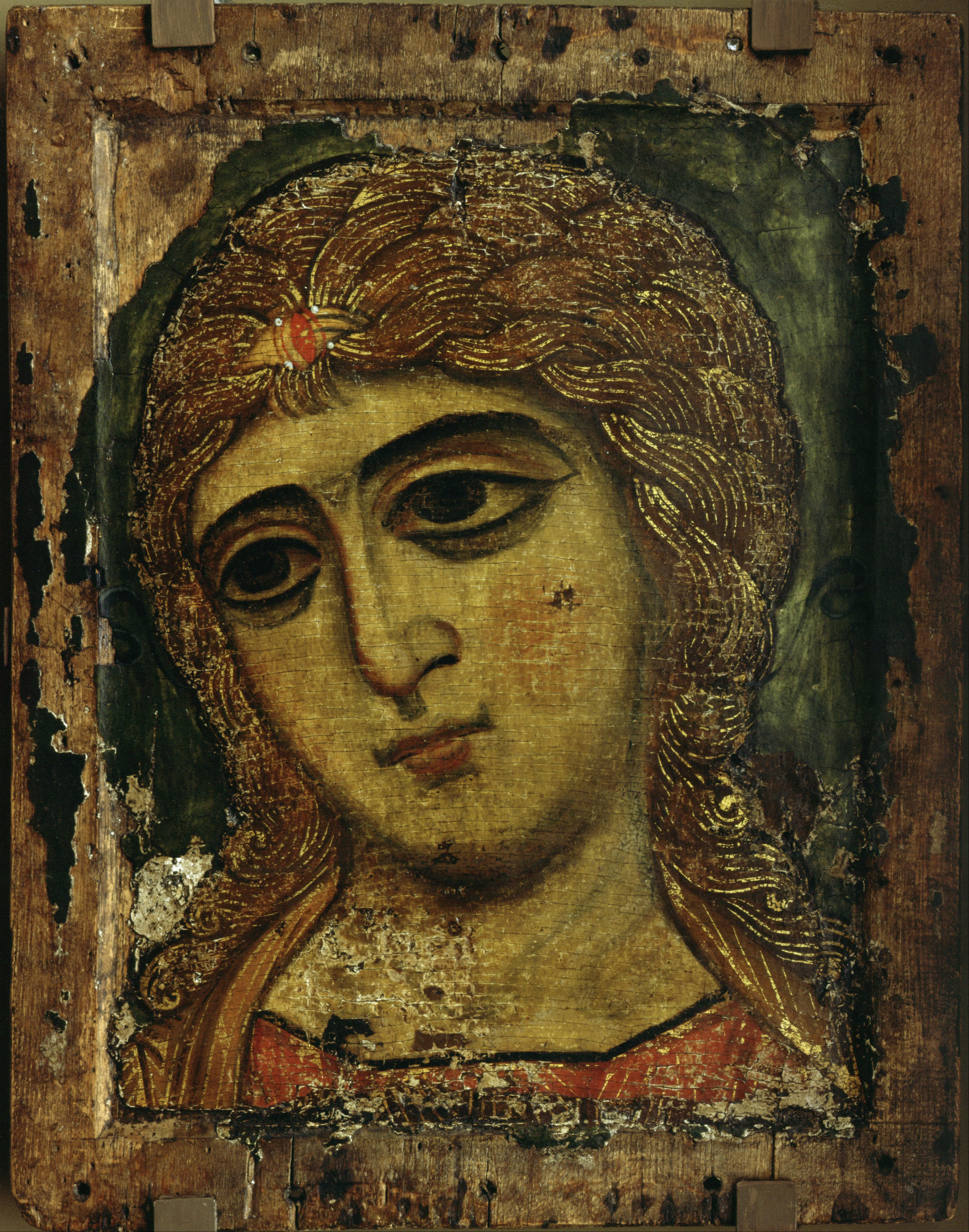
Archangel Gabriel, a tempera icon by an unknown Russian artist, painted in the second half of the 12th century, Russian Museum, Saint Petersburg, Russia

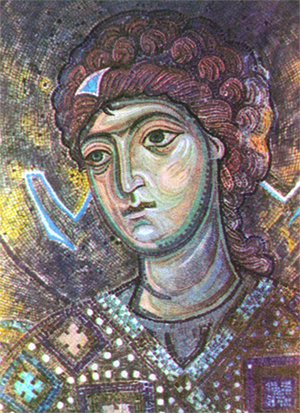
Archangel Gabriel. Part of the mosaic fresco from Gelati Monastery, Georgia c. 12th century

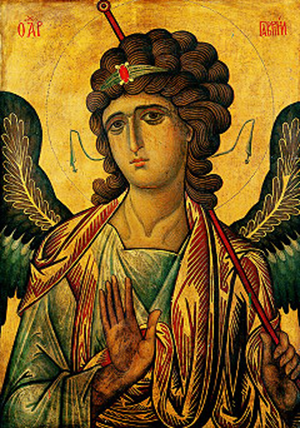
Archangel Gabriel Icon by Anonymous, c. 13th century, Saint Catherine's Monastery, Sinai, Egypt

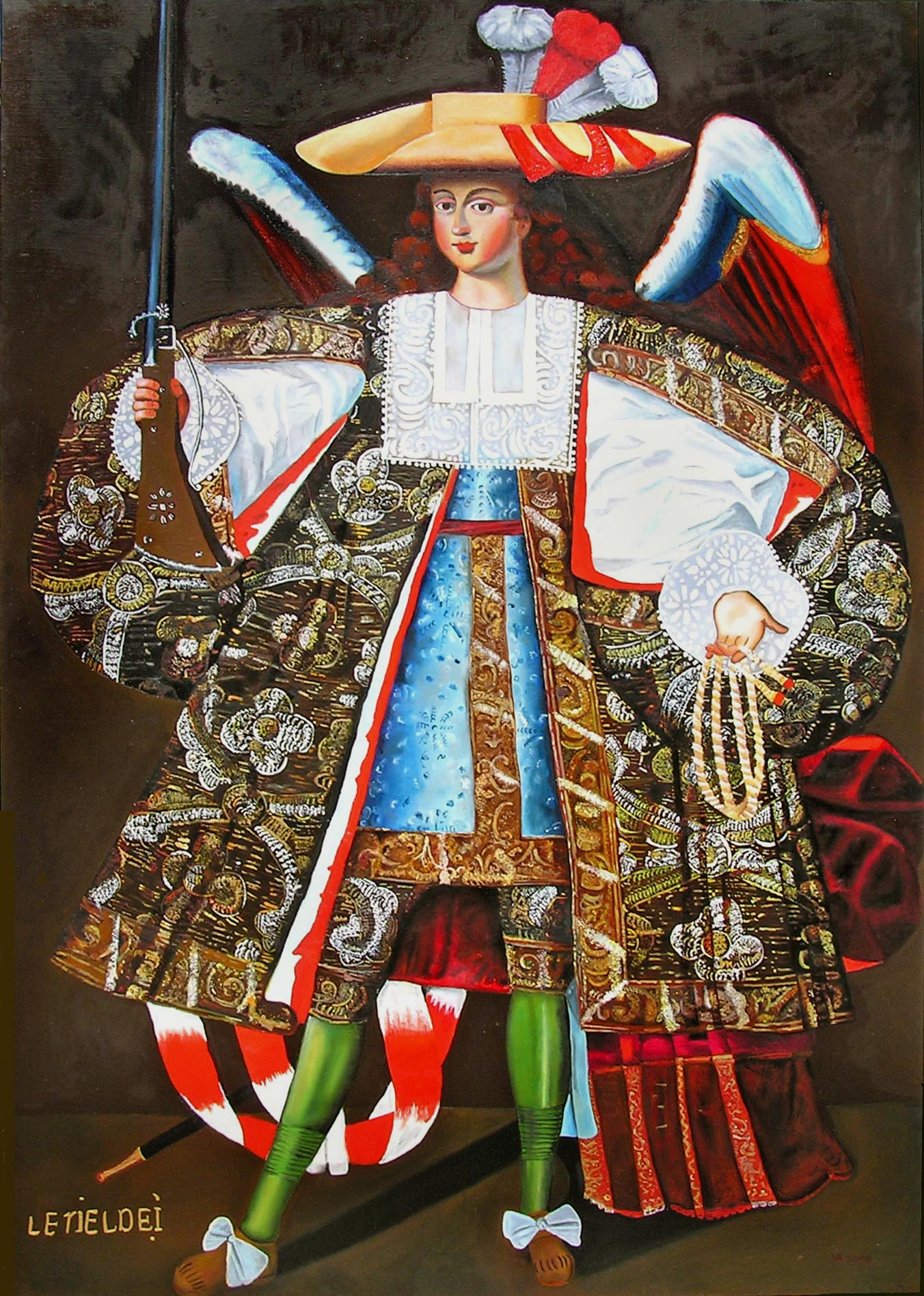
Ángel arcabucero, 17th-century Peru (?)

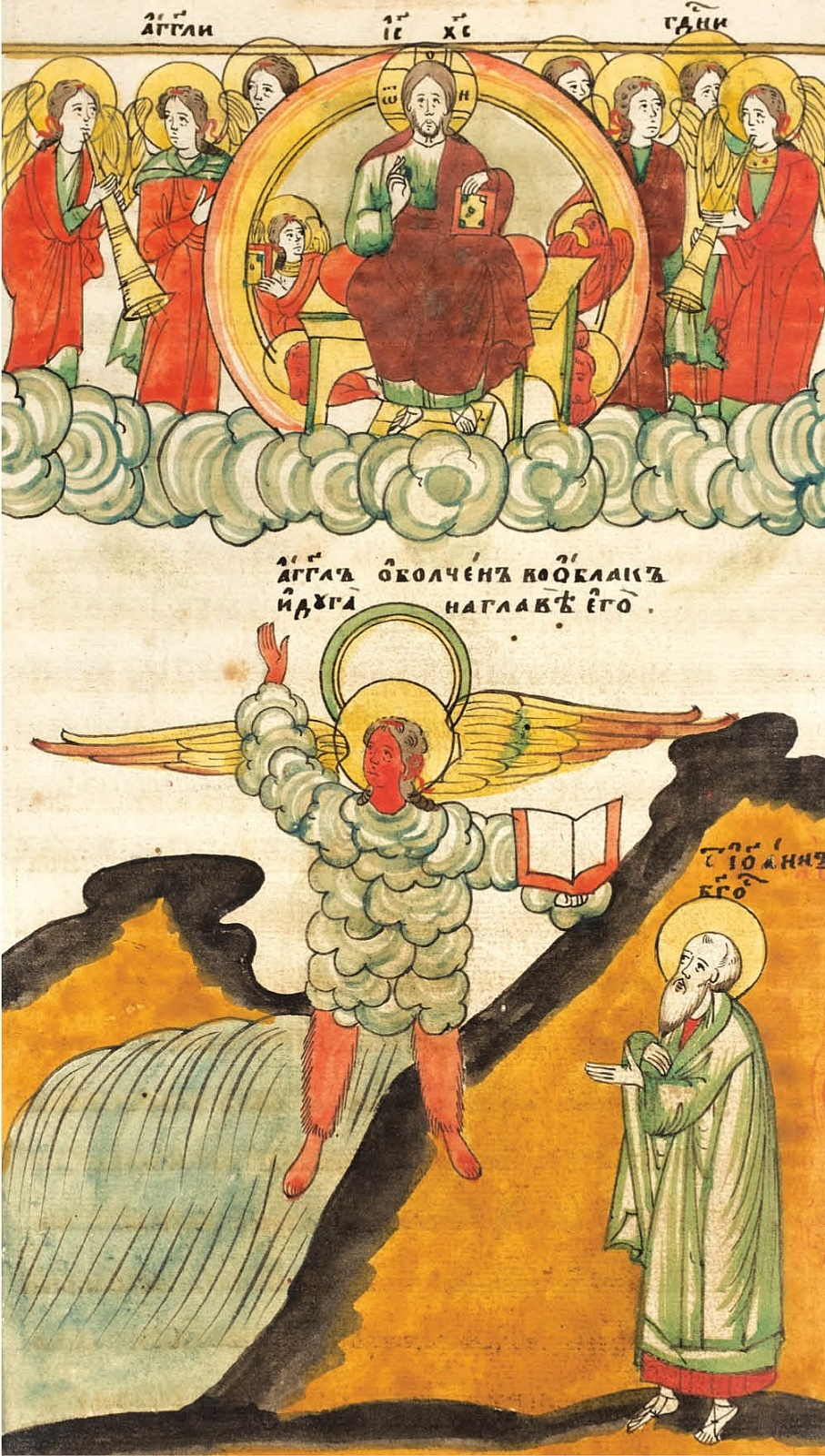
Angel with body made of clouds, from an Old Believer manuscript of c. 1700

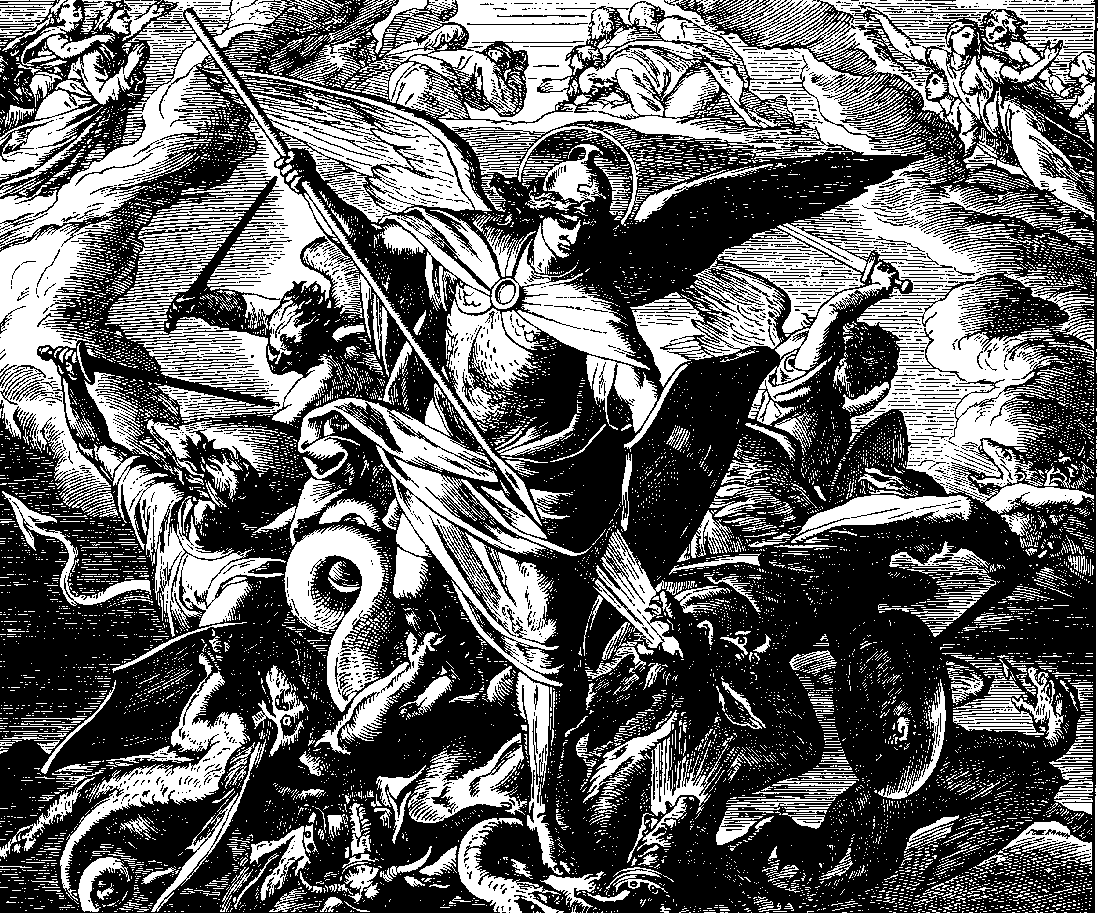
Michael and the Dragon. Die Bibel in Bildern by Julius Schnorr von Carolsfeld, 1860

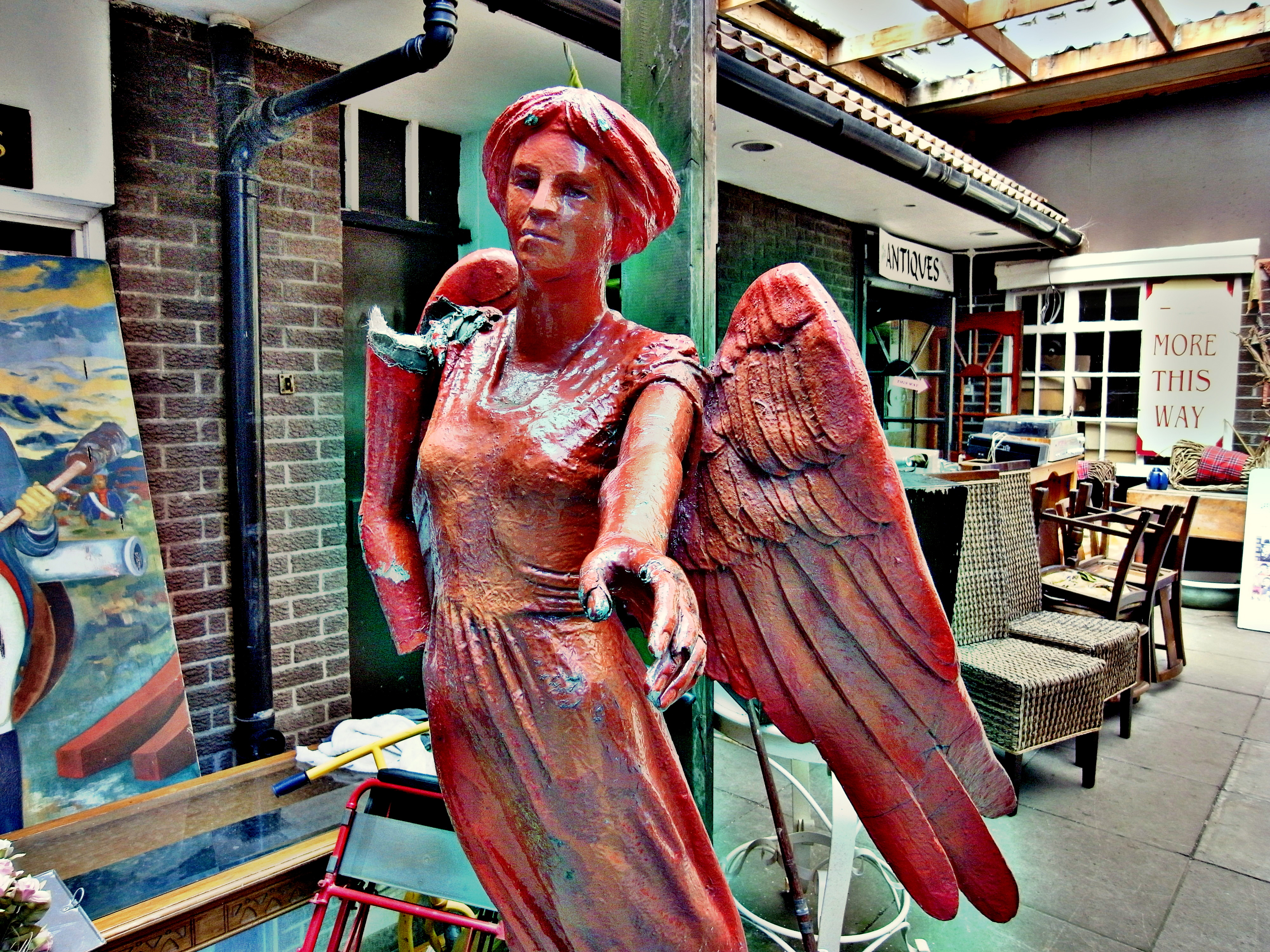
Glasgow. The Barras. Modern sculpture of angel.

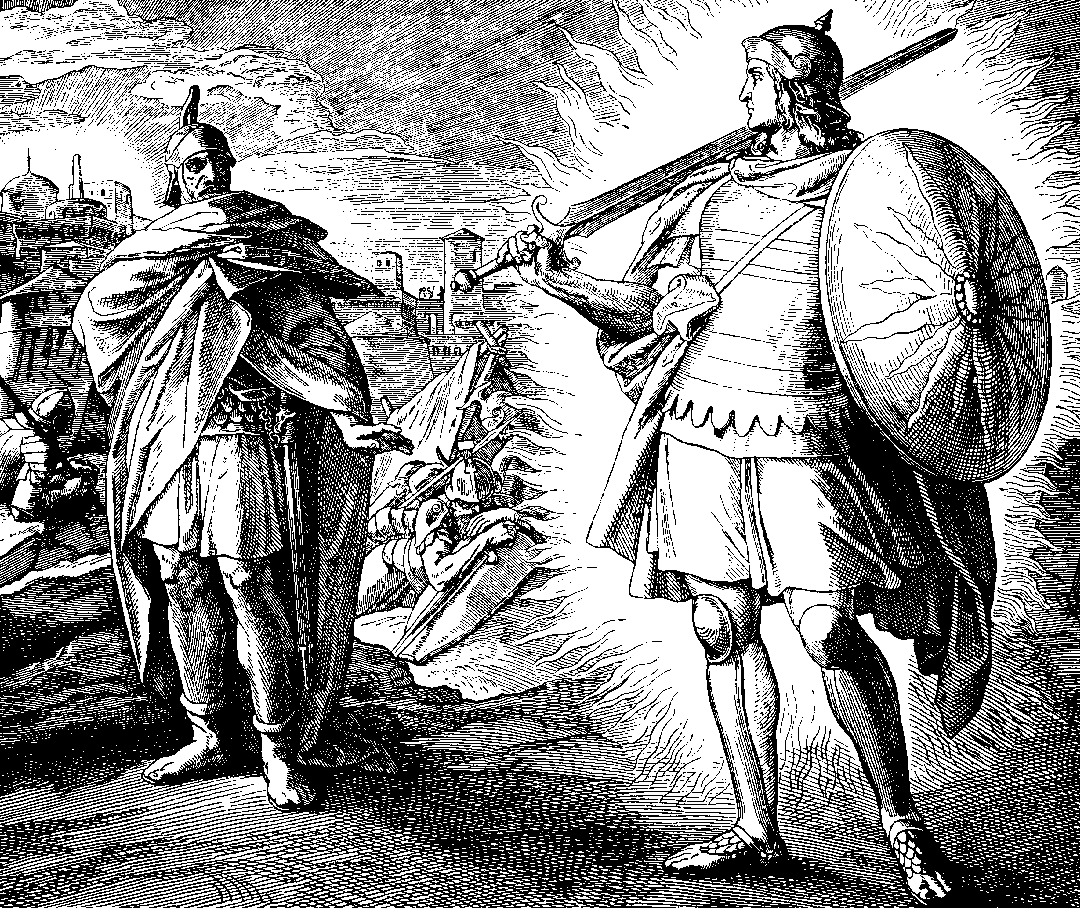
Joshua and the Angel (from Joshua 5:13–15), 1860 woodcut by von Karolsfeld

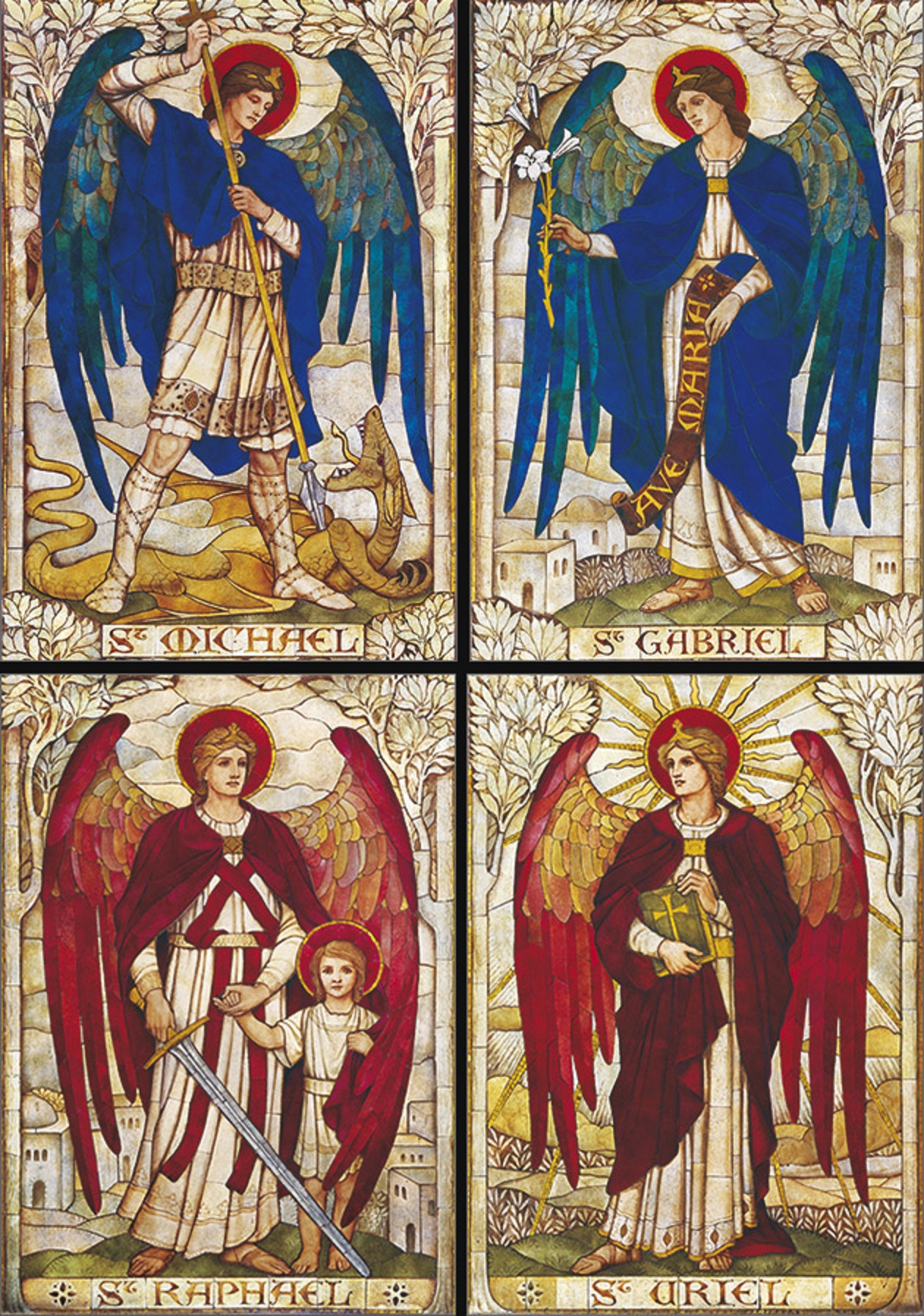
The four archangels in Anglican tradition, 1888 mosaics by James Powell and Sons, St John's Church, Warminster.

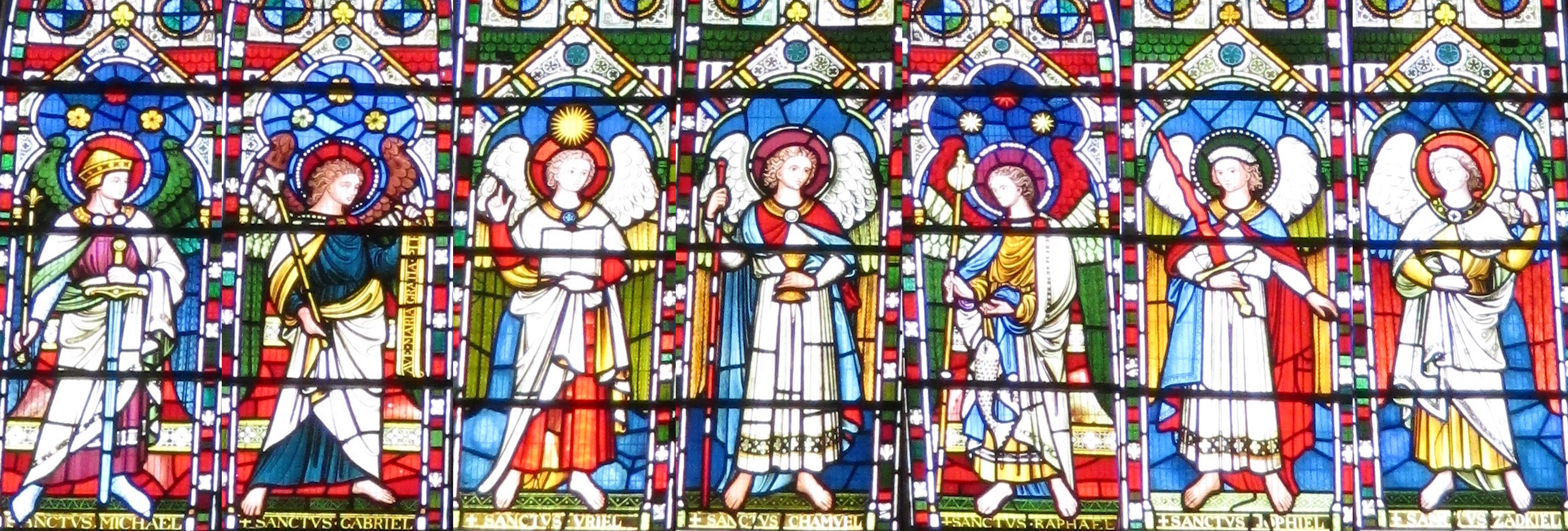
Seven Archangels as given by Pseudo-Dionysius depicted in the stained glass window at St Michael's Church, Brighton.

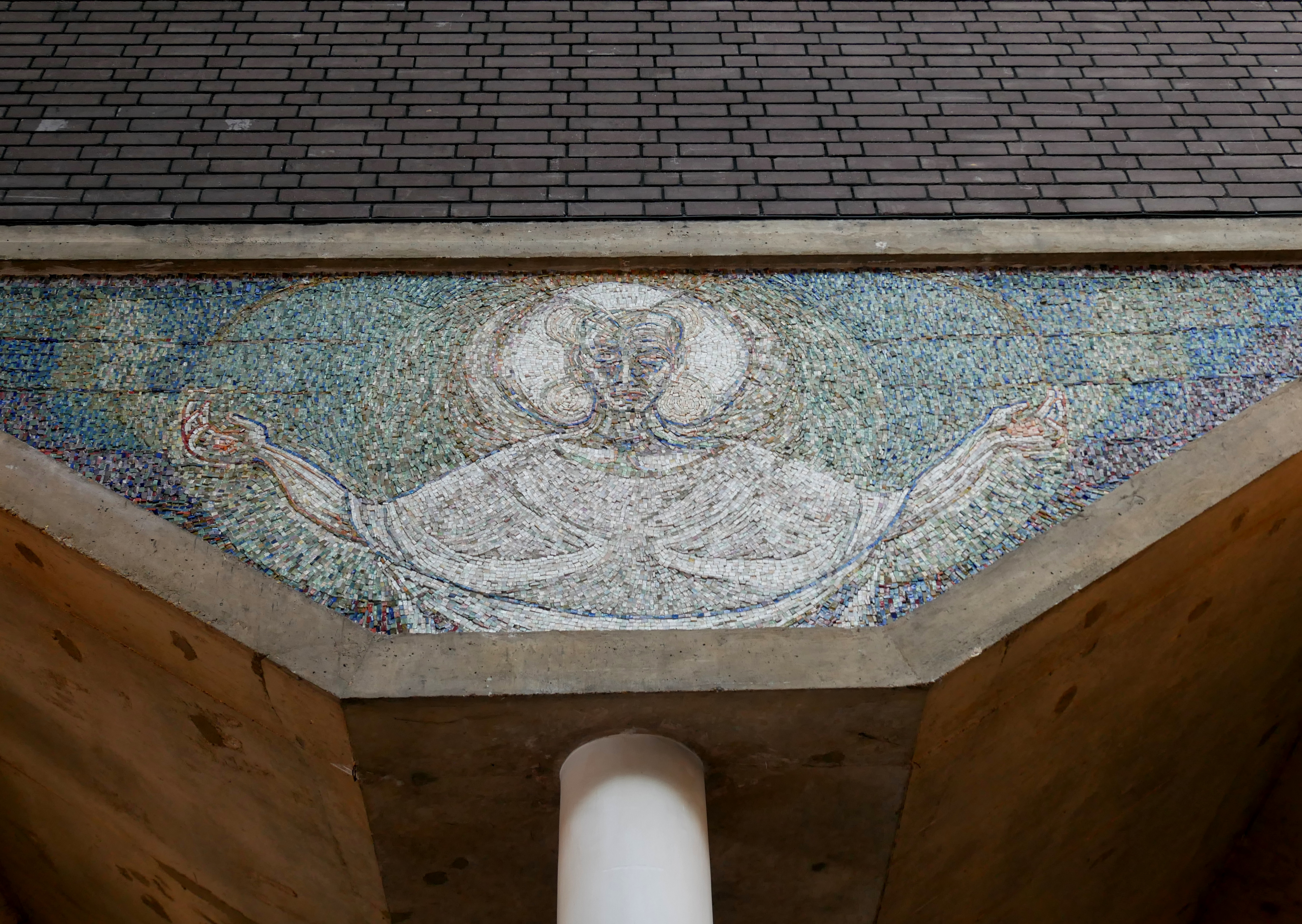
An angel in the large Angels of the Heavenly Host mosaic mural by Charles Lutyens (1963–68) in St Paul's, Bow Common.

== Gallery of angels in Islamic art ==
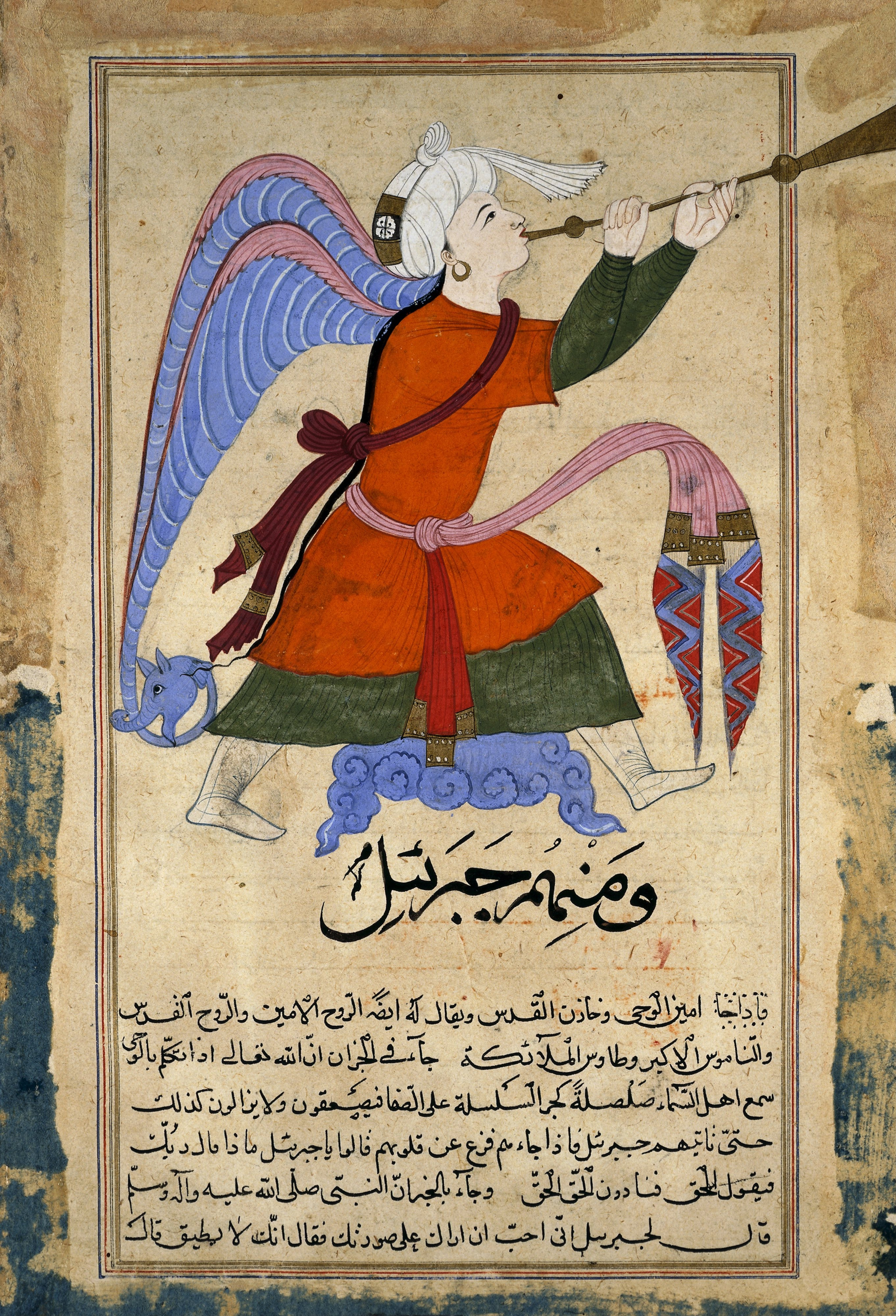
A page from 'The Wonders of Creation and the Oddities of Existence' – Egypt/Syria c.1375-1425 AD

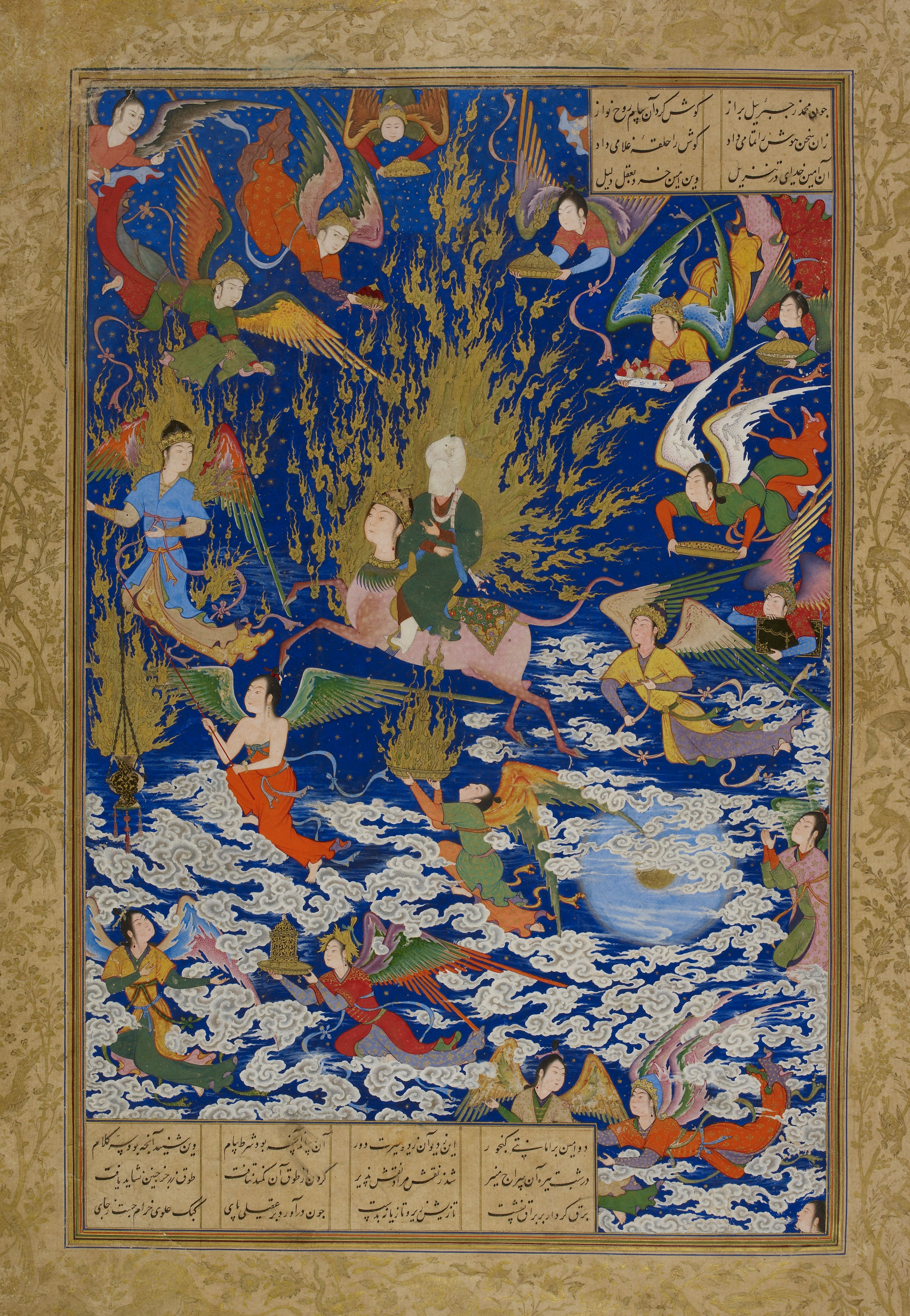
Persian Miraj image from 1539 to 1543, reflecting Muhammad surrounded by angels.

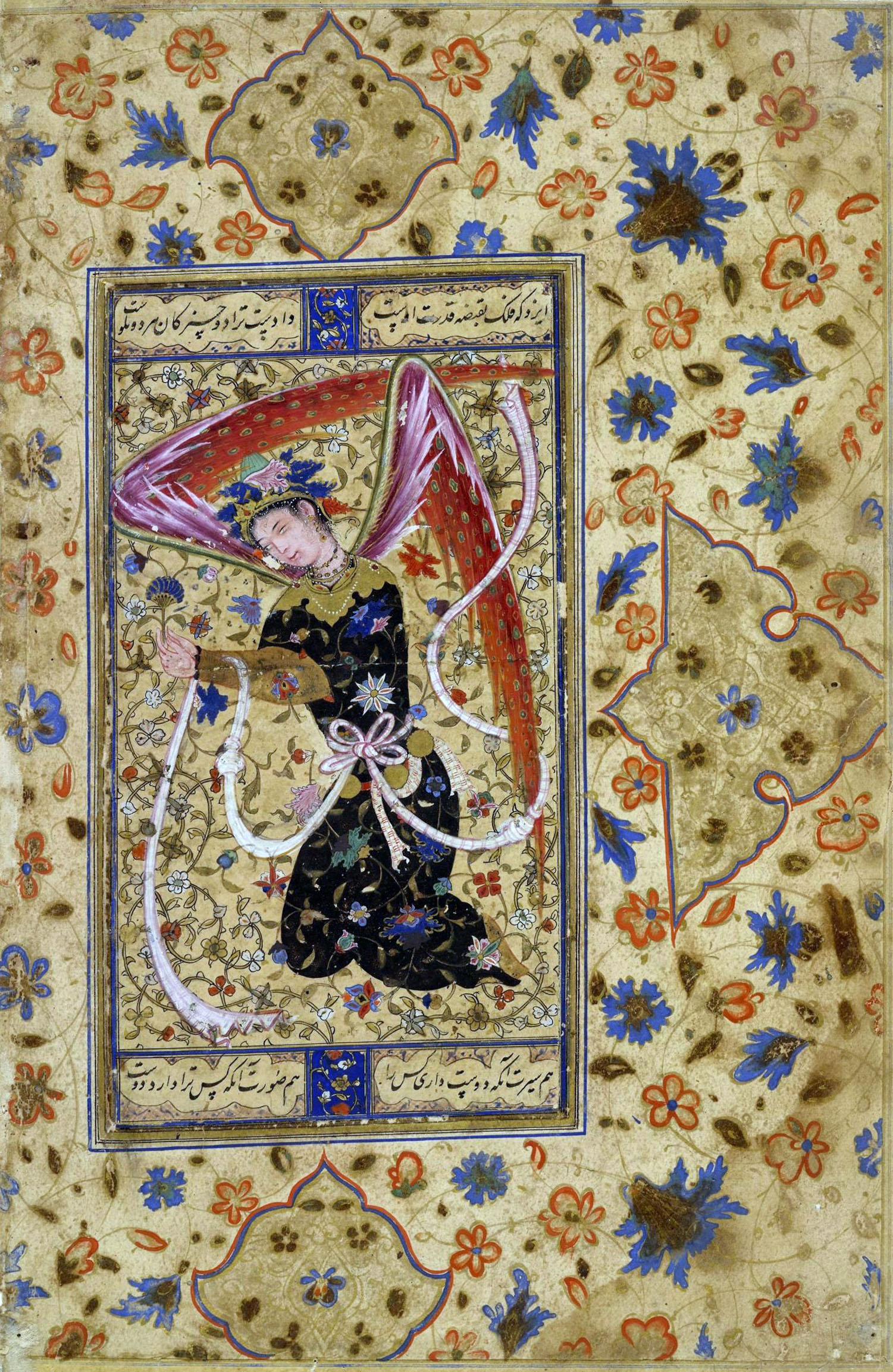
Kneeling angel, Bukhara School (circa 1555–1560)

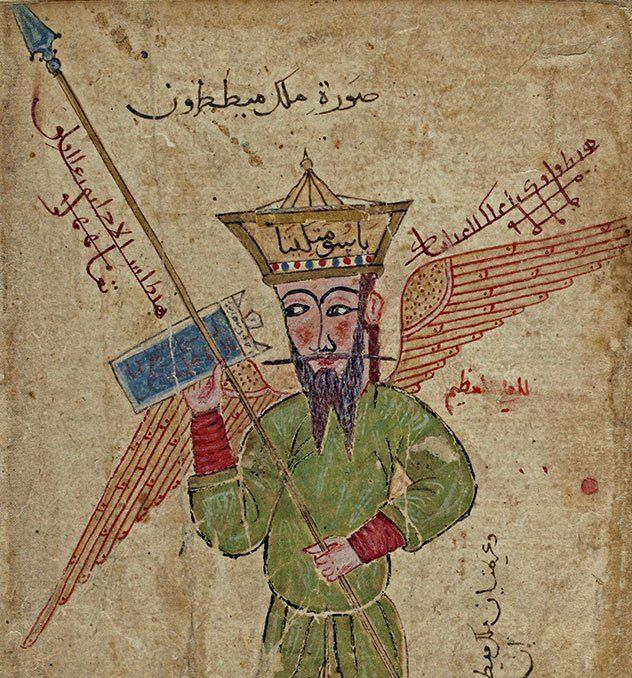
The high angel Metatron rendered by the 14th century artist Nasir al-Din Rammal.

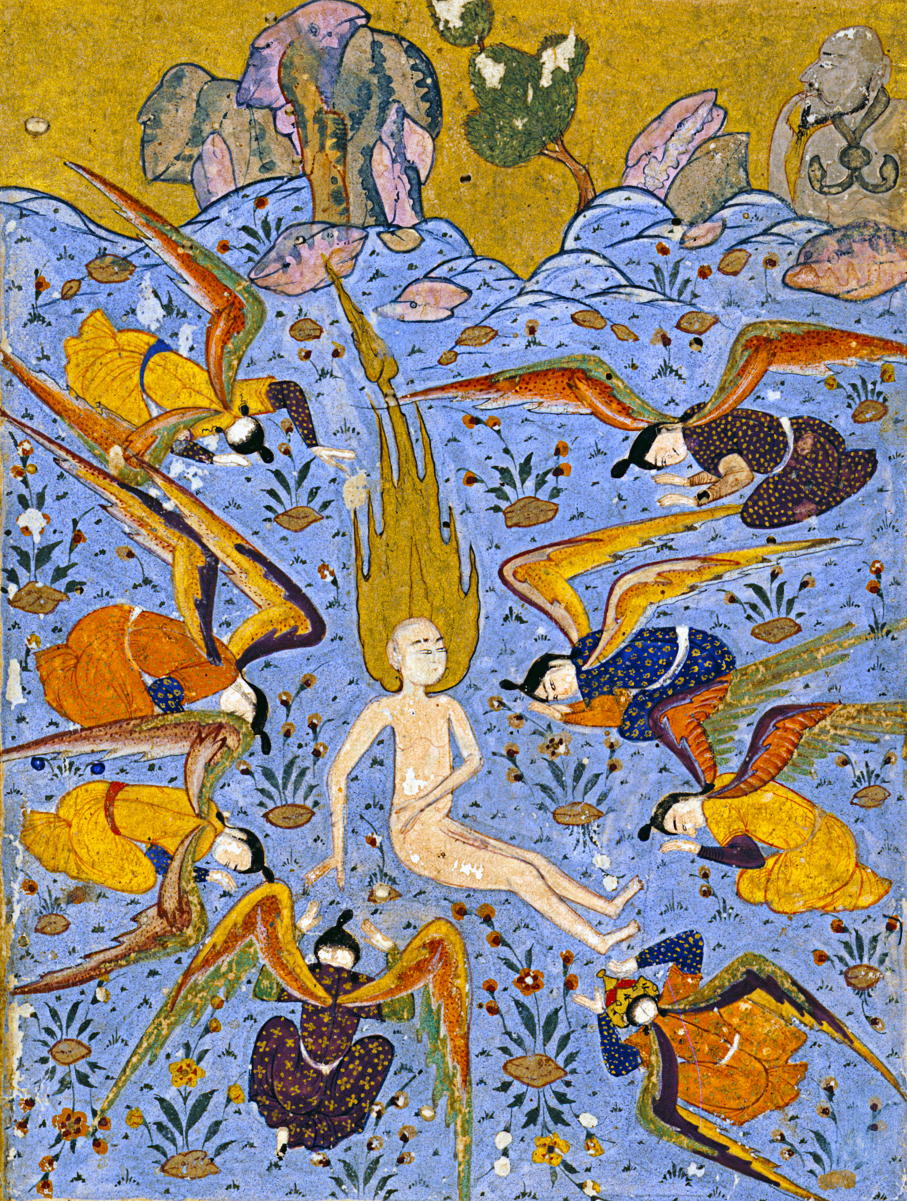
Angels witnessing the creation of Adam, Persian miniature (c. 1560).

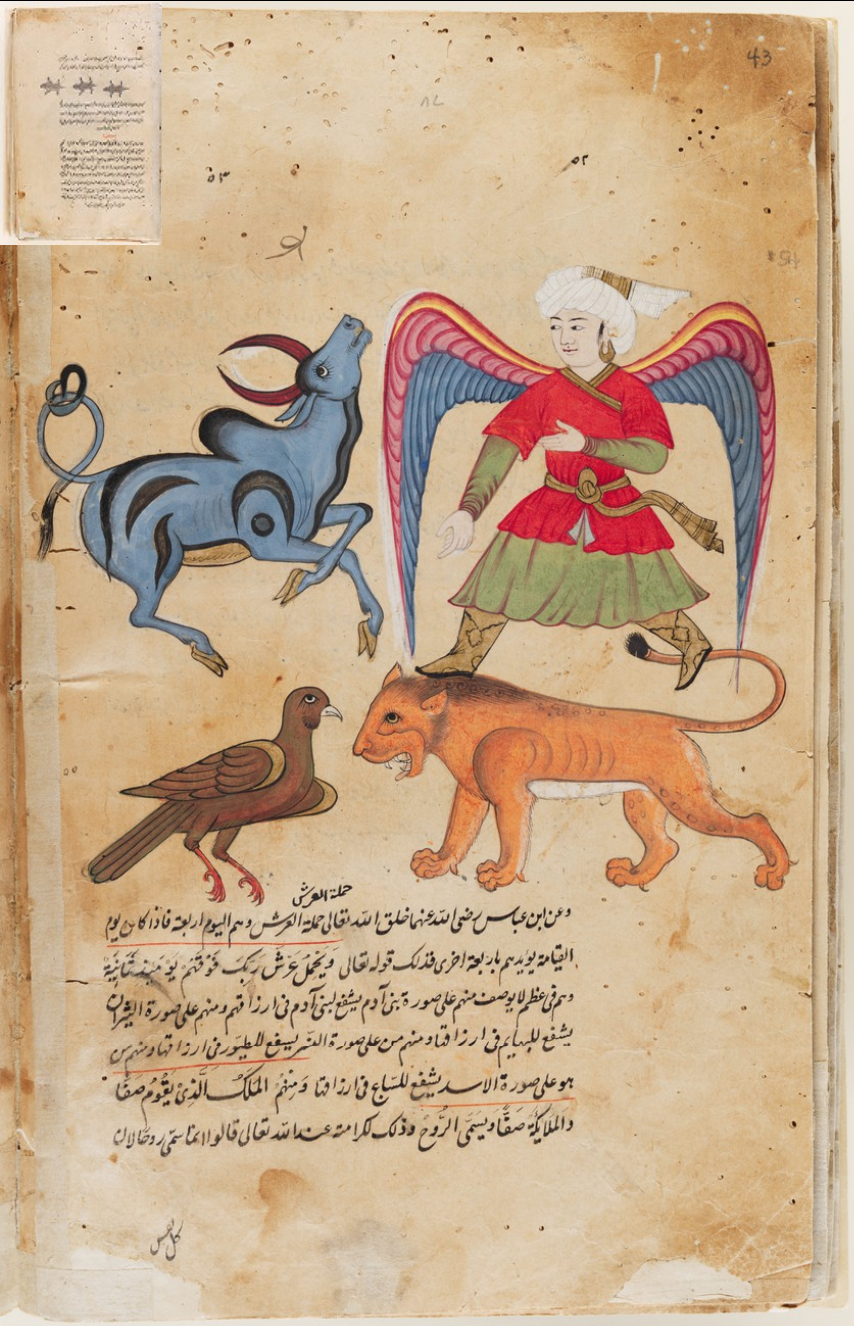
Image of an angel with animals from The Wonders of Creation, c. 1650–1700. (held in the Bavarian State Library)

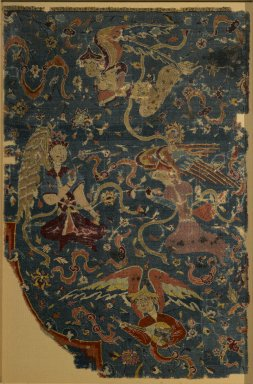
Carpet fragment depicting angels, Safavid dynasty, early 16th century.

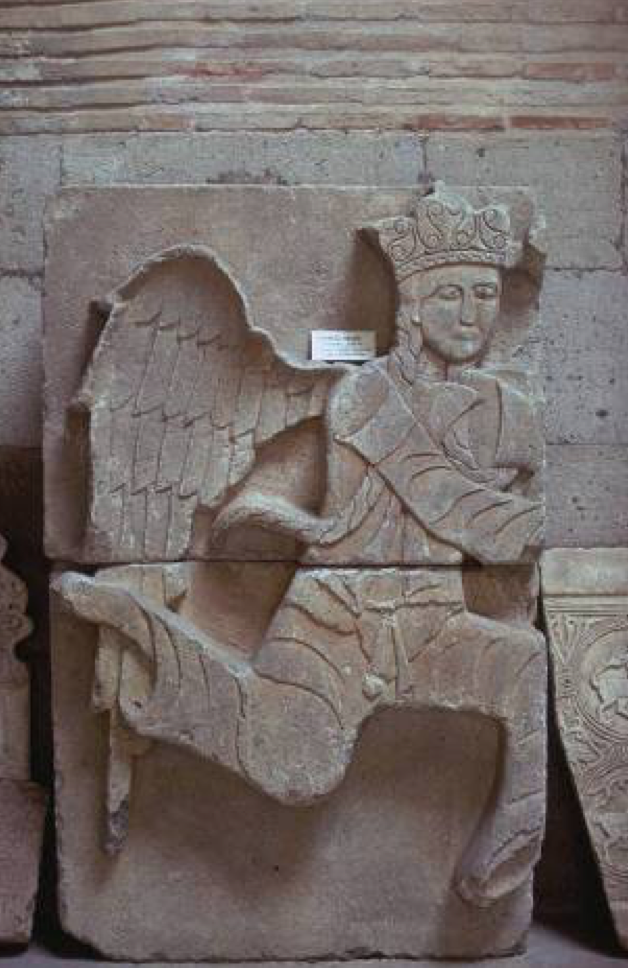
Fragment of sculpture from Konya city walls, c. 1220–1221.

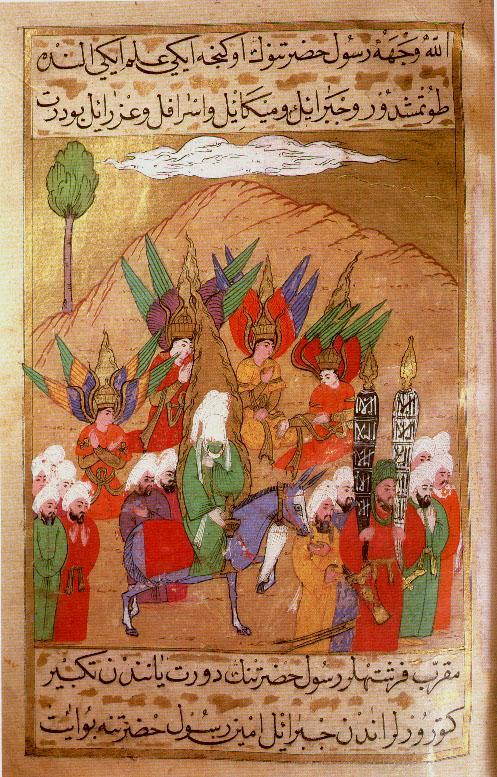
Muhammad advancing on Mecca, with the angels Gabriel, Michael, Israfil and Azrail. (Siyer-i Nebi, 16th century)

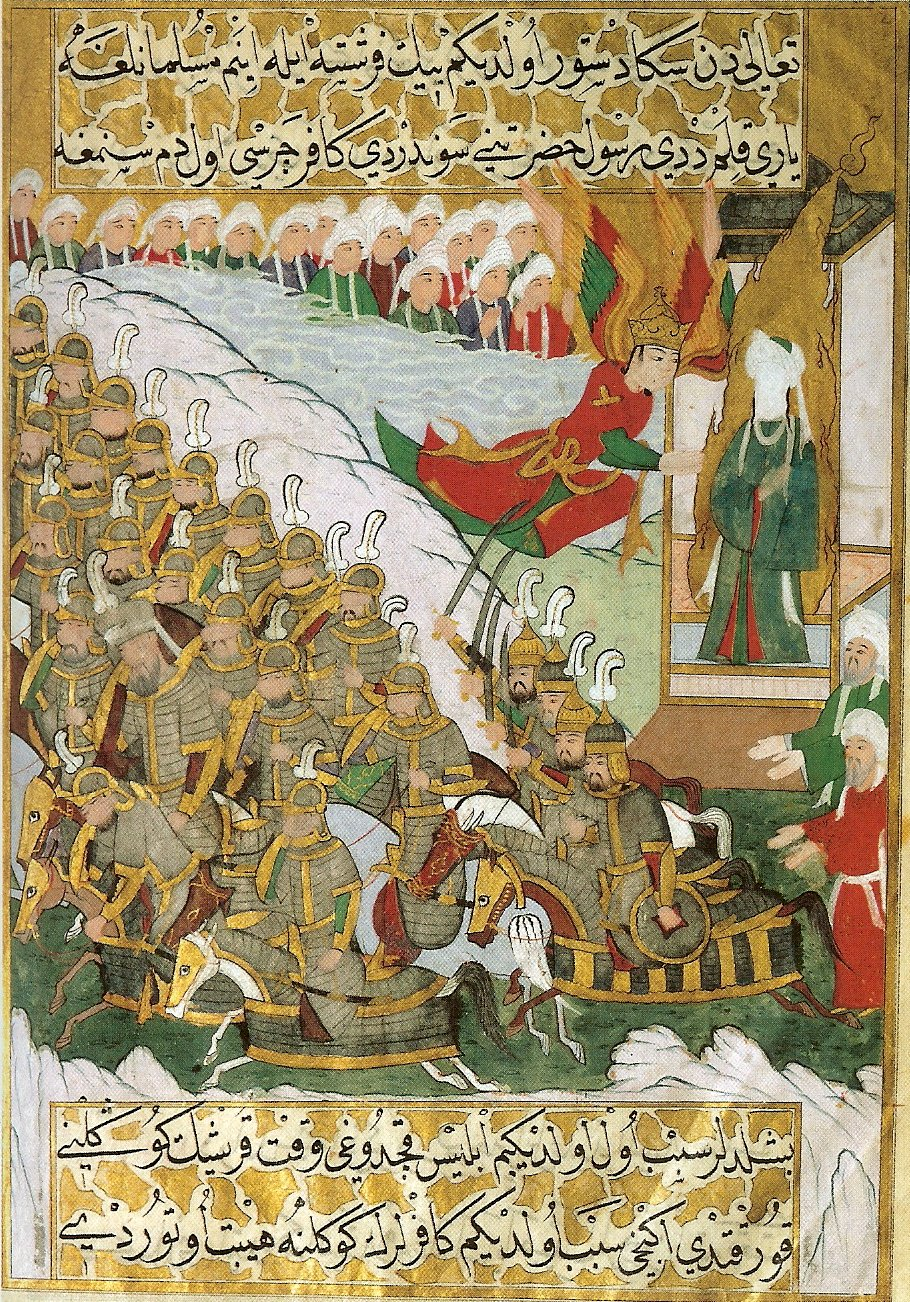
Muhammad at the Battle of Badr. (Siyer-i Nebi, 16th century)

== Gallery of angels in Jewish art ==
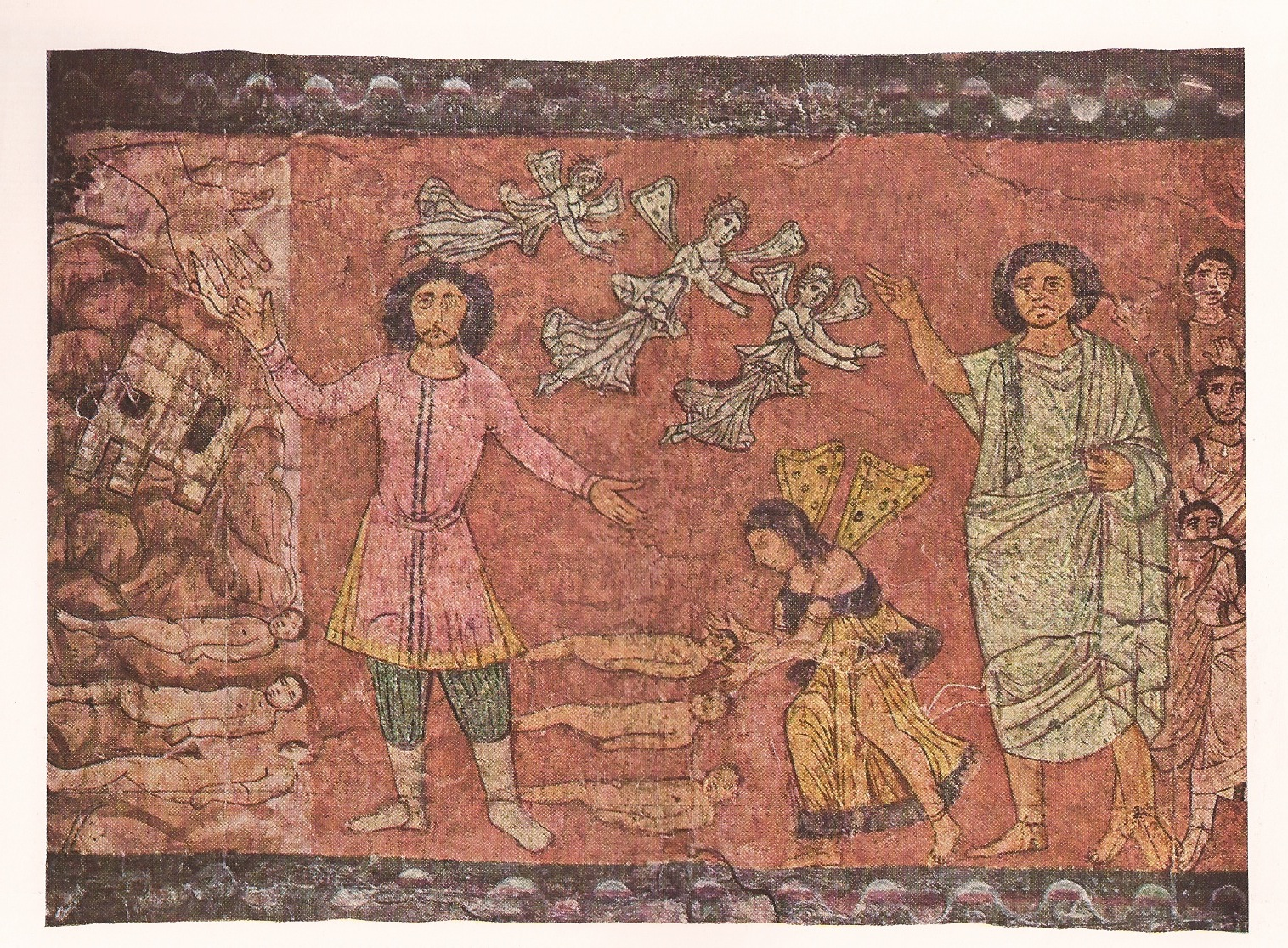
Angels with butterfly wings restoring life in a mural from the Dura Europos synagogue.

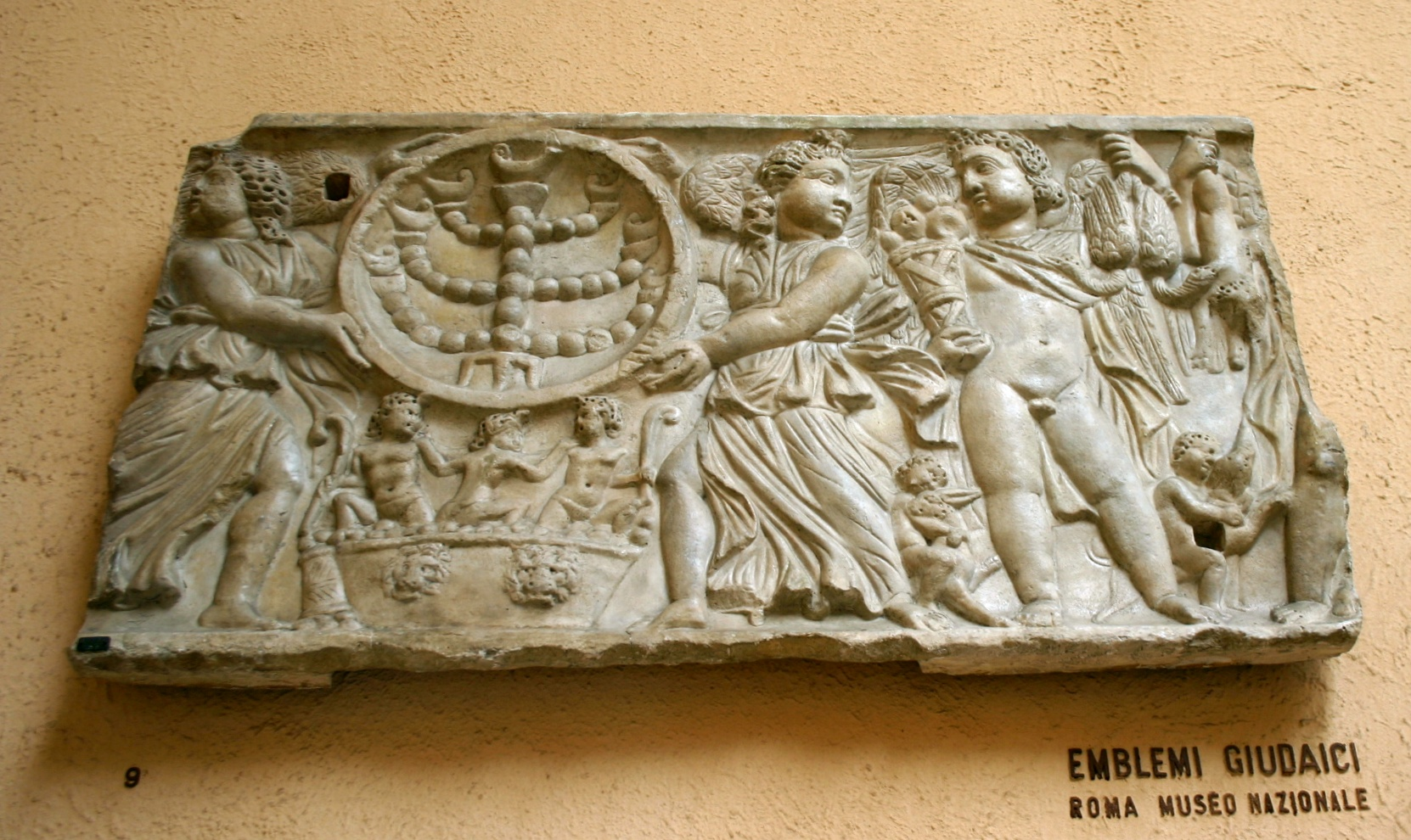
2nd or 3rd-century carving of the Menorah being attended by angels, including angels who may represent the seasons of the year.

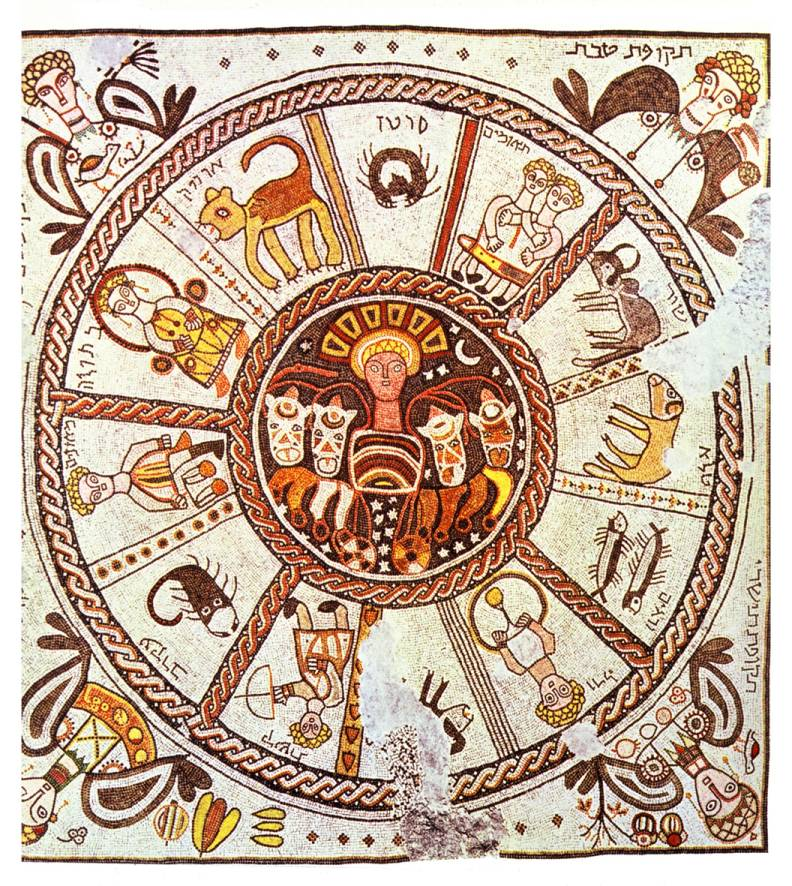
6th century zodiac mosaic from the Beth Alpha Synagogue. At the corners are winged female angels, perhaps representing the seasons.

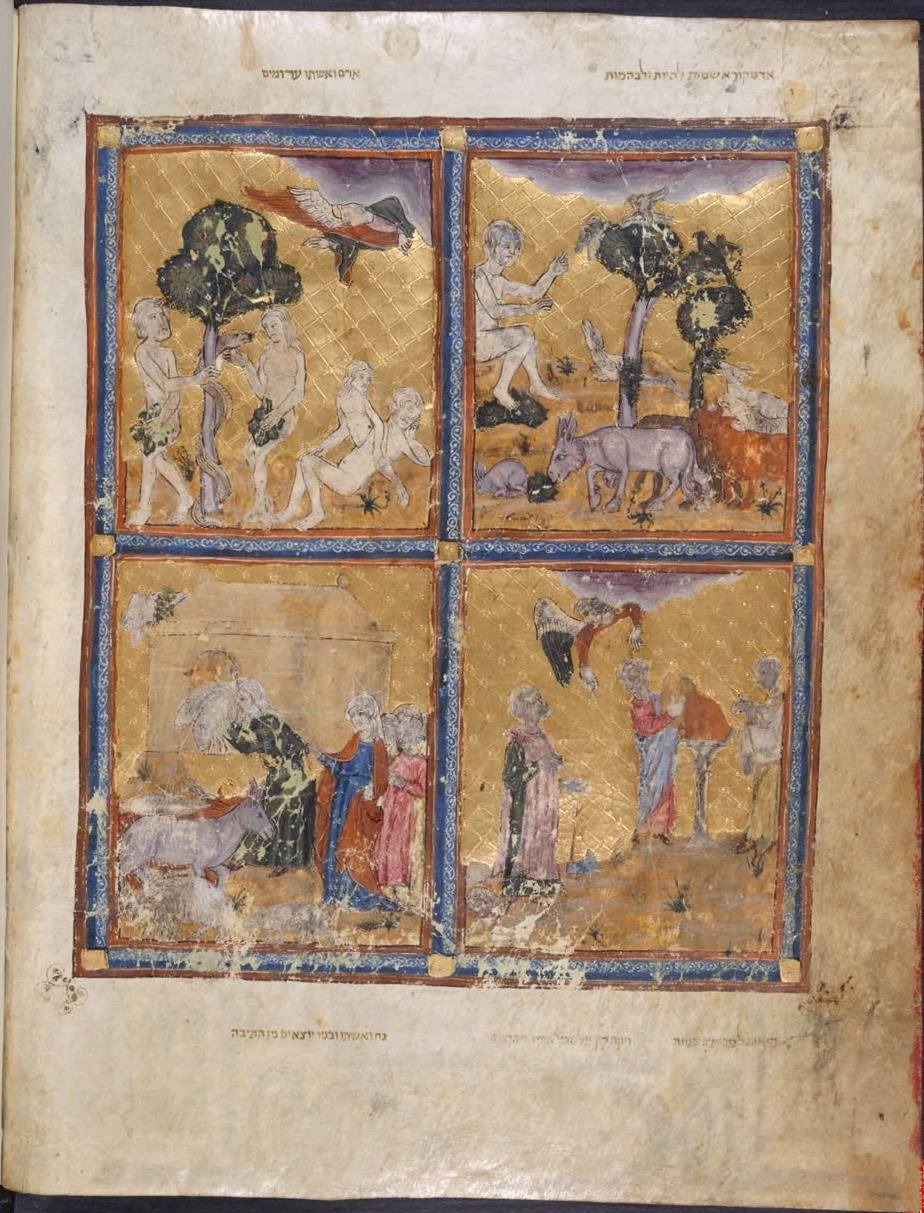
Angels in the Golden Haggadah, a 14th-century manuscript.

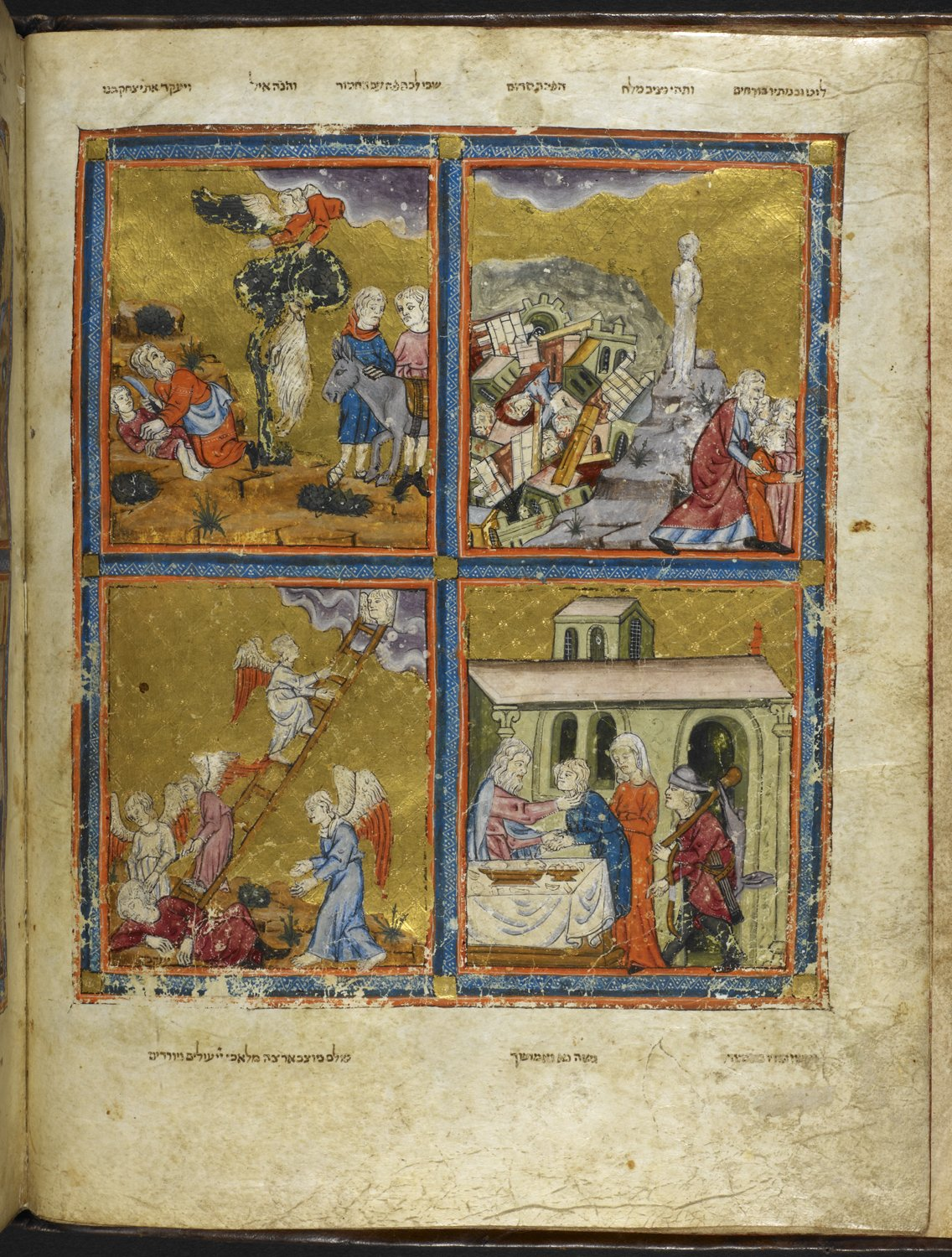
Angels in the Golden Haggadah.

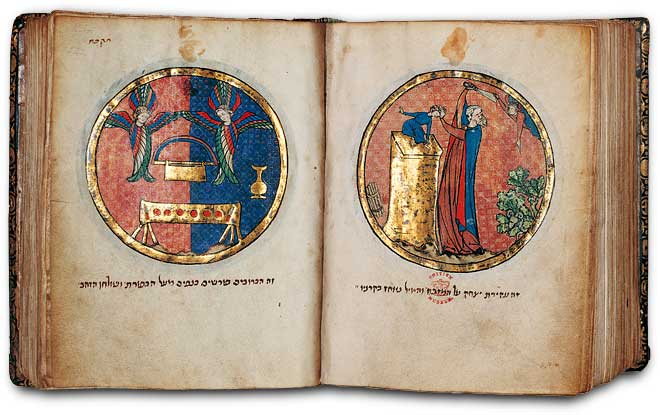
Cherubim (left) in a 13th-century French Hebrew manuscript.

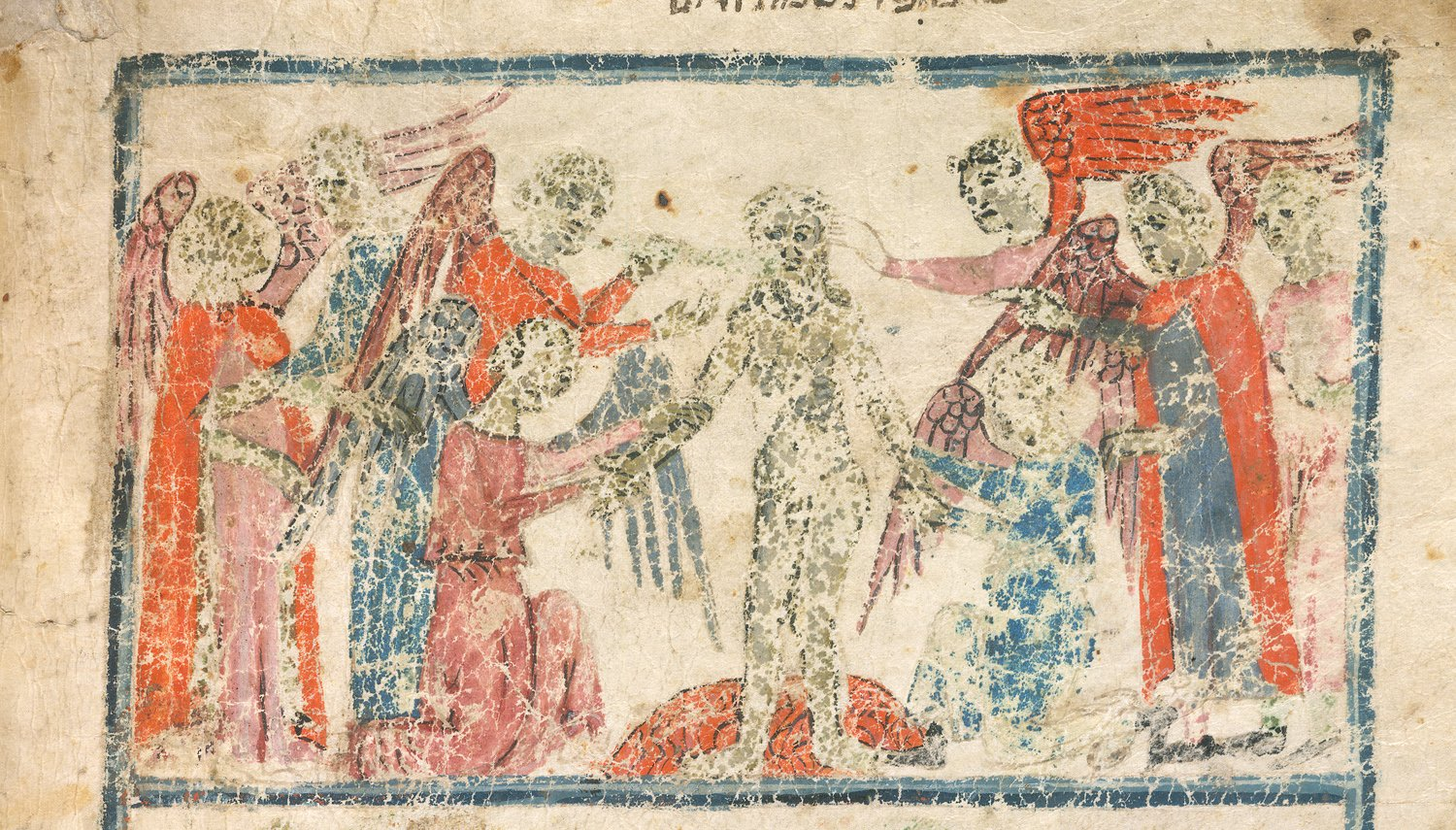
Adam and the angels in the Sister Haggadah, from 1325 to 1374

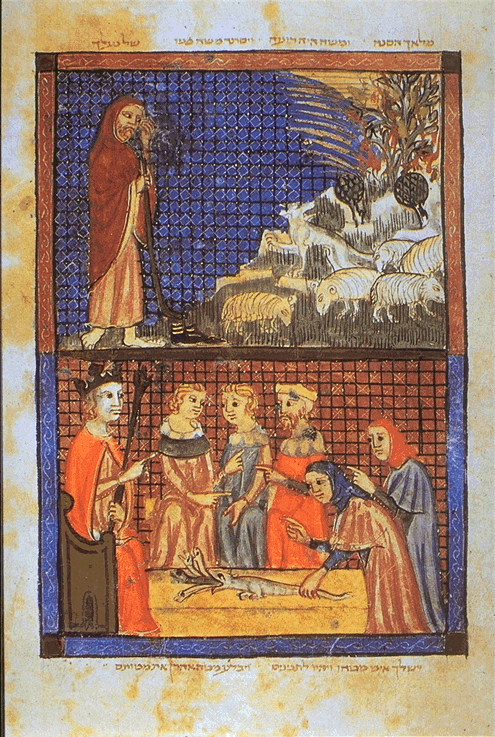
Abstract depiction of an angel (top right) in the Sarajevo Haggadah, 15th century.

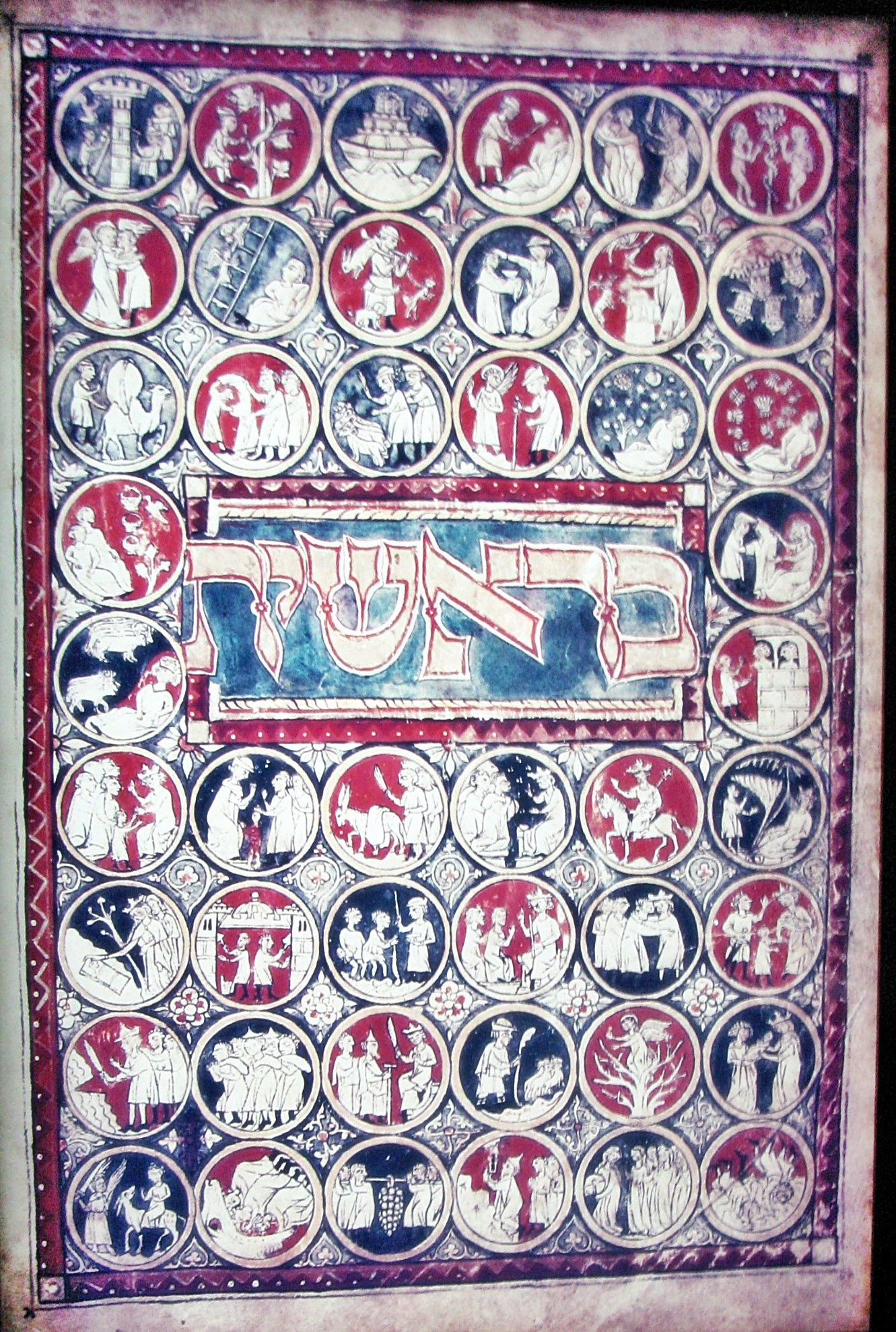
Torah frontispiece made of miniatures, some of which include angels.

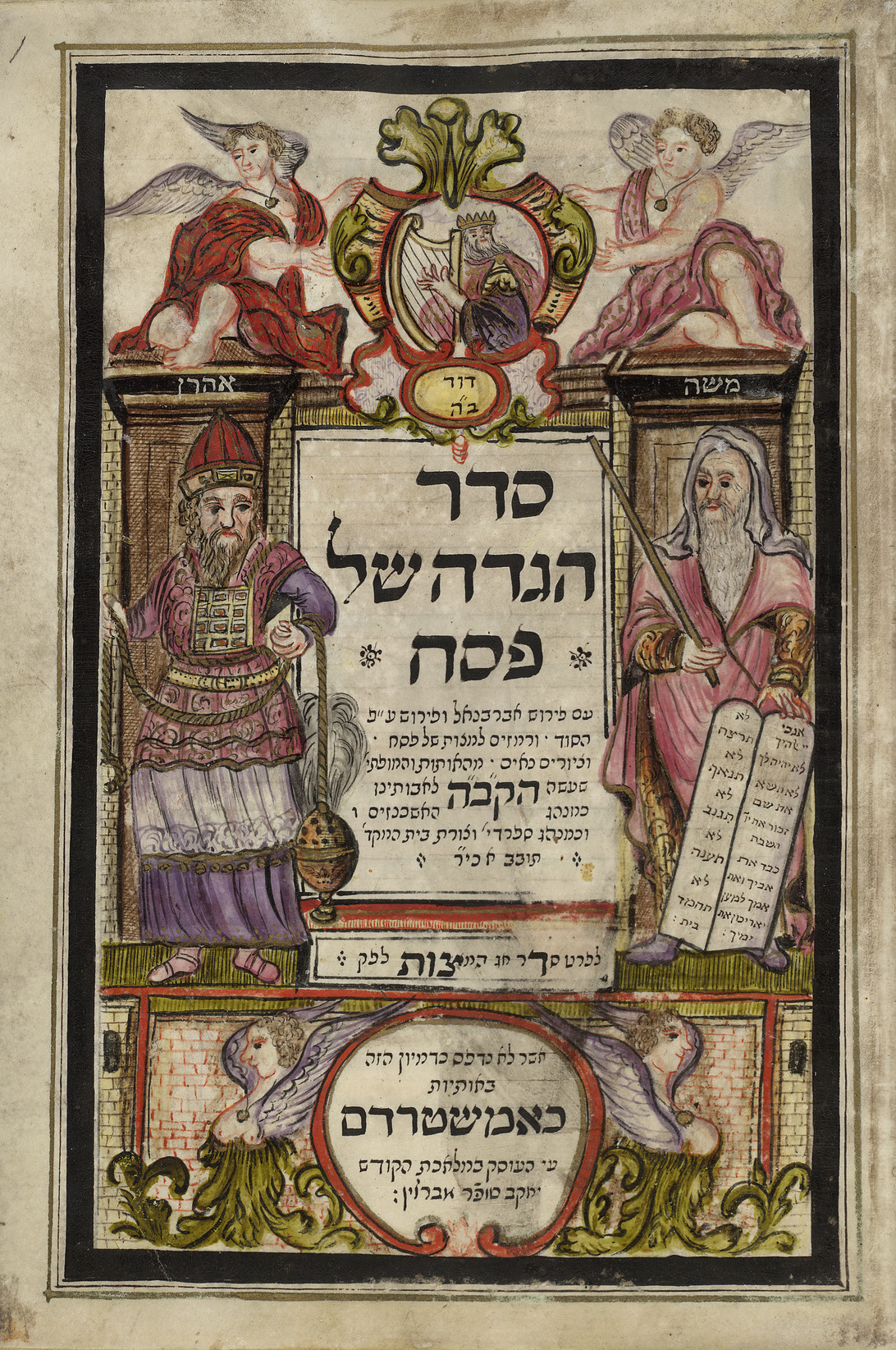
Angels in a Haggadah from 1740.

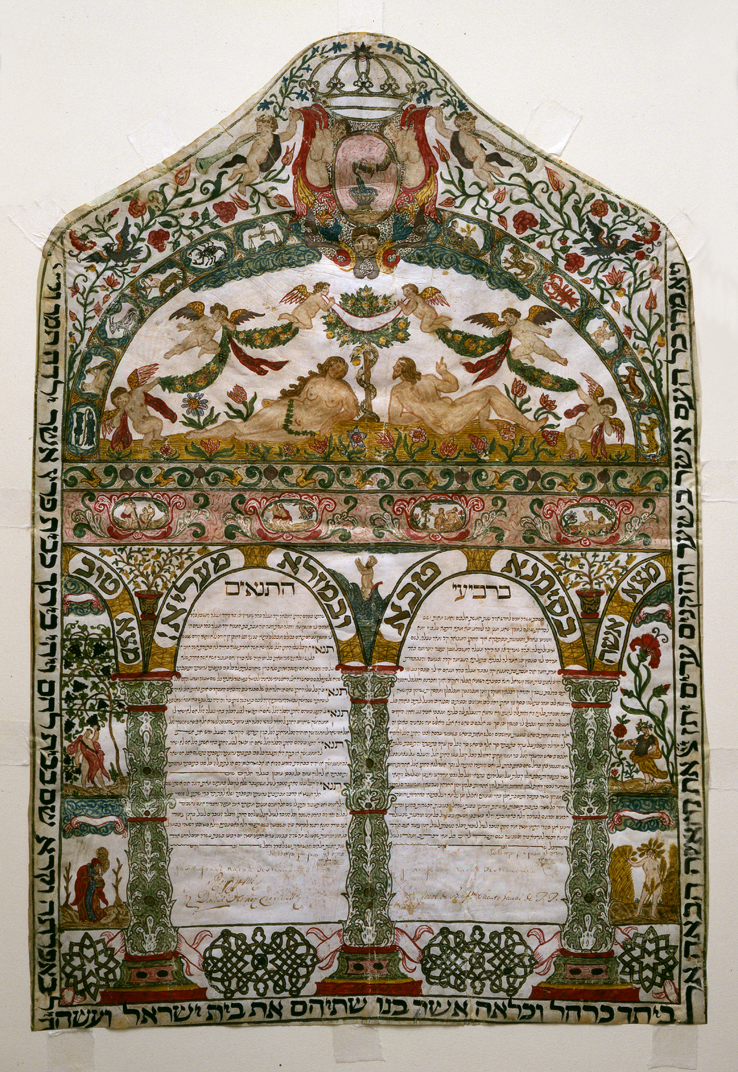
Angels on a Ketubah from 1746.

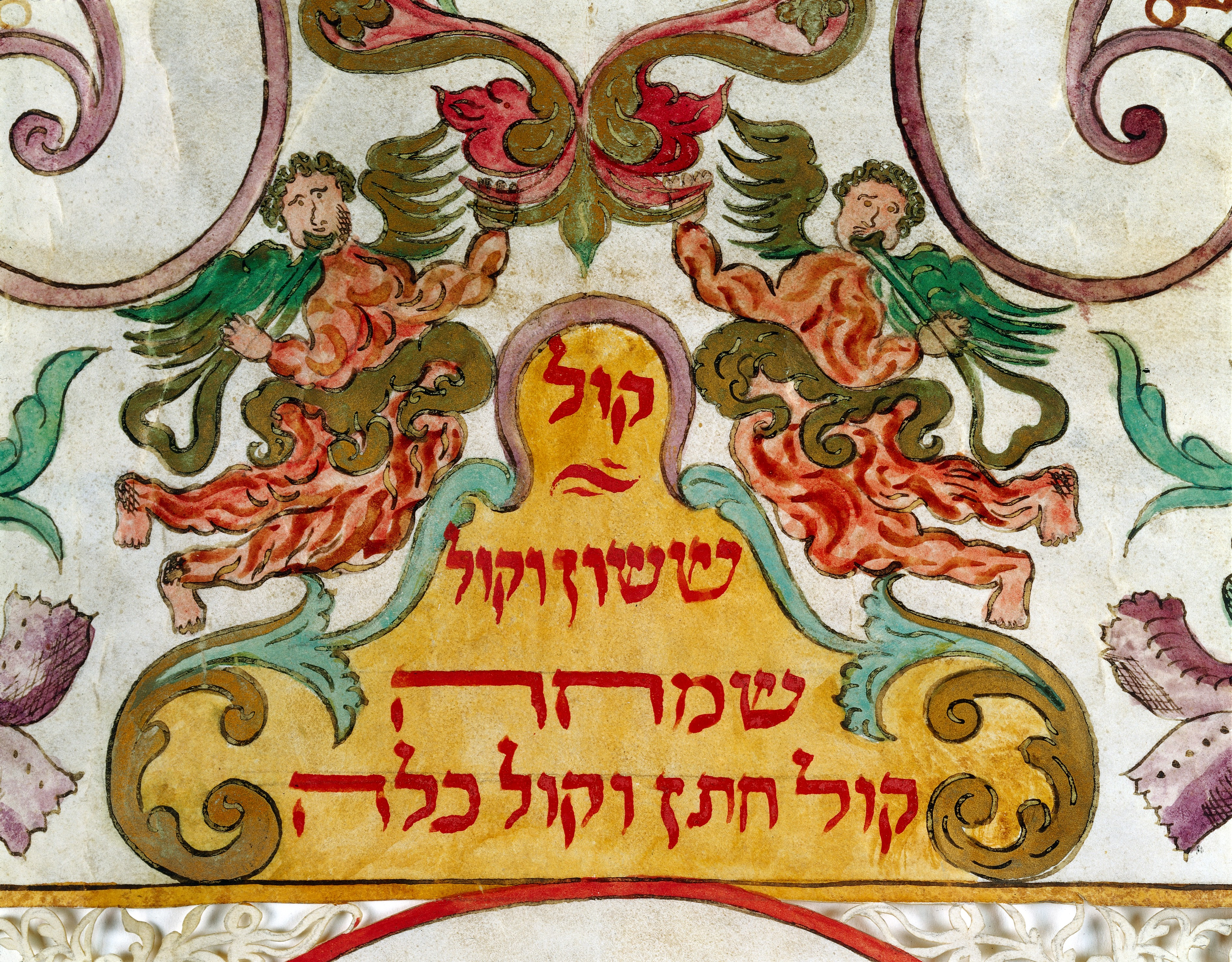
Angels on a Ketubah from 1754.

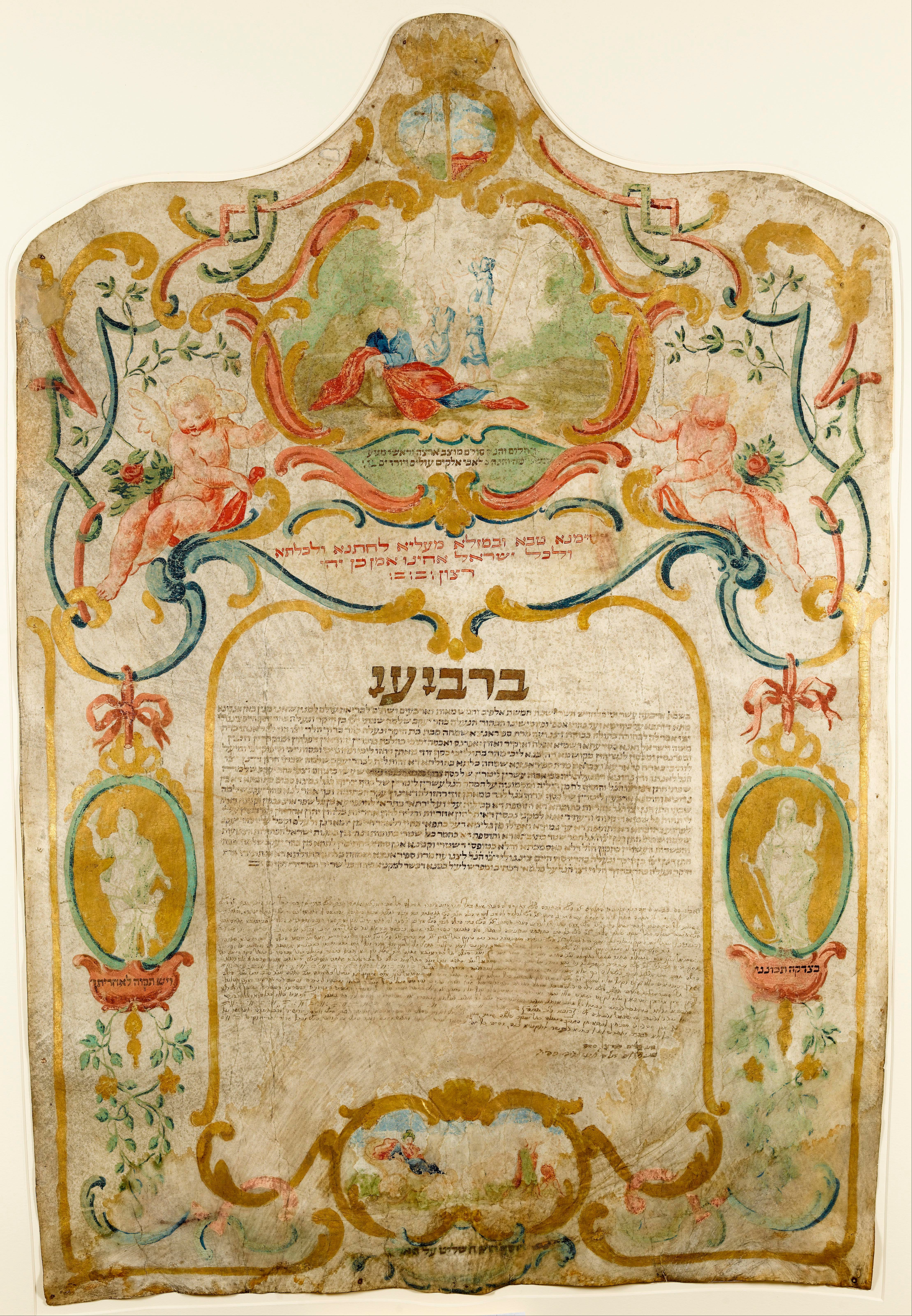
Angels on a Ketubah from 1781.

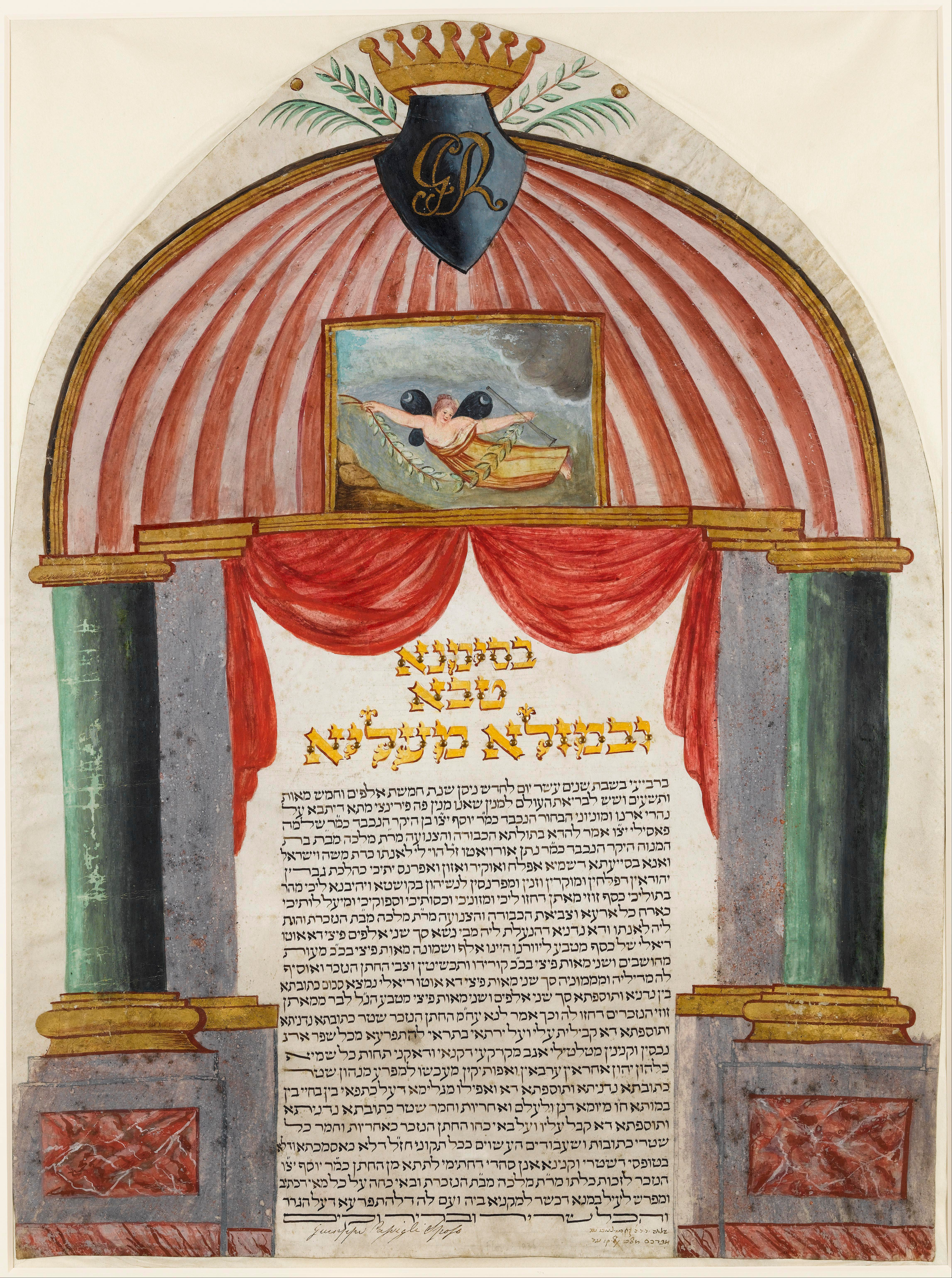
Possible angel with butterfly wings on a Ketubah from 1836.

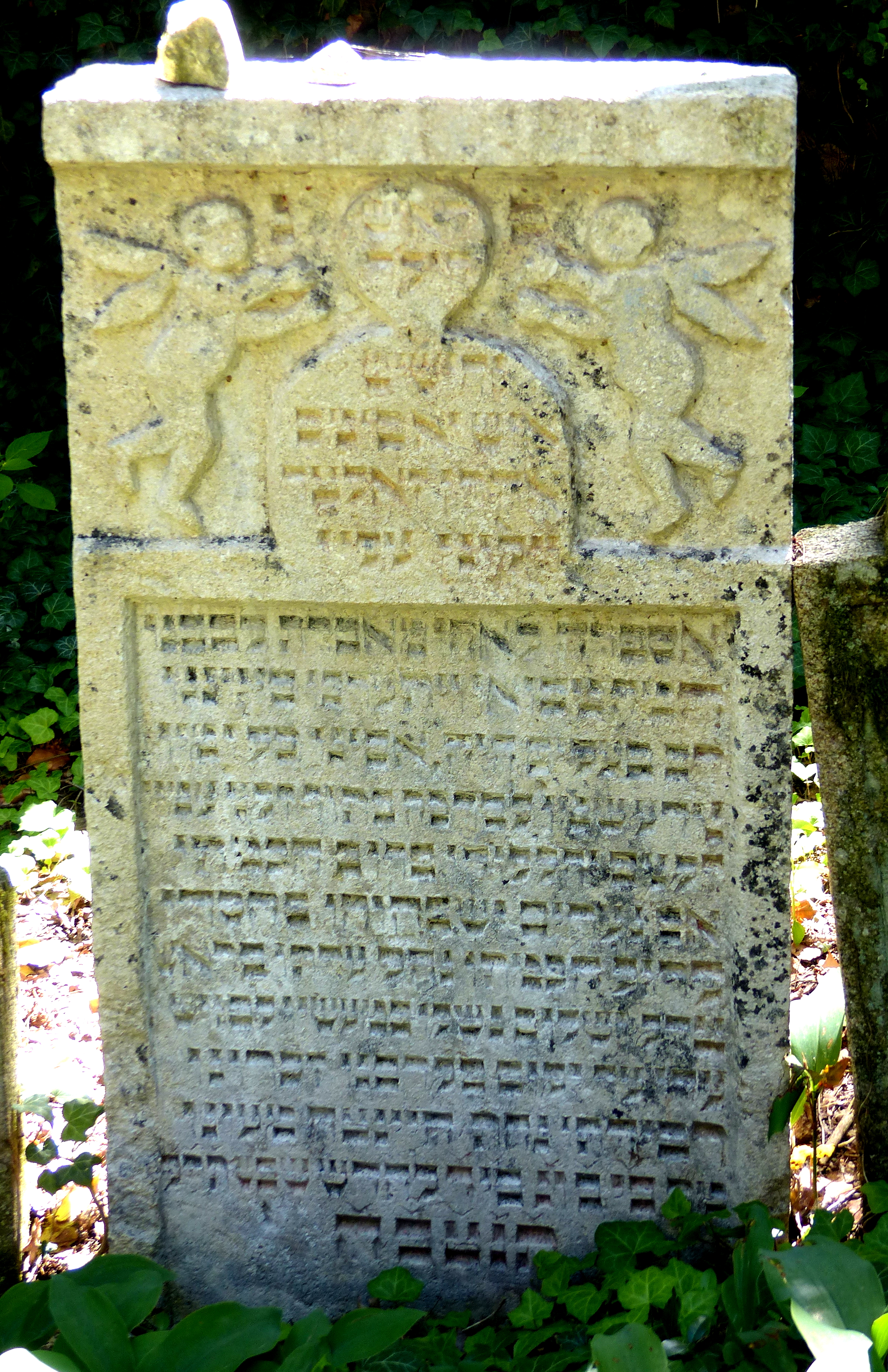
Angels on a Jewish tombstone.

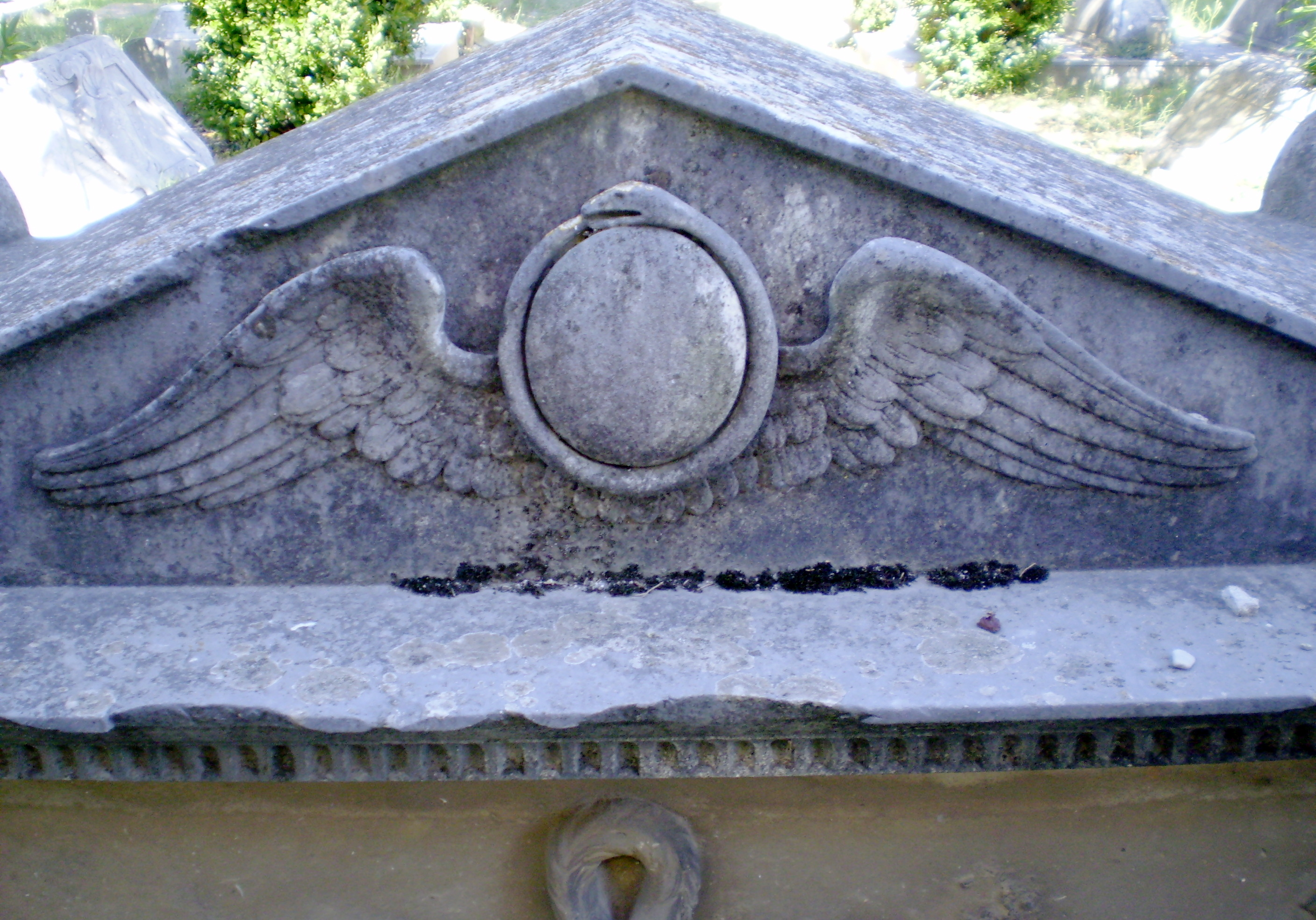
Italian Jewish tombstone possibly depicting a seraph.

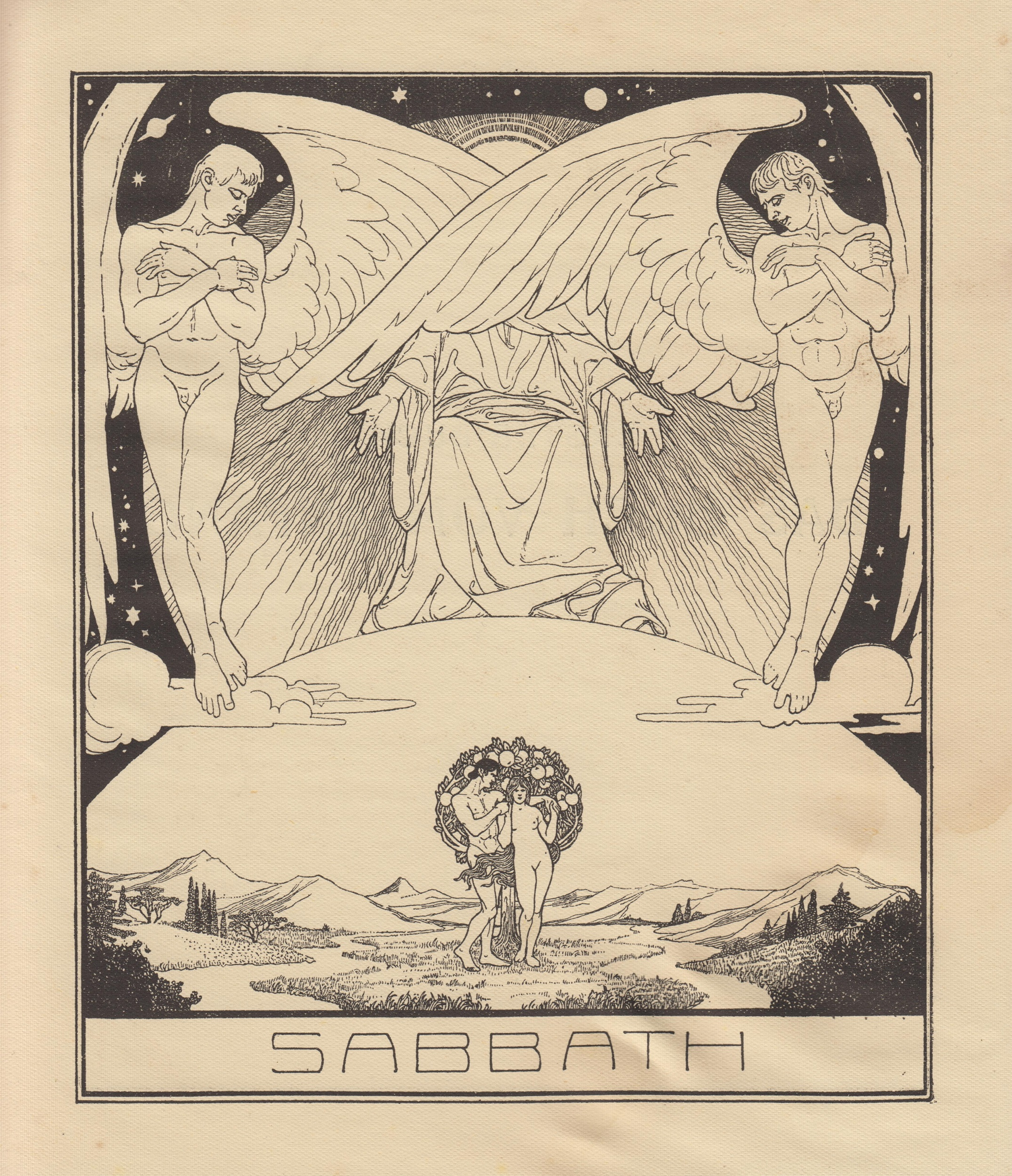
Early 20th century art from Ephraim Moses Lilien of God being attended by angels.

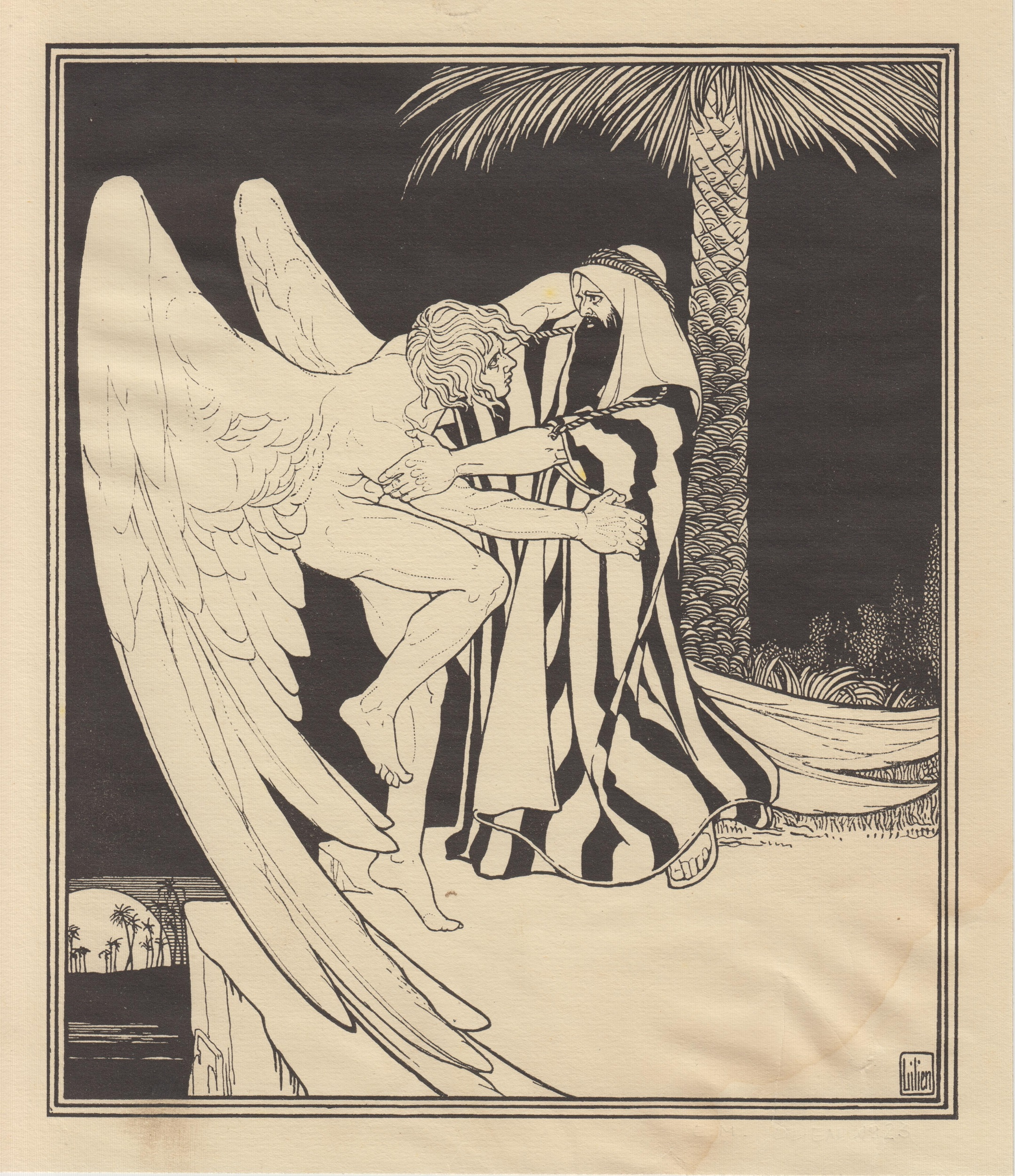
Jacob wrestling the angel.

== See also ==
- Archangel Michael in Christian art
- Michael (archangel)
- Gabriel
- Angels in Islam
- Angelus
- Fleur de lys
- List of films about angels
- List of names referring to El
- Seraph
