= Hierarchy of angels =

Belief that angels are ordered according to rank

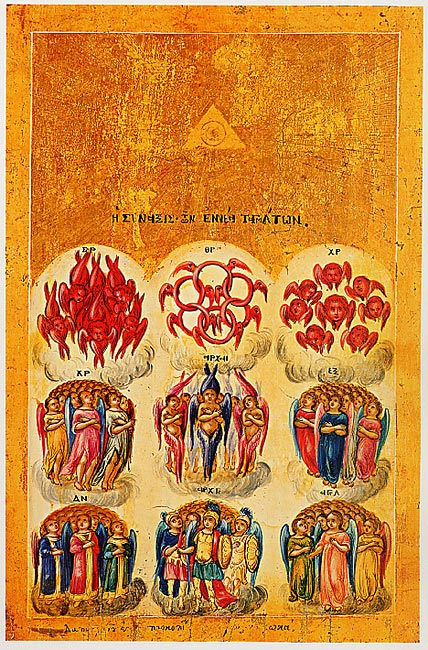
Orthodox icon of nine orders of angels

In the angelology of different religions, a hierarchy of angels is a ranking system of angels. The higher ranking angels have greater power and authority than lower ones, and different ranks have differences in appearance, such as varying numbers of wings or faces.

== Abrahamic religions ==
=== Judaism ===
The Jewish angelic hierarchy is established in the Hebrew Bible, Talmud, Rabbinic literature, and traditional Jewish liturgy. They are categorized in different hierarchies proposed by various theologians. For example, Maimonides, in his Mishneh Torah or Yad ha-Chazakah: Yesodei ha-Torah, counts ten ranks of angels. The Zohar, in Exodus 43a, also lists ten ranks of angels. Jacob Nazir, in his Maseket Atzilut, also listed ten ranks of angels. Abraham ben Isaac of Granada, in his Berit Menuchah, also listed ten ranks of angels.

All of them are ranked with 1 being the highest, and all subsequent numbers being lower ranks.

Rank					Angelic Class	Notes	Refs
Mishneh Torah	Zohar	Maseket Atzilut	Berit Menuchah	Reshit Chochmah	Angelic Class	Notes	Refs
1	4	N/A	N/A	1	Chayot Ha Kodesh/Chayot		See Ezekiel 1 and Ezekiel 10
2	5	2	9	2	Ophan		See Ezekiel 1 and Ezekiel 10
3	2	10	1	5	Erel		See Isaiah 33:7
4	6	7	5	7	Hashmal		See Ezekiel 1:4
5	3	1	10	3	Seraph		See Isaiah 6
6	1	8	4	9	Malakh/Malak	Messengers, angels	
7	8	N/A	N/A	N/A	Elohim	"Godly beings", Divine beings who were not the Supreme God	
8	9	9	3	N/A	Bene Elohim	"Sons of God"	
9	N/A	3	8	4	Cherub		See Hagigah 13b
10	10	6	2	10	Ish	"manlike beings"	see Genesis 18:2 Daniel 10:5
N/A	7	N/A	N/A	8	El		2 Corinthians 13:3
N/A	N/A	4	7	N/A	Shinan		3 Enoch
N/A	N/A	5	6	6	Tarshish		3 Enoch

=== Christianity ===
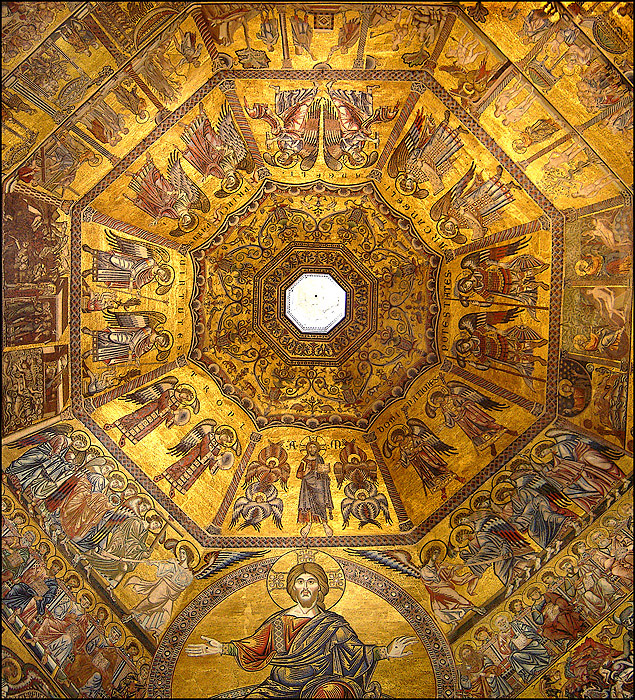
The ceiling mosaic of the Baptistery in Florence (c. 1240–1300) depicts (in the innermost octagon of images) all nine of the orders of angelic beings: the Seraphim and Cherubim are shown with Christ at lower center, while the other ranks each occupy a separate field, above which are their Latin designations.

The most influential angelic hierarchy was that put forward by Pseudo-Dionysius the Areopagite in the 5th or 6th century in his book De Coelesti Hierarchia (On the Celestial Hierarchy). Dionysius described nine levels of spiritual beings which he grouped into three orders:

- Highest orders
  Seraphim
  Cherubim (chayot)
  Thrones (ophanim, erelim)
- Middle orders
  Dominions (hashmallim)
  Virtues (malakim, tarshishim)
  Powers
- Lowest orders
  Principalities
  Archangels
  Angels

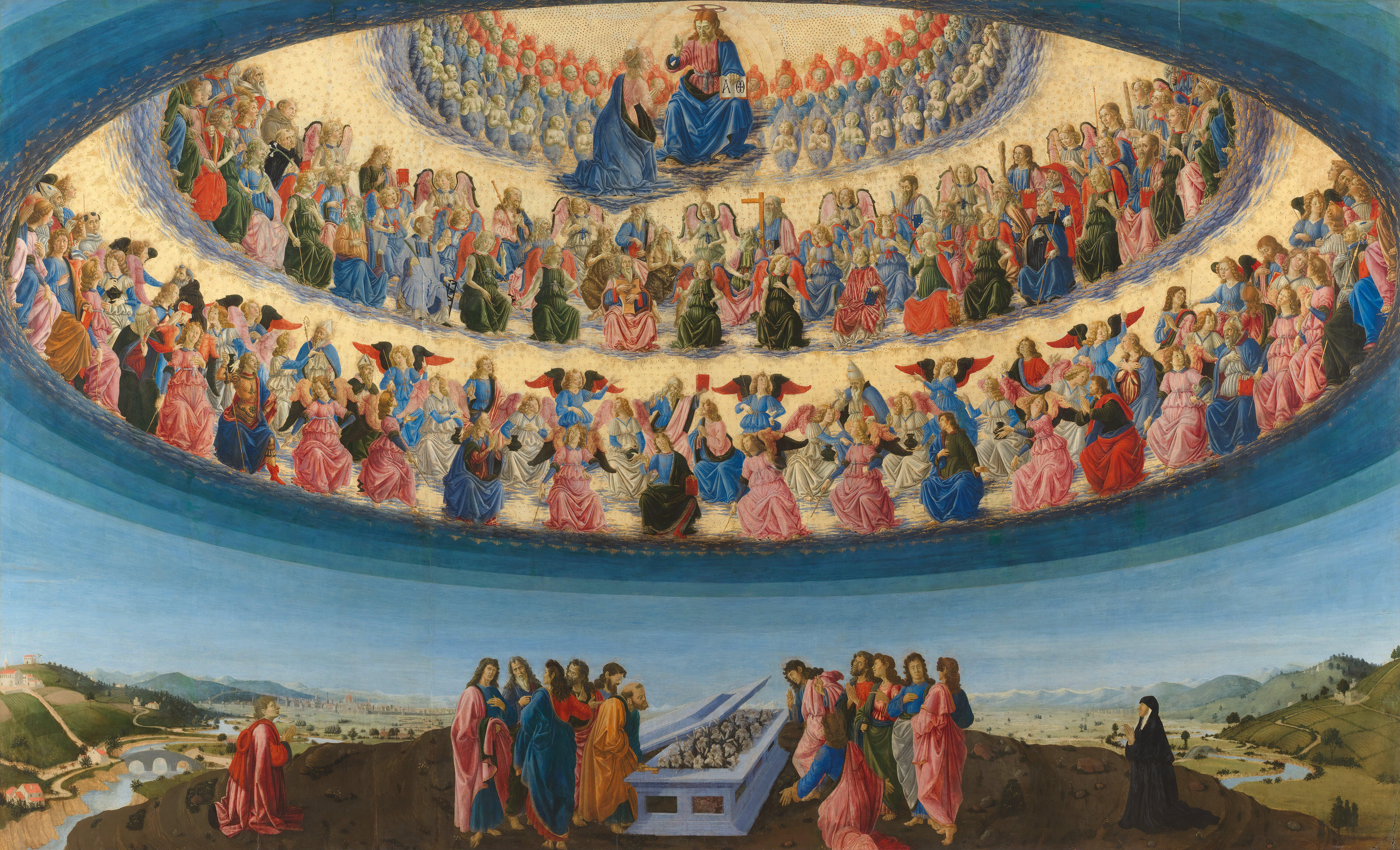
The Assumption of the Virgin by Francesco Botticini (1475–77) at the National Gallery London, shows three hierarchies and nine orders of angels, each with different characteristics.

During the Middle Ages, various schemes were proposed, some drawing on and expanding on Pseudo-Dionysius, others suggesting completely different classifications.

Pseudo-Dionysius (On the Celestial Hierarchy) and Thomas Aquinas (Summa Theologiae) drew on passages from the New Testament, specifically Ephesians 1:21 and Colossians 1:16, to develop a schema of three Hierarchies, Spheres or Triads of angels, with each Hierarchy containing three Orders or Choirs. Bonaventure summarized their nine offices as follows: announcing, declaring, and leading; regulating, enforcing, and commanding; receiving, revealing, and anointing. Thomas agreed with Jerome's commentary on Mt 18:10 that every living human possesses a guardian angel. Of the angelic orders, he asserted that only the lowest five are sent by God to manifest themselves in the corporeal world, while the four highest remain in Heaven at his presence.

The Chaplet of Saint Michael the archangel, a Catholic devotion also called the rosary of the angels, approved by Pope Pius IX, includes prayers and specific invocations for each of the nine choirs of angels.

=== Islam ===
There is no standard hierarchical organization in Islam that parallels the Christian division into different "choirs" or spheres, and the topic is not directly addressed in the Quran. However, it is clear that there is a set order or hierarchy that exists between angels, defined by the assigned jobs and various tasks to which angels are commanded by God. Some scholars suggest that Islamic angels can be grouped into fourteen categories, with some of the higher orders being considered archangels. Qazwini describes an angelic hierarchy in his Aja'ib al-makhluqat with Ruh on the head of all angels, surrounded by the four archangelic cherubim. Below them are the seven angels of the seven heavens.

Fakhr al-Din al-Razi (d. 1209) divided the angels into eight groups, which shows some resemblance to Christian angelology:

- Hamalat al-'Arsh, those who carry the 'Arsh (Throne of God), comparable to the Christian Seraphim.
- Muqarrabun (Cherubim), who surround the throne of God, constantly praising God (tasbīḥ)
- Archangels, such as Jibrāʾīl, Mīkhā'īl, Isrāfīl, and 'Azrā'īl
- Angels of Heaven, such as Riḍwan.
- Angels of Hell, Mālik and Zabānīya
- Guardian angels, who are assigned to individuals to protect them
- The angels who record the actions of people
- Angels entrusted with the affairs of the world, like the angel of thunder.

== Zoroastrian ==
There is an informal Zoroastrian angelic hierarchy, with the specific angelic beings called yazatas having key positions in the day-name dedications on the Zoroastrian calendar segregated into the ameshaspentas (the second to seventh of the 30 days of the month), yazatas and minoos (the last six of the 30 days of the month).

== Role-playing games ==
Angels are occasionally presented in role-playing games as having ordered hierarchies, within which higher level angels have more power and the ability to cast more spells or exercise other magical abilities. For example, Angels in Dungeons & Dragons, a subgroup of the beings called Celestials, come in three different types, the progressively more powerful Astral Deva, Planetar, and Solar. Another game which has summonable angels is Shin Megami Tensei, often classified under Divine, or Heralds. In the game series Bayonetta, Black Angels are supporting and all seven spheres are present, each divided in the same seven way as the traditional hierarchy.

== See also ==
- Christian demonology
- De Coelesti Hierarchia
- List of angels in theology
- Living creatures (Bible)
- Luminary (Gnosticism)
