= Celestial hierarchy =

Celestial hierarchy can refer to:

- Celestial bureaucracy, in Chinese mythology
- De Coelesti Hierarchia ("On the Celestial Hierarchy"), a 5th-century work by Pseudo-Dionysius the Areopagite
- Hierarchy of angels, systems of classifying and ranking angels
  - Angels in Judaism
  - Angels in Christianity
  - Angels in Islam
