= Cherub =

Heavenly beings who directly attend to God

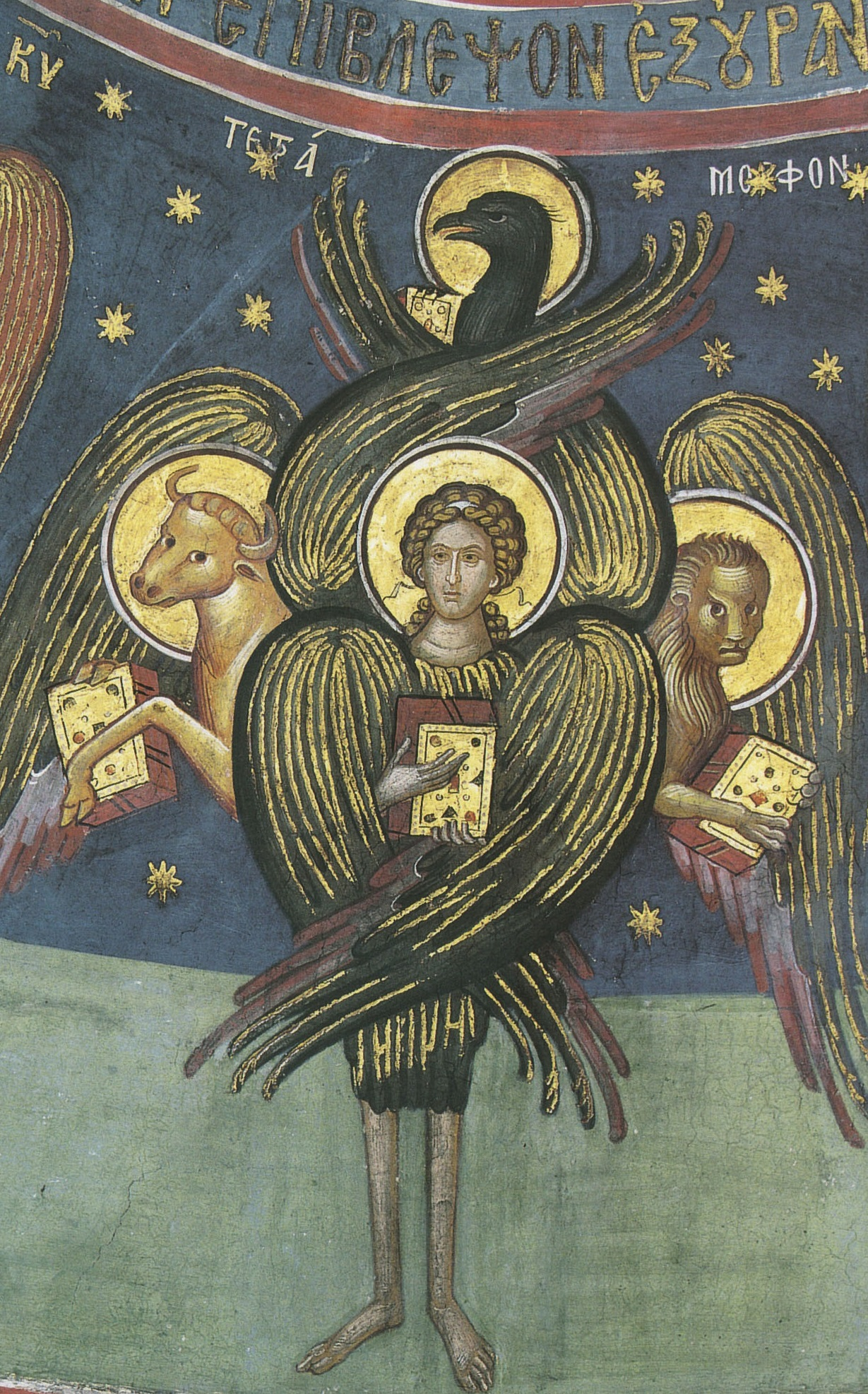
A tetramorph cherub, in Eastern Orthodox iconography

A cherub (/ˈtʃɛrəb/; pl.: cherubim; Hebrew: כְּרוּב kərūḇ, pl. כְּרוּבִים kərūḇīm) is one type of supernatural being in the Abrahamic religions. The numerous depictions of cherubim assign to them many different roles, such as protecting the entrance of the Garden of Eden.

== Etymology ==
Delitzch's Assyrisches Handwörterbuch (1896) connected the name keruv with Assyrian kirubu (a name of the shedu or lamassu) and karabu ("great, mighty").

Salomon Karppe (1897) glossed Babylonian karâbu as "propitious" rather than "mighty".

Stephen Herbert Langdon (1923) in his The Babylonian Epic of Creation, said: "karubu has the same meaning as karibu, 'one who prays', an image of a mythical monster placed at the gates of temples and palaces. This 'intercessor', a figure of a mythical monster, is clearly identical with the Hebrew kerub, cherub."

Dhorme (1926) similarly connected the Hebrew name to Assyrian kāribu (diminutive kurību), a term used to refer to intercessory beings (and statues of such beings) that plead with the gods on behalf of humanity with the literal meaning of "blesser".

The folk etymology connecting cherub to a Hebrew word for "youthful" is due to Abbahu (3rd century).

The Hebrew word was transliterated in Greek with a chi (χερουβ), and then in Latin with "ch". While "ch" in words coming from Greek are usually pronounced as a k in English (such as "chemistry" or "chela"), the "ch" in "cherub" is normally pronounced as in "church". According to Raanan Eichler, 'cherubim' may also relate to the Greek word 'grýps' (griphon).

== Abrahamic religious traditions ==
In Jewish angelic hierarchy, cherubim have the ninth (second-lowest) rank in Maimonides' Mishneh Torah (12th century), and the third rank in Kabbalistic works such as Berit Menuchah (14th century). The Christian work De Coelesti Hierarchia places them in the highest rank alongside Seraphim and Thrones.

The Book of Ezekiel, Chapters 1 and 10, speaks of Ezekiel seeing four "living creatures" ("chayot" in Hebrew), and in Chapter 10 he uses the word "cherub" or its plural, although it is not clear what the relationship is between the two. Based on Ezekiel's description the idea arose, as shown in (at least some) Christian icons, that a cherub has two pairs of wings and four faces: that of a lion (representative of all wild animals), an ox (domestic animals), a human (humanity), and an eagle (birds). In Chapter 10 the face of the ox is replaced by the face of a cherub (see below). As described by Ezekiel, "Their legs were straight, the soles of their feet like the hooves of a bull, gleaming like polished brass."

In Islam, al-karubiyyin "cherubim" or al-muqarrabin "the Close" refers to the highest angels near God, in contrast to the messenger angels. They include the Bearers of the Throne, the angels around the throne, and the archangels. The angels of mercy subordinative to Michael are also identified as cherubim. In Isma'ilism, there are Seven Archangels referred to as cherubim.

Later tradition ascribes to them a variety of physical appearances. Some early midrash literature conceives of them as non-corporeal. In Western Christian tradition, cherubim have become associated with the putto derived from Cupid in classical antiquity, resulting in depictions of cherubim as small, plump, winged boys.

Cherubim are also mentioned in the Second Treatise of the Great Seth, a 3rd-century Gnostic writing.

== Appearance ==
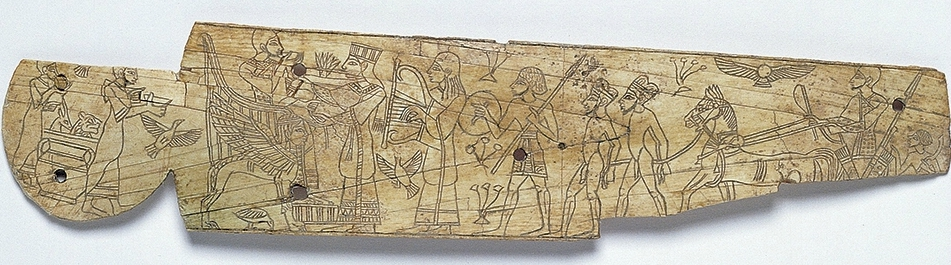
An ivory from Tel Megiddo showing a king sitting on a throne which is supplicated by a sphinx-esque winged hybrid.

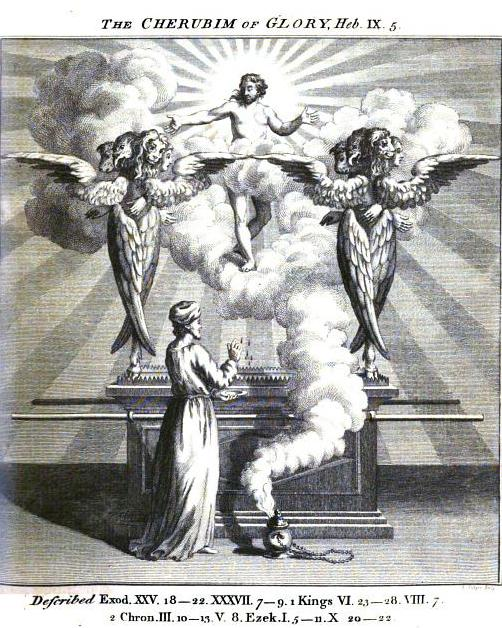
Depiction of the "cherubim of glory shadowing the mercy seat" (Julius Bate, 1773)

Aside from Ezekiel's vision, no detailed attestations of cherubim survive, and Ezekiel's description of the tetramorph being may not be the same as the cherubim of the historic Israelites. All that can be gleaned about the cherubim of the Israelites come from potential equivalents in the cultures which surrounded them.

The appearance of the cherubim continue to be a subject of debate. Mythological hybrids are common in the art of the Ancient Near East. One example is the Babylonian lamassu or shedu, a protective spirit with a sphinx-like form, possessing the wings of an eagle, the body of a lion or bull, and the head of a king. This was adopted largely in Phoenicia. The wings, because of their artistic beauty and symbolic use as a mark of creatures of the heavens, soon became the most prominent part, and animals of various kinds were adorned with wings; consequently, wings were bestowed also upon human forms, thus leading to the stereotypical image of an angel.

William F. Albright (1938) argued that "the winged lion with human head" found in Phoenicia and Canaan from the Late Bronze Age is "much more common than any other winged creature, so much so that its identification with the cherub is certain". A possibly related source is the human-bodied Hittite griffin, which, unlike other griffins, appear almost always not as a fierce bird of prey, but seated in calm dignity, like an irresistible guardian of holy things; some have proposed that the word griffin (γρύψ) may be cognate with cherubim (kruv > grups). While Ezekiel initially describes the tetramorph cherubim as having

the face of a man ... the face of a lion ... the face of an ox ... and ... the face of an eagle

in the tenth chapter this formula is repeated as

the face of the cherub ... the face of a man ... the face of a lion ... the face of an eagle

which (given that "ox" has apparently been substituted with "the cherub") some have taken to imply that cherubim were envisioned to have the head of a bovine.

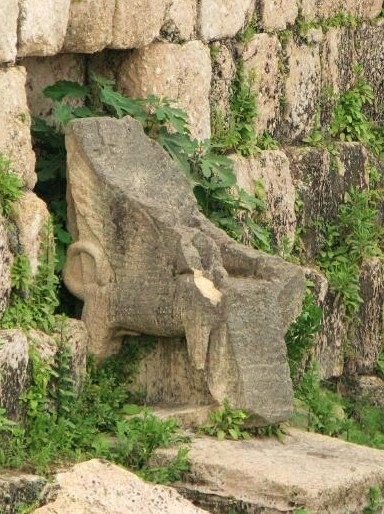
Throne of Astarte from the Temple of Eshmun, the legs formed by two winged hybrid creatures.

In particular resonance with the idea of cherubim embodying the throne of God, numerous pieces of art from Phoenicia, Ancient Egypt, and even Tel Megiddo in northern Israel depict kings or deities being carried on their thrones by hybrid winged creatures.

If this animalistic form is how the ancient Israelites envisioned cherubim, it raises more questions than it answers. For one, it is difficult to visualize the cherubim of the Ark of the Covenant as quadrupedal creatures with backward-facing wings, as these cherubim were meant to face each other and have their wings meet, while still remaining on the edges of the cover from which they were beaten. At the same time, these creatures have little to no resemblance to the cherubim in Ezekiel's vision.

On the other hand, even if cherubim had a more humanoid form, this still would not entirely match Ezekiel's vision and likewise seemingly clashes with the apparently equivalent archetypes of the cultures surrounding the Israelites, which almost uniformly depicted beings which served analogous purposes to Israel's cherubim as largely animalistic in shape. All of this may indicate that the Israelite conception of the cherub's appearance may not have been wholly consistent.

Nicolas Wyatt writes that motifs present in the Garden of Eden narrative, such as the trees, rivers, divine figures, the robed king, and the sphinxes and griffins were "clichés" in wider ancient Near Eastern iconography.

== Hebrew Bible ==
The cherubim are the most frequently occurring heavenly creature in the Hebrew Bible, as the Hebrew word appears 91 times. The first occurrence is in the Book of Genesis 3:24. Despite these many references, the role of the cherubim is never explicitly elucidated. While Israelite tradition must have conceived of the cherubim as guardians of the Garden of Eden in which they guard the way to the Tree of life, they are often depicted as performing other roles; for example in the Book of Ezekiel, they transport Yahweh's throne. The cherub who appears in the "Song of David", a poem which occurs twice in the Hebrew Bible, in 2 Samuel 22 and Psalm 18, participates in Yahweh's theophany and is imagined as a vehicle upon which the deity descends to earth from heaven to rescue the speaker (see 2 Samuel 22:11, Psalm 18:10).

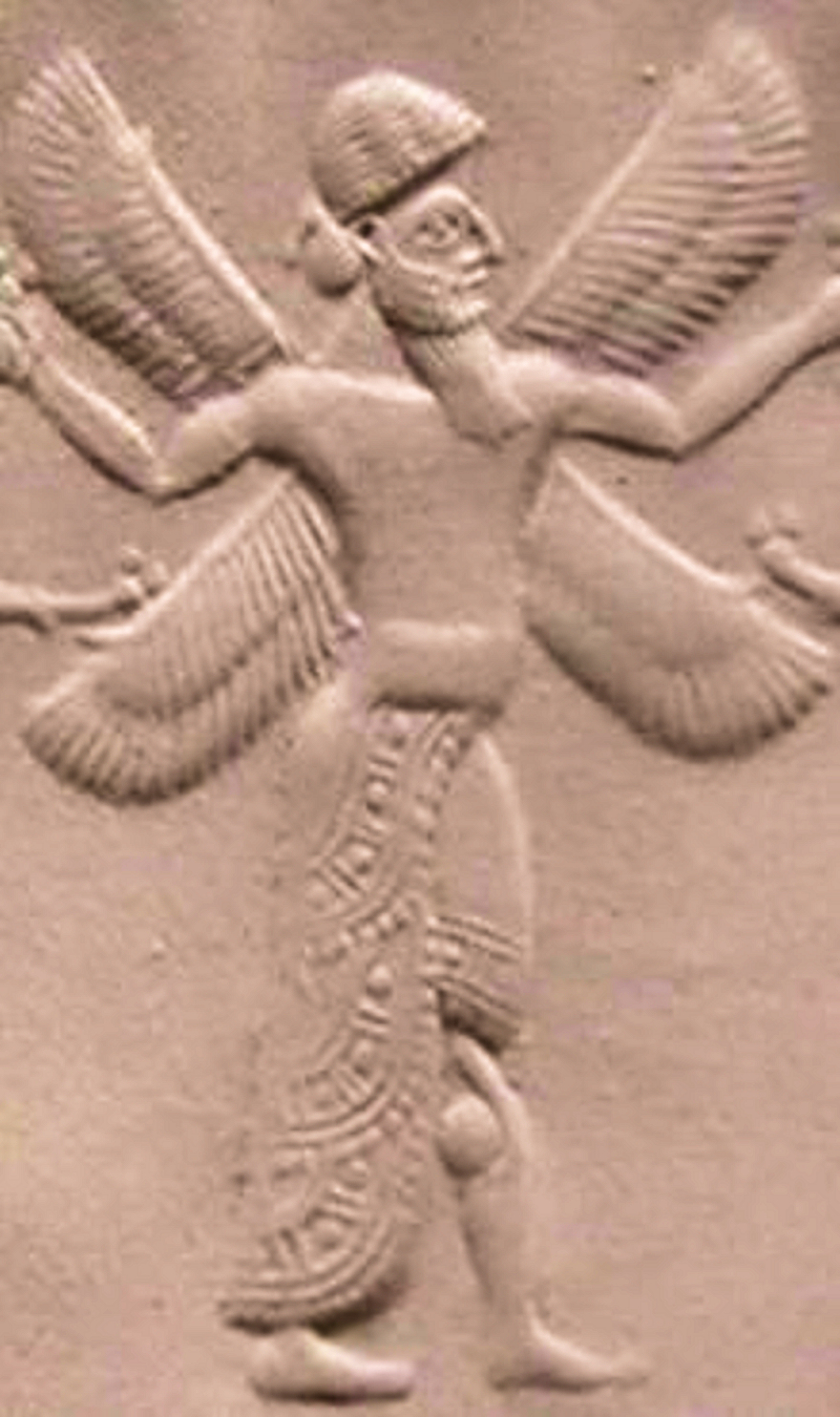
"Cherub" on a Neo-Assyrian Empire seal, c. 1000 – c. 612 BC

In Exodus 25:18–22, God tells Moses to make multiple images of cherubim at specific points around the Ark of the Covenant. Many appearances of the words cherub and cherubim in the Bible refer to the gold cherubim images on the mercy seat of the Ark, as well as images on the curtains of the Tabernacle and in Solomon's Temple, including two measuring ten cubits high.

In Isaiah 37:16, Hezekiah prays, addressing God as Hebrew: יֹשֵׁ֥ב כְּ֝רוּבִ֗ים, lit. 'enthroned above the cherubim', referring to the mercy seat. In regard to this same phrase, which also appears in 2 Kings 19, Eichler renders it "who dwells among the cherubim". Eichler's interpretation contrasts with common translations for many years, which have rendered it as "who sits upon the cherubim." This has implications for the understanding of whether the ark of the covenant in Solomon's Temple was Yahweh's throne or simply an indicator of Yahweh's immanence.

Cherubim feature at some length in Ezekiel. While they first appear in Ezekiel 1, in which they are transporting the throne of God by the Kebar (or Chebar, which was near Tel Abib in Nippur), they are not called "cherubim" until Ezekiel 10. In Ezekiel 1:5–11 they are described as having the likeness of a man and having four faces: that of a man, a lion (on the right side), and ox (on the left side), and an eagle. The four faces represent the four domains of God's rule: the man represents humanity, the lion represents wild animals, the ox represents domestic animals, and the eagle represents birds.

These faces peer out from the center of an array of four wings; these wings are joined to each other, two of which are stretched upward, and the other two cover their bodies. Under their wings are human hands; their legs are described as straight, and their feet like those of a calf, shining like polished brass. Between the creatures, glowing coals that moved between them could be seen; their fire "went up and down", and lightning burst forth from it. The cherubs also moved like flashes of lightning.

In Ezekiel 10, another detailed description of the cherubim appears, with slight variations in the details. Three of the four faces are the same – man, lion and eagle – but where chapter one has the face of an ox, Ezekiel 10:14 says "face of a cherub". Ezekiel equates the cherubim of chapter ten with the living creatures of chapter one in Ezekiel 10:15, "The cherubs ascended; those were the creatures (Hebrew: הַחַיָּ֔ה, romanized: haḥayyā) that I had seen by the Chebar Canal" and in 20:10, "They were the same creatures that I had seen below the God of Israel at the Chebar Canal; so now I knew that they were cherubs." In Ezekiel 41:18–20, they are portrayed as having two faces, although this is probably because they are depicted in profile.

== In Judaism ==
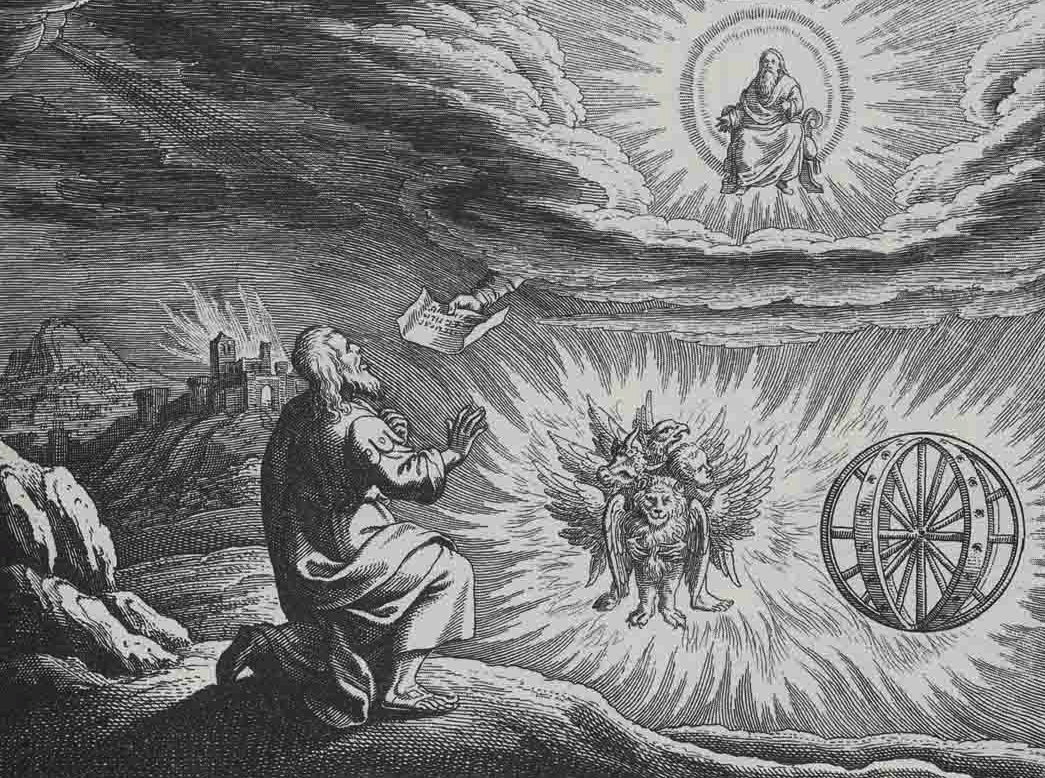
Ezekiel's "chariot vision" with the tetramorph (living creatures), engraving after an illustration by Matthäus Merian, Icones Biblicae (c. 1625 – c. 1630)

In rabbinic literature, the two cherubim are described as being human-like figures with wings, one a boy and the other a girl, placed on the opposite ends of the Mercy seat in the inner-sanctum of God's house. Solomon's Temple was decorated with Cherubs according to 1 Kings 6, and Aḥa bar Ya’akov claimed this was true of the Second Temple as well.

Many forms of Judaism include a belief in the existence of angels, including cherubim within the Jewish angelic hierarchy. The existence of angels is generally accepted within traditional rabbinic Judaism. There is, however, a wide range of beliefs within Judaism about what angels actually are and how literally one should interpret biblical passages associated with them.

In Kabbalah there has long been a strong belief in cherubim, the cherubim and other angels regarded as having mystical roles. The Zohar, a highly significant collection of books in Jewish mysticism, states that the cherubim were led by one of their number named Kerubiel.

On the other end of the philosophical spectrum is Maimonides, who had a neo-Aristotelian interpretation of the Bible. Maimonides writes that to the wise man, one sees that what the Bible and Talmud refer to as "angels" are actually allusions to the various laws of nature; they are the principles by which the physical universe operates.

For all forces are angels! How blind, how perniciously blind are the naive?! If you told someone who purports to be a sage of Israel that the Deity sends an angel who enters a woman's womb and there forms an embryo, he would think this a miracle and accept it as a mark of the majesty and power of the Deity, despite the fact that he believes an angel to be a body of fire one third the size of the entire world. All this, he thinks, is possible for God. But if you tell him that God placed in the sperm the power of forming and demarcating these organs, and that this is the angel, or that all forms are produced by the Active Intellect; that here is the angel, the "vice-regent of the world" constantly mentioned by the sages, then he will recoil.

— The Guide for the Perplexed II:4

For he [the naive person] does not understand that the true majesty and power are in the bringing into being of forces which are active in a thing although they cannot be perceived by the senses ... Thus the Sages reveal to the aware that the imaginative faculty is also called an angel; and the mind is called a cherub. How beautiful this will appear to the sophisticated mind, and how disturbing to the primitive.

— The Guide for the Perplexed II:6.

Maimonides says that the figures of the cherubim were placed in the sanctuary only to preserve among the people the belief in angels, there being two in order that the people might not be led to believe that they were the image of God.

Cherubim are discussed within the midrash literature. The two cherubim placed by God at the entrance of paradise were angels created on the third day, and therefore they had no definite shape; appearing either as men or women, or as spirits or angelic beings. The cherubim were the first objects created in the universe. The following sentence of the Midrash is characteristic:

When a man sleeps, the body tells to the soul (neshamah) what it has done during the day; the soul then reports it to the spirit (nefesh), the spirit to the angel, the angel to the cherub, and the cherub to the seraph, who then brings it before God".

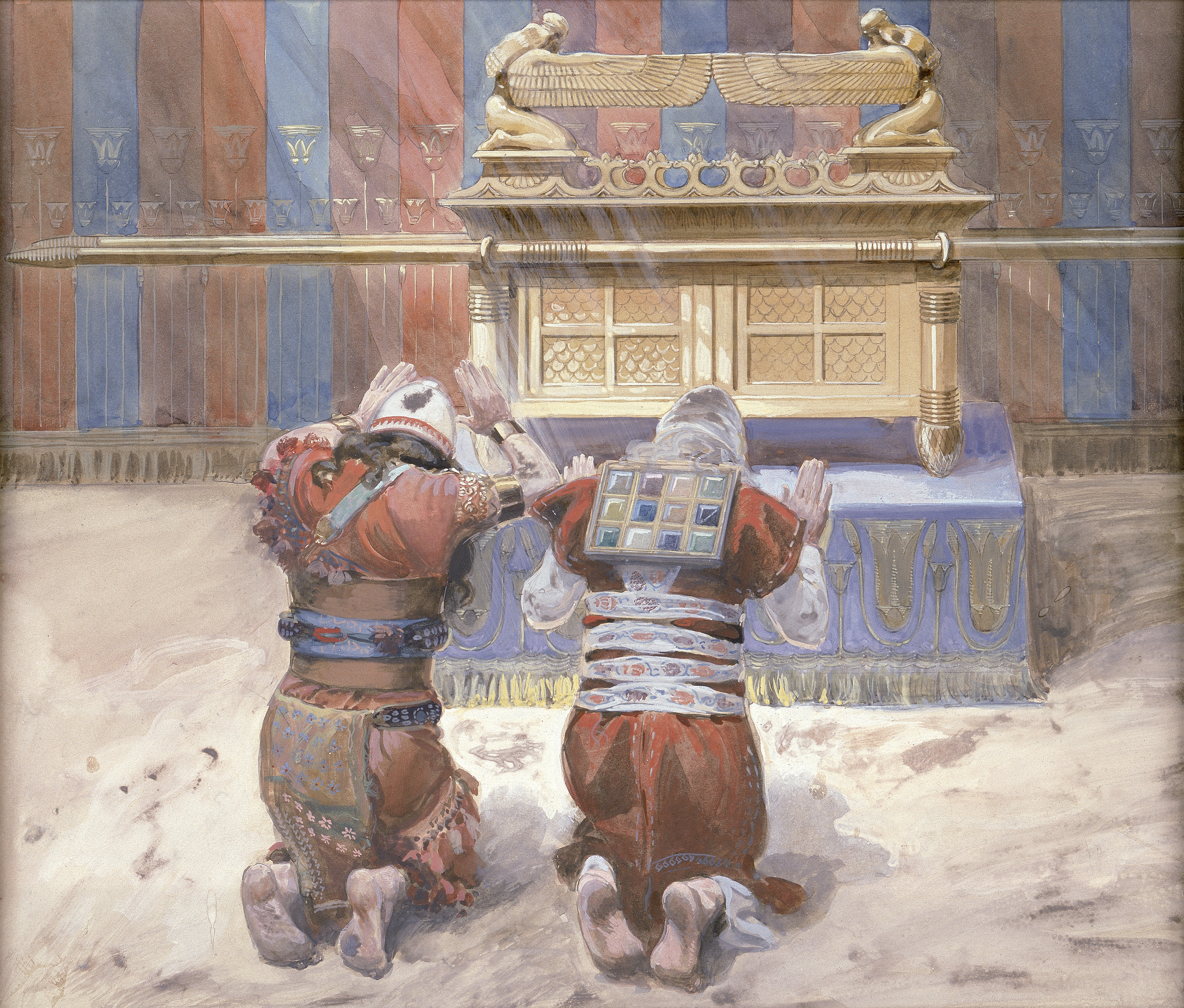
Moses and Joshua bowing before the Ark by James Tissot (c. 1900)

In early Jewish tradition there existed the notion that cherubim had youthful, human features, due to the etymologization of the name by Abbahu (3rd century). Before this, some early midrashic literature conceived of the cherubim as non-corporeal. In the first century AD, Josephus claimed:

No one can tell, or even conjecture, what was the shape of these cherubim.

A midrash states that when Pharaoh pursued Israel at the Red Sea, God took a cherub from the wheels of His throne and flew to the spot, for God inspects the heavenly worlds while sitting on a cherub. The cherub, however, is "something not material", and is carried by God, not vice versa.

In the passages of the Talmud that describe the heavens and their inhabitants, the seraphim, ofanim, and living creatures are mentioned, but not the cherubim; and the ancient liturgy also mentions only these three classes.

In the Talmud, Jose the Galilean holds that when the Birkat Hamazon (grace after meals) is recited by at least ten thousand seated at one meal, a special blessing

Blessed is Ha-Shem our God, the God of Israel, who dwells between the cherubim

is added to the regular liturgy.

== In Christianity ==
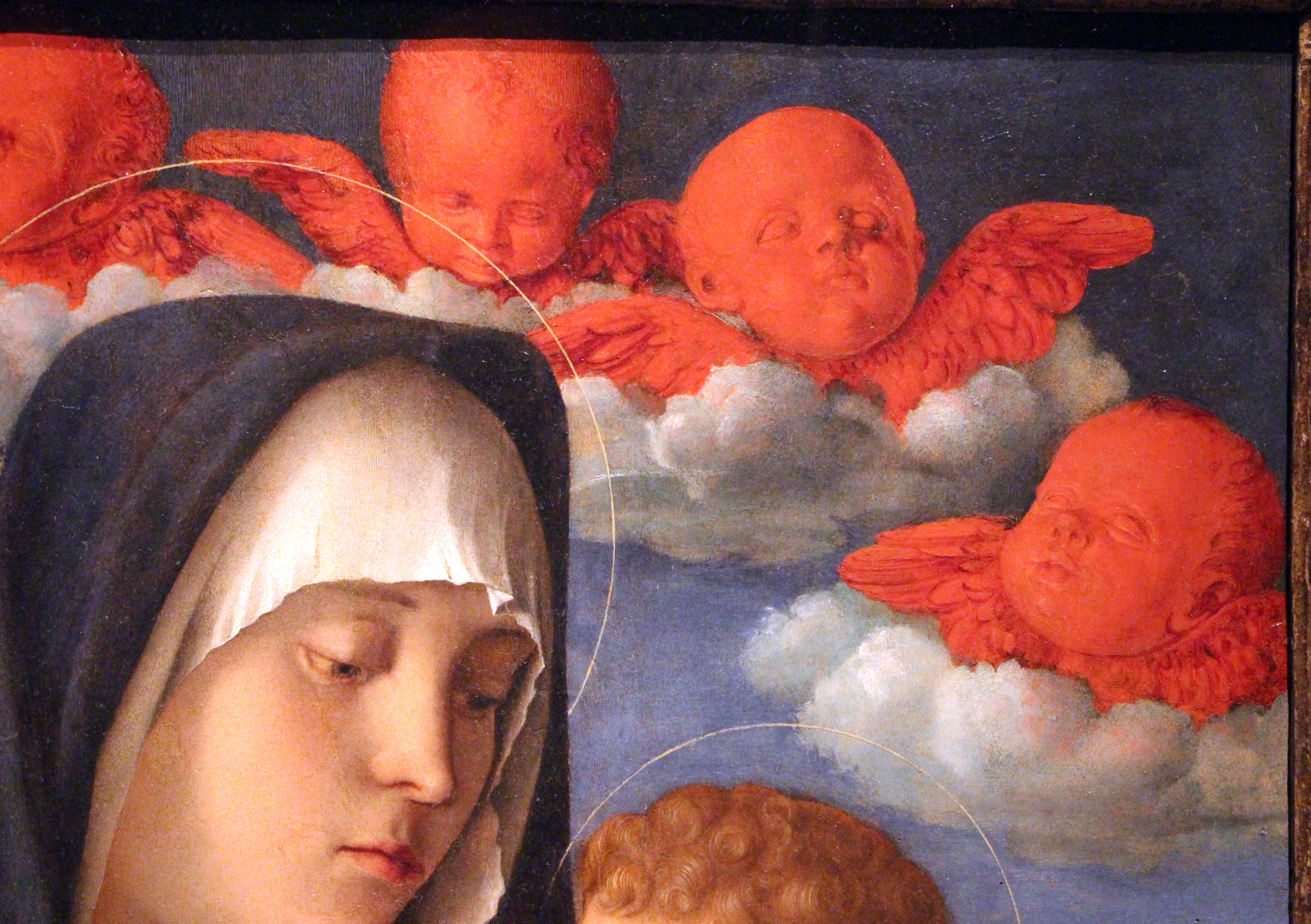
Cherubs around the Virgin and Child, detail of Madonna of the Red Cherubim, 1485 by Giovanni Bellini

In the Book of Genesis, the Cherubim were introduced:

So he drove out the man; and he placed at the east of the garden of Eden Cherubims, and a flaming sword which turned every way, to keep the way of the tree of life.

– Genesis 3:24

They were further described throughout the Old Testament, especially in the Book of Chronicles and Ezekiel respectively:

And the priests brought in the ark of the covenant of the Lord unto his place, to the oracle of the house, into the most holy place, even under the wings of the cherubims:
For the cherubims spread forth their wings over the place of the ark, and the cherubims covered the ark and the staves thereof above.

– 2 Chronicles 5:7–8

And every one had four faces: the first face was the face of a cherub, and the second face was the face of a man, and the third the face of a lion, and the fourth the face of an eagle.

– Ezekiel 10:14

In Medieval theology, following the writings of Pseudo-Dionysius, the cherubim are the second highest rank in the angelic hierarchy, following the seraphim and preceding the Thrones. Cherubim are regarded in traditional Christian angelology as angels of the second highest order of the ninefold celestial hierarchy. De Coelesti Hierarchia (c. 5th century) lists them alongside Seraphim and Thrones. According to Thomas Aquinas, the cherubim are characterized by knowledge, in contrast to seraphim, who are characterized by their "burning love to God".

In Western art, cherubim became associated with the putto and the Greco-Roman god Cupid/Eros, with depictions as small, plump, winged boys. Artistic representations of cherubim in Early Christian and Byzantine art sometimes diverged from scriptural descriptions. The earliest known depiction of the tetramorph cherubim is the 5th–6th century apse mosaic found in the Thessalonian Church of Hosios David. This mosaic is an amalgamation of Ezekiel's visions in Ezekiel 1:4–28, Ezekiel 10:12, Isaiah's seraphim in Isaiah 6:13 and the six-winged creatures of Revelation from Revelation 4:2–10.

== In Islam ==
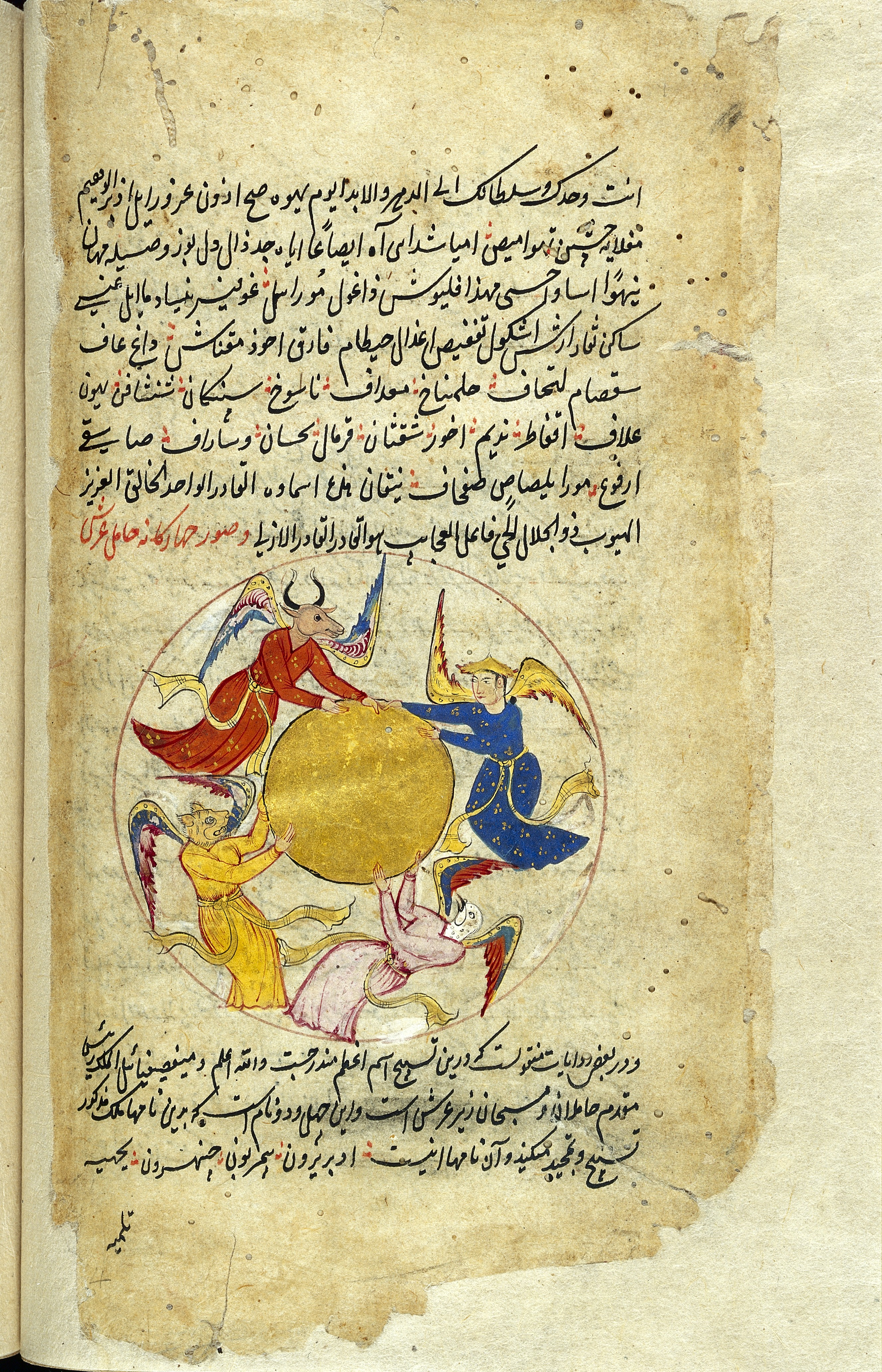
The four supporters (angels) of the celestial throne in Islamic arts

Al-Karubiyyin, according to the Quran, are identified as a class of al-muqarrabin, and are a class of angels near the presence of God. They are entrusted with praising God and interceding for humans. They are usually identified either with a class of angels separate or include various angels absorbed in the presence of God: the canonical four Islamic archangels Jibra'il, Mika'il, Azra'el, and Israfil, the actual cherubim and the Bearers of the Throne. They are frequently mentioned in the ibn Abbas version of Muhammad's Night Journey.

Some scholars had a more precise approach: ibn Kathir distinguishes between the angels of the throne and the cherubim. In a 13th–14th-century work called "Book of the Wonders of Creation and the peculiarities of Existing Things", the cherubim belong to an order below the Bearers of the Throne, who in turn are identified with seraphim instead. Abu Ishaq al-Tha'labi places the cherubim as the highest angels only next to the Bearers of the Throne. Similarly, Fakhr al-Din al-Razi distinguishes between the angels carrying the throne (seraphim) and the angels around the throne (cherubim).

The Quran mentions the Muqarrabin in An-Nisa verse 172, angels who worship God and are not proud. Further, cherubim appear in Miraj literature and the Qisas al-Anbiya. The cherubim around the throne are continuously praising God with the tasbih: "Glory to God!" They are described as bright as no one of the lower angels can envision them. Cherubim as angels of mercy, created by the tears of Michael, are not identified with the angels in God's presence, but of lower rank. They too, request God to pardon humans. In contrast to the messenger angels, the cherubim (and seraphim) always remain in the presence of God. If they stop praising God, they fall.

The Twelver Shi'a scholar Mohammad-Baqer Majlesi narrates about a fallen cherub encountered by Muhammad in the form of a snake. The snake tells him that he did not perform dhikr (remembrance of God) for a moment so God was angry with him and cast him down to earth in the form of a snake. Then Muhammad went to Hasan and Husayn. Together they interceded (tawassul) for the angel and God restored him to his angelic form. A similar story appears in Tabari's Bishara. An angel called Futrus, described as an "angel-cherub" (malak al-karubiyyin), was sent by God, but since the angel failed to complete his task in time, God broke one of his wings. Muhammad interceded for the cherub, and God forgave the fallen angel, whereupon he became the guardian for Hussain's grave.

== See also ==
- Ambrosian Hymn
- Angels in Christianity
- Buraq
- Cherubism (medical condition)
- Chimera
- Gandharva
- Kamadeva
- Lamassu
- List of angels in theology
- List of mythological hybrids
- Merkabah mysticism
