= Living creatures (Bible) =

Class of heavenly beings

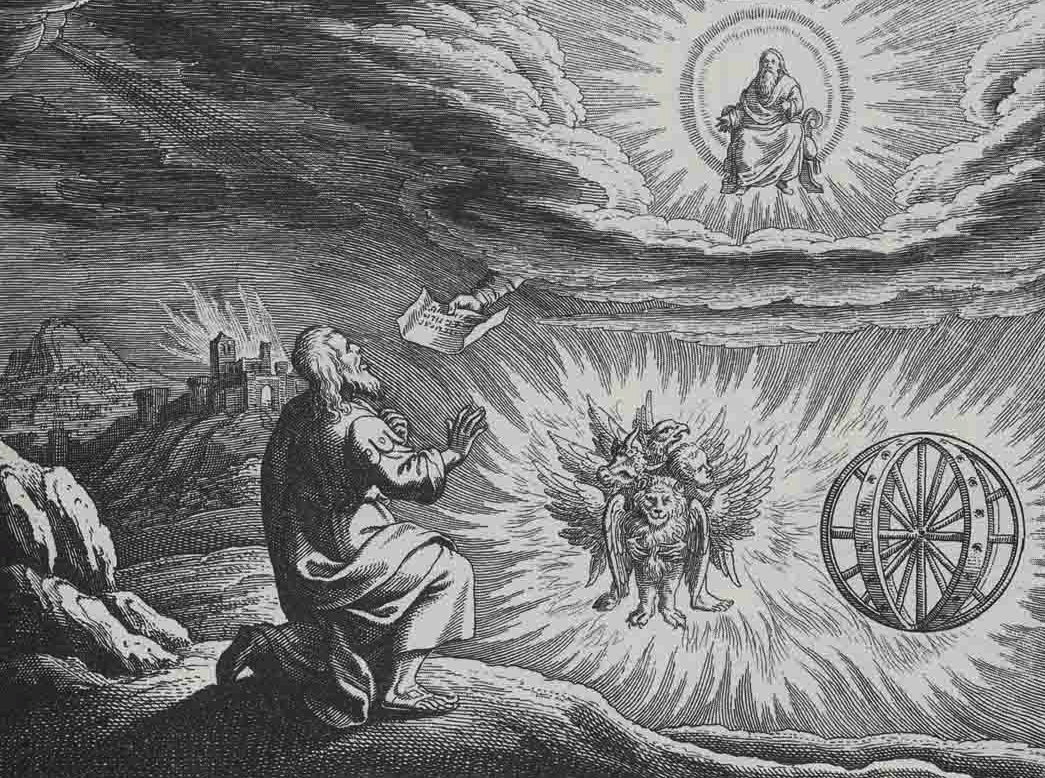
Ezekiel's "chariot vision", by Matthaeus Merian (1593–1650)

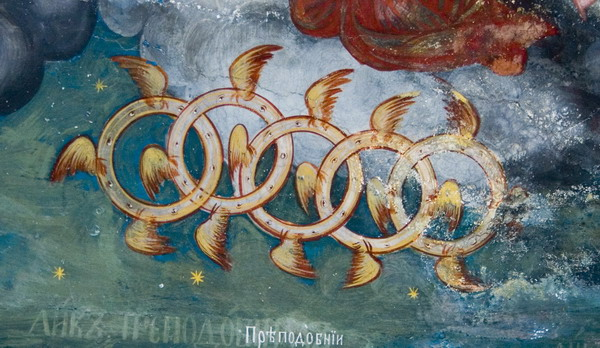
Ezekiel's Wheel

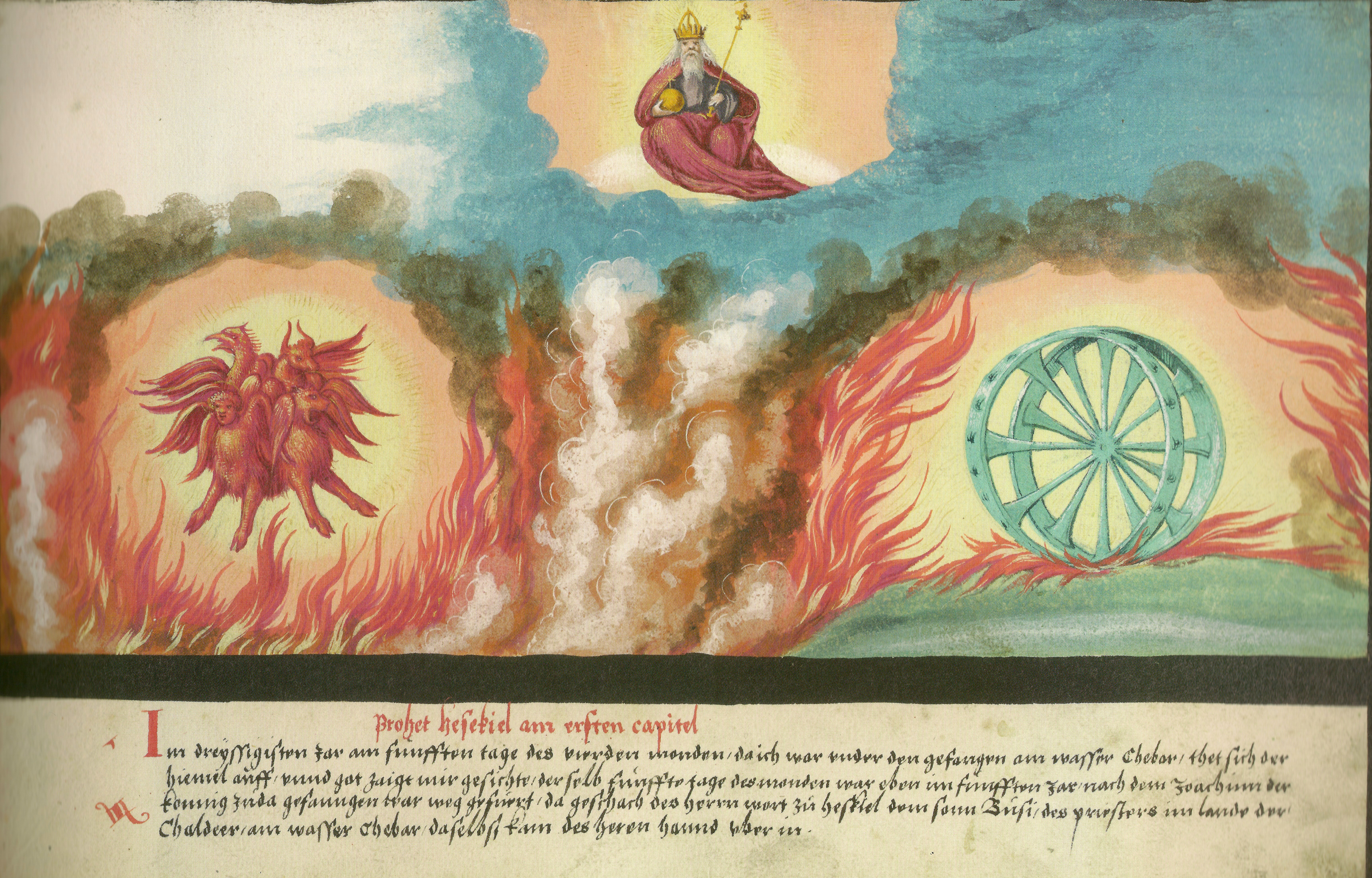
Ezekiel's encounter with the Merkabah and the Living Creatures

The living creatures, living beings, or chayyoth (Hebrew: חַיּוֹת, romanized: ḥayyōṯ) are a class of heavenly beings in Judaism. They are described in the prophet Ezekiel's vision of the heavenly chariot in the first and tenth chapters of the Book of Ezekiel. References to the sacred creatures recur in texts of Second Temple Judaism, in rabbinical merkabah ("chariot") literature, in the Book of Revelation in the Christian New Testament, and in the Zohar.

According to Jewish and Christian traditions, there are four living creatures, although their description varies by source. The symbolic depiction of the four living creatures in religious art, especially Christian art, is called a tetramorph.

== Ezekiel's four living creatures ==
Ezekiel's vision of the four living creatures in Ezekiel 1 are identified as cherubim in Ezekiel 10, who are God's throne bearers. Cherubim as minor guardian deities of temple or palace thresholds are known throughout the Ancient East. In Ezekiel 1, each of Ezekiel's cherubim have four faces, that of a man, a lion, an ox, and an eagle. In Ezekiel 10:14, they have the face of a cherub, the face of a man, the face of a lion, and the face of an eagle. However, the fact that they manifest in human form sets them apart from the griffin-like cherubs and lamassu of Babylonia and Assyria. Concerning their ability to move, Ezekiel's cherubim do not need to turn, since they face all compass points simultaneously. This description of movement differs from that of the seraphim in Isaiah's vision (Isaiah 6:2) who have an extra set of wings, giving them the ability to fly.

== Revelation's four living beings ==
In the New Testament book of Revelation 4:6–8, four living beings (Greek: ζῷον, zōion) are seen in John's vision. These appear as a lion, an ox, a man, and an eagle, much as in Ezekiel but in a different order. They have six wings, whereas Ezekiel's four living creatures are described as having four. In verse 6, they are said to have "eyes all over, front and back", suggesting that they are alert and knowledgeable, that nothing escapes their notice. The description parallels the wheels that are beside the living creatures in Ezekiel 1:18; 10:12, which are said to be "full of eyes all around". The Hebrew word for "wheel" was also used in later Jewish literature to indicate a member of the angelic orders (1 Enoch 71:7; 3 Enoch 1:8; 7:1; 25:5–6, etc.).

Comparing the living creatures in Ezekiel with Revelation's is a prominent apocalyptic study in Western Christianity. An example is the 18th-century works of Jonathan Edwards' recorded interpretation of 1722/23. The four living creatures that John of Patmos sees in the Book of Revelation is the author's reworking of the living creatures in the visions of Ezekiel (Ezekiel 1:5–28) and Isaiah (Isaiah 6:2).

William D. Mounce noted a belief that the living creatures may have been associated with the four principal (or fixed) signs of the zodiac (Taurus, Leo, Scorpio, and Aquarius), (Note: This association can be seen on the tarot card The World, for example, in the Etteilla deck.) but other scholars have doubted this interpretation. (Note: Smalley 2012, p. 120: "It is most unlikely that the four living creatures are to be identified with either the four constellations of stars (cf. Charles 1, 123), or the four principal signs of the zodiac (cf. Mounce 124 n. 26).")

In a critical analysis of John's vision, April De Conick's 2006 essay outlines that the hayyot in Ezekiel are perhaps not original with the author of Revelation. De Conick suggests that John may have drawn from other merkabah-related texts and by subtly working with images already known to his audience, he reshaped them for his own purposes. With John blending and transforming the images of his sources, it has given way to different interpretations.

== Religious views ==
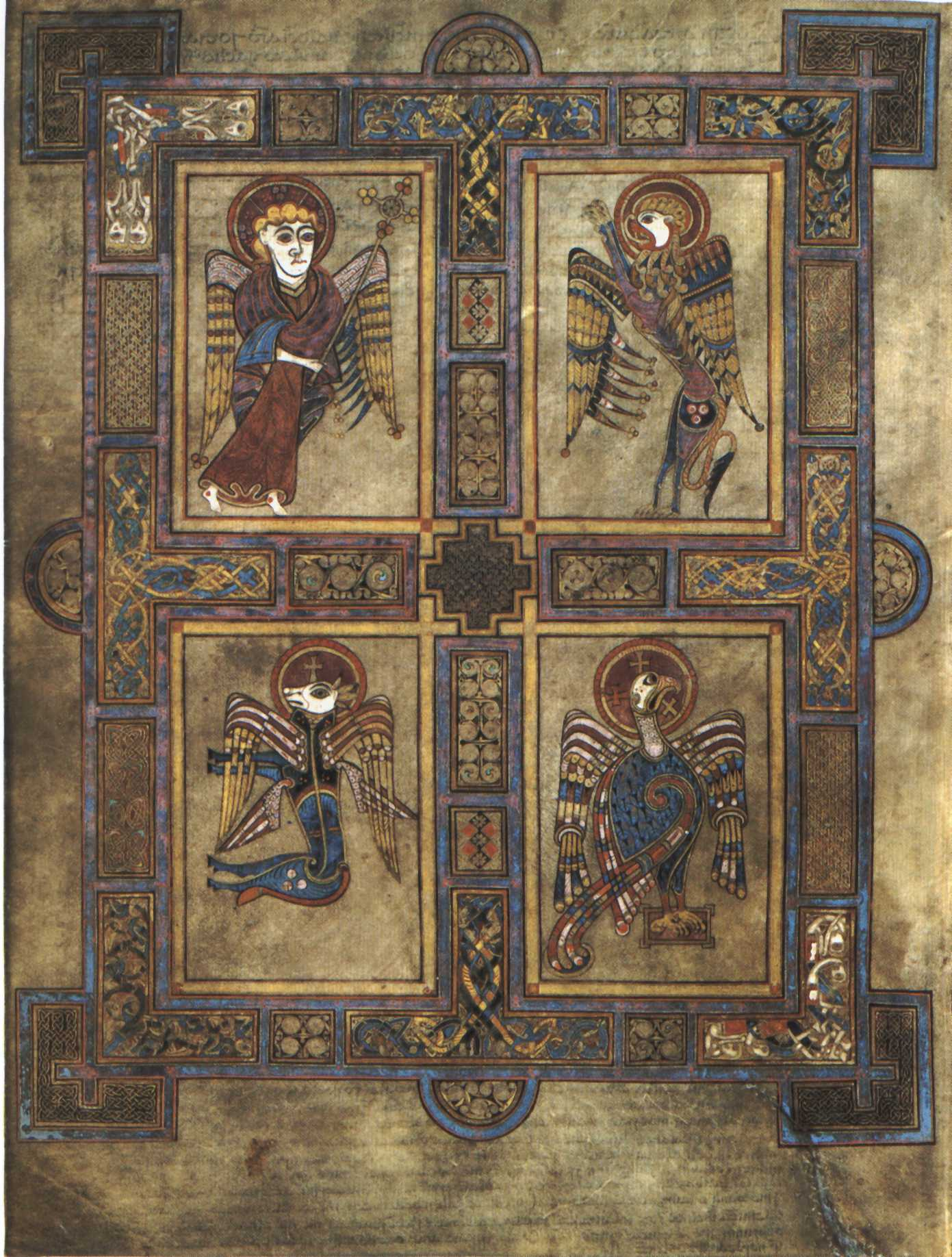
The living creatures as depicted in the Book of Kells. In Christianity, they are commonly associated with the Four Evangelists.

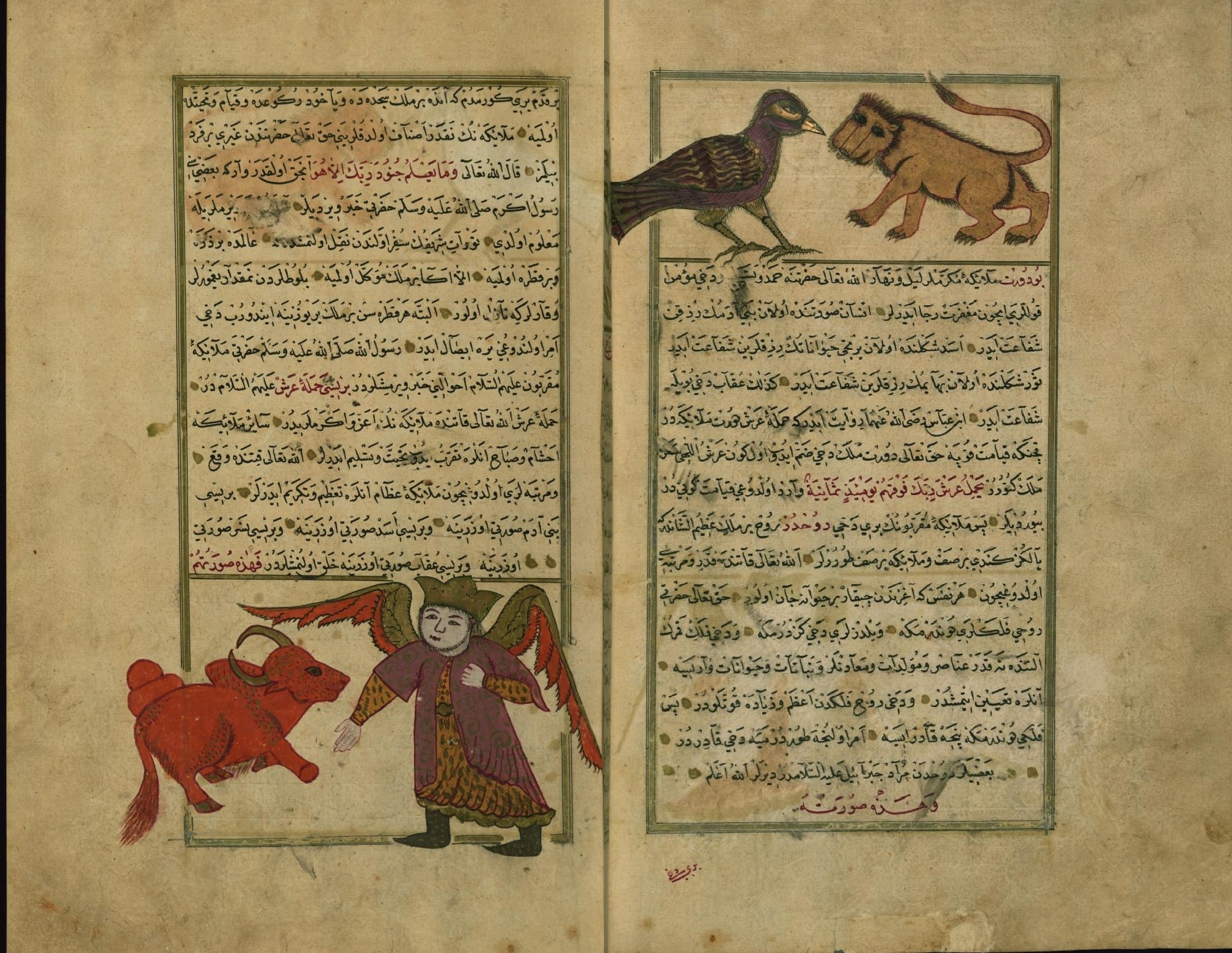
The four firmament bearers depicted in Qazvin's book Aja'ib al-Makhluqat or The Wonders of Creatures and the Marvels of Creation (13th century).

In Judaism, the living beings are considered angels of fire, who hold up the throne of God. According to the Zohar, they hold up the firmament itself. They are ranked first in Maimonides' Jewish angelic hierarchy. They have also been correlated with four archangels: Michael is the "lion-headed", Raphael the "human-headed", Uriel the "bull-headed", and Gabriel the "eagle-headed".

In Christianity, the four living creatures are Cherubim. A prominent early interpretation, variously modified by different interpreters, has been to equate the four creatures with the Four Evangelists. Throughout church history, the most common interpretation (first laid out by Victorinus), but not the original or the only, is that the lion represents Mark, the calf Luke, the man Matthew, and the eagle John. Irenaeus was the first to make the association with the evangelists, but the interpretation laid out by Victorinus and adopted by Jerome, Gregory the Great, and the Book of Kells became dominant. Its influence has been on art and sculpture and is still prevalent in Catholicism and Anglicanism. A view held by many modern commentators is that the four living creatures of Revelation are agents of God and heavenly representatives of the created order, who call every living thing to worship the Creator.

A traditional view is that the four faces (Revelation 4:6-8) refer to the many aspects (or attributes) of Jesus Christ as depicted in the four Gospels.

The Man

The man represents Jesus as the Son of Man, symbolizing His humanity, vulnerability, and compassion. This face is often associated with Jesus' role as the Son of Man, who came to seek and save the lost. The man is also a symbol of wisdom, understanding, and empathy.

The Ox

The ox represents Jesus as the Obedient Servant, symbolizing His humility, submission, and willingness to serve. This face is often associated with Jesus' role as the Servant of the Lord, who came to serve and give His life as a ransom for many. The ox is also a symbol of strength, endurance, and sacrifice.

The Lion

The lion represents Jesus as the Lion of Judah, symbolizing His power, strength, and royalty. This face is often associated with Jesus' role as the Messiah, the King of Kings, and the one who will judge the world. The lion is also a symbol of courage, bravery, and protection.

The Eagle

The eagle represents Jesus as the Son of God, symbolizing His divinity, majesty, and power. This face is often associated with Jesus' role as the Son of God, who came to reveal the Father's love and glory. The eagle is also a symbol of freedom, strength, and vision.

These four faces of Jesus are not mutually exclusive, but rather complementary, reflecting the multifaceted nature of Jesus' character and ministry. Each face represents a different aspect of His personality, role, and mission, and together they form a complete picture of who Jesus is and what He has done for us.

Another view found in a popular Greek Orthodox Catechism, is that the living creatures represent four covenants given to mankind. The lion represents the Noahic covenant in the sign of the rainbow, the ox represents the Abrahamic covenant of circumcision, the man represents Moses giving the law, and the eagle represents the new covenant Gospel of Christ.

== Secular views ==
It has been proposed that the phenomena described in Ezekiel were halos caused by ice crystals in the atmosphere, such as sun dogs.

== See also ==
- Anemoi – Group of Greek gods
- Eye of Horus – Ancient Egyptian symbol of protection, royal power and good health
- Four Dwarves (Norse mythology) – Four dwarfs who hold up the sky in Nordic mythology
- Four Heavenly Kings – Buddhist gods
- Four Holy Beasts – Four sacred animals in Chinese mythology
- Four sons of Horus – Ancient Egyptian gods
- Four Stags (Norse mythology) – Four stags in the Poetic Edda
- Four Symbols – Mythological creatures in Chinese constellations
- Four temperaments – Proto-psychological theory
- Guardians of the directions – Deities of the eight directions in Hinduism and Buddhism
- Lokapala – Guardians or kings of the cardinal directions
- Royal stars – Persian definition in astronomy
- Tetramorph – Symbolic arrangement of four differing elements
