= Bearers of the Throne =

Group of angels in Islam

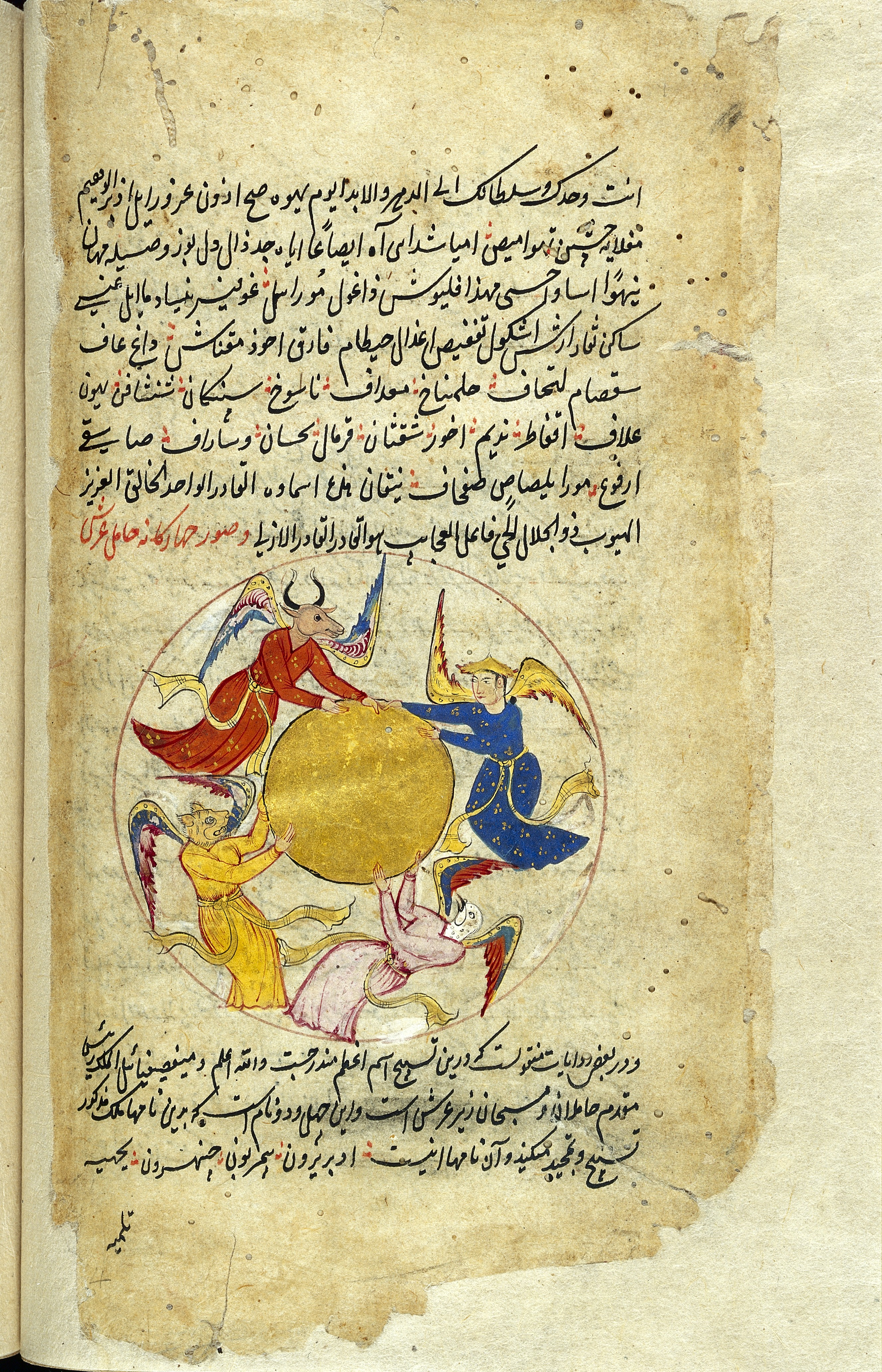
The four supporters (angels) of the celestial throne

Bearers of the Throne, also known as the ḥamlat al-arsh (Arabic: حملة العرش, romanized: Ḥamālat al - Arsh), are a group of angels in Islam.

The Quran mentions them in Quran 40:7 and Quran 69:17. They are mentioned in the al-Sahifa al-Sajjadiyya, a book of prayers attributed to Ali ibn Husayn Zayn al-Abidin.

== Description ==
In Islamic tradition, the Hamalat al-Arsh are a group of angels whose sole task is to bear the Throne of God. According to Muqatil ibn Sulayman, the angels of the throne are the first angels God created.

Ibn Abbas is reported as saying, that the number of this angels are four but at Day of resurrection, they will increase to eight.

They are often portrayed in zoomorphic forms. Al-Suyuti who quoted Wahb ibn Munabbih, and Al-Bayhaqi in book of al Asma' wa al Sifat, that each of those different anthropomorphic angels has four faces of a human, bull, vulture, and lion. Other hadiths describe them with six wings and four faces. Meanwhile, al-Suyuti narrated the Hamalat al-Arsh has four wings.

According to a hadith transmitted from At-Targhib wat-Tarhib authored by ʻAbd al-ʻAẓīm ibn ʻAbd al-Qawī al-Mundhirī, the bearers of the throne shaped like a rooster, with their feet on the earth and their nape supporting the Throne of God in the highest sky. (Note: The hadith were: "...Allah, the most exalted, has permitted me to speak of a rooster whose legs have separated the earth, and its neck is bent under the throne..." through the narration of Abu Hurairah by Abd al-Qawi al-Mundhiri through Al-Qadi Abu Ya'la. The Hadith were judged as authentic and sound by numerous hadith scholars such as by Nur al-Din al-Haythami in his work, Majma al-Zawa'id, Al-Tabarani in his work, Al-Mu'jam al-Awsat, Mustafa al-Adawi in Sahih Al-Ahadith Al-Qudsi and also by Muhammad Nasiruddin al-Albani in his work Silsalat al-Hadith as-Sahihah It also commented as safe as it is also supported by other Hadith from another chain from Jabir ibn Abd Allah in the Sunan Abu Dawood.) a number modern Islamic scholars from Imam Mohammad Ibn Saud Islamic University, and other institutes in Yemen and Mauritania also agreed the soundness of this hadith by quoting a commentary from Ibn Abi al-Izz, a classical era scholar.

These four angels are also held to be created from four different elements: light, fire, water, and mercy. in his commentary about Al-Aqida al-Tahawiyya, Ibn Abi al-Izz has quoted a hadith regarding the physical size of the angel which authored by Abu Dawud al-Sijistani, It is also said they are so large that a journey from their earlobes to their shoulders would take seven hundred years.

According to al-Suyuti who quoted a Hadith transmitted by Ibn al-Mubarak, archangel Israfil is one of the bearers of the throne.

== Similar beings in other religions ==
The portrayal of these angels is comparable to the seraphim in the Book of Revelation. They might be identified with cherubim or seraphim of Jewish traditions.

== See also ==
- Tetramorph
- List of angels in theology
