= Hashmal =

Angelic entity in Judaism

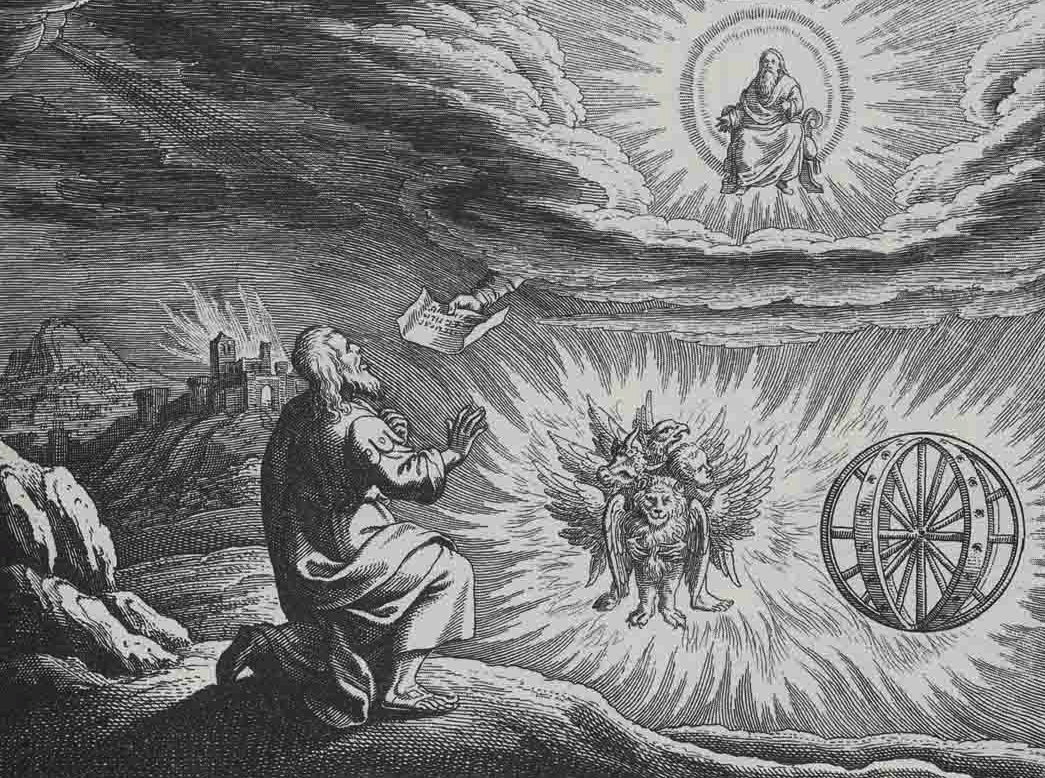
Ezekiel's "chariot vision", by Matthaeus Merian (1593–1650)

The Hashmallim (Hebrew: חַשְׁמַלִּים Ḥašmallīm; sing. Hashmal, חַשְׁמַל Ḥašmal; rendered amber by the Authorized Version) are angelic entities in Judaism.

The word hashmal appears in the Hebrew Bible in Ezekiel 1:4-5:

And I looked, and, behold, a stormy wind came out of the north, a great cloud, with a fire flashing up, so that a brightness was round about it; and out of the midst thereof as the colour of electrum, out of the midst of the fire. And out of the midst thereof came the likeness of four living creatures. And this was their appearance: they had the likeness of a man.

Hashmallim occupy the fourth rank of ten in Maimonides' exposition of the Jewish angelic hierarchy.

The Septuagint translates hashmal to ηλεκτρον (elektron), which means "amber" in English. Later, hashmal became the Modern Hebrew word that translates to the English word "electricity". Jewish poet Judah Leib Gordon coined the modern Hebrew word, in his 1878 collection Gabashta.

== See also ==
- List of angels in theology
- Merkabah mysticism
