= Angels in Christianity =

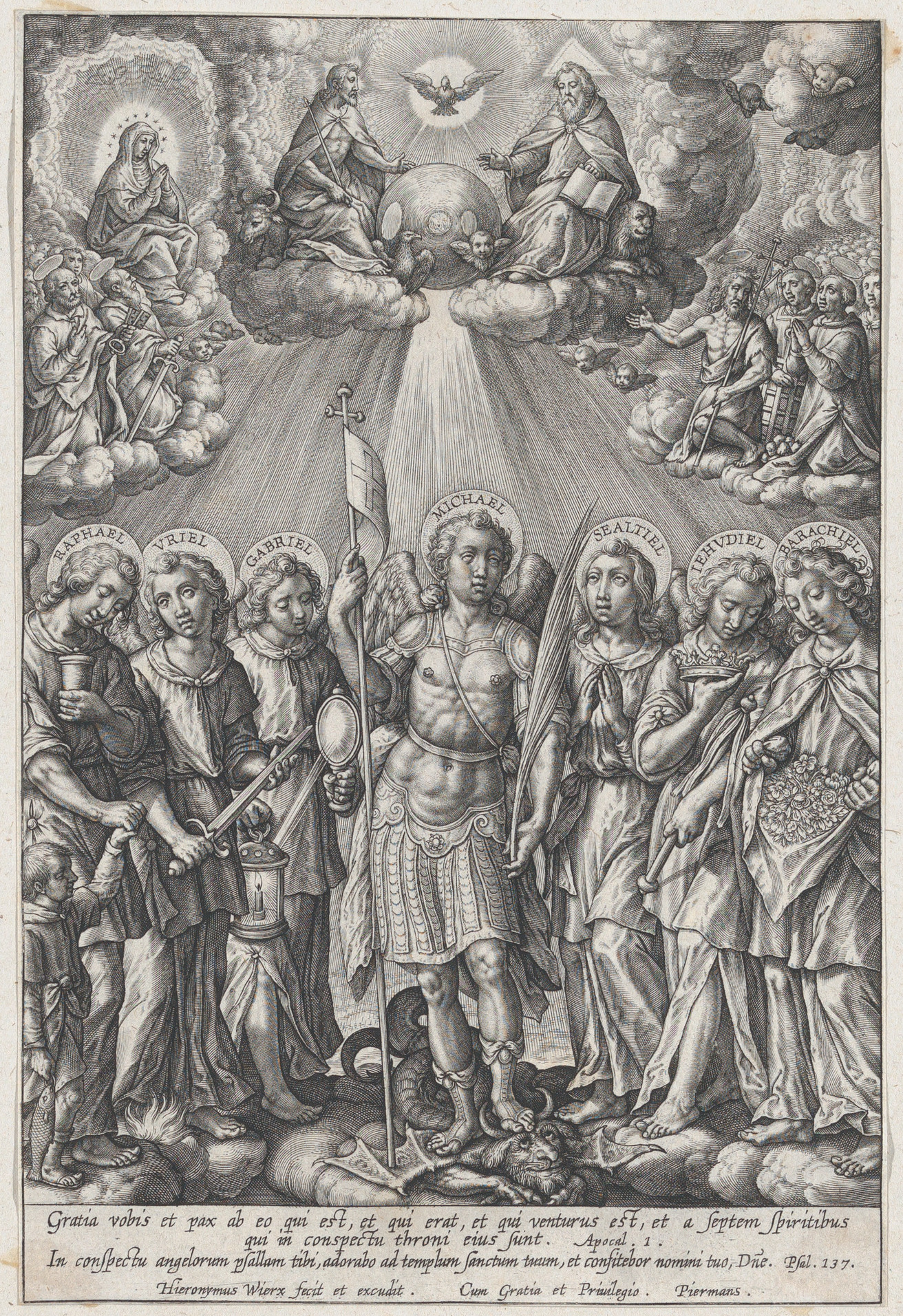
The seven archangels, Hieronymus Wierix, 1570–1619

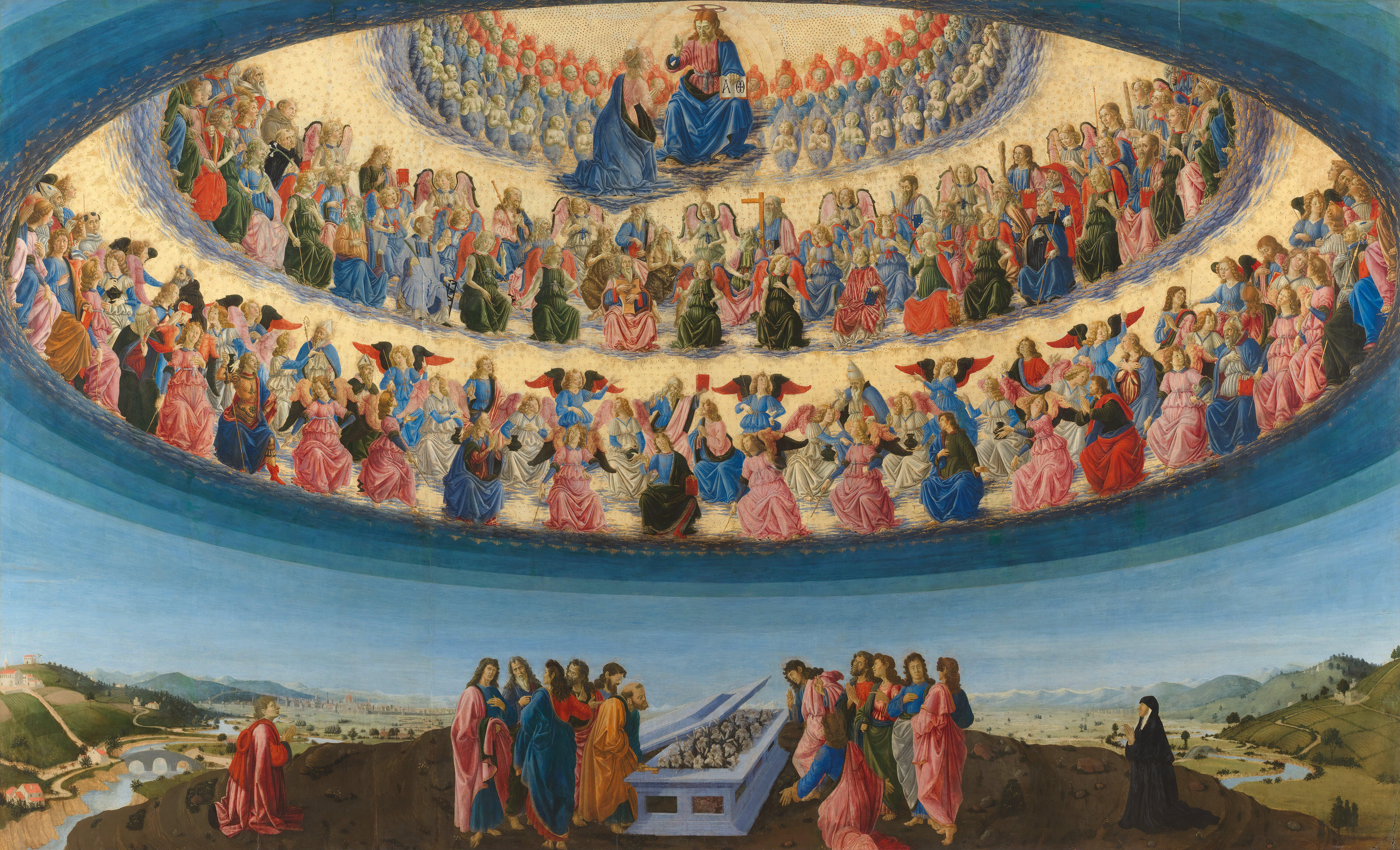
The Assumption of the Virgin by Francesco Botticini (1475–1476) at the National Gallery London, shows three hierarchies and nine orders of angels, each with different characteristics.

In Christianity, angels are the messengers of God, and take on varying roles throughout the Bible. They serve primarily as messengers but also as counsellors and guides throughout the Old and New Testaments.

== In the Bible ==
Psalms 91:11–12 attributes the guardianship of men to the angels.

In Matthew 18:10 Jesus warns not to despise children because "their angels in heaven always see the face of my Father in heaven." Luke 20:34–36 affirms that, like the angels, "those who are considered worthy of taking part in the age to come and in the resurrection from the dead will neither marry nor be given in marriage, and they can no longer die."

== General views ==
=== Antiquity ===
Belief in guardian angels can be traced throughout antiquity; for example, Menander and Plutarch (cf. Eusebius, "Praep. Evang.", xii) and Neo-Platonists, like Plotinus, held the view that guardian angels existed.

In chapter V of Ignatius of Antioch's Letter to the Trallians, the bishop gives a listing of angels not unlike that later proposed by Pseudo-Dionysius. In his First Epistle of Clement, Clement of Rome exhorts his listeners to join the angels in praising God. Clement of Alexandria wrote that angels "breathe" in men's thoughts and reasonings, and "puts in" their hearts "strength" and a keener perception. Evagrius Ponticus spoke of the concept of angelic companions and angels as models for behavior.

Augustine of Hippo remarks, the angels were experiencing something new as the creation of God unfolded. Augustine also considers that the 'good' angels seek at all times, to direct us towards the true source of happiness, God; that they encourage us in worship of God.

=== Pseudo-Dionysian hierarchy ===
According to Pseudo-Dionysius the Areopagite's De Coelesti Hierarchia (On the Celestial Hierarchy), there are three levels ("sphere") of angels, inside each of which there are three orders.

Various works of Christian theology have devised hierarchies of angelic beings. The most influential Christian angelic hierarchy was put forward around the turn of the 6th century CE by Pseudo-Dionysius in his work De Coelesti Hierarchia. He claimed to be an important figure who was converted by Paul the Apostle, and the Pseudo-Dionysius enjoyed greater influence than he would have if he had used his actual name, until Erasmus publicised doubts about the age of the work in the early 16th century.

=== Catholic Church ===
According to the Catechism of the Catholic Church (CCC) paragraph 328, "the existence of the spiritual, non-corporeal beings that Sacred Scripture usually calls 'angels' is a truth of faith. The witness of Scripture is as clear as the unanimity of Tradition." The same catechism states: "The whole life of the church benefits from the mysterious and powerful help of the angels [...] From its beginning until death, human life is surrounded by their watchful care and intercession." It also states, "Christ is the center of the angelic world. They are His angels [...] They belong to Him because they were created through and for Him".

=== The New Church (Swedenborgianism) ===
The New Church denominations that arose from the writings of theologian Emanuel Swedenborg have distinct ideas about angels and the spiritual world in which they dwell. Adherents believe that all angels are in human form with a spiritual body, and are not just minds without form. There are different orders of angels according to the three heavens, and each angel dwells in one of innumerable societies of angels. Such a society of angels can appear as one angel as a whole.

All angels originate from the human race, and there is not one angel in heaven who first did not live in a material body. Moreover, all children who die not only enter heaven but eventually become angels. The life of angels is that of usefulness, and their functions are so many that they cannot be enumerated. However each angel will enter a service according to the use that they had performed in their earthly life. Names of angels, such as Michael, Gabriel, and Raphael, signify a particular angelic function rather than an individual being.

While living in one's body an individual has conjunction with heaven through the angels, and with each person, there are at least two evil spirits and two angels. Temptation or pains of conscience originates from a conflict between evil spirits and angels. Due to man's sinful nature it is dangerous to have open direct communication with angels and they can only be seen when one's spiritual sight has been opened. Thus from moment to moment angels attempt to lead each person to what is good tacitly using the person's own thoughts.

=== Latter Day Saint movement ===
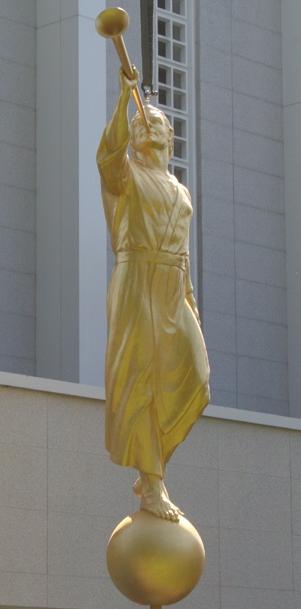
Temple statue of the Angel Moroni, Bern, Switzerland

The Latter Day Saint movement views angels as the messengers of God. They are sent to mankind to deliver messages, minister to humanity, teach doctrines of salvation, call mankind to repentance, give priesthood keys, save individuals in perilous times, and guide humankind.

Latter Day Saints believe that angels either are the spirits of humans who are deceased or who have yet to be born, or are humans who have been resurrected or translated and have physical bodies of flesh and bones. Joseph Smith taught that "there are no angels who minister to this earth but those that do belong or have belonged to it." As such, Latter Day Saints also believe that Adam, the first man, was and is now the archangel Michael, and that Gabriel lived on the earth as Noah. Likewise the Angel Moroni first lived in a pre-Columbian American civilization as the 5th-century prophet-warrior named Moroni.

Smith described his first angelic encounter in the following manner:

While I was thus in the act of calling upon God, I discovered a light appearing in my room, which continued to increase until the room was lighter than at noonday, when immediately a personage appeared at my bedside, standing in the air, for his feet did not touch the floor.

He had on a loose robe of most exquisite whiteness. It was a whiteness beyond anything earthly I had ever seen; nor do I believe that any earthly thing could be made to appear so exceedingly white and brilliant ...

Not only was his robe exceedingly white, but his whole person was glorious beyond description, and his countenance truly like lightning. The room was exceedingly light, but not so very bright as immediately around his person. When I first looked upon him, I was afraid; but the fear soon left me.

Most angelic visitations in the early Latter Day Saint movement were witnessed by Smith and Oliver Cowdery, who both said (prior to the establishment of the church in 1830) they had been visited by the prophet Moroni, John the Baptist, and the apostles Peter, James, and John. Later, after the dedication of the Kirtland Temple, Smith and Cowdery said they had been visited by Jesus, and subsequently by Moses, Elias, and Elijah.

Others who said they received a visit by an angel include the other two of the Three Witnesses: David Whitmer and Martin Harris. Many other Latter Day Saints, both in the early and modern church, have said they had seen angels, although Smith posited that, except in extenuating circumstances such as the restoration, mortals teach mortals, spirits teach spirits, and resurrected beings teach other resurrected beings.

== Catholic angel hierarchy ==
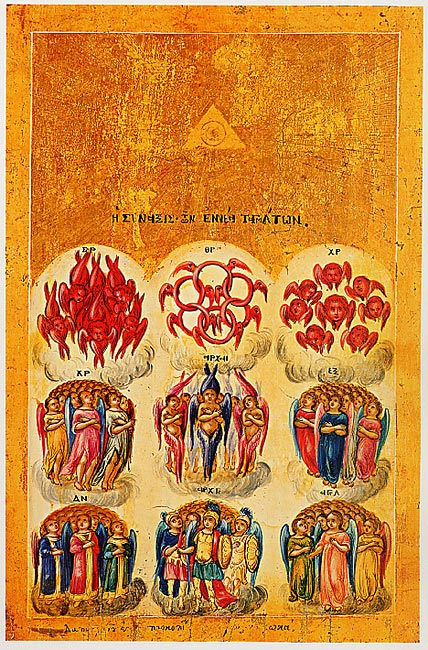
Eastern icon of nine orders of angels.

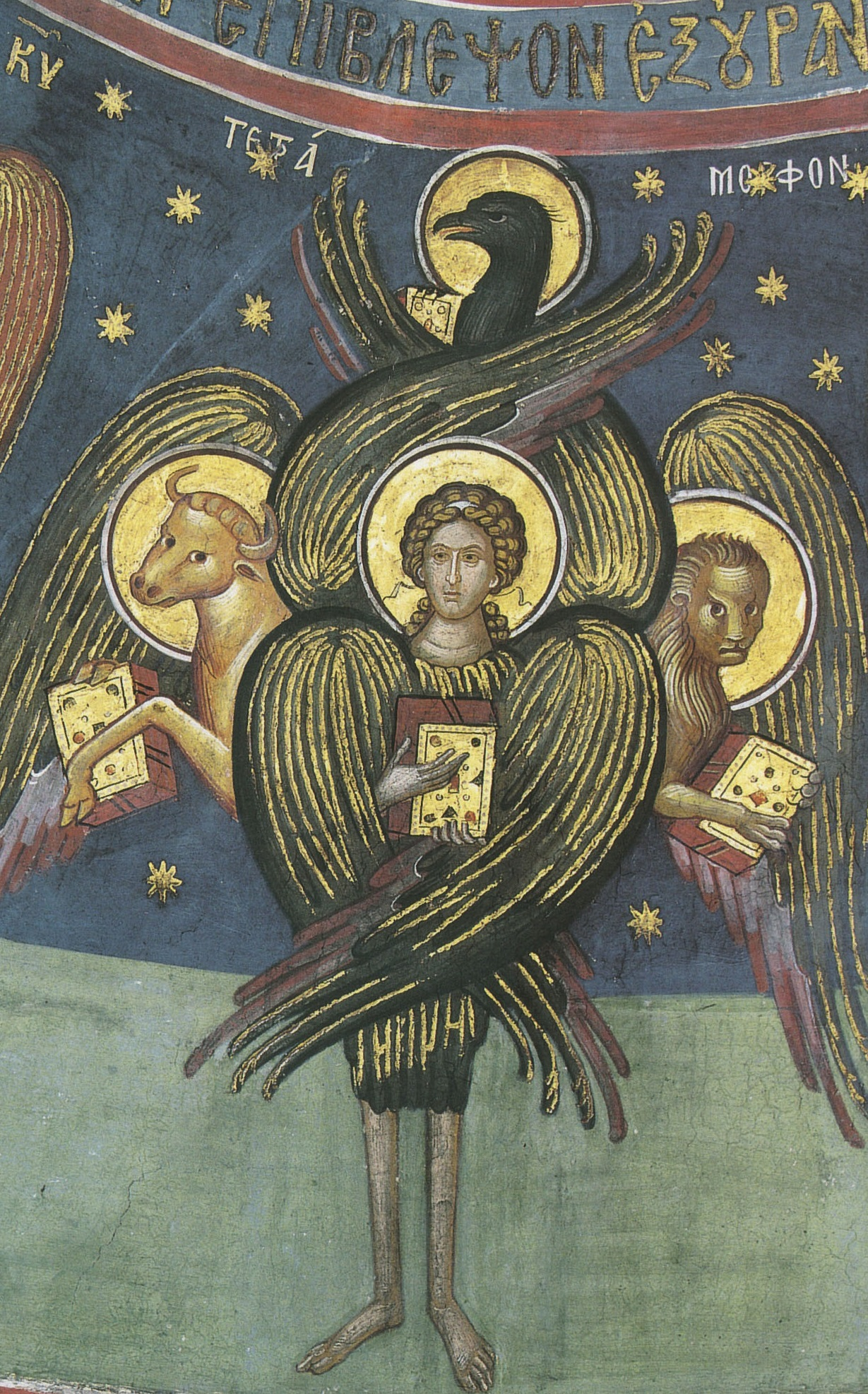
A cherub, as described by Ezekiel and according to traditional Christian iconography.

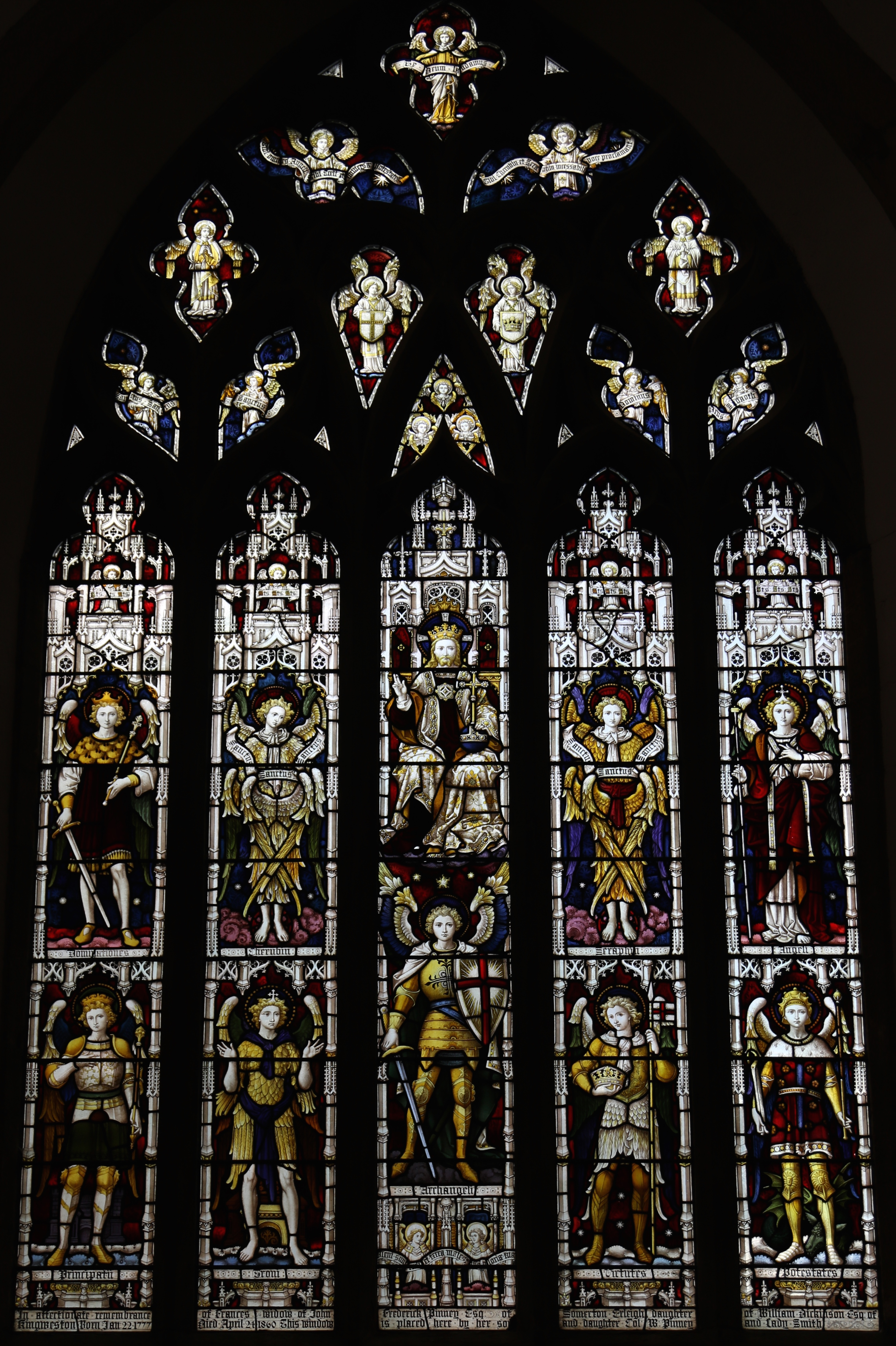
West window of the Church of St Michael and All Angels, Somerton. It depicts Christ the King in the centre with nine angelic figures, each of them represents, higher row: dominions, cherubim, seraphim, and angels; lower row: principalities, thrones, archangels, virtues, and powers.

=== First Order ===
==== Seraphim ====
Tradition places seraphim in a rank in Christian angelology, based on Isaiah's use of the word. Seraphim angels are the closest to God and lead worship in heaven by singing endless praises to him.

==== Cherubim ====
In the Book of Ezekiel, and in some Christian icons, the cherub is depicted as having two pairs of wings, and four faces: that of a lion (representative of all wild animals), an ox (domestic animals), a human (humanity), and an eagle (birds). Their legs were straight, the soles of their feet like the hooves of a bull, gleaming like polished brass. Later tradition ascribes to them a variety of physical appearances. In Western Christian tradition, cherubim have become associated with the putto (derived from classical Cupid/Eros), resulting in depictions of cherubim as small, plump, winged boys.

==== Thrones or ophanim ====
The ophanim refer to the wheels seen in Ezekiel's vision of the chariot (Hebrew merkabah) in Ezekiel 1:15–21. One of the Dead Sea scrolls (4Q405) construes them as angels.

=== Second Order ===
==== Dominions or lordships ====
The dominions (lat. dominatio, plural dominationes, also translated from the Greek term kyriotētes, pl. of kyriotēs, as "Lordships") are traditionally held to govern the movement of stars, planets, and other celestial objects.

==== Virtues ====
According to The Etymologies of Isidore of Seville, the Virtues or Authorities are known for their control of the elements. In addition to being the spirits of motion, they also assist in governing elements of nature, such as storms. They also assist with miracles, as well as encourage humans to strengthen their faith in God.

==== Powers ====
In The Etymologies of Isidore of Seville, the powers (lat. potestas (f), pl. potestates; Greek: ἐξουσίαι, exousiai) are given their name because they are angels who have power over evil forces, which the angels are able to restrain to keep them from doing harm. Powers also oversee the power which human beings—such as kings—have been given in the world.

=== Third Order ===
==== Principalities or rulers ====
According to The Etymologies of Isidore of Seville, the principalities (Latin: principatus), also translated as "Princedoms" and "Rulers", from the Greek archai, pl. of archē (see Greek root in Eph 3:10), are the angels that guide and protect nations, or groups of peoples, and institutions such as the Church. The principalities preside over the bands of angels and charge them with fulfilling the divine ministry. There are some who administer and some who assist.

An example of a principality angel with a specific cultus is the Angel of Portugal.

==== Archangels ====
The word archangel is used twice in the New Testament: in 1 Thessalonians 4:16 and Jude 1:9.

In most Christian traditions, Gabriel is also considered an archangel, but there is no direct literary support for this assumption. The term archangel appears only in the singular, never plural, and only in specific reference to Michael.

The name of the archangel Raphael appears only in the Book of Tobit (Tobias).

The Holy See's 2001 Directory on popular piety states: "The practice of assigning names to the Holy Angels should be discouraged, except in the cases of Gabriel, Raphael and Michael whose names are contained in Holy Scripture".

==== Guardian angels ====
A guardian angel is a type of angel that is assigned to protect and guide a particular person, group or nation. Belief in tutelary beings can be traced throughout all antiquity. The idea of angels that guard over people played a major role in Ancient Judaism. In Christianity, the hierarchy of angels was extensively developed in the 5th century by Pseudo-Dionysius the Areopagite. The theology of angels and tutelary spirits has undergone many changes since the 5th century. The belief is that guardian angels serve to protect whichever person God assigns them to. The watchers were of this class of angels.

== See also ==
- Angele Dei
- Angelic Hymn
- Angelic salutation
- Dynamics of the celestial spheres
- Fallen angel
- Heavenly host
- Hierarchy of angels
- List of angels in theology
- List of films about angels
