= El Adon =

El Adon or El Adon al kol ha-ma'asim (Hebrew: אל אדון or אל אדון על כל המעשים, English: God is the Lord or God is the Lord of all creation) is a well-known piyyut, recited on Shabbat morning during the yotzer ohr blessing. It was probably written in the Land of Israel during the Middle Ages but could be as old as the second century, making it possibly one of the oldest Jewish prayers in continuous use. Like many other liturgical poems, it is written without rhyme and as an alphabetical poem - meaning that the first line starts with the first letter of the Hebrew alphabet, the second line starts with the second letter thereof, and so on.

== Text ==
Text below is Nusach Sefard; Nusach Ashkenaz wording differs slightly, and there is a large variety of textual variant in old Ashkenazic siddurim. The first Hebrew letter of each line is made bold as to indicate the alphabetical nature of the poem.

Hebrew

אל אדון על כל המעשים
ברוך ומבורך בפי כל הנשמה
גדולו וטובו מלא עולם
דעת ותבונה סובבים הודו

המתגאה על חיות הקודש
ונהדר בכבוד על המרכבה
זכות ומשור לפני כסאו
חסד ורחמים מלא כבודו
טובים מאורות שבראם אלוהינו
יצרם בדעת בבינה ובהשכל
כח וגבורה נתן בהם
להיות מושלים בקרב תבל
מלאים זיו ומפיקים נוגה
נאה זיום בכל העולם
שֹמחים בצאתם וששים בבואם
עושים באימה רוצון קוניהם
פאר וכבוד נותנים לשמו
צהלה ורינה לזכר מלכותו
קרא לשמש ויזרח אור
ראה והיתקין צורת הלבנה
שבח נותנים לו כל צבא מרום
תפארת וגדולה שרפים, וחיות ואופני הקודש

Transliteration

El Adon 'al kol ha-ma'asim.
Barukh u'mevorakh be'fi kol ha-neshama
God'lo ve'tuvo male 'olam.
Da'at u'tvonah sovevim hodo

Ha-mitga'eh al Hayot ha-qodesh
Ve'nehdar be'khavod 'al ha-merkavah
Zekhut u'mishor lifne khis'o
Hesed ve'raHamim male kevodo
Tovim me'orot she'bram Elohenu
Yetzaram be'da'at, be'vina u'v'ha'skel
KoáH u'gvorah natan ba'hem
Lihyot moshelim be'kerev tevel
Mele'im ziv u'mfiqim nogah
Na'eh zivam be'khol ha-olam
SemeHim be'tzetam ve'sasim be'voam
'Osim be'emah rètzon qonehem
Pe'er ve'khavod notenim li'shmo
Tzahala ve'rina le'zekher malkhuto
Qara la'shemesh va'yizrah Ór.
Ra'ah ve'hitkin tzorat ha-levanah
ShevaH notenim lo kol tz'va marom
Tiferet u'gdulah serafim, ve'Hayot, ve'ofanei ha-qodesh.

English translation

God is the Lord of all creation
He is praised by the breath of all life
His greatness and goodness fills the universe
Knowledge and wisdom surround his presence

Exalted is He by the celestial beings
Adorned in the glory by the mysteries of heaven
Purity and justice guard his throne
Kindness and mercy abound in his glory
Good are the luminaries which our God created
Made with understanding, wisdom, and insight
He endowed them with energy and power
To dominate within their sphere of the universe
Full of splendour, they radiate brightness
Their brilliance adorns the universe
Rejoicing in rising and exalting in setting
With reverence they obey the will of their creator
Glory and honor they give to his name
And sing his sovereignty with joyous praise
He summoned the sun, and it shed its light
He set the cycle of the moon's phases
All the armies of heaven give him praise
His glory and grandeur they proclaim - all the various celestial beings
