= Angels in Judaism =

Supernatural beings that appear in Jewish texts

In Judaism, angels (Hebrew: מַלְאָךְ, romanized: mal’āḵ, lit. 'messenger', plural: מַלְאָכִים mal’āḵīm) are supernatural beings that appear throughout the Tanakh (Hebrew Bible), Rabbinic literature, Jewish apocrypha, Christian pseudepigrapha, Jewish philosophy, Jewish mysticism, and traditional Jewish liturgy as agents of the God of Israel. They are categorized in different hierarchies. Their essence is often associated with fire. The Talmud describes their very essence as fire.

== Etymology ==
Hebrew mal’ākh is the standard word for "messenger", both human and divine, in the Hebrew Bible; it is also related to the words for "angel" in Arabic (malāk ملاك), Aramaic and Ethiopic. It is rarely used for human messengers in Modern Hebrew, as the latter is usually denoted by the term shaliyakh (שליח). The noun derives from the verbal consonantal root l-’-k (ל-א-ך), meaning specifically "to send with a message" and with time was substituted with more applicable sh-l-h.

In Biblical Hebrew this root is attested only in this noun and in the noun מְלָאכָה məlʾāḵā́, meaning "work", "occupation" or "craftsmanship".

The morphological structure of the word mal’ākh suggests that it is the maqtal form of the root denoting the tool or the means of performing it. The term mal’ākh therefore simply means the one who is sent, often translated as "messenger" when applied to humans; for instance, mal’ākh is the root of the name of the prophet Malachi, whose name means "my messenger". In Modern Hebrew, mal’akh is the general word for "angel". In the same manner, apparently, the prophet Haggai is described as "the messenger of the Lord with the message of the Lord" (malʾakh ʾElohim be-malʾakhut ʾElohim; Book of Haggai 1:13).

== In the Tanakh (Hebrew Bible) ==
The Hebrew Bible reports that angels appeared to each of the Patriarchs, to Moses, Joshua, and numerous other figures. They appear to Hagar in Genesis 16:9, to Lot in Genesis 19:1, and to Abraham in Genesis 22:11, they ascend and descend Jacob's Ladder in Genesis 28:12 and appear to Jacob again in Genesis 31:11–13. God promises to send one to Moses in Exodus 33:2, and sends one to stand in the way of Balaam in Numbers 22:31.

Isaiah speaks of מַלְאַךְ פָּנָיו "the Angel of the Presence" ("In all their affliction He was afflicted, and the angel of His presence saved them: in His love and in His pity He redeemed them; and He bore them, and carried them all the days of old") (Isaiah 63:9).

The Book of Psalms says, "For He Will give His Angels Charge over you, to keep you in all your ways" (Psalms 91:11).

Different parts of the Bible deal with angels to different degrees. In numerous locations, the Bible introduces the idea of a Heavenly host or "host of heaven", and the related divine epithet "Lord of Hosts". While sometimes depicted militarily, the assembly also serves to praise God, in descriptions reminiscent of a kingly court. Genesis has Elohim, Bene Elohim (Sons of God), as does the Book of Job; Psalms has the related bənê ēlîm and bənê elîon, as well as Shinnan and Qedoshim.

The prophetic books, which usually do not write of angels, nonetheless mention Seraphim, Cherubim, and Ophanim, Chayot Ha Kodesh, Erelim, and Hashmallim. In the Book of Zechariah, several episodes explicitly contain Angels. In Daniel, angels gain some of the characteristics they would come to possess in the post-biblical Apocalyptic literature, such as each serving as personal patrons of peoples (Persia, Greece), and some having personal names (Gabriel, Michael).

== In rabbinic literature ==
As a subcategory of heavenly beings, mal’akim occupy the sixth rank of ten in Maimonides' Jewish angelic hierarchy.

=== Michael, Gabriel, Uriel, and Raphael ===
Numbers Rabbah names four angels who would later be known as archangels, surrounding God's throne:

As the Holy One blessed be He created four winds (directions) and four banners (for Israel's army), so also did He make four angels to surround His Throne—Michael, Gabriel, Uriel and Raphael. Michael is on its right, corresponding to the tribe of Reuben; Uriel on its left, corresponding to the tribe of Dan, which was located in the north; Gabriel in front, corresponding to the tribe of Judah as well as Moses and Aaron who were in the east; and Raphael in the rear, corresponding to the tribe of Ephraim which was in the west.

=== Affinities between angels and sages in the rabbinic literature ===
The Babylonian Talmud contains a reworked ancient tradition of the myth of the fallen angels – here, this narrative is invested with new significance and accordingly, these are the distinguished rabbis who are portrayed as the heavenly messengers' offspring. The most explicit presentation of this notion is found in Tractate Shabbat. The text recounts the sages' halakhic discussion in which Rabbi Hizkiya praises Rabbi Yohanan's competencies by exclaiming "this is not a human!". Right after his remark a following passage appears.

Rabbi Zeira said that Rava bar Zimuna said: If the early generations are characterized as sons of angels, we are the sons of men. And if the early generations are characterized as the sons of men, we are akin to donkeys. And I do not mean that we are akin to either the donkey of Rabbi Ḥanina ben Dosa or the donkey of Rabbi Pinḥas ben Yair, who were both extraordinarily intelligent donkeys; rather, we are akin to other typical donkeys.

Although on the façade this appears to be a humorous allegory, this passage represents a broader tradition of associating angels and rabbis that manifests in other passages dispersed in the Babylonian Talmud. This tendency has two components, and, on the one hand, the text compares the sages to angels in various respects such as knowledge (e.g., the sages should be good teachers playing the function of the angel of the Lord in Hagigah, some of their halakhic decisions are labeled as angelic in origins in Pesachim), or appearance (e.g., according to Shabbat Rabbi Yehudah bar Ilai's Sabbath attire resembles the garments of the angel of the Lord, in Kiddushin the Babylonian scholars are compared to the ministering angels). On the other hand, the Babylonian Talmud portrays the angels as highly reminiscent of the rabbis themselves: they are proficient halakhists (e.g., in Menachot an angel disputes the laws of fringes with Rabbi Kattina, in Avodah Zarah the angel of death betrays his deep familiarity with the rules of ritual slaughter), linguists (e.g., in Bava Batra Gabriel and Michael scrutinize the semantics of the term kadkod known from Isa. 54:12), and teachers (e.g., in Megillah and Sanhedrin an angelic prince admonishes Joshua for neglecting his Torah studies). On the whole, the quantitative data show that the sages are frequently juxtaposed with angels, and the main dimension of comparison is their intellectual proficiency. When it comes to the mapping of specific rabbinic competencies onto the angels, the most popular is the ability to engage in halakhic scrutiny and teaching. In sum, this presentation of the sages as angels can be taken as an expression of the sense of elitism entertained by the Babylonian sages.

== Angelic hierarchy ==
=== Rankings ===
Maimonides, in his Mishneh Torah, counted ten ranks of angels in the Jewish angelic hierarchy. The Zohar, in Exodus 43a, also lists ten ranks of angels. Jacob Nazir, in his Maseket Atzilut, also listed ten ranks of angels. Abraham ben Isaac of Granada, in his Berit Menuchah, also listed ten ranks of angels.

All of them are ranked with 1 being the highest, and all subsequent numbers being lower ranks.

Rank					Angelic Class	Notes	References
Zohar	Mishneh Torah	Maseket Atzilut	Berit Menuchah	Reshit Chochmah	Angelic Class	Notes	References
1	6	8	4	9	Malakhim/Malakim	Messengers, angels	
2	3	10	1	5	Erelim		See Isaiah 33:7
3	5	1	10	3	Seraphim		See Isaiah 6
4	1	N/A	N/A	1	Chayot Ha Kodesh/Chayot		See Ezekiel 1 and Ezekiel 10
5	2	2	9	2	Ophanim		See Ezekiel 1 and Ezekiel 10
6	4	7	5	7	Hashmallim		See Ezekiel 1:4
7	N/A	N/A	N/A	8	Elim	Gods who are not the Supreme God	
8	7	N/A	N/A	N/A	Elohim	"Godly beings", Powerful, supernatural beings distinct from other angels	
9	8	9	3	N/A	Bene Elohim	"Sons of God"	
10	10	6	2	10	Ishim	"manlike beings"	See Genesis 18:2 Daniel 10:5
N/A	9	3	8	4	Cherubim		See Hagigah 13b
N/A	N/A	4	7	N/A	Shinanim	"guardians of the 70 nations/70 angelic princes"	See Deuteronomy 32:8, Zohar 2:254a
N/A	N/A	5	6	6	Tarshishim	Their name is derived from Daniel 10:6, describing an angelic body like a Tarshish (beryl or chrysolite stone).	Zohar II, 43a (Exodus 43a)

=== In Kabbalah ===
The Kabbalah describes the angels at length. Angels are described in Kabbalah literature as forces that send information and sensations between mankind and the Tetragrammaton. They are analogized to atoms, wavelengths, or channels that help God in his creation, and it is therefore reasoned that they should not be worshipped, prayed to, nor invoked. They are not physical in nature but spiritual beings, like spiritual atoms. Therefore, the Kabbalah reasons, when they appear in the Hebrew Bible their description is from the viewpoint of the person that received the vision, prophesy, or occurrence, which will be anthropomorphic. However, they are not material beings but are likened to a single emotion, feeling, or material, controlled by God for his purpose of creation.

== In Jewish liturgy ==
Shalom Aleichem is a Jewish hymn, first documented in the 17th century, that is commonly sung on the eve of Shabbat, either upon returning home from services, or at the dinner-table.

שלום עליכם מלאכי השרת
Peace be unto you, Malakhei HaSharet (Angels of Service)
מלאכי עליון
Angels of the Most High
ממלך מלכי המלכים
From the King of the kings of kings
הקדוש ברוך הוא
The Holy One Blessed Be He

Before going to sleep, many Jews recite a traditional prayer naming four archangels, "To my right Michael and to my left Gabriel, in front of me Uriel and behind me Raphael, and over my head God's Shekhinah ['the presence of God']." The formula of this prayer appears on incantation bowls and amulets, and may have originally come from folk magic practices. Michael and Gabriel appear in these incantations on the right and left (though sometimes their positions are swapped), but the name's of the angels in front and behind the speaker or subject vary.

On the Jewish holiday of Simchat Torah, it is customary to call all the boys (in some synagogues, all the children) to the Torah reading and for the whole congregation to recite a verse from Jacob's blessing to Ephraim and Manasheh (Manassas).

May the angel who redeems me from all evil, bless the children, and let my name be named in them, and the name of my fathers Abraham and Isaac, and let them flourish like fish for multitude in the midst of the land.

— Genesis 48:16

== In popular belief ==
In the ancient Near East, Jews understood the sun, moon, and stars to be angels, just as others in the same region viewed them as divine beings. Philo of Alexandria identified angels in Judaism to be the same being as daemons in Hellenistic thought. In Late Antiquity, the two most popularly invoked angels among Jews were Michael and Gabriel. Some Jews seem to have understood pagan deities or figures, such as Abraxas, Helios, and Hermes, to actually be angels. Figures who "entered heaven alive", such as Elijah, are sometimes interpreted by Jews as having been transformed into angels (historically and currently).

In the ancient world, there were many different understandings of angels among Jews, some of which are quite different to modern ideas. For example, some magical texts demonstrate that practitioners believed they could control angels. In the modern day, angels are usually understood in Judaism as being controlled solely by God, to the point of not really being understood as having personalities. However, even in those times, a few common elements emerge. One is the body of angels, who were understood to be made of light, likely following their description in Daniel: "a body like beryl [or topaz, in any case of yellow color] and a face with the appearance of lightening and eyes like torches of fire and arms and legs like gleaming bronze" (Dan 10:6). Some stories say angels are made from a fiery river. Others say they are created with every word God speaks. Some say angels are all long lived/immortal, and others say there are angels who are born and die the same day. While there is a significant amount of Jewish literature concerned with heaven and angels, historically there has not been a systematized angelology that a majority or plurality of Jews believe in.

The Qumran community believed that humans should try to act like angels, particularly by practicing circumcision and observing Shabbat. The author of Jubilees, one of the texts found in the Qumran library, believed that angels were created already circumcised. Other texts indicate that some Jews in the first century (before the destruction of the Jerusalem Temple) believed angels were present in the congregation during prayer. This view became increasingly common in late Antiquity, and was influential for early Christians. One of the prayers developed in late Antiquity (and still used today) is the Qedushah, a prayer which quotes the angels in a prophetic vision. Jews during Yom Kippur services are especially likened to angels, even today, by wearing white (alternatively, this is also associated with the dead), fasting (angels do not need to eat or drink), standing straight up (a posture attributed to angels), setting aside differences and co-existing, and devoting the whole day to prayer.

Yannai, a Jewish Late Antique poet, composed several liturgical poems building on this idea. His works, being a kind of popular literature, indicate that for many Jews, seeing themselves as angel-like in prayer was important. He thought of and taught ways for people to be angel-like through his poetry, while also being a supporter of the relatively young Rabbinic movement. He agreed with Rabbinic opinion on angels (though only the most contemporary strata, which by his time was more accepting of angels) while engaging with the religious imagination of lay people. The genre of poetry Yannai created is called "qedushta", owing to its emphasis on using the central phrase of the Qedushah. In qedushta, the Qedushah is treated as the climax of prayer, and generally emphasized as something said by both angels and the current congregation (a small number of Yannai's qedushta'ot refer to only angels reciting, and another small number mention angels and biblical figures but not the congregation). Some of these prayers emphasize the presence of Levites, elders, and women among the congregation, perhaps implying they are especially angel-like. The development of the qedushta seems to have been driven by popular desire, not by rabbis. Unfortunately, rabbinic literature makes no direct comment on the qedushta or the development of liturgy in synagogues overall.

While Yannai's work heavily focuses on identification with angels, he does not have any invocations toward angels (as seen in historic folk practice and a handful of currently used Jewish prayers). Instead, humans and angels are always subordinates praying together to God. However, Yannai was clearly aware of ritual practices where such prayers were said. In one of his poems, he lists the many things which can be accomplished with God's name, such as healing and driving out demons (in many ritual incantations, both God and angels are invoked as powerful beings that can heal and protect). In doing so, he acknowledges ritual practices using God's name and affirms them as valid, placing them alongside Moses' parting of the Red Sea.

Beyond the imitation of angels in prayer, some Rabbis believed that humans were created in the image of angels, such as Rabbi Pappais (Rabbi Akiva's opinion that humans were made in the image of God and God alone has enjoyed greater official popularity). Some of Yannai's poems also record his belief that human beings were made in the likeness of angels, though they also reference the rabbinic midrashim about angels being jealous of humans.

Some Late Antique Jewish incantation bowls (found around the region of modern Iraq) would mention angels and call on their aid, but would not mention God. Currently, it is thought that people who made incantation bowls thought it was inappropriate to invoke God for certain things (like business deals) but that angels would be available for help with such issues. Other incantations do mention God and stress the angels' subordinate status to God. Angels on these bowls were invoked to help with cantankerous in-laws, business, countering curses, protection from supernatural forces (such as demons or Zoroastrian devas), healing, desire for children, and increased affection in one's marriage. The imagery of how the angels act in these incantations includes loving and gentle behavior.

Some incantation bowls also invoke humans of the past, such as Adam, Noah, Abraham, Isaac, Jacob, Moses, David, Solomon, Rabbi Joshua ben Perahia, and Rabbi Hanina ben Dosa. The former group, being biblical figures, were often the subject of myths and folktales that made them even more heroic than their scriptural depiction. Solomon notably, was well known for his magical power, and Rabbi Perahia was said to have created a "writ of divorce" ritual for dealing with demons. Rabbi Dosa was the subject of a folktale where he recited part of Psalm 104 ("You make the darkness and it is night, wherein all animals of the forest creep") to control a malicious spirit by reminding it of God's authority.

Angels are noted as speaking to women in the Torah, commentaries of the Torah, and on the incantation bowls. In the case of the former two, this historically was often done to downgrade women's status by claiming God never speaks to women (it is notable that a variety of Jewish literature talks about men talking to angels, but also God and prophets such as Elijah). In the incantation bowls, women portrayed their relationship to angels in positive and intimate terms.

Late Antique angelic invocations were not unique to the Babylonian region, however. In the Levant, not only were amulets invoking angels common, but it is thought by some scholars that the Sefer Ha Razim was composed in Palestine (others say Egypt). Both forms of text provide evidence of how a large segment of the Jewish population viewed angels. In Palestinian amulets, a particularity of the region is that angels are given specific spheres of influence, such as parts of the landscape (roads, rivers, seas, clouds, Sheol, the moon), ailments, or body parts. This focus may have been a Greco-Roman influence. There is also evidence that ritual practitioners traveled from region to region, bringing ideas and customs with them that were adopted by Jews in different areas. Jews also developed a belief that each nation had an angel presiding over it, and that angels of different nations sometimes battled each other. Rabbinic interpretations sometimes alluded to this belief as well.

The angelic names used in different regions during Late Antiquity vary slightly, including both well known figures and regionalized names. The reasons for invoking angels also vary. In Palestine, angels were most commonly invoked for specific health issues.

From the Sefer Ha Razim it has been analyzed that angels had a few more common characteristics for many Jews in Antiquity. It was believed that timing was very important in angelic rituals, as certain years, seasons, and times of day were better for invoking certain angels. There are overseers in heaven (the Sefer Ha Razim counts 7) who angels are under the supervision of, and who angels must be given permission from in order to leave the heavens. Angelic abilities are also outlined. Angels are understood to know the movements of the celestial bodies, have free movement through the seven heavenly realms, have proficiency in the hierarchies of the angels and their overseers, know how to correctly interpret dreams, have power over spirits and demons (ruhot and pegaim), comprehend natural phenomena (storms, lightning), know the future and know the heavenly liturgy.

In the preamble of the Sefer Ha Razim (likely composed separately from the spells, then combined with them later) it specifically remarks on command of demons and spirits, but not of angels. However, some of the spells do seek to command angels, adjuring and commanding them (especially in erotic binding spells). Some of the other spells are "in the name of the angels" or make requests of them. Each approach to angelic invocation likely reflects two different contemporary views of angels among Jews: those who thought angels should be respected as divine messengers, and those who pragmatically viewed angels as powerful beings to help achieve goals.

Other magical instruction manuals with angelic invocations circulated at the time, and even beyond into the medieval period (just as the Sefer Ha Razim did). Fragments of these texts have been found in the Cairo Genziah, as have artifacts (in various places) corresponding to the instructions in those texts.

Gendered tensions exist in these texts of Jewish angelic magic. On one hand, while angels were often invoked on behalf of women and women did rituals using angelic magic, the instructional texts were written by men. Because of this, the practitioner is often cautioned of the "impurity of women" which may impact his own ritual impurity (contrasting other contemporary attitudes where angels did not care if a woman was pure or impure). This eventually led to later Jewish magical traditions excluding women entirely. On the other hand, even though men and women both took part in magic, women are stereotyped as the ones most likely to do it and put under suspicion. Practices associated with women in a negative context (such burning incense for magic rituals) are even described in the texts produced by men, without mention of male practitioners as also doing them in these condemnations.

Many rabbis, particularly in their earlier history, have tried to downplay the role of angels in Judaism. While angelic invocations and other ritual practices were popular among Jews for centuries, early rabbis often stood out in the community for their discomfort with these practices. This discomfort is often caused by the popularity and power of beliefs and practices around angels in folk Judaism. Prior to the rise of rabbis as an institution, belief in angels was very popular in Judaism, and angels were beginning to be seen as an intermediary between humans and the divine. This was an attitude some rabbis found offensive (or in some cases outright heretical). It also threatened the rabbis own position as intermediaries. While this has led to lasting impacts on Judaism (such as some Passover Haggadah overwriting the text of the Torah to claim angels did not help lead the Hebrews and Erev Rav out of Egypt), ultimately these attempts failed, as angels remained popular among Jews for centuries.

Angels in the Mishnah are mentioned only subtextually, and often in the context of condemnation. For example, at one point the Mishnah says a sacrifice in the name of mountains, hills, seas, rivers, or wilderness is invalid. While angels are not directly mentioned, it is evident from contemporary literature that angels were sometimes associated with all these things. A parallel condemnation is found in the Tosefta, where it is explicitly mentioned that sacrifices to the angel Michael are invalid. Rituals invoking angels for amulets may have involved sacrifice. Jewish laity may have seen this as acceptable because in Judges 6, Gideon offers a sacrifice to an angel as a test to prove it's divine status, which is accepted by the angel making the sacrifice be consumed by sudden magical fire.

On another occasion, the Palestinian Talmud instructs people not to pray to angels, but to God (possibly out of worry people would stop praying to the latter at all). The Mishnah, however, says that a prayer praising God and angels is acceptable. Both of these indicate that praying to angels alone and to angels and God were both common practices when these texts were written. The Palestinian Talmud also mentions other popular beliefs about angels, which are not always condemned, such as the belief that one intercessing angel is more powerful than a thousand accusatory angels in the court of God.

Another practice extant archeologically and condemned rabbinically is the making of an image of anything in the heavens. This prohibition included the sun, stars, and moon, but also angels. However, in ancient synagogues we find elaborate mosaics, including mosaics depicting Helios as an angel. This indicates that lay Jews understood the supporting scripture differently (which would not have been difficult to do).

The view of angels, even among early rabbis, was not a monolith. There were two broad attitudes toward angels: the allegorizing school, who viewed any anthropomorphic mention of God as actually being an angel acting on God's behalf (as a subordinate) and took their presence as a given; and the literalizing school which had no issue with God being described in anthropomorphic terms and saw angels as undermining the rhetoric of God's devotion to Jews and Israel. The allegorical school emphasized the transcendence of God, and sometimes added in or erased angels from its discussion of scripture.

Over time, rabbis eventually came to embrace angels and even use them to their own ends. Angels were added into old stories where they had been absent, and there was an increased focus on ideas such as guardian angels. It is both historically and currently believed that good people have guardian angels. In the past, it was also believed that each person has a good angel and a bad angel assigned to them, or that good people have good angels and bad people have "angels of satan" ("satan" here used generically to refer to an ill intentioned person). These beliefs were also recorded in Rabbinic literature. There are also "evil angels" that generally punish misdeeds of a people. Angels historically were not understood to be "good" as an entire group, and "evil angels" were never equated to demons. There is no known evidence of God using demons (mazikin) as messengers or servants in scripture or ritual texts. These beliefs lead to the development of prayers to angels (such as those said before going to the bathroom), though people were cautioned not to pray in Aramaic. It is believed that angels do not understand Aramaic, though this was likely a practical measure to encourage prayer in Hebrew.

There are multiple, slightly different beliefs about if angels have their own will, thoughts, and emotions. Some Jews think of angels as something like divine automatons. Some think that while angels cannot act directly against divine will, they may protest or have emotional reactions towards commands given by God. They especially may feel fondly for the mortals they are in charge of, and seek to protect them. There are also apocryphal writing where angels are depicted as able to disobey God, such as the Watchers, and more mainstream (but still not well known) stories of angels fulfilling orders, but doing so in a way that purposely circumvents the reason the order was given (such as Gabriel not completely burning Jerusalem). Angels in Rabbinic Judaism are usually understood as immune to sin or as lacking yetzer hara (evil inclination, something akin to a part of the soul in some traditions).

Angels names often indicate what they have power over and when it is appropriate to invoke them. Raphael is one of the most well known, with a name that has connotations of healing. Another common example is 'Anael, who Late Antique Jews invoked as someone who listens to prayers and answers them (the verb '-n-h means "to answer" in Aramaic). 'Anael was also understood as being partial to women and especially responsive to them. Localized angels may have names like Nahariel ("nahar" for river) as well as more abstract concepts like Sadqiel ("justice").

== See also ==
- List of angels in theology
- List of angels in Sefer HaRazim
- Angels in Islam
- Sukkal
- Uthra (in Mandaeism)
