= De Coelesti Hierarchia =

5th-century work on angelology

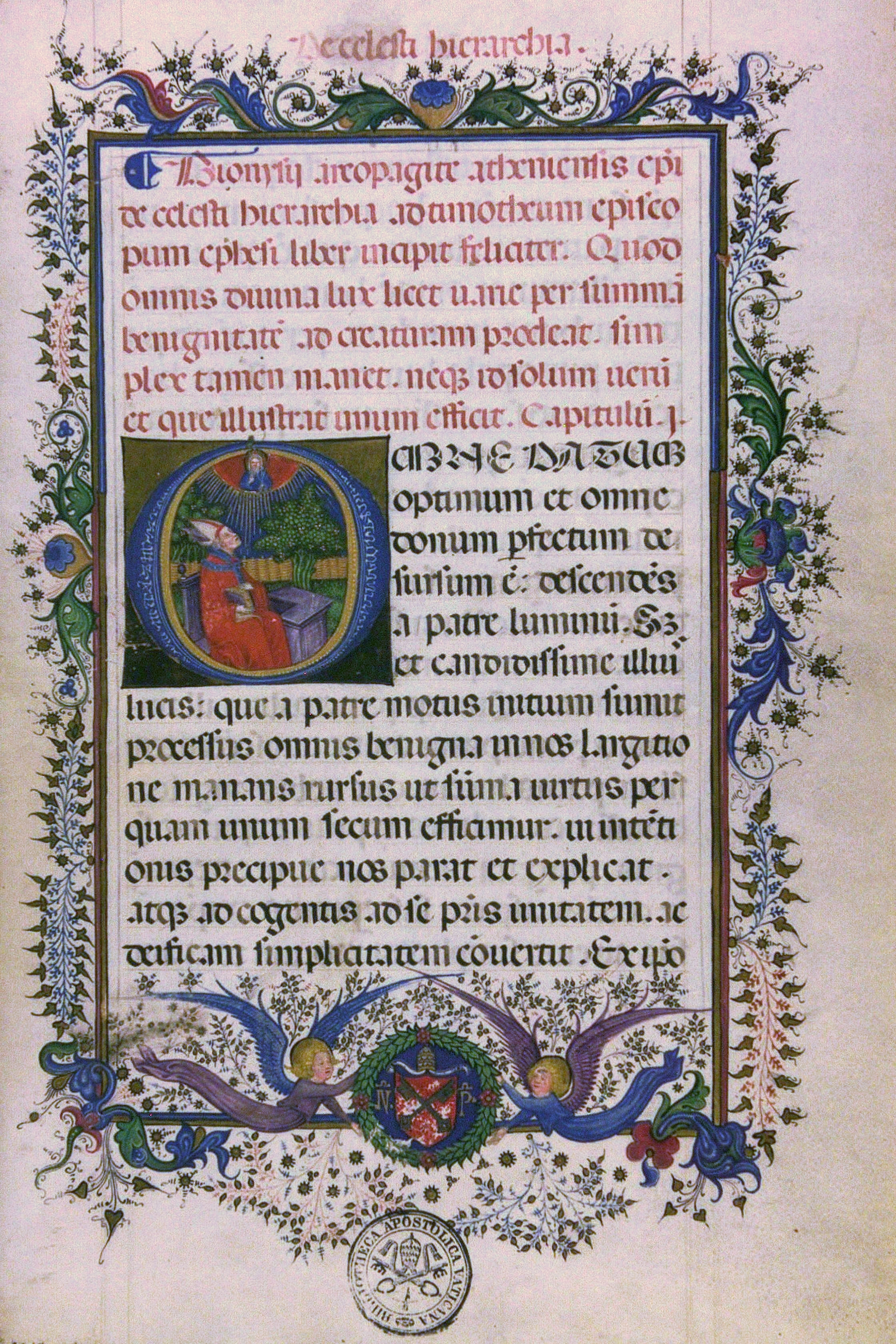
Latin translation, 15th century

De Coelesti Hierarchia (Ancient Greek: Περὶ τῆς Οὐρανίας Ἱεραρχίας, romanized: Peri tēs Ouraníās Hierarchíās, "On the Celestial Hierarchy") is a Pseudo-Dionysian work on angelology, written in Greek and dated to ca. AD the 5th century; it exerted great influence on scholasticism and treats at great length the hierarchies of angels.

== Editions ==
- Pseudo-Dionysius Areopagita, De Coelesti Hierarchia, Surrey, 1935. Shrine of Wisdom ISBN 978-0-90066-403-8.
- G. Heil, A. M. Ritter, Pseudo-Dionysius Areopagita. De Coelesti Hierarchia, De Ecclesiastica Hierarchia, De Mystica Theologia, Epistulae (1991) ISBN 978-3-11-012041-7.

== See also ==
- Orthodox St. Dionysus Institute in Paris
- Christian angelic hierarchy
- Gregory Palamas
- Apophatic theology
- Hesychasm
- Seven archangels
- Vladimir Lossky
