= Ubadah ibn al-Samit =

Ansar tribal chieftain and Muhammad's Companion

'Ubadah ibn al-Samit Al Khazraji: "Al-Aqabi"; "Al-Ansari"; "Al-Badri"; "Al-Uhudi"

Qadi of Homs and Jerusalem; Mufti of Rashidun Caliphate
- Governor: Mu'awiya I

Personal details
- Born: c. 583 (38 B.H) Yathrib, Hijaz, Arabia
- Died: c. 655 (aged 72) Palestine
- Resting place: Bab al-Rahma, Jerusalem
- Spouses: Umm Haram; Jamilah bint Abi Sa'sa
- Children: 2
- Known for: Companion of Muhammad

Military service
- Allegiance: Muhammad (623–632); Rashidun Caliphate (632–655)
- Branch/service: Rashidun army
- Years of service: 623–655
- Battles/wars: Under Muhammad: Battle of Badr; Battle of Uhud; Battle of Khandaq; Expedition of al-Muraysi'; Battle of Khaybar; Battle of Hunayn; Expedition of Tabuk; Under Rashidun caliphs: Ridda Wars (unspecified battles); Siege of Emesa; Battle of Tartus; Siege of Latakia; Battle of Ajnadayn; Siege of Damascus; Battle of Yarmouk; Siege of Jerusalem; Siege of Babylon Fortress; Siege of Alexandria; Raids of Amorium; Muslim conquest of Cyprus

'Ubadah ibn al-Samit (Arabic: عُبَادَة بۡن ٱلصَّامِت ʿUbādah ibn aṣ-Ṣāmit) was a companion of Muhammad and a well-respected chieftain of the Ansar. He participated in almost every battle during Muhammad's era. His official title, according to Muslim scholarly tradition, was 'Ubadah ibn Saamit al-Ansari al-Badri (عُبَادَة بۡن ٱلصَّامِت ٱلۡأَنْصَارِيّ ٱلۡبَدْرِيّ) for his actions at the Battle of Badr. He served under the first three Rashidun caliphs in the Muslim campaigns against the Byzantine Empire.

The conquest of Cyprus marked 'Ubadah as one of the Rashidun army's most successful military commanders. He participated in more than seven large scale military campaigns before ending his career as a qadi in the Holy Land. In later years he assisted Mu'awiya ibn Abi Sufyan, the governor of Syria and future founder of the Umayyad Caliphate.

'Ubadah served as the Quranic teacher of the Suffah, as well as the mufti and judge of the Rashidun Caliphate, and was involved in the matters of converting subdued populations and building mosques, such as the Amr ibn al-As Mosque in Egypt and the Congregational mosque in Homs. Despite his low structural position, 'Ubadah's influence as a respected senior sahaba who was trusted by Muhammad and Caliph Umar could over-rule many of his compatriots, including those who outranked him structurally such as Mu'awiya, who served as Governor of Homs during 'Ubadah's tenure as judge.

Islamic scholars regard 'Ubadah as an influential companion of Muhammad who passed down many hadiths that became the basis of fiqh ruling in various matters.

== Early life ==
'Ubadah was a descendant of Yemeni Arabs who settled in Yathrib and formed the Banu Aws and Khazraj tribes. He was born into the latter and became a prominent chief. His genealogical lineage was 'Ubadah ibn al-Samit Ibn Qais bin Asram bin Fahr bin Tha'labah ibn Ghanm ibn Auf ibn (Amr bin Auf) ibn Al Khazraj. Sometime before Muhammad's migration from Mecca, 'Ubadah and other Banu Aws and Khazraj tribe chieftains, such as Abd Allah ibn Rawahah, ʿAbdullah ibn Haram, Sa'd ibn 'Ubadah, and Abu Talha al-Ansari, met Muhammad at Aqabah during their journey from Medina to perform Hajj in Mecca. In historical literature, these clan leaders are said to have done Hajj to achieve enlightenment after they grew weary of tribal conflicts, particularly the civil war of Yathrib that Muslim historians call the Battle of Bu'ath. They listened to Muhammad's preaching and considered him to be the solution to unite their tribes. They immediately pledged their allegiance to him, marking this event as the first pledge of al-Aqabah. 'Ubadah was around forty years old. Later he participated in the Second pledge at al-Aqabah, and narrated the event.

I was among those who were present at Aqabah. We were twelve men who took an oath of allegiance to the Messenger of Allah Sallallahu Alayhi Wasallam in the Pledge of Aqabah, which was called Bai'at An-Nisa' (Note: It was called Baiat an Nisa, or Pledge of the Women, because of the presence of 'Afra bint 'Ubaid ibn Tha'labah, who was the first women to swear an oath of allegiance) This was before the fighting was enjoined, so we pledged not to associate anything with Allah, not to steal, not to commit adultery, not to kill our children, not to intentionally forge falsehood, (Note: Referencing Al-Mumtahanah verse 12) and not to disobey him in any just matter. "If you fulfil that then Paradise will be yours, but if you commit any of these sins, it is for Allah to forgive or punish as He wills' "

When the Meccan Muslims were migrating to seek refuge in Yathrib (now Medina), 'Ubadah and his fellow Banu Aws and Khazraji provided shelter to them as Muhammad immediately instructed 'Ubadah to take an oath of brotherhood with the Muhajirun named Abu Marthad al-Ghanwi.

=== Battles under Muhammad ===
During Muhammad's stay in Yathrib, 'Ubadah participated at the Battle of Badr, which elevated his status as a patron of Islam in the view of Muslim scholars and earned him the title of al-Badri, which is bestowed to Muslims who attended the battle. 'Ubadah gave his testimony in regards to the aftermath of the battle when the Muslim army discussed their prisoners of war.

'Ubadah also participated in the Battle of Uhud.

After the incident between the Banu Qaynuqa tribe and Muhammad, 'Ubadah announced that he had annulled the alliance with the Banu Qaynuqa, and it was this incident that led to the revelation of Surah Al-Ma'idah 5:51 and Surah Al-Ma'idah 5:52 from God to Muhammad. 'Ubadah's position as a respected head of the clan superseded Abd Allah ibn Ubayy's (another Khazraji chief) support of the Jews. In the end, the entire clan instead followed 'Ubadah and supported Muhammad and they expelled the Banu Qaynuqa Jews from Medina and took their date palm gardens as a holy war benefit for the city's Muslim community before continuing to serve in the Battle of Khandaq. In January 627, the Ansaris under 'Ubadah and his colleague, Sa'd ibn 'Ubadah, led an expedition against the Banu Mustaliq tribe. The raid was successful and they took 200 families captive, along with 200 camels, 5,000 sheep, goats, and a large quantity of household goods. However, during the battle 'Ubadah unintentionally killed one of his Ansari clansmen, Hisham ibn Subabah. Sometime after the Treaty of Hudaybiyya, 'Ubadah fought in the Battle of Khaybar.

'Ubadah participated in virtually all military expeditions personally led by Muhammad before his death.

== Rashidun Caliphate ==
After the selection of the first caliph, rebellion broke out across the caliphate. 'Ubadah was commanded by Caliph Abu Bakr to quell the rebellions across Arabia, though it is not recorded which battles he was involved in. According to David Nicolle, the four Rashidun contingents left Medina between the autumn of 633 to 634 before Khalid converged with other contingents led by generals such as Abu Ubayda ibn al-Jarrah, Yazid ibn Abi Sufyan, Amr ibn al-As and Shurahbil ibn Hasana. 'Ubadah, Abu al-Darda, and Muadh ibn Jabal were sent to Syria after the caliph was asked to send preachers to teach the newly subdued Syrian Christians. At some point, 'Ubadah was tasked to assist the military campaigns in Syria.

During the time of Caliph Umar ibn al-Khattab, reinforcement requests came from the Syrian front during the Rashidun's conquest of Levant. Umar sent 'Ubadah to join forces with Abu Ubayda and Khalid ibn al-Walid. 'Ubadah participated in the Battle of Ajnadayn under Khalid ibn al-Walid, where the 100,000 Byzantine soldiers under General Vardan were trapped and defeated, and then fled to Damascus. This battle ended with more than half of the Byzantine army killed, including Vardan.

During the Siege of Emesa between 635 and 636 AD, Abu Ubaydah appointed 'Ubadah as his deputy in Homs while Abu Ubaydah left to capture Hamah. 'Ubadah stayed there with his wife, Umm Haram, where Umm Haram remembered the hadith that allegedly prophesied the future conquest of Cyprus in which she and her husband participated.

Oh Jabla. Don't you know how we faced your advanced forces at Ajnadain and other places and how Allah Subhanahu Wa ta 'Ala granted us victory over you and how your tyrant ran away? We know who remains from your forces and they are easy for us. We are not afraid of these forces that have come. We have tasted blood and we haven't found blood sweeter than the blood of the Romans! Jabla, I call you to the religion of Islam and to enter our religion with your people and keep your honor in this life and the next life. do not be a servant of these uncouth Romans and put your life on the line to save them from destruction. You are from the chiefs of the Arabs and a king. Verily our religion has appeared. Follow the path of those who have repented and returned to Allah and believe in Him and say: "There is no God but Allah and Mohamed is the Messenger of Allah…"
'Ubadah ibn al-Samit taunt to Jabalah ibn al-Aiham before the Battle of Yarmuk

'Ubadah participated in the Battle of Yarmouk.

After they defeated the Byzantine coalitions in Yarmouk, 'Ubadah, along with the army of Abu Ubaydah and Khalid, continued their conquest until they reached northern Syria, where they turned south to pacify coastal Levant. 'Ubadah was instructed to lead a detachment to subdue Tartus, a coastal fortress city. While 'Ubadah occupied Tartus in 636, Mu'awiya came to the city, and built an amsar complex, while also delegating fiefs to the garrison commanders.

'Ubadah was commanded by Abu Ubaydah to march towards Jablah and Laodicea (Latakia). 'Ubadah met with resistance from the local garrison during the siege of Latakia. He observed that the city had a massive gate that could only be opened by a large number of men. He ordered his men to camp and dig trenches that could hide a rider on horseback. 'Ubadah and his army pretended to return to Homs, while at night he ordered the army to return to hide themselves in the trench. When the people in Laodicea thought 'Ubadah had left, they opened the gate to let their cattle out. 'Ubadah then ordered his entire army to attack. The Byzantines were caught by surprise and failed to close the gate. He climbed the wall then gave the signal of takbir terrifying the Byzantines and causing them to flee towards Al-Yusaiyid. The fleeing Byzantine soldiers and local citizens returned and surrendered to 'Ubadah, who accepted their surrender and allowed them to return to their homes with specific conditions, including the obligation to pay the kharaj land tax. While 'Ubadah oversaw Latakia, no buildings were razed including churches, while starting to build mosques. He stayed to establish the order of the caliphate on the subdued population. One particular mosque, Jami' al Bazaar or Mosque al-Bazaar survives. Laodicea was renamed to Latakia or Al-Ladhiqiyah.

After settling matters in Latakia, 'Ubadah marched into other Byzantine controlled cities, and subdued them one by one from Salamiyah to the port city of Baniyas.

Circa 630s, 'Ubadah subdued the city of Paltus, which would become an Arab settlement called Arab al-Mulk during a later era, as recorded by Yaqut al-Hamawi.

=== Transfer to Egypt ===
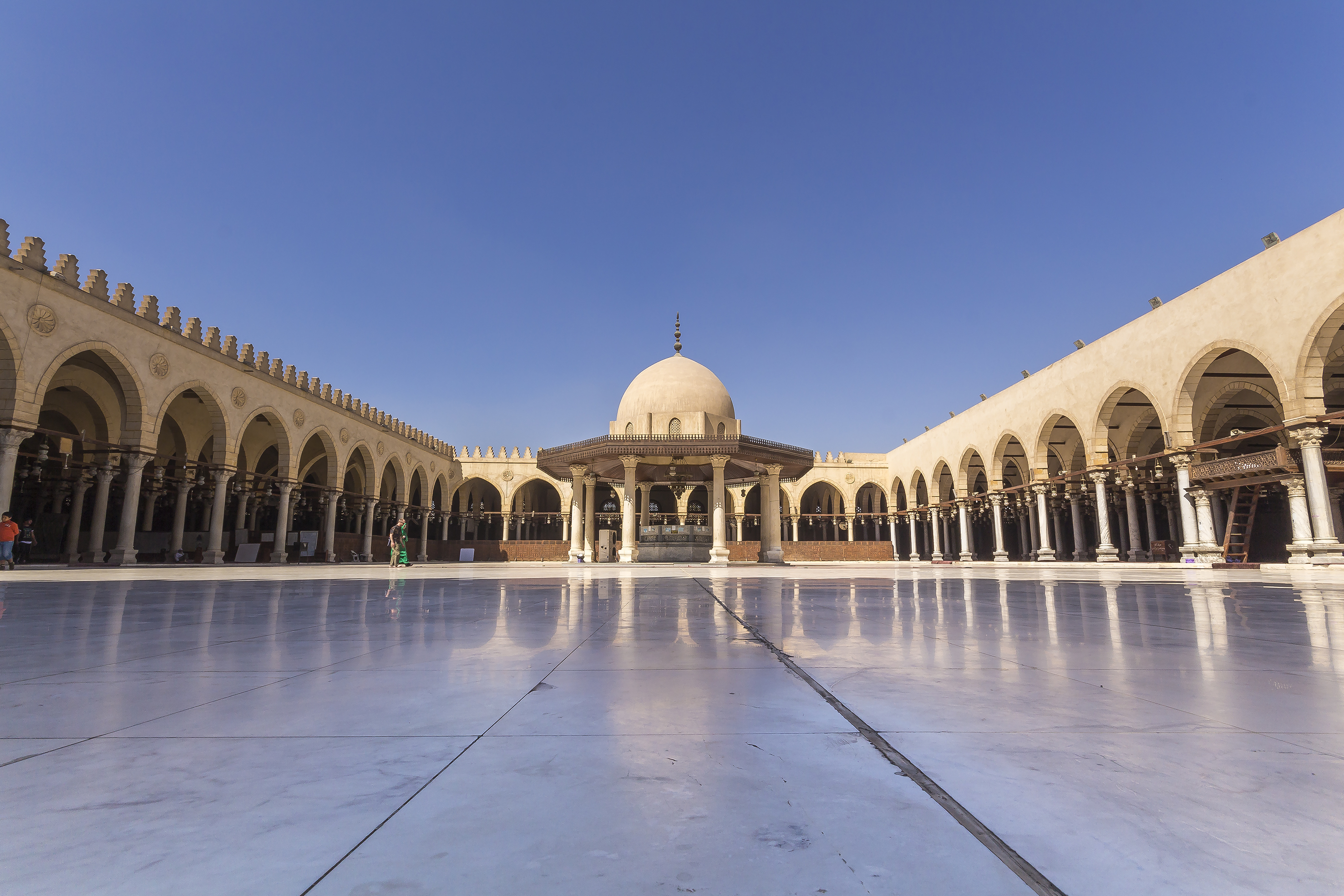
The courtyard of the Mosque of Amr ibn al-As in 2013. A mosque that was built by Amr ibn al-As with the assistance of Ubadah.

In July 640, during the siege of Babylon fortress in Egypt against the Byzantine forces, the caliph sent 'Ubadah with 4,000 soldiers. The four commanders were two veteran Muhajirun, Zubayr ibn al-Awwam and Miqdad ibn Aswad; a young Ansari commander named Maslama ibn Mukhallad; and 'Ubadah. These reinforcements arrived in September 640. Imam Awza'i, a Tabi'un and founder of the now extinct Awza'i madhhab, recorded that he witnessed the Muslim conquest of Egypt and confirmed that 'Ubadah was among the leaders. Amr ibn al-As decided to battle on the open field near Heliopolis in early to mid July 640. His 8,000 soldiers were led by Zubayr, 'Ubadah, Maslama, Miqdad, and Kharija ibn Hudhafa. They defeated the 20,000 strong Byzantine army under Theodore. The Muslims besieged the fortress over the course of months without a clear victory. During the siege, both sides exchanged envoys in an effort to demoralize each other. In the days leading up to the end, 'Ubadah was sent with a delegation to Muqawqis to negotiate for the last time. It is said that Muqawqis became afraid of 'Ubadah when he saw 'Ubadah's dark and majestic appearance. 'Ubadah then mocked Muqawqis in a chronicle:

Truly there are 1,000 of my comrades behind me. They are peoples who have darker skin than me and more sinister than me. if you saw them you would be more scared than you see me. I was appointed (as the leader) and my youth had passed. and praise be to Allah. You know, I'm not afraid if 100 of your people face me alone at once. so are my comrades behind me

'Ubadah gave him three options: accept Islam, pay jizyah, or fight. Following the failed negotiation, Byzantine forces decided to fight, and on the same day the fortress fell to the Muslims led Zubayr ibn al-Awwam who climbed the fortress wall alone and opened the gate from inside. After the fortress had been taken, al-Aas consulted with Maslama ibn Mukhallad. Maslama suggested that Amr give a field command to 'Ubadah to attack Alexandria. 'Ubadah rode to Amr, who gave him his spear of command. 'Ubadah rode towards the army and gave a speech before commencing his attack on Alexandria. 'Ubadah led a detachment to besiege Alexandria and reused his strategy of using trenches as he had with Latakia. When he and his main force arrived at Alexandria's outskirts, he gave a signal to the army including those hidden in the trenches to launch an assault. His attack breached and routed the Alexandrian forces on the first charge. After Alexandria, 'Ubadah stayed in Egypt to help Amr build the city of Fustat and its landmark, the Mosque of Amr ibn al-As.

=== Return to the Levant ===
'Ubadah was dispatched by Caliph Umar to assist Abu Ubaydah and Mu'awiya in Syria. Until the last years of his life, Umar wanted to appoint 'Ubadah as governor in Homs, as he thought that the grip of the caliphate and Islam was new in that area, so he wanted someone he trusted to impose strict order. 'Ubadah declined the offer and then agreed to be instead appointed as qadi in Palestine. 'Ubadah spent time during his tenure as qadi to teach the Quran and hadiths, opened a public Majlis and led sermons. 'Ubadah joined the main force of Mu'awiya to conquer Caesarea in 640 and was appointed to lead the right flank of the Mu'awiya corps during the last battle against the Romans at Qaysariyyah or Caesarea Maritima, The Muslims were repelled several times before 'Ubadah and his men crushed the Byzantine ranks in a single charge that broke the stalemate. This allowed the Muslim forces to annex the historical territory of Byzantine, which led to the formation of the Jund Filistin. This ended 'Ubadah's journey in the Levant. During this time, 'Ubadah was appointed as the first governor of Jund Filistin. Later, 'Ubadah assisted Mu'awiya to attack Amorium, 170 miles southeast of Constantinople, in the winter of 644 with a force of 10,000 men. This raiding operation started from area called Shaifa and ended in Amorium.

=== First Conquest of Cyprus ===
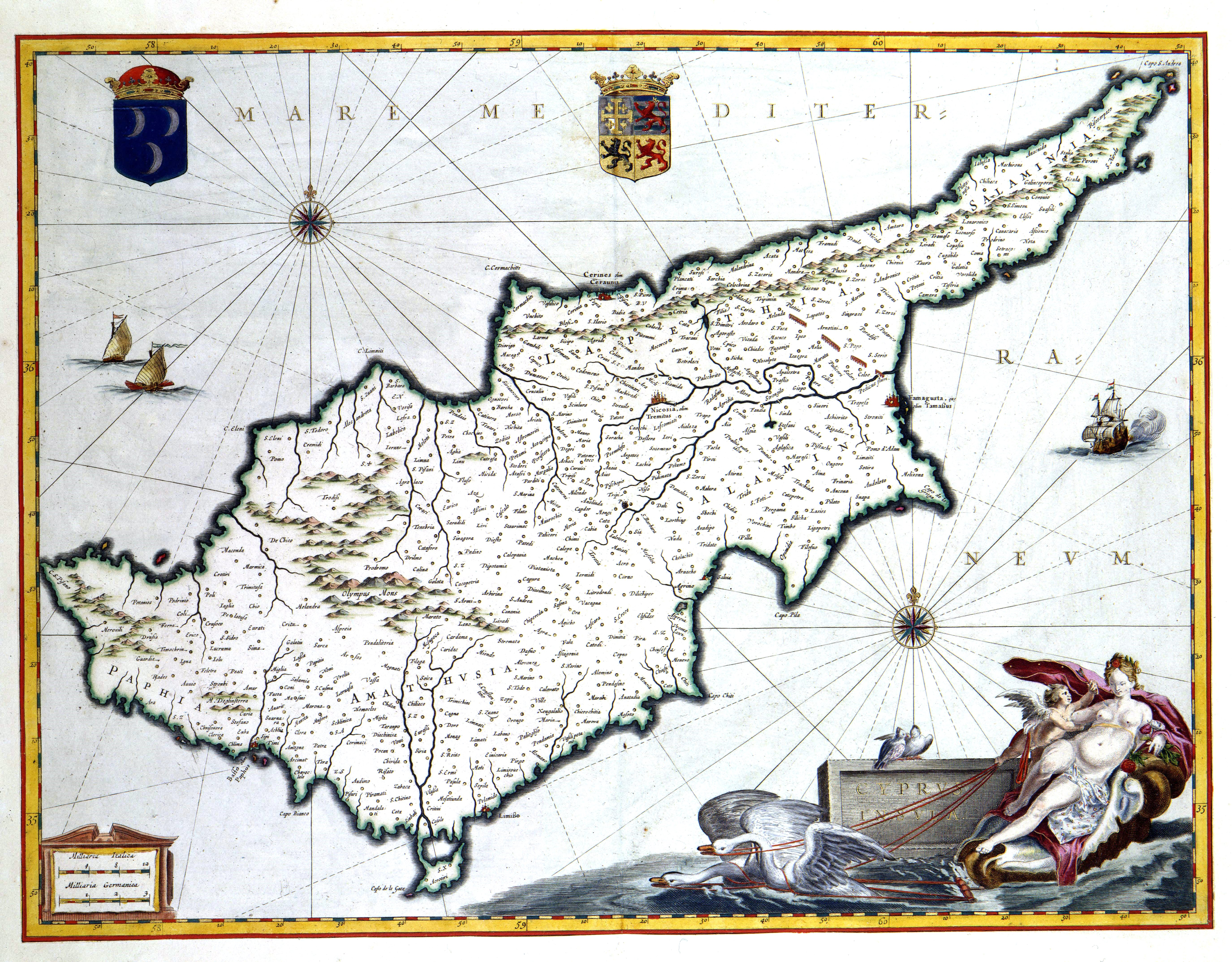
The middle age depiction of Cyprus, where 'Ubadah ibn al-Samit under Muawiyah conquered

Some-time during the Muslim conquest of the Levant, Mu'awiya asked Umar to allow him to build a navy which he would command to conquer the island of Cyprus. However, Umar felt hesitant to give permission and he instead asked the other Rashidun commanders 'Ubadah, Khalid ibn al-Walid and Amr ibn al-As. Amr expressed his doubts that the Rashidun army was ready to mount such naval operations, which prompted Umar to duly reject the proposal of Mu'awiya. When Uthman became caliph after Umar's death, Mu'awiya once again asked the Caliph to allow him to build a navy to attack Cyprus, reasoning that Cyprus had become a satellite island of Byzantine forces which could threaten the caliphate on the western banks of Palestine.

'Ubadah, along with veteran companions of Muhammad such as Miqdad ibn al-Aswad, Abu Dharr al-Ghifari, Shaddad ibn Aws, Khalid bin Zayd al-Ansari, and Abu Ayyub al-Ansari, all participated in building the caliphate's first naval armada, led by Mu'awiya. Before he joined Mu'awiya's project to build the first naval forces of the caliphate, 'Ubadah joined forces with Muslim general, Abdallah ibn Qais. Shortly after building the armada, Mu'awiya and 'Ubadah departed from Acre and left for Cyprus. According to al-Baladhuri and Khalifa ibn Khayyat, Mu'awiya and 'Ubadah led the attack and were accompanied by their wives Katwa bint Qaraza ibn Abd Amr of the Qurayshite Banu Nawfal and Umm Haram. Umm Haram died in an accident during the campaign. The Muslim forces accepted Cyprus's surrender under the condition that they refrain from hostility to Muslims, inform the Caliphate of any Byzantine movements, pay 7,200 dinars annually as the jizya, and never reveal information to outsiders regarding the caliphate's military operations.

Mu'awiya and 'Ubadah's forces pacified almost every Byzantine garrison. This is evidenced by two Greek inscriptions in the Cypriot village of Solois that note those two offensives. The entire island of Cyprus surrendered after their capital, Salamis, was surrounded and besieged. At least 50 military operations occurred in Cyprus between this first campaign carried out in 648 until the last one in 650.

==== Hadith of the Prophecy of the Conquest of Cyprus ====
Umair ibn Aswad al Ansi was once told by Umm Haram that Muhammad spoke with her:

She said: "Messenger of Allah, pray for me that I will be one of them." He said: "You are one of them." He soon was asleep again. Once more he woke up smiling and she asked him why he was smiling. His answer was the same as he gave her the first time. Again she asked him to pray to Allah to make her one of them.

He said: "No. You will be among the first ones."

Sahih Bukhari ' (Note: Similar narration was also given by 'Umair ibn Aswad al-Ansi who has been told by Umm Haram. Further record came from the testimony of an Abd al-Rahman al-Awza'i, a Tabi'un and founder of now extinct Awza'i Madhhab. Imam Awza'i saying that Ubadah was the first Wali or Caliphate Governor in Palestine.)

One of the most famous hadiths related to 'Ubadah and Umm Haram relate to the prophecy that the Islamic caliphate would dominate the sea on two occasions. This was taught by Muslim scholars as a prophecy of the conquest of Cyprus. 'Ubadah participated in both the initial conquest and the second campaign years later. Umm Haram narrated the prophecy, which she believed related to this campaign. Anas ibn Malik, her nephew, reminded them about then hadith of the promise of incoming naval conquests by Islam.

=== Second Conquest of Cyprus ===
In 652, Cyprus rebelled against the caliphate, causing Mu'awiya and 'Ubadah to mount a second campaign. This time Mu'awiya and 'Ubadah split their forces: one led by Mu'awiya and the other by Abd Allah ibn Sa'd. This punitive campaign was described in Tarikh fi Asr al-Khulafa ar-Rashidin as particularly ruthless. Many died in the campaign and many were taken captive.

After they pacified Cyprus, 'Ubadah told Mu'awiya to divide the spoils in fifths according to the teachings of Muhammad. Mu'awiya agreed with 'Ubadah's counsel and gave him the task. Afterwards, Mu'awiya consulted with one of his officers, Ismail ibn al-Ayyash, as to how to prevent another uprising. Then Mu'awiya posted a garrison of 12,000 soldiers. Mu'awiya also transferred Muslim settlers from Baalbek to Cyprus and constructed mosques there.

== Later life and death ==
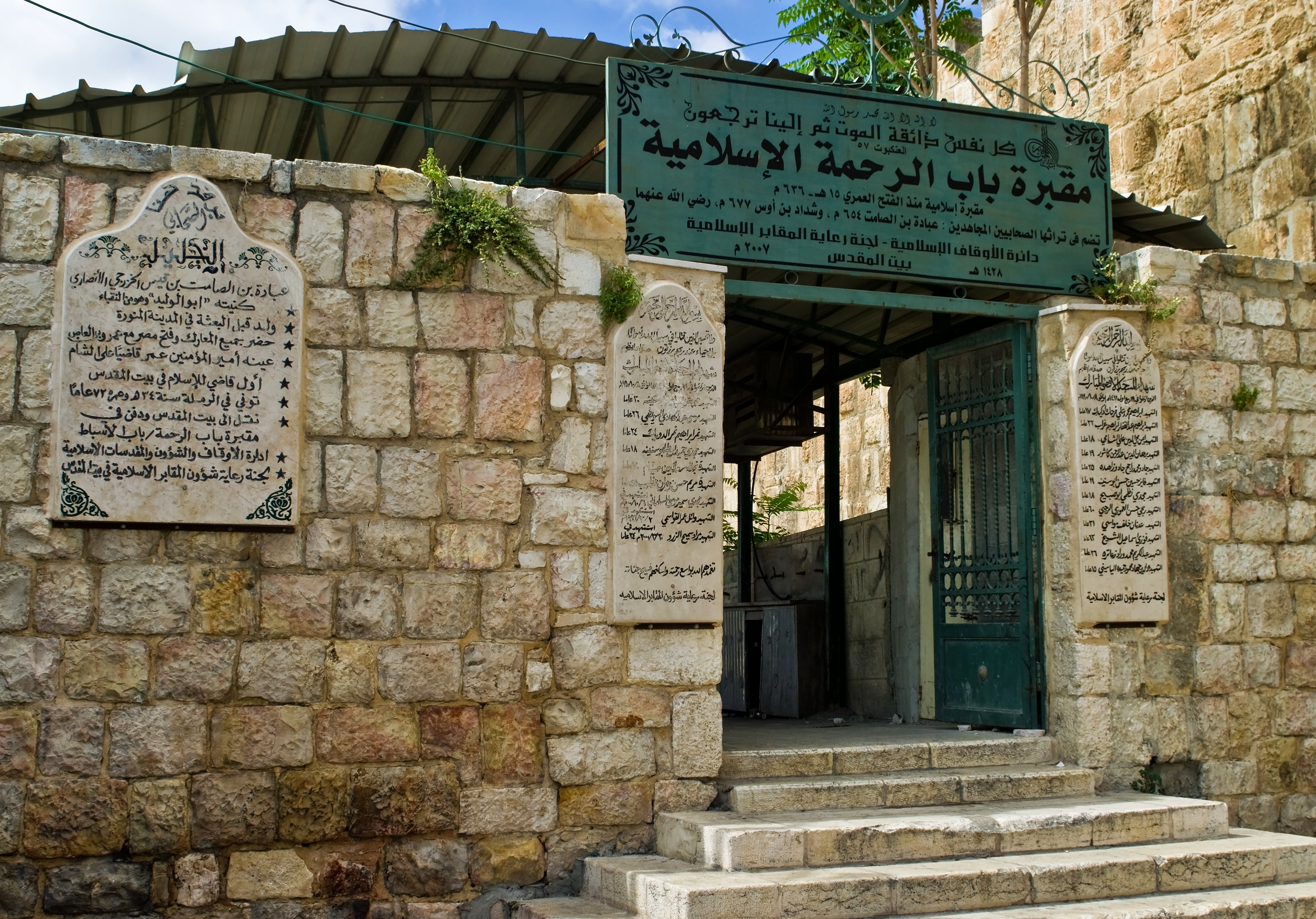
Entrance to the Bāb ar-Raḥma Cemetery, Jerusalem, where the grave of 'Ubadah ibn al-Samit located.

At the end of his military career, 'Ubadah retired to Palestine. When Caliph Uthman faced increasing opposition to his authority, 'Ubadah was among those who expressed support for him and opposed the revolts against Uthman's rule. He, Mu'awiya, Kharija ibn Hudhafa of Egypt, Anas ibn Malik, Hisham ibn Amir, Abu Darda, and Tabiin pupils of Abd Allah ibn Mas'ud were among those from outside Medina who urged the caliphate to take action against the dissidents in Medina.

'Ubadah died in Ramla at the age of 72. 'Ubadah said on his deathbed:

By Allah, every Hadith (from the Prophet) which I heard from Rasulullah Sallallahu Alaihi Wasallam. I will tell you because not long time before i leave this world, i will tell one Hadith. I have heard that Rasulullah Sallallahu Alaihi Wasallam has said: "Whoever testifies to that there is no God besides Allah and Prophet Muhammad is messenger of Allah, then Allah will forbid the hellfire to (burn) him"

== Personal information ==
=== Appearance ===
Ibn Hajar in his Siyar A'lam Nubala in the chapter of 'Ubadah describes him as physically attractive. Several historians said his enemies were awed by his appearance.

=== Family ===
'Ubadah's sister was named Nusaybah. His father was Samit Ibn Qais Ibn Asram Ibn Fahr while his mother was Qarat al-Ain Bint 'Ubadah bin Nidhal al-Khazrajiyya. His brother, 'Aws bin al-Samit, was married to Khawla bint Tha'labah, a disciple (Sahaba) of Muhammad who was mentioned in Sura Al-Mujadila.

Records from Sahih al-Bukhari and Sahih Muslim included a statement from Anas ibn Malik that 'Ubadah was married to Umm Haram bint Milhan during the first conquest of Cyprus with Mu'awiya, who died during the campaign. Ibn Hajar al-Asqalani translated this to mean 'Ubadah married Umm Haram during the campaign. However, Ibn Ishaq disagreed and translated the words of Anas to mean Umm Haram had married 'Ubadah before the campaign. Ibn Hajar argued further that another record from Ibn Hibban that stated that Umm Haram had just married 'Ubadah, which caused Ibrahim al Quraibi, author of Tarikh ul-Khulafa, to support the opinion of Ibn Hajar.

'Ubadah was also married to Jamilah bint Abi Sa'sa' and they had a son named Walid ibn 'Ubadah.

His son, Ubaydah ibn Ubadah ibn Ubadah, was buried in Egypt.

=== Character ===
During his lifetime, 'Ubadah held influence within the caliphate's administration. He was asked to pass judgements, which only a handful of Muhammad's companions were allowed during their life.

Regarding his battlefield achievements, 'Ubadah was known as a fearless warrior. Caliph Umar himself praised him as equal to 1,000 warriors. He was once recorded for displaying his personal military prowess when the Muslims had besieged a Byzantine fort. 'Ubadah was found alone praying in a field by Byzantine soldiers. Before they could approach, he jumped to his horse and advanced towards them. The Byzantine soldiers fled and were chased by 'Ubadah until they reached their fort.

He was known as a clever commander who deployed successful strategies, such as the use of ambush trenches which allowed him to conquer strongholds such as Latakia in Syria and Alexandria in Egypt.

I have sent you a reinforcements [sic] of 8.000 warriors. It consist of 4,000 mens [sic], each of 1,000 was led by four figures(including 'Ubadah) wherein each of these men strength are equal to 1,000 soldiersmens [sic]

Caliph Umar praised 'Ubadah ibn al-Samit

Muslim historians described 'Ubadah as a proud man who could not be easily intimidated during negotiation. He is known as a solemn personality who detested sycophants, which he showed at one Friday prayer in Damascus. The khatib lauded him with praise when 'Ubadah was a chief judge. He threw mud in the Khatib's face and quoted the hadith about the instruction from Muhammad to throw mud in the face of flatterers. Caliph Umar held 'Ubadah in high regard. The Caliph respected him to the extent that he gave 'Ubadah important tasks. Caliph Umar supported 'Ubadah when the latter came into dispute with Mu'awiya. The caliph appointed 'Ubadah as a judge while giving him autonomy so that Mu'awiya, who was the governor of Syria, could not interfere with his verdicts. The source of the dispute was recorded by a hadith that was graded highly by Sunan ibn Majah. The hadith explained the difference between 'Ubadah and Mu'awiya regarding the permissibility of transactions using gold to exchange with coin of Dinar and silver with coin of Dirham.

== Legacy ==
The Messenger of Allah said, "Who among you will give me his pledge to do three things?" He then recited the verses 151–153 of Al-An'am. He then said, "Whoever fulfills (this pledge), then his reward will be with Allah, but whoever fell into shortcomings and Allah punishes him for it in this life, then that will be his recompense. Whoever Allah delays (his reckoning) until the Hereafter, then his matter is with Allah. If He wills, He will punish him, and if He wills, He will forgive him.

Al-Mustadrak ala al-Sahihayn records of 'Ubadah narration regarding the pledge of Aqaba

Sunni scholars classified 'Ubadah as among the higher-ranked companions of Muhammad. At least five reasons are stated by scholars that ranked 'Ubadah in such saintly venerable status according to the traditions of Islamic scholars:

- His attendance at the Pledges of Allegiance in Aqaba, which inaugurated an honorific title of Al-Aqabi.
- His status as Ansar, which inaugurated the honorific title of "Al-Ansari". Furthermore, The embeddings of 'Ansari by Muhammad in various Quran verses and hadith were viewed as a special status in Islam. Two patrons of hadith, Muslim and Bukhari, compiled special chapters regarding the Ansar. Nasiruddin al Albani highlighted the hadith from Muslim, that the Ansar is "the best tribe in human history until end of times". Ibn Hajar Al-Asqalani recorded and gave commentary in his book, Fath al-Bari, regarding the hadith that loving and caring the Ansaris are required Muslims, while bearing ill will towards the Ansaris and their families were sign of hypocrisy.
- His participation in the Battle of Badr, which inaugurated the honorific title of "Al-Badri". His status as a veteran is special in the eyes of scholars as Muhammad regarded those of his companions who attended the Battle of Badr as among the most important in Islam.
- His participation in the Battle of Uhud, which inaugurated the honorific title of "Al-Uhudi".
- His attendance at the Pledge of the Tree. Rashid Rida explained that everyone who took the pledge were regarded by Islamic teachings as special. This explanation is in line with Ibn Hajar al-Asqalani's explanation of the hadith in Sahih Bukhari regarding pledge attendance, which resulted to the revelation regarding God's will towards them.

Early Muslim scholars supported scholarly knowledge of 'Ubadah's status as evidenced from Ahmad ibn Hanbal. Al-Dhahabi listed a specific chapter of his biography in his Siyar a'lam Nubala.

=== Quran ===
Muhammad ibn Ka'b al-Qurazi narrated that during the time of Muhammad, 'Ubadah was among those who collected and wrote down the Quran along with Muadh ibn Jabal, Ubayy ibn Ka'b, Abu Ayyub al-Ansari, and Abu al-Darda. Quranic experts generally accepted 'Ubadah's participation in the Pledge of the Tree mentioned in verses 55–56 of Surah Al-Ma'idah, which is one of the factors that makes 'Ubadah venerated. Furthermore, traditions from Al-Tabarani and Bayhaqi agreed that the revelation of verse 51 to 52 of Surah Al-Ma'idah was also linked with 'Ubadah. Where the verses reprimanded 'Ubadah to not follow the path of hypocrites like Abd-Allah ibn Ubayy who took companionship from heretics like Jews and Christians. Those verses are believed by Muslims to be the revision of the Ten Commandments according to Islam. Either as revealed to Moses originally or as taken by Muslims now: 'Ubadah was reportedly one of the earliest figures to teach Quran exegesis. Hammam ibn Munabbih, a Tabi'un who authored one of the oldest hadith collections, reported that 'Ubadah was trusted by Muhammad to tutor the disciples of Suffah the art of writing and imparting tafsir of Quran

=== Hadith & Legal Veridcts ===
'Ubadah was among the few companions of Muhammad who were allowed to give Fatwa verdicts. Due to his transmission of so many Hadith narrations from Muhammad, Muslim scholars across generations have generally viewed him as one of Islam's patrons of knowledge, and have borrowed traditions from 'Ubadah as the basis for various rulings in Sunni Islam, including the observance of Islamic teachings, mysticism, eschatological, ethics or jurisprudence. In al-Dhahabi's book Siyar a'lam al-nubala, he recorded that at least one hundred and eighty-one (181) Hadiths were narrated by 'Ubadah.

Numerous Hadith for the observances of Islamic faith were transmitted by 'Ubadah, such as the Hadith about five daily prayers. This Hadith was deemed authentic by Imam Al-Nasa'i. Another Hadith that has been used by scholars was narrated by Ibn Shihab al-Zuhri. He attributed it to 'Ubadah through Mahmud ibn al-Rabi. This Hadith became a basis of later Fiqh scholars to formulate the ruling that Surah Al-Fatiha was obligatory to be recited in every ritual prayer of Salat. Another Hadith transmitted by 'Ubadah was used as a metric by Muslims to measure the existence and omens of Laylat al-Qadr, a special occasion for Muslims that occurred once a year, which are found in the works of Ahmad ibn Hanbal

"Did not the Prophet, Peace and Allah blessing belong upon him, said that when we saw a person extolling virtues to his face, then we should throw mud to his face?

Ubadah ibn al-Samit admonished someone who fawning to him excessively by quoting a hadith

On the field of Mysticism regarding the teachings of Islam, Hadith from 'Ubadah were compiled by Abu Dawud regarding a dream of Mumin or true believer of Islam as one of Muhammad's forty miracles. The chains were deemed authentic by the Hadith critics, while the exegete commentary of Abu Hurayra from the classical era preserved by Mahmud ibn Ghaylan translated this Hadith to mean that sometimes, proof of Muhammad prophecies and signs of Quran and Sunnah appear in the dreams of believers.

In Islamic jurisprudence, scholars from Hanafi, Hanbali, Shafii, Maliki and other smaller and extinct Madhhabs like the school of Sufyan al-Thawri took the Hadith regarding governorship and conduct of ruling that loyalty and obedience to the rightful rulers or leaders are a part of Muslim obligation and as a basis of Sharia law about government authority. The exemplary Hadith of 'Ubadah deemed important by Maliki Madhab regarding transactions was recorded by the founder of Maliki Madhhab, Malik ibn Anas in his book Muwatta Imam Malik, which was also deemed authentic by Muslim ibn al-Hajjaj in his Hadith compilation.

Modern contemporary scholars such as Grand Mufti of Saudi Arabia based their fatwas on the basis of Ubadah's Hadiths on transactions in Islam, Hajj rituals, divorces, and oaths. Meanwhile, the Sharia law about adultery are also found from Ubadah's narration of Hadith.

==== Jihad and laws of war ====
'Ubadah passed down Hadith that ruled the administration of Spoils of War such as the one after they pacified Cyprus for the second time. 'Ubadah told Mu'awiya to share the spoils that were acquired through military campaigns according to the Sunnah, which must be divided in fifths. In response Mu'awiya tasked 'Ubadah to manage the spoils.

On smaller scale operations, such as limited military raids, a hadith says 'Ubadah said that Muhammad "awarded one quarter of the spoils to those who attacked the enemy at the beginning and one third to those who attacked at the end". Hanafi scholar Muhammad 'Abid al-Sindi preserved the exegesis from Ali ibn Muhammad al-Shaddad, that this Hadith rules that those involved in the start of the fight have right of one quarter of the spoils, while those who participated later acquired one third of the spoils.

==== Hadith of the usury ====
Perhaps the most impactful hadith narrated by 'Ubadah were hadiths that focus on riba or usury. It rules out hand-to-hand transactions of commodities. It requires that only similar items be traded, except where the transaction consisted of two different commodities. The exegete scholars agreed that this tradition from 'Ubadah covered at least one of the six types of riba, Riba al Fadhl type, which rules that an increase in one of the two exchanged ribawi items that are of the same nature and type. Thus, on the scope of Madhhab schools, four major Madhhabs, along with Zahiri, unanimously agreed on the implementation of bans for such types of Riba. Although the degree of the ban differs among those Madhhabs, such as that Hanbalis disagreed with Hanafis' total ban for any items, as Hanbalis argues on the basis of Said ibn al-Musayyib reasoning, that the Hadith of 'Ubadah were limited to foodstuffs, as non-consumable items were exempted. Sa'ib used another authentic Hadith from Abu Sa'id al-Khudri to regard this matter as counterargument.

Historical usage of this Hadith from 'Ubadah was found, as 'Ubadah tried to implemented the Hadith during the campaign of Cyprus. However, Sunan ibn Majah recorded that during his tenure as judge in Homs, this effort of 'Ubadah to implement the rule became the source of a dispute between 'Ubadah and city governor Mu'awiya. 'Ubadah argued by basing his argument from this Hadith of usury that Islam forbid the unequal exchanging of goods unless they were of similar quality, in this case the exchange of gold to with dinar and dirham. 'Ubadah viewed that it falls under a practice of Riba, while Mu'awiya argued that there was no element of usury, except given delays in a transaction. (Note: This report of dispute between Ubadah with Mu'awiyah were supported by record of Al-Nasa'i) This Hadith was enough to overrule the early verdict regarding Riba by Ibn Abbas, another companion of the Muhammad with similarly high rank. Previously Ibn Abbas gave a less strict verdict regarding Riba, thus in the end Ubadah's ruling regarding Riba or Usury prevailed in opinions from majority of their peers, and caused Ibn Abbas to withdraw his previous rulings.

=== Architecture ===
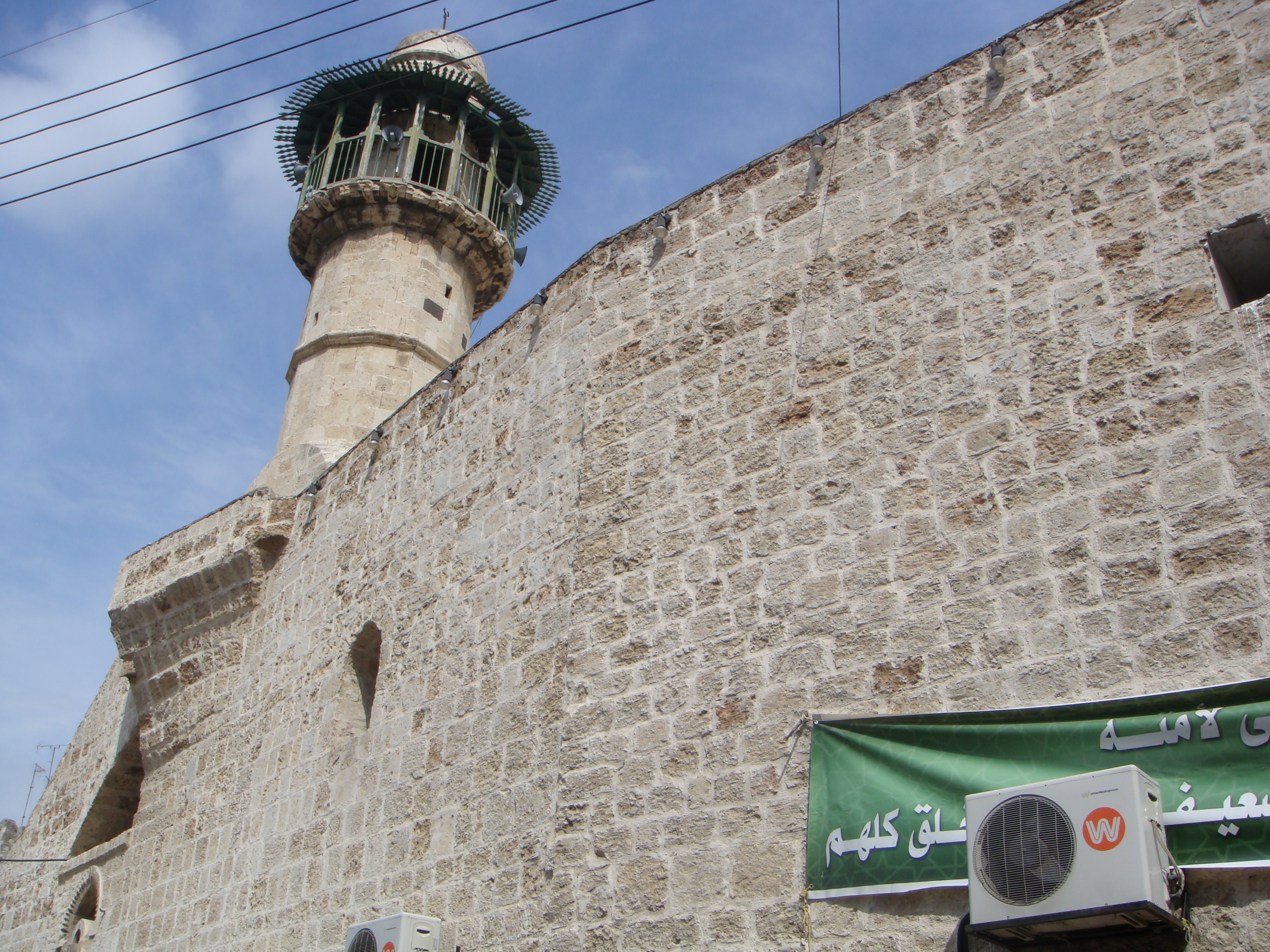
Jami' al-Bazaar mosque in Latakia built by 'Ubadah ibn al-Samit during conquest of Levant

'Ubadah demonstrated his skill as an architect after the conquest of Latakia. While he administered the city, he built the Great Mosque of al-Bazaar. The mosque has two western entrances. South of the mosque, leading to its courtyard is an open space recently roofed with raspberry boards. From the eastern side, two spaces open in front of the mosque, a rectangle covered with six stone arches, and a medium-sized minaret stands on its highest base. The mosque does not contain artistic touches except for some decorations on the entrance and the minaret. On the western side of the mosque is an old bathroom.

Another example of his architecture is when he ended the conquest in Egypt with al-Aas. He was involved in planning and developing Fustat and in constructing the first mosque in Egypt, known as the mosque of Amr bin al-As. He, along with other companions such as Zubayr ibn al-Awwam, Abu Darda, and Miqdad ibn Amr al-Aswad, also constructed and decided the Qibla or direction of prayer of the mosque.

=== Descendants and social developments ===
'Ubadah is revered by many Palestinian Arab communities who preserve his tomb in Ramla. Historical book author Simon Sebag Montefiore wrote that the keeper of 'Ubadah's tomb hails from the Nusaybah family, a modern Arabic family that claims to be descendants of 'Ubadah and Nusaybah, his sister. The Palestinian Arabs regard him as an influential figure as evidenced by the public sermon by Dr. Yusuf Juma Salama, one of the official khattib of Al-Aqsa Mosque who spoke of 'Ubadah as the first judge of Palestine. A notable descendant was Sari Nusseibeh, a Palestinian Professor of Philosophy and former President of Al-Quds University. Another prominent descendant was Sadr al-Shari'a al-Thani, a Hanafi scholar, and Maturidi philosophist.

'Ubadah influenced the Ansari descendants of later generations, who held elite positions in various areas, particularly Hejaz.

Regarding 'Ubadah legacy of emancipation, Mustafa al-Siba'i noted that emancipation within Islam was apparent due to the fact that there were one thousand (1,000) black skinned warriors under his command. 'Ubadah rebuked the racist attitude shown by scared, yet scornful Muqawqis towards black peoples during the negotiation of the latter's surrender during the conquest of Egypt.

== See also ==
- Arab conquest of Egypt
- Jund Filastin
- Muslim conquest of Syria
- Rashidun Caliphate
- Ṣaḥābah who have visited Lebanon
- Second pledge at al-Aqabah

== Sources ==
=== Primary sources ===
- Recorded traditional oral narration of historical events during the early time of Islam of Urwah ibn Zubayr, an historian during Rashidun era.
- Earliest records of Maghazi (historical records regarding Islamic conquests) of Muhammad by Tabi'in historian Aban ibn Uthman
- Recorded narrations of Maghazi classifications by Ibn Shihab al-Zuhri
- Musnad Ahmad ibn Hanbal, which contains many scarces of historical account regarding military activity during the time of Muhammad and four righteous guided caliphate
- Sahih Bukhari Chapter 57: Book of Jihad, regarding ethics and basics of warfare according to Islamic tradition
- Sahih Muslim Chapter 19: KITAB AL-JIHAD WA'L-SIYAR (The Book of Jihad And Expedition), regarding ethics and conduct during wartime
- Bulugh al-Maram Chapter 10. The book of Jihad. treatise regarding basis of military conducts and treatise attributed to Shafiʽite scholar Ibn Hajar al-Asqalani.
- Siyar a'lam al-nubala historical and biographical accounts of companions of miasmas, authored by Al-Dhahabi.
- Sīrat Rasūl Allāh (Biography of the prophet of Allah) by Ibn Hisham
- Sunan al-Kubra lil Behaqi, commonly known as Sunan al-Bayhaqi; authored by al-Bayhaqi
- al-Muʿjam al-Kabīr; Al-Mu'jam al-Awsat; and Al-Mu'jam as-Saghir, Three compilations of Hadith authored by Al-Tabarani
- Masabih al-Sunnah contained narrations of the peoples who lived during the Rashidun conquests, including those directly involved in the conquest. Authored by Al-Baghawi
- Al-Sirah al-Nabawiyyah (The Life of the Prophet)', an edited recension by Ibn Isḥāq
- Historical excerpts from Abu Bakr al-Zubaydi, scholar and historian from the Caliphate of Córdoba
- Futuh al-Buldan, The Conquest of (the) countries, a work regarding early Islamic conquest 9th century historian Ahmad Ibn Yahya al-Baladhuri of Abbasid-era Baghdad
- Kitab al-Tarikh wa al-Maghazi (Arabic: كتاب التاريخ والمغازي, "Book of History and Campaigns") by al-Waqidi
- Al-Bidayah wa Nihayah; authored by Ibn Kathir
- Kitāb aṭ-Tabaqāt al-Kabīr (transl. The Book of the Major Classes), eight-volume work contains the lives of Muhammad, his Companions and Helpers, including those who fought at the Battle of Badr as a special class, and of the following generation, the Followers, who received their traditions from the Companions, authored by Ibn Sa'd
- Usd al-ghabah fi marifat al-Saḥabah (The Lions of the Forest and the knowledge about the Companions), a biographical work about Muhammad and 7,554 of his companions, authored by Ali ibn al-Athir

=== Secondary sources ===
- al-Dihlawī, Muḥammad Yūsuf ibn Muḥammad Ilyās Kāndihlawī (1991). Ḥayātuṣ-ṣaḥābah The Lives of the Sahabah · Volume 1. Darul Ishaat. p. 401. ISBN 978-81-7101-098-1.
- al-Ghazali, Mohammad Rumaizuddin (2009). 10 Tokoh Sarjana Islam Paling Berpengaruh (ten most influential Islamic scholars). PTS Islamika. p. 19. ISBN 978-967-5137-12-9.
- Gil, Moshe (1997). A History of Palestine, 634-1099. Cambridge University press. p. 119. ISBN 0-521-59984-9.
- le Strange, Guy (1890). Palestine Under the Moslems: A Description of Syria and the Holy Land from A.D. 650 to 1500. Committee of the Palestine Exploration Fund. p. 493. "Lajjun Guy le Strange."
- Lynch, Ryan J. (July–September 2016). "Cyprus and Its Legal and Historiographical Significance in Early Islamic History". Journal of the American Oriental Society. 136 (3): 535–550. doi:10.7817/jameroriesoci.136.3.0535. JSTOR 10.7817/jameroriesoci.136.3.0535.
- al-Misri, Mahmud (2015). Sahabat-Sahabat Rasulullah vol 1: Zubair bin Awwam. Companion of the Prophet. Vol. 1 (Ind ed.). Pustaka Ibnu Katsir. ISBN 978-979-1294-38-6.
- Pipes, Daniel (1980). "Black Soldiers in Early Muslim Armies". The International Journal of African Historical Studies. 13 (1): 87–94. doi:10.2307/218374. JSTOR 218374.
- Nawhami, Muhammad Saifur Rahman (2017). "Sadr al-Sharī'ah al-Asghar: Ubaydullah bin Mas'ūd al-Mahbūbi al-Bukhāri". DIBAJ Islamic Studies Bulletin, Number 4 (2013). IlmGate.
- Nusseibeh, Sari (2009) [2007]. Once Upon A Country: A Palestinian Life. London: Halban Publishers. ISBN 978-1-905559-05-3.
- Schulze, Wolfgang (1973). "The Byzantine-Arab Transitional Coinage of Ṭarṭūs". The Numismatic Chronicle. 173: 245–259. JSTOR 43859740.
- Sebag Montefore, Simon (2012). Jerusalem: The Biography. Pustaka Alvabet. p. 226. ISBN 978-602-9193-02-2.
- Sulaymān ibn al-Ashʻath al-Sijistānī, Abu Dawud (1984). Sunan Abi Dawud. Sh. M. Ashraf. p. 1012. ISBN 978-969-432-097-7.
