= Rashidpur =

Rashidpur may refer to:

== Places ==
- Rashidpur, Raebareli, a village in Uttar Pradesh, India
- Rashidpur Garhi, a census town in Uttar Pradesh
- Rashidpur Kaneta, a village in Firozabad district, Uttar Pradesh
- Rashidpur Gas Field, a gas field in Bangladesh
- Rashid Pur Altabari, a village in Bihar, India
