= Seraph =

Type of angel in Abrahamic religions

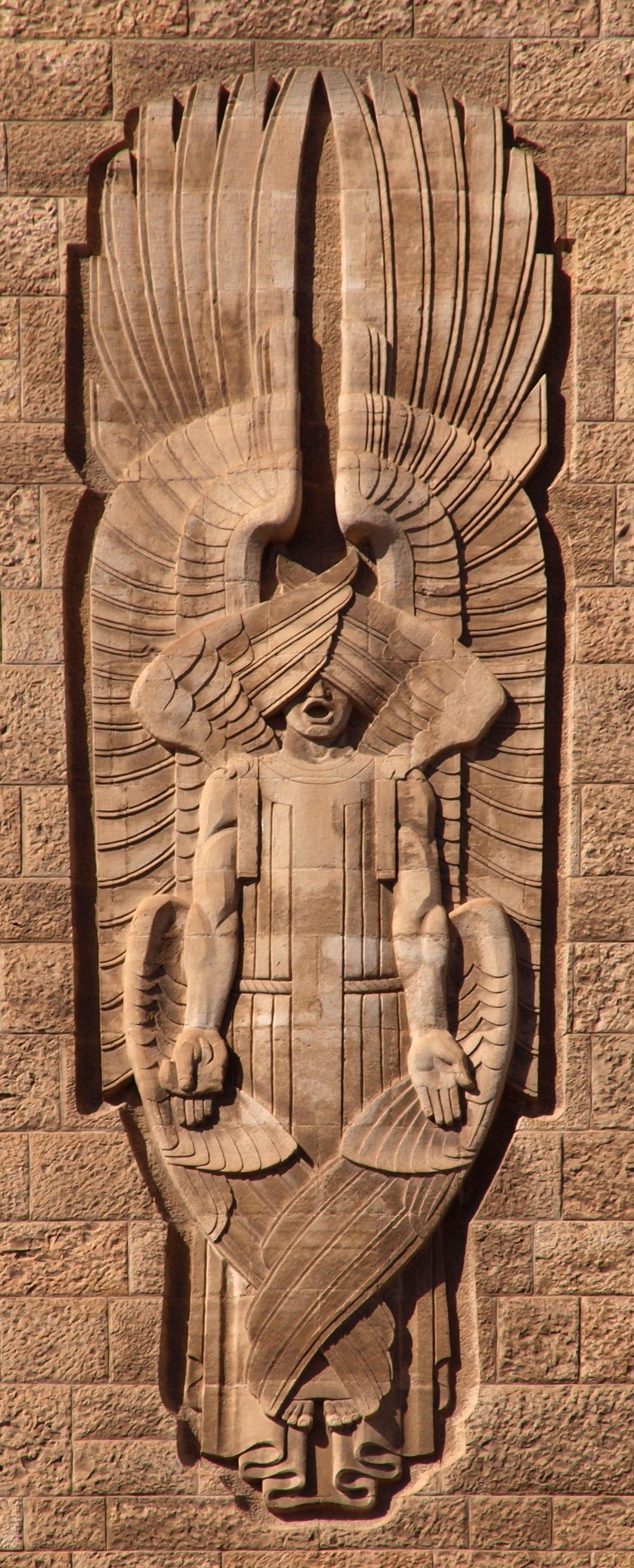
Bas relief of a seraph carrying a hot coal on the walls of the Jerusalem International YMCA.

A seraph (Hebrew: שָׂרָף, romanized: sārāf /ˈsɛrəf/; plural seraphim Hebrew: שְׂרָפִים, romanized: sərāfīm /ˈsɛrəfɪm/) (Note: In the King James Version also plural seraphims. From Hebrew: שָׂרָף (śārāf [saːraːf]), plural שְׂרָפִים (śərāfîm [səraːfim]); Latin: seraphim, plural seraphin (also seraphus (-i, m.)); Greek: σεραφείμ (serapheím); cf. Arabic: مشرفين (musharifin). The singular "seraph" is a back-formation from the Hebrew plural-form 'seraphim', whereas in Hebrew the singular is 'saraph'.) is a celestial or heavenly being originating in Ancient Judaism. The term plays a role in subsequent Judaism, Christianity, and Islam.

Tradition places seraphim in the highest rank in Christian angelology and in the fifth rank of ten in the Jewish angelic hierarchy. A seminal passage in the Book of Isaiah (Isaiah 6:1–8) used the term to describe six-winged beings that fly around the Throne of God crying out "holy, holy, holy". This throne scene, with its triple invocation of holiness, profoundly influenced subsequent theology, literature, and art. Its influence is frequently seen in works depicting angels, heaven, and apotheosis. Seraphim are mentioned as celestial beings in the semicanonical Book of Enoch and the canonical Book of Revelation.

== Origins and development ==
Ancient Aramean six-winged deity, from Tell Halaf (10th century BCE)

In Hebrew, the word saraph, meaning "burning", is used seven times throughout the text of the Hebrew Bible as a noun, usually to denote "serpent", twice in the Book of Numbers, once in the Book of Deuteronomy, and four times in the Book of Isaiah. The reason why the word for "burning" was also used to denote a serpent is not universally agreed upon; it may be due to a certain snake species' fiery colors, or perhaps the burning sensation left by its venomous bite. Regardless, its plural form, seraphim, occurs in both Numbers and Isaiah, but only in Isaiah is it used to denote an angelic being; likewise, these angels are referred to only as the plural seraphim – Isaiah later uses the singular saraph to describe a "fiery flying serpent", in line with the other uses of the term throughout the Hebrew Bible.

A consensus is emerging that the motifs used to display seraphs in Hyksos-era Canaan had their original sources in Egyptian uraeus iconography. In Egyptian iconography, the uraeus was used as a symbol of sovereignty, royalty, divinity, and divine authority, and later iconography often showed uraei with wings. In the early monarchic period of Israel and Judah, Egyptian motifs were evidently borrowed by the Israelites en masse, as a plethora of personal seals belonging to classes ranging from commonfolk to royalty have been discovered, which incorporate several pieces of ancient Egyptian iconography, including the winged sun, ankh, the hedjet and deshret crowns of Upper and Lower Egypt, scarabs, and the uraeus cobra. These uraei often had four wings, as opposed to the Egyptian standard, which only gave them two. These images have been connected with the seraphim angels associated with Isaiah's visions or perhaps more directly to the aforementioned "fiery flying serpent", but this continues to be debated – and an image of serpentine seraphim clashes with Isaiah's own vision, which clearly envisioned seraphim with heads, legs, and arms – although, on the second matter, some scholars have proposed that the covered "feet" of the seraphim should be identified as genitals, as "feet" are often used in the Hebrew Bible as a euphemism for the penis.

The vision in Isaiah Chapter 6 of seraphim in an idealized version of Solomon's Temple represents the sole instance in the Hebrew Bible of this word being used to describe celestial beings. "... I saw also the Lord sitting upon a throne, high and lifted up, and his train filled the temple. Above it stood the seraphim: each one had six wings; with twain he covered his face, and with twain he covered his feet, and with twain he did fly." (Isaiah 6:1–3) And one cried to another, "Holy, holy, holy, is YHWH of hosts: the whole earth is full of His glory." (verses 2–3) One seraph carries out an act of ritual purification for the prophet by touching his lips with a live coal from the altar (verses 6–7) "And he laid it upon my mouth, and said, Lo, this hath touched thy lips; and thine iniquity is taken away, and thy sin purged."

The text describes the "seraphim" as winged celestial beings with a fiery passion for doing God's good work. Notwithstanding the wording of the text itself, at least one Hebrew scholar claims that in the Hebrew Bible, the seraphim do not have the status of angels, and that only in later sources (such as De Coelesti Hierarchia or Summa Theologiae) are they considered to be a division of the divine messengers.

Seraphim appear in the second-century BC Book of Enoch, where they are mentioned, in conjunction with cherubim, as the heavenly creatures standing nearest to the throne of God. In nonbiblical sources, they are sometimes called the Akyəst (Ge'ez: አክይስት "serpents" or "dragons", an alternate term for Hell).

In the Second Book of Enoch, two classes of celestial beings are mentioned alongside the seraphim and cherubim, known as the phoenixes and the chalkydri (Ancient Greek: χαλκύδραι khalkýdrai, compound of χαλκός khalkós "brass, copper" + ὕδρα hýdra "hydra", "water-serpent"—lit. "brazen hydras", "copper serpents"). Both are described as "flying elements of the sun" that reside in either the fourth or seventh heaven, who have 12 wings and burst into song at sunrise.

In the Book of Revelation (4:4–8), the living creatures (τὸ ζῷον) are described as being forever in God's presence and praising him: "And they rest not day and night, saying, 'Holy, holy, holy, Lord God Almighty, which was, and is, and is to come.'" This account differs slightly from the account of Isaiah, stating in the eighth verse: "The four living creatures, each having six wings, were full of eyes around and within" (NKJV translation). They appear also in the Gnostic text, On the Origin of the World.

== In Judaism ==
The 12th-century scholar Maimonides placed the seraphim in the fifth of ten ranks of angels in his exposition of the Jewish angelic hierarchy. In Kabbalah, the seraphim are the higher angels of the World of Beriah ("Creation", first created realm, divine understanding), whose understanding of their distance from the absolute divinity of Atziluth causes their continual "burning up" in self-nullification. Through this they ascend to God, and return to their place. Below them in the World of Yetzirah ("Formation", archetypal creation, divine emotions) are the Hayot angels of Ezekiel's vision, who serve God with self-aware instinctive emotions ("face of a lion, ox, eagle"). Seraphim are part of the angelarchy of modern Orthodox Judaism. Isaiah's vision is repeated several times in daily Jewish services, including at Kedushah prayer as part of the repetition of the Amidah, and in several other prayers as well. Conservative Judaism retains the traditional doctrines regarding angels and includes references to them in the liturgy, although a literal belief in angels is by no means universal among adherents. Adherents of Reform Judaism and Reconstructionist Judaism generally take images of angels as symbolic.

A Judean seal from the eighth century BCE depicts them as flying asps, yet having human characteristics, as encountered by Isaiah in his commissioning as a prophet.

== In Christianity ==
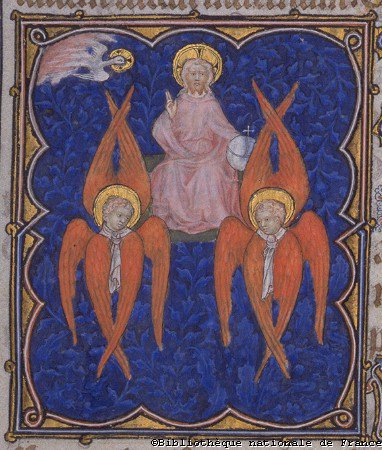
Seraphim surround the divine throne in this illustration from the Petites Heures de Jean de Berry, a 14th-century illuminated manuscript, commissioned by John, Duke of Berry.

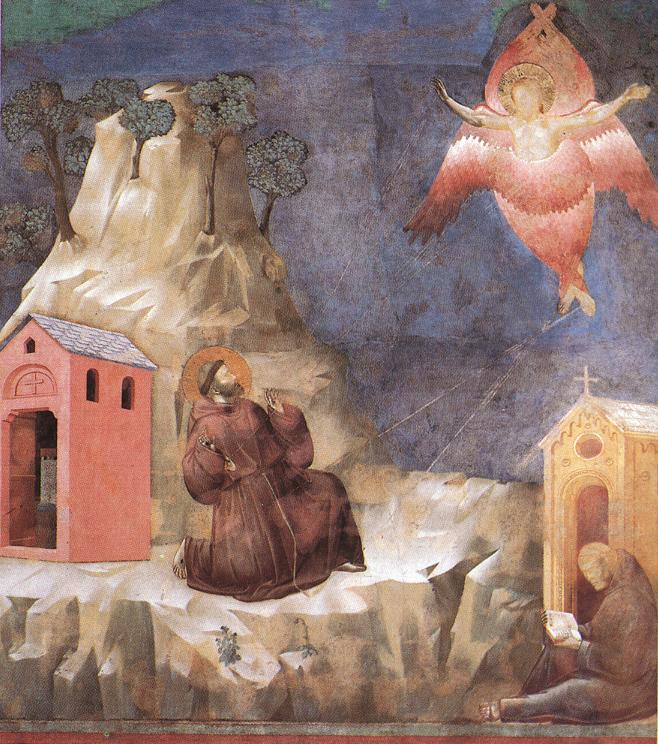
St. Francis' vision of a seraph (fresco attributed to Giotto) (1267–1337)

Medieval Christian theology places seraphim in the highest choir of the angelic hierarchy. They are the caretakers of God's throne, continuously singing "holy, holy, holy". Pseudo-Dionysius the Areopagite in his Celestial Hierarchy (vii), drew upon the Book of Isaiah in fixing the fiery nature of seraphim in the medieval imagination. Seraphim, in his view, helped God maintain perfect order and are not limited to chanting the trisagion. Taking his cue as well from writings in the Rabbinic tradition, the author gave an etymology for the Seraphim as "those who kindle or make hot".

The name seraphim clearly indicates their ceaseless and eternal revolution about Divine Principles, their heat and keenness, the exuberance of their intense, perpetual, tireless activity, and their elevative and energetic assimilation of those below, kindling them and firing them to their own heat, and wholly purifying them by a burning and all-consuming flame; and by the unhidden, unquenchable, changeless, radiant and enlightening power, dispelling and destroying the shadows of darkness

Origen wrote in On First Principles that the Seraphim, in the Book of Isaiah, are the physical representation of the Christ and the Holy Spirit. His rationale comes from the idea that nothing "can wholly know the beginnings of all things and the ends of the universe" aside from God. Origen concludes this section in writing about the Seraphim as beings that have the knowledge of God revealed to them, which elevates the role of the Seraphim to divine levels:

Nevertheless whatever it is that these powers may have learned through the revelation of the Son of God and of the Holy Spirit-and they will certainly be able to acquire a great deal of knowledge, and the higher ones much more than the lower-still it is impossible for them to comprehend everything; for it is written, 'The more part of God's works are secret.

This quote suggests that Origen believed the Seraphim are revealed this knowledge because of their anointed status as Son of God and the Holy Spirit. He was later criticized for making such claims and branded a heretic by the Chalcedonian Church at the Second Council of Constantinople. His theory about the Seraphim, though, as referred to in Isaiah, would be reflected in other early Christian literature, as well as early Christian belief through the second century.

Thomas Aquinas in his Summa Theologiae offers a description of the nature of seraphim:

The name "Seraphim" does not come from charity only, but from the excess of charity, expressed by the word ardor or fire. Hence, Dionysius (Coel. Hier. vii) expounds the name "Seraphim" according to the properties of fire, containing an excess of heat. Now in fire we may consider three things.

First, the movement which is upwards and continuous. This signifies that they are borne inflexibly towards God.

Secondly, the active force which is "heat", which is not found in fire simply, but exists with a certain sharpness, as being of most penetrating action, and reaching even to the smallest things, and as it were, with superabundant fervor; whereby is signified the action of these angels, exercised powerfully upon those who are subject to them, rousing them to a like fervor, and cleansing them wholly by their heat.

Thirdly, we consider in fire the quality of clarity, or brightness; which signifies that these angels have in themselves an inextinguishable light, and that they also perfectly enlighten others.

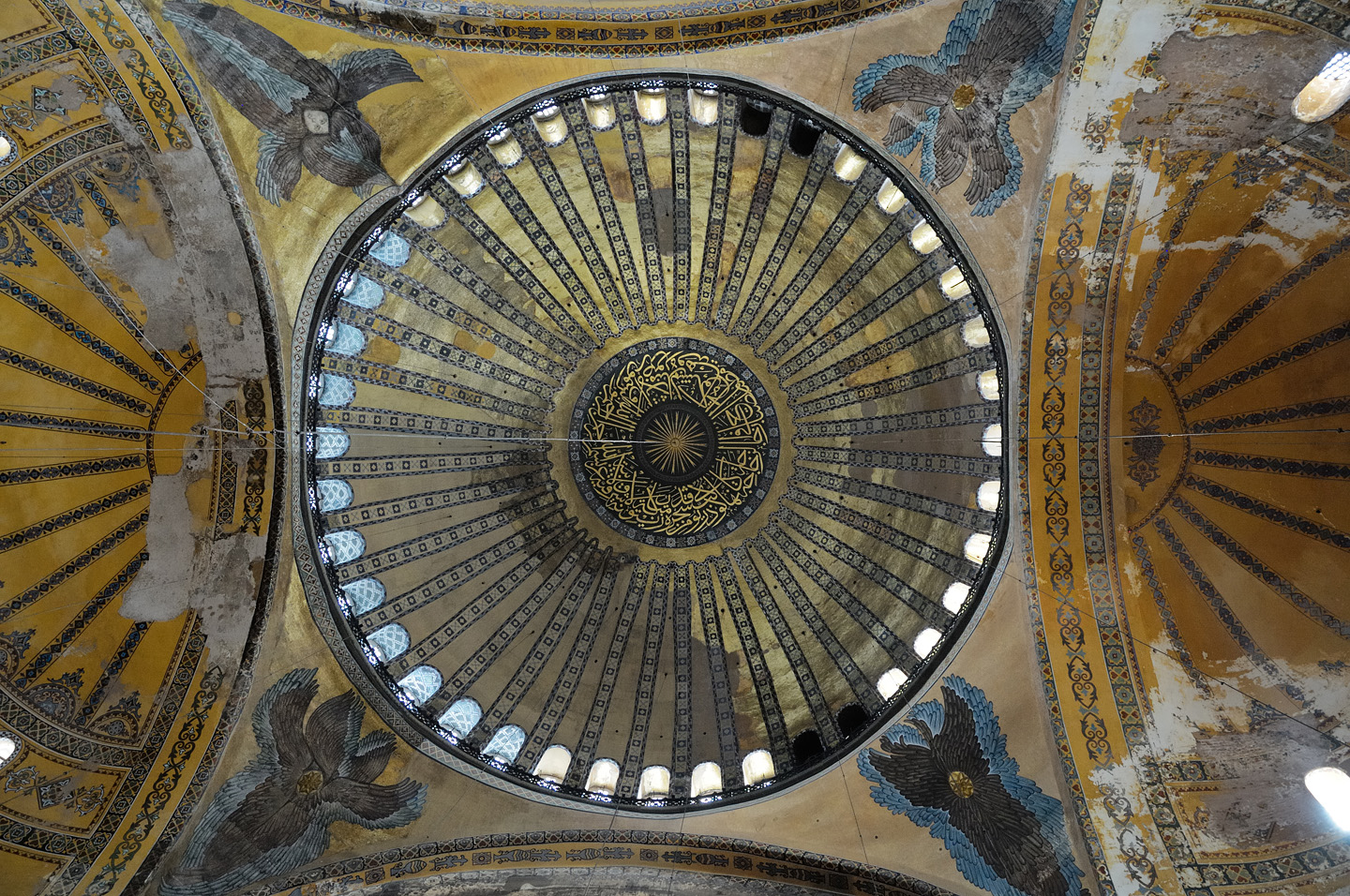
Seraphim figures in Hagia Sophia.

The seraphim took on a mystic role in Giovanni Pico della Mirandola's Oration on the Dignity of Man (1487), the epitome of Renaissance humanism. Pico took the fiery Seraphim—"they burn with the fire of charity"—as the highest models of human aspiration: "impatient of any second place, let us emulate dignity and glory. And, if we will it, we shall be inferior to them in nothing", the young Pico announced, in the first flush of optimistic confidence in the human capacity that is the coinage of the Renaissance. "In the light of intelligence, meditating upon the Creator in His work, and the work in its Creator, we shall be resplendent with the light of the Cherubim. If we burn with love for the Creator only, his consuming fire will quickly transform us into the flaming likeness of the Seraphim."

Bonaventure, a Franciscan theologian who was a contemporary of Aquinas', uses the six wings of the seraph as an important analogical construct in his mystical work The Journey of the Mind to God.

Christian theology developed an idea of seraphim as beings of pure light who enjoy direct communication with God.

The plural form of the word, seraphim, was given to Seraphim of Sarov upon his reception into the Sarov monastery. This later inspired Eugene Dennis Rose, a former student of Alan Watts', to adopt the name when he also entered Orthodox monasticism, later becoming known as Fr Seraphim Rose.

== In Islam ==
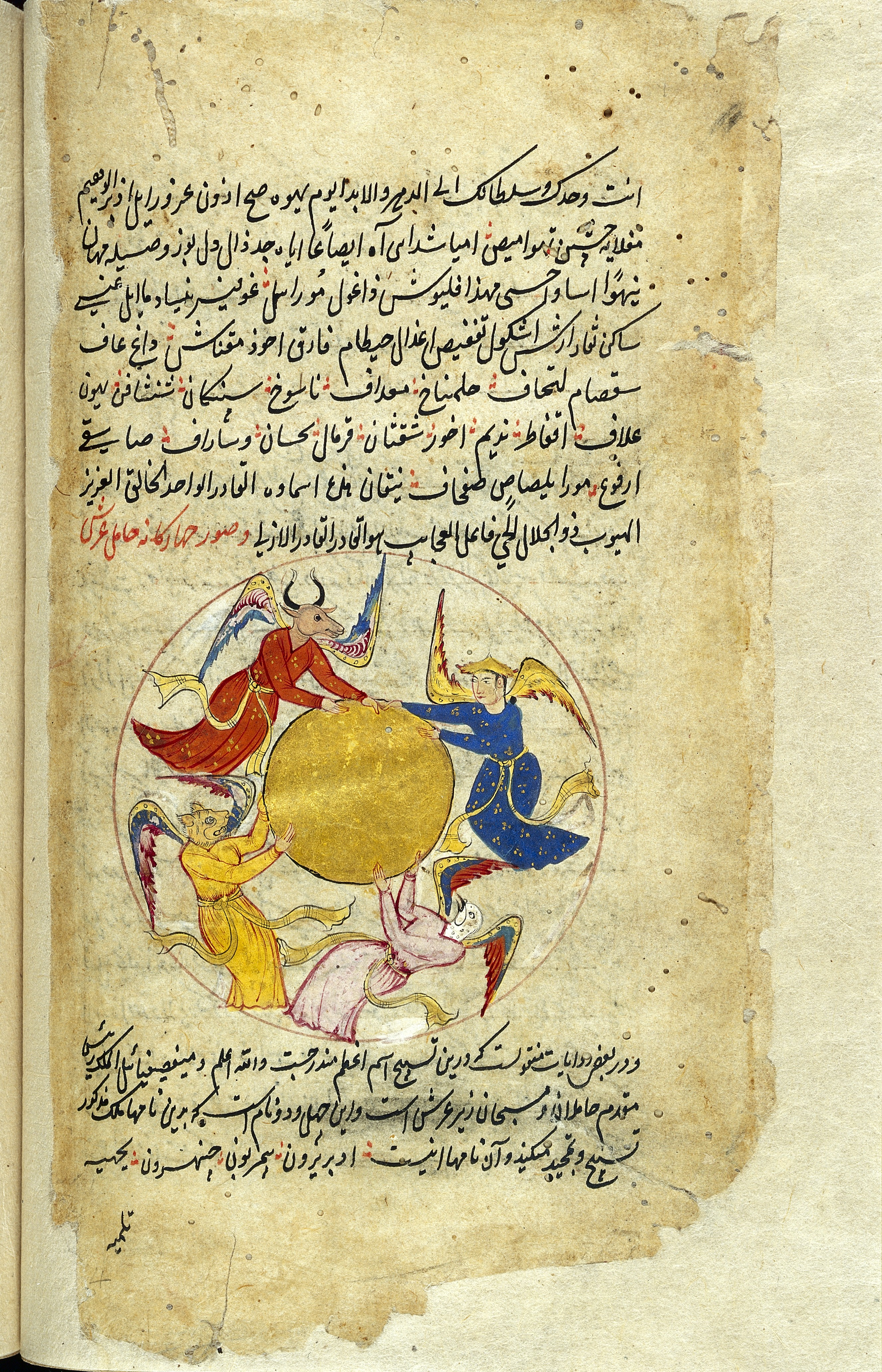
The four supporters (angels) of the celestial throne

In Islamic writings, seraphim are spelled as sarāfiyun (سرافيون). Seraphim are mentioned in a hadith from Al-Tirmidhi about a conversation between Muhammad and God, during the Night Journey, concerning what is between the Heavens and the Earth, often interpreted as a reference to the "Exalted assembly" disputing the creation of Adam in Surah Ṣād 38:69.

The Bearers of the Throne (ḥamlat al-arsh) are also comparable to seraphim, described with six wings and four faces according to tradition. No description of their features is given in the Quran, only that their number is eight in 69:17. In Islamic traditions, they are often portrayed in zoomorphic forms. They are described as resembling different creatures: An eagle, a bull, a lion and a human. Other hadiths describes them with six wings and four faces, while according to a hadith transmitted from At-Targhib wat-Tarhib authored by ʻAbd al-ʻAẓīm ibn ʻAbd al-Qawī al-Mundhirī, the bearers of the throne were angels who were shaped like a rooster, with their feet on the earth and their nape supporting the Throne of God in the highest sky. (Note: The hadith were: "...Allah, the most exalted, has permitted me to speak of a rooster whose legs have separated the earth, and its neck is bent under the throne..." through the narration of Abu Hurairah by Abd al-Qawi al-Mundhiri through Al-Qadi Abu Ya'la. The Hadith were judged as authentic and sound by numerous hadith scholars such as by Nur al-Din al-Haythami in his work, Majma al-Zawa'id, Al-Tabarani in his work, Al-Mu'jam al-Awsat, Mustafa al-Adawi in Sahih Al-Ahadith Al-Qudsi and also by Muhammad Nasiruddin al-Albani in his work Silsalat al-Hadith as-Sahihah It also commented as safe as it is also supported by other Hadith from another chain from Jabir ibn Abd Allah in the Sunan Abu Dawood.) A number of modern Islamic scholars from Imam Mohammad Ibn Saud Islamic University, and other institutes of Yemen and Mauritania also agreed on the soundness of this hadith by quoting the commentary from Ibn Abi al-Izz who supported this narrative.

Their affiliation is not always clear, and sometimes their role is swapped with the cherubim. In a book called Book of the Wonders of Creation and the peculiarities of Existing Things, these angels rank the highest, followed by the spirit, the archangels, and then the cherubim. The Bearers of the Throne are entrusted with continuously worshipping God. Unlike the messenger angels, they remain in the heavenly realm and do not enter the world.

Al-Razi identifies the seraphim with the angels around God's throne, next to the cherubim. They circulate the throne and keep praising God. Ibn Kathir, on the other hand, identifies the seraphim with those who carry the throne, the highest order of angels.

== In culture ==
=== Arts, entertainment, and media ===
- Multiocular O (ꙮ) is an exotic glyph variant of the Cyrillic letter O, containing 10 eyes, though certain fonts may incorrectly load the formerly-prescribed 7 eyes. This glyph variant can be found in a single manuscript in the Old Church Slavonic phrase "серафими многоꙮчитїи" (serafimi mnogoočitii, "many-eyed seraphim").
- In the video game Doom (2016), it is mentioned that a Seraph uses the Divinity Machine on the Doom Slayer, a device meant to bless him with great strength and speed in his fight against the Titan on Taras Nabad. In the sequel Doom Eternal, it is confirmed that the character Samuel Hayden is the Seraphim who blessed the Doom Slayer.
- In The Bastard Executioner, the Order of Seraphim are charged with preserving and protecting Jesus Christ's nine-volume, handwritten Libro Nazareni (New Testament) from the Church, which, as Annora and Ventrishire's manor priest, Father Ruskin, discuss in episodes 7 ("Behold the Lamb / Gweled yr Oen"), 8 ("Broken Things / Pethau Toredig"), and 9 ("The Bernadette Maneuver / Cynllwyn Bernadette"), could be toppled by the book's release to the public. For this reason, the Church's leaders, such as Robinus, the Archdeacon of Windsor, and their Knights of the Rosebud/Rosula, have targeted both the book and its protectors to be hunted and destroyed. In episode 3, some young Welsh people seeking to earn credibility with the rebels against the government unwisely masquerade as members of the Order of Seraphim by adorning themselves with seraphim face paint and attack the Baroness' wagon and its knights, which causes repercussions throughout the season for those captured, for their village, and for those affected by escalated hunts for rebels and for members of the Order of Seraphim.
- Seraphs appear in the American CW TV show Supernatural. They are depicted as being more powerful angels, but weaker than an Archangel. When the angel Castiel (originated from "Cassiel") dies, he is revived as a Seraph, but does not possess the power to go up against the archangel who killed him, Raphael.
- Seraph is a supporting character in the second and third films of The Matrix Trilogy. Seraph is an exile program who is seen acting as a "guardian angel" of the Oracle, and is described as the personification of a sophisticated challenge-handshake authentication protocol which guards the Oracle.
- Seraph is the name of the first Jewish superhero, who debuted in Super Friends # 7 by E. Nelson Bridwell, Ramona Fradon, and Bob Smith in 1977.
- In the adult animation show Hazbin Hotel, Sera, the head Seraph, and her younger sister Emily, a junior Seraph, are two supporting characters. Likewise, Charlie Morningstar's father, Lucifer, is said to be a fallen Seraph.
- In several titles in the Fire Emblem video game series, there is a damaging spell called Seraphim that is especially effective against monsters. It is often portrayed as being made of light and, sometimes, feathers.
- In the Sacred video game series, Seraphim are one of the playable classes.

=== Logos and mascots ===
- Several Catholic schools use a seraph or a seraph-related symbol as their mascot:
  - Koinonia Academy, Plainfield, New Jersey, United States
  - Mater Dei Catholic Preparatory School, Middletown, New Jersey, United States
  - St. Bonaventure High School, Ventura, California, United States
  - St. Madeleine Sophie Catholic School, Bellevue, Washington, United States
- Kingswood College in Randles Hill, Kandy, Sri Lanka, a public school, claims the seraph as its mascot.
- Both the University of Pisa and Sapienza University of Rome, Italy, feature a seraph as their logo.

== See also ==
- Bearers of the Throne – Group of angels in Islam
- Fiery flying serpent – Biblical creature
- Great chain of being – Medieval Christian hierarchy of living beings
- List of angels in theology
- List of hybrid creatures in folklore
- Rolls-Royce Silver Seraph
- Royal Order of the Seraphim – Swedish order of chivalry
- Serpent symbolism
- Serpents in the Bible
- Tetramorph – Symbolic arrangement of four differing elements
- Thrones – Class of angels
- Wepset – Ancient Egyptian deity
