= Al-Mu'jam al-Kabir (Al-Tabarani) =

Book by al-Ṭabarānī

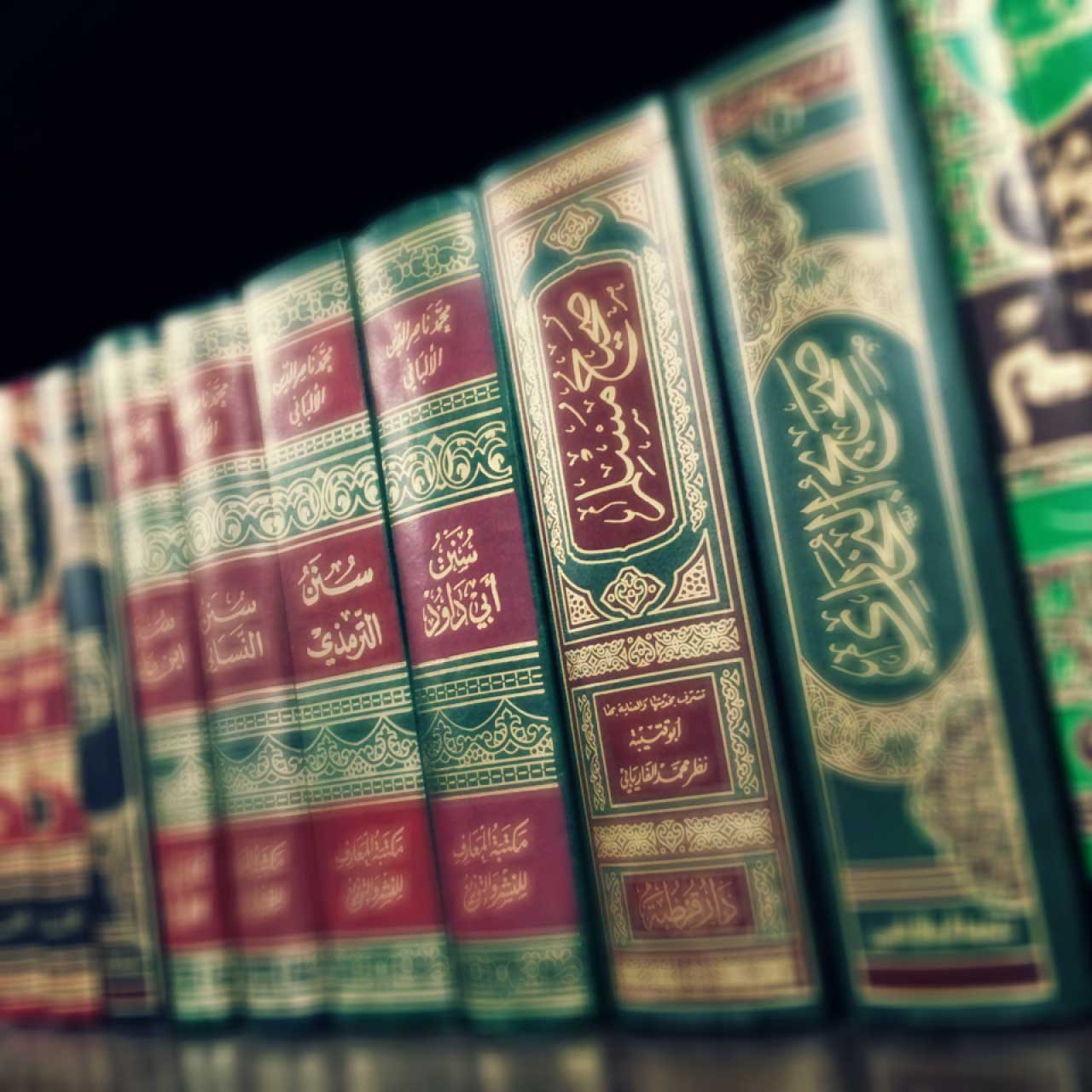
- Author: Al-Tabarani
- Original title: المعجم الكبير
- Language: Arabic
- Genre: Hadith collection

Al-Mu'jam al-Kabir (Arabic: المُعجَم الْكَبِير, romanized: Al-Muʿjam al-Kabīr) is a hadith collection compiled by al-Tabarani. It is part of his hadith book series by name of Mu'ajim Al-Tabarani. The other two books of the series are al-Mu'jam al-Awsat & al-Mu'jam as-Saghir.

== Description ==
It is one of the larger hadith collections, containing almost sixteen thousand (16000) hadiths according to Al-Maktaba Al-Shamela.

== Publications ==
The book has been published in various languages by many organizations around the world:

- Mujam al Kabir (11 vol) المعجم الكبير, Published: DKI, Beirut, 2007
- Mu‘jam al-kabīr (11 v.) by Ṭabarānī, Sulaymān ibn Aḥmad, Published: Bayrūt : Dār Iḥyā’ al-Turāth al-‘Arabī lil-Ṭibā‘ah wa-al-Nashr wa-al-Tawzī‘, 2009.
- Al-Mujam Al-Kabeer Arabic - Urdu (12 Volumes Full Set), Published: Non, Darussalam

== See also ==
- List of Sunni books
- Kutub al-Sittah
- Sahih Muslim
- Sahih al-Tirmidhi
- Sunan Abu Dawood
- Either: Sunan ibn Majah, Muwatta Malik
