= Al-Tabari (disambiguation) =

The name Tabari or al-Tabari means simply "from Tabaristan", an Iranian province corresponding to parts of modern Iranian province of Mazandaran.

It may also refer to:

== People ==
- Al-Tabari, Abu Ja'far Muhammad ibn Jarir al-Tabari (838–923), Persian historian and theologian (the most famous and widely influential person called al-Tabari)
- Omar Tiberiades (d. c. 815), Persian astrologer and architect
- Ali ibn Sahl Rabban al-Tabari, "Ali the scholar from Tabiristan" (838-870 AD) was the writer of a medical encyclopedia and the teacher of the scholar-physician Zakariya al-Razi
- Abul Hasan al-Tabari, 10th century Iranian physician
- Al-Tabarani, (c. 821-918 CE), recorder of numerous ahadeeth

== Places ==
- Rashid Pur Altabari, a village in Bihar, India.
