= Muhammad Kisoki =

- Sarkin Kano
- Reign: 1509 - 1565
- Predecessor: Abdullahi Dan Rumfa
- Successor: Yakufu Dan Kisoki
- Born: Muhammad Dan Abdullahi
- House: Bagauda Dynasty
- Father: Abdullahi Dan Rumfa
- Mother: Iya Lamis
- Religion: Islam

Muhammad Dan Abdullahi , known as Muhammad Kisoki, was the Sultan of Kano from 1509 until his death in 1565. His 56-year reign is the longest of the state's Rumfawa era.

Under his leadership, Kano reached the zenith of its influence, achieving full independence and gaining suzerainty over the Seven Hausa States. He also launched an expedition into Bornu and was able to decisively repel a reprisal attack by the Mai. In doing this, he dissolved the suzerainty that had been established decades earlier in the reign of Abdullahi Burja. He solidified his power in Kano by strategically promoting his kinsmen into powerful positions and was able to appropriate power from the Kano Council.

His reign also saw the continued influx of scholars from neighboring kingdoms and the construction of multiple mosques and schools throughout Kano, further establishing the state as a learning center.

Kisoki's death created a power vacuum that marked the beginning of the First Kanoan Civil War.

== Early life ==
Kisoki was the son of Sultan Abdullahi Dan Rumfa and Lamis. Kisoki was said to be present in his grandfathers court as a child and his precocious actions would earn Kisoki the admiration of the people who prayed that he would one day ascend the throne of Kano.

== Sultan ==
"Kisoki was an energetic Sarki, warlike and masterful. He ruled over all Hausaland East and West, North and South."

Muhammad Kisoki succeeded his father to become the 22nd ruler of Kano. His reign came during a period that saw internal strife ravage the Songhai and Bornu Empires, and the death of Kanta Kotal of Kebbi. Kisoki was eventually able to seize control of all the other Hausa states, resulting in the first Kano Empire. According to the Kano Chronicle, his rule encompassed all of Hausaland, the only instant in history when one Hausa State was able to gain dominion over all the others. Historians have noted that Kisoki had "the strong blood of his grandfather in his veins".

=== Kisoki's court ===
Though his grandfathers reign saw the introduction of strict "Kulle" (Purdah), Kisoki's court had a very strong female presence. Two of the most powerful figures in his court were his mother, Iya Lamis and grandmother, Madaki Auwa. Kisoki expelled Barde, a military captain, and installed his brother, Dabkare Dan Iya into the Kano Council of Nine. The title "Dan Iya" became the most revered in the state. His granduncle, Guli also became very powerful during his reign and the counselor's title "Na'Guli" was named after him.

=== Influx of Islamic scholars ===
During his era, a number of notable Islamic scholars came to Kano, bringing with them various Islamic books. Shehu Tunus brought Qadi Ayyad's al-Shifa with him. He urged the Sultan to build a mosque for the Rumfawa to which he obliged. Tubi came from Zazzau to learn from Tunus a year after he arrived and became his apprentice. Shehu Abdussalam also came from Bornu with the books al-Mudawwana, al-Mu'jam al-Saghir and the works of al-Samarqandi. Three siblings, Shehu Karaski, Magumi and Kabi also came from Bornu. The Sultan became close with Karaski and asked him to become his Alkali, but Karaski suggested his brother Magumi Instead. Magumi accepted the position and built a portico at Kofan Fada. Other notable scholars who came during his reign include, Dan-Goron-Duma, Zaite, Koda, Buduru and Tamma, father of one of Kisoki's wives, Hausatu.

=== Ali Fulan ===
The former grand vizier of the Songhai Empire under Askiya the Great, Ali Fulan while fleeing civil war also came to Kano intending to set out for Hajj but died in Kano.

=== Feud with Bornu ===
"Kisoki, physic of Bornu and the Chiratawa."

During the reign of Kisoki's father, Sultan Abdullahi, conflict arose between the Sultan and the Dagachi. The Dagachi is believed to be a relative of the Mai of Bornu through Othman Kalnama who had migrated to Kano and was the first to take the title "Dagachi (ruler)". Dagachi had become very wealthy and powerful in Kano and tried to usurp the Sultan in his absence but was quashed by the influence of the Sultans mother, Madaki Auwa. The Mai of Bornu came to attack Kano soon after. Kisoki's father, took a delegation of scholars to the Mai and humbled himself before the Mai to avoid a war. Sultan Abdullahi then stripped the Dagachi of his position, bestowing the title on one of his slaves.

Muhammad Kisoki, however, waged war on Birnin Unguru (a province of Bornu), presumably because of a feud about the trade routes through Gaidam. The Sultan entered the town and assembled its inhabitants at the city gates where he was said to "reduce them to terrified submission". He then told his army to leave the people unharmed but to seize the horses and textiles. After his campaign in Unguru, Sultan Kisoki retreated to the forest. The Mai sent a message to Kisoki to inquire what the purpose of his invasion was to which the Sultan replied; "I do not know, but the cause of war is the ordinance of Allah". The Sultan returned to Kano after one month.

A year later, the Mai came to attack Kano, but his siege was repelled and his army mortified. Kano's victory was well celebrated. The victory against Bornu was indicative of how powerful Kano had become.

M.G. Smith has theorized that Kano's invasion of Borno was in coordination with that of Kanta Kotal. With Kotal's death on the way back from Bornu and Kano's successful repulsion of the Mai's retaliatory attack, these events signaled a serendipitous change of fortune for the Sultanate which would not only assume total independence but significant influence over the region, hence the extended celebration after the Mai's defeat.

=== Family and marriages ===
The Kano Chronicle mentions two of Kisoki's sons who became rulers of Kano; Yakufu, son of Tunus, his immediate successor whose reign was ephemeral, and Muhammad Zaki, son of Hausatu.

=== Death and aftermath ===
Muhammad Kisoki died in 1565. His son Yakufu's accession was challenged by Guli, and a civil war broke out between Guli's faction and that of the Galadima, Sara Katunia, who was intent on returning Yakufu to the throne. The Galadima slew Guli after forty days of fighting but Yakufu abdicated his throne in favor of a life of piety. The civil war continued with the deposition and assassination of multiple subsequent kings until another one of Kisoki's sons, Muhammad Zaki, was installed in 1582.

== Biography in the Kano Chronicle ==
Below is a full biography of Muhammad Kisoki from Palmer's 1908 English translation of the Kano Chronicle.

The 22nd Sarki was Mohamma Kisoki. He was the son of Abdulahi and Lamis, who built a house at Bani-Buki and established a market there, and was the brother of Dabkare Dan Iya.

Kisoki put him in the “Kano nine,” and for that purpose expelled Berde. Kisoki was an energetic Sarki, warlike and masterful. He ruled over all Hausaland east and west, and south and north.

He waged war on Birnin Unguru because of Agaidam. When he entered the town, Sarkin Kano took his seat beneath the “kuka” tree, at the Kofan Pada, and assembling the inhabitants of the town at the Kofan Bai, reduced them to terrified submission. He gave orders that no men were to be made prisoners, but that only clothes and horses were to be taken.

Then he left Unguru and lived for a month in the bush. The Sarkin Bornu sent to him and said: “What do you mean by making war?”

Kisoki replied: “I do not know, but the cause of war is the ordinance of Allah.” The Sarkin Bornu said nothing more.

The men of Kano returned to Kano. In the next year the Sarkin Bornu came to attack Kano, but could not take the town and returned home.

Then Kisoki said to one of his men, Dunki, “Mount the wall, and sing a song in praise of the Sarki and his men of war.”

Dunki went. The song that he sung was this: “Kisoki, physic of Bornu, and the Chiratawa.” He sung it again and again, and after that he praised all those who were present at the fight; as Galadima Bawa, Mai-Dawakin Maisanda, Mai-Dawakin Gawo Magani, Dan Kudu Dufi Koamna, Makama Abdulahi, Makama Atuman, Dan Yerima Gajeren Damisa, Dan Buram Sagagi, Umoru Dan Maji, Dan Makoiyo Jigu, Dan Goriba Jar Garma, Dan Darmenkorau and Gaji Dan Bauni and many others, about forty in all. Dunki sang their praises for forty days on the top of the wall. After these he celebrated anyone else he thought worthy, as Madaki Koremma, Dagachi, Alkali Musa Gero, Sarkin Kasua, Liman Kano, Sarkin Bai, Dan Maji, Sarkin Yara, the eunuchs and San Turaki. The Madaki Auwa, because she was grandmother of Abdulahi, was also celebrated, in a song beginning:

Mother! Kano is your country.
Mother! Kano is your town.
Old lady with the swaggering gait,
old lady of royal blood,
guarded by men-at-arms.

Others there were too—34 in all. In Kisoki’s time Shehu Tunus, who brought Kshifa to Hausa, came to Kano. Dan-Goron-Duma also came, and Shehu Abclu Salam, who brought with him the books Maḍawwanna, Jam ‘as-saghir and Samarkandi. In the next year Tubi came from Zukzuk to learn from Shehu Tunus and became his chief disciple in Kano. Shehu Tunus told Kisoki to build a Friday Mosque for the Rumawa. Kisoki built it.

A certain mallam named Shehu Karaski, and Magumi and Kabi came from Bornu. They were brothers. Kisoki took a liking to Shehu Karaski and asked him to become Alkali. He refused, and suggested his brother Magumi. Magumi agreed, and built a portico at the Kofan Pada.

In Kisoki’s time, Zaite, Tamma, Buduru, and Koda came to Kano. Kisoki ruled the town with his mother Iya Lamis and his grandmother Madaki Auwa, and Guli, the brother of Madaki Auwa. Guli was much respected by the Sarki; he came to have power over the whole country. This is the reason every counsellor is called Na-Guli.

Kisoki ruled Kano 58 years.

— Kano Chronicle

Preceded by Abdullahi	Sarkin Kano; 1509-1565	Succeeded by Yakufu
