= Dauda Abasama =

Dauda Abasama may refer to the following people.

- Dauda Abasama I, a Hausa king (reign: 1565)
- Dauda Abasama II, a Hausa king (reign: 1776–1781)
