= Bab al-Asbat Cemetery =

Cemetery in Jerusalem

Bab al-Asbat (al-Yusufiyya) Cemetery
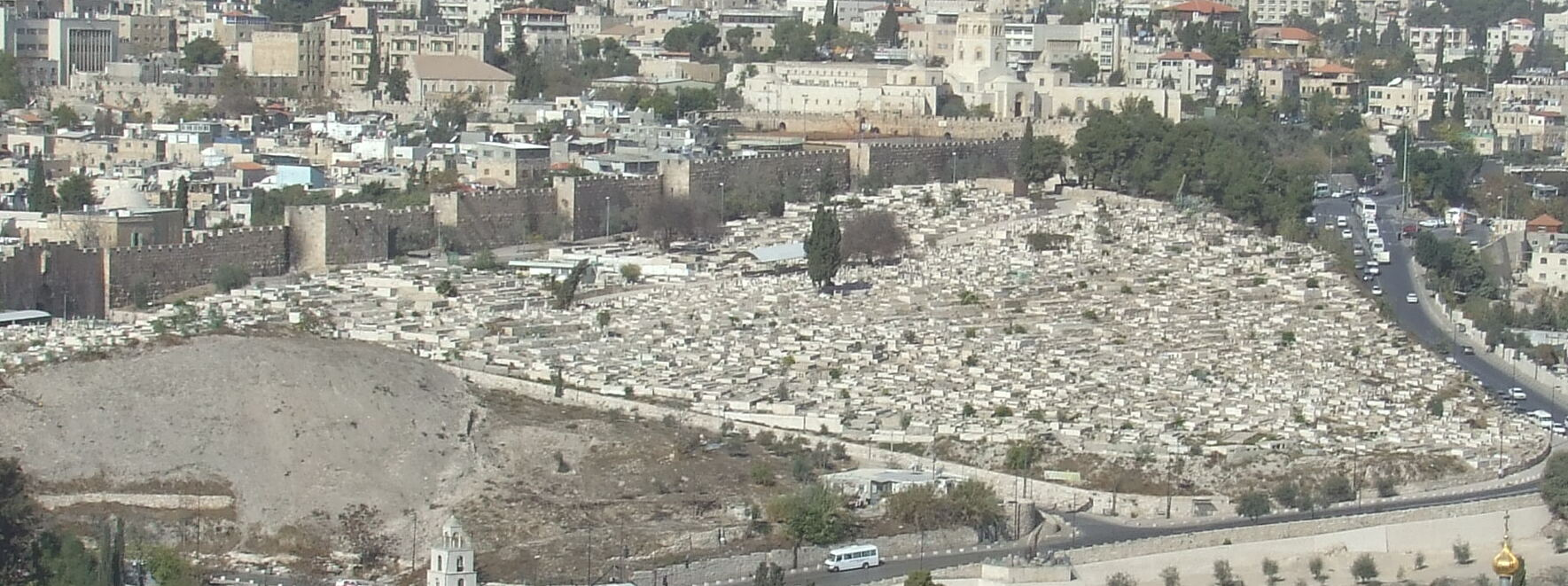
- Interactive map of Bab al-Asbat (al-Yusufiyya) Cemetery

Details
- Established: Ayyubid dynasty
- Location: Jerusalem
- Coordinates: 31°46′51″N 35°14′13″E

The Bab al-Asbat Cemetery, the al-Asbat Cemetery, also known as the al-Yusufiyya Cemetery, is an Islamic cemetery in Jerusalem, whose construction dates back to the era of the Ayyubid state.

== Location ==
It is north of (across a road from) Bab al-Rahma Cemetery. It is on a hill extending from the northern corner of Bab al-Asbat (the city gate, not the compound gate with the same Arabic name farther south), and from there to the east, by about 35–40 meters. Its borders meet with the main street called Jericho Road, which slopes south until it intersects with the road ascending to Bab al-Asbat. Thus, it has taken a wide area in the form of a trapezoid, widening in the south to reach a width of about 105 meters, and narrowing to the north. The Bab al-Asbat cemetery is not adjacent to the wall, unlike the Bab al-Rahma cemetery, where it is separated from the wall by a distance of 10–15 meters, and this distance is used as a path towards the Gate of the Lions. Some people confuse the Bab al-Asbat cemetery with Bab al-Rahma cemetery, as some think it is an extension of it.

It has two gates, the first in the north near the Friday market, which was a place for buying and selling sheep and other animals on Fridays. The other gate is in the south, where the two gates are linked by a white stone road about 4 meters wide, where the tomb is separated into two halves, west and east. The Israeli authorities have created a landfill in the area of the market.

== Controversies ==
Israeli settlers were accused of storming the cemetery and "performing Talmudic rituals" in May, 2021.

== See also ==
- Bab al-Sahira Cemetery
