= Abubakr Kado =

- Sarkin Kano
- Reign: 1565-1573
- Predecessor: Dauda Abasama I
- Successor: Muhammad Shashere
- House: Bagauda Dynasty
- Father: Muhammad Rimfa
- Mother: Auwa

Abubakr Kado was a Sultan of Kano who reigned from 1565 to 1573.

== Biography in the Kano Chronicle ==
Below is a biography of Abubakr Kado from Palmer's 1908 English translation of the Kano Chronicle.

The 25th Sarki was Abubakr Kado, son of Rimfa and full brother of Abdulahi. His mother’s name was Auwa. In his time the men of Katsina worsted the men of Kano until they came to the very gates of Kano.

They encamped at Salamta. The men of Kano went out to fight, but they were beaten and scattered, and had to take refuge in the town. Devastation went on, and the country was denuded of people. The only place where anybody was found was in walled towns or rocks, as Karayi, Gwan-gwam, Maska, Tariwa, or any other rocky place. Abubakr Kado did nothing but religious offices. He disdained the duties of Sarki. He and all his chiefs spent their time in prayer. In his time eunuchs and mallams became very numerous. Kano was filled with people. Mallam Sherif, Tamma, Gesu and Wuri came to Hausa from Lagoni. Some people say they came from Bagarmi.

Tamma was the greatest of them. When they first came they lived in Katsina land. For this reason the place where they lived is called Tamma. Afterwards they moved to Kano and settled at Godia. The town was called Godia after a certain woman, a harlot. She and the Sarki reigned jointly over the town. The Sarkin Godia said to Tamma, “Settle at Godia.”

So Tamma settled at Godia and married Godia, Abubakr was the first Sarki who read the book called Eshifa at the house of Ban Goronduma Kursiya. He was the Sarki who made the princes learn the Koran. This he did because of his own sons. They read the Koran well, and the reading was in the middle of Shaäban.

Every morning after sunrise the princes assembled. The Sarki came out after early morning prayer. He had 7 sons, each of which read a seventh of the Koran. He gave his sons great wealth. The eldest of them was Abdulahi, otherwise called Ban Kado Kisoki; Chiroma Yan Sarki was another; then Dauda Tsaga, Dan Ashia (Ashia was the Sarki’s sister), Dari, and Tella. The Sarki built Goron Pugachi for the reading of the Koran. He began reading Jam ‘as-saghir.

He ruled Kano 7 years and 6 months and then was deposed.

— Kano Chronicle

Preceded by Dauda Abasama I	Sarkin Kano; 1565-1573	Succeeded by Muhammad Shashere
