= Shaddad ibn Aws =

Companion of Islamic prophet Muhammad

Shaddad ibn Aws (d. 677/78) (Arabic: شداد بن أوس, romanized: Shaddād ibn Aws) was a companion of the Islamic prophet Muhammad, and a narrator of hadith. He is known for his narrations of hadiths regarding good deeds, morals and al-Sham. He is also known for his own statements which provide some guidance.

His grave is in the Bab al-Rahma Cemetery, Jerusalem, as is Ubadah ibn al-Samit's.

== Narrations ==
Some famous hadiths has been reported by him regarding good deeds, for example, Shaddad ibn Aws reported:

The Messenger of Allah said,

“A wise man is the one who calls himself to account (and refrains from doing evil deeds) and does noble deeds to benefit him after death; and the foolish person is the one who subdues himself to his temptations and desires and seeks from Allah the fulfillment of his vain desires”.

Likewise, he is also famous for reporting hadith regarding al-Sham, for example, Shaddad ibn Aws reported:

The Messenger of Allah said,

"Al-Sham will be conquered and al-Quds (Jerusalem) will be conquered, and you or your sons will be imams there, if Allah will".

— Tabarani
