= Siege of Laodicea (636) =

636 CE siege of Byzantine Syrian city by the Rashidun Caliphate

Coordinates: 35°31′0″N 35°47′0″E

- Part of the Muslim conquest of Syria (Arab–Byzantine wars)
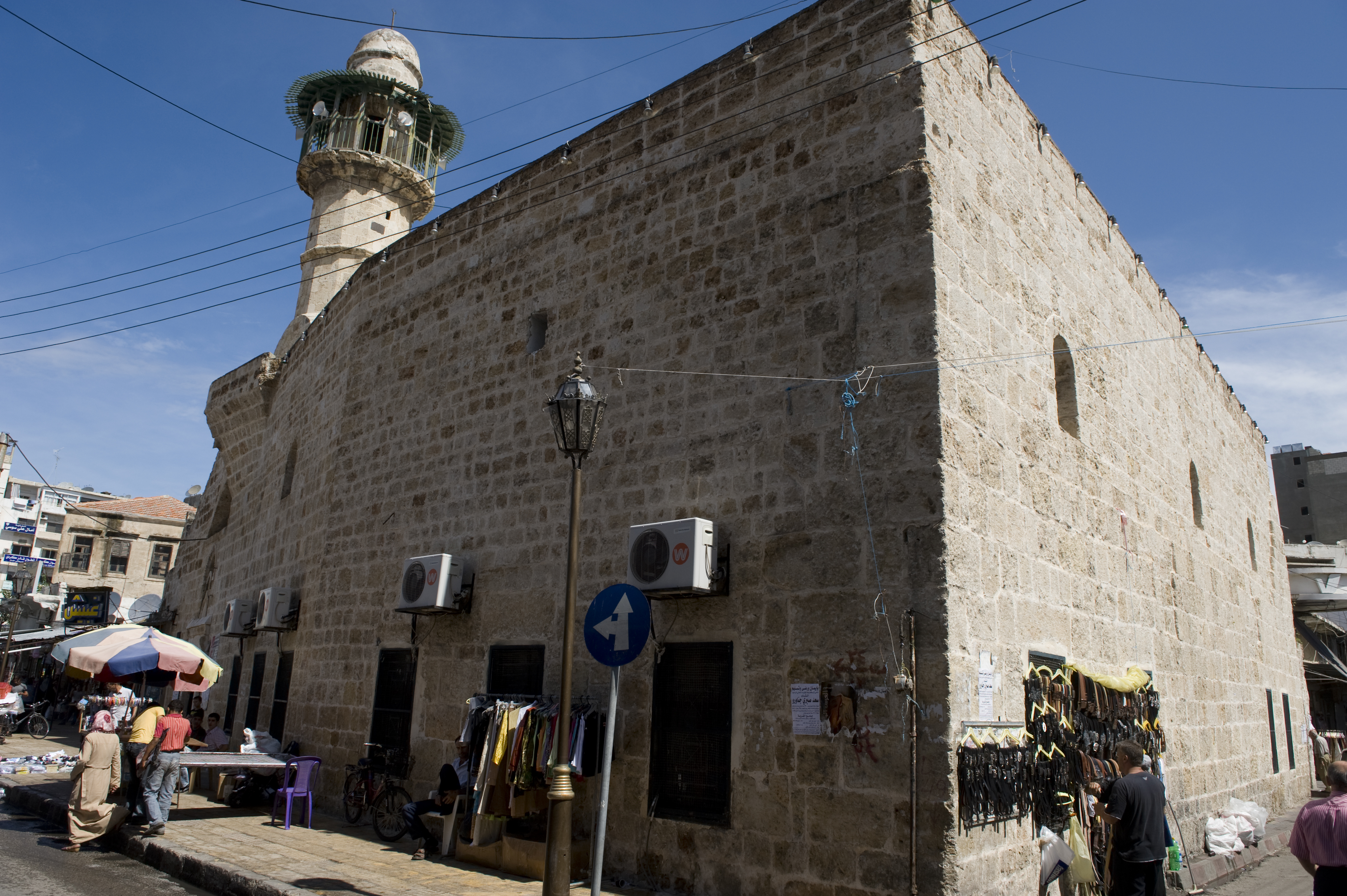
- Jami' al-Bazaar mosque in Latakia built by 'Ubadah ibn al-Samit during conquest of Levant
Date	636 AD
Location	Latakia, Syria
Result	Rashidun victory
Territorial changes	Laodicea annexed by calīphate

Belligerents
Byzantine Empire	Rashidun Caliphate

Commanders and leaders
Unknown	Abu Ubaydah ibn al-Jarrah 'Ubadah ibn al-Samit

The siege of Laodicea was a Rashidun Caliphate campaign that occurred in 636, during the Muslim conquest of the Levant. The siege of the Byzantine port city of Laodicea (modern Latakia) was led by Abu Ubaydah ibn al-Jarrah and 'Ubadah ibn al-Samit, two of the Companions of the Islamic prophet Muhammad.

== Background ==
After the city of Tartus was subdued in 636, 'Ubadah ibn al-Samit was immediately instructed by his superior, Abu 'Ubaydah to march towards Jablah and Latakia, then known as Laodicea.

== Siege ==
During the siege, 'Ubadah met stiff resistance from the local garrison. He saw that the city had a massive gate that could only be opened by many men. 'Ubadah then ordered them to camp at a distance from the city. They dug a trench deep enough to conceal his cavalry. 'Ubadah and his army pretended to return to Homs during the hours of daylight, but later that night he and his army silently returned and hide themselves within the trench.

Believing 'Ubadah and his men had gone, the citizens opened the city gate and drove forth their cattle. 'Ubadah immediately ordered his entire army to attack. The Byzantines, caught by surprise, were unable to close the gate again. 'Ubadah climbed upon the wall and shouted the takbir battle cry, whereupon his soldiers entered into the city. The terrified Byzantine defenders then fled towards Al-Yusaiyid, leaving the city undefended.

== Aftermath ==
The fleeing Byzantine soldiers and the local citizens surrendered to 'Ubadah, who allowed the population to return to their homes, on the condition that they paid the kharaj land tax.

Latakia was left largely intact by 'Ubadah, who supervised the building of mosques in the city, and stayed to impose Caliphate laws upon the population. He built the great mosque, Jami' al-Bazaar. Laodicea, the Greco-Roman name of the city, was changed to Latakia (Al-Ladhiqiyah).

== Sources ==
- al-Baladhuri, Ahmad ibn Yahya (1916). The origins of the Islamic state : being a translation from the Arabic. Vol. 1. New York: Columbia University. OCLC 848335318.
