= Muhammad Shashere =

- Sarkin Kano
- Reign: 1573-1582
- Predecessor: Abubakr Kado
- Successor: Muhammad Zaki
- House: Bagauda Dynasty
- Father: Yakufu
- Mother: Fasuma

Muhammad Shashere was a Sultan of Kano who reigned from 1573 to 1582.

== Biography in the Kano Chronicle ==
Below is a biography of Muhammad Shashere from Palmer's 1908 English translation of the Kano Chronicle.

The 26th Sarki was Mohamma Shashere, son of Yakufu. His mother’s name was Fasuma. He was unmatched for generosity among the Sarkis of Kano. He was the first to give a eunuch the title of Wombai (the eunuch was called Bamu). He also gave to a eunuch called Babba the title of Sarkin Bawaki. He gave to another eunuch called Mabaiyi the title of Bagachi.

He determined on an expedition against Katsina. He said to the Alkali Mohamma the son of Tanko, the son of Jibril, the son of Mugumi: “Find me an Alkali to take with me to war with Katsina. When I go to the war, I shall not return alive unless I beat the Katsinawa.”

The Alkali gave him his pupil Musa, whose mother’s name was Gero. The Sarki made Musa Alkali. Now when he came to Katsina, the men of Katsina came out to fight. The armies met at Kankia and fought there. The Katsinawa won because they were superior in numbers. The Kanawa ran away—deserting their Sarki—with the exception of San Turaki Mainya Narai, San Turaki Kuka Zuga and Ban Bumpki. Hence the songs “Narai the wall: ready to answer any challenge;” “Zuga does not run away.”

These returned home together with their Sarki and entered Kano with him. The Sarki was very grieved. His men said to him, “Lay aside your grief, next year we will defeat the Katsinawa, if Allah wills.”

But meantime his brothers were treacherously planning to kill him. San Turaki Narai heard of their plans, and told the Sarki, saying, “Bo not go outside your house, you or your Liman, to-day, or you will be killed.”

So the Sarki remained in his house, while San Turaki acted as Sarki. When the conspirators came in the evening, they found San Turaki with his slaves in the mosque, and, thinking he was the Sarki, attacked him. He had with him 9 of his own slaves, and eighteen of the Sarki’s household. The 9 slaves were killed. Twelve of the others were killed and six captured. The names of the 6 were Burimah, Jigo, Adam, Wukarka, Tukuki and Sarkin Wawayi. The new Sarki Mohamma Zaki intended to kill these 6, but they prayed and begged him saying: “Spare us and we will be your slaves, we are your grandchildren.” So the Sarki spared them, but each of them chose a task as a price of their lives.

San Turaki Narai was buried in the mosque in which he was killed. For this reason Mohamma Zaki made Aderki build Serikin Jarmai a house inside the Sarki's compound. The “zowre” of Turaki Mainya was also built near the mosque, as also Yan Sintali's house and the houses of Turaki Kuka and Mai-Shikashikai. The site of the mosque was changed. On account of this occurrence Turaki Mainya had the honour of acting for the Sarki, if he were absent, in the time of Mohamma Zaki, but afterwards the right lapsed.

Shashere ruled 9 years and 4 months and 24 days. Then he was deposed.

— Kano Chronicle

Preceded by Abubakr Kado	Sarkin Kano; 1573-1582	Succeeded by Muhammad Zaki
