= Yakufu =

- Sarkin Kano
- Reign: 1565
- Predecessor: Muhammad Kisoki
- Successor: Dauda Abasama I
- House: Bagauda Dynasty
- Father: Muhammad Kisoki
- Mother: Tunus

Yakufu was a Sultan of Kano who reigned in 1565.

== Biography in the Kano Chronicle ==
Below is a biography of Yakufu from Palmer's 1908 English translation of the Kano Chronicle.

The 23rd Sarki was Yakufu. His mother's name was Tunus.

He was Sarkin Kano 4 months and 20 days. Guli deposed him. The Galadiman Kano Sara Katunia and Guli carried on civil war. There was 40 days’ fighting in Kano before the Galadima overcame and killed Guli and determined to reestablish Yakufu on the throne. Yakufu refused, and returned among the learned men to study. So he went and lived in the country which bears the name of Yakufawa.

He was the father of Mohamma Shashere, Dauda Abasama, Sarkin Taura, Buduru, Sarkin Majia, Sarkin Gilima, Sarkin Kazura and Sarkin Gwunaka.

— Kano Chronicle

Preceded by Muhammad Kisoki	Sarkin Kano; 1565	Succeeded by Dauda Abasama I
