= Bab al-Sahira Cemetery =

Islamic cemetery in Jerusalem

- مقبرة باب الساهر
- Interactive map of Bab al-Sahira Cemetery

Details
- Location: Jerusalem
- Country: Israel/Palestine
- Coordinates: 31°46′58.8″N 35°14′1.5″E

Bāb as-Sāhira Cemetery or al-Sahira Cemetery an Islamic cemetery in Jerusalem, a few meters north of the city wall's Bāb as-Sāhira (al- or es-Sahira, Herod's Gate). It was previously called the Mujahideen Cemetery.

Along with Mamilla and Bāb ar-Raḥma Cemeteries, it includes graves for those in Saladin's army who died in battle (for al-fatḥ aṣ-Ṣalāḥī, 'the triumph of Saladdin').
