= Rashidpur Garhi =

- Census town
- Location in Uttar Pradesh, India Rashidpur Garhi (India)
- Coordinates: 29°23′16″N 78°09′38″E
- Country: India
- State: Uttar Pradesh
- District: Bijnor

Population (2001)
  - Total: 6,363

Languages
  - Official: Hindi, Urdu
- Time zone: UTC+5:30 (IST)
- Vehicle registration: UP
- Website: up.gov.in

Rashidpur Garhi is a census town in Bijnor district in the Indian state of Uttar Pradesh.

== Demographics ==
As of the 2001 Census of India, Rashidpur Garhi had a population of 6,363. Males constitute 54% of the population and females 46%. Rashidpur Garhi has a literacy rate of 75%, higher than the national average of 59.5%: male literacy is 81%, and female literacy is 68%. In Rashidpur Garhi, 12% of the population is under 6 years of age.
