= Bab al-Rahma Cemetery =

Islamic cemetery in Jerusalem

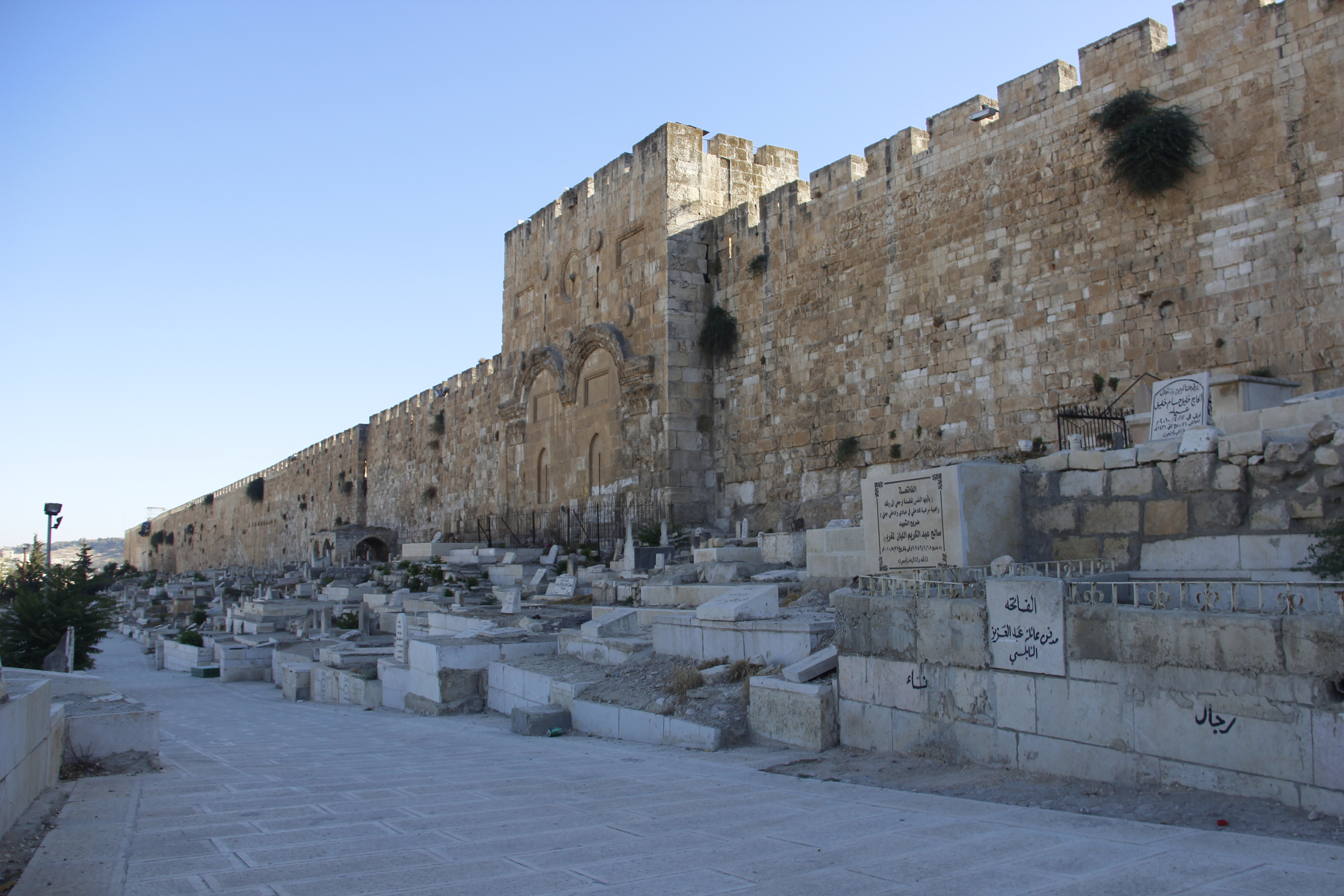
- Interactive map of Bab al-Rahma Cemetery

Details
- Location: Jerusalem
- Coordinates: 31°46′44″N 35°14′13″E

Bab al-Rahma cemetery, also known as Golden Gate Cemetery, is located along the outside of the eastern wall of Al Aqsa Mosque in Jerusalem. It extends from Bab Al-Asbat (Lions' Gate) to the end of the Al-Aqsa Mosque wall near the Umayyad palaces on the southern side. It has an area of about 23 acres. The Bab al-Rahma cemetery contains many graves of the Companions, most notably Ubadah ibn al-Samit and Shadad ibn Aus, and the graves of Mujahideen who participated in the conquest of Jerusalem during the Omari and Ayyubid conquests. The road to Lions' Gate separates the cemetery in two, Bab al-Rahma Cemetery to the south and Al-Asbat Gate Cemetery to the North.

Since at least 2011, Palestinian sources assert that the Israeli government intends to convert part of the cemetery into a biblical garden. According to Israel's courts and Nature and Parks Authority, work near the cemetery is minor and no displacement of graves is allowed.
