= Dauda Abasama I =

- Sarkin Kano
- Reign: 1565
- Predecessor: Yakufu
- Successor: Abubakr Kado
- House: Bagauda Dynasty
- Father: Yakufu
- Mother: Zuhara

Dauda Abasama I was a Sultan of Kano who reigned in 1565.

== Biography in the Kano Chronicle ==
Below is a biography of Dauda Abasama I from Palmer's 1908 English translation of the Kano Chronicle.

The 24th Sarki was Dauda Abasama. His mother’s name was Zuhara.

He ruled 1 month and 20 days before he was turned out. His brothers, Kazura, Majia, and his sister, Buduru, so called because she was unmarried, Gilima, Taura and Gwunka, the youngest, joined him in his exile at a place called Karmashe. Dauda settled there and a house was built for him. The brothers each chose a place to live.

— Kano Chronicle

Preceded by Yakufu	Sarkin Kano; 1565	Succeeded by Abubakr Kado
