= Al-Mu'jam al-Saghir =

Al-Mu'jam as-Saghir
- Author: Imam Al-Tabarani
- Original title: المعجم الصغير
- Language: Arabic
- Genre: Hadith collection

Al-Mu'jam as-Saghir (Arabic: المعجم الصغير), is one of the Hadith book written by great Hadith Narrator and compiler Imam Al-Tabarani (874–971 CE, 260–360 AH). It is part of his Hadith book series by name of Mu'ajim Al-Tabarani. The other two books of the series are Al-Mu'jam al-Awsat & Al-Mu'jam al-Kabeer.

== Description ==
This book contains almost 1200 hadiths according to Al-Maktaba Al-Shamela. It is the smallest book of Imam's Mu'jam Series. The book contains Sahih (authentic), Da'if (weak) and Maud'o (fabricated) narrations. The book is mostly famous among the scholars only. Ali ibn Abu Bakr al-Haythami has quoted Hadiths from Al-Mu'jam as-Saghir in his famous book Majma al-Zawa'id.

== Publications ==
The book has been published in various languages by many organizations around the world:

- Unwan al- unwan aw al-mu jam al-saghir, Published: Dar al-Kutub (2003)
- Mu‘jam al-ṣaghīr, Published: Jiddah : N.H.al-D.al-Barakātī, 2007.

== See also ==
- List of Sunni books
- Kutub al-Sittah
- Sahih Muslim
- Jami al-Tirmidhi
- Sunan Abu Dawood
- Jami' at-Tirmidhi
- Either: Sunan ibn Majah, Muwatta Malik
