= Al-Tabarani =

Muslim scholar and traditionist (c. 873–970)

Aṭ-Ṭabarānī ٱلطَّبَرَانِيّ

Personal life
- Born: 873/874 CE / 260 AH
- Died: 970/971 CE / 360 AH
- Era: Islamic Golden Age
- Main interest: Narrations
- Notable works: Al-Mu'jam al-Kabir; Al-Mu'jam al-Awsat; Al-Mu'jam as-Saghir
- Occupation: Scholar; traditionist

Religious life
- Religion: Islam
- Denomination: Sunni
- Jurisprudence: Shafi
- Creed: Athari

Muslim leader
- Influenced: Abu Nu'aym al-Bazzar

Abū al-Qāsim Sulaymān ibn Aḥmad ibn Ayyūb ibn Muṭayyir al-Lakhmī ash-Shāmī aṭ-Ṭabarānī (Arabic: أَبُو ٱلقَاسِم سُلَيْمَان بْن أَحْمَد بْن أَيُّوب بْن مُطَيِّر ٱللَّخْمِيّ ٱلشَّامِيّ ٱلطَّبَرَانِيّ) (873/874–970/971 CE/260–360 AH), commonly known as at-Tabarani (Arabic: ٱلطَّبَرَانِيّ, romanized: aṭ-Ṭabarānī), was a Sunni Muslim scholar and traditionist known for the extensive volumes of narrations he published.

== Biography ==
At-Tabarani was born in 260 AH in Tiberias, a city in Sham. He travelled extensively to numerous regions to quench his thirst of knowledge, including Syria, Hejaz, Yemen, Egypt, Baghdad, Kufa, Basra, and Isfahan. He narrated from more than one thousand scholars, and authored a multitude of books on the subject. Abu al-Abbas Ahmad ibn Mansur stated, "I have narrated 300,000 narrations from at-Tabarani." For most of the final years of his life, he lived in Isfahan, Iran, where he died on Dhu al-Qa'dah 27, 360 AH.

== Students ==
At-Tabarani, being a teacher of narrations, taught many students. Among them were Ahmad ibn Amr ibn Abd al-Khaliq al-Basri and Abu Bakr al-Bazzar.

== Works ==
At-Tabarani is primarily known for three works on narrations:

- Al-Mu'jam al-Kabir
- Al-Mu'jam al-Awsat
- Al-Mu'jam as-Saghir, which provides a narration from each of his masters
- Mukarramu al-Akhlaaq- a collection of ahadith revolving around beautiful and chivalrous character

== See also ==
- Al-Tabari (disambiguation)
- Majma al-Zawa'id
