= Rashid Pur Altabari =

Village in Kishanganj, Bihar, India

- Village
- Location in Bihar, India Rashid Pur Altabari (India)
- Coordinates: 26°14′11.1732″N 87°54′12.6252″E
- Country: India
- State: Bihar
- Division: Purnia
- District: Kishanganj

Languages
  - Local: Surjapuri, Urdu
- Time zone: UTC+5:30 (IST)
- ISO 3166 code: IN-BR
- Website: kishanganj.nic.in

Rashid Pur Altabari is a village in Bahadurganj, Kishanganj district, Bihar, India.

== Location ==
Rashid Pur Altabari is located on the Janta-Lohagara (T02) road. The village is about 20 km far from the district headquarter in north-west direction. The nearest city is Bahadurganj which is almost 13 km far. Bahadurganj is also block headquarter of the village. The village comes under Altabari panchayat.

== Notable residents ==
- Md Anwar Alam, director Darul Uloom Bahadurganj
