= Al-Mu'jam al-Awsat =

Hadith book by Al-Tabarani

- Author: Imam Al-Tabarani
- Original title: المعجم الأوسط للطبراني
- Language: Arabic
- Genre: Hadith collection

Al-Mu'jam al-Awsat (Arabic: المعجم الأوسط للطبراني), is one of the famous Hadith books written by great Hadith Narrator Imam Al-Tabarani (874–971 CE, 260–360 AH).

== Description ==
The book contains almost 9500 hadiths according to Al-Maktaba Al-Shamela. It is one of the major book of Hadith written by Imam Tabarani beside his other books. The book contains Sahih (authentic), Da'if (weak) and Maud'o (fabricated) narrations.

== Publications ==
The book has been published in various languages by many organizations around the world:

- al-Mu`jam al-awsat
- Mu'jam al-Awsat (7 vol) المعجم الأوسط للطبراني: Published: DKI, Beirut, 2012 (Beirut, Lebanon)
- Urdu: Al-Mujam Al-Awsat Arabic - Urdu (7 Volumes Full Set). By Imam Tabrani: Published: Non, Darussalam

== See also ==
- List of Sunni books
- Kutub al-Sittah
- Sahih Muslim
- Jami al-Tirmidhi
- Sunan Abu Dawood
- Jami' at-Tirmidhi
- Either: Sunan ibn Majah, Muwatta Malik
