= Al-Maktaba al-Shamela =

Arabic digital library

- Website type: Digital library
- Available in: Arabic
- Owner: Al-Maktaba Al-Shamela Foundation
- Website: shamela.ws
- Launched: April 2005

Al-Maktaba al-Shamela (Arabic: المكتبة الشاملة, romanized: al-Maktaba al-Shāmila, lit. 'The Comprehensive Library') or shortly Shamila Library is an Arabic digital library computer software and website which was first launched in April 2005. Users can read more than a hundred digitized books in the Arabic language. The digital library has also been made into applications for Android and iOS devices.

== History ==
The first version of Al-Maktaba Al-Shamela was released in April 2005 without the ability for users to upload digitized books to the library. It was formerly known as Al-Mawsu'at Al-Shamela (The Comprehensive Encyclopedia) and was created by a member of an online forum that was dedicated to members of the Ahl al-Hadith religious community. Then in January 2006, a new update was released allowing books to be deleted or added to libraries. In 2008, features were added for easier photocopying books to digital format.

The official website for Al-Maktaba Al-Shamela was launched in 2012, for users who intend on reading books without downloading anything to their devices. Around the same time, a mobile port was released for Android and iOS devices. The website received patronage from officials from the government of Riyadh in 2012 as well.

== Website features ==
The digitized books can be read and have excerpts copied from them online, without the need to download any additional software. The website also has a search function as well as listing by author of a specific book. The description of each book will also have a description of the author, publisher, location and year of publication, as well as an indicator whether the book's pages are in accordance with the original hardcopy version. For example, the manuscript of al-Iklil seen here has an indicator that the pages are in correct order but are not aligned the same way as the printed version; while the book al-Awa'il seen here has an indicator that page numbers are in order and correspond to the original printing of the book.

== Contents ==
All of the books in Al-Maktaba Al-Shamela are in the Arabic language. The main aim of the website was to provide researchers and students of knowledge with the resources they need for their own benefit. There are books about Islam as well as other books regarding Arabic culture, history, poetry and songs.

== See also ==
- IslamQA.info
