= Coyote Blue =

1994 novel by Christopher Moore

- First edition
- Author: Christopher Moore
- Cover artist: Ruth Marten
- Language: English
- Genre: Comic fantasy
- Publisher: Simon & Schuster
- Publication date: March 4, 1994
- Publication place: United States
- Media type: Print (hardback & paperback)
- Pages: 304
- ISBN: 0-06-073543-0
- OCLC: 56103620
- Preceded by: Practical Demonkeeping
- Followed by: Bloodsucking Fiends

Coyote Blue is a novel by American writer Christopher Moore, published in 1994. It has been widely reviewed.

The plot concerns a salesman in Santa Barbara, California, named Sam Hunter (a Crow Indian born Samson Hunts Alone) who, as a teenager, fled his home on the reservation when he was involved in the death of a law officer. The novel begins when the adult Sam has his life turned upside down by Coyote, the ancient Native American trickster-god.

One of the minor characters, "Minty Fresh" becomes an important feature of Moore's later work A Dirty Job.

In addition, Coyote Blue makes passing references to "Augustus Brine," from Moore's first novel, Practical Demonkeeping, and "Detective Sergeant Alphonso Rivera," from Practical Demonkeeping, Bloodsucking Fiends, A Dirty Job, You Suck: A Love Story, Bite Me, and Secondhand Souls.

Coyote also mentions having met Jesus Christ who was one of the main characters from Moore's novel Lamb: The Gospel According to Biff, Christ's Childhood Pal and made a minor appearance in Island of the Sequined Love Nun.
