= San Francisco in popular culture =

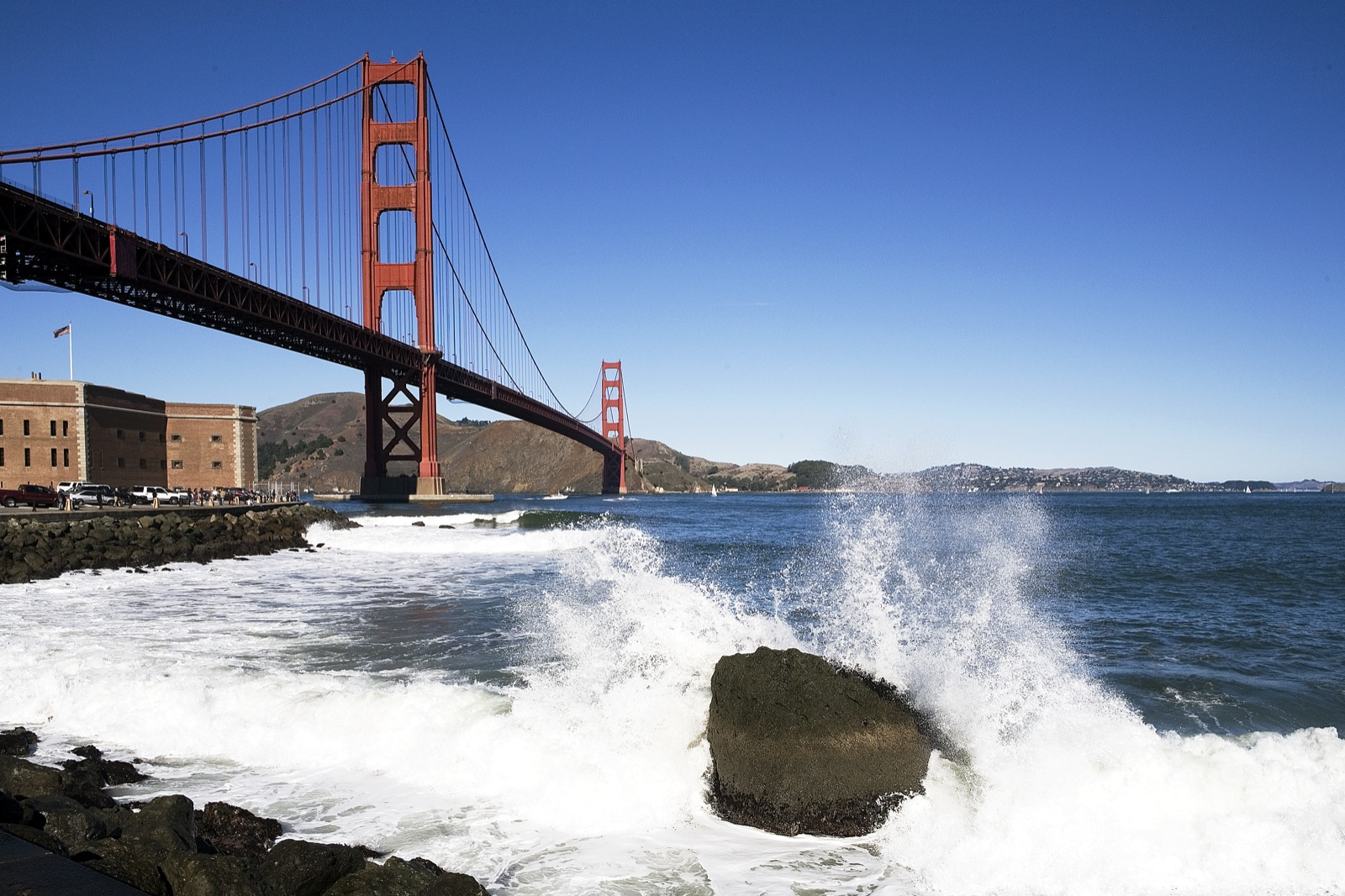
Fort Point by the Golden Gate Bridge where Hitchcock's Vertigo was filmed

Depictions of San Francisco in popular culture can be found in many different media. San Francisco is frequently used with its iconic landmarks such as the Golden Gate Bridge, Alcatraz and cable cars; social change of the Asian immigration, Summer of Love and the economic California Dream of the Gold Rush and Silicon Valley.

== Literature ==
San Francisco's diversity, eccentric characters, and geographic scenery have provided a backdrop for many works of fiction, including:

- 1906 by James Dalessandro
- Altered Carbon by Richard K. Morgan
- Angels in America by Tony Kushner – in the play and the 2003 television miniseries, Heaven was described as "like San Francisco."
- Around the World in Eighty Days by Jules Verne
- Bite Me: A Love Story by Christopher Moore
- Black Wind by F Paul Wilson
- Bloodsucking Fiends: A Love Story by Christopher Moore
- Bone by Fae Ng
- Bridge trilogy by William Gibson
- The City, Not Long After by Pat Murphy
- Confessions of a Catnip Junkie by Allan Goldstein
- The Confessions of Max Tivoli by Andrew Sean Greer
- The Crying of Lot 49 by Thomas Pynchon
- The Dharma Bums by Jack Kerouac
- Do Androids Dream of Electric Sheep by Philip K. Dick
- The Golden Gate by Vikram Seth
- Holy Fire by Bruce Sterling
- The Joy Luck Club by Amy Tan
- The Kite Runner by Khaled Hosseini
- Little Brother by Cory Doctorow
- Love Aaj Kal by Imtiaz Ali
- Maltese Falcon by Dashiell Hammett
- The Man in the High Castle by Philip K. Dick
- Martin Eden by Jack London
- McTeague by Frank Norris
- Mr. Penumbra's 24-Hour Bookstore by Robin Sloan
- Nightwood by Djuna Barnes
- On the Road by Jack Kerouac
- Our Lady of Darkness (vignette) by Fritz Leiber
- Postsingular by Rudy Rucker
- SoMa by Kemble Scott
- Tales of the City (series) by Armistead Maupin
- The Spellman Files series by Lisa Lutz
- The Time of Your Life by William Saroyan (play)
- Valencia by Michelle Tea
- A Visit From the Goon Squad by Jennifer Egan
- Women's Murder Club series (e.g., 11th Hour) by James Patterson and Maxine Paetro
- You Suck: A Love Story by Christopher Moore

=== Non-fiction ===
- The Electric Kool-Aid Acid Test by Tom Wolfe
- A Heartbreaking Work of Staggering Genius by Dave Eggers
- The Mayor of Castro Street by Randy Shilts

== Film ==
As in the case of fiction novels, San Francisco has served as a backdrop to a large number of films, some of which show the Golden Gate Bridge. Films set in the city include:

- 10.5 (2004)
- 40 Days and 40 Nights (2002)
- 48 Hrs. (1982)
- After the Thin Man (1936)
- All Dogs Go to Heaven 2 (1996)
- Always Be My Maybe (2019)
- Another 48 Hrs. (1990)
- Ant-Man (2015)
- Ant-Man And The Wasp (2018)
- Arachnophobia (1990)
- The Bachelor (1999)
- Barbary Coast (1935)
- Basic Instinct (1992)
- Beaches (1988)
- Beautiful Boy (2018 film) (2018)
- Bedazzled (2000)
- Bicentennial Man (1999)
- Big Eyes (2014)
- Big Hero 6 (2014)
- Big Trouble in Little China (1986)
- Birdman of Alcatraz (1962)
- The Birds (1963)
- Blue Jasmine (2013)
- The Book of Eli (2010)
- Born to Kill (1947)
- Boys and Girls (2000)
- Bullitt (1968)
- Bumblebee (2018)
- Burglar (1987)
- Cats & Dogs: The Revenge of Kitty Galore (2010)
- Cherish (2002)
- Cloud Atlas (2012)
- Contagion (2011)
- The Conversation (1974)
- Copycat (1995)
- The Core (2003)
- D.O.A. (1950)
- Dark Passage (1947)
- The Darwin Awards (2006)
- Dawn of the Planet of the Apes (2014)
- Days of Wine and Roses (1962)
- The Dead Pool (1988)
- Dirty Harry (1971)
- Dogfight (1991)
- Dopamine (2003)
- Double Harness (1933)
- Double Jeopardy (1999)
- Dragon Fight (1989)
- Dr. Dolittle (1998)
- Dr. Dolittle 2 (2001)
- EDtv (1999)
- The Enforcer (1976)
- Escape from Alcatraz (1979)
- Experiment in Terror (1962)
- Extraterrestrial (2014)
- Family Guy Presents: Stewie Griffin: The Untold Story (2005)
- The Fan (1996)
- Fearless (1993)
- Final Analysis (1992)
- The Five-Year Engagement (2012)
- Follow Me Home (1996)
- Foul Play (1978)
- Four Christmases (2008)
- Freebie and the Bean (1974)
- Funny People (2009)
- The Game (1997)
- A Gathering of Eagles (1963)
- Generation Now (2008)
- George of the Jungle (1997)
- Getting Even with Dad (1994)
- Godzilla (2014)
- Going the Distance (2010)
- Golden Gate (1994)
- Good Neighbor Sam (1964)
- The Graduate (1967)
- The Great Ziegfeld (1936)
- Greed (1924)
- Guess Who's Coming to Dinner (1967)
- Haiku Tunnel (2001)
- Hardcore (1979) - third and final city Scott's character travels to
- Harold and Maude (1971)
- Heart and Souls (1993)
- The Heartbreak Kid (2007)
- Herbie Rides Again (1974)
- Hereafter (2010)
- High Crimes (2002)
- Homeward Bound II: Lost in San Francisco (1996)
- House of Sand and Fog (2003)
- The House on Telegraph Hill (1951)
- How Stella Got Her Groove Back (1998)
- Hulk (2003)
- I Married a Communist (1949)
- I Remember Mama (1948)
- Impact (1949)
- The Impatient Years (1944)
- Innerspace (1987)
- Inside Out (2015)
- Interview with the Vampire (1994)
- Invasion of the Body Snatchers (1978)
- The Invisible Man (2020)
- The Invite (2026)
- It Came from Beneath the Sea (1955)
- Jagged Edge (1985)
- The Joy Luck Club (1993)
- Just Like Heaven (2005)
- Kuffs (1992)
- La Mission (2009) - starring Benjamin Bratt
- The Lady from Shanghai (1948)
- The Last Black Man in San Francisco (2019)
- The Laughing Policeman (1973)
- The Lineup (1958)
- The Love Bug (1968)
- Magnum Force (1973)
- The Maltese Falcon (1931)
- The Maltese Falcon (1941)
- The Matrix Resurrections (2021)
- Maxie (1985)
- Medicine for Melancholy (2008)
- Mega Shark vs. Giant Octopus (2009)
- Megamind (2010)
- Memoirs of an Invisible Man (1992)
- Meteor Storm (2010)
- Metro (1997)
- Milk (2008)
- Mission: Impossible – Ghost Protocol (2011)
- Monsters vs. Aliens (2009)
- More American Graffiti (1979)
- Mother (1996)
- Mrs. Doubtfire (1993)
- My Name Is Khan (2010)
- The Net (1995)
- Nine Months (1995)
- North Beach (2000)
- Old San Francisco (1926)
- The Other Sister (1999)
- Out of the Past (1947)
- Pacific Heights (1990)
- Pacific Rim (2013)
- Pal Joey (1957)
- Play It Again, Sam (1972)
- The Presidio (1988)
- The Princess Diaries (2001)
- Psych-Out (1968)
- The Pursuit of Happyness (2006)
- Quicksilver (1986)
- Race Street (1948)
- Rise of the Planet of the Apes (2011)
- The Rock (1996)
- Rollerball (2002)
- Romeo Must Die (2000)
- The Room (2003)
- San Andreas (2015)
- San Francisco (1936)
- Serendipity (2001)
- Shang-Chi and the Legend of the Ten Rings (2021)
- Sharknado: The 4th Awakens (2016)
- Shock (1946)
- Sister Act (1992)
- Sister Act 2: Back in the Habit (1993)
- The Sisters (1938)
- Skidoo (1968)
- Sneakers (1992)
- So I Married an Axe Murderer (1993)
- The Social Network (2010)
- Sonic the Hedgehog (2020)
- Star Trek (2009)
- Star Trek Into Darkness (2013)
- Star Trek IV: The Voyage Home (1986)
- Sucker Free City (2004)
- Sudden Fear (1952)
- Sudden Impact (1983)
- Superman (1978)
- Sweet November (2001)
- The Sweetest Thing (2002)
- Take the Money and Run (1969)
- Terminator Genisys (2015)
- Terminator Salvation (2009)
- Thieves' Highway (1949)
- Time After Time (1979)
- The Time of Your Life (1948)
- The Towering Inferno (1974)
- Twisted (2004)
- Una sull'altra (1969)
- Venom (2018)
- Venom: Let There Be Carnage (2021)
- Vertigo (1958)
- A View to a Kill (1985)
- The Wedding Planner (2001)
- What's Up, Doc? (1972)
- The Woman in Red (1984)
- Woman on the Run (1950)
- Woman on Top (2000)
- War (2007)
- X-Men: The Last Stand (2006)
- You Kill Me (2007)
- Yours, Mine and Ours (1968)
- Zodiac (2007)

== Documentary ==
- 24 Hours on Craigslist (2004)
- The Bridge (2006)
- Crumb (1994)
- Fog City Mavericks (2007)
- Jonestown (2006)
- Klunkerz: A Film About Mountain Bikes (2007)
- Straight Outta Hunters Point (2003)
- Thoth (2001)
- The Times of Harvey Milk (1984)
- Where Have All the Flowers Gone? (2008)
- The Wild Parrots of Telegraph Hill (2005)

== Television ==
Although the city is a frequent backdrop for many television shows, many 80s sitcoms set in San Francisco (such as Full House) were actually shot in studios in the Los Angeles area. Since the mid-90s, many productions supposedly set in the City by the Bay are actually filmed in Canada, most notably in Vancouver, a frequent double for the cities of San Francisco and Seattle on the small screen. Canadian provinces often offer attractive tax incentives and more flexible union regulations for production companies.

Monk was shot in Vancouver before moving to Los Angeles, and only a few exterior shots involving San Francisco landmarks are actually filmed in the city. Similarly, recent short-lived series such as Presidio Med, The Evidence or Killer Instinct were actually shot in the Los Angeles or Vancouver areas. The city of San Francisco has tried to counter this trend over the past few years by reducing filming fees and streamlining the permit approval process.

San Francisco is also a vital part of the Star Trek science fiction media franchise. It hosts the headquarters and council chambers of the United Federation of Planets, as well as its military/exploration arm, Starfleet. In addition, the Presidio hosts Starfleet's primary service academy, Starfleet Academy. A major Federation shipyard named after the city, site of the construction and refit of several starships named Enterprise, resides in geosynchronous orbit of Earth.

The TV shows Trauma, Midnight Caller, The Streets of San Francisco and Nash Bridges were filmed entirely in the San Francisco Bay area. The Nash Bridges Reboot pilot started shooting in 2021, 20 years after the final episode of the original series aired.

=== Fiction ===
Television programs that highlight the city and its people include:

- Accidentally on Purpose
- The Adventures of Brisco County, Jr.
- Alcatraz
- All Dogs Go to Heaven: The Series
- ANT Farm
- Big Hero 6: The Series
- The Californians
- Charmed
- Crazy Like a Fox
- Dharma & Greg
- The Division
- The Doris Day Show
- Eli Stone
- The Evidence
- Fairly Legal
- Falcon Crest
- First Years
- Full House
- Fuller House
- Girlboss
- Girls Club
- Half & Half
- Have Gun, Will Travel
- Hell on Wheels
- Hooperman
- Hotel
- Ironside
- Jackie Chan Adventures
- Journeyman
- Khan!
- Killer Instinct
- Kindred: The Embraced
- The Life and Times of Juniper Lee
- The Lineup (also known as San Francisco Beat)
- Looking
- Love Is a Many Splendored Thing
- Lucy, The Daughter of the Devil
- Mama
- The Man in the High Castle
- McMillan & Wife
- MDs
- Midnight Caller
- The Mighty B!
- Monk
- My Sister Sam
- Nash Bridges
- The Nine Lives of Chloe King
- The OA (part 2)
- Party of Five
- Pelswick
- Phyllis
- Poltergeist: The Legacy
- Presidio Med
- Robotboy
- San Francisco Beat
- Sense8
- Sledge Hammer!
- Sliders
- Star Trek: Deep Space Nine
- Star Trek: Enterprise
- Star Trek: The Next Generation
- Star Trek: Voyager
- The Streets of San Francisco
- Suddenly Susan
- That's So Raven
- Too Close for Comfort
- Touching Evil
- Trapper John, M.D.
- Trauma
- Twins
- We Bare Bears
- Wolf
- Women's Murder Club
- Young & Hungry
- Zoey's Extraordinary Playlist

=== Reality ===
- 30 Days
  - "Straight Man in a Gay World"
- Animal Cops: San Francisco
- Bait Car
- Color Splash
- Dirty Jobs
- The Hills
- Laguna Beach: The Real Orange County
- MythBusters
- Oddities: San Francisco
- Real World: Ex-Plosion
- The Real World: San Francisco
- Top Chef: San Francisco
- What Makes it Tick on Fine Living

=== Miniseries, specials or individual episodes ===
- Angels in America
- Doctor Who
- Criminal Minds: "The Fight"
- Family Guy: "Stewie Griffin: The Untold Story"
- Psych: "Who Ya Gonna Call?"
- The Simpsons: "Bart Mangled Banner", "I'm Spelling as Fast as I Can"
- South Park: "Smug Alert!"
- Tales of the City
- Warehouse 13: "Philosopher's Stone"
- Ben 10: "Framed"
- What's New, Scooby-Doo?: "The San Franpsycho"
- Xiaolin Showdown: "The Journey of a Thousand Miles"
- Transformers: The Headmasters: "Head On!! Fortress Maximus", "The Final Showdown on Earth (Part 2)"
- The Amazing Race: "Huger than Huge", "It's Just a Million Dollars, No Pressure"
- Danger Rangers: "Fires and Liars"
- Interview with the Vampire: “Don’t Be Afraid, Just Start the Tape”

== Video games ==
In the Carmen Sandiego computer games, the headquarters of the ACME Detective Agency is always located in San Francisco.

The Rush racing series is largely based in San Francisco, especially San Francisco Rush: Extreme Racing and Rush 2049.

In Sim City, there is a scenario re-creating the 1906 San Francisco earthquake.

San Francisco is the backdrop for all five Tex Murphy games by Access Software. The eponymous detective makes the POST WWIII city his home and his cases start there even if they don't ultimately come to resolution there. The games feature prominent S.F. landmarks such as The Golden Gate Bridge, Coit Tower, and Alcatraz. In The Pandora Directive, there are 3 paths the story takes: Mission Street – The High Moral Path; Boulevard of Broken Dreams – The Low Moral Path; and Lombard Street – The In between (or Back and Forth) Moral Path.

Manhunter 2: San Francisco from Sierra On-Line (1989) was set in San Francisco, and included visits to such local landmarks as Fisherman's Wharf and Alcatraz Island.

San Francisco is one of the key locations in Fallout 2.

San Francisco is a level in both Tony Hawk's Pro Skater and in Tony Hawk's Pro Skater 4.

It's one of the four playable cities in Driver and the main setting of Driver: San Francisco.

The City of San Fierro in Grand Theft Auto: San Andreas is largely based on San Francisco, though significantly smaller and with slightly more of a focus on Rural areas.

San Fierro features Rockstar's interpretations of the Haight-Ashbury district ("Hashbury"), the Castro district ("Queens"), Chinatown, and the Golden Gate Bridge ("Gant Bridge"), as well as the city's prominent cable cars and hilly terrain. Several other familiar landmarks have been recreated, from the Ferry Building and the Transamerica Pyramid ("Big Pointy Building") to Lombard Street ("Windy Windy Windy Windy Windy Street"), and Scottish landmarks such as the Forth Bridge and the Forth Road Bridge. There is a district known as "Garcia", a tribute to Grateful Dead frontman and San Francisco native Jerry Garcia, and San Fierro's City Hall closely resembles San Francisco's ornate City hall.

In Destroy All Humans! 2, the first level is in Bay City, a parody of San Francisco featuring the Coit Tower, Alcatraz (called 'The Rock') and Hashbury Street, as well as the Golden Gate Park.

Resistance 2 for the PlayStation 3 based its first level on the edge of San Francisco in an underwater secret base belonging to SRPA. A memorable moment was when Nathan Hale steps outside to see the Chimeran fleet hovering over a destroyed San Francisco with the Oakland Bay Bridge in flames.

Call of Duty: Black Ops II features the "Raid" multiplayer map in California, along with the zombies map "MOB of the Dead," set in and around the Alcatraz Prison, seemingly infested by the undead.

Call of Duty: Advanced Warfare features the Golden Gate Bridge in the mission "Collapse".

Mario Kart 8 for the Wii U features a race course named Toad Harbor, which is heavily based on San Francisco.

Watch Dogs 2 is based in San Francisco and the surrounding Bay Area.

In Sonic Adventure 2, the first level is City Escape, which is based on San Francisco. This level also reappears in Sonic Generations.

San Francisco is an explorable city in American Truck Simulator.

Mostly in ruins and barely recognizable, San Francisco is partially shown in Horizon: Forbidden West.

Asphalt Legends Unite features San Francisco as a playable race course.

San Francisco is featured as a city in The Crew and The Crew 2.

== Advertising ==
- Rice-A-Roni: The jingle touted the product as the "San Francisco treat".
- Levi Strauss & Co.: Stamps its buttons SF CA on its button-fly jeans. In 2005, they started to print "San Francisco" on the Dockers trademarked logo.
- IT'S-IT Ice Cream: Produced in San Francisco since 1928.
- Transamerica Corporation: Utilizes its prominent San Francisco building in its company logo.

== See also ==
- Alcatraz Island in popular culture
- Hollywood North
- List of appearances of the Golden Gate Bridge in popular culture
- List of San Francisco Bay Area writers
