= The Stupidest Angel =

2004 novel by American writer Christopher Moore

The Stupidest Angel: A Heartwarming Tale of Christmas Terror
- First edition cover
- Author: Christopher Moore
- Cover artist: Susan H. Choi
- Language: English
- Genre: Absurdist, Horror, Comic fantasy, Humor
- Publisher: William Morrow & Company
- Publication date: November 2004
- Publication place: United States
- Media type: Print (Hardcover)
- Pages: 288
- ISBN: 0-06-084235-0
- OCLC: 255636240
- Dewey Decimal: 813/.54 22
- LC Class: PS3563.O594 S78 2005
- Preceded by: Fluke, or, I Know Why the Winged Whale Sings
- Followed by: A Dirty Job

The Stupidest Angel: A Heartwarming Tale of Christmas Terror is a 2004 novel by American writer Christopher Moore. Set during Christmas, it brings together several favored characters from his previous books set in the fictional town of Pine Cove, a recurring location in Moore's novels.

An unabridged commercial compact disc recording of the original edition of The Stupidest Angel was issued with narration by Tony Roberts. In 2005 the novel won the Quill Award in the category of Science Fiction/Fantasy/Horror.

In 2005, Moore released The Stupidest Angel, Version 2.0, the text of which remains unchanged from that of the 2004 edition, with the addition of a short story at the end taking place one year after the events of the novel.

== Plot summary ==
An angel named Raziel (previously in Moore's novel Lamb) is sent to Earth to grant the wish of a child; he decides to help a boy who had witnessed the death of a man dressed as Santa Claus. Meanwhile, the town is preparing for a community dinner-gathering at the local church, near the cemetery. In his inept attempt to bring "Santa" back to life, the angel causes the townspeople to fall under siege by brain-hungry zombies who arise from their burial plots.

== Links to Moore's other works ==
The story takes place in Pine Cove, setting of Practical Demonkeeping and The Lust Lizard of Melancholy Cove. Tucker Case, helicopter pilot for the DEA, and his pet fruitbat, Roberto, appeared in Island of the Sequined Love Nun. The angel mentioned in the title, Raziel, appeared in Lamb. And Sam Applebaum mentions his rastafarian cousin Preston who lives in Maui, who was seen in Fluke and Bite Me: A Love Story.

The title is a play on the title of the 1946 book The Littlest Angel by Charles Tazewell, which has been adapted several times by Hollywood.

The main characters are: Theo Crowe, Molly Michion, Raziel, Lena Marquez, Tucker Case, Gabe Fenton, and Dale Pearson. Some of these characters are seen on other Christopher Moore(s) books.

== Reception ==
In The Guardian, Keith Brooke praised it as "[p]acy and engaging", and "crammed with sharp and funny one-liners", while Publishers Weekly called it "enough to make even the most cynical Scrooge guffaw."

At Tor.com, Mari Ness found it to "not be quite as heartwarming as its cover suggests, or, for that matter, as terrifying", but nonetheless recommended it as "an antidote to endless Christmas cheer."

== See also ==
- List of Christmas-themed literature
