= The Merchant of Venice =

Play by Shakespeare

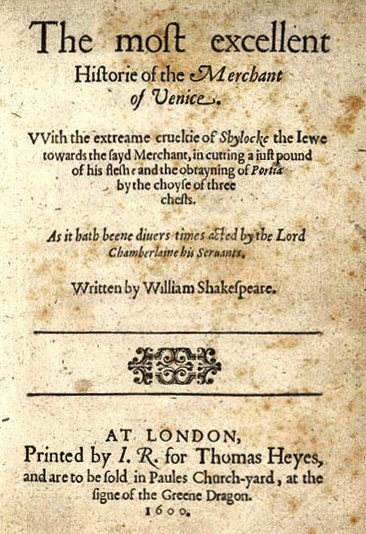
- Title page of the first quarto (1600)
- Original language: English
- Written by: William Shakespeare
- Characters: Antonio; Shylock; Portia; Bassanio; Jessica
- Series: First Folio
- Subject: Debt
- Genre: Shakespearean comedy
- Setting: Venice, 16th century

The Merchant of Venice is a play by William Shakespeare, believed to have been written between 1596 and 1598. A merchant in Venice named Antonio defaults on a large loan taken out on behalf of his dear friend, Bassanio, and provided by a Jewish moneylender, Shylock, with seemingly inevitable fatal consequences.

Although classified as a comedy in the First Folio and sharing certain aspects with Shakespeare's other romantic comedies, the play is most remembered for its dramatic scenes, and it is best known for the character Shylock and his famous demand for a "pound of flesh".

The play contains two famous speeches, that of Shylock, "Hath not a Jew eyes?" on the subject of humanity, and that of Portia on "the quality of mercy". Debate exists on whether the play is antisemitic, with Shylock's insistence on his legal right to the pound of flesh being in opposition to his seemingly universal plea for the rights of all people suffering discrimination.

== Characters ==
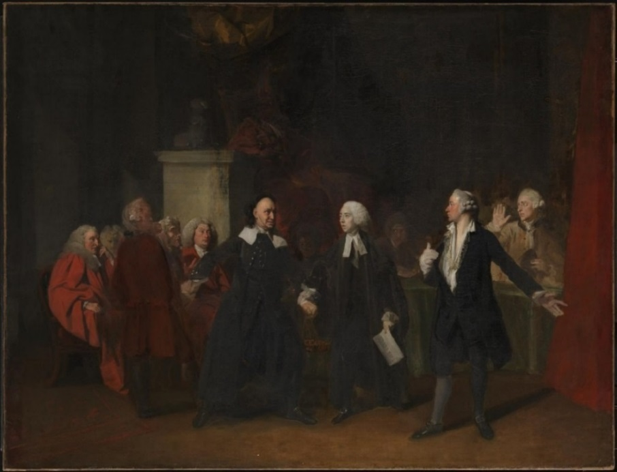
Charles Macklin as Shylock by Johan Zoffany, 1768

- Antonio – a prominent merchant of Venice in a melancholic mood and friend of Bassanio
- Bassanio – Antonio's close friend; suitor to Portia; later the husband of Portia
- Gratiano – friend of Antonio and Bassanio; in love with Nerissa; later the husband of Nerissa
- Lorenzo – friend of Antonio and Bassanio; in love with Jessica; later the husband of Jessica
- Portia – a rich heiress; later the wife of Bassanio
- Nerissa – Portia's waiting maid – in love with Gratiano; later the wife of Gratiano; disguises herself as Portia's clerk
- Balthazar – Portia's servant
- Stephano – Portia's servant
- Shylock – a Jew; moneylender; father of Jessica
- Jessica – daughter of Shylock, later the wife of Lorenzo
- Tubal – a Jew; friend of Shylock
- Launcelot Gobbo – servant of Shylock; later a servant of Bassanio; son of Old Gobbo
- Old Gobbo – blind father of Launcelot
- Leonardo – servant to Bassanio
- Duke of Venice – authority who presides over the case of Shylock's bond
- Prince of Morocco – suitor to Portia
- Prince of Arragon – suitor to Portia
- Salarino and Salanio – friends of Antonio and Bassanio
- Salerio – a messenger from Venice; friend of Antonio, Bassanio and others
- Magnificoes of Venice, officers of the Court of Justice, gaolers, servants to Portia, and other attendants
- Doctor Bellario, cousin of Portia, a character by reference who does not appear onstage

== Plot summary ==
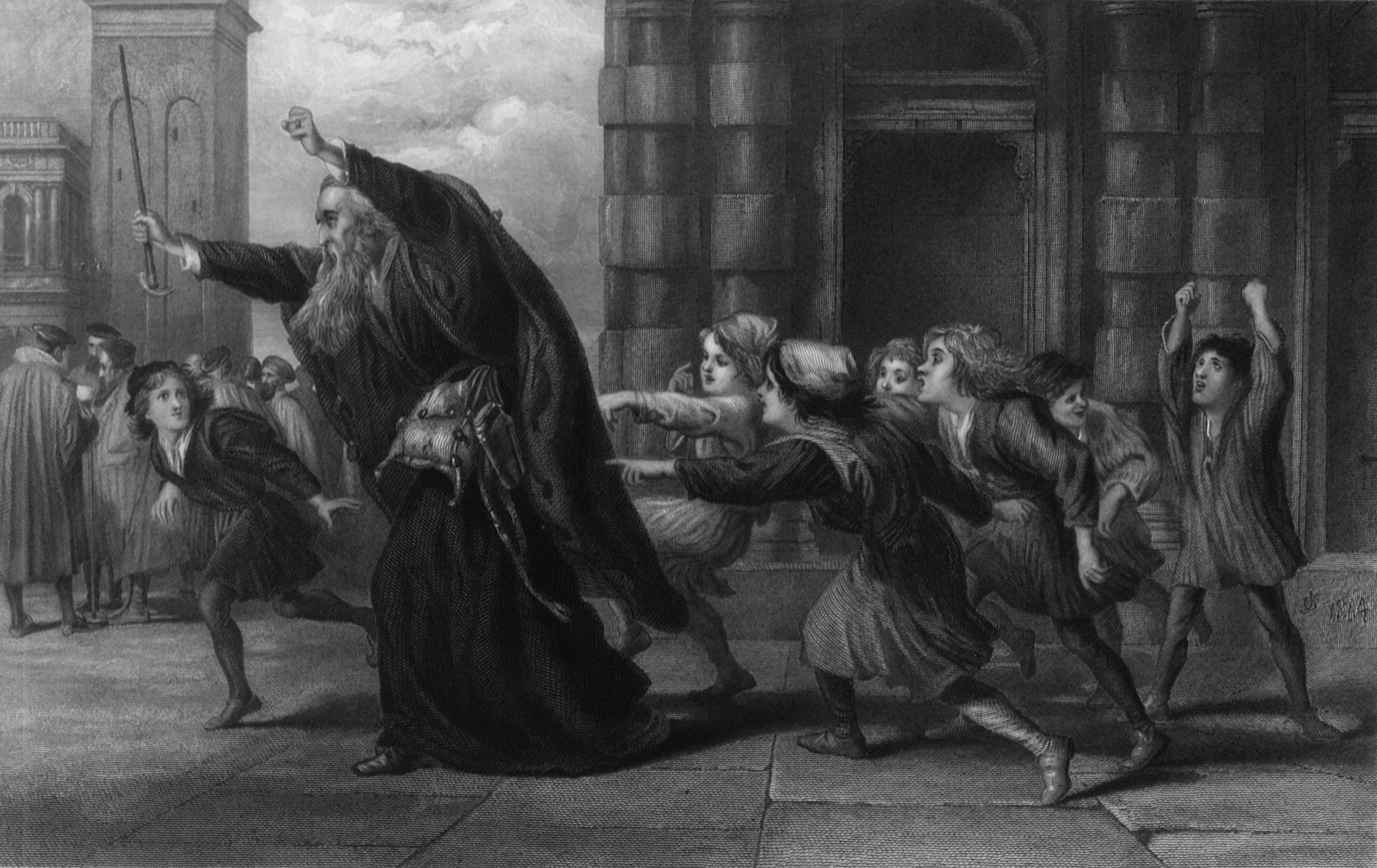
Gilbert's Shylock After the Trial, an illustration to The Merchant of Venice

Bassanio, a young Venetian of noble rank, wishes to woo the beautiful and wealthy heiress of Belmont, Portia. Having squandered his estate, he needs 3,000 ducats to subsidise his expenditures as a suitor. Bassanio approaches his friend Antonio, a wealthy merchant of Venice, who has previously and repeatedly bailed him out. Antonio agrees, but has no liquid cash as his ships and merchandise are busy at sea to Tripolis, the Indies, Mexico and England – he promises to cover a bond if Bassanio can find a lender, so Bassanio turns to the Jewish moneylender Shylock and names Antonio as the loan's guarantor.

Antonio has already antagonized Shylock through his outspoken antisemitism and because Antonio's habit of lending money without interest forces Shylock to charge lower rates. Shylock is at first reluctant to grant the loan, citing abuse he has suffered at Antonio's hand. He finally agrees to lend the sum to Bassanio without interest upon one condition: if Antonio were unable to repay it at the specified date, Shylock may take a pound of Antonio's flesh. Bassanio does not want Antonio to accept such a risky condition; Antonio is surprised by what he sees as the moneylender's generosity (no "usance" – interest – is asked for), and he signs the contract. With money in hand, Bassanio leaves for Belmont with his friend Gratiano, who has asked to accompany him. Gratiano is a likeable young man, but he is often flippant, overly talkative, and tactless. Bassanio warns his companion to exercise self-control, and the two leave for Belmont.

Bassanio chooses the lead casket and wins Portia's hand (The Merchant of Venice by Alexandre Cabanel, 1881)

Meanwhile, in Belmont, Portia is awash with suitors. Her father left a will stipulating that each of her suitors must choose correctly from one of three caskets, made of gold, silver and lead respectively. Whoever picks the right casket wins Portia's hand. The first suitor, the Prince of Morocco, chooses the gold casket, interpreting its slogan, "Who chooseth me shall gain what many men desire", as referring to Portia. The second suitor, the conceited Prince of Aragon, chooses the silver casket, which proclaims, "Who chooseth me shall get as much as he deserves", as he believes he is full of merit. Both suitors leave empty-handed, having rejected the lead casket because of the baseness of its material and the uninviting nature of its slogan, "Who chooseth me must give and hazard all he hath". The last suitor is Bassanio, whom Portia wishes to succeed, having met him before. As Bassanio ponders his choice, members of Portia's household sing a song that says that "fancy" (not true love) is "It is engendered in the eye, / With gazing fed"; Bassanio chooses the lead casket and wins Portia's hand.

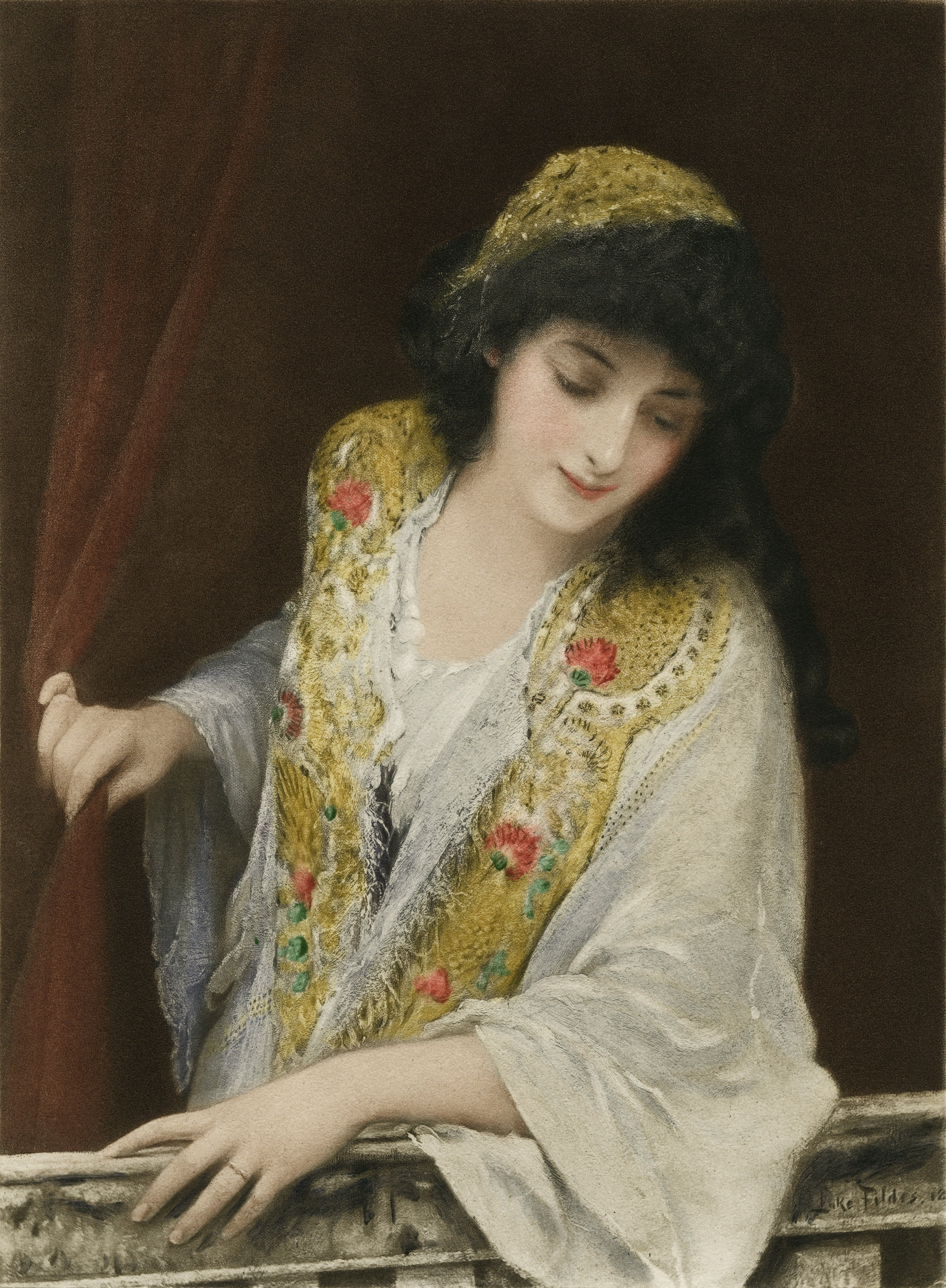
A depiction of Jessica, from The Graphic Gallery of Shakespeare's Heroines

At Venice, Antonio's ships are reported lost at sea, so the merchant cannot repay the bond. Shylock has become more determined to exact revenge from Christians because his daughter Jessica eloped with the Christian Lorenzo and converted. She took a substantial amount of Shylock's wealth with her, as well as a turquoise ring which Shylock had been given by his late wife, Leah. Shylock has Antonio brought before court.

At Belmont, Bassanio receives a letter telling him that Antonio has been unable to repay the loan from Shylock. Portia and Bassanio marry, as do Gratiano and Portia's handmaid Nerissa. Bassanio and Gratiano leave for Venice, with money from Portia, to save Antonio's life by offering the money to Shylock. Unknown to Bassanio and Gratiano, Portia sent her servant, Balthazar, to seek the counsel of Portia's cousin, Bellario, a lawyer, at Padua.

The climax of the play is set in the court of the Duke of Venice. Shylock refuses Bassanio's offer of 6,000 ducats, twice the amount of the loan. He demands his pound of flesh from Antonio. The Duke, wishing to save Antonio but unable to nullify a contract, refers the case to a visitor. He identifies himself as Balthazar, a young male "doctor of the law", bearing a letter of recommendation to the Duke from the learned lawyer Bellario. The doctor is Portia in disguise, and the law clerk who accompanies her is Nerissa, also disguised as a man. As Balthazar, Portia in a famous speech repeatedly asks Shylock to show mercy, advising him that mercy "is twice blest: / It blesseth him that gives and him that takes." However, Shylock adamantly refuses any compensations and insists on the pound of flesh.

As the court grants Shylock his bond and Antonio prepares for Shylock's knife, Portia deftly appropriates Shylock's argument for "specific performance". She says that the contract allows Shylock to remove only the flesh, not the blood, of Antonio. Thus, if Shylock were to shed any drop of Antonio's blood, his "lands and goods" would be forfeited under Venetian laws. She tells him that he must cut precisely one pound of flesh, no more, no less; she advises him that "if the scale do turn / But in the estimation of a hair, / Thou diest, and all thy goods are confiscate."

Defeated, Shylock consents to accept Bassanio's offer of money for the defaulted bond: first his offer to pay "the bond thrice", which Portia rebuffs, telling him to take his bond, and then merely the principal; but Portia also prevents him from doing this, on the ground that he has already refused it "in the open court". She cites a law under which Shylock, as a Jew and therefore an "alien", having attempted to take the life of a citizen, has forfeited his property, half to the government and half to Antonio, leaving his life at the mercy of the Duke. The Duke spares Shylock's life and says he may remit the forfeiture. Portia says the Duke may waive the state's share, but not Antonio's. Antonio says he is content that the state waive its claim to half Shylock's wealth if he can have his one-half share "in use" until Shylock's death, when the principal would be given to Lorenzo and Jessica. Antonio also asks that "for this favour" Shylock convert to Christianity and bequeath his entire estate to Lorenzo and Jessica. The Duke then threatens to recant his pardon of Shylock's life unless he accepts these conditions. Shylock, re-threatened with death, accepts with the words, "I am content."

Bassanio does not recognise his disguised wife, but offers to give a present to the supposed lawyer. First she declines, but after he insists, Portia requests his ring and Antonio's gloves. Antonio parts with his gloves without a second thought, but Bassanio gives the ring only after much persuasion from Antonio, as earlier in the play he promised his wife never to lose, sell or give it. Nerissa, as the lawyer's clerk, succeeds in likewise retrieving her ring from Gratiano, who does not see through her disguise.

At Belmont, Portia and Nerissa taunt and pretend to accuse their husbands before revealing they were really the lawyer and his clerk in disguise (V). After all the other characters make amends, Antonio learns from Portia that three of his ships were not stranded and have returned safely after all.

== Earlier sources ==
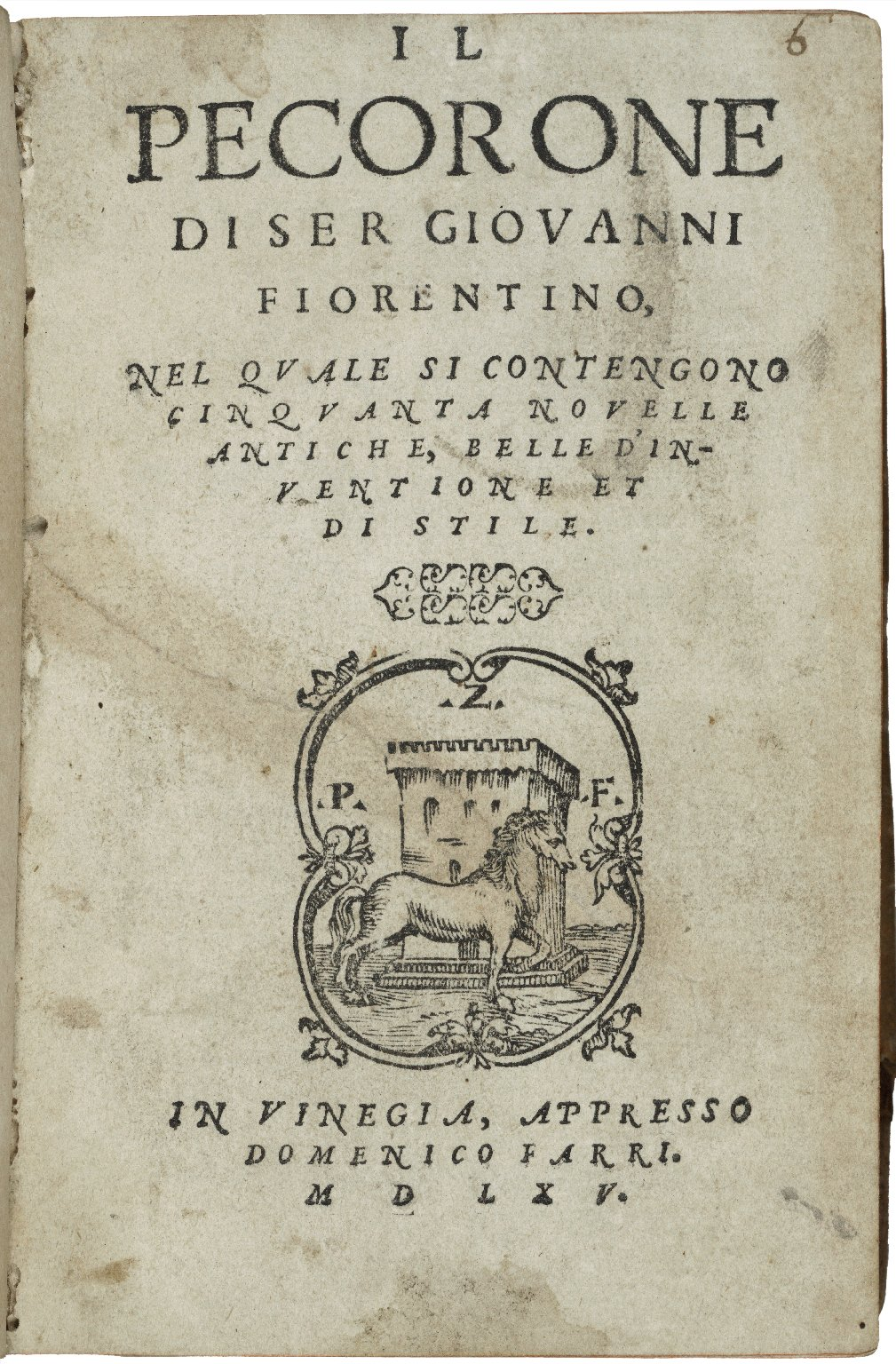
The title page from a 1565 printing of Giovanni Fiorentino's 14th-century tale Il Pecorone

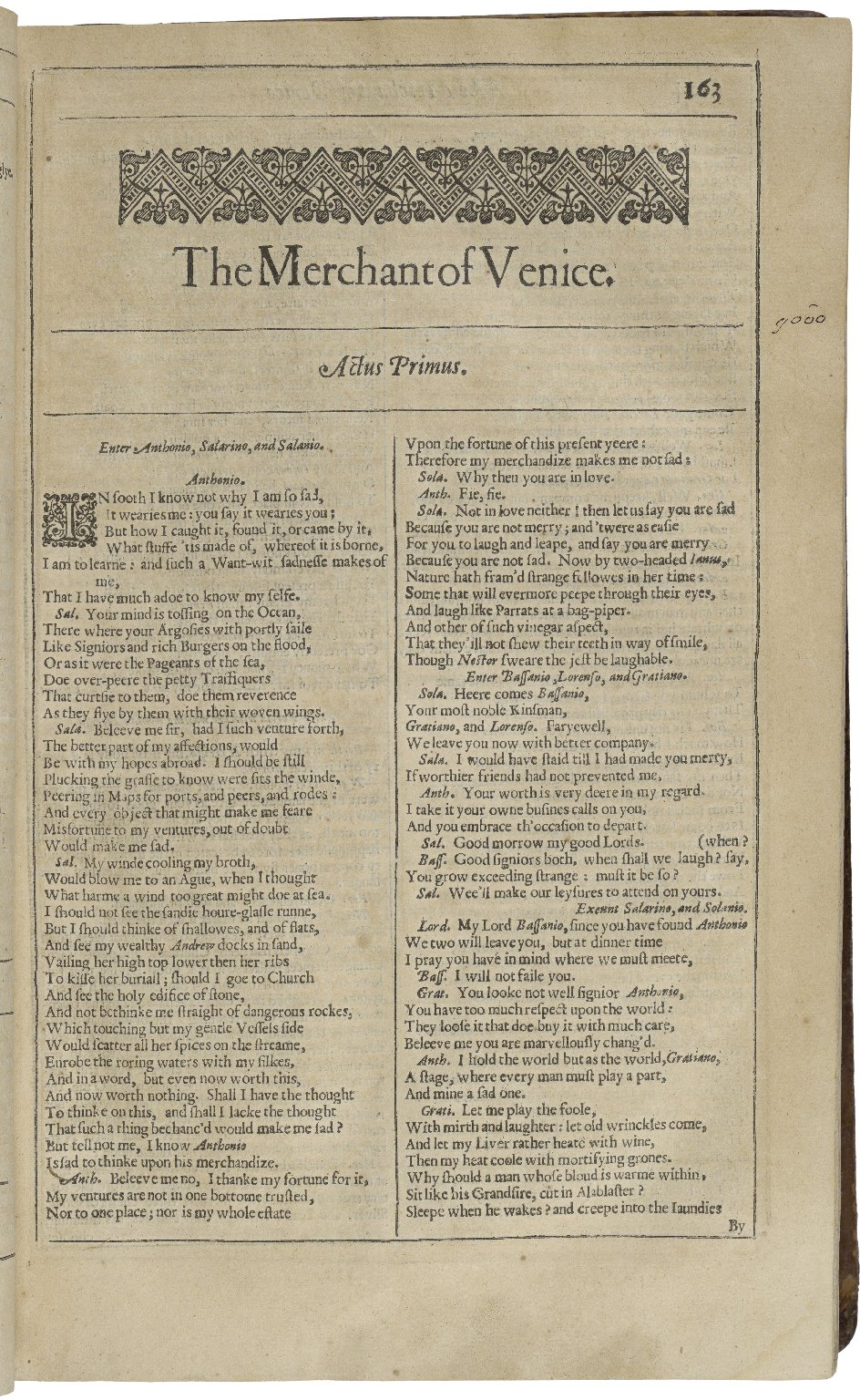
The first page of The Merchant of Venice, printed in the Second Folio of 1632

The forfeit of a merchant's deadly bond after standing surety for a friend's loan was a common tale in England in the late 16th century. In addition, the test of the suitors at Belmont, the merchant's rescue from the "pound of flesh" penalty by his friend's new wife disguised as a lawyer, and her demand for the betrothal ring in payment are all elements present in the 14th-century tale Il Pecorone by Giovanni Fiorentino, which was published in Milan in 1558. Elements of the trial scene are also found in The Orator by Alexandre Sylvane, published in translation in 1596. The story of the three caskets can be found in Gesta Romanorum, a collection of tales probably compiled at the end of the 13th century.

== Date and text ==
The date of composition of The Merchant of Venice is believed to be between 1596 and 1598. The play was mentioned by Francis Meres in 1598, so it must have been familiar on the stage by that date. The title page of the first edition in 1600 states that it had been performed "divers times" by that date. Salerino's reference to the ship the Andrew (I, i, 27) is thought to be an allusion to the Spanish ship St. Andrew, captured by the English at Cádiz in 1596. A date of 1596–97 is considered consistent with the play's style.

The play was entered in the Register of the Stationers Company, the method at that time of obtaining copyright for a new play, by James Roberts on 22 July 1598 under the title "the Marchaunt of Venyce or otherwise called the Jewe of Venyce." On 28 October 1600 Roberts transferred his right to the play to the stationer Thomas Heyes; Heyes published the first quarto before the end of the year. It was printed again in 1619, as part of William Jaggard's so-called False Folio. (Later, Thomas Heyes' son and heir Laurence Heyes asked for and was granted a confirmation of his right to the play, on 8 July 1619.) The 1600 edition is generally regarded as being accurate and reliable. It is the basis of the text published in the 1623 First Folio, which adds a number of stage directions, mainly musical cues.

== Themes ==
=== Shylock and the antisemitism debate ===
The play is frequently staged, but is potentially troubling to modern audiences because of its central themes, which can easily appear antisemitic. Modern critics argue over the play's stance on the Jews and Judaism. American literary critic Harold Bloom argued in 1998 that "one would have to be blind, deaf and dumb not to recognise that Shakespeare's grand, equivocal comedy The Merchant of Venice is nevertheless a profoundly anti-semitic work".

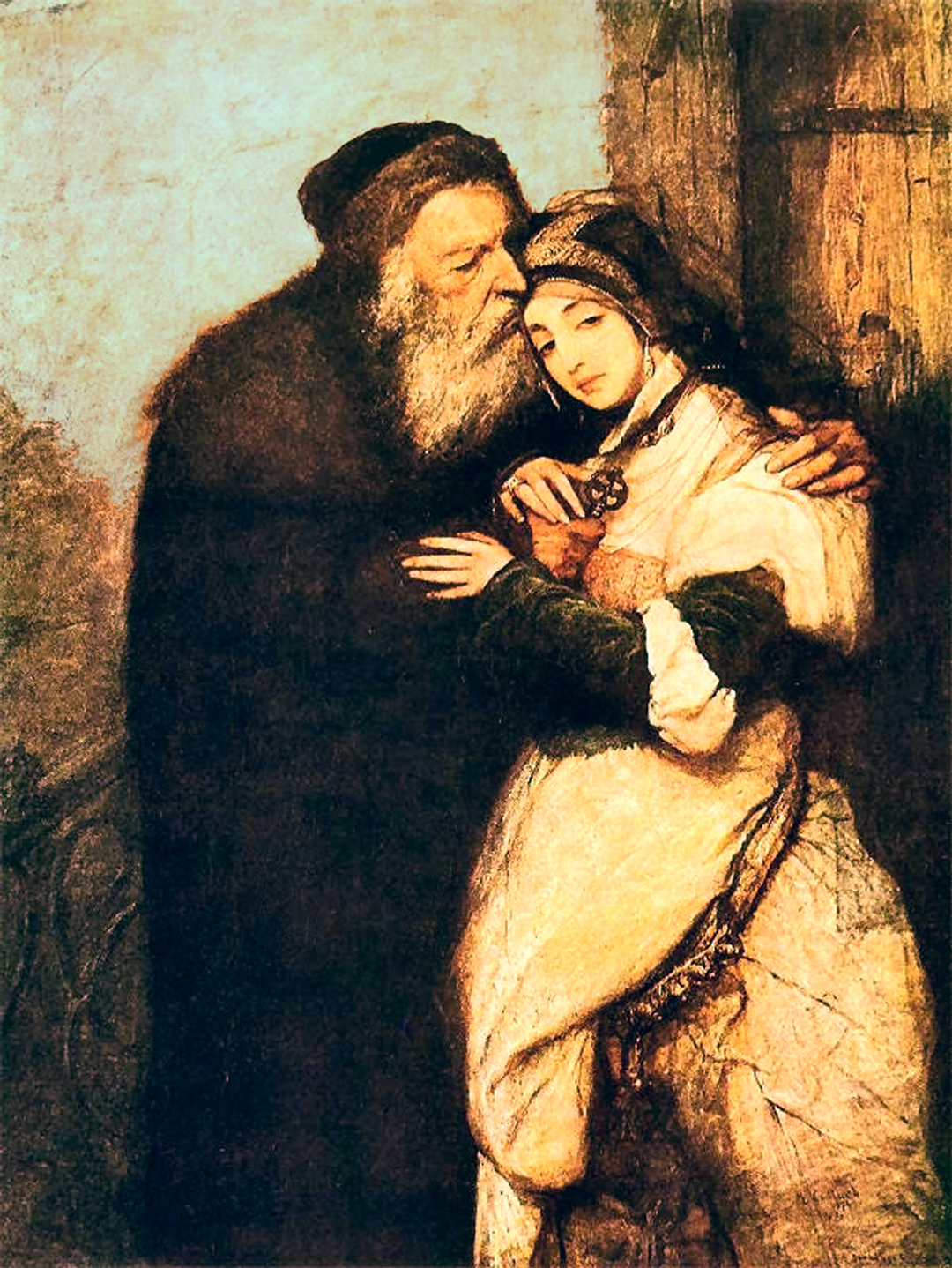
Shylock and Jessica (1876) by Maurycy Gottlieb

==== Shylock as an antagonist ====
English society in the Elizabethan and Jacobean era has been described as "judeophobic". English Jews had been expelled under Edward I in 1290 and were not permitted to return until 1656 under the rule of Oliver Cromwell. Poet John Donne, who was Dean of St Paul's Cathedral and a contemporary of Shakespeare, gave a sermon in 1624 perpetuating the Blood Libel – the entirely unsubstantiated antisemitic lie that Jews ritually murdered Christians to drink their blood and achieve salvation. In Venice and in some other places, Jews were required to wear a yellow or red hat at all times in public to make sure that they were easily identified, and had to live in a ghetto.

Shakespeare's play may be seen as a continuation of this tradition. The title page of the Quarto indicates that the play was sometimes known as The Jew of Venice in its day, which suggests that it was seen as similar to Marlowe's early 1590s work The Jew of Malta. One interpretation of the play's structure is that Shakespeare meant to contrast the perceived mercy of the main Christian characters while giving the Jewish character vengeful characteristics. Similarly, it is possible that Shakespeare meant Shylock's forced conversion to Christianity to be a "happy ending" for the character, as, to some Christian audiences, it saves his soul and allows him to enter Heaven.

Regardless of what Shakespeare's authorial intent may have been, the play has been made use of by antisemites throughout the play's history. The Nazis used the usurious Shylock for their propaganda. Shortly after Kristallnacht in 1938, The Merchant of Venice was broadcast for propagandistic ends over the German airwaves. Productions of the play followed in Lübeck (1938), Berlin (1940), and elsewhere within the Nazi territory.

In a series of articles called Observer, first published in 1785, British playwright Richard Cumberland created a character named Abraham Abrahams, who is quoted as saying, "I verily believe the odious character of Shylock has brought little less persecution upon us, poor scattered sons of Abraham, than the Inquisition itself." Cumberland later wrote a successful play, The Jew (1794), in which his title character, Sheva, is portrayed sympathetically, as both a kindhearted and generous man. This was the first known attempt by a dramatist to reverse the negative stereotype that Shylock personified.

The depiction of Jews in literature throughout the centuries bears the close imprint of Shylock. With slight variations much of English literature up until the 20th century depicts the Jew as "a monied, cruel, lecherous, avaricious outsider tolerated only because of his golden hoard".

==== Shylock as a sympathetic character ====
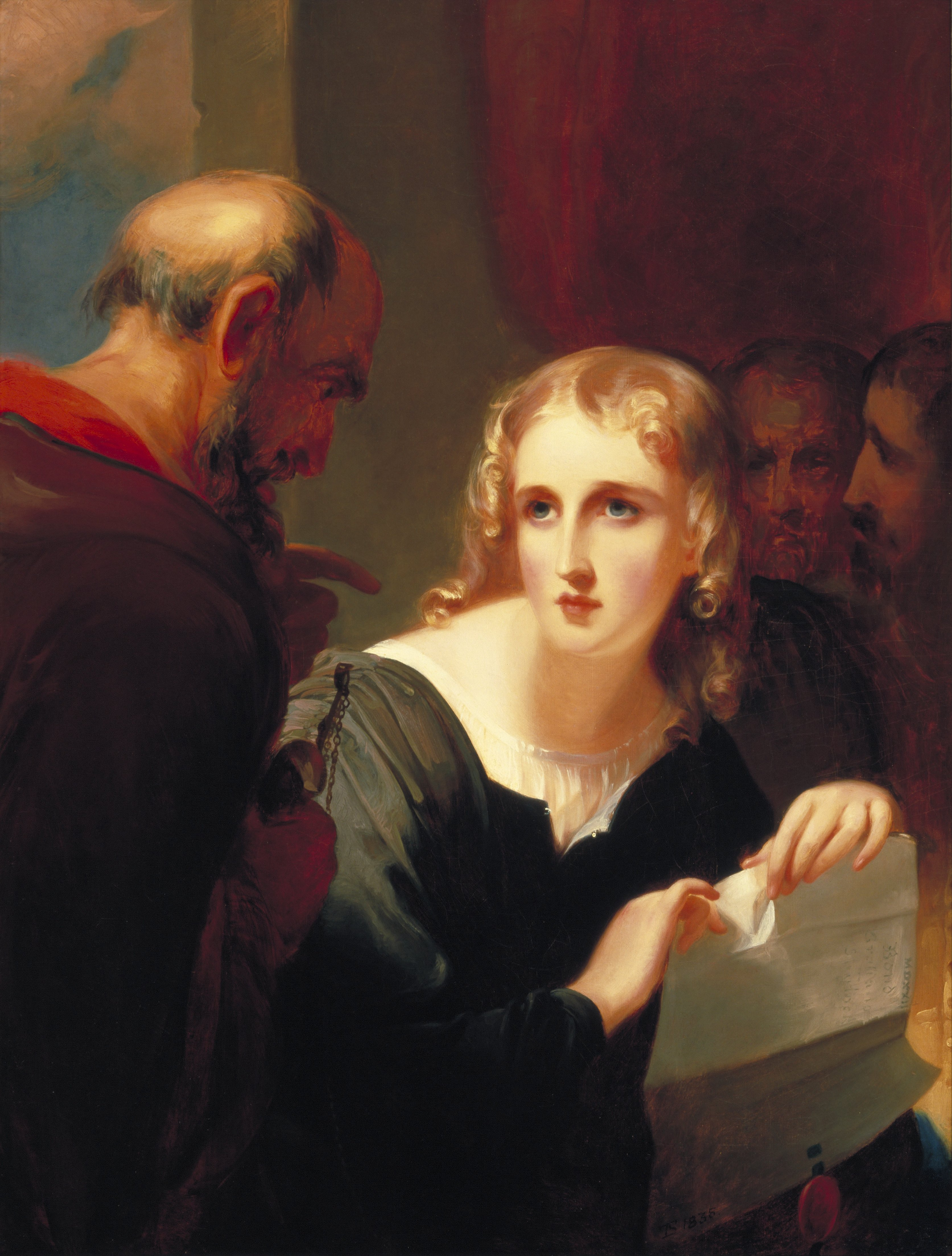
Shylock and Portia (1835) by Thomas Sully

Many modern readers and theatregoers have read the play as a plea for tolerance, noting that Shylock is a sympathetic character. They cite as evidence that Shylock's "trial" at the end of the play is a mockery of justice, with Portia acting as a judge when she has no right to do so. The characters who berated Shylock for dishonesty resort to trickery in order to win. In addition to this, Shakespeare gives Shylock one of his most eloquent speeches:

SALARINO: Why, I am sure if he forfeit, thou wilt not
take his flesh! What's that good for?

SHYLOCK: To bait fish withal; if it will feed nothing else,
it will feed my revenge. He hath disgraced me and
hindered me half a million, laughed at my losses,
mocked at my gains, scorned my nation, thwarted
my bargains, cooled my friends, heated mine enemies—
and what's his reason? I am a Jew. Hath not
a Jew eyes? Hath not a Jew hands, organs, dimensions,
senses, affections, passions? Fed with the
same food, hurt with the same weapons, subject to
the same diseases, healed by the same means,
warmed and cooled by the same winter and summer
as a Christian is? If you prick us, do we not
bleed? If you tickle us, do we not laugh? If you
poison us, do we not die? And if you wrong us, shall
we not revenge? If we are like you in the rest, we will
resemble you in that. If a Jew wrong a Christian,
what is his humility? Revenge. If a Christian wrong
a Jew, what should his sufferance be by Christian
example? Why, revenge! The villainy you teach me I
will execute, and it shall go hard but I will better the
instruction.

— Act III, scene I, l. 50–72

It is uncertain whether the sympathetic reading of Shylock is due to changing sensibilities among readers or that Shakespeare, a writer who created complex, multi-faceted characters, deliberately intended this reading. Stephen Greenblatt points out that, though Shylock is not a "lovable alien", he is given "more theatrical vitality, quite simply more urgent, compelling life, than anyone else in his world". One of the reasons for this interpretation is that Shylock's painful status in Venetian society is emphasised. To some critics, Shylock's celebrated "Hath not a Jew eyes?" speech redeems him and even makes him into something of a tragic figure; in the speech, Shylock argues that he is no different from the Christian characters. Detractors note that Shylock ends the speech with a tone of revenge: "if you wrong us, shall we not revenge?" Those who see the speech as sympathetic point out that Shylock says he learned the desire for revenge from the Christian characters: "If a Christian wrong a Jew, what should his sufferance be by Christian example? Why, revenge. The villainy you teach me, I will execute, and it shall go hard but I will better the instruction."

Even if Shakespeare did not intend the play to be read this way, the fact that it retains its power on stage for audiences who may perceive its central conflicts in radically different terms is an illustration of the subtlety of Shakespeare's characterisations. Additionally, when Shylock discovers that his daughter, Jessica, has sold his ring, a gift from his wife Leah, the audience is provided with sympathetic biographical information tangential to the plot.

Later, in the trial Shylock represents what Elizabethan Christians believed to be the Jewish desire for "justice", contrasted with their obviously superior Christian value of mercy. The Christians in the courtroom urge Shylock to love his enemies, although they themselves have failed in the past. Jewish critic Harold Bloom suggests that, although the play gives merit to both cases, the portraits are not even-handed: "Shylock's shrewd indictment of Christian hypocrisy delights us, but ... Shakespeare's intimations do not alleviate the savagery of his portrait of the Jew..."

Notably, in Nazi Germany, concerns arose that the portrayal of Shylock would elicit too much sympathy for the plight of a Jewish person, thus prompting many alterations to the play, including the excision of Shylock's final speech.

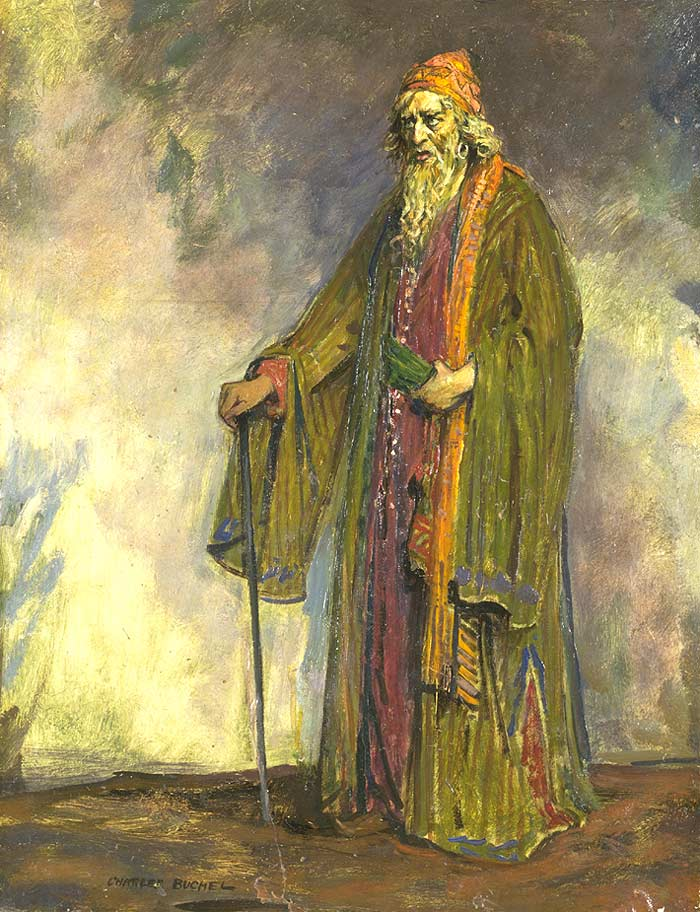
Sir Herbert Beerbohm Tree as Shylock, painted by Charles Buchel (1895–1935)

=== Antonio, Bassanio ===
Antonio's unexplained depression – "In sooth I know not why I am so sad" – and utter devotion to Bassanio has led some critics to theorise that he is suffering from unrequited love for Bassanio and is depressed because Bassanio is coming to an age where he will marry a woman. In his plays and poetry Shakespeare often depicted strong male bonds of varying homosociality, which has led some critics to infer that Bassanio returns Antonio's affections despite his obligation to marry:

ANTONIO [...]
Commend me to your honorable wife,
Tell her the process of Antonio's end,
Say how I loved you, speak me fair in death,
And when the tale is told, bid her be judge
Whether Bassanio had not once a love.
[...]

BASSANIO [...]
But life itself, my wife, and all the world
Are not with me esteemed above thy life.
I would lose all, ay, sacrifice them all
Here to this devil, to deliver you.

— The Merchant of Venice. Act 4, scene 1, ll. 285–298

In his essay "Brothers and Others", published in The Dyer's Hand, W. H. Auden describes Antonio as "a man whose emotional life, though his conduct may be chaste, is concentrated upon a member of his own sex." Antonio's feelings for Bassanio are likened to a couplet from Shakespeare's Sonnets: "But since she pricked thee out for women's pleasure,/ Mine be thy love, and my love's use their treasure." Antonio, says Auden, embodies the words on Portia's leaden casket: "Who chooseth me, must give and hazard all he hath." Antonio has taken this potentially fatal turn because he despairs, not only over the loss of Bassanio in marriage but also because Bassanio cannot requite what Antonio feels for him. Antonio's frustrated devotion is a form of idolatry: the right to live is yielded for the sake of the loved one. There is one other such idolator in the play: Shylock himself. "Shylock, however unintentionally, did, in fact, hazard all for the sake of destroying the enemy he hated, and Antonio, however unthinkingly he signed the bond, hazarded all to secure the happiness of the man he loved." Both Antonio and Shylock, agreeing to put Antonio's life at a forfeit, stand outside the normal bounds of society. There was, states Auden, a traditional "association of sodomy with usury", reaching back at least as far as Dante, with which Shakespeare was likely familiar. (Auden sees the theme of usury in the play as a comment on human relations in a mercantile society.)

Other interpreters of the play regard Auden's conception of Antonio's sexual desire for Bassanio as questionable. Michael Radford, director of the 2004 film version starring Al Pacino, explained that, although the film contains a scene where Antonio and Bassanio actually kiss, the friendship between them is platonic, in line with the prevailing view of male friendship at the time. Jeremy Irons, in an interview, concurs with the director's view and states that he did not "play Antonio as gay". Joseph Fiennes, however, who plays Bassanio, encouraged a homoerotic interpretation and, in fact, surprised Irons with the kiss on set, which was filmed in one take. Fiennes defended his choice, saying "I would never invent something before doing my detective work in the text. If you look at the choice of language ... you'll read very sensuous language. That's the key for me in the relationship. The great thing about Shakespeare and why he's so difficult to pin down is his ambiguity. He's not saying they're gay or they're straight, he's leaving it up to his actors. I feel there has to be a great love between the two characters ... there's great attraction. I don't think they have slept together but that's for the audience to decide." The literary critic Hollis Robbins has suggested that his melancholy is economic in nature, as decline in Venetian shipping monopolies made voyages far more risky.

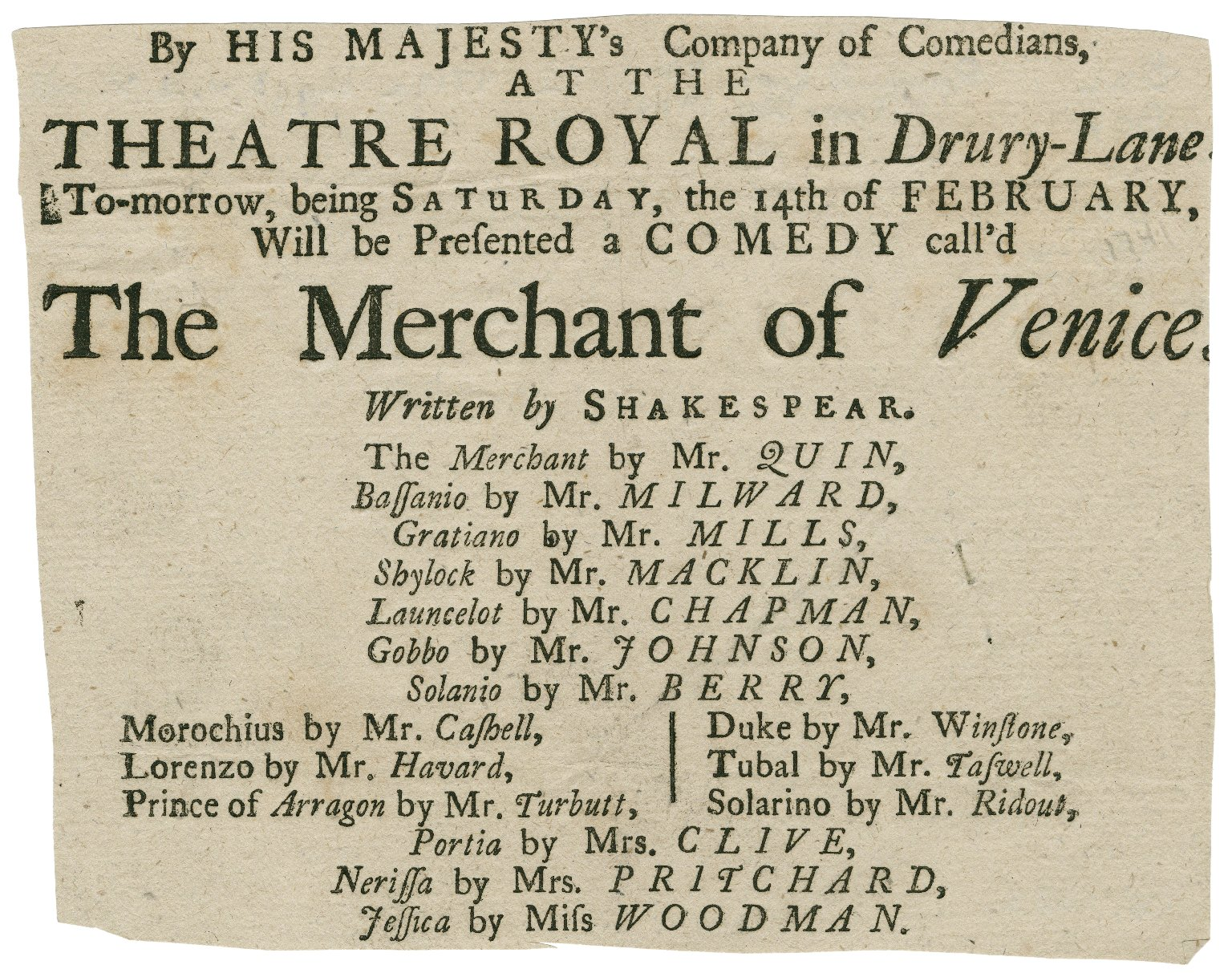
The playbill from a 1741 production at the Theatre Royal, Drury Lane

== Performance history ==
The earliest performance of which a record has survived was held at the court of King James in the spring of 1605, followed by a second performance a few days later, but there is no record of any further performances in the 17th century. In 1701, George Granville staged a successful adaptation, titled The Jew of Venice, with Thomas Betterton as Bassanio. This version, which featured a masque (The Masque of Peleus and Thetis) was popular, and was acted for the next forty years. Granville cut the clownish Gobbos in line with neoclassical decorum; he added a jail scene between Shylock and Antonio; an extended scene of toasting at a banquet scene, and had Bassanio give Portia his ring when she is disguised as a male lawyer, removing any homosexual subtext that could be inferred from that scene in the original play. Thomas Doggett was Shylock, playing the role comically, perhaps even farcically. Rowe expressed doubts about this interpretation as early as 1709; Doggett's success in the role meant that later productions would feature the troupe clown as Shylock.

In 1741, Charles Macklin returned to the original text in a very successful production at Drury Lane, paving the way for Edmund Kean seventy years later (see below).

Arthur Sullivan wrote incidental music for the play in 1871. As part of the 500 year anniversary of the Venetian Ghetto, which converged with the 400 year anniversary of Shakespeare's death, The Merchant of Venice was performed in the ghetto main square in 2016 by the Compagnia de' Colombari.

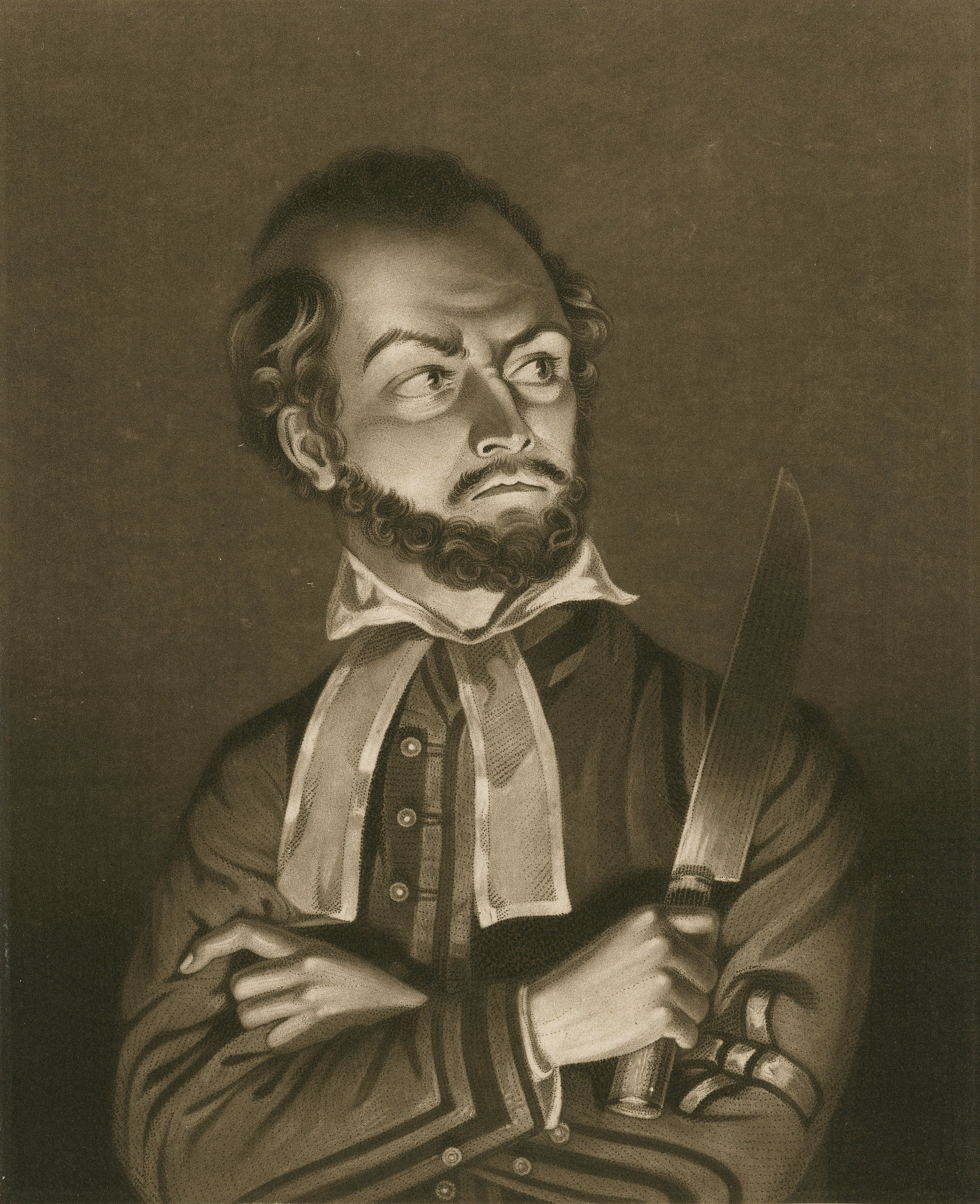
A print of Edmund Kean as Shylock in an early 19th-century performance

=== Shylock on stage ===
Jewish actor Jacob Adler and others report that the tradition of playing Shylock sympathetically began in the first half of the 19th century with Edmund Kean, and that previously the role had been played "by a comedian as a repulsive clown or, alternatively, as a monster of unrelieved evil." Kean's Shylock established his reputation as an actor.

From Kean's time forward, all of the actors who have famously played the role, with the exception of Edwin Booth, who played Shylock as a simple villain, have chosen a sympathetic approach to the character; even Booth's father, Junius Brutus Booth, played the role sympathetically. Henry Irving's portrayal of an aristocratic, proud Shylock (first seen at the Lyceum in 1879, with Portia played by Ellen Terry) has been called "the summit of his career". Jacob Adler was the most notable of the early 20th century: Adler played the role in Yiddish-language translation, first in Manhattan's Yiddish Theatre District on the Lower East Side, and later on Broadway, where, to great acclaim, he performed the role in Yiddish in an otherwise English-language production.

Kean and Irving presented a Shylock justified in wanting his revenge; Adler's Shylock evolved over the years he played the role, first as a stock Shakespearean villain, then as a man whose better nature was overcome by a desire for revenge, and finally as a man who operated not from revenge but from pride. In a 1902 interview with Theater magazine, Adler pointed out that Shylock is a wealthy man, "rich enough to forgo the interest on three thousand ducats" and that Antonio is "far from the chivalrous gentleman he is made to appear. He has insulted the Jew and spat on him, yet he comes with hypocritical politeness to borrow money of him." Shylock's fatal flaw is to depend on the law, but "would he not walk out of that courtroom head erect, the very apotheosis of defiant hatred and scorn?"

Some modern productions take further pains to show the sources of Shylock's thirst for vengeance. For instance, in the 2004 film adaptation directed by Michael Radford and starring Al Pacino as Shylock, the film begins with text and a montage of how Venetian Jews are cruelly abused by bigoted Christians. One of the last shots of the film also brings attention to the fact that, as a convert, Shylock would have been cast out of the Jewish community in Venice, no longer allowed to live in the ghetto. Another interpretation of Shylock and a vision of how "must he be acted" appears at the conclusion of the autobiography of Alexander Granach, a noted Jewish stage and film actor in Weimar Germany (and later in Hollywood and on Broadway).

== Adaptations and cultural references ==
The play has inspired many adaptions and several works of fiction.

=== Film, TV and radio versions ===
- 1914 – The Merchant of Venice, a silent film directed by Lois Weber and Phillips Smalley. Weber played Portia and Smalley, her husband, played Shylock. With this film, Weber became the first woman to direct a full-length feature film in America.
- 1916 – The Merchant of Venice, an unsuccessful silent British film produced by Walter West for Broadwest.
- 1923 – The Merchant of Venice (Der Kaufmann von Venedig), also The Jew of Mestri, a silent German film directed by Peter Paul Felner. Though based in part on Shakespeare's play, it was also based on Christopher Marlowe's The Jew of Malta, as well as stories by Giovanni Fiorentino, Masuccio Salernitano and Pietro Aretino.
- 1941 – Shylock, an Indian Tamil language film directed by the duo Sama-Ramu.
- 1953 – The Merchant of Venice, a French-Italian drama film directed by Pierre Billon and starring Michel Simon, Andrée Debar and Massimo Serato.
- 1961 – The Merchant of Venice, an Australian television adaptation.
- 1969 – The Merchant of Venice, an unreleased 40-minute television film directed by and starring Orson Welles; the film was completed, but the soundtrack for all but the first reel was stolen before it could be released.
- 1972 – The Merchant of Venice, BBC video-taped television version directed by Cedric Messina for the BBC's Play of the Month series. Cast includes Maggie Smith, Frank Finlay, Charles Gray and Christopher Gable.
- 1973 – The Merchant of Venice British Associated Television version directed by John Sichel. Broadcast in the United States over ABC-TV. Set in the late Victorian era, the cast included Laurence Olivier as Shylock, Anthony Nicholls as Antonio, Jeremy Brett as Bassanio, and Joan Plowright as Portia.
- 1980 – The Merchant of Venice, a version for the BBC Television Shakespeare directed by Jack Gold. The cast includes Gemma Jones as Portia, Warren Mitchell as Shylock and John Nettles as Bassanio.
- 1996 – The Merchant of Venice, a Channel 4 television film directed by Alan Horrox. The cast included Bob Peck as Shylock and Haydn Gwynne as Portia.
- 2001 – The Merchant of Venice, a Royal National Theatre production directed by Trevor Nunn. Set around 1930, Henry Goodman played Shylock.
- 2002 – The Māori Merchant of Venice, directed by Don Selwyn. In Māori, with English subtitles. This film was based on a 1945 translation of the play to Māori by Pei Te Hurinui Jones.
- 2003 – In Shakespeare's Merchant, a film directed by Paul Wagar, Antonio and Bassanio have a homosexual relationship.
- 2004 – The Merchant of Venice, directed by Michael Radford and produced by Barry Navidi. This was the first "big-screen" adaptation of the play. The cast included Al Pacino as Shylock, Jeremy Irons as Antonio, Joseph Fiennes as Bassanio, Lynn Collins as Portia, and Zuleikha Robinson as Jessica.
- Broadcast on BBC Radio 3 on 22 April 2018 and transposing the plot from Venice to the City of London and the 2008 financial crisis. The cast included Andrew Scott as Shylock, Ray Fearon as Antonio, Colin Morgan as Bassanio, Hayley Atwell as Portia, and Lauren Cornelius as Jessica.

=== Operas ===
- Josef Bohuslav Foerster's three-act Czech opera Jessika was first performed at the Prague National Theatre in 1905.
- Adrian Welles Beecham, 15-year-old son of Sir Thomas Beecham, composed an operatic version which premiered at the Grand Theatre in Brighton on 18 September 1922 followed by 32 performances at the Duke of York's Theatre in London from 20 November to 16 December 1922. Augustus Milner sang Shylock, later replaced during the run by producer F. R. Benson. Although described in the vocal score as "a Shakespearean Opera" the play was perhaps better defined as a "play with music", with 27 musical sections or arias.
- Reynaldo Hahn's three-act French opera Le marchand de Venise was first performed at the Paris Opéra on 25 March 1935.
- André Tchaikowsky's (1935–1982) opera The Merchant of Venice premiered at the Bregenz Festival on 18 July 2013.
- A modernized interpretation of The Merchant of Venice was staged at the Royal Lyceum in Edinburgh from late 2024 to early 2025.

=== Cultural references ===
Edmond Haraucourt, French playwright and poet, was commissioned in the 1880s by the actor and theatrical director Paul Porel to make a French-verse adaptation of The Merchant of Venice. His play Shylock, first performed at the Théâtre de l'Odéon in December 1889, had incidental music by the French composer Gabriel Fauré, later incorporated into an orchestral suite of the same name.

St. John Ervine wrote a sequel play, The Lady of Belmont, in 1924, in which the characters from Shakespeare's work reunite ten years after the events of the earlier play.

Ralph Vaughan Williams' choral work Serenade to Music (1938) draws its text from the discussion about music and the music of the spheres in act V, scene 1.

In both versions of the comic film To Be or Not to Be (1942 and 1983) the character "Greenberg", specified as a Jew in the later version, gives a recitation of the "Hath not a Jew eyes?" speech to Nazi soldiers.

The rock musical Fire Angel was based on the story of the play, with the scene changed to the Little Italy district of New York. It was performed in Edinburgh in 1974 and in a revised form at Her Majesty's Theatre, London, in 1977. Braham Murray directed.

Arnold Wesker's play The Merchant (1976) is a reimagining of Shakespeare's story. In this retelling, Shylock and Antonio are friends and share a disdain for the crass antisemitism of the Christian community's laws.

David Henry Wilson's play Shylock's Revenge, was first produced at the University of Hamburg in 1989, and follows the events in The Merchant of Venice. In this play Shylock gets his wealth back and becomes a Jew again.

The Star Trek franchise sometimes quotes and paraphrases Shakespeare, including The Merchant of Venice. One example is the Shakespeare-aficionado Chang in Star Trek VI: The Undiscovered Country (1991), a Klingon, who quotes Shylock.

Steven Spielberg's Schindler's List (1993) depicts SS Lieutenant Amon Göth quoting Shylock's "Hath not a Jew eyes?" speech when deciding whether to rape his Jewish maid.

In David Fincher's 1995 crime thriller Seven, a lawyer, Eli Gould, is coerced to remove a pound of his own flesh and place it on a scale, alluding to the play.

The German Belmont Prize was established in 1997, referring to 'Belmont' as "a place of destiny where Portia's intelligence is at home." The eligibility for the award is encapsulated by the inscription on the play's lead casket, "Who chooses me must give and hazard all he hath."

One of the four short stories comprising Alan Isler's The Bacon Fancier (1999) is also told from Shylock's point of view. In this story, Antonio was a converted Jew.

The Pianist is a 2002 film based on a memoir by Władysław Szpilman. In this film, Henryk Szpilman reads Shylock's "Hath not a Jew eyes?" speech to his brother Władysław in the Warsaw Ghetto during the Nazi occupation in World War II.

In the 2009 spy comedy OSS 117: Lost in Rio, a speech by the Nazi Von Zimmel parodies Shylock's tirade.

Christopher Moore combines The Merchant of Venice and Othello in his 2014 comic novel The Serpent of Venice, in which he makes Portia (from The Merchant of Venice) and Desdemona (from Othello) sisters. All of the characters come from those two plays with the exception of Jeff (a monkey); the gigantic simpleton Drool; and Pocket, the Fool, who comes from Moore's earlier novel Fool, based on King Lear.

Naomi Alderman's The Wolf in the Water is a radio-play first broadcast on BBC Radio 3 in 2016. The play continues the story of Shylock's daughter Jessica, who lives in an antisemitic Venice and practices her Jewish faith in secret. Part of the BBC's Shakespeare Festival, the play also marked that 500 years had passed since the Venetian Ghetto was instituted.

Sarah B. Mantell's Everything that Never Happened is a play first produced in 2017 at the Yale School of Drama. Similar to Rosencrantz and Guildenstern Are Dead, the play occurs in the gaps between scenes of the canonical The Merchant of Venice, with the characters gradually recognizing how conflicts over assimilation and antisemitism recur throughout past, present, and future.

== Awards and nominations ==
=== 1973 Broadway revival ===
| Year | Award | Category | Nominee | Result |
|---|---|---|---|---|
| 1973 | Drama Desk Award | Outstanding Performance | Rosemary Harris | Won |

=== 1989 Broadway revival ===
| Year | Award | Category | Nominee | Result |
|---|---|---|---|---|
| 1990 | Tony Award | Best Revival | | Nominated |
| 1990 | Tony Award | Best Actor in a Play | Dustin Hoffman | Nominated |
| 1990 | Tony Award | Best Actress in a Play | Geraldine James | Nominated |
| 1990 | Tony Award | Best Direction of a Play | Peter Hall | Nominated |
| 1990 | Drama Desk Award | Outstanding Revival | | Nominated |
| 1990 | Drama Desk Award | Outstanding Actress in a Play | Geraldine James | Won |
| 1990 | Drama Desk Award | Outstanding Featured Actor in a Play | Dustin Hoffman | Nominated |

=== 2010 Broadway revival ===
| Year | Award | Category | Nominee | Result |
|---|---|---|---|---|
| 2011 | Tony Awards | Best Revival of a Play | | Nominated |
| 2011 | Tony Awards | Best Actor in a Play | Al Pacino | Nominated |
| 2011 | Tony Awards | Best Actress in a Play | Lily Rabe | Nominated |
| 2011 | Tony Awards | Best Direction of a Play | Daniel J. Sullivan | Nominated |
| 2011 | Tony Awards | Best Scenic Design of a Play | Mark Wendland | Nominated |
| 2011 | Tony Awards | Best Costume Design of a Play | Jess Goldstein | Nominated |
| 2011 | Tony Awards | Best Lighting Design of a Play | Kenneth Posner | Nominated |

== See also ==
- List of idioms attributed to Shakespeare

== Sources ==
=== Editions of The Merchant of Venice ===
- Drakakis, John, ed. (2010). The Merchant of Venice. Arden Shakespeare, third series. Bloomsbury. doi:10.5040/9781408160398.00000006. ISBN 978-1-903436-81-3 – via Bloomsbury Drama Online.
- Pearce, Joseph, ed. (2009). The Merchant of Venice. Ignatius Critical Editions. Ignatius Press. ISBN 978-1681495200.

=== Secondary sources ===
- Adler, Jacob (1999). A Life on the Stage: A Memoir. Translated by Rosenfeld, Lulla. New York: Knopf. ISBN 0-679-41351-0.
- Beauchamp, Gorman (2011). "Shylock's Conversion" (PDF). Humanitas. 24: 55–92. doi:10.5840/humanitas2011241/23. S2CID 169983679. Archived (PDF) from the original on 9 October 2022.
- Bloom, Harold; Heims, Neil, eds. (2007). The Merchant of Venice. New York: Infobase. ISBN 978-0-7910-9576-8.
- Burnett, Mark Thornton (2007). Filming Shakespeare in the Global Marketplace. Springer. ISBN 978-0230800809.
- Burrin, Philipe (2005). Nazi Anti-Semitism: From Prejudice to Holocaust. The New Press. ISBN 1-56584-969-8.
- Dautch, Aviva (15 March 2016). "A Jewish reading of The Merchant of Venice". British Library.
- Gross, John (1994). Shylock: A Legend and its Legacy. Touchstone. ISBN 978-0-671-88386-7.
- Hales, John W. (October 1894). "Shakespeare and the Jews". The English Historical Review. IX (XXXVI): 652–661. doi:10.1093/ehr/IX.XXXVI.652. eISSN 1477-4534. ISSN 0013-8266.
- Muir, Kenneth (2005). Shakespeare's Sources: Comedies and Tragedies. New York: Routledge. ISBN 0-415-35269-X.
- Ravid, Benjamin (1992). "From Yellow to Red: On the Distinguishing Head-Covering of the Jews of Venice". Jewish History. 6 (1/2): 179–210. doi:10.1007/BF01695218. ISSN 0334-701X. JSTOR 20101128.
- Shapiro, James S. (2016). Shakespeare and the Jews. New York: Columbia University Press. ISBN 9780231178679.
- Wells, Stanley; Dobson, Michael, eds. (2001). The Oxford Companion to Shakespeare. Oxford Companions to Literature. Oxford: Oxford University Press.
