= A Dirty Job =

2006 novel by Christopher Moore

- First edition cover
- Author: Christopher Moore
- Cover artist: William Staehle
- Language: English
- Genre: Humor, comic fantasy, mystery fiction
- Published: 2006 (HarperCollins)
- Publication place: United States
- ISBN: 0-06-059027-0
- OCLC: 62326926
- Dewey Decimal: 813/.6 22
- LC Class: PS3563.O594 D57 2006
- Preceded by: The Stupidest Angel
- Followed by: You Suck: A Love Story

A Dirty Job is a novel by American writer Christopher Moore, published in 2006. While still full of humor, Moore drew from his own experiences in tending to the needs of close family and friends in the stages of dying.

== Premise ==
Charlie Asher, a "beta-male" (as opposed to "alpha-male") leads a satisfying life as the owner and proprietor of a second-hand store in San Francisco. At the moment when his wife Rachel unexpectedly dies in the hospital a short time after the birth of their first child (Sophie), Charlie is chosen to be a "death merchant" who retrieves souls of the dying and protecting them from the forces of the underworld, while he manages his store and raises his daughter. He realizes the ramifications of this business as clues and complications unfold.

== Movie rights and popularity ==
Shortly after its release, A Dirty Job reached 9th place on the New York Times Best Seller list. An unabridged commercial compact disc recording of A Dirty Job has been issued with narration by Fisher Stevens. As of August 2006 the motion picture rights have been optioned by Chris Columbus and his company, 1492 Productions. In October A Dirty Job won the 2006 Quill Award in the category of General Fiction.

== Characters ==
Charlie Asher: The protagonist of the story, Charlie Asher is the owner of Asher's Secondhand, the thrift shop inherited from his father, where much of the story takes place. Charlie became a death merchant upon witnessing Minty Fresh take his wife's soul object as she died. Over the course of the story, Charlie raises his daughter Sophie while dealing with the ramifications of his soul collecting job.

Minty Fresh: Minty is a nearly seven foot tall African American with a penchant for wearing mint green suits. He is, like Charlie, a death merchant. He runs a second-hand record store in the Castro district of San Francisco.

Jane Asher: Charlie's sister. She helps Charlie raise Sophie when she's around, and she has a bad habit of 'borrowing' Charlie's suits.

Audrey: Tibetan monk with power over the movement of souls and creator of animal chimeras that mysteriously appear.

Detective Alphonse Rivera: A detective with the SFPD, Rivera suspects Charlie of involvement in a number of suspicious deaths.

Ray Macy: One of Charlie's two employees, Ray is a middle-aged retired cop who spends time online connecting with 'desperate Filipinas.'

Lily Severo: Charlie's other employee, Lily is a goth teenager and later a goth chef. She is the only person besides Minty Fresh and Sophie who knows that Charlie is a death merchant.

Mrs. Vladlena Korjev and Mrs. Ling: Middle-aged women who live in Charlie's building and frequently care for Sophie while providing comic relief.

The Morrigan: Babd, Macha, and Nemain, Celtic war deities and denizens of the underworld. Along with Orcus, they are the villains of the novel.

Orcus: Husband of the Morrigan, and powerful force of darkness.

== Appearances of characters from previous novels ==
A few characters from Moore's earlier novels participate in this story: Minty Fresh from Coyote Blue and, because of the story's San Francisco setting (where Bloodsucking Fiends took place), Jody (unnamed in a cameo appearance), The Emperor (and his two "soldiers", Bummer and Lazarus), and detectives Alphonse Rivera and Nick Cavuto. Jody's meeting with Charlie Asher is seen from her perspective, in You Suck: A Love Story, the continuation of Bloodsucking Fiends.

Charlie Asher is referenced several times in Bite Me: A Love Story.

Charlie Asher returns in Secondhand Souls.
