= Eva (opera) =

Eva is a Czech-language opera by Josef Bohuslav Foerster first performed in Prague in 1899. It is one of the "new realism" operas of the turn of the century with strong Moravian Slovak elements.
