= Anima Rising =

2025 fantasy novel by Christopher Moore

- First edition hardcover
- Author: Christopher Moore
- Cover artist: Will Staehle
- Language: English
- Genre: Historical fantasy, satire
- Publisher: William Morrow and Company
- Publication date: May 13, 2025
- Publication place: United States
- Pages: 400
- ISBN: 9780062434159

Anima Rising is a satirical historical fantasy novel by American author Christopher Moore. It was published by William Morrow and Company on May 13, 2025. It takes place in 1911 Vienna and features real historical figures such as Gustav Klimt, Sigmund Freud and Carl Jung as characters, as well as the classic fictional character the Bride of Frankenstein.

== Development ==
When Moore conceived of the novel, it was originally about Gustav Klimt, whom he was drawn to by his "beautiful" paintings. However, as he did more research, he changed the focus to be on Judith, the fictional woman Klimt paints in the novel. The novel is a spiritual sequel to Moore's 2012 novel Sacré Bleu, which is set in 1890 Paris. The setting of Anima Rising is similar to that of Sacré Bleu in that both feature a "genius cluster" of well-known people interacting in the same time and place. He decided to make the novel about the Bride of Frankenstein when he noticed the irony of Frankenstein's monster talking about how much he is suffering to "this woman he's made a sex slave of".

== Synopsis ==
In 1911 Vienna, Gustav Klimt finds the body of a young woman who appears to have drowned in the Danube Canal. Captivated by her beauty, he decides to paint her. When he finds out that she is still alive, he brings her back to the studio and finds out that the woman, whom he has named Judith, cannot remember who she is. Klimt calls on Sigmund Freud to help cure her amnesia. When Freud reaches a dead end, he calls upon his protégé, Carl Jung, who agrees to hypnotize her. While under hypnosis, Judith reveals that she is over one hundred years old, has died and been reborn four times, and was the Bride of Frankenstein. As Judith unravels her complex past, she searches for her true identity and tries to find out who has been secretly following her.

== Reception ==
The unabridged audiobook version, narrated by Mary Jane Wells, won an Audie Award for Fantasy.

Library Journal highly recommended the novel to "those who enjoy historical fiction with a side of fantasy and wry humor." Publishers Weekly called the novel "hilarious", but stated that it "will test some readers' patience". Drew Gallagher praised the novel for its elements of "intrigue" and "comedic genius" in his review for the Washington Independent Review of Books. In his review for Locus, Paul Di Filippo called the novel a "small masterpiece", praising the novel for its "nonstop but never overdone gonzo humor" and its "empathy for all humanity". Also for Locus, Gary K. Wolfe wrote that the novel moves at an "invigorating and suspenseful pace" despite its complex narrative.
