= Practical Demonkeeping =

Novel by Christopher Moore

- First edition
- Author: Christopher Moore
- Language: English
- Genre: Humor, Absurdist fiction, Horror, comic fantasy
- Publisher: St. Martin's Press
- Publication date: Original Hardcover: January, 1992
- Publication place: United States
- ISBN: 0-312-07069-1 (Original Hardcover)
- OCLC: 62912461
- Followed by: Coyote Blue

Practical Demonkeeping is a fantasy novel by American writer Christopher Moore, published in 1992. His first novel, it deals with a demon from Hell and his master. The novel has been translated and published in German, Italian, Japanese, Spanish, Portuguese and Russian. The English language audio book is read by Oliver Wyman.

== Plot summary ==
Travis was born in 1900, yet he has not aged since 1919, because he accidentally called up a demon from hell named Catch as his servant, presumably forever. Ever since then, Travis has been trying to get rid of Catch, but he is unable to do so because he has lost the repository of the necessary incantations. He traces their whereabouts to a fictional town called Pine Cove, along Big Sur coast, where he thinks the woman he gave them to may be residing. Interactions with the townspeople and with a djinn, who is pursuing Catch, create considerable complications.

Several characters from this novel continue their lives in later novels by Moore. Catch appears in a later book (Lamb), but a much earlier period of history; in addition, the setting of Pine Cove itself is revisited for The Lust Lizard of Melancholy Cove and The Stupidest Angel. The fictional town of Pine Cove is described as being within easy driving distance of San Luis Obispo, California.

== Reception ==
Kirkus Reviews described Practical Demonkeeping as a "Good-natured, often funny, but excessively complicated tale", observing that "First-novelist Moore throws in more plot twists than the Pacific Coast highway has curves".
