= Noir (Moore novel) =

2018 novel by Christopher Moore

- Author: Christopher Moore
- Publisher: Morrow/HarperCollins
- Publication date: 2018
- Followed by: Razzamatazz

Noir is a 2018 novel by Christopher Moore. It was published by Morrow/HarperCollins.

== Plot ==
Sammy, a disabled bartender in 1947 San Francisco, falls in love but is soon sucked into a conspiracy involving UFOs.

== Reception ==
The novel got positive reviews from critics. David Pitt called it "a pedal-to-the-metal, exquisitely written comic romp through a neon-lit San Francisco that may never have actually existed."

Publishers Weekly wrote that it "puts an amusing spin on the noir subgenre." Tom Shippey gave the novel a positive review in the Wall Street Journal. Patrick T. Reardon of the Chicago Tribune noted that the book was moodier than most Moore novels but that the character of Sammy matched the "beta male" archetype of Moore's other protagonists. Richard Marcus wrote that the novel captured the setting authentically.

Robert Allen Papinchak of the Los Angeles Review of Books wrote that "While adhering to the basic tenets of noir fiction and film, he surpasses the usual by introducing sci-fi elements into the mix."

While Moore originally intended the novel to have a dark tone, critics noted that it leaned towards the comedic and absurd.
