= Raziel =

Archangel

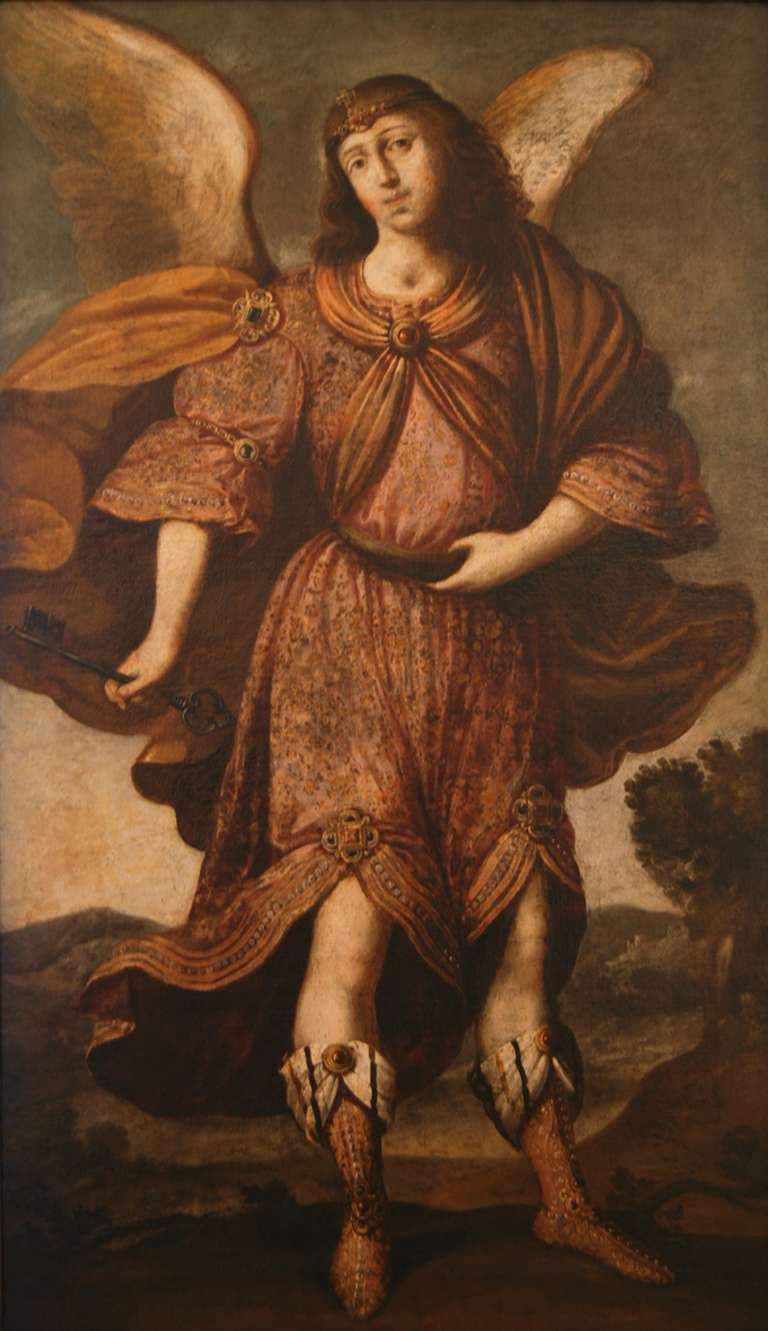
Archangel Raziel (Circle of Francisco de Zurbarán), circa 1650.

Raziel (Hebrew: רָזִיאֵל Rāzīʾēl, "God is my Mystery"), also known as Gallitsur (Hebrew: גַּלִּיצוּר Gallīṣūr), is an angel within the teachings of Jewish mysticism (of the Kabbalah of Judaism) who is the "Angel of Secrets" and the "Angel of Mysteries”. He is also called "Keeper of All Magic." He is one of the angels associated with the sephirah Chokmah of Kabbalah, alongside Jophiel.

The angel Raziel can be compared to the Manda d-Hayyi of Mandaeism. Both are described as intermediaries who convey divine knowledge to humans, especially Adam. In Jewish mysticism, Raziel delivers the "Sefer Raziel" to Adam, containing esoteric secrets about the universe and divine mysteries, while in Mandaism, Manda d-Hayyi instructs Adam about the mysteries of life and creation.

In Mandaeism, after the creation of the material world, Adam Kasia (Adam Kadmon in the Jewish tradition) asks Abatur (Ancient of Days or Metatron in the Jewish tradition. The Merkabah text Re'uyot Yehezkel identifies the Ancient of Days as Metatron) what he will do when he goes to Tibil (Earth or Malkuth). Abatur responds that Adam will be helped by Manda d-Hayyi, who instructs humans with sacred knowledge and protects them.

== Mysticism and tradition ==
Various teachings assign Raziel to diverse roles, including that of a cherub, a member of the Ophanim, and chief of the Erelim.

Raziel, under the alternate name Gallitsur, "Revealer of The Rock", is described as the "ruling prince of the 2nd Heaven". He is said to expound the clear teachings of the "Torah's divine wisdom" and protects the ministering angels from the living creatures that uphold the universe.

== Authorship of Sefer Raziel HaMalakh ==
The famous Sefer Raziel HaMalakh ("Book of Raziel the Angel") attributed to this figure is said to contain all secret knowledge, and it is considered to be a book of magic. He stands close by God's throne and therefore hears and writes down everything said and discussed. He purportedly gave the book to Adam and Eve after they ate from the forbidden tree of the knowledge of good and evil (that resulted in their expulsion from the Garden of Eden) so the two could find their way back "home" and better understand their God. Raziel's fellow angels were deeply disturbed by this, and thus stole the book from Adam and threw it into the ocean. God did not punish Raziel, but instead retrieved the book through the Rahab and returned it to Adam and Eve.

According to some sources, the book was passed on through the generations to Enoch (In 3 Enoch believed to have later become the angel Metatron), who may have incorporated his writings into the tome. From Enoch, the archangel Raphael gave it to Noah, who used the wisdom within to build Noah's Ark. The Book of Raziel was said to have come into the possession of King Solomon, and some texts claiming to be this volume have appeared.

Sefer HaRazim, a 4th-century Jewish mystical text which is distinct from Sefer Raziel HaMalakh, is also said to have been given to Noah by the angel Raziel.

== In popular culture ==
- In the Japanese light novel series Date A Live, Raziel is the name of a spiritual weapon (referred to as Angels within the series), belonging to Nia Honjou and Kurumi Tokisaki. Raziel is a book containing all knowledge of past and present, as well as capable of manifesting anything written in it as reality.
- In Cassandra Clare's The Shadowhunter Chronicles, the angel Raziel is responsible for the creation of the race of Shadowhunters by mixing his blood with mortal men. He also appears as a character within the narrative of the original hexalogy.
- In the video game series Legacy of Kain, Raziel is the name of a vampire and the most trusted lieutenant of Kain. After his supposed hubris of surpassing his master, Raziel is thrown into the abyss to be forever consumed and is reborn as a Reaver of Souls, a wraith that consumes souls.
- In the Mobile Suit Gundam 00 side story Mobile Suit Gundam 00P, one of the mobile suits featured in the side story is named the Gundam Rasiel. It can then be equipped with the GN Sefer to create the Sefer Rasiel which is named after the Sefer Raziel HaMalakh.
- In Robert Stone's novel Damascus Gate, Raziel Melker is a hipster-musician, heroin addict, and devotee of Jewish mysticism who attaches himself to a charismatic but mentally unstable Messiah-figure in 1990s Jerusalem.
- In the book Lamb: The Gospel According to Biff, Christ's Childhood Pal by Christopher Moore (author), Raziel is the name of the angel who resurrects Levi bar Alphaeus (aka Biff) to write another gospel about the childhood of Jesus. He also makes some appearances in the Gospel, saving Levi from drowning off the edge of Titus' ship, among other things.

== See also ==
- Angel
- List of angels in theology
- Jewish mysticism
- Kabbalah
- Sephiroth
- Manda d-Hayyi
- Sefer Raziel
