= Razzmatazz (novel) =

2022 novel

- Author: Christopher Moore
- Publisher: Morrow/HarperCollins
- Publication date: 2022
- Preceded by: Noir

Razzmatazz is a 2022 novel by Christopher Moore. It is a sequel to Noir.

== Plot ==
In San Francisco, 1947, disabled bartender Sammy investigates the serial killing of drag kings.

== Reception ==
Publishers Weekly wrote that "punctuating all the spoofy amateur sleuthing are more serious depictions of the maltreatment of the Chinese and LGBTQ communities, adding some necessary gravitas. Moore's fans and those who like their noir with a side of slapstick and the supernatural will enjoy."

Bernadette Faye of the San Francisco Chronicle compared the novel to Raymond Chandler, but wrote that Moore used more fantasy and absurdist elements.

Shannon Carriger of the San Francisco Book Review praised the novel but felt it became too convoluted. Dean Polling of the Valdosta Daily Times gave the book a mixed review: "a mix of Moore silliness and style, sentimentality and hodge-podge plotting. It's by far not his best novel."
