= Lamb: The Gospel According to Biff, Christ's Childhood Pal =

2002 novel by Christopher Moore

- First edition
- Author: Christopher Moore
- Language: English
- Genre: Humor, mystery, adventure, absurdist fiction, comic fantasy
- Publisher: William Morrow
- Publication date: 2002
- Publication place: United States
- Media type: Print (Hardback & Paperback)
- Pages: 464
- ISBN: 0-380-81381-5
- OCLC: 50518600
- Preceded by: The Lust Lizard of Melancholy Cove
- Followed by: Fluke, or, I Know Why the Winged Whale Sings

Lamb: The Gospel According to Biff, Christ's Childhood Pal is a novel by American writer Christopher Moore, published in 2002. In this work the author seeks to fill in the "lost" years of Jesus through the eyes of Jesus's childhood pal, "Levi bar Alphaeus who is called Biff".

The original edition of Lamb was issued in hardback and paperback and contains an afterword by the author explaining some background of the novel. In 2007 a special gift edition was published, with a second afterword by Moore, recollecting his trip to Israel for research.

According to the author, the producer-director Peter Douglas (with Vincent Pictures) optioned the film rights to the novel.

== Plot summary ==
Biff is resurrected in the 20th century to complete missing parts of the Bible, under the inefficient supervision of the angel Raziel, who places Biff in a motel room in order to prevent any distractions from the modern world. Biff begins his story by recounting his first meeting as a boy with the then six-year-old Joshua. (He explains that the English name Joshua is the best match to the original Hebrew name Yeshua, and "Jesus" is the result of the name being translated through Greek and Latin.) They grow up together, and as young men, they travel eastward to consult the Three Wise Men (a magician, a Buddhist, and a Hindu yogi) who attended Joshua's birth, so Joshua may learn how to become the Messiah. Over twenty years, Joshua surpasses the trio by incorporating their beliefs: he learns to multiply food from one Wise Man and learns to become invisible from another, whereas his ability to resurrect the dead initiates his first meeting with Biff in childhood. Biff is sarcastic, practical, and loyal, a counterpoint to Joshua's temperamental and sometimes idealistic character.

The recounting of Joshua/Jesus's human and godlike qualities, combined with Biff's earthly debauchery, humorously explains the origins of judo and cappuccino, the reasons Jews eat Chinese food on Christmas, and how rabbits became associated with Easter. The Three Wise Men, Mary Magdalene, Joseph, and Mary all appear as well: Mary Magdalene (here nicknamed "Maggie") is depicted as harboring love for Joshua, while Joshua remains celibate and Biff compensates with an active sexuality of his own.

At the novel's conclusion, Biff gives "The Gospel According to Biff" to Raziel and discovers a resurrected Maggie exiting the room opposite his, having finished her own Gospel weeks before. Raziel announces that at Joshua's behest, Biff and Maggie should be united immediately and live out their lives in the modern world.

== Literary allusions ==
The author cited Bulgakov's novel The Master and Margarita—particularly the Biblical scenes told from Pontius Pilate's point of view—as a partial inspiration to create this novel. Other works apparent in the novel are the writings of Lao Tzu, the Kama Sutra, the Torah, the Upanishads, the Bhagavad Gita, Sun Tzu's The Art of War, the Tao Te Ching, and the Gospels of the New Testament. The idea that prior to his public ministry, Jesus traveled to Kashmir, India, to study at a Tibetan monastery was first suggested by Nicolas Notovitch, in his 1894 hoax The Unknown Life of Jesus Christ.

Various references to literature in both the New Testament and the broader Christian apocryphal canon are made. For example, both Matthew and John have stories of Jesus's saliva having mystical properties that help restore a blind man's vision. In Lamb, a young Joshua and his siblings playfully and repeatedly kill a lizard that they then revive by putting it in Joshua's mouth, which is filled with healing saliva, akin to stories in the Infancy Gospel of Thomas that show a young Jesus playing and experimenting with his divine powers.

=== Relation to Moore's other novels ===
- The bumbling Raziel from this novel later is the title character in Moore's The Stupidest Angel.
- Catch, the demon from Moore's debut novel Practical Demonkeeping, makes an appearance in Lamb as the servant of Balthasar, one of the Wise Men.
- Jesus himself made a brief cameo in Moore's earlier novel Island of the Sequined Love Nun.

== Reception ==
Religious scholar Eric Vanden Eykel argues that Lamb was worth studying as a piece of modern Christian apocrypha, arguing against arbitrarily locking apocrypha to non-canonical stories from the period of the Roman Empire. He remarked that students who read Lamb and similar novels commented that it got them thinking about the stories of Jesus in new ways, despite knowing full well these were modern works.

== Sequel ==
In 2015, Moore said of writing a sequel to Lamb, "...I am bound and determined not to do it. At every book signing, somebody will tell me it's his favorite book. Then they say, 'Can't you write another?' But if I write a sequel, let me predict what readers will say. They'll say, 'Well, it was good, but not as good as Lamb.' Why would I want to try to outdo Lamb and then fail and ruin it for everyone? Better just to leave it alone."
