= Viktor Foerster =

Czech painter (1867–1915)

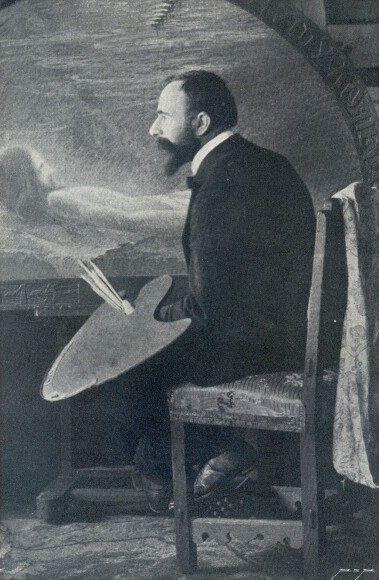
Viktor Foerster, Lnáře, 1904

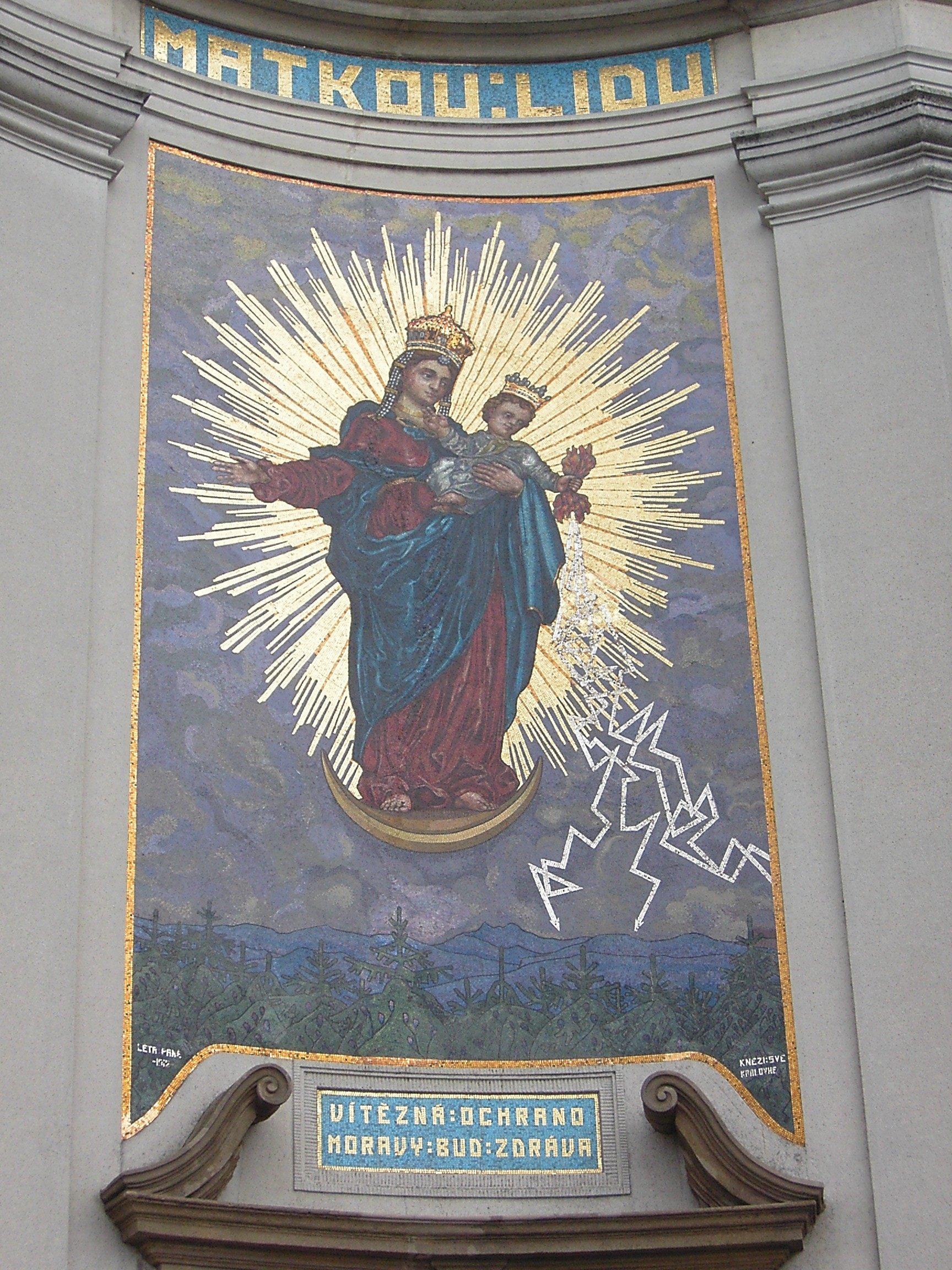

Viktor Foerster (26 August 1867 - 9 December 1915) was a Czech painter and mosaic artist. He was the son of the composer Josef Foerster and younger brother of the composer Josef Bohuslav Foerster.

One of his major works was a large mosaic of the Virgin Mary, which is located in the pilgrimage church in Hostýn at the main temple entrance.

== See also ==
- List of Czech painters
