= Jessika (opera) =

Jessika is a 1905 Czech-language opera by Josef Bohuslav Foerster to a libretto after Shakespeare's The Merchant of Venice and named after the character Jessica in that play.
