= Fool (novel) =

2009 novel by Christopher Moore

- US Edition Cover Art
- Author: Christopher Moore
- Language: English
- Genre: Comedy, absurdist fiction
- Publisher: William Morrow
- Publication date: February 10, 2009
- Publication place: United States
- Media type: Print (hardcover)
- Pages: 336
- ISBN: 978-0-06-059031-4
- OCLC: 232977527
- Dewey Decimal: 813/.6 22
- LC Class: PS3563.O594 F65 2009
- Followed by: The Serpent of Venice

Fool is a novel by American writer Christopher Moore, released on February 10, 2009.

The novel takes its premise from the plot of Shakespeare's play King Lear, narrated from the perspective of the character of the Fool, whose name is Pocket.

In the course of the novel are references to other Shakespeare plays, ranging from short quotations to whole characters—most notably the three witches from Macbeth. While the style of Fool is directed at an American audience, the author incorporates at times Shakespearean vocabulary, archaic syntax, and modern British slang, and obscure cultural terms relating to medieval life, which are explained in footnotes. In addition, Moore invents humorous British-style place-names for fictitious locations in the story.

This novel was followed by a sequel, The Serpent of Venice, released in 2014, which combines characters and plot elements from Shakespeare's The Merchant of Venice and Othello, and Poe's The Cask of Amontillado, while keeping the perspective of Pocket. A second sequel, Shakespeare for Squirrels, places Pocket into a milieu based on Shakespeare's A Midsummer Night's Dream.

== Plot ==
Pocket is the royal fool at the court of King Lear of Britain. To prevent Lear from marrying off his daughter Cordelia, a girl Pocket is especially fond of, he schemes with Edmund of Gloucester. Pocket advises the bastard (i.e., illegitimate) Edmund how to take the land of his legitimate brother Edgar, while Edmund is to prevent the marriage of Cordelia. Edmund somehow gets Lear to ask each of his three daughters – Goneril, Regan and Cordelia – how much they love him. While Goneril and Regan please the old king with their exaggerations, Cordelia enrages him with her famous laconic "I love thee, according to my bond." Lear disinherits Cordelia and divides his kingdom between Goneril and Regan. Notwithstanding, the prince of France marries Cordelia and takes her with him.

Deprived of his adored Cordelia and angry with Lear because of the way Cordelia was treated, Pocket – advised by the ghost of a woman who turns out was not only his deceased lover but also the former queen of Lear and mother of Cordelia – starts his own vendetta: He encourages Goneril and Regan to strip Lear of his remaining power (especially his train of 100 knights, one of the conditions on which Lear passed the kingdom to his daughters) and works to drive the older sisters into war against each other. Lear finally realizes his error and goes temporarily mad. To estrange the sisters he makes both believe that they are in an affair with Edmund of Gloucester. While successful in this, Pocket fails to incite civil war, simply because Cordelia – now a veritable warrior queen – invades Britain with her army from France. Lear, and later on Pocket, end up in the dungeon of the castle now ruled by Edmund, now Earl of Gloucester.

The two elder sisters are in the same castle and ally against Cordelia, but poison each other out of jealousy nonetheless. Edmund confronts Lear and Pocket, and Pocket kills him with his throwing knives. Shortly after, Lear dies. Cordelia invades the castle and becomes queen of Britain. Pocket, who has been told by witches that he is the son of Lear's brother, marries Cordelia and is made king.

== Reception ==
A 2009 review in Entertainment Weekly gave the novel a "B", arguing that "Trapped by calamity, Moore loses his focus to the bloody challenge of finding funny in a bunch of crazy people wandering the cliffs of Dover and dying in droves". Nevertheless, the review praised the character of Pocket and said that Fool "screams for a sequel".

== Popularity ==
The novel debuted in fourth place on the New York Times Best Seller list for hardcover fiction, according to the online issue for February 20, 2009.

The novel has a sequel titled The Serpent of Venice.
