= Secondhand Souls =

2016 novel

- Author: Christopher Moore
- Publisher: HarperCollins
- Publication date: 2016
- ISBN: 978-0-06-177978-7
- Preceded by: A Dirty Job

Secondhand Souls is a 2016 novel by Christopher Moore. It is the sequel to A Dirty Job (2006).

== Plot ==
Charlie, an ordinary man who became a merchant of death, must fight to keep the worlds of the living and the dead in balance while raising his daughter as a single father.

== Reception ==
John Wilwol of the Washington Post called it "wildly entertaining". Tara Campbell wrote that "Diehard devotees of Moore are sure to enjoy Secondhand Souls' madcap plot and zany characters" in the Washington Independent Review of Books.

Sarah Rachel Egelman of Bookreporter wrote "For all the weirdness in these pages, there are some really thoughtful and interesting ideas as well. Moore plays around with world mythology, especially Celtic, Egyptian and Buddhist tales, and successfully merges them into one narrative."

It received a B− review on Dear Author.
