= The Serpent of Venice =

2014 novel

- Author: Christopher Moore
- Publisher: HarperCollins
- Publication date: 2014
- Preceded by: Fool

The Serpent of Venice is a 2014 novel by Christopher Moore.

== Plot ==
The novel is a pastiche based on The Merchant of Venice, Othello and The Cask of Amontillado. The protagonist Pocket of Dog Snogging returns from Moore's 2009 novel Fool.

== Reception ==
Critics reviewed it positively. Robert Doyle of BookReporter wrote that it was "a remarkable reimagining of classic literature, churned through historical backgrounds and research and set to a different drum." Kirkus Reviews called it "Fool's gold, replete with junk jokes, from one of America's most original humorists."

David LaBounty of Dallas News felt that it did not live up to the quality of Fool.

Richard Klinzman of the Florida Times-Union specifically praised its comedic elements.
