= Bite Me: A Love Story =

2010 novel by Christopher Moore

- Author: Christopher Moore
- Language: English
- Genre: Humor, Fiction
- Publisher: William Morrow
- Publication date: March 23, 2010
- Publication place: United States
- Media type: Print (hardback)
- ISBN: 978-0-06-177972-5
- Preceded by: Fool
- Followed by: Sacré Bleu

Bite Me: A Love Story is a novel by American writer Christopher Moore. It debuted at number 5 on The New York Times Best Seller list on April 11, 2010.

It is the third book in to the author's original vampire series Bloodsucking Fiends, from 1995. Bite Me was released on March 23, 2010, by William Morrow and Company.

== Plot ==
Following immediately after You Suck, Bite Me starts with Abby Normal summarizing what happened in the previous books (Bloodsucking Fiends, You Suck). The Emperor is caught in a large fight involving Steven "Foo Dog" Wong, Abby Normal, the Samurai of Jackson Street, and Chet and his horde of vampire kitties. Abby is then kicked out of the "Love Lair" by her mother, Inspector Rivera, and Cavuto.

After that, Foo and Jared run tests on vampire rats to see if they can reverse the process of vampirism. While this is happening the Animals are attacked by hordes of vampire cats. Later Jody and Tommy are freed from their bronze casing, and Tommy, having lost his sanity due to the bronzing, flees to live with the vampire cats. Jody goes after him, while the Animals, along with Inspector Rivera and Cavuto, hunt the vampire cats with a remedy made by one of the Animal's grandmother.

Tommy regains his sanity and returns to the apartment to find Jody, instead finding that Abby has managed to turn herself into a vampire using blood from one of the rats, with an unusual side effect. Meanwhile, Jody is caught in the sun, then saved by The Samurai of Jackson Street (Katusumi Okata), who heals her. The three spawn of the head vampire (Elijah): Makeda, Rolf, and Bella, arrive aboard The Raven to clean up the mess that Elijah has made, including the vampire cats, any additional vampires, and all humans that know of their existence.

The combination of the Animals, Inspectors Rivera and Cavuto, and the three spawn of Elijah manage to kill all the cats except for Chet. Then Tommy and Jody kill Rolf, and the Animals take down Makeda, and finally Bella is killed by Okata, after a failed attack by Chet (who was killed in the process). Tommy and Abby then resume human form. Jody decides to remain a vampire and live with Okata, who is turned into a vampire by the unwilling and imprisoned Elijah. The final scene includes Abby and Tommy together watching the Raven sail away.

== Cameos and continuity ==
Several characters from Bloodsucking Fiends and You Suck appear in this sequel, including the vampire who originally "turned" Jody, Tommy's grocery store co-workers "The Animals", police detectives Rivera and Cavuto, and "The Emperor of San Francisco". Abby Normal, who appeared in You Suck and A Dirty Job is a primary character and her friend Lily, from A Dirty Job has a cameo. The faux Hawaiian Rastafarian Kona from Fluke is featured briefly.

Mrs. Korchev and Lily (aka Darquewillow Elventhing) from A Dirty Job are also briefly mentioned, when Abby and Lily are taunting Mrs. Korchev by chanting "like bear, like bear" until she goes away.
