= Josef Bohuslav Foerster =

Czech composer and musicologist (1859–1951)

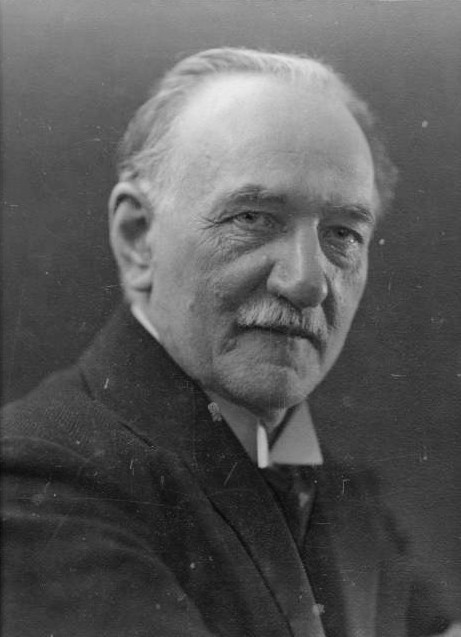
Josef Bohuslav Foerster by Ignác Šechtl

Josef Bohuslav Foerster (30 December 1859 – 29 May 1951) was a Czech composer and musicologist. He is often referred to as J. B. Foerster, and his surname is sometimes spelled Förster.

== Life ==
Foerster was born in Prague. His ancestors were of Bohemian German ethnicity, but had assimilated into the Czech community. The family normally lived in Prague and was musical. His father, a composer also named Josef Foerster, taught at the Conservatory. (His father's students included Franz Lehár.) His brother was artist Viktor Foerster. Josef was educated accordingly, and duly studied there. He also showed an early interest in the theatre, and thought of becoming an actor. He taught music; one of his early students was composer and Stuttgart court pianist Anna Sick. From 1884 Foerster worked as a critic, and he would prove to be a writer of distinction. In 1893 he married the leading Czech soprano Berta Lautererová (Bertha Lauterer) in Hamburg, during ten years making his living there as a critic, and she was engaged at the Hamburg Staatsoper. In 1901 he became a teacher at the Hamburg Conservatory. In 1903 Berta went to sing at the Vienna Hofoper, and so Josef moved there with her, continuing to make a living as a music critic. He returned to Prague on the foundation of the Czechoslovak Republic in 1918, thereafter teaching at the conservatory and the university.

In 1946 he was declared a National Composer. He died in Nový Vestec.

== Style ==
Foerster produced numerous compositions. His music is not nationalistic in the sense of employing the idioms of Czech folk music. His work, words and music, is considered very subjective and personal, mystical and idealistic.

Foerster's opera Eva is another example, like Leoš Janáček's Jenůfa, of a libretto based on a play by Gabriela Preissová, though his treatment differs.

His compositions include five symphonies (No. 1 in D minor; No. 2 in F, Op. 29 (1892–98); No. 3 in D, Op. 36; No. 4 in C minor, Op. 54, "Easter Eve" (1905); and No. 5 in D minor, Op. 141 (1929)), other orchestral works including a symphonic poem based on Cyrano de Bergerac, much chamber music (including five string quartets (No. 1 in E, Op. 15; No. 2, Op. 39; No. 3 in C, Op. 61; No. 4 in F, Op. 182 (1943); and the last, written 1950–1, completed by Jan Hanuš); three piano trios, two violin and two cello sonatas, and a several-times-recorded wind quintet), at least five operas (notably Eva), concertos for cello (Op. 143) and two for violin (No. 1 in C minor, Op. 88 (1911); No. 2 in D minor, Op. 104), liturgical music, among other works, over 170 published opus numbers in all.

Many of his works remember family members: the 2nd Symphony is dedicated to his sister Marie; his brother's death led to the cantata Mortuis fratribus; his son is commemorated in the Piano Trio and the 5th Symphony; and his mother is a theme throughout his oeuvre.

== Selected works ==
=== Symphonies ===
- Symphony No. 1, in D minor, Op. 9 (1888)
- Symphony No. 2, in F major, Op. 29 (1893)
- Symphony No. 3, in D major, Op. 36 (1895)
- Symphony No. 4, 'Easter Eve' in C minor, Op. 54 (1905)
- Symphony No. 5, in D minor, Op. 141 (1929)

=== Other orchestral and concertante ===
- Cyrano de Bergerac, suite for large orchestra, Op. 55
- Slavnostní, overture (1907), Op. 70
- From Shakespeare, for orchestra, Op. 76
- Ballade for violin and orchestra, Op. 92
- Springtime and Desire, for orchestra, Op. 93
- Capriccio for flute and orchestra, Op. 193b
- Klekání, for chorus and orchestra, Op. 151
- In Den Bergen, for orchestra, Op. 7
- Two violin concertos, op. 88 and op. 104.

=== Chamber music and solo works ===
- Scherzo for piano, Op. 11
- String quartet no.1 in E major, Op.15 (1888–93)
- Erotikon for piano, Op. 23
- Cello sonata no.1 in F minor, Op. 45 (published 1905)
- Wind Quintet in D major Op. 95 (1909)
- Fantasy for violin and piano, Op. 128
- Impromptu for organ, Op. 135
- Nonet, Op. 147
- Little suite for two violins, Op. 183

=== Choral works ===
- Te Deum Laudamus, Op. 32
- Missa in Honorem Sc. Methodii (pub. around 1884), Op. 35
- Choruses for male voices, Op. 37
- Missa bohemica, Op. 38
- Stabat mater for mixed chorus and organ, Op. 56
- Missa in honorem sanctissimae trinitatis (1940), Op. 170

=== Songs ===
- Lieder der sehnsucht, six songs, Op. 53

=== Operas ===
- Eva
- Debora (1873), opera, Op. 41
- Jessika (opera)
