= Fluke; or, I Know Why the Winged Whale Sings =

2003 novel by Christopher Moore

- First edition
- Author: Christopher Moore
- Cover artist: Douglas Smythe
- Language: English
- Genre: Science fiction
- Publisher: William Morrow & Company
- Publication date: 3 June 2003
- Publication place: United States
- Media type: Print (Hardcover)
- Pages: 336
- ISBN: 0-380-97841-5
- OCLC: 51087077
- Dewey Decimal: 813/.54 21
- LC Class: PS3563.O594 F58 2003
- Preceded by: Lamb: The Gospel According to Biff, Christ's Childhood Pal
- Followed by: The Stupidest Angel

Fluke; or, I Know Why the Winged Whale Sings is a novel by American writer Christopher Moore. Published in 2003, it combines elements of science fiction with the author's own brand of social commentary and humor. A serious theme in the novel involves environmentalism, particularly that associated with whales; and the author's personal research-experience with marine biologists helped to inform much of the story.

An unabridged commercial audio cassette recording of Fluke has been issued with narration by Bill Irwin and whale songs.

On July 29, 2004, NBC's Today Show author Nicholas Sparks chose Fluke as the next title to be read by the Today Book Club.

== Plot introduction ==
The plot of Fluke is set on and off the Hawaiian island of Maui as well as deep underneath the Pacific Ocean off the shore of Chile.

Nathan Quinn, a marine biologist, goes out on a routine day-trip expedition to survey whales in the area. When he photographs one of the whale's flukes, he notices that the words "BITE ME" are spelled out in huge letters on the mammal's tail-fin. His curiosity and investigations uncover one mystery after another as he seeks the answers concerning the source of this peculiarity.

== See also ==
- Bloop
