= You Suck: A Love Story =

2007 novel by Christopher Moore

- Author: Christopher Moore
- Language: English
- Genre: Humor
- Published: 2007 (William Morrow)
- Publication place: United States
- Media type: Print (hardback)
- Pages: 336
- ISBN: 0-06-059029-7
- OCLC: 76864585
- Dewey Decimal: 813/.54 22
- LC Class: PS3563.O594 Y68 2007
- Preceded by: A Dirty Job
- Followed by: Fool

You Suck: A Love Story is a novel by American writer Christopher Moore.

A sequel to the author's Bloodsucking Fiends, from 1995, released on January 16, 2007 by William Morrow and Company. It is followed by Bite Me, the third novel in the trilogy.

The novel reached sixth place on the New York Times Best Seller list.

== Plot ==
The novel continues the story of Jody and Tommy directly from Bloodsucking Fiends. After Jody turns her boyfriend, Tommy, into a vampire, the two attempted to navigate their new lives together in San Francisco.

== Cameos and continuity ==
Several characters from Bloodsucking Fiends appear in this sequel, including the vampire who originally "turned" Jody, "The Animals"—Tommy's co-workers at the grocery, police detectives Rivera and Cavuto, and "The Emperor". Abby Normal, a minor goth character in A Dirty Job, provides much of the narration from the diary of her adventures as a "minion" of Tommy and Jody. In addition, the plot briefly intersects with that of A Dirty Job, where Jody visits Charlie Asher's store one night to deliver the "soul vessel" of a dying old man whom she just consumed. Although many of Moore's books feature appearances by characters from previous novels, this is the first instance of the same scene shown in two different books, from two different characters' perspectives.
