= The Lust Lizard of Melancholy Cove =

1999 novel by Christopher Moore

- First edition
- Author: Christopher Moore
- Cover artist: Michael McGurl
- Language: English
- Genre: Humor, Fiction, Horror, Comic fantasy, mystery, adventure
- Publisher: Spike/Avon
- Publication date: 1999
- Publication place: United States
- ISBN: 0-06-073545-7
- OCLC: 55704471
- Preceded by: Island of the Sequined Love Nun
- Followed by: Lamb

The Lust Lizard of Melancholy Cove is a novel by American writer Christopher Moore, published in 1999. It is set in the same fictional town of Pine Cove, California, as his first novel, Practical Demonkeeping, and also brings back some of the same characters.

== Plot summary ==
Pine Cove suffers a major crisis when the town psychiatrist, Val Riordan — who has been haphazardly issuing prescriptions instead of dealing with the real mental problems of her patients — suffers a sudden bout of guilt and substitutes all of her patients' anti-depressants with placebos. At this same time, by coincidence, human-generated environmental activity stirs a prehistoric sea-beast from its underwater keep to come ashore.

In addition to its ability to change form, the beast exudes a pheromone that inspires uncontrollable lust among the residents of Pine Cove and also lures some of them as prey. After mistakenly trying to mate with a fuel truck (causing an explosion), the beast hides in a trailer park, attracting the curiosity of local crazy lady and former B-movie star Molly Michon, who builds a rapport with the injured beast.

Meanwhile, Theophilus Crowe, the town constable, investigates a strange suicide, the activities of his corrupt boss, and his adversely affected marijuana habit. When the beast (whom Molly has named "Steve") starts eating residents of Pine Cove and interfering with Theo's boss's methamphetamine business, Molly (who has become romantically involved with the beast) and Theo band together to make possible the beast's safe escape and to take down the boss at the same time.

== Reception ==
James Sallis praised Lust Lizard, saying that Moore's novel provides "[like] all the best comic writing, something beyond jokes, caricature, spinning plates and crazy-tilt towers, something intangible that vanishes whenever we try to look directly at it: some sense, perhaps, that we're still able to rescue from the ever-increasing detritus of our culture a decent, simple humanity."
