= Bloodsucking Fiends =

1995 novel by Christopher Moore

Bloodsucking Fiends: A Love Story
- First edition cover
- Author: Christopher Moore
- Language: English
- Genre: Romance, comedy, horror
- Publisher: Simon & Schuster
- Publication date: September 19, 1995
- Publication place: United States
- Media type: Print (hardcover)
- Pages: 304
- ISBN: 0-684-81097-2
- OCLC: 32129988
- Dewey Decimal: 813/.54 20
- LC Class: PS3563.O594 B58 1995
- Preceded by: Coyote Blue
- Followed by: Island of the Sequined Love Nun

Bloodsucking Fiends: A Love Story is a novel by American writer Christopher Moore, published in 1995. It combines elements of the supernatural and of the romance novel, as well as tongue-in-cheek humor.

Bloodsucking Fiends is the first volume of a trilogy, followed by You Suck: A Love Story (2007) and Bite Me (2010).

== Reception ==
In 1995, a review in Library Journal said that while Bloodsucking Fiends was nothing like the works of Anne Rice, the "delightful tale" was "filled with oddball characters, clever dialog, and hilarious situations that are Moore's trademarks", recalling his novel Coyote Blue (1994).

== Plot summary ==
Jody, a young, single woman living in San Francisco, wakes up in a dumpster after being mugged and discovers she has been turned into a vampire. While attempting to adjust to her new nocturnal lifestyle, she finds the help of Tommy Flood, a wannabe writer who recently moved to the city and works as a night stocking manager (and champion "turkey bowler") at a local Safeway. She has him perform tasks during the day as her vampirism forces her unconscious except after sundown. As Jody and Tommy begin their life together and begin falling in love, they discover that a recent string of mysterious murders may be the work of the vampire who attacked Jody. To get to the bottom of the matter, they recruit "the Animals", Tommy's crew of stockers from the supermarket, as well as an eccentric street person known as "The Emperor" and his faithful dogs.
