= Island of the Sequined Love Nun =

Novel by Christopher Moore

- First edition
- Author: Christopher Moore
- Cover artist: Michael McGurl
- Language: English
- Genre: Romance, Comedy
- Publisher: Avon
- Publication date: 1997
- Publication place: United States
- Media type: Print (Hardback)
- Pages: 325
- ISBN: 0-06-073544-9
- OCLC: 56195254
- Preceded by: Bloodsucking Fiends
- Followed by: The Lust Lizard of Melancholy Cove

Island of the Sequined Love Nun is a novel by American absurdist writer Christopher Moore, published in 1997. It is based partly on the author's personal experiences in Micronesia.

== Plot ==
Tucker (Tuck) Case is a pilot for a cosmetics company, who crashes the company plane while having sex. This event causes Tuck to be blacklisted from flying in the United States, so he accepts a lucrative offer from a doctor-missionary on a remote Micronesian island to transport cargo to and from the island and Japan.

Tuck moves to the island with Kimi, a Filipino trans woman navigator and a talking fruit bat. There Tuck eventually uncovers that the doctor and his wife are secretly harvesting the organs of the island natives, who are under the influence of a cargo cult that developed as a result of establishment by Allies of an air runway there during World War II. They are selling the organs to buyers in Japan.

Eventually, with the help of the ghost of the pilot who crashed on the island during WW2, they are able to escape the island, though Kimi is killed. Tuck returns and is able to fly the islanders to safety. The doctor and his wife are captured by a cannibal.

== Shakespearean allusions ==
In chapter 8, "The Humiliation of the Pilot as a Passenger", Moore alludes to Shakespeare's Hamlet. Tuck is the heir to the Denmark Silverware Corporation, much like Hamlet being the prince. Later Tuck's mother marries his uncle after her husband has a not-so-accidental riding accident resulting in his death.

Tuck is then summoned by an old girlfriend named Zoophilia (similar to Ophelia). While approaching the house in a rage he runs over Zoophilia's father. Zoophilia meets her demise by taking a handful of Prozac and a mouthful of water then drowns in her hot tub, grief-stricken. Before Tuck leaves he is threatened by Zoophilia's brother.
