= Christopher Moore (author) =

American writer

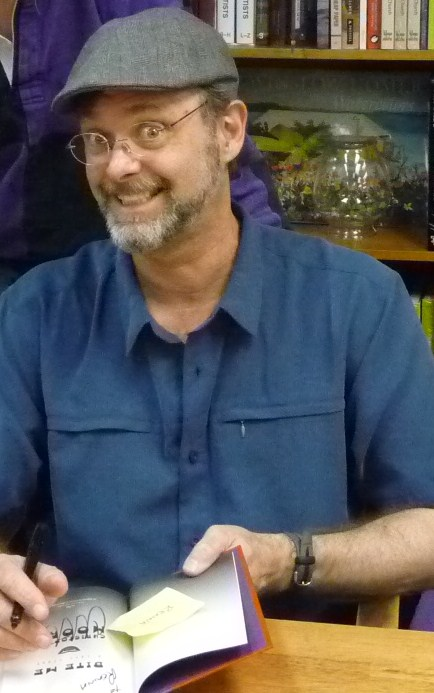
- Moore signing a copy of Bite Me at Politics and Prose in Washington, D.C., April 2010
- Born: January 1, 1957 (age 69); Toledo, Ohio, U.S.
- Education: Ohio State University, Brooks Institute of Photography
- Occupation: Novelist
- Writing career
- Genres: Humor, fantasy, horror, absurdist fiction, comic fantasy, mystery fiction, adventure fiction
- Website: chrismoore.com

Christopher Moore (born January 1, 1957) is an American writer.

== Early life ==
Christopher Moore was born in Toledo and grew up in Mansfield, Ohio. An only child, he learned to amuse himself with his imagination. He loved reading and his father brought him plenty of books from the library every week. He started writing around the age of 12 and realized that it was his talent by the time he was 16. He began to consider making it his career.

Moore attended Ohio State University in Columbus and Brooks Institute of Photography in Santa Barbara, California.

== Writing career ==
Moore's novels typically involve conflicted everyman characters struggling through supernatural or extraordinary circumstances. Excluding Fool, The Serpent of Venice, Sacré Bleu, and Shakespeare for Squirrels: A Novel, all of his books take place in the same universe and some characters recur from novel to novel.

According to his interview in the June 2007 issue of Writer's Digest, the film rights to Moore's first novel, Practical Demonkeeping (1992), were purchased by Disney even before the book had a publisher. In answer to repeated questions from fans over the years, Moore said that all of his books have been optioned or sold for films, but as of yet "none of them are in any danger of being made into a movie."

Moore names Kurt Vonnegut, Douglas Adams, John Steinbeck, Tom Robbins, Richard Brautigan, Robert Bloch, Richard Matheson, Jules Verne, Ray Bradbury, H. P. Lovecraft, Edgar Allan Poe, and Ian Fleming as being key influences on his writing.

== Personal life ==
Since at least June 2006, Moore lives in San Francisco, after a few years of being on the island of Kauai.

== Bibliography ==
=== Novels ===
Moore's novels typically take place in the same fictional universe since characters from one book frequently turn up as minor characters or have cameos in other books. Some novels with a common protagonist or setting can be grouped into series. However, with the exception of the vampire books and the Death Merchant Chronicles, they can be read as stand-alone novels.

==== Pine Cove ====
- Practical Demonkeeping (1992)
- The Lust Lizard of Melancholy Cove (1999)
- The Stupidest Angel: A Heartwarming Tale of Christmas Terror (2004); William Morrow; ISBN 0-06-084235-0
  - The Stupidest Angel: A Heartwarming Tale of Christmas Terror, v. 2.0 (2005)–contains the same text as the above, with an additional 35-page short story at the end

==== A Love Story ====
1. Bloodsucking Fiends: A Love Story (1995)
2. You Suck: A Love Story (2007); William Morrow; ISBN 0-06-059029-7
3. Bite Me: A Love Story (2010); William Morrow; ISBN 978-0-06-177972-5

==== Death Merchant Chronicles ====
- A Dirty Job (2006); William Morrow; ISBN 0-06-059027-0
- Secondhand Souls (2015) HarperCollins Publishers; ISBN 978-0-06-177978-7

==== Chronicles of Pocket the Fool ====
- Fool (2009); William Morrow; ISBN 0-06-059031-9
- The Serpent of Venice (2014); William Morrow; ISBN 978-0-06-177976-3
- Shakespeare for Squirrels: A Novel (2020); New York: William Morrow; ISBN 978-0062434029

==== The Tales of Sammy "Two Toes" ====
- Noir (2018); New York: William Morrow; ISBN 978-0-06-243397-8
- Razzmatazz (2022); William Morrow; ISBN 978-0-06-243412-8

==== Other novels ====
- Coyote Blue (1994)
- Island of the Sequined Love Nun (1997)
- Lamb: The Gospel According to Biff, Christ's Childhood Pal (2002); William Morrow; ISBN 0-380-81381-5
- Fluke, or, I Know Why the Winged Whale Sings (2003); William Morrow; ISBN 0-380-97841-5
- Sacré Bleu (2012); William Morrow; ISBN 978-0-06-177974-9
- Anima Rising (2025); William Morrow; ISBN 978-0-06-243415-9

=== Short stories ===
- "Our Lady of the Fishnet Stockings" (1987)
- "Cat's Karma" (1987)

=== Other works ===
- The Griff: A Graphic Novel (2011, co-written with Ian Corson and illustrated by Jennyson Rosero, originally conceived in 2001 as a movie script); William Morrow; ISBN 978-0-06-197752-7
