= The Merchant of Venice (1923 film) =

1923 film by Peter Paul Felner

- Directed by: Peter Paul Felner
- Written by: William Shakespeare (play); Peter Paul Felner; Giovanni Fiorentino
- Produced by: Peter Paul Felner
- Starring: Werner Krauss; Henny Porten; Harry Liedtke; Carl Ebert
- Cinematography: Axel Graatkjaer; Rudolph Maté
- Edited by: Peter Paul Felner
- Music by: Michael Krausz
- Production company: Peter Paul Felner-Film
- Distributed by: Phoebus Film
- Release date: 13 October 1923
- Country: Germany
- Languages: Silent; German intertitles

The Merchant of Venice (German: Der Kaufmann von Venedig) is a 1923 German silent drama film directed by Peter Paul Felner and starring Werner Krauss, Henny Porten and Harry Liedtke. The film is an adaptation of William Shakespeare's play The Merchant of Venice. It was released in the United States in 1926 as The Jew of Mestri. The film was made on location in Venice, with scenes and characters added which were not in the original play. This is the surviving copy, being two reels shorter than the German version. The characters in the German retained Shakespeare's nomenclature, but in the American they were given new names sourced from the Italian work Il Pecorone, a 14th-century short story collection attributed to Giovanni Fiorentino, from which Shakespeare is believed to have drawn his idea. The film purports to be a return to the original, as an excuse for its differences from the play.

Full film

== Cast ==
The characters are renamed in the extant English script.

- Werner Krauss - Shylock (Mordecai)
- Henny Porten - Porzia (Beatrice)
- Harry Liedtke - Bassanio (Giannetto)
- Carl Ebert - Antonio (Benito) (Note: Antonio in Shakespeare and the German; Benito in the American; Ansaldo in Il Pecorone.)
- Max Schreck - Der Doge von Venedig (Doge of Venice)
- Ferdinand von Alten - Prinz von Arragon (Prince of Aragon)
- Albert Steinrück - Tubal (Tubal)
- Frida Richard - Shylocks Mutter (Wife of Mordecai)
- Lia Eibenschütz - Jessica (Rachela)
- Hans Brausewetter - Lanzelot Gobbo (Elias)
- Jakob Tiedtke - Beppo (Marco)

== Synopsis ==
The script varies significantly from Shakespeare's original.

Mordecai, The Jew of Mestri, has a young daughter, Rachela, whom he has betrothed against her will to Elias, the son of his merchant friend Tubal. Rachela is secretly in love with the Signor Lorenzo, a Venetian gentleman - and a Christian.

Giannetto is an idle scapegrace who has lost his inheritance and is carelessly living on his affluent merchant friend, Benito, on whom he habitually charges his debts.

The Lady of Belmonte, Signora Beatrice, is an affluent widow in the region, whose hand is much sought after. Giannetto visits her and also falls for her charms. The Prince of Aragon is the most distinguished of her many suitors, but she despises him as a vain popinjay.

Beatrice is immediately favourable towards Giannetto's suit, but Aragon tell her that he is in fact an idle pauper, and disappointed she reluctantly consents to marry the Prince instead. Changing her mind after, she seeks out Benito to find whether the tales are true; he convinces her that it is but idle slander, and she promptly plights her troth to Giannetto.

Meantime Rachela has eloped with Lorenzo, and together they seek refuge in Signora Beatrice's house. Her father and the rest of the Jews disown her; as a Christian she is regarded as dead.

Some of Benito's ships have been lost at sea, and when the time comes for his friend's marriage, he cannot defray the costs. Knowing that other of his ships are sure to return in time, he borrows money for him of the Jew of Mestri, giving him a bond for the sum at a month's date. Giannetto reluctantly agrees to this; the forfeit in the bond is a pound of flesh from the defaulter; Benito is confident that he can pay the money in time, Mordecai hopes this will be an opportunity for taking revenge for the loss of his daughter.

The time comes for the bond to expire, and news arrived that the rest of Benito's ships have been destroyed. Rejoicing, Mordecai hauls him before the court, demanding his stipulated forfeit. Giannetto, telling Beatrice of his friend's danger, receives thrice the sum from her coffers and attempts to redeem the bond, but Mordecai is obdurate – the date is past. Beatrice then disguises herself as a Doctor of Law and comes to the court; initially agreeing to the Jew's demands, when he prepares his knife to the breast of Benito she halts him, reminding him that is he is not utterly exact in the flesh he removes - one pound - his life will be forfeit. Sensing this as an impossibility he desists, and the bond is annulled. Benito offers the fair Doctor payment for her services, but she refuses, desiring only as a courtesy a ring of Giannetto - the same she had herself given him, bidding him keep it always; he reluctantly gives it up. Returning home, she chides him with his want of faith at losing her gift, before revealing her deception. The lovers reunite, Lorenzo marries Rachela and Giannetto Beatrice. Old Mordecai is left alone and desolate.
