= Shylock (1940 film) =

1941 film directed by Kinema Ramu and Serukalathur Sama

- Theatrical release poster
- Directed by: Sama-Ramu
- Screenplay by: Kinema Ramu
- Based on: The Merchant of Venice by William Shakespeare
- Starring: Serukalathur Sama
- Cinematography: K. Prabhakar
- Edited by: T. R. S. Raghavan
- Music by: S. G. Kasi Iyer
- Production company: Bharat Pictures
- Release date: 23 November 1940
- Country: India
- Language: Tamil

Shylock is a 1940 Indian Tamil-language film directed by Kinema Ramu and Serukalathur Sama (under the name Sama-Ramu) and produced by Bharat Pictures. It is based on William Shakespeare's play The Merchant of Venice, and features Sama as the title character. The film was released on 23 November 1940 and failed commercially. No print of it is known to survive, making it a lost film.

== Cast ==
- Serukalathur Sama as Shylock
- T. S. Santhanam as Bassanio
- S. G. Kasi Iyer as Antonio
- T. V. Janakam as Portia
- Jayagouri as Jessica
- Halasyam as Lancelot
- P. S. Sivaramalingam as the Duke

== Production ==
Kinema Ramu, a lawyer based in Kumbakonam and scholar on William Shakespeare, wrote the screenplay for Shylock, a Tamil adaptation of Shakespeare's play The Merchant of Venice. He and his friend Serukalathur Sama directed the film under the name Sama-Ramu. The film was produced by Bharat Pictures. Sama also played the title character. The lyricists were Yaanai Vaidyanatha Iyer, P. S. Sivaramalingam (who acted onscreen as the Duke) and Papanasam Rajagopala Iyer, brother of Papanasam Sivan. S. G. Kasi Iyer, the brother of Tamil theatre actor S. G. Kittappa, was the music composer, besides playing Antonio onscreen. Cinematography was handled by K. Prabhakar, and editing by T. R. S. Raghavan. Shooting took place at Bharat Movietone in Kilpauk. The makers went to great lengths to recreate an authentic Venetian look for the narrative through the costumes and setting.

== Release and reception ==
Shylock was released on 23 November 1940. Kay Yess Enn of The Indian Express wrote on the same day, "To attempt to bring Shakespeare on the screen and to succeed at that keeping faithfully to the original, is a creditable achievement standing in the name of Serukulathur Sama and Rama". The film did not succeed commercially; according to historian Randor Guy, this was because audiences could not relate to the characters, costumes and sets. No print of the film is known to survive, making it a lost film.
