= The Merchant of Venice (2004 film) =

2004 film by Michael Radford

- Theatrical release poster
- Directed by: Michael Radford
- Screenplay by: Michael Radford
- Based on: The Merchant of Venice by William Shakespeare
- Produced by: Cary Brokaw; Michael Cowan; Jason Piette; Barry Navidi; Luciano Martino
- Starring: Al Pacino; Jeremy Irons; Joseph Fiennes; Lynn Collins
- Cinematography: Benoît Delhomme
- Edited by: Lucia Zucchetti
- Music by: Jocelyn Pook
- Production companies: UK Film Council; Arclight Films; Spice Factory; MoVision Entertainment
- Distributed by: Metro-Goldwyn-Mayer; Optimum Releasing (United Kingdom); Istituto Luce (Italy)
- Release dates: 3 December 2004 (UK); 11 February 2005 (Italy)
- Running time: 131 minutes
- Countries: United Kingdom; Italy; Luxembourg
- Language: English
- Budget: $30 million
- Box office: $21,417,725

The Merchant of Venice is a 2004 romantic drama film directed by Michael Radford, based on William Shakespeare's play. It is the first full-length sound film in English of the play—other versions are videotaped productions that were made for television, including John Sichel's 1973 version and Jack Gold's 1980 BBC production.

The title character is the merchant Antonio (Jeremy Irons), not the Jewish moneylender Shylock (Al Pacino), who is traditionally viewed as the antagonist and more prominent character. This adaptation follows the text but omits much. Director Michael Radford believed that Shylock was Shakespeare's first great tragic hero, who reaches a catastrophe due to his own flaws. The film begins with text and a montage of how the Jewish community is abused by the Christian population of Venice and brings attention to the fact that, as a convert, Shylock would have been cast out of the Jewish ghetto in Venice.

A co-production by the United Kingdom, Italy and Luxembourg, The Merchant of Venice was screened non-competitively at the 61st edition of the Venice Film Festival on 4 September 2004, in what was touted as its world premiere (the film was actually screened on 3 September 2004 at the Telluride Film Festival).

== Plot ==
Bassanio, a young Venetian, wants to travel to Belmont to woo the wealthy heiress Portia. He approaches his merchant friend Antonio for 3000 ducats needed to subsidize his travelling expenditures. As all of Antonio's ships and merchandise are tied at sea, Antonio approaches the Jewish moneylender Shylock for a loan. Shylock, spiteful of Antonio (whom the movie implies to be an ex-Jew converted to Christianity) because he had previously insulted and spat on him (for being a Jew), proposes a condition. If Antonio cannot repay the loan at the specified date, Shylock will be free to take a pound of Antonio's flesh. Bassanio tries to stop this, but Antonio, surprised by the moneylender's apparent generosity, signs the agreement. With money at hand, Bassanio departs with another friend, Gratiano.

At Belmont, Portia has no lack of suitors. Her father, however, has left a will stipulating that each suitor choose one of three caskets: one each of gold, silver and lead. To be granted an opportunity to marry Portia, each man must agree in advance to live out his life as a bachelor were he to select wrongly. The suitor who correctly looks past the outward appearance of the caskets will find Portia's portrait inside and win her hand. Bassanio makes the correct choice, that of the leaden casket.

At Venice, all ships bearing Antonio's goods are reported lost at sea, leaving him unable to satisfy the bond. Shylock is determined to exact revenge from Christians after his daughter Jessica flees his home to convert to Christianity and elope with the Christian Lorenzo, taking a lot of Shylock's wealth with her. With the bond at hand, Shylock has Antonio arrested and brought before court.

At Belmont, Portia and Bassanio get married. A letter soon announces that Antonio has defaulted on his loan. Shocked, Bassanio and Gratiano leave for Venice with money from Portia to save Antonio's life. Unbeknown to the two friends, Portia and her handmaid Nerissa also leave Belmont.

In the court of the Duke of Venice, Shylock refuses Bassanio's offer, despite Bassanio increasing the repayment to twice the specified loan. He demands the pound of flesh from Antonio. The Duke, wishing to save Antonio but unwilling to set a dangerous legal precedent, refers the case to Balthasar, a young "doctor of the law" who is actually Portia in disguise. The lawyer's clerk is Nerissa in disguise. Portia asks Shylock to show mercy, but Shylock refuses. Thus, the court allows Shylock to extract the pound of flesh.

At the moment when Shylock is about to cut Antonio with his knife, Portia points to a flaw in the contract. The bond allows Shylock to remove only the flesh, not the blood, of Antonio. If Shylock were to shed any drop of Antonio's blood, his "lands and goods" will be forfeited under Venetian laws.

Defeated, Shylock accedes to accept monetary payment for the defaulted bond, but he is denied. Portia pronounces that none should be given, and for his unsuccessful attempt to take the life of a citizen, Shylock's property will be forfeited, half to the government and half to Antonio, and his life will be at the mercy of the Duke. The Duke pardons his life, and Antonio holds his share "in use" (that is, reserving the principal amount while taking only the income) until Shylock's death, after which the principal will be given to Lorenzo and Jessica. At Antonio's request, the Duke grants remission of the state's half of forfeiture, but in return, Shylock is forced to convert to Christianity and to bequeath the rest of his property to Lorenzo and Jessica.

Bassanio does not recognize his disguised wife and offers to give her a present. First, she declines, but after he insists, Portia requests his ring and Antonio's gloves, Bassanio reluctantly giving the ring only after much persuasion from Antonio, as he had promised his wife never to lose it, sell it nor give it away.

At Belmont, Portia and Nerissa taunt their husbands before revealing what they did at the court. After all the other characters make amends, Antonio learns that three of his ships have returned safely after all.

== Cast ==
- Al Pacino as Shylock
- Jeremy Irons as Antonio
- Joseph Fiennes as Bassanio
- Lynn Collins as Portia
- Zuleikha Robinson as Jessica
- Kris Marshall as Gratiano
- Charlie Cox as Lorenzo
- Heather Goldenhersh as Nerissa
- Mackenzie Crook as Launcelot Gobbo
- John Sessions as Salerio
- Gregor Fisher as Solanio
- Ron Cook as Old Gobbo
- Allan Corduner as Tubal
- Anton Rodgers as The Duke
- David Harewood as Prince of Morocco
- Jules Werner as Franciscan Friar

== Reception ==
The Merchant of Venice received generally positive reviews. On the review aggregator website Rotten Tomatoes, 72% of 125 critics' reviews are positive. The website's consensus reads: "A respectable if uneven take on the Bard's The Merchant of Venice." Metacritic, which uses a weighted average, assigned the film a score of 63 out of 100, based on 35 critics, indicating "generally favorable" reviews.

Most critics praised both the interpretation of the Shylock character by Michael Radford and Al Pacino, and the dark, realistic look of the streets of Venice, for which production designer Bruno Rubeo was honoured by the Italian National Syndicate of Film Journalists. Reception to the film's treatment of antisemitism was mixed, with some critics praising Radford's contextualizing choices but feeling that they were nonetheless unable to fully prevent Shylock from being an antisemitic caricature, and others feeling that Shylock's villainy was sanitised to make him into an overly sympathetic victim of prejudice. The film was noted for its emphasis on the love triangle aspect of Bassanio's relationships with Antonio and Portia, including a kiss between Bassanio and Antonio.

In 2005, the film had a Royal Premiere in the presence of Prince Charles and received a BAFTA nomination for Best Costume Design.

Its worldwide theatrical gross was about $21.3 million, with a production budget of $30 million.
