= The Merchant of Venice (disambiguation) =

The Merchant of Venice is a play by William Shakespeare.

The Merchant of Venice may also refer to:

- The Merchant of Venice (1914 film), a lost American silent film
- The Merchant of Venice (1916 film), a British silent film
- The Merchant of Venice (1923 film), a German silent film
- The Merchant of Venice (1953 film), a French-Italian drama
- The Merchant of Venice (1961 film), an Australian TV film
- The Merchant of Venice (1969 film), a partially lost American film
- The Merchant of Venice (1972 film), a British TV version for the BBC's Play of the Month series
- The Merchant of Venice (1973 film), a British TV version for Associated Television
- The Merchant of Venice (1980 film), a British TV film for season three of BBC Television Shakespeare
- The Merchant of Venice (1996 film), a British TV version for Channel 4
- The Merchant of Venice (2001 film), a British Royal National Theatre production restaged for TV
- The Merchant of Venice (2004 film), an American film
- The Merchant of Venice, a 2018 British BBC Radio 3 radio broadcast
- The Merchant of Venice (opera), by André Tchaikowsky

== See also ==
- The Maori Merchant of Venice, a 2002 New Zealand film
- Merchant of Venus, board game
- The Merchants of Venus, science fiction novel by Frederik Pohl
- Rainbow Prelude, which contains a manga version of The Merchant of Venice
