= The Merchant of Venice (1914 film) =

1914 film by Lois Weber and Phillips Smalley

- Directed by: Phillips Smalley; Lois Weber
- Written by: Lois Weber
- Based on: the play The Merchant of Venice by William Shakespeare
- Produced by: Carl Laemmle
- Starring: Phillips Smalley; Lois Weber
- Cinematography: Dal Clawson
- Distributed by: Universal Film Manufacturing Company
- Release date: February 1914
- Running time: 4 reels
- Country: USA
- Language: Silent. English intertitles

The Merchant of Venice is a lost 1914 American silent film historical drama based on William Shakespeare's play. It was directed by and starred Phillips Smalley and Lois Weber, a husband and wife directing team. It was produced and distributed by Universal Film Manufacturing Company.

== Cast ==
- Phillips Smalley - Shylock
- Lois Weber - Portia
- Douglas Gerrard - Bassanio
- Rupert Julian - Antonio
- Jeanie Macpherson - Nerissa
- Edna Maison - Jessica
- Fred L. Wilson -
