= Shylock (disambiguation) =

Shylock is the principal antagonist of William Shakespeare's play The Merchant of Venice.

Shylock may also refer to:

- Shylock (Fauré), incidental music by Gabriel Fauré
- Shylock (1940 film), a 1940 Indian Tamil-language film
- Shylock (2020 film), an Indian Malayalam-language film
- Shylock (play), a monologue by Mark Leiren-Young, premiered 1996
- Shylock, a one-man play by Gareth Armstrong, premiered 1998
- Shylock (musical), a 1987 musical based on The Merchant of Venice
- Shylock (antisemitic slur), an antisemitic slur used to stereotype a Jewish person as a loan shark in reference to the antagonist of The Merchant of Venice

== See also ==
- The Merchant of Venice (disambiguation)
