= Shulock =

Shulock is a surname. Notable people with the surname include:

- John Shulock (1949–2025), American baseball umpire
- Margaret Shulock (1949–2021), American cartoonist

== See also ==
- Shurlock, people with this surname
- Shylock (disambiguation)
