= Jessica (The Merchant of Venice) =

Character in The Merchant of Venice

- The Merchant of Venice character
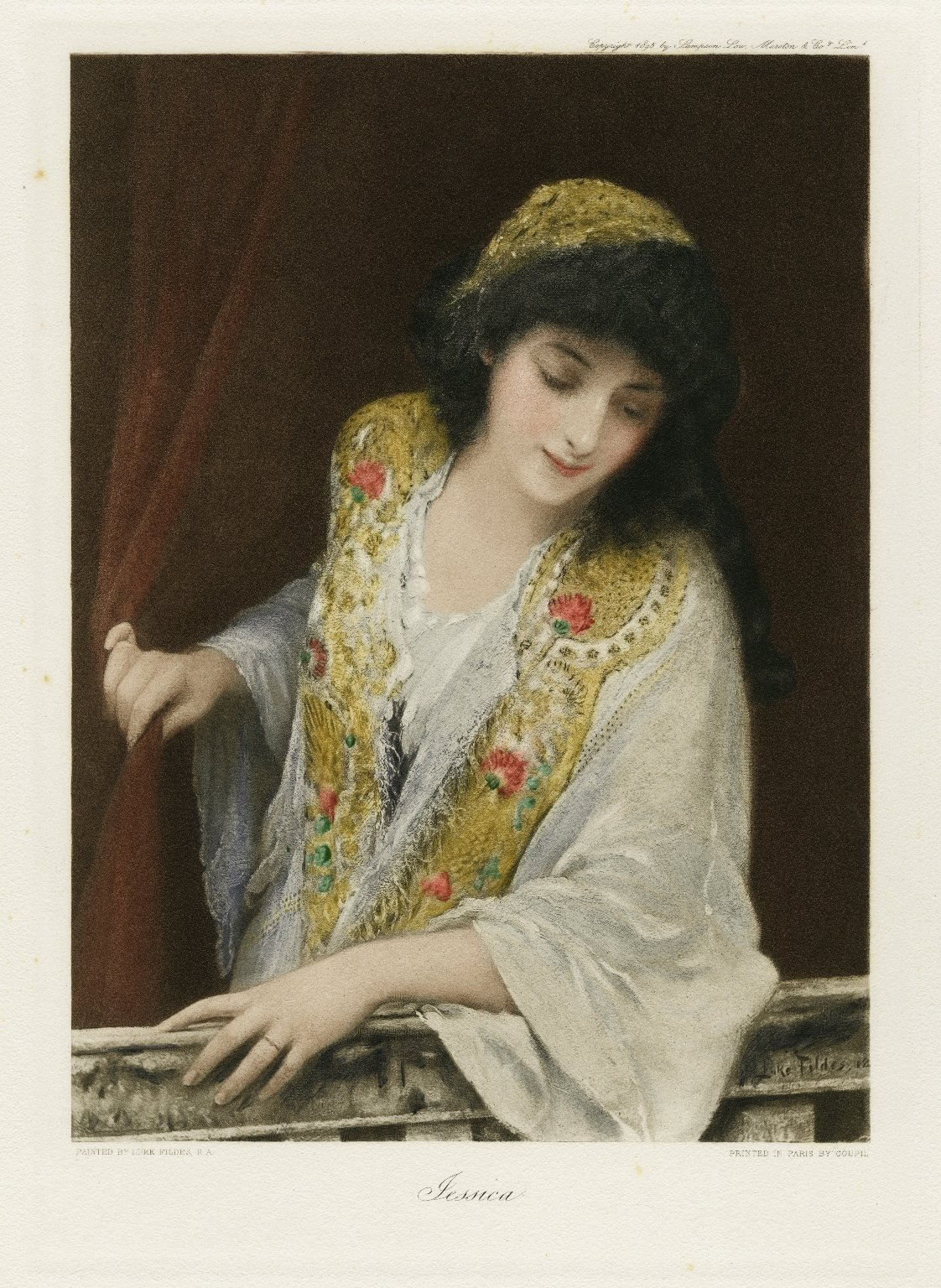
- Jessica (1888), by Luke Fildes
- First appearance: The Merchant of Venice; c. 1596–98
- Created by: William Shakespeare
- Portrayed by: Boy players (Original Elizabethan version); Edna Maison; Lia Eibenschütz; Liliana Tellini; Annette Andre; Leslee Udwin

In-universe information
- Family: Shylock (father); Leah (mother, deceased)
- Spouse: Lorenzo
- Religion: Judaism, later converts to Catholicism
- Nationality: Venetian

Jessica is the daughter of Shylock, a Jewish moneylender, in William Shakespeare's The Merchant of Venice (c. 1598). In the play, she elopes with Lorenzo, a penniless Christian, and a chest of her father's money, eventually ending up in Portia and Bassanio's household. In the play's dramatic structure, Jessica is a minor but pivotal role. Her actions motivate Shylock's vengeful insistence on his "pound of flesh" from Antonio; her relationships with Lorenzo and Shylock serve as a mirror and contrast to Portia's with Bassanio and with her father; her conversion to Christianity is the end of Shylock's line's adherence to the Jewish faith.

Literary critics have historically viewed the character negatively, highlighting her theft of her father's gold, her betrayal of his trust, and apparently selfish motivations and aimless behaviour. Since the end of the 20th century their views have been more moderate and nuanced, pointing to an alternative reading that allows her actions to be motivated by love and generosity, and being driven by Shylock's own tyrannical and immoral behaviour.

== Role in the play ==
Alack, what heinous sin is it in me
To be ashamed to be my father's child?
But though I am a daughter to his blood,
I am not to his manners. O Lorenzo,
If thou keep promise, I shall end this strife,
Become a Christian and thy loving wife.

— Jessica, The Merchant of Venice

The central plot of The Merchant of Venice is relatively straightforward: Antonio borrows money from Shylock to help his friend, Bassanio, court Portia, but, through misfortune, is unable to repay and is subjected to an onerous default (a literal "pound of flesh" cut from his body). In addition, the play contains subplots regarding Bassanio's courtship of Portia; (Note: Often called the Casket plot from the three caskets of gold, silver, and lead between which Portia's suitors must choose, and choose correctly, to win her hand in marriage.) Launcelot Gobbo's humorous interactions with his father, and his change of allegiance from Shylock to Portia and Bassanio; and Jessica and Lorenzo's elopement, with Shylock's savings, his casket of ducats. (Note: Often called the Jessica—Lorenzo plot.)

The role of Jessica is a relatively minor one. She speaks a grand total of 660 words over the play's five acts. (Note: Compared to the 4599 words spoken by Portia, 2881 by Shylock, and 2593 by Bassanio. Jessica's lines amount to c. 3% of the play's text by word count; far fewer than comparable Shakespearean heroines like Rosalind in As You Like It (5679, c. 26%), Julia in The Two Gentlemen of Verona (2430, c. 14%), and Hermia in A Midsummer Night's Dream (1284, c. 8%).) In the dramatic structure of the play, the role is, however, pivotal: her elopement with Lorenzo, taking her father's casket of gold ducats, motivates Shylock's vengefulness towards Antonio; she serves as a mirror highlighting the differences between Shylock's Jewish household and Portia's Christian one; and serves as the means by which Shylock is forcibly converted to Christianity.

I am sorry thou wilt leave my father so.
Our house is hell and thou, a merry devil,
Didst rob it of some taste of tediousness.

— Jessica, The Merchant of Venice

Her first appearance on stage is in act 2, scene 3, in a brief scene with Launcelot Gobbo. Gobbo is leaving Shylock's service to give his allegiance to Bassanio, and Jessica bemoans the loss of his company in a household that is "hell". She speeds him along, to avoid her father seeing their interaction, with a gold ducat as a parting gift and a letter to Lorenzo. After Gobbo leaves, she muses to herself on what flaws are in her character that makes her ashamed to be her father's daughter, and that although she is related to him by blood she is alienated by his behaviour. She concludes the soliloquy determined to marry Lorenzo and convert to Christianity.

Hear you me, Jessica,
Lock up my doors, and when you hear the drum
And the vile squealing of the wry-necked fife,
Clamber not you up to the casements then,
Nor thrust your head into the public street
To gaze on Christian fools with varnished faces,
But stop my house's ears (I mean my casements).
Let not the sound of shallow fopp'ry enter
My sober house.

— Shylock, The Merchant of Venice

In act 2, scene 4, Gobbo bears the letter, containing Jessica's plans to elope with Lorenzo and as much of her father's valuables as she can find, to Lorenzo. He is pleased by the letter and its contents, and bids Gobbo return to let her know that he has received the letter and will not fail her. In act 2, scene 5, however, Gobbo is intercepted by Shylock, who berates him for his change of allegiance. Gobbo seizes on Shylock's repeated mentions of Jessica's name as a pretense to call her. When she arrives, Shylock gives her the keys to his house and the responsibility of keeping it safe while he dines with Antonio and Bassanio. Upon learning there will be a masquerade, he enjoins her to shutter the windows and not "gaze on Christian fools with varnished faces". He then bids Gobbo precede him to let Antonio and Bassanio know he will attend their dinner. Having no other option, Gobbo whispers to Jessica to "look out at window for all this. / There will come a Christian by / Will be worth a Jewess' eye." before leaving. Shylock catches the interaction and asks Jessica what Gobbo said, but Jessica deceives him and claims he was simply saying goodbye. Shylock then complains of Gobbo's sloth and vociferous appetite, claiming he is well rid of him and glad he now serves Bassanio, whom he dislikes. He leaves for the dinner, and Jessica soliloquises:

Farewell, and if my fortune be not crossed,
I have a father, you a daughter, lost.

— Jessica, The Merchant of Venice

I am glad 'tis night, you do not look on me,
For I am much ashamed of my exchange.
But love is blind, and lovers cannot see
The pretty follies that themselves commit,
For if they could, Cupid himself would blush
To see me thus transformèd to a boy.

— Jessica, The Merchant of Venice

In the following scene—act 2, scene 6—Lorenzo and his friends come to Shylock's house, and Jessica greets them from a window, dressed as a boy. She asks Lorenzo to confirm his identity before lowering a casket of her father's ducats. Lorenzo bids her descend, but Jessica demurs, ashamed of her disguise. Lorenzo persuades her, and she goes inside to bring more of Shylock's ducats. Lorenzo praises her to his friends: "For she is wise, if I can judge of her, / And fair she is, if that mine eyes be true, / And true she is, as she hath proved herself. / And therefore, like herself, wise, fair, and true,". She joins them on the street and all but Lorenzo's friend Gratiano leaves. Antonio then arrives to tell Gratiano that the winds are propitious for sailing and that Bassanio is leaving immediately for Belmont to woo Portia. Gratiano expresses his desire to leave the city immediately.

Jessica next appears at Belmont in act 3, scene 2, accompanying Lorenzo and Salerio, a messenger delivering a letter to Bassanio from Antonio. The letter informs him that all Antonio's business ventures have failed, such that he has defaulted on the bond to Shylock, and that Shylock intends to collect on the "pound of flesh". Jessica informs them that she has heard her father speaking with his fellows, saying he "would rather have Antonio's flesh / Than twenty times the value of the sum / That he did owe him." Portia dispatches Bassanio to Venice to assist his friend, pausing only long enough for them to be married. Then announces that she and Nerissa, her maid, will stay in a nearby convent while their husbands are away. In her absence she asks Lorenzo and Jessica to manage her estate.

In act 3, scene 5, Jessica and Gobbo banter in the gardens of Belmont; Gobbo claiming that she is tainted by the sins of her father, and she can only hope that she was an illegitimate child and not actually related to Shylock. Jessica protests that then she would be visited by the sins of her mother, and Gobbo concurs that she would be damned either way. Jessica argues that she has been saved by her husband who has converted her to Christianity, to which Gobbo replies that Lorenzo is contributing to the raised price of pork by the conversion of Jews (who may not eat pork) to Christians (who do). Lorenzo joins them and Jessica recounts their conversation, leading to further banter between Lorenzo and Gobbo, until Gobbo leaves to prepare for dinner. In response to questioning by Lorenzo, Jessica praises Portia as great and peerless.

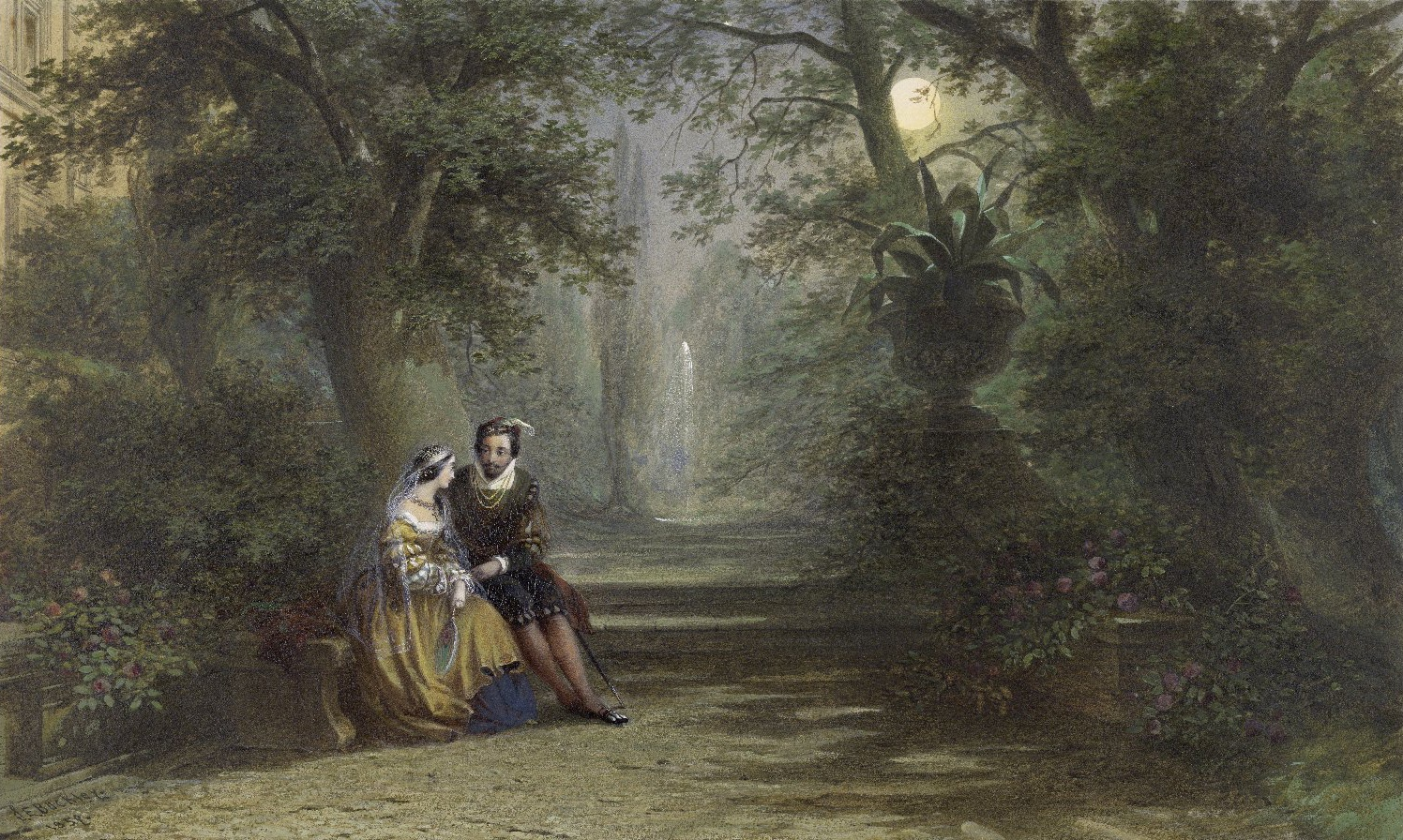
The moon shines bright (1859); watercolor on paper by John Edmund Buckley (1820–1884)

Act 5, scene 1—the final scene of the play, and following on from the courtroom scene in act 4—opens with Jessica and Lorenzo strolling in the gardens of Belmont. They exchange romantic metaphors, invoking in turn characters from classical literature: Troilus and Criseyde, Pyramus and Thisbe, Aeneas and Dido, Jason and Medea, and finally themselves in the same mode, until they are interrupted by Stephano, a messenger. No sooner has Stephano informed them that Portia and Nerissa will soon arrive than Gobbo comes with the same news for Bassanio and Gratiano. They decide to await the arrivals in the gardens, and ask Stephano to fetch his instrument and play for them.

The man that hath no music in himself,
Nor is not moved with concord of sweet sounds,
Is fit for treasons, stratagems, and spoils;

— Lorenzo, The Merchant of Venice

Portia and Nerissa enter, followed shortly by Bassanio, Antonio, and Gratiano. After they are all reunited, Nerissa hands Lorenzo a deed of gift from Shylock, won in the trial, giving Jessica all of his wealth upon his death.

== Character sources ==
The generally accepted sources for The Merchant of Venice are Giovanni Fiorentino's Il Pecorone (c. 1380s) and Richard Robinson's English translation of the Gesta Romanorum (1577), but neither of these contain the Jessica–Lorenzo plot, nor give their Shylock-analogues a daughter. For these elements Shakespeare probably mined Masuccio Salernitano's Il Novellino (1476) and Christopher Marlowe's The Jew of Malta (c. 1590).

In the 14th story of Il Novellino we have most of the elements of the Jessica–Lorenzo plot: a daughter guarded by a rich but miserly father; the lovers eloping with her father's gold and jewels; the father's despair, in equal measures, for the loss of both daughter and treasure; and the lovers' eventual marriage and happiness.

For the Jessica–Shylock relationship, John Drakakis, the editor of the Arden Shakespeare's third series edition, highlights the verbal connection between The Merchant of Venice and The Jew of Malta with Barabas's words when Abigail rescues his gold and Shylock's at Jessica's theft of his Ducats.

O my girl,

My gold, my fortune, my felicity, …

O girl, O gold, O beauty, O my bliss! (Hugs his bags.)

— Barabas, The Jew of Malta
Translation:

My daughter! O, my ducats! O, my daughter!

Fled with a Christian! O, my Christian ducats!

Justice, the law, my ducats, and my daughter,

— Shylock, The Merchant of Venice

Another version of the play's plot can be found in Anthony Munday's Zelauto: The Fountain of Fame Erected in an Orchard of Amorous Adventures (1580). In this version it is Munday's Jessica analogue, Brisana, who pleads the case first in the courtroom scene, followed by Cornelia, the Portia analogue.

But the Jessica–Lorenzo plot ultimately stems from medieval archetypal plots and characters. The Christian in love with a Jewess appears frequently in exemplum from the 13th to the 15th century. Beatrice D. Brown, in her 1929 article, "Mediaeval Prototypes of Lorenzo and Jessica", finds the most direct match in "… MS. Royal 7 D. 1, a collection of theological pieces probably compiled by a Dominican friar at or near Cambridge in the thirteenth century." It contains a spendthrift Christian lover, the fair Jewess, the rich old father, the lovers robbing the father, and the father's conflicted grief over his daughter's betrayal and the loss of his treasure. However, in this story the Christian lover flees alone with the treasure.

Writing two decades later, James L. Wilson finds a better parallel in The Sultan of Babylon, an English story rooted in The Matter of France and the chanson de geste The Song of Roland. Here Laban—the Sultan of Babylon, a Saracen ruler—captures the Christian knights Oliver and Roland and intends to execute them. His daughter, Floripas, proceeds to murder her governess for refusing to help feed the prisoners; bashes the jailer's head in with his keychain when he refuses to let her see the prisoners; manipulates her father into giving her responsibility for them; brings them to her tower, and treats them as royalty; does the same for the remaining ten of the Twelve Peers when they are captured too; helps the Peers murder Sir Lucafere, King of Baldas when he surprises them; urges the Peers to attack her father and his knights at supper to cover up the murder; when her father escapes and attacks the Peers in her tower, she assists in the defence; then she converts to Christianity and is betrothed to Guy of Burgundy; and finally, she and her brother, Fierabras decide that there is no point trying to convert their father to Christianity so he should be executed instead. All this is justified to the audience simply because Floripas converts to Christianity and Laban is a Saracene:

The reason for the cruelty of the Sultan's two children is quite obvious. In the romances there are two sides: the 'good' or Christian side, and the 'bad' or Saracen side. Once Floripas and Ferumbras had joined the 'good' side, they had to become implacable enemies of the Sultan. There was no question of filial duty or filial love; one was either a Saracen or a Christian, and that was all there was to it. There is not any other moral standard for the characters.

Wilson concludes that since The Merchant of Venice was a comedy, and since its audience would be used to the conventions of medieval tales, an Elizabethan audience would not be overly concerned with Jessica's filial piety. "Like Floripas and Ferumbras and dozens of other medieval heathens she turned Christian, and that was obviously, and conventionally, the best possible thing she could do."

=== Name ===
The name "Jessica" was unknown until Shakespeare invented it; it is believed to derive from the Biblical Iscah (Yīskā, Iesca, Iescha), a niece of Abraham. In the First Folio the name was spelled Iessica, as "J" and "I" were not distinguished at the time.

== Critical history ==
Literary critics have historically viewed the character negatively, highlighting her theft of her father's gold, her betrayal of his trust, and her apparently selfish motivations and aimless behaviour. In her 1980 survey, "In Defense of Jessica: The Runaway Daughter in The Merchant of Venice", Camille Slights calls out Arthur Quiller-Couch's opinion in the 1926 The Cambridge Dover Wilson Shakespeare as an extreme but representative example:

In the interim between the signing of the bond and its falling due this daughter, this Jessica, has wickedly and most unfilially betrayed him. … Jessica is bad and disloyal, unfilial, a thief; frivolous, greedy, without any more conscience than a cat and without even a cat's redeeming love of home. Quite without heart, on worse than an animal instinct—pilfering to be carnal—she betrays her father to be a light-of-lucre carefully weighted with her sire's ducats.

Slights sees this as a consequence of sympathetic readings of Shylock, where the play is seen primarily as exposing Christian hypocrisy, and his actions merely natural responses to ostracism and prejudice. In such a reading Jessica's actions amount to abandoning her father and betraying him to his enemies. By the last half of the 20th century this "sentimentally sympathetic reading" was starting to be rejected, but without a corresponding reassessment of Jessica. She was still viewed as inhabiting primarily negative values, in contrast with the positive values associated with Portia, Bassanio, and Antonio. Writing in 1977, Raymond B. Waddington thinks that:

The relationship of Jessica and Lorenzo to the primary lovers, Portia and Bassanio, consistently is contrastive and negative: they undergo no tests of character or faith; they are obedient to no bonds; they take all, rather than giving all; they hazard nothing.

Slights contradicts this view, pointing out that it conflicts with "a natural audience response" and argues that "we must question judgments that deny the most obvious emotional force of Shakespearean plots and characters." Shakespeare's plays usually extend and deepen existing dramatic conventions, and Jessica must be seen in a context of classical and Elizabethan conventions for such characters. Slights highlights comedies where children rebel against a miserly father, or romances where daughters defy a repressive father for love. These conventions would be familiar for both Shakespeare and an Elizabethan theatre audience, and, indeed, modern audiences tend to accept Jessica's actions as natural within the context of the plot. Her escape from Shylock's repressive household to Belmont a quest for freedom, and from misfortune to happiness.

This view is supported by John Russell-Brown, the editor of the 1955 Arden Shakespeare second series edition of the play: "... nowhere in the play does Shylock show any tenderness towards his daughter ... as a Jewess, loved by a Christian, Jessica stood in a fair way for the audience's sympathy ..." In Munday's Zelauto, Brisana (Jessica) opposes her father, Trinculo (Shylock), and eventually elopes with Rodolpho (Lorenzo); all presented sympathetically for the audience. Similarly, in Salernitano's 14th novella, the daughter makes off with her father's money, to the same effect. "In both these examples, the father is avaricious ... It ranks him with the miserly fathers in Elizabethan and classical comedies, who are only fit to be dupes of their children ..."

== 18th-century editors ==
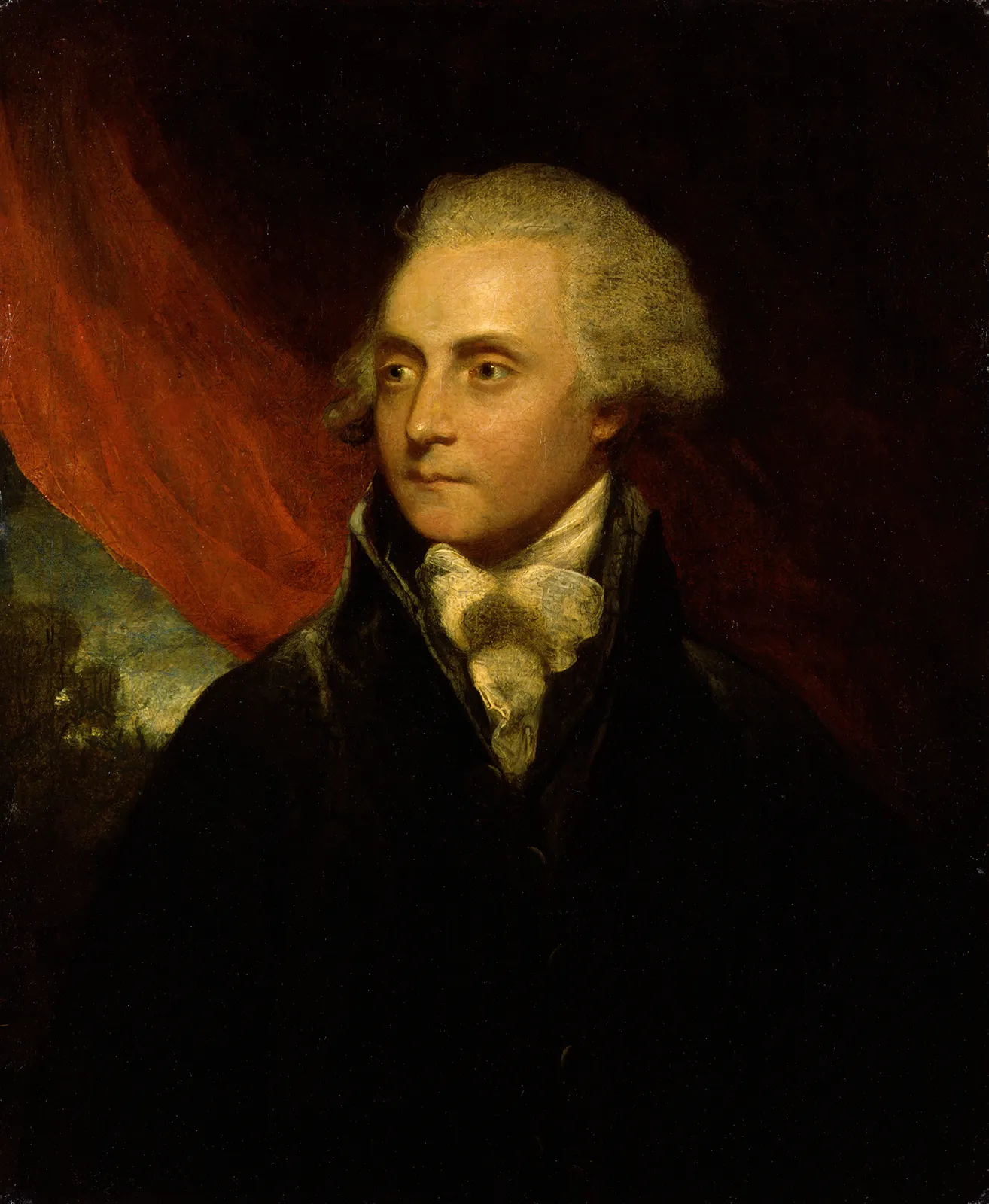
Edmond Malone's The Plays and Poems of William Shakspeare (1790) was the first truly scholarly edition of Shakespeare's works.

The first critical notice of Jessica in the 18th century was made by William Warburton, who commented on the line in act 5, scene 1: "Fair ladies, you drop manna in the way / Of starvèd people." Warburton's comment was that "Shakespear is not more exact in any thing, than in adapting his images with propriety to his speakers; of which he has here given an instance in making the young Jewess call good fortune, Manna." Unfortunately, as Samuel Johnson explains rather drily—in a note to Warburton's note—in his 1765 edition: "The commentator should have remarked, that this speech is not, even in his own edition, the speech of the Jewess." The lines in question are usually assigned to Lorenzo.

The next was by Edmond Malone in his 1790 edition. The editor of the Second Folio (1632) had emended the line "If a Christian do not / play the knave and get thee, I am much deceived", substituting did for do. This changed the meaning, as an acerbic Malone points out:

I should not have attempted to explain so easy a passage, if the ignorant editor of the second folio, thinking probably that the word get must necessarily mean beget, had not altered the text, and substituted did in the place of do, the reading of all the old and authentick editions; in which he has been copied by every subsequent editor. Launcelot is not talking about Jessica's father, but about her future husband. I am aware that, in a subsequent scene, he says to Jessica, 'Marry, you may partly hope your father got you not;' but he is now on another subject.

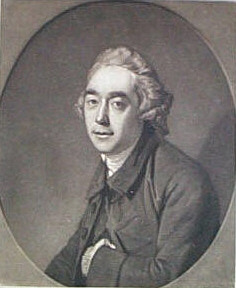
George Steevens, although originally on friendly terms with Malone, pursued a feud with the younger scholar and often enlisted his friends to help.

Malone's position turned out to be somewhat controversial. In his revised edition in 1821, (Note: Malone died in 1812, so his revised edition was published posthumously by James Boswell the younger, the son of his good friend and Johnson's famous biographer, James Boswell the elder. Malone and the younger Boswell had been close since the latter was a youth, and grew closer yet after the elder Boswell's death. He was Malone's literary executor, and edited the material Malone had left behind into a major new variorum edition; often called the Third Variorum.) multiple notes appeared in response. The first, by George Steevens, offers an alternate reading of the passage: "I suspect that the waggish Launcelot designed this for a broken sentence—'and get thee'—implying, get thee with child. Mr. Malone, however, supposes him to mean only—carry thee away from thy father's house." As does another by John Monck Mason: (Note: Mason was an Irish politician and literary scholar, and on friendly terms with Steevens who had used many of Mason's notes in his editions. At the time Malone's first edition was published in 1790, Malone and Steevens were quarrelling and competing for primacy as the editor of Shakespeare.)

Notwithstanding Mr. Malone charges the editor of the second folio so strongly with ignorance, I have no doubt but that did is the true reading, as it is clearly better sense than that which he has adopted. Launcelot does not mean to foretell the fate of Jessica, but judges, from her lovely disposition, that she must have been begotten by a christian, not by such a brute as Shylock: a christian might marry her without playing the knave, though he could not beget her.

Boswell printed both along with Malone's original note. At further issue was Malone's tarring of all the previous editors with the same brush, for which Steevens was particularly sore. (Note: Steevens had acted as somewhat of a mentor to Malone when the latter first came to London; he took advantage of the younger scholar's diligence and research, but he also provided Malone with connections and legitimacy in learned circles, and gave him the opportunity to establish his reputation as a scholar of Shakespeare. When Malone published his own edition, somewhat in competition with Steevens' own, and criticised those who had come before him, Steevens took it particularly personally.) He provided a further note exempting Isaac Reed from Malone's criticism on the grounds that Reed had followed the First Folio, not the Second. Malone's response was simply that "In answer to Mr. Steevens, I have to state that I printed this play in 1784, and that Mr. Reed's edition did not appear till 1785. I may add that I communicated to that gentleman this very correction."

The back and forth continued in notes on Jessica's line in act 5, scene 1: "I am never merry when I hear sweet music." Steevens opined that:

In the age of Shakspeare it is probable that some shade of meaning (at present undeterminable,) was occasionally affixed to the words sweet and sweetness. ... If ... Jessica only employs the term sweet in one of its common senses, it seems inadequate to the effects assigned to it; ...

For this point, Steevens cites the word's use in Measure for Measure and a similar usage of dulcia by Horace in his Art of Poetry. Malone responds that "Sweet is pleasing, delightful, and such is the meaning of dulcis in Horace."

== Different iterations ==
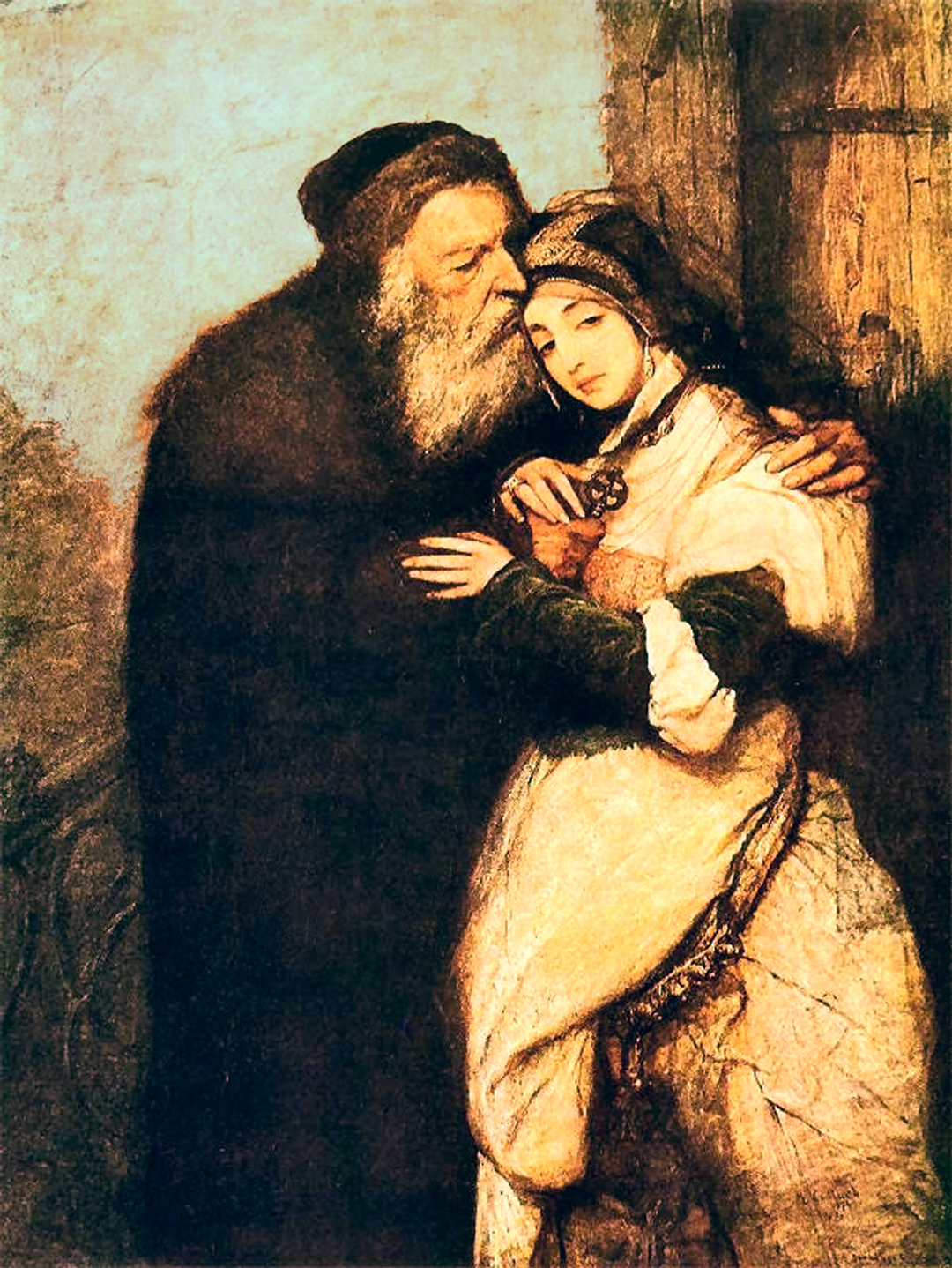
Shylock and Jessica

In John Greer St. Ervine's 1924 sequel to The Merchant of Venice, The Lady of Belmont, Jessica is portrayed as a lascivious woman of weak character.

In Nazi Germany, Jessica was altered to be Shylock's Goyish ward, as the marriage between her and Lorenzo contradicted Nazi ideals of racial purity.

== Notes and references ==
=== References ===
All references to The Merchant of Venice, unless otherwise specified, are taken from the Folger Shakespeare Library's Folger Digital Texts edition. Under their referencing system, acts, scenes, and lines are marked in the text, so 2.6.34–40 would be act 2, scene 6, lines 34 through 40.

=== Sources ===
- Brown, Beatrice D. (1929). "Mediaeval Prototypes of Lorenzo and Jessica". Modern Language Notes. 44 (4). Johns Hopkins University Press: 227–32. doi:10.2307/2913111. ISSN 0149-6611. JSTOR 2913111.
- Drakakis, John, ed. (2010). "The Merchant of Venice". Arden Shakespeare, third series. Bloomsbury. doi:10.5040/9781408160398.00000006. ISBN 9781903436813 – via Bloomsbury Drama Online.
- Gill, Roma, ed. (1995). The Jew of Malta. The Complete Works of Christopher Marlowe. Vol. IV. Oxford: Oxford University Press. ISBN 978-0198127703.
- Halio, Jay L., ed. (2008) [first published 1993]. The Merchant of Venice. The Oxford Shakespeare. Oxford: Oxford University Press. ISBN 978-0199535859.
- Johnson, Samuel, ed. (1765). The Plays of William Shakespeare. Vol. 1. London: J. and R. Tonson. LCCN 12010247.
- Malone, Edmond, ed. (1790). The Plays and Poems of William Shakspeare. Vol. 3. London: J. Rivington and Sons. OCLC 503848883. OL 362627W.
- Malone, Edmond; Boswell, James, eds. (1821). The Plays and Poems of William Shakspeare. Vol. V. London: F.C. and J. Rivington. LCCN 15003919. OCLC 503849680. OL 25666266M.
- Mowat, Barbara; Werstine, Paul; Poston, Michael; Niles, Rebecca, eds. (n.d.). "The Merchant of Venice". Folger Digital Texts. Folger Shakespeare Library.
- Quiller-Couch, Arthur; Wilson, J. Dover, eds. (2010) [first published 1926]. The Merchant of Venice. The Cambridge Dover Wilson Shakespeare. Vol. 21. Cambridge: Cambridge University Press. doi:10.1017/CBO9780511704277. ISBN 9780511704277 – via Cambridge Core.
- Russell-Brown, John, ed. (1955). The Merchant of Venice. Arden Shakespeare, second series. Vol. 20. Cengage Learning. ISBN 9781903436035.
- Slights, Camille (1980). "In Defense of Jessica: The Runaway Daughter in The Merchant of Venice". Shakespeare Quarterly. 31 (3). Folger Shakespeare Library: 357–68. doi:10.2307/2869199. eISSN 1538-3555. ISSN 0037-3222. JSTOR 2869199.
- Waddington, Raymond B. (1977). "Blind Gods: Fortune, Justice, and Cupid in the Merchant of Venice". ELH. 44 (3). The Johns Hopkins University Press: 458–77. doi:10.2307/2872568. eISSN 1080-6547. ISSN 0013-8304. JSTOR 2872568.
- Wilson, James L. (1948). "Another Medieval Parallel to the Jessica and Lorenzo Story". The Shakespeare Association Bulletin. 23 (1). Folger Shakespeare Library: 20–3. ISSN 0270-8604. JSTOR 23675223.
