= Shurlock =

Shurlock is a surname. Notable people with the surname include:

- Art Shurlock (1937–2022), American gymnast
- Geoffrey Shurlock (1894–1976), British-American motion picture industry executive

== See also ==
- Shurlock Row, a village in Berkshire, England
- Shulock, people with this surname
