= Bassanio =

Fictional character from Shakespeare's "The Merchant of Venice"

- The Merchant of Venice character
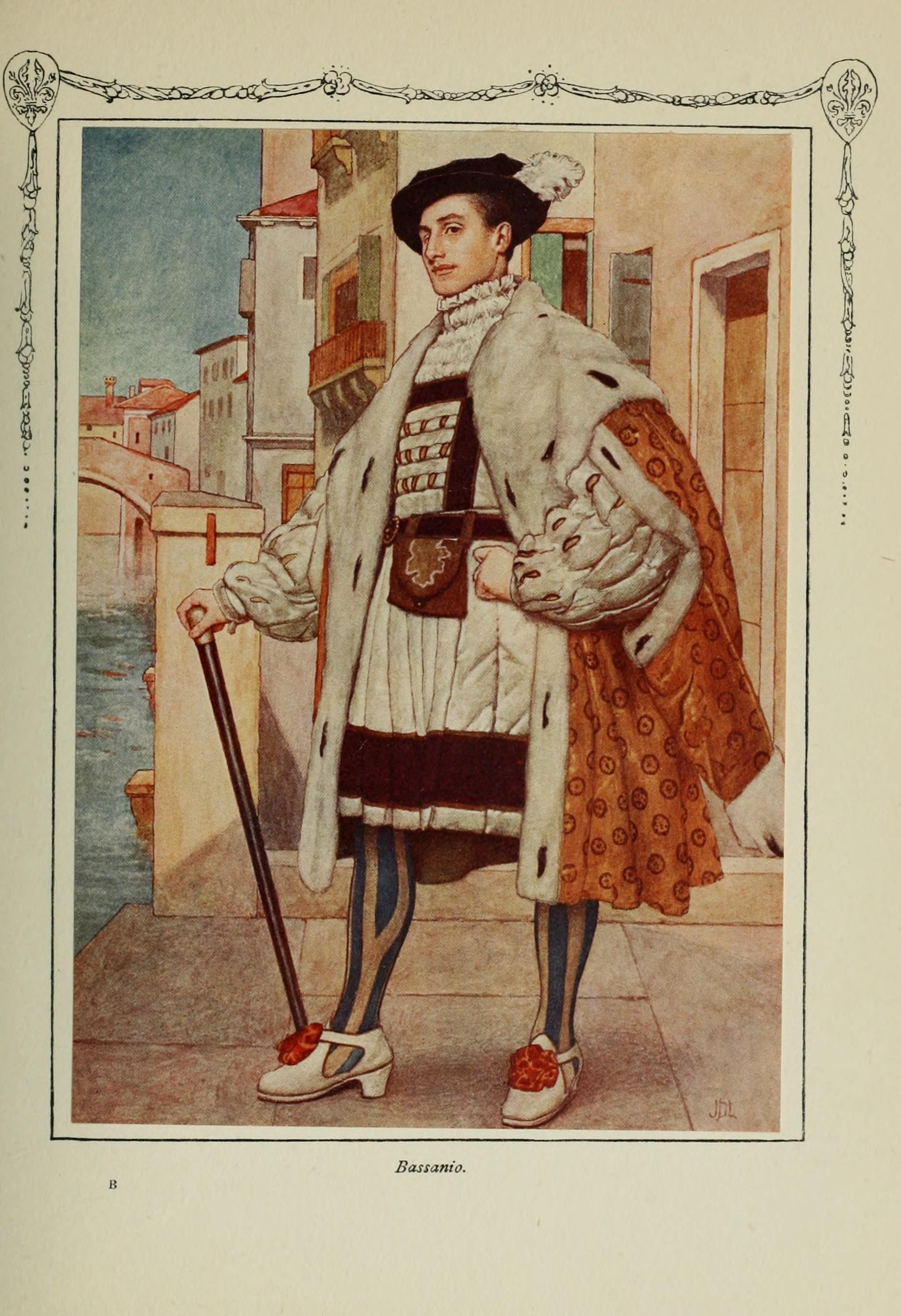
- Portrait by James Dromgole Linton, 1914
- First appearance: The Merchant of Venice; c. 1596–98
- Created by: William Shakespeare
- Portrayed by: Armando Francioli; Douglas Gerrard

In-universe information
- Occupation: None, a poor nobleman
- Family: Antonio (cousin)
- Significant other: Portia
- Religion: Catholic
- Nationality: Venetian

Bassanio is a fictional character in Shakespeare's The Merchant of Venice, the best friend of the main character, Antonio. Bassanio is a spendthrift who wasted all of his money in order to be seen as a respectable man. To regain his fortune, he is determined to marry Portia, a wealthy, intelligent heiress of Belmont. In order to ask for her hand in marriage, Bassanio and Antonio enter into an agreement with the usurer Shylock, which ultimately puts Antonio’s life in danger. He has an important role in the play, with 73 lines compared to Antonio's 47 and Portia's 117.

== Role in the play ==
In act 1, scene 1, Bassanio first makes an appearance while Antonio is complaining to his friends about him being sad. Antonio's friends continue to speculate why is he upset, and Antonio asks Bassanio to tell him of the secret love he is hiding. Bassanio explains that he is in love with Portia and needs a loan to show his wealth and power to her. Even though Antonio has no money to give to Bassanio, he still promises to guarantee any loan Bassanio can find.

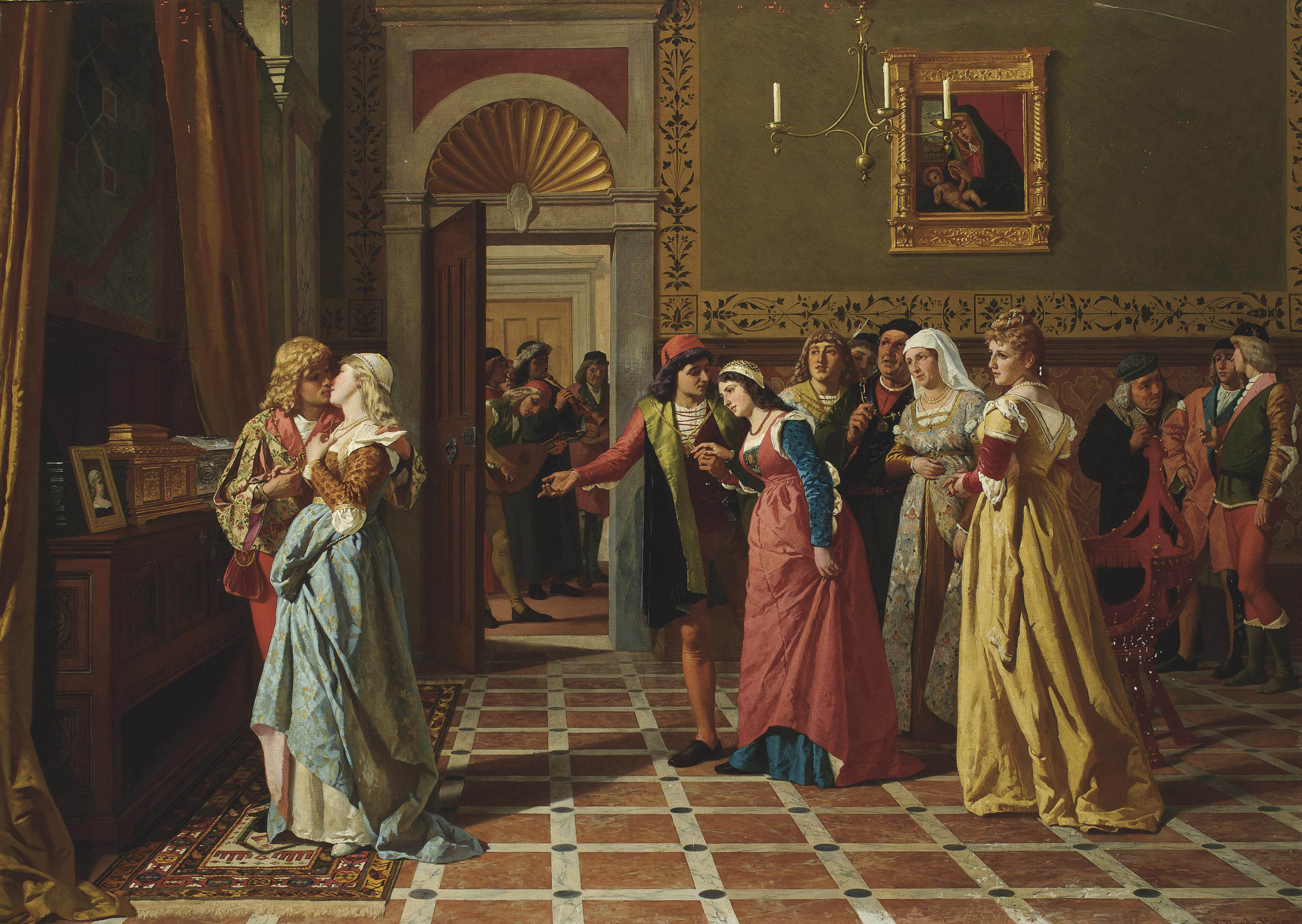
Bassanio wins Portia's heart by finding her portrait; the couple are at far left. (painted by Antonio Ermolao Paoletti)

In act 1, scene 3, Shylock finally agrees to lend Bassanio three thousand ducats they all agree to the loan, Bassanio offers Shylock to eat with him, but he denies the offer on the grounds of eating with Christians. After a long debate about the Jewish versus Christian morality of charging interest on loans, Shylock decides to add a clause that says that if they cannot repay the loan, Antonio will have to give a pound of his flesh.

Bassanio's next appearance comes in act 2, scene 2, just as Launcelot decides that he wants to work for Bassanio. He explains in his reasoning that he can no longer bear working for a Jewish man and would rather work for a Christian man. After this, Gratiano appears and asks Bassanio if he can accompany him to Belmont. Before Bassanio agrees, he ensures that Gratiano will behave himself in front of Portia and the other inhabitants of Belmont.

In act 3, scene 2, Bassanio finally reaches Belmont, and Portia urges him to wait before choosing between the three caskets that determine if he gets to marry her. Bassanio reasons through his choices and decides to choose the casket of lead because it is a humble choice. When he opens the casket, he finds the portrait of Portia inside and realizes he has chosen correctly. Portia also gives Bassanio a ring that she says if he loses it, their love will be doomed. Finally, a letter from Antonio arrives telling Bassanio of the misfortunes of his ships, and it also explains how eager Shylock is to get his end of the bargain. Antonio pleads for Bassanio to see him one last time, and Portia encourages him to go to Venice after they marry.

Act 4, scene 1 is the critical trial scene in which the laws of Venice are put to a test to see if Antonio will truly have to give a pound of his flesh. Shylock is insistent that the bond be held true while the Duke and other characters argue on behalf of Antonio. Bassanio steps in to confront Shylock and offers to pay the sum that is owed or even pay more if that is what Shylock wishes. Shylock refuses, and that is when Portia, disguised as a lawyer, begins to argue the case. She finds a loophole to prevent the deal from following through and save the best friend of her husband. After the trial, Bassanio offers money to Portia (still disguised as a lawyer), which she refuses to take. Instead, she asks him for the ring she gave him. Initially, Bassanio refuses to give up the ring since it was an important gift from his wife, but Antonio convinces him to give it to her.

In act 5, scene 1, Bassanio and Antonio return to Belmont and greet their wives who appear to be angry that they gave their rings away. After much debate and chastising, the women return the rings and reveal that they were indeed the lawyer and clerk that saved Antonio.

== Origins ==
Most scholars agree that the character of Bassanio has his origins from two texts called Gesta Romanorum and Il Pecorone. The origin of the casket plot comes from the Gesta Romanorum. In contrast to the Merchant of Venice, the person who must make the decision is a woman, not a man, and she makes her decision after God's will "not, as Bassanio does, after having reasoned out his choice in the best Renaissance manner". In Il Pecorone, there is a similar plot to the ring plot in the Merchant of Venice, but it only exists between one pair, instead of the two couples in the Merchant of Venice. Additionally, the character that is the Bassanio equivalent does not try to apologize for giving away the ring in Il Pecorone, and those that are involved in the ring plot are father and son, not lovers.

Besides basic plot differences, Shakespeare also added specific character traits to Bassanio that did not exist in these previous sources. The characters in the original texts have an "absence of any details of characterization". Shakespeare added all of Bassanio's good and less desirable characteristics from scratch. Shakespeare also added the monetary aspect of Bassanio's decision to court Portia.

The character's name is believed to derive from the Bassanos, a Venetian family of Jewish ancestry; the musician Anthony Bassano was based in London at the time The Merchant of Venice was written, and Emilia Lanier (née Aemilia Bassano) was a poet at the time, and was possibly Shakespeare's "Dark Lady."

== Analysis ==
=== Relationship ===
The relationship between Bassanio and Antonio is one that has been examined in great detail since the play's first performance in 1605. In older examinations of the play, there is a focus on the friendship between the two. During an early scene in the play, Antonio says to Bassanio that "My purse, my person, my extremest means / Lie all unlocked to your occasions". He continues to show his admiration for Bassanio throughout the play through entering the flesh bond and telling Bassanio that he has no need to explain why he needs monetary assistance. Additionally, he states that "he only loves the world for him" [Bassanio], which to some indicates that "Antonio's primary emotional bond is with Bassanio." Bassanio also reciprocates Antonio's admiration after he realizes that Antonio is willing to die for him. Bassanio says "But life itself, my wife, and all the world / Are not with me esteemed above thy life. / I would lose all—ay, sacrifice them all / Here to this devil—to deliver you". This statement indicated that he would sacrifice his wife, Portia, to save Antonio. However, as the roles of friendship and romance changed over time, in more contemporary analyses of the play, there is a focus on the possible romantic relationship over friendship between Bassanio and Antonio. However, some argue that "Antonio is fueled by a homoerotic passion for Bassanio that would substitute person for purse" which indicates that Bassanio does not fully reciprocate Antonio's love.

=== Mercenary ===
There is much debate between scholars on Bassanio's motivations for marrying Portia. In his first description of Portia, he describes her as "a lady richly left", which to some indicates that he is solely focused on her money. However, one critic argues that his actions are fully justified under Elizabethan standards. They argue that it was natural for young gentlemen, such as Bassanio, at the time to marry for wealth since a large part of their identity was to be able to live a life of luxury. Additionally, some argue that this comment cannot be taken to mean his actual feelings since he is speaking to Antonio in order to obtain a loan to marry Portia. In contrast to the idea that he is a mercenary for solely focusing on Portia's money, some argue that he truly loves her for her beauty. Some scholars argue that Bassanio has a change of heart during his travels to Belmont saying that his confessions of love to Portia after the casket scene are truly what he feels.

== Portrayals ==
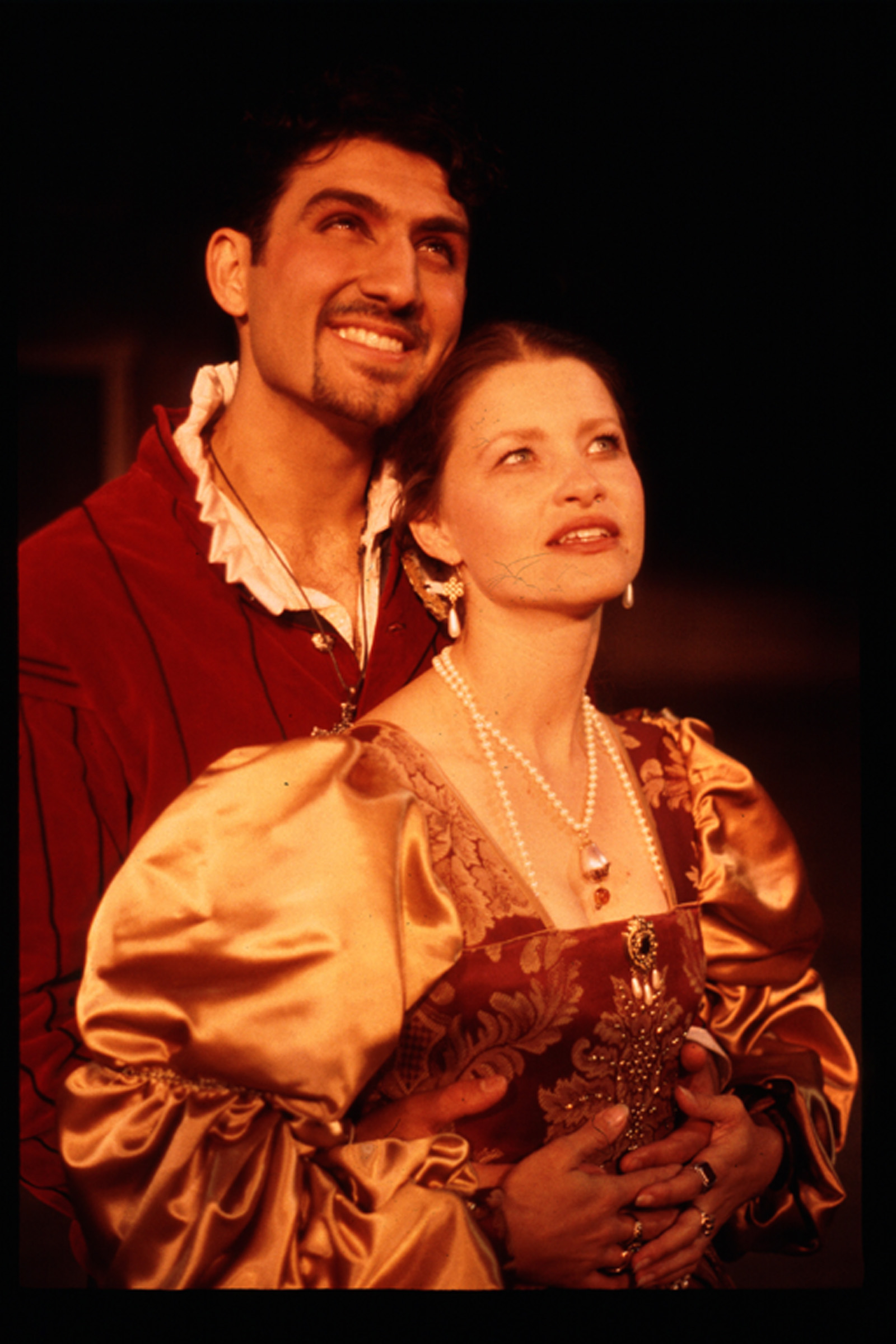
Bassanio and Portia, Pacific Repertory Theatre, 1995

=== Stage ===
The first known performance of The Merchant of Venice was at the court of James II in 1605.

Clifford Williams directed a 1965 production of the play that suggested for the first time that there could be an implication of homosexuality between Antonio and Bassanio.

In a 1987 production of the play directed by Bill Alexander, portrayed a very romantic relationship between Bassanio and Antonio in which they kiss at the end of scene 1.

At the Royal Shakespeare Company in 1997, a slight change is made to the character of Bassanio in which he spills out gold coins at the end of the trial scene which remain there for the entirety of the play reminding the audience of the underlying motivations of wealth.

=== Film ===
An early production of The Merchant of Venice was made in 1914 with Douglas Gerrard as Bassanio.

In 1923 a German adaption of The Merchant of Venice was made called the Jew of Mestri with Harry Liedtke as Bassanio. This adaptation attempts to make Shakespeare's play more similar to Il Pecorone, one of the inspirations for The Merchant of Venice; however, Bassanio's character is very similar to the Shakespeare version. One major difference is that in the film is that the characters in the German version have the same names as the Shakespeare characters, but in the American version the names are changed to the names in Il Pecorone. For example, Bassanio's character in the American version is called Giannetto.

In 1947, a made for TV movie was produced by George More O'Ferrall where André Morell plays Bassanio.

In 1953, an Italian version called Le Marchand de Venise was made that cast Armando Francioli as Bassanio.

Anthony Ainley played Bassanio in a 1969 Orson Welles film called The Merchant of Venice, but the footage was lost and the movie was never finished.

Bassanio is played by Jeremy Brett in a 1973 TV movie of the play.

John Nettles played Bassanio in a 1980 TV movie of The Merchant of Venice.

In a 1996 made for TV movie production, Paul McGann portrayed Bassanio.

In 2004, Joseph Fiennes played Bassanio in the film titled The Merchant of Venice. In a review by Roger Ebert, he expresses his opinion that this film adaptation makes clear the implication that Antonio is in love Bassanio. Additionally, he examines Bassanio's relationship with Portia and whether his love for her is genuine.

=== Literature ===
In 1996, A. R. Gurney published a sequel to The Merchant of Venice called Overtime: A Modern Sequel to the Merchant of Venice. This sequel further explores the relationships between the characters with alternative traits. In this book, the backgrounds of the characters are changed, and it is revealed that Bassanio is of Irish descent, and Antonio is gay.
