= Giovanni Fiorentino =

14th-century Italian writer

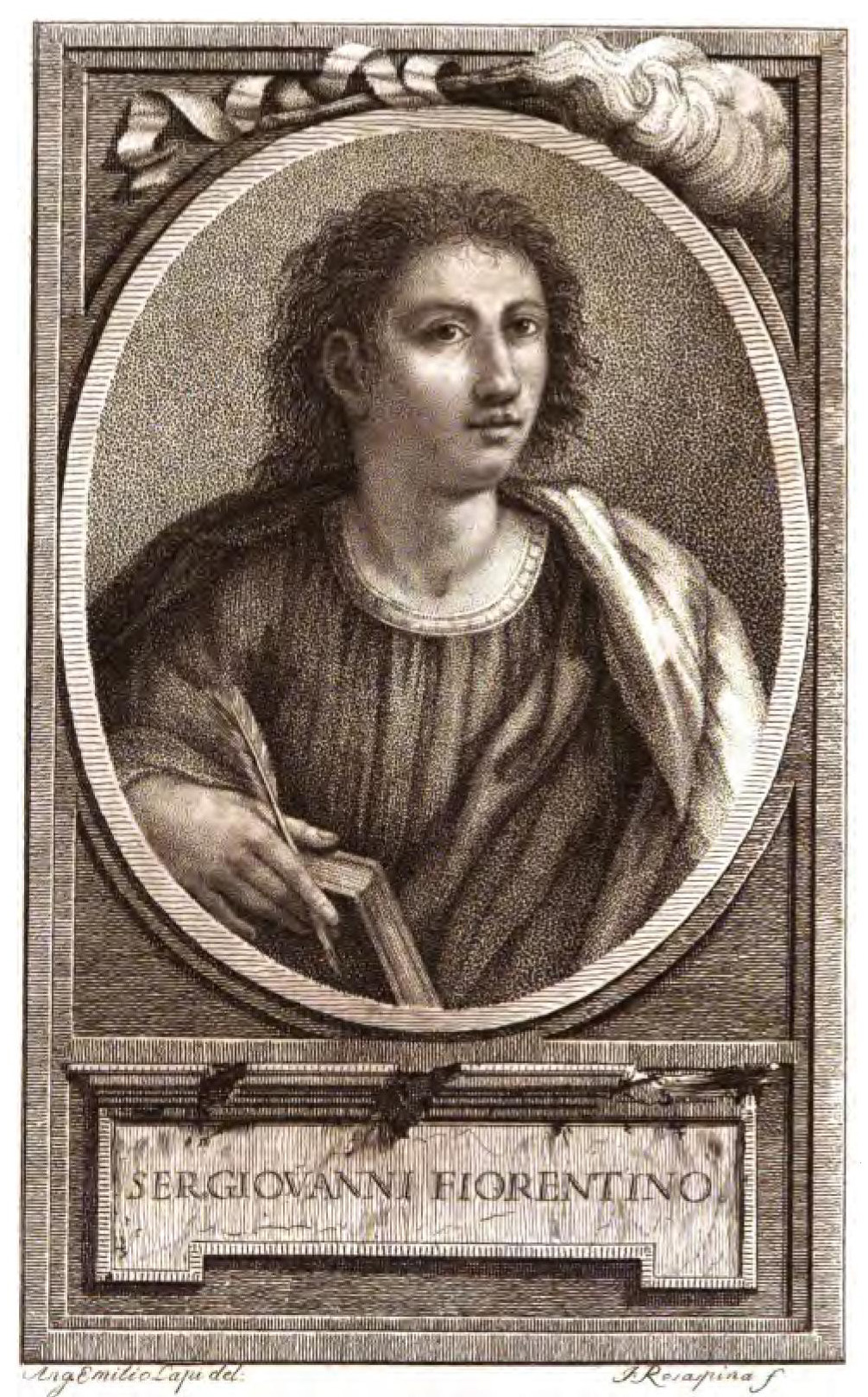
Giovanni Fiorentino

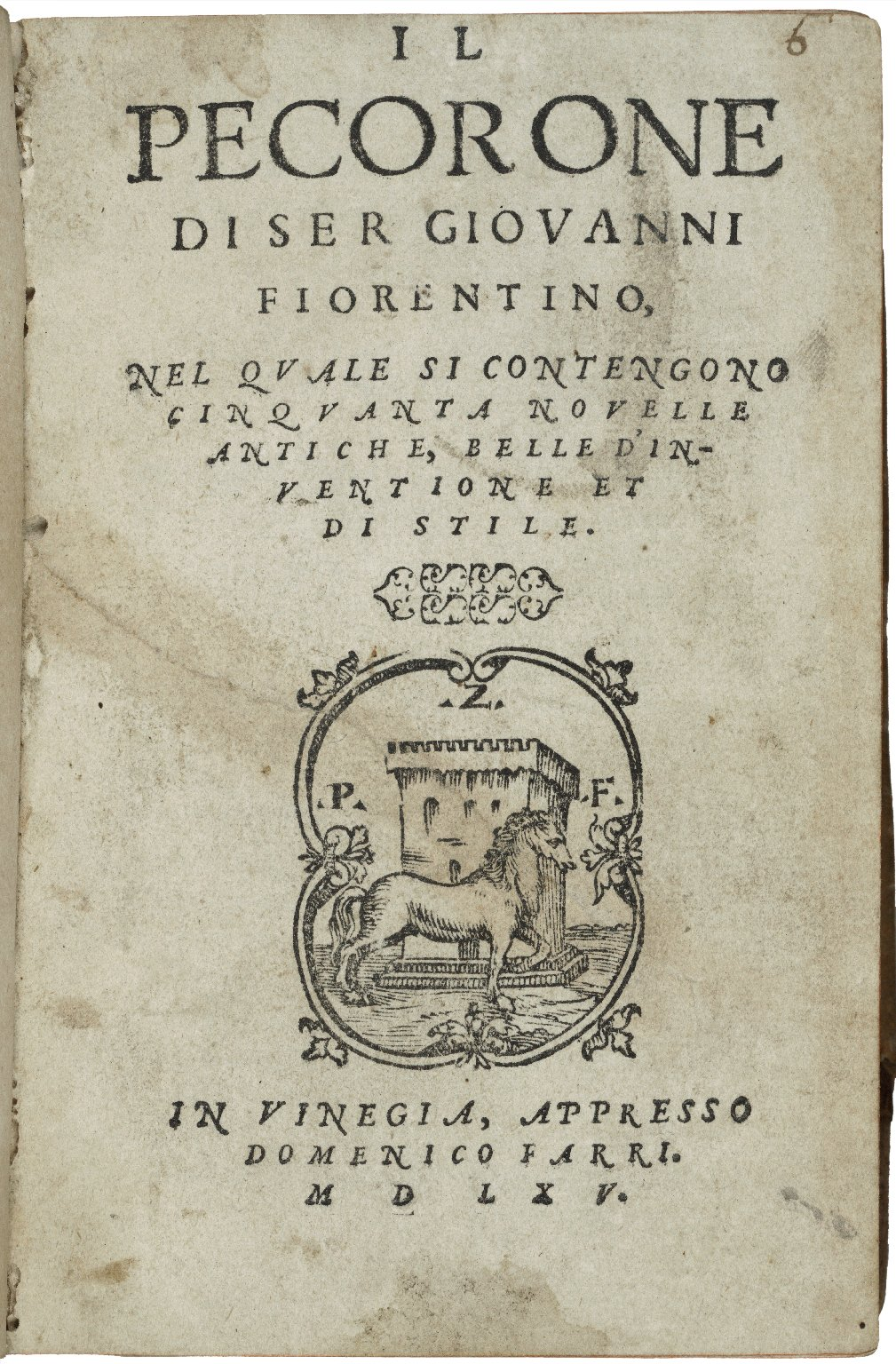
Title page (1565) of Il Pecorone

Giovanni Fiorentino was a 14th-century Florentine writer, to whom is attributed the work Il Pecorone ("The Simpleton"). This was a collection of short stories, purportedly published in 1378. However, this date is disputed.

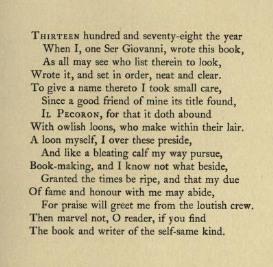
Title sonnet of Il Pecorone

The attribution, given in the opening sonnet accompanying the collection, is supposed to be spurious although it is mostly retained for convenience.

== Biography ==
Ser Giovanni Fiorentino, an attribution however much debated, is presumed to have been a native of the city of Florence and, according to what we learn from Pecorone's proem, was sent into exile for political reasons in 1378 to the village of Dovadola in the Forlì Apennines.

Pasquale Stoppelli has proposed identifying the author of the Pecorone as an unidentified Giovanni da Firenze, a jester active at the court of the Anjou in Naples and known by the Nickname “Malizia Barattone.”

Ser Giovanni is the author of a collection of fifty novellas, narrated in twenty-five days each ending with a ballad, which goes by the title of “Il Pecorone” whose sources are clearly drawn from authors such as Apuleius, Boccaccio and Giovanni Villani Nuova Cronica.

The novellas are narrated by Aurecto who is the Anagram of Auctore, and the nun Saturnina who is his beloved. The title is due to a Sonnet, the authenticity of which is uncertain, that accompanies the work.

The plot of one of these novellas, that of Giannetto, was taken up by William Shakespeare, who had had the opportunity to read it through William Painter's translation and who made it matter in his “The Merchant of Venice.”

The printed editio princeps appeared in Florence in 1558 for the types of Lodovico Domenichi. The Pecorone can be read today in the edition edited by Enzo Esposito; however, there is still no true Textual criticism of the work.
