= Antonio (The Merchant of Venice) =

Character in Shakespeare's The Merchant of Venice

- The Merchant of Venice character
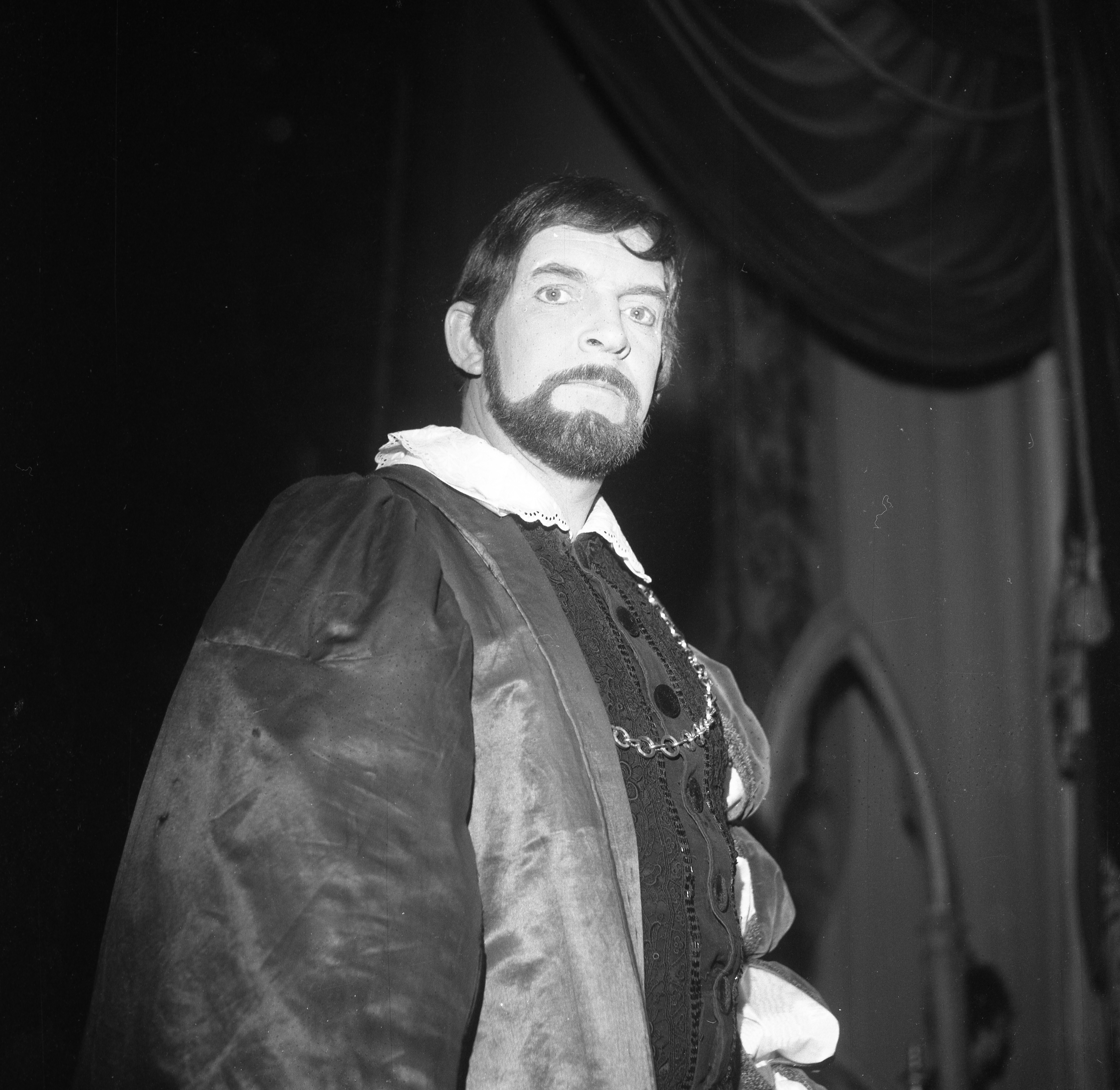
- Norwegian actor Kjell Stormoen as Antonio at Den Nationale Scene in Bergen, Norway, 1969
- First appearance: The Merchant of Venice; c. 1596–98
- Created by: William Shakespeare
- Based on: Ansaldo (Il Pecorone)
- Portrayed by: Rupert Julian; George Skillan; Carl Ebert; John Franklyn-Robbins; John Unicomb; Massimo Serato; Charles Gray; Jeremy Irons

In-universe information
- Occupation: Merchant
- Family: Bassanio (cousin)
- Religion: Catholic
- Nationality: Venetian

Antonio is the title character of William Shakespeare's play The Merchant of Venice. He is portrayed as a wealthy and respected merchant residing in Venice, known for his generosity and melancholic disposition. Antonio is a close friend of Bassanio, another important character in the play.

Despite his affluence, Antonio is depicted as being somber and melancholic, often musing about the reasons behind his sadness. He exhibits a deep sense of loyalty and friendship toward Bassanio, agreeing to borrow money on his behalf so that Bassanio can pursue the hand of Portia, a wealthy heiress.

One of the key plotlines in the play revolves around Antonio's borrowing of money from the Jewish moneylender Shylock, using a pound of his own flesh as collateral. This arrangement sets the stage for conflicts, prejudices, and moral dilemmas that drive the story's tension.

Antonio's character is emblematic of the themes present in the play, including the complexities of friendship, the consequences of prejudice, and the interplay between love and sacrifice. His interactions with other characters, particularly Shylock and Portia, contribute to the multifaceted layers of the narrative, making Antonio a significant and thought-provoking figure in The Merchant of Venice.

== Origins ==
The character of Antonio has his origins in Il Pecorone, in which a merchant named Ansaldo borrows 100,000 ducats from a Jewish moneylender, giving a pound of flesh as collateral.

The character's name is believed to derive from the musician Anthony Bassano, who was based in London at the time The Merchant of Venice was written; Bassanio's name is from the same source. It is spelled Anthonio in the First Folio.

== Plot summary ==
=== Act 1 ===
In sooth I know not why I am so sad.
It wearies me, you say it wearies you;
But how I caught it, found it, or came by it,
What stuff ‘tis made of, whereof it is born,
I am to learn
And such a want-wit sadness makes of me
That I have much ado to know myself.

When we first see Antonio, commiserating with his friends Salanio and Salarino, he is pondering the unknown source of his depressive state.

His friends try to guess the origin and nature of his condition by questioning him. First, they inquire as to whether or not he is worried about his investments. When he insists that is not the reason they ask if he is in love which he is also quick to dismiss. It is then speculated that perhaps he has a strange temperament as some people do. This pair quickly exits to make way for Bassanio who is accompanied by his friends Lorenzo and Gratiano. Lorenzo cannot get in a word for the boisterous Gratiano who makes sport of Antonio's melancholy telling him that he is too serious and that he himself would rather go through life acting foolish.

Antonio: Well, tell me now, what lady is the same
To whom you swore a secret pilgrimage
That you today promised to tell me of? (The Merchant of Venice 1.1/126–128)

Bassanio then proceeds to tell Antonio of his depleted financial state due to his own excesses, making sure to note that he is aware he already owes him money. He laments his ill-fortune but cheers at the thought of solving his problems by marrying Portia, a woman who has come into a sizeable inheritance from her father and whom he thinks is predisposed to choose him. He compares himself with Jason and his quest for the Golden Fleece. He beseeches Antonio to back this venture knowing he is not likely to be refused by his generous benefactor. Indeed, Antonio, despite the fact that his capital is already at risk elsewhere, gives him a letter of credit and wishes him well.

Later Antonio enters the Rialto to assure Shylock that he will be bound for the 3,000 ducats Bassanio wishes to borrow. Antonio has belittled and harassed Shylock in public, and he loathes him because when Christian friends of his owed money to the Jews he paid off the debts, thus depriving them of their interest. Far from lamenting his ill-treatment of the Jew who accuses him of spitting on him and calling him a dog, Antonio replies persistently "I am as likely to call thee so again, /To spit on thee again, to spurn thee too." (The Merchant of Venice 1.3/140–141) He agrees to pay with a pound of flesh if he forfeits the bond in lieu of the usual interest.

=== Act 2 ===
Antonio makes a brief appearance in this act in scene 6 when he runs into Gratiano and tells him he has twenty people out looking for him. He goes on to say there will be no masque and that Bassanio is at that moment preparing to leave for Belmont to win Portia.

=== Act 3 ===
We hear no more from Antonio until after Bassanio wins the hand of the wealthy Portia by correctly guessing which of three caskets holds her portrait. Gratiano proposes to Nerissa, Portia's maid in waiting and friend. In the midst of his merrymaking, he receives a letter detailing Antonio's misfortune. None of the ships have returned to port and as such he has no funds to pay the bond with. His flesh is forfeit to the Jew who is intent on having it. He insists he does not regret helping Bassanio and even does not wish him to feel guilty. He only asks him to come and attend his death so that he can see him one last time. Bassanio, along with Gratiano, rushes off with three times the amount owed and his wife's blessing. The gentlemen leave in such a rush that they cannot consummate their marriages.

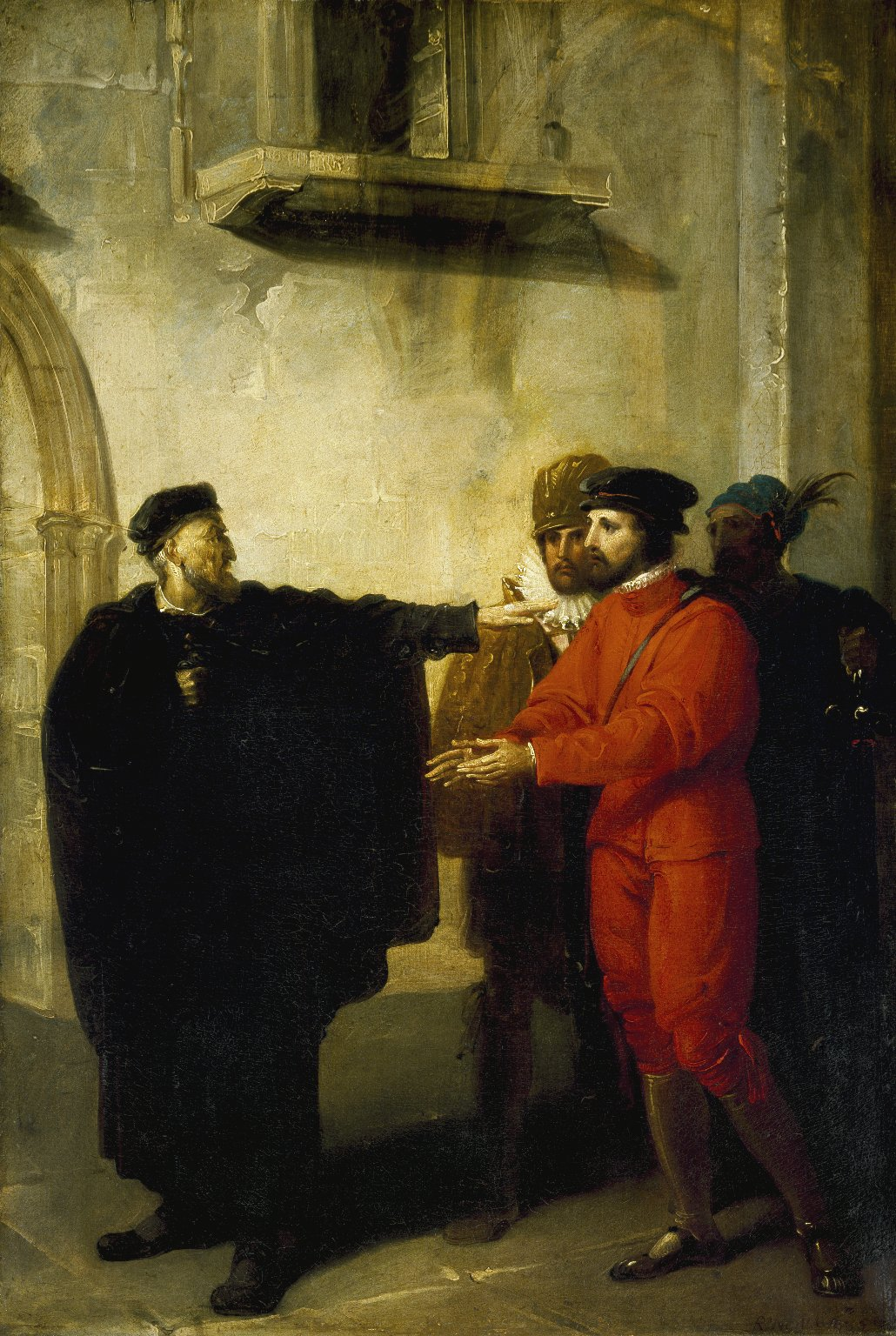
Shylock rebuffing Antonio (1795), Richard Westall

=== Act 4 ===
This act begins with Antonio's trial. The Duke pleads with Shylock to give "a gentle answer", a double entendre on the word Gentile, which meant anyone except a Jew. Shylock refuses to deny his bond. Bassanio and Gratiano are in attendance and advocate strongly that the Jew be thwarted by any means necessary. Bassanio attempts to bribe him three times the amount of the bond. Shylock says he will have nothing but his pound of flesh. All is lost until Portia and Nerissa arrive disguised as young men pretending to be a learned doctor Balthazar and his clerk. Portia pleads for mercy and gets no further than the previous applicants she seems at first to confirm the strength of the bond and tells Antonio to prepare to pay it. When all seems hopeless Bassanio declares his despair:

Antonio, I am married to a wife
Which is as dear to me as life itself;
But life itself, my wife, and all the world
Are not with me esteemed above thy life,
I would lose all, ay sacrifice them all
Here to this devil, to deliver you. (The Merchant of Venice 4.1/294–299)

Antonio is ready to die, having seen his friend one last time, but he does not have to. Shylock is fooled by Portia who points out that there is a loophole in his contract. He omitted the request to shed blood in taking the pound of flesh. As he can not remove the flesh without taking blood which he did not ask for the bond is forfeit. Since Shylock is so insistent on absolute adherence to the law he is made to lose his bond and since he as a foreigner attempted to harm the life of a Venetian he is himself subject to punishment. Shylock leaves without his revenge with the added pain of having lost a portion of his wealth and his identity as a Jew through forced conversion. Antonio and Bassanio leave together with Gratiano and run into the doctor and clerk still in disguise. They praise the doctor and insist on proffering favours to "him". At first Portia protests but then decides to test Bassanio's love for her by asking for the ring she gave him which she made him swear never to part with as a symbol of their love. Not realizing the doctor is Portia in disguise Bassanio refuses to part with it but later after Antonio convinces him that surely his wife would understand that he did it for the person who saved his friend. He sends Gratiano to give the ring to the doctor. Nerissa then manages to secure the ring she gave Gratiano from him as well.

=== Act 5 ===
Antonio accompanies Bassanio home to Belmont to celebrate his good fortune and meet Portia. After some teasing, all discover the lady's deception in regard to the rings and the trial. Antonio plays the benefactor again, this time to Jessica when he gives her legal documentation to show that she is to inherit Shylock's property at his death. The play ends with Portia bearing good news that Antonio's much-anticipated ships have arrived safely in port. He is overjoyed at his good fortune so that while he remains the consummate bachelor he is not a poor one.

== Relationship with Bassanio ==
Antonio's deep friendship and dependence on Bassanio, his willingness to risk his life on Bassanio's behalf, and his draining of his own finances to support Bassanio has been read as supporting the theory that Antonio is homosexual. Various interpreters began to read Antonio as homosexual in the 1950s, but there have been many objections. Some modern productions use the theory that Antonio is suffering from his love for Bassanio to explain his melancholic behavior.

Alan Bray's book Homosexuality in Renaissance England argues that in the time period of The Merchant of Venice's composition, "homosexuality" did not refer to an individual's sexual identity but only to specific sexual acts any individual might engage in. As Bray writes: "To talk of an individual of this period as being or not being 'a homosexual' is an anachronism and ruinously misleading. The temptation to debauchery, from which homosexuality was not clearly distinguished, was accepted as part of the common lot. Homosexuality [as understood in 16th-century England] was a sin 'to which men's natural corruption and viciousness [were] prone' " (16–17, Rainolds quoted in Bray 1995, 17).

According to the Verity edition of The Merchant of Venice, it is stated that Antonio and Bassanio are best friends; Bassanio is bound to Antonio for being his friend.
