= Il Pecorone =

Italian collection of novellas

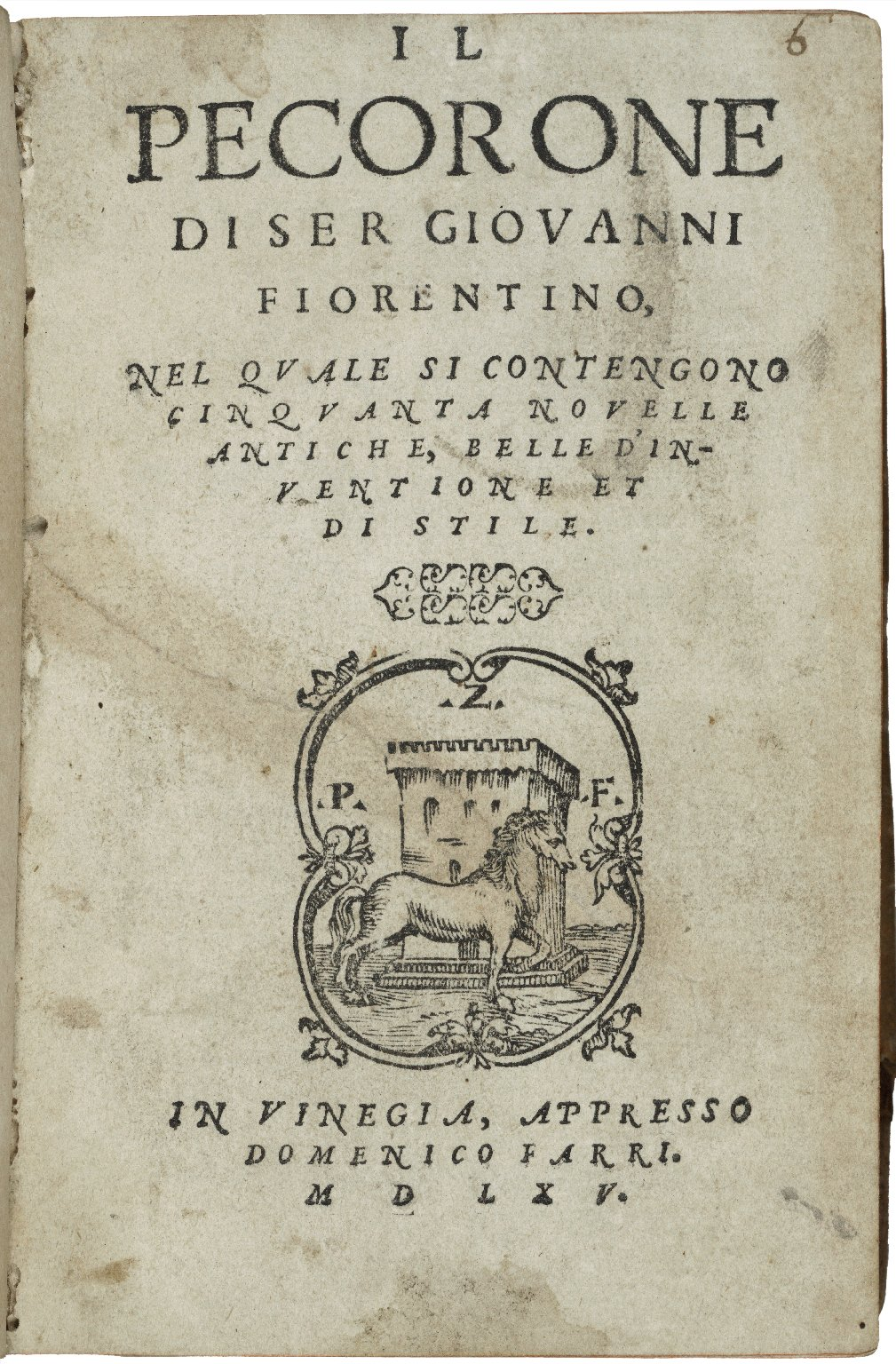
The title page from a 1565 printing of Giovanni Fiorentino's 14th-century tale Il Pecorone

Il Pecorone (lit. 'the ram (male sheep), slang for a gullible man'; known in English as The Golden Eagle) is an Italian collection of stories written between 1378 and 1385 by Giovanni Fiorentino. It was written in a style influenced by the Decameron of Giovanni Boccaccio, the Golden Legend collection of saint lives, the Seven Sages of Rome or the Gemma ecclesiastica of Giraldus Cambrensis. For its historical facts, however, it relies on the Nuova Cronica of Giovanni Villani.

It is said to be an influence on Shakespeare's The Merry Wives of Windsor and Merchant of Venice.

== Plot summary ==
Abridged from Johnson's summary:

Giannetto, a young noble of Florence, whose father has left him no money, comes to Venice and is befriended by his godfather Ansaldo, the richest merchant there. One day Giannetto expresses a desire to make a voyage to Alexandria, so as to see something of the world; Ansaldo furnishes him with a fine ship and much merchandise, and off he starts. Sailing along the Venetian coast he observes a beautiful port and asks the captain whose it is. The captain says that it belongs to a widow who has become very rich by gaining the fortunes of many lovers; for she has made it a law that whoever puts into the harbour (which is called Belmonte) must woo her, and if he fails to fulfil certain difficult conditions, give up to her everything he has brought with him. Many have tried, but the lady (who is extremely beautiful) has drugged and tricked them. So Giannetto puts into port, tries, fails, loses his valuable ship and merchandise, and returns to Venice with the story that he has been shipwrecked; and Ansaldo receives him again into his house.

A little time passes and then Giannetto again expresses a wish to travel; and Ansaldo provides him with yet costlier vessel. He reaches Belmonte, is unsuccessful again over the hard conditions, loses his property as before, and comes back to Venice. However, he is determined to make a third venture, so persuades Ansaldo to provide a third ship. Ansaldo consents, but he has spent so much money already on Giannetto that his fortune has run very low, and he has to borrow 10,000 ducats of a Jew - on the condition that if he fails to repay the loan by the Feast of St. John in the next month of June, the Jew may take a pound of flesh from any part of his body.

The contract is signed, the ship and the merchandise got ready, and Giannetto departs. Before he goes, Ansaldo who has more than a foreboding that he may not be able to repay the money, gets Giannetto to promise that if anything happens to him (Ansaldo), he will return to Venice to bid him farewell:if Giannetto does this, he can leave the world with satisfaction. And Giannetto promises. At this third venture he succeeds, through a hint from one of the lady's waiting-maids, wins and marries the lady, lives very happily and forgets all about poor Ansaldo. One day as he stands at the window of the lady's palace he sees a procession pass and asks the reason. It is Saint John's day, they tell him, and instantly he remembers that this is the fatal day for Ansaldo. He is greatly agitated, his wife enquires the cause, and, learning, bids him to hurry to Venice with 100,000 ducats to pay the debt, in case Ansaldo has not been able. It is too late however; Ansaldo has failed to pay; other merchants would discharge the debt willingly for him, but the Jew refuses and will not take even 100,000 ducats.

Meanwhile, the lady is hastening to Venice. She is disguised as a lawyer from the University of Bologna (and we will call her the Lawyer now). Arrived at an inn, the lawyer is told of this case about which all Venice is talking. He gives out that he is ready to determine difficult cases, and this one is referred to him though the Jew declares that he means to have his penalty, whatever the lawyer may say. The lawyer reasons with the Jew and urges him to take 100,000 ducats which Giannetto ( who does not recognize the lawyer) offers. But the Jew refuses, and the lawyer says there is no help- the pound of flesh must be taken. Just as the Jew is about to cut it, the lawyer interrupts: "Take care what you do: do not cut more or less, and shed no blood: else you must die." The Jew protests, but in vain and then asks for the 100,000 ducats; but the lawyer says "no:" the Jew has rejected the money, and now he shall have no money at all, not even the loan of 10,000 ducats, but only the flesh, if he will run the risk. It ends in the Jew tearing up the bond and leaving the court in a rage. Giannetto presses the lawyer to accept the 100,000 ducats, but he will only have a ring that Giannetto is wearing. Giannetto is loath to give it, but eventually does; and so they part.

The lady (as we must now call her again) returns home, and a few days later comes Giannetto, with Ansaldo and some other friends. She asks him, of course, for the ring and pretends to be terribly angry when he confesses that he gave it to the lawyer. Giannetto explains the cause by, "I swear by all that is sacred, and by your dear self, that I gave the ring to the lawyer who gained our cause". To which she replies, "And I can swear that you gave the ring to a woman therefore, swear no more". But all is explained soon, and Ansaldo marries the young maid-in-waiting who had given Giannetto the hint by which he was able to fulfil the hard conditions imposed upon the wooers and win the "Lady of Belmonte".
