= Shylock =

Character in Shakespeare's "The Merchant of Venice"

- The Merchant of Venice character
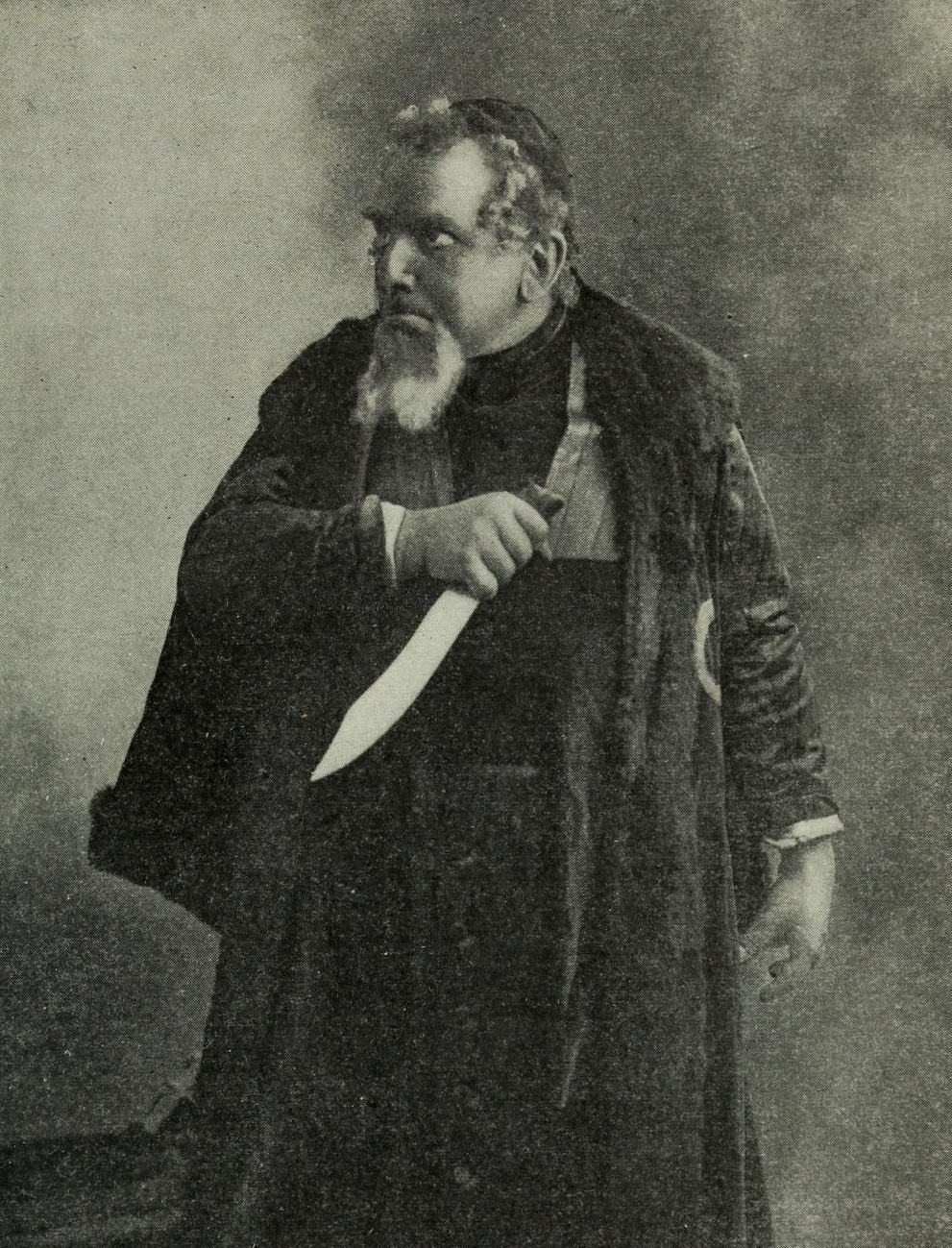
- Shylock portrayed by the actor Ernst von Possart, c. 1904
- First appearance: The Merchant of Venice; c. 1596–98
- Created by: William Shakespeare
- Based on: Barabas, from The Jew of Malta
- Portrayed by: Richard Burbage; Edmund Kean; Edwin Booth; Junius Brutus Booth; Henry Irving; Al Pacino; Phillips Smalley; Matheson Lang; Werner Krauss; Serukalathur Sama; Michel Simon; Owen Weingott; Orson Welles; Warren Mitchell; David Serero; F. Murray Abraham; Charles Macklin; William Charles Macready; John Gielgud; Henry Irving; George Arliss

In-universe information
- Occupation: Moneylender
- Family: Jessica (daughter)
- Spouse: Leah (deceased)
- Religion: Judaism
- Nationality: Venetian

Shylock (/ˈʃaɪlɒk/ SHY-lok; spelled Shylocke in the First Folio) is a fictional character in William Shakespeare's play The Merchant of Venice (c. 1600). A Venetian Jewish moneylender, Shylock is the play's principal villain. His defeat and forced conversion to Christianity form the climax of the story.

Shylock's characterisation is composed of stereotypes, for instance greediness and vengefulness. There were no legally practising Jews who lived in England during Shakespeare's time. Jews were expelled from the country in 1290 by Edward I in the Edict of Expulsion; this was not reversed until the mid-17th century (the Cromwell Era).

== Name ==
Shylock is not a Jewish name. However, some scholars believe it probably derives from the biblical name Salah, which is שלח (Šélaḥ) in Hebrew, and also appears as Shalah or Shelach in English texts. Shalah is the grandson of Shem and the father of Eber, biblical progenitor of the Hebrews. All the names of Jewish characters in the play derive from minor figures listed in genealogies in the Book of Genesis. It is possible that Shakespeare originally intended the name to be pronounced with a short "i" (as /ˈʃɪlɒk/ SHILL-ock), rather than a long one. In this scenario, the modern pronunciation would have changed because the standard spelling with a "y" signifies to readers a long 'i' pronunciation. Other scholars emphasise that, although the name echoes some Hebrew names, "Shylock" was a common sixteenth-century English name that would have been familiar to Shakespeare's fellow Londoners, and the name is notable for its Saxon origin, meaning "white-haired". The Shylocks of sixteenth-century London included "goldsmiths, mercers, and, most visibly of all, scriveners", according to prominent scholar Stephen Orgel, a Stanford professor who serves (with A. R. Braunmuller) as general editor of The Pelican Shakespeare series from Penguin.

== In the play ==
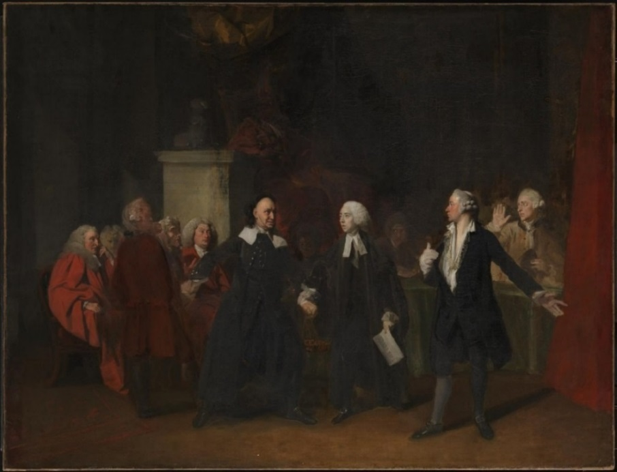
Charles Macklin as Shylock by Johan Zoffany, 1768

Shylock is a Jewish moneylender who loans 3,000 ducats to his Christian rival Antonio, setting the security at a pound of Antonio's flesh. When a bankrupt Antonio defaults on the loan, Shylock demands the pound of flesh. This decision is fuelled by his sense of revenge, for Antonio had previously insulted, physically assaulted and spat on him in the Rialto (stock exchange of Venice) dozens of times, defiled the Jewish religion and had also inflicted massive financial losses on him. Meanwhile, Shylock's daughter, Jessica, falls in love with Antonio's friend Lorenzo and converts to Christianity, leaves Shylock's house and steals vast riches from him, which add to Shylock's rage and harden his resolve for revenge. In the end – due to the efforts of Antonio's well-wisher, Portia – Shylock is charged with attempted murder of a Christian, carrying a possible death penalty, and Antonio is freed without punishment. Shylock is then ordered to surrender half of his wealth and property to the state and the other half to Antonio. However, as an act of "mercy", Antonio modifies the verdict, asking Shylock to hand over only one-half of his wealth – to him (Antonio) for his own as well as Lorenzo's need – provided that he keeps two promises. First, Shylock has to sign an agreement bequeathing all his remaining property to Lorenzo and Jessica, which is to become effective after his demise, and second, he is to immediately convert to Christianity. Shylock is forced to agree to these terms, and he exits citing illness.

== Historical background ==
In Shakespeare's time, no Jews had been legally present in England for several hundred years (since the Edict of Expulsion in 1290). However, stereotypes of Jews as money lenders remained from the Middle Ages. Historically, money-lending had been a fairly common occupation among Jews, in part because Christians were not able to offer interest-bearing loans, then considered the sin of usury, and Jews were excluded from many fields of work. At the same time, most Christian kings forbade Jews to own land for farming or to serve in the government, and craft guilds usually refused to admit Jews as artisans. Thus money-lending was one of the few occupations still open to Jews.

Hyam Maccoby argues that the play is based on medieval morality plays, exemplum, in which the Virgin Mary (here represented by Portia) argues for the forgiveness of human souls, as against the implacable accusations of the Devil (Shylock).

== Portrayal ==
=== Shylock on stage and screen ===
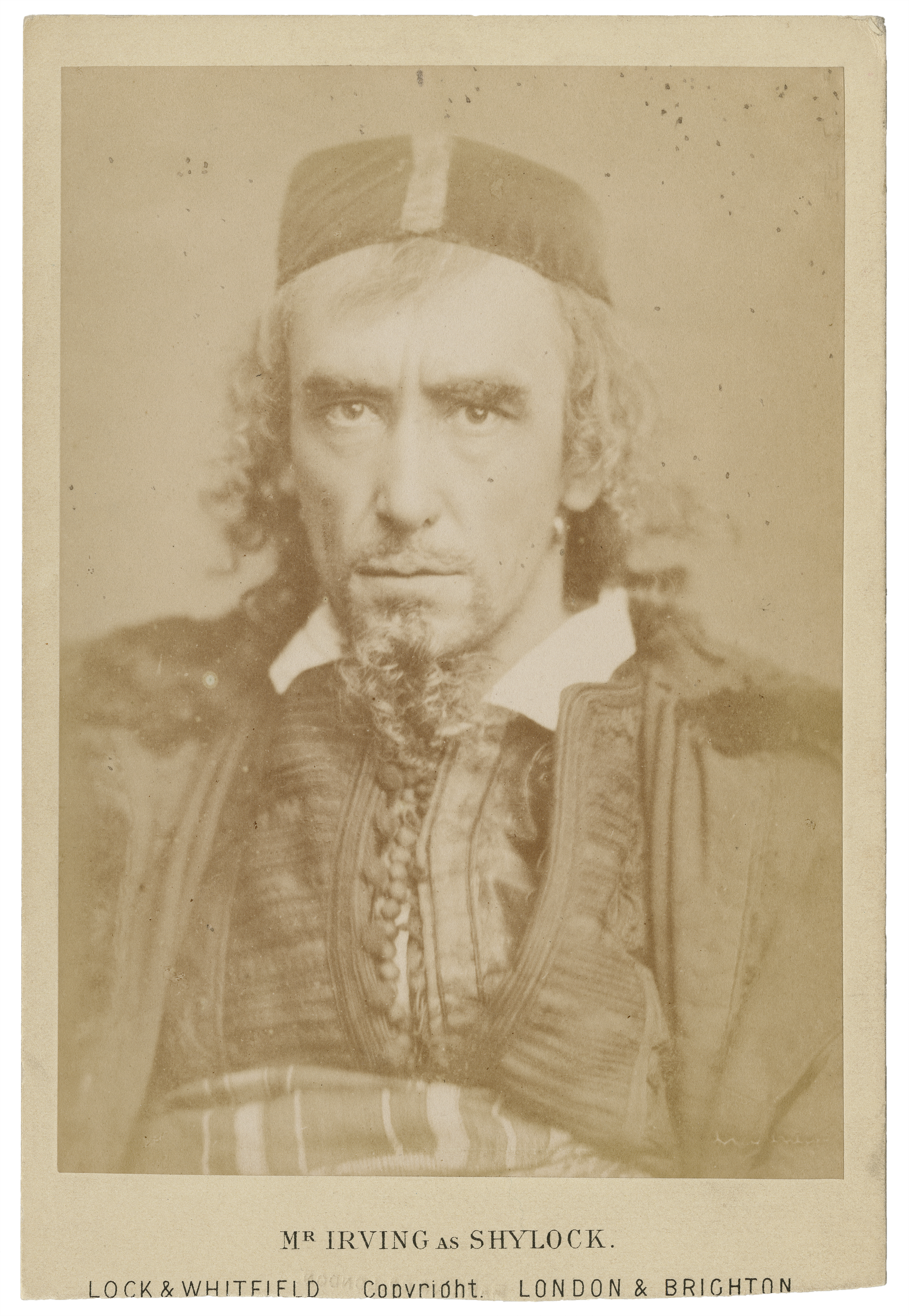
Henry Irving as Shylock in a late 19th century performance

Jacob Adler and others report that the tradition of playing Shylock sympathetically began in the first half of the 19th century with Edmund Kean. Previously the role had been played "by a comedian as a repulsive clown or, alternatively, as a monster of unrelieved evil". Kean's Shylock established his reputation as an actor.

Since Kean's time, many other actors who have played the role have chosen a sympathetic approach to the character. Edwin Booth was a notable exception, playing him as a simple villain, although his father Junius Brutus Booth had portrayed the character sympathetically. Henry Irving's portrayal of an aristocratic, proud Shylock (first seen at the Lyceum (London) in 1879, with Portia played by Ellen Terry) has been called "the summit of his career". Jacob Adler was the most notable of the early 20th century actors in this role, speaking in Yiddish in an otherwise English-language production.

Kean and Irving presented a Shylock justified in wanting his revenge. Adler's Shylock evolved over the years he played the role, first as a stock Shakespearean villain, then as a man whose better nature was overcome by a desire for revenge, and finally as a man who operated not from revenge but from pride. In a 1902 interview with Theater magazine, Adler pointed out that Shylock is a wealthy man, "rich enough to forgo the interest on three thousand ducats" and that Antonio is "far from the chivalrous gentleman he is made to appear. He has insulted the Jew and spat on him, yet he comes with hypocritical politeness to borrow money of him." Shylock's fatal flaw is to depend on the law, but "would he not walk out of that courtroom head erect, the very apotheosis of defiant hatred and scorn?"

Some modern productions explore the justification of Shylock's thirst for vengeance. For instance, in the 2004 film adaptation directed by Michael Radford and starring Al Pacino as Shylock, the film begins with text and a montage of how the Jewish community is abused by the Christian population of the city. One of the last shots of the film also highlights that, as a convert, Shylock would have been cast out of the Jewish community in Venice, no longer allowed to live in the ghetto. But he would likely not have been fully accepted by the Christians, as they would remember his Jewish birth. Another interpretation of Shylock and a vision of how "must he be acted" appears at the conclusion of the autobiography of Alexander Granach, a noted Jewish stage and film actor in Weimar Germany (and later in Hollywood and on Broadway).

== Other representations ==
St. John Ervine's play The Lady of Belmont (1924) is a sequel to The Merchant of Venice where the characters meet again some years later. All of the marriages that ended The Merchant of Venice are unhappy, Antonio is an obsessive bore reminiscing about his escape from death, but Shylock, freed from religious prejudice, is richer than before and a close friend and confidant of the Doge.

Arnold Wesker's play The Merchant (1976) is a reimagining of Shakespeare's story. In this retelling, Shylock and Antonio are friends and share a disdain for the crass antisemitism of the Christian community's laws.

The award-winning monologue Shylock (1996) by Canadian playwright Mark Leiren-Young, focuses on a Jewish actor named Jon Davies, who is featured as Shylock in a production of The Merchant of Venice. Jon addresses his audience at a "talk back" session, after the play is closed abruptly due to controversy over the play's alleged antisemitism. Davies is portrayed both in and out of character, presenting and stripping down the layers between character and actor. Composed in one 80-minute act, it premiered at Bard on the Beach on 5 August 1996, where it was directed by John Juliani and starred popular Canadian radio host, David Berner. Its American debut was in 1998 at Philadelphia's Walnut Street Theatre where it was directed by Deborah Block, starred William Leach and was "Barrymore Recommended". It has since been produced at theatres, Shakespeare Festivals and Fringes throughout Canada and the US (including the San Diego Repertory Theatre where it was staged opposite a controversial production of The Merchant of Venice), was translated for a production in Denmark and has been staged twice by the original actor, Berner, in Venice.

=== Notable portrayals ===
1911 Italian-French film.

Notable actors who have portrayed Shylock include Richard Burbage in the 16th century, Charles Macklin in 1741, Edmund Kean in 1814, William Charles Macready in 1840, Edwin Booth in 1861, Henry Irving in 1880, George Arliss in 1928, and John Gielgud in 1937. Under Nazi rule in 1943, the Vienna Burgtheater presented a notoriously extreme production of The Merchant of Venice with Werner Krauss as an evil Shylock.

After World War II, productions were sometimes featured on TV and in film as well as on stage, such as Laurence Olivier at the Royal National Theatre in 1972 and on TV in 1973, and Patrick Stewart in 1965 at the Theatre Royal, Bristol and 1978. In addition, Stewart developed a one-man show Shylock: Shakespeare's Alien and produced it while acting in the role in 1987 and 2001. Dustin Hoffman added an almost comedic shade to the role when he appeared as Shylock in a 1989 production at New York's 46th Street Theater. Al Pacino acted as Shylock in a 2004 feature film version as well as in Central Park in 2010. F. Murray Abraham played this character at the Royal Shakespeare Company in 2006. In 2015 and 2016, David Serero played Shylock in New York at the Center for Jewish History. In 2016, as part of the 500 year anniversary of the Venetian Ghetto, which converged with the 400 year anniversary of Shakespeare's death, The Merchant of Venice was performed in the ghetto main square by the Compagnia de' Colombari. Shylock was played by five actors, four men and a woman.

== Shylock and antisemitism ==
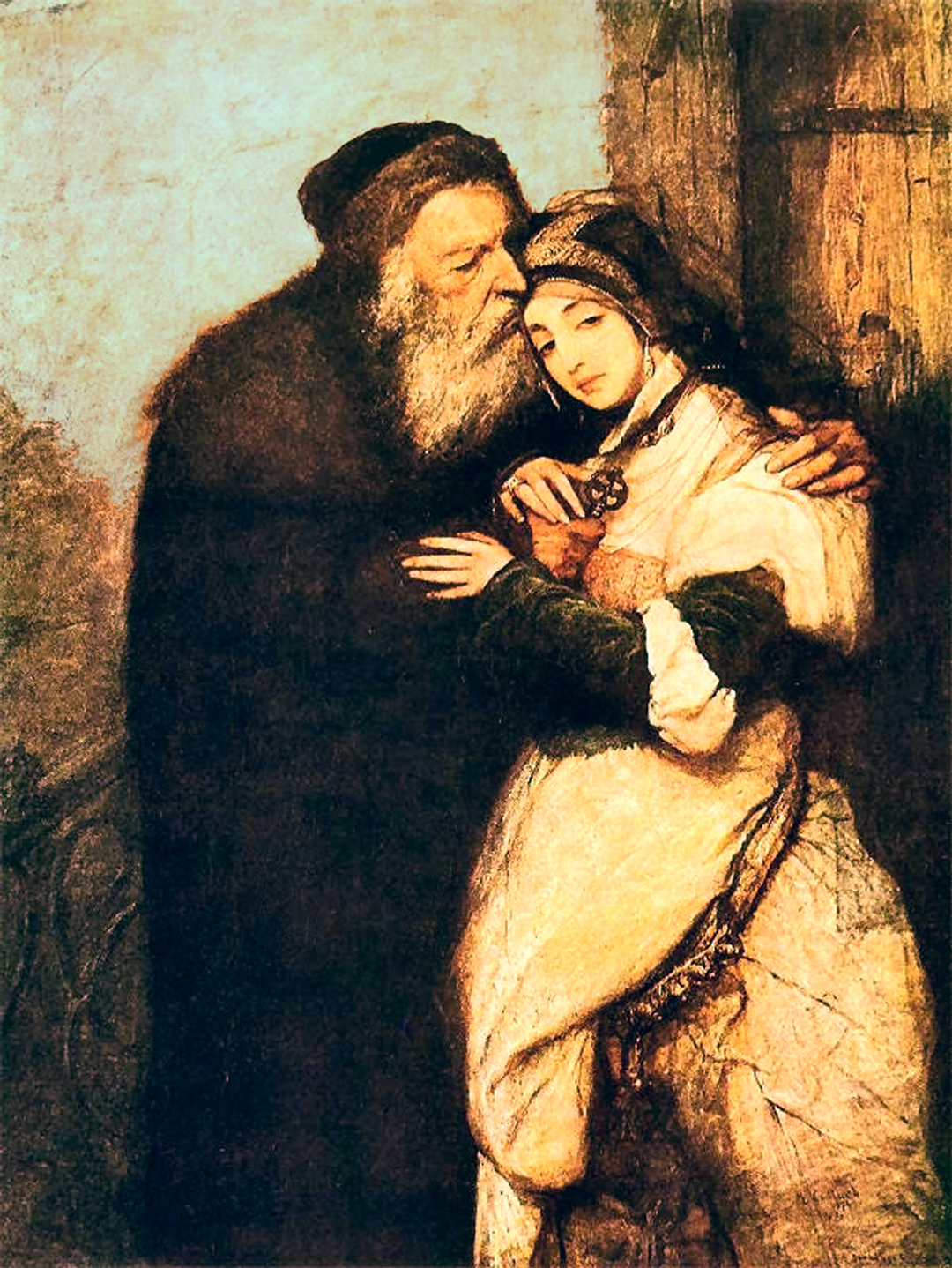
Shylock and Jessica by Maurycy Gottlieb

Since Shakespeare's time, the character's name has become a synonym for loan shark, and as a verb to shylock means to lend money at exorbitant rates. In addition, the phrase "pound of flesh" has also entered the lexicon as slang for a particularly onerous or unpleasant obligation.

=== Antisemitic reading ===
Antisemitic views were common in Elizabethan era England. It was not until the twelfth century that in northern Europe (England, Germany, and France), a region until then peripheral but at this point expanding fast, a form of Judeophobia developed that was considerably more violent because of a new dimension of imagined behaviors, including accusations that Jews engaged in ritual murder, profanation of the host, and the poisoning of wells. With the prejudices of the day against Jews, atheists and non-Christians in general, Jews found it hard to fit in with society. Some say that these attitudes provided the foundations of anti-semitism in the 20th century.

English Jews had been expelled in 1290; Jews were not allowed to return until the rule of Oliver Cromwell. In the 16th and early 17th centuries, Jews were often presented on the Elizabethan stage in hideous caricature, with hooked noses and bright red wigs. They were usually depicted as avaricious usurers; an example is Christopher Marlowe's play The Jew of Malta, which features a comically wicked Jewish villain called Barabas. They were usually characterised as evil, deceptive, and greedy.

During the 1600s, in Venice and in other regions, Jews were required to wear a red hat at all times in public to ensure that they were easily identified. If they did not comply with this rule, they could face the death penalty. In Venice, Jews had to live in a ghetto protected by Christians which was probably for their own safety. The Jews were expected to pay their guards.

Shakespeare's play possibly reflected the antisemitic tradition. The title page of the Quarto indicates that the play was sometimes known as The Jew of Venice in its day, which suggests that it was seen as similar to Marlowe's The Jew of Malta. One interpretation of the play's structure is that Shakespeare meant to contrast the mercy of the main Christian characters with the vengeful Shylock, who lacks the religious grace to comprehend mercy. Similarly, it is possible that Shakespeare meant Shylock's forced conversion to Christianity to be a "happy ending" for the character, as it "redeems" Shylock both from his unbelief and his specific sin of wanting to kill Antonio. This reading of the play would certainly fit with the antisemitic trends present in Elizabethan-era England.

=== Sympathetic reading ===
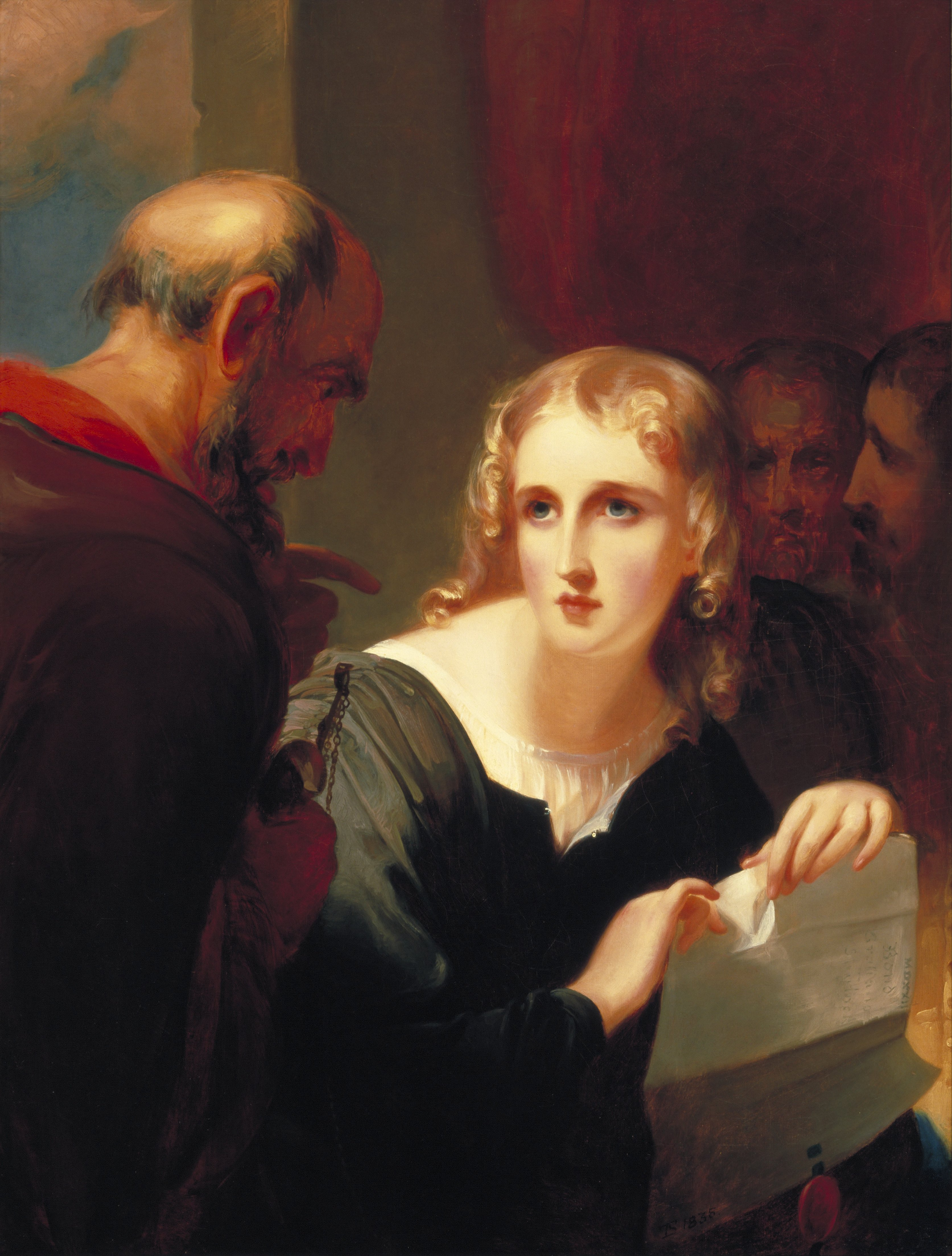
Shylock and Portia (1835) by Thomas Sully

Many modern readers and audiences have read the play as a plea for tolerance, with Shylock as a sympathetic character. Shylock's trial at the end of the play is a mockery of justice, with Portia acting as a judge when she has no real right to do so. Shakespeare does not question Shylock's intentions, but that the very people who berated Shylock for being dishonest have resorted to trickery in order to win. Shakespeare gives Shylock one of his most eloquent speeches:

Hath not a Jew eyes? Hath not a Jew hands, organs, dimensions, senses, affections, passions; fed with the same food, hurt with the same weapons, subject to the same diseases, heal'd by the same means, warm'd and cool'd by the same winter and summer as a Christian is? If you prick us, do we not bleed? If you tickle us, do we not laugh? If you poison us, do we not die? And if you wrong us, shall we not revenge? If we are like you in the rest, we will resemble you in that. If a Jew wrong a Christian, what is his humility? Revenge. If a Christian wrong a Jew, what should his sufferance be by Christian example? Why, revenge. The villainy you teach me, I will execute, and it shall go hard but I will better the instruction.

— Act III, scene I

Alexander Granach, who played Shylock in Germany in the 1920s, writes,

[H]ow does it happen that Shylock's defense becomes an accusation? ... The answer must be a perfectly simple one. God and Shakespeare did not create beings of paper, they gave them flesh and blood! Even if the poet did not know Shylock and did not like him, the justice of his genius took the part of his black obstacle [Shylock, the obstacle to the plans of the young lovers] and, out of its prodigal and endless wealth, gave Shylock human greatness and spiritual strength and a great loneliness—things that turn Antonio's gay, singing, sponging, money-borrowing, girl-stealing, marriage-contriving circle into petty idlers and sneak thieves.

=== Influence on antisemitism ===
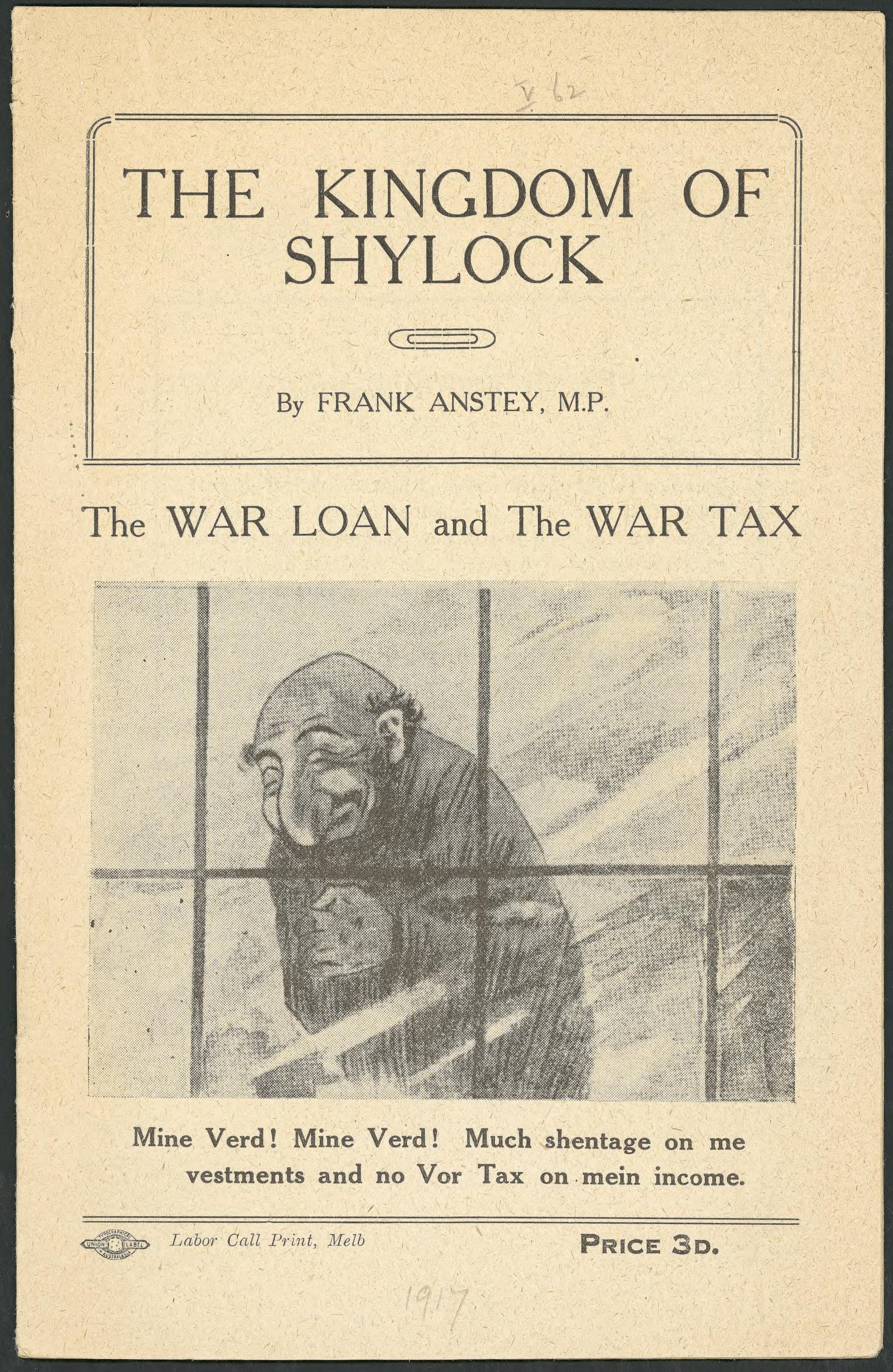
Front cover of The Kingdom of Shylock (1917), an antisemitic pamphlet authored by Australian MP Frank Anstey

Antisemites have used the play to support their views throughout its history. The 1619 edition has a subtitle of "With the Extreme Cruelty of Shylock the Jew ..." The Nazis used Shylock for their propaganda. Shortly after Kristallnacht in 1938, the German radio had broadcast a production of The Merchant of Venice to reinforce stereotypes. Productions of the play followed in Lübeck (1938), Berlin (1940), and elsewhere within Nazi-occupied territory.

The depiction of Jews in the literature of England and other English-speaking countries throughout the centuries was influenced by the character of Shylock and similarly stereotypical Jewish characters. Jewish characters in English literature were frequently depicted as "monied, cruel, lecherous, avaricious [outsiders] tolerated only because of [their] golden hoard".

== Shylock as an allusion ==
Today the word Shylock is often used to refer to any "relentless and revengeful moneylender", or any relentless person. In the early 20th century—as even now—doctors were often referred to as Shylocks because of their supposed exorbitant charges. A one-page paper from a medical journal of that time argued that most physicians—even preeminent ones—did not have adequate incomes because the code of medical ethics prevented them from charging the poor for their services. The paper ends with an ironic remark—"Is the doctor a Shylock?"

== See also ==
- History of the Jews in Venice
- Venetian Ghetto

== Bibliography ==
- Adler, Jacob, A Life on the Stage: A Memoir, translated and with commentary by Lulla Rosenfeld, Knopf, New York, 1999, ISBN 0-679-41351-0.
- Ferguson, Niall (2009). The Ascent of Money: A Financial History of the World. New York: Penguin Books. ISBN 9780143116172.
- Granach, Alexander, "There Goes an Actor," tr. Willard Trask, Doubleday, Doran, Garden City, NY, 1945. Also Granach, Alexander, "From the Shtetl to the Stage: The Odyssey of a Wandering Actor," with new Introduction by Herbert S., Lewis, Transaction Publishers, New Brunswick, NJ, 2010, ISBN 978-1-4128-1347-1.
- Smith, Rob: Cambridge Student Guide to The Merchant of Venice. ISBN 0-521-00816-6.
