= Jane Lessingham =

English actor (c.1738–1783)

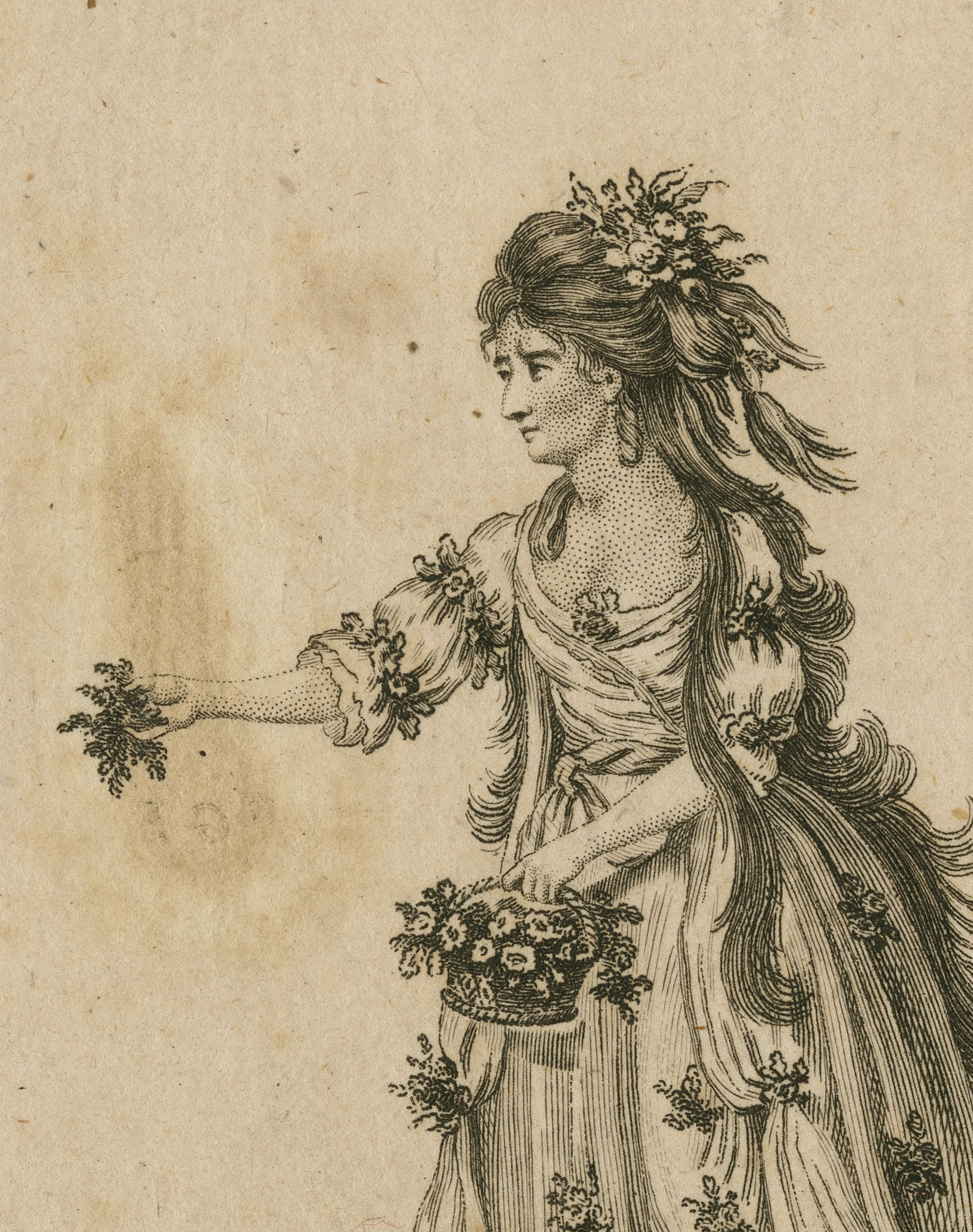
- Lessingham as the character Ophelia in a production of Hamlet in 1775.
- Born: Jane Hemet, 1738 or 1739
- Died: 13 March 1783
- Burial place: Hampstead Churchyard, London, United Kingdom
- Occupation: Stage Actress
- Years active: 1756- 1782
- Spouse: John Stott (m. 1753- div. 1765)
- Partner: Samuel Derrick (1765) Thomas Harris (1767? -1771) Admiral Boscawen Sir William Addington (1775)...
- Children: 5, Amelia Stott, Thomas Charlton Harris, Charles Harris (b. 1 June 1769), Edwin Harris (b. 2 February 1771) and William Frederick

Jane Lessingham (née Hemet, married Stott; 1738 or 1739 –- 13 March 1783) was an English stage actress from 1756 to 1782. Lessingham predominately performed at the Theatre Royal, Covent Garden, where she was known for both her beauty and her skill as a comedy actress.

Lessingham first came to the stage during 1756, when she played Desdemona in a production of Othello at the Theatre Royal, Covent Garden. It was not until March 1762 that she began to use the stage name ‘Lessingham’, when she took the part of Silvia in George Farquhar's play The Recruiting Officer. During 1768, Lessingham was involved in a public controversy between theatre managers Thomas Harris and George Colman. Colman, and other contemporary sources, cited Lessingham's ambitions as one of the major sources of the conflict.

On 13 March 1783 Lessingham died. She was buried in Hampstead Churchyard and left her estate in trust to Harris for the care of their four sons.

== Career ==
The diarist John Taylor recorded that Lessingham's career began with the support of poet Samuel Derrick, with whom she was having an affair. However in his memoirs, the actor Tate Wilkinson noted that in 1756 she was the pupil of John Rich (founder of the Theatre Royal, Covent Garden), who was behind the launch of her career. Lessingham's first performance was in the role of Desdemona in a production of Othello on 18 November 1756, under the name of Mrs Stott. She did not return to the stage again for some time, until 1762, when she began using the stage name ‘Lessingham’. Her first part was as Silvia in George Farquhar's play The Recruiting Officer, which she played in male dress. Between 1763 and 1767, Lessingham had moderate success working at Smock Alley Theatre, Dublin, Drury Lane, London and a number of small theatres in Bath, Bristol and Richmond.

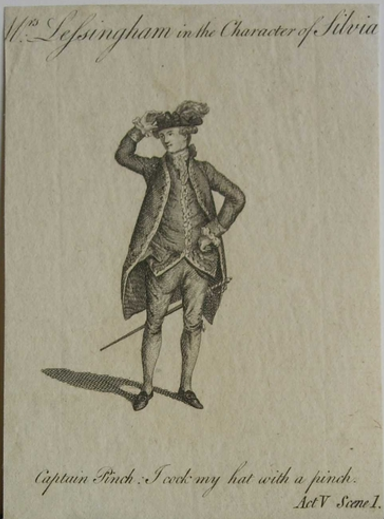
Mrs Lessingham as the character Silvia

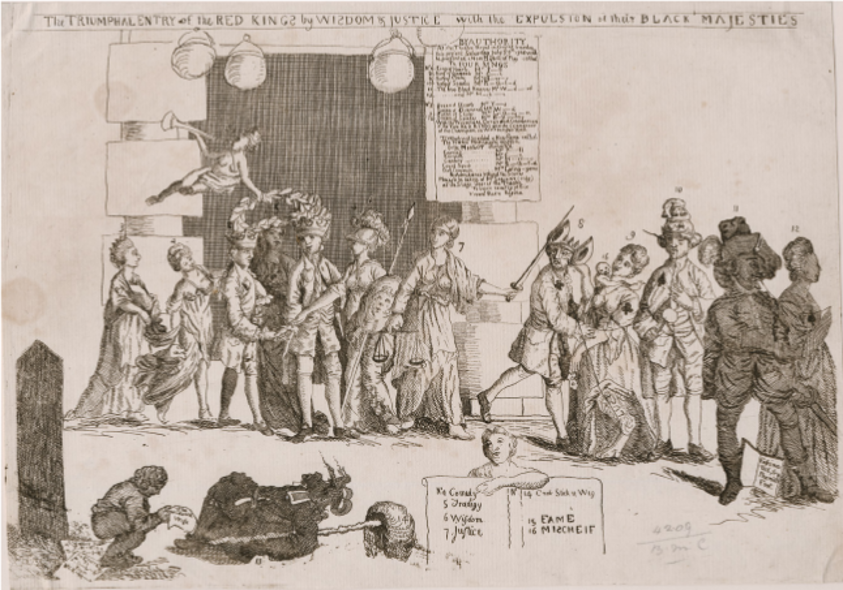
The Triumphal Entry of the Red Kings by Wisdom and Justice with the Expulsion of their Black Majesties (1768). Lessingham is pictured on the right, with her breasts exposed and the word 'Lust' written on her leg. To her left is Harris, depicted with ass ears, which Lessingham is stroking. In the middle of the doorway, Colman is depicted flanked by the personified figures of law and justice, who assist him in ousting Harris and Lessingham from the theatre.

Upon her return to the Theatre Royal (where she would remain until the rest of her career), Lessingham's career enjoyed rapid success. However, this success was the subject of much speculation and scandal, in particular during the public dispute which broke out between Harris and fellow theatre manager George Colman in 1768. In his history of the English stage, historian John Genest wrote that Lessingham was 'only a second, or rather a third rate actress- nothing but private reasons, unconnected with the theatre, could have influenced Harris to support her in the way he did'. The theatre critic John Roach recorded that the pair initially argued over Harris’ insistence on a private dressing room for Lessingham. Further dispute was caused over both Harris and Lessingham's insistence that she should play the role of Imogene in a production Cymbeline, which Colman had already assigned to another actress Mrs Yates. In his public pamphlet, Colman wrote that to give the part to Lessingham ‘would be the grossest impartiality, great injustice to Mrs Yates and an affront to the public’. Yet Lessingham was granted the role. In September, according to Colman, Lessingham rejected the minor role of Nerissa in an upcoming production of The Merchant of Venice, stating in a letter: ‘as I returned to you the part of Nerissa, I think it right to give my reason for it. I have as yet had no list of those parts it is intended I should play; when I have, and I find I have an equal share of good and bad, I shall have no objection to any, though the lowest’. The pamphlet war which ensued between Harris and Colman garnered much public interest and was often depicted in caricatures.

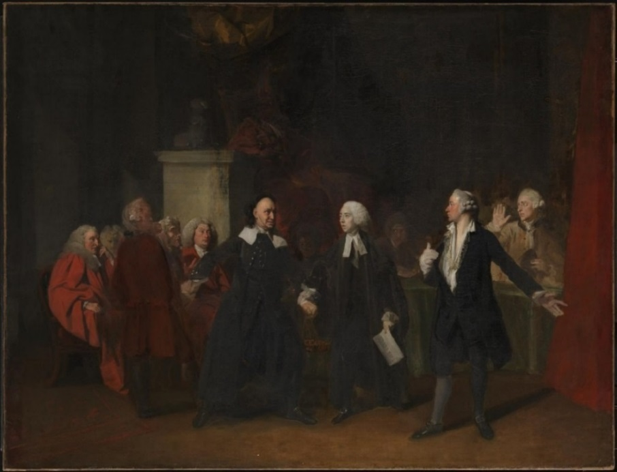
Charles Macklin as Shylock and Maria Macklin as Portia. Lessingham is in the part of Nerissa (pictured at the foot of the dais). Charles Macklin as Shylock by Johan Zoffany c. 1768.

Lessingham continued to perform at the Theatre Royal until 1782, the year before her death. There, she was paid £4 a week; raised to £7 a week during her last five seasons. In 1776, she appeared as Mrs Sullen in another of Farquhar's plays, The Beaux Stratagem, for which Taylor remarked that ‘the only improbable part of her acting in the character of Mrs Sullen was in the chamber scene with Archer, as from her general manner it did not seem likely that she should resist his importunities when he appeared as a gentleman’. Her other performances in tragic roles were largely not well received. James Stewart described her as a ‘water-gruel actress’, however ‘tolerable as Jacintha [in The Suspicious Husband], Nerissa [in The Merchant of Venice] and other parts in boy's clothes’. Equally, the critic Francis Gentleman described her as a ‘tasteless milksop’, for whom ‘parts eternally would fight, without the sense, or talents, to be right’. Her final role was as Jacintha in Benjamin Hoadley's The Suspicious Husband, in 1782.

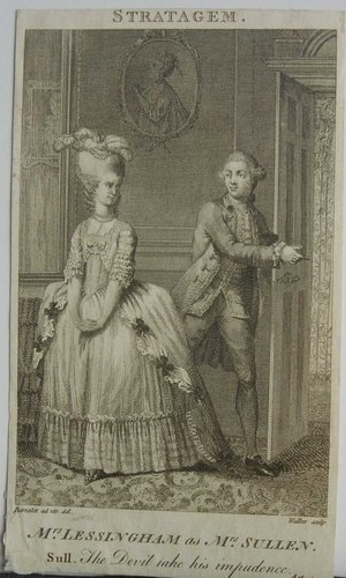
Mrs Lessingham as Mrs Sullen

== Theatreography ==
| Year | Title | Role | Venue |
|---|---|---|---|
| 1756 | Othello | Desdemona | Unknown |
| 1762 | The Recruiting Officer | Silvia | Theatre Royal, Covent Garden |
| 1762 | Jane Shore | Jane Shore | Unknown |
| 1765 | The Guardian. A Farce in Two Acts | Clackit | Theatre Royal, Covent Garden or Drury Lane |
| 1768 | Cymbeline | Imogene | Theatre Royal, Covent Garden |
| 1768 | The Merchant of Venice | Nerissa | Theatre Royal, Covent Garden |
| 1772 | Hamlet | Ophelia | Theatre Royal, Covent Garden |
| 1776 | The Beaux Stratagem | Mrs Sullen | Theatre Royal, Covent Garden |
| 1777 | The Inconstant | Oriana | Theatre Royal, Covent Garden |
| 1777 | The City Wives Confederacy | Clarissa | Theatre Royal, Covent Garden |
| 1779 | She Would and She Would Not | Flora | Theatre Royal, Covent Garden |
| 1782 | The Suspicious Husband | Jacintha | Theatre Royal, Covent Garden |
| Unknown | The Deuce is Him | Madame Florival | Theatre Royal, Covent Garden |
| Unknown | The Tragical History of King Richard III | Lady Anne | Theatre Royal, Drury Lane |
| Unknown | The refusal; or the ladies' philosophy | Sophronia | Theatre Royal, Covent Garden |
| Unknown | The Country Lasses | Flora | Theatre Royal, Covent Garden |

== Likenesses of Jane Lessingham ==
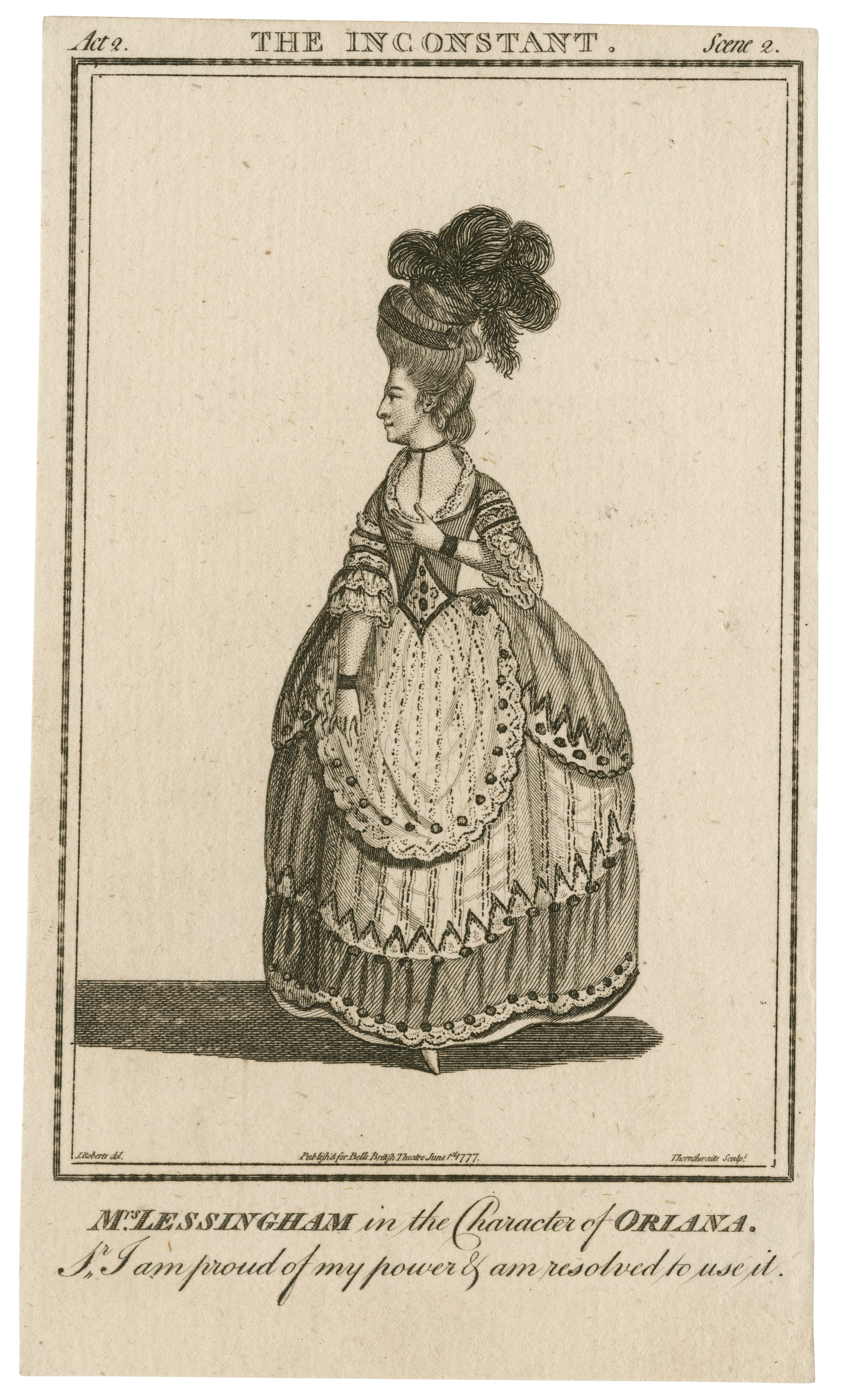
Mrs Lessingham in the character of Oriana

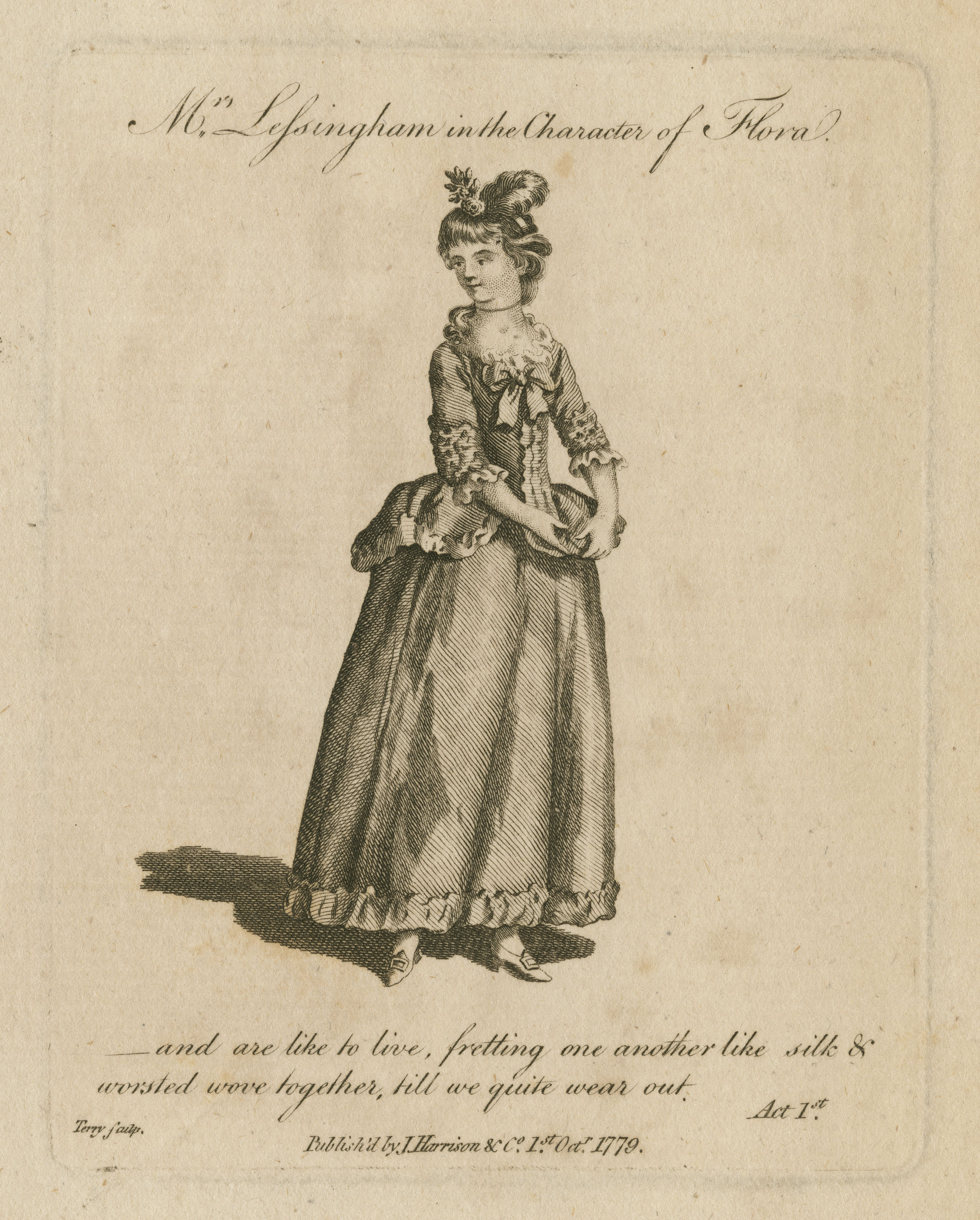
Mrs Lessingham in the character of Flora

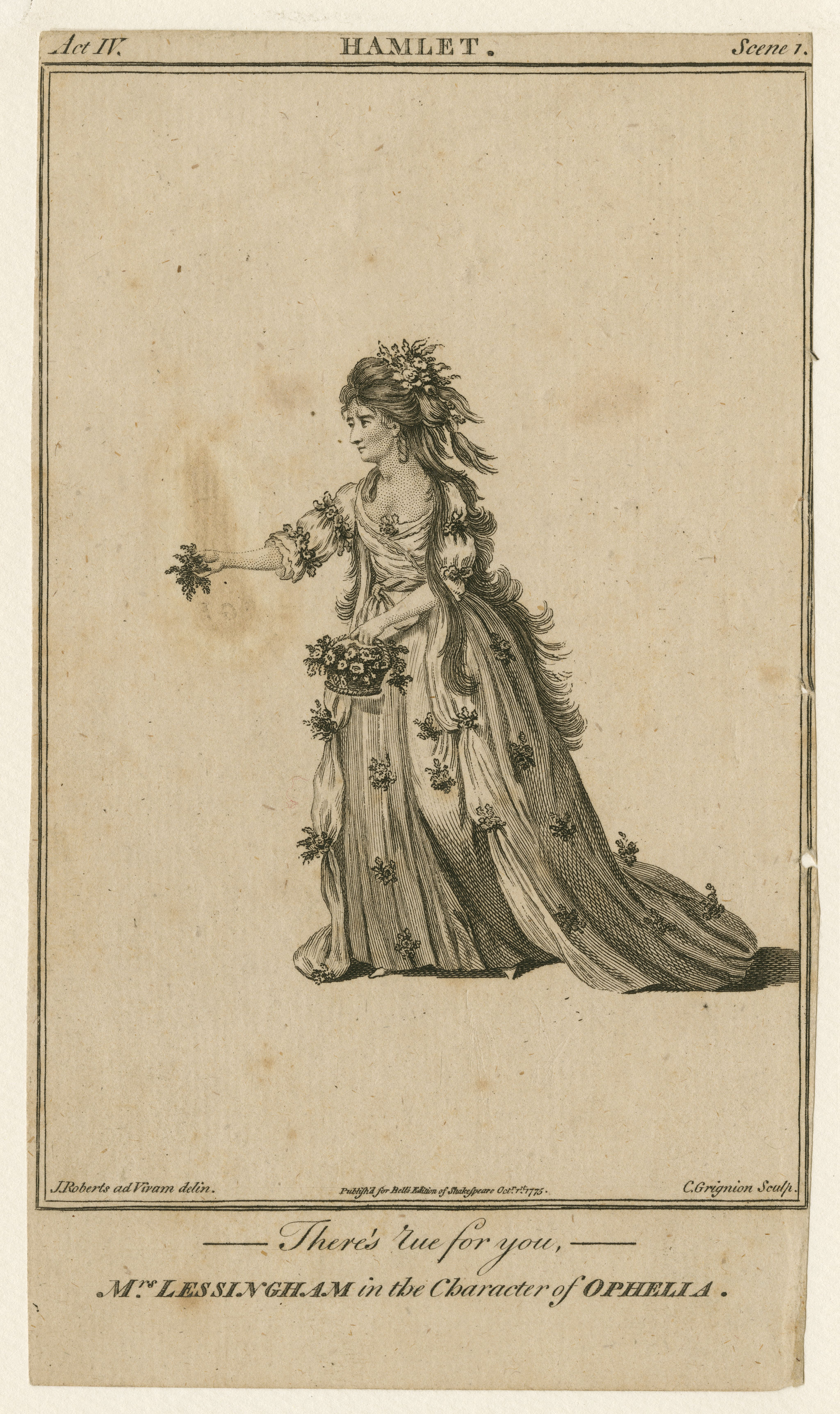
Mrs Lessingham in the character of Ophelia

== Personal life ==
In 1753, Lessingham married naval commander John Stott at St Paul's, Covent Garden. In 1765, Stott divorced Lessingham on the grounds of adultery. At the divorce trial, witnesses attested to the fact that Lessingham had given birth to a child during the three years Stott was at sea. In his concluding remarks, the presiding judge said ‘Unmindful of [your] conjugal vow, and not having the fear of God before [your] eyes, but being instigated and seduced by the devil, [you] did commit adultery with one or more strange person… and was by such criminal conversation begot with child’. Taylor recorded that Lessingham had begun an affair with Derrick before her marriage to Stott, whilst other sources suggest it was during the marriage. At some stage, the pair lived together in Shoe Lane, Holborn, where Derrick helped to prepare Lessingham to begin a career as an actress. Taylor described Lessingham as having deserted the poet due to his poverty, leaving him heartbroken. He records one incident during which, years after their separation, Derrick went to visit Lessingham whilst she was living with Harris in Hampstead. There, he was denied entry and after insistence, was met by Lessingham who called him an ‘impudent fellow’ and threatened to call the constable if he didn't leave.

Taylor later recorded that Lessingham began a relationship with Admiral Boscawen. This is confirmed by Captain William Hanger, who in his 1772 memoirs, wrote that ‘At the time Mrs L__m, the actress, was supported in a most splendid manner by Admiral B__n, whilst he was gaining laurels for himself, and glory for his country abroad, the captain [Hanger] most politely attended her at home, to prevent her grief becoming too violent in the absence of her naval admirer’.

At some stage during the 1760s, likely upon her 1767 return to the Theatre Royal, Lessingham became Harris’ mistress. One rumour tells of their affair beginning after Lessingham lifted the skirts of her petticoat to expose her legs to Harris; a story perpetuated by widely circulated prints on the matter. Together, Lessingham and Harris had four sons: Thomas Charlton Harris, Charles Harris (b. 1 June 1769), Edwin Harris (b. 2 February 1771), and William Fredrick. Utilising his connection with Colonel McMahon, secretary to the prince regent, Harris arranged in 1813 for two of his sons to gain employment in India. His first son Charles Harris was appointed as the first judge of the provincial court of appeal in India, whilst his other son Thomas Charlton Harris became the deputy Quarter-Master General of the Prune district. Harris was also responsible for the formation of the couple's other son, Edwin's, naval career.

An anonymous article from 27 August 1771 in The General Evening Post confirmed that Lessingham had left Harris. The letter read:

In 1775, Lessingham began a relationship with Sir William Addington. In that same year, he granted her land in Gibbet Hill, Hampstead, where she employed a builder to construct a house. Another builder, Henry White, protested that Lessingham wasn't entitled to the grant by filling in the excavations which had begun. In 1776, Lessingham built Heath Lodge in the centre of Hampstead Heath; an Italian villa-style property designed by James Wyatt. It was described as ‘a small, but elegant villa, situate[d] on the most elevated part of the north side of Hampstead Heath, with about two acres of land laid out with distinguished taste in pleasure grounds, shrubberies and kitchen garden’ in 1783 by the estate agent selling the property after her death. Upon her death, the property was left to Harris, however he did not attempt to claim the property until a year later. Instead, it was bought by public auction on 7 June 1783 by William Byron, 5th Baron Byron for £560.

Taylor remarked that this property was built for Lessingham by Harris before she began her relationship with Addington. He also noted that Lessingham later left Addington for a ‘teapot’ actor (named as such for frequently holding his hand on his hip). This is concurred by Warren Oakley in his book Thomas Jupiter Harris: Spinning Dark Intrigue at Covent Garden Theatre, 1767-1820.

== Death ==
On 13 March 1783, Lessingham died. She was buried four days later at Hampstead Churchyard, with a gravestone bearing her maiden name. In her will, Lessingham left her estate to Harris, in trust for their four sons Thomas, Charles, Edwin and William Frederick. The document was signed Jane Hemet and verified by Harris a year later. No mention was made of the daughter she bore whilst married to Stott.

In 1802, her son William Frederick replaced her gravestone with a new inscription reading: ‘MRS JANE LESSINGHAM, late of the Theatre Royal, Covent Garden Obt 13 March 1783, [sic] aet 44. Her grateful and affectionate son WILLIAM FREDERICK, caused this tomb to be repaired, anno 1802, as a last token of respect to her memory’.
