= Dyte =

Dyte may refer to:

== People ==
- David Moses Dyte ( 1770–1830), English Jewish quill merchant
- Jack Dyte (1918–1974), Canadian ice hockey defenceman

== Other ==
- DYTE-TV
- Kategoria e Dytë, third level of football in Albania
- -dyte, a suffix implying female decent
