= Trick for Trick =

Trick for Trick may refer to:

== Plays ==
- Trick for Trick (1678 play)
- Trick for Trick (1735 play)

== Films ==
- Trick for Trick (film)
