= Trick for Trick (1735 play) =

1735 play

- Original language: English
- Written by: Robert Fabian
- Genre: Comedy

Premiere
- Date: 10 May 1735
- Place: Theatre Royal, Drury Lane

Trick for Trick is a 1735 comedy play by Robert Fabian.

Performed at the Drury Lane Theatre as an afterpiece to Cato. It became notorious for the killing of the actor Thomas Hallam by Charles Macklin after a dispute over a costume in the green room during the performance on 10 May. Macklin was subsequently convicted of manslaughter.

The playbill listed amongst its cast Edward Berry as Don Lopez, Macklin as Sancho, Hallam as Guzman, Richard Arne as Estifania and Hannah Pritchard as Eugenia.

== Bibliography ==
- Burling, William J. A Checklist of New Plays and Entertainments on the London Stage, 1700-1737. Fairleigh Dickinson Univ Press, 1992.
- Gilman, Todd. The Theatre Career of Thomas Arne. Rowman & Littlefield, 2013.
- Nicoll, Allardyce. A History of Early Eighteenth Century Drama: 1700-1750. CUP Archive, 1927.
