= Thomas Harris (theatre manager) =

English theatre manager (died 1820)

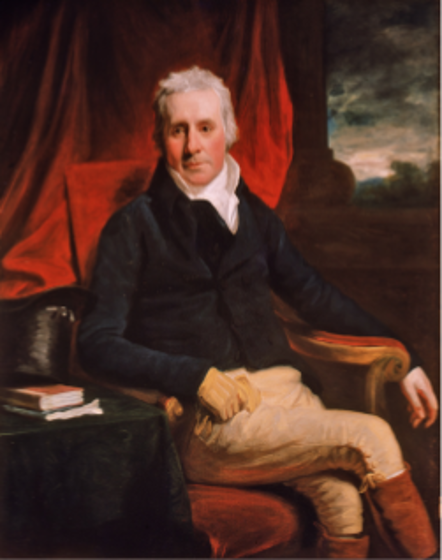
Thomas Harris (Theatre manager)

Thomas Harris (died 1820) was an English theatre manager, who became proprietor of Covent Garden Theatre.

== Life ==
His background was in business. In the autumn of 1767, with George Colman the elder, John Rutherford, and William Powell, Harris purchased from John Beard the patent of Covent Garden Theatre. The theatre opened on 14 September 1767, with The Rehearsal, in which Powell spoke a prologue by William Whitehead.

Colman took on a management role, but a serious quarrel broke out between Harris and Colman during the first season, driven by the ambitions of Jane Lessingham, an actress with whom Harris lived. Colman, with whom Powell sided, barricaded the theatre, and Harris, supported by Rutherford, broke it forcibly open. Legal proceedings and a pamphlet war followed. On 23 July 1770, a legal decision of the commissioners of the Great Seal reinstated Colman as acting manager, subject to the advice and inspection, but not the control, of his fellows. Powell, meanwhile, had died 3 July 1769.

On the resignation, 26 May 1774, by Colman of his post, Harris undertook the duties of stage-manager, which he held to until his death. He was accused of sacrificing to spectacle the artistic interests of the drama. He behaved generously to actors, however, and maintained a good reputation and some personal popularity.

Harris died on 1 October 1820 at his cottage near Wimbledon, and was buried in his family vault at Hillingdon, near Uxbridge.

== Family ==
His son, Henry Harris, lived with the actress Nannette Johnston 1811–14 after she left her husband Henry Erskine Johnston, later divorcing him. Henry later married Elizabeth Logan, a.k.a. Mrs Carey, mistress of the Duke of York in Bath on 31 December 1832. A daughter of Harris died in 1802, aged 15, and a son, George, lived to be a captain in the Royal Navy. A sister of Harris married into the family of Longmans, the publishers.

== Notes ==
Attribution

This article incorporates text from a publication now in the public domain: Stephen, Leslie; Lee, Sidney, eds. (1891). "Harris, Thomas". Dictionary of National Biography. Vol. 25. London: Smith, Elder & Co.
