= Samuel Derrick =

Irish writer (1724–1769)

Samuel Derrick (1724–1769) was an Irish writer. He became known as a hack writer in London, where he gained wide literary connections.

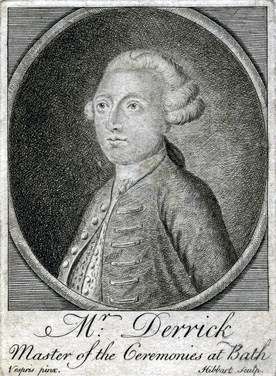
Samuel Derrick, engraving by William Hibbart

== Life ==
Born in Dublin, Derrick served an apprenticeship with a linen draper, and after that failed as an actor. He then turned to writing.

Derrick knew Samuel Johnson, who had a soft spot for him, and he helped Johnson in researching John Dryden's life. He also knew James Boswell in his early days in London. He was supported by Tobias Smollett, who gave him employment as amanuensis and on The Critical Review.

He is thought to have been the original compiler of Harris's List of Covent Garden Ladies, an annual directory of London prostitutes beginning in 1760.

Two years after the death of Beau Nash in 1761, Derrick was appointed master of the ceremonies at Bath. He was employed there, and in a similar position in Tunbridge Wells, until his death on 28 March 1769. There was no lack of criticism, with James Quin in particular (who had wanted the position in Bath) undermining Derrick.

== Works ==
Derrick published:

- The Dramatic Censor, No. 1, 1752. This title was used again in 1770 by Francis Gentleman.
- Sylla, a dramatic entertainment, from the French of Frederick II of Prussia, 1753.
- A Voyage from the Moon, from the French of Cyrano de Bergerac, 1753.
- Memoirs of the Count de Beauval, from the French of D'Argens, 1754.
- The Third Satire of Juvenal, translated into English verse, 1755.
- A View of the Stage, 1759, published under the name of John Wilkes.
- The Battle of Lora, a poem, from Ossian, 1762.
- Dryden's Works, with a Life and Notes, 1760, 4 vols.
- A Poetical Dictionary, 1761, 4 vols.
- A Collection of Voyages, 1762, 2 vols.
- Letters written from Leverpoole, Chester, Corke, 1767, 2 vols. This gains a mention from a character in Tobias Smollett's epistolary novel The Expedition of Humphry Clinker.

A compilation entitled Derrick's Jests, or the Wit's Chronicle, was published soon after his death.

== Notes ==
Attribution

This article incorporates text from a publication now in the public domain: Stephen, Leslie, ed. (1888). "Derrick, Samuel". Dictionary of National Biography. Vol. 14. London: Smith, Elder & Co.
