= Thomas Hallam (actor) =

British stage actor

Thomas Hallam (died 1735) was a British stage actor.

== Biography ==
Hallam was the first in a dynasty of actors, including his sons Lewis Hallam and William Hallam who led a pioneering theatre company to the United States and his granddaughter Isabella Mattocks. His family also included the brothers George, William and Lewis Hallam. After appearing at the Smock Alley Theatre in Dublin for many years, he joined the Drury Lane company in 1725. He remained there for the next decade, taking part in the Actor Rebellion of 1733. An actor named Hallam appeared in several early Henry Fielding plays including The Author's Farce and Tom Thumb at the Haymarket but this was likely to be Adam Hallam, one of his sons. By 1731 Adam was also appearing on Drury Lane playbills along with his father.

While Hallam was ambitious to play leading roles, he was generally consigned to supporting parts. On 10 May 1735 during a performance of the farce Trick for Trick he got into a dispute with fellow actor Charles Macklin over a wig they used during the play. During the trial, Macklin narrated that, having been provoked, he pointed his cane towards Hallam but his face "turned about unluckily" so that the stick pierced his eye and brain. The wound proved fatal and Macklin was tried for murder, but after conducting his own defence had this reduced to a conviction of manslaughter. Accounts cited that Macklin was later freed and went back to the theatre but suffered an unfavourable reputation among the public.

== Bibliography ==
- Gilman, Todd. The Theatre Career of Thomas Arne. Rowman & Littlefield, 2013.
- Highfill, Philip H, Burnim, Kalman A. & Langhans, Edward A. A Biographical Dictionary of Actors, Actresses, Musicians, Dancers, Managers, and Other Stage Personnel in London, 1660-1800: Garrick to Gyngell. SIU Press, 1978.
- Kelly, Ian. Mr Foote's Other Leg: Comedy, tragedy and murder in Georgian London. Pan Macmillan, 2012.
- Straub, Kristina, G. Anderson, Misty and O'Quinn, Daniel . The Routledge Anthology of Restoration and Eighteenth-Century Drama. Taylor & Francis, 2017.
