= Charles Macklin as Shylock =

Painting by Johann Zoffany

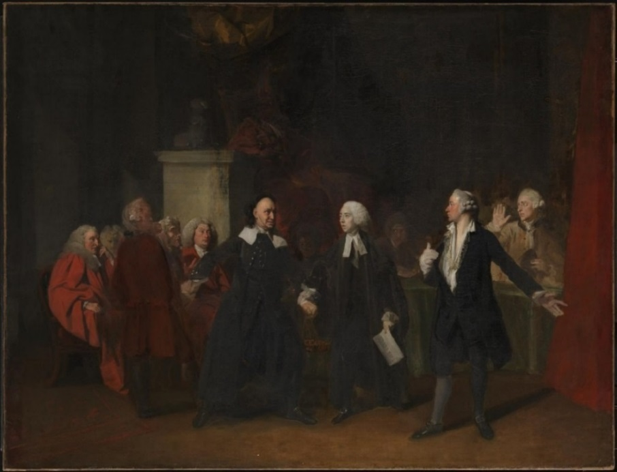
- Artist: Johan Zoffany
- Year: c. 1768
- Type: Oil on canvas, conversation piece
- Dimensions: 116.2 cm × 151.1 cm (45.7 in × 59.5 in)
- Location: Tate Britain, London

Charles Macklin as Shylock is a c.1768 oil painting by the German-born British artist Johan Zoffany. A conversation piece, it features a group portrait painting of actors performing the courtroom scene in William Shakespeare's The Merchant of Venice.

It depicts the Irish actor Charles Macklin in his most celebrated role Shylock alongside his daughter Maria Macklin as Portia, Robert Bensley as Bassanio and Jane Lessingham as Nerissa. The cast had recently appeared at the Theatre Royal, Covent Garden. The seated figure on the far left is the Lord Chief Justice Lord Mansfield, suggesting that he may have commissioned the work. Today the painting is in the collection of Tate Britain in London.

Around the same time Zoffany also produced a full-length portrait painting of the same title featuring Macklin alone, which is now in the Holbourne Museum in Bath.

== Bibliography ==
- De Marly, Diana. Costume on the Stage, 1600-1940. Batsford, 1982.
- Highfill, Philip H., Burnim, Kalman A. & Langhans, Edward A. A Biographical Dictionary of Actors, Volume 10. Actresses, Musicians, Dancers, Managers, and Other Stage Personnel in London 1660-1800. SIU Press, 1973.
- Newman, Ian and O'Shaughnessy, David. Charles Macklin and the Theatres of London. Liverpool University Press, 2022.
