= Maria Macklin =

British actress (1733–1781)

- Born: 1733; Portsmouth, England
- Died: 1781 (aged 47–48)
- Occupation: Actor
- Parent: Charles and Ann Macklin

Maria Macklin (1733 – 1781) was a British actress. Her parents were both leading Irish born actors.

== Life ==
During the 1730s her father Charles Macklin and her mother Ann Grace Purvor were lovers. They were both Irish born actors appearing on the London and Dublin stages. Her mother assumed the name of Macklin although it is unlikely they ever married. She was born in 1733 in Portsmouth. By 1738 she and her parents were living in Covent Garden and in 1739 her mother stopped appearing as "Mrs Grace" and began appearing as "Mrs Macklin" as if they had been married. Her father made his name when he recreated the character of Shylock on 14 February 1741 using a natural form of acting and ignoring the comedic character that had become the tradition.

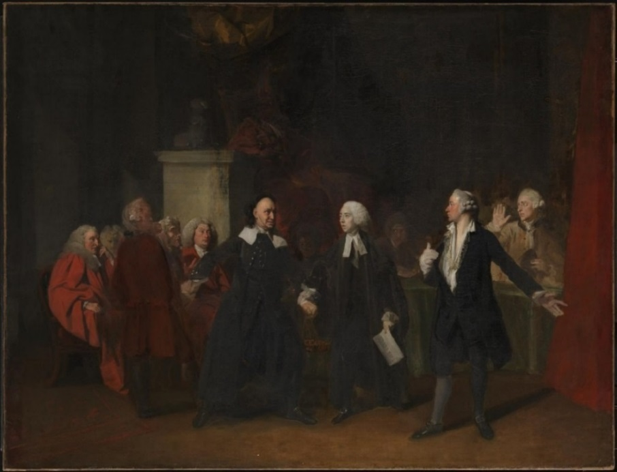
Charles Macklin as Shylock and Maria Macklin as Portia. Jane Lessingham is in the part of Nerissa (pictured at the foot of the dais). Charles Macklin as Shylock by Johan Zoffany c. 1768.

She took acting lessons from her father who had created a new way of acting when he appeared as Shylock. She made her debut on the stage in 1742 taking the role of the Duke of York in Richard III, which was a role traditionally used to introduce new child actors. Her first adult role was on 10 April 1751 when she appeared as Athenais in Theodosius. Her later role of Lady Townly in The Provok'd Husband was a comedic and was well received by the audience.

In 1753 she joined the company at Drury Lane led by David Garrick. She appeared in The Englishman in Paris repeating her role as Lucinda. The author replaced her father in the role of Buck as Samuel Foote because he did not like her father's portrayal. Her father went off to start a coffee house featuring talks by himself whilst Maria improved her reportoire. In 1754/5 she played Polly in the Beggar's Opera and her mother's role of Wikow Lackit in Oroonoko. In addition she created the first characterisations of Constantia in The Chances and Irene in Barbarossa. She also played Rosalind in As You Like It, Jacintha in The Suspicious Husband and Almeira in The Mourning Bride. She played Almeira at her benefit that season.

Her mother became ill and this meant that she and her father had to turn down on off to both of them in order that they could care for Anne. Her mother died on 28 December 1758. Maria was still working at Drury Lane where she was well treated by David Garrick. She left in 1760 to appear as Juliet at Covent Garden leaving Drury Lane at the same time as her father, who had fallen out with Garrick.

In 1768 Johan Zoffany created a painting of her father's renowned role of Shylock. Maria was included in the painting in the role of Portia and Jane Lessingham is at the foot of the dias. The painting is unusual in that it includes Lord Mansfield to the left who may have commissioned the painting which is now in The Tate in London.

She became a popular actress.

Her father soon began an affair with his servant Elizabeth Jones after his wife died. Elizabeth was about the same age as Maria. Elizabeth and her father were together for some years before they married on 13 February 1778.

She died in 1781 after having a growth on her knee removed. It was said that the growth was due to tightening her garters too much when playing breeches roles. She had put off having her legs examined until surgery was the only option.
