= Charles Macklin =

Irish actor (1699–1797)

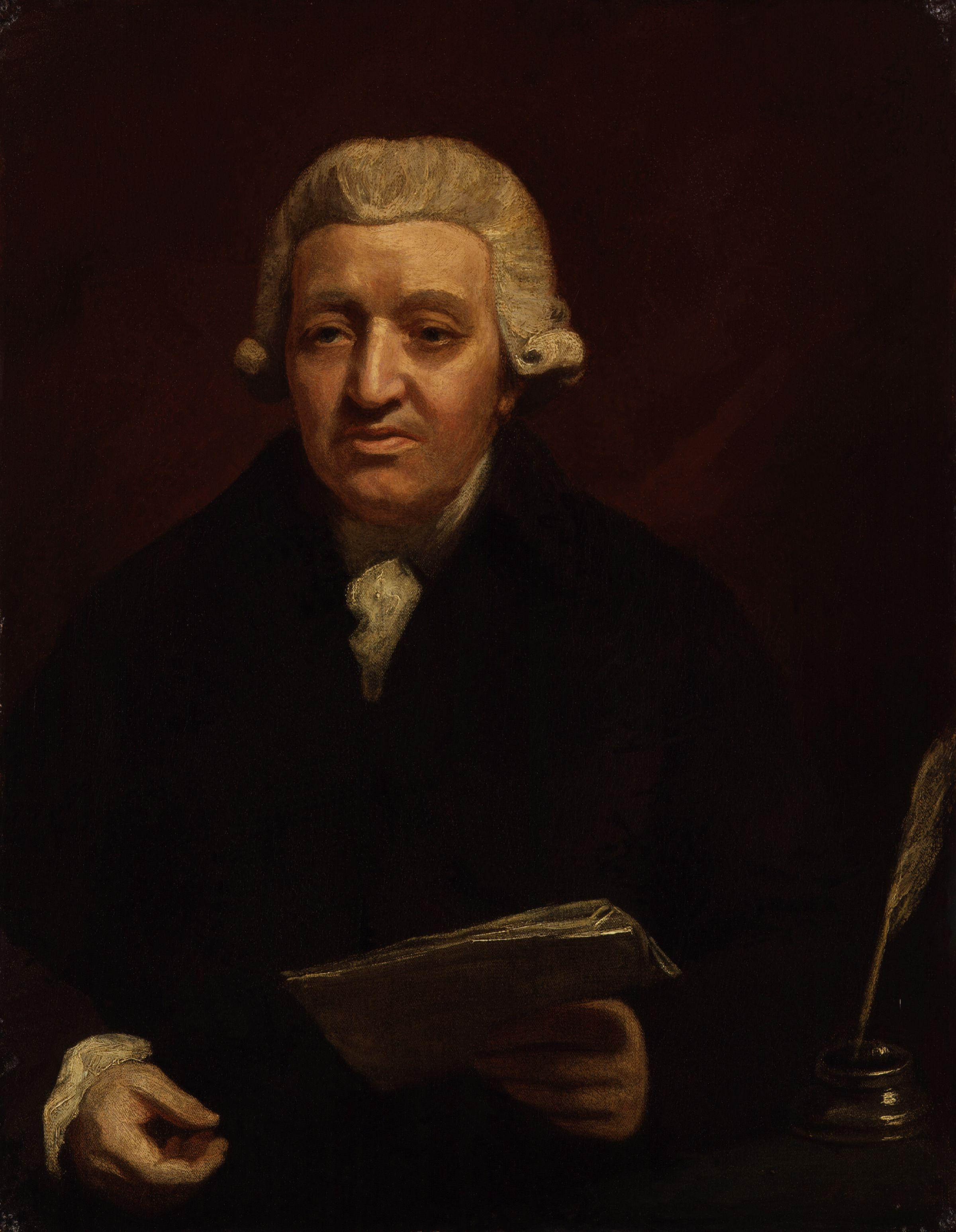
- Portrait by John Opie, 1792
- Born: 26 September 1699; Inishowen, County Donegal, Ulster, Kingdom of Ireland
- Died: 11 July 1797 (aged 97); London, England
- Occupation: Actor
- Known for: Acting in the natural style
- Spouse: Elizabeth Jones
- Partner: Ann Grace Purvor
- Children: Maria Macklin

Charles Macklin (26 September 1699 – 11 July 1797), born as Cathal MacLochlainn (English: Charles McLaughlin), was an Irish actor and dramatist who performed extensively at the Theatre Royal, Drury Lane. Macklin revolutionised theatre in the 18th century by introducing a "natural style" of acting. He is also famous for accidentally killing a man during a fight over a wig at the same theatre.

Macklin was born in Inishowen in the north of County Donegal in Ulster, the northern province in Ireland. He was raised in Dublin, where he attended school in Islandbridge after his father's death and his mother's remarriage. Macklin became known for his many performances in the tragedy and comedy genre of plays. He gained his greatest fame in the role of Shylock in The Merchant of Venice. Macklin enjoyed a long career which was often steeped in controversy before dying aged 97.

== Early life ==
It is thought that Macklin was born in 1690 near Culdaff, a village in the north-east of Inishowen in the north of County Donegal in Ulster, the northern province in Ireland, and that he moved to Great Britain in either 1725 or 1726; the dates in his early life are not entirely clear. According to William Archer in Eminent Actors, "at his death, Macklin was believed to be 97, but his biographers have endeavoured to show that he was at least 107. The main lines of controversy are to be found in the 3 biographies of Congreve, Kirkman, and Cook". Thomas Kirkman and William Cooke, in Eminent Actors, assert that "William MacLochlainn, father of Charles Macklin, had a daughter and a son, who were born two months prior to the Battle of the Boyne, which took place in 1690". Given this information, this would make Macklin 107 years old at his death. However, in his own words, he was born 'in the last year of the last century', making the year 1699 the year of his birth. In fact, The Monthly Mirror of February 1796, a year before his death, stated that: "Macklin, according to this statement, must be in his hundred and sixth year, or thereabouts, whereas he is in fact no more than ninety-seven". According to William Archer, author of Eminent Actors, there "were no registers of births, deaths, and marriages kept in Ireland in 1690".

Given this information, we must once again go with the very words of Macklin himself who quoted "that he was born in the last year of the last century". His early life may remain a mystery, but we can be certain of his age at death. His family's surname was McLaughlin, but "seeming somewhat uncouth to the pronunciation of an English tongue", he changed it for the English stage. He found various jobs as an actor in London, but, apparently, his Ulster accent was an obstacle to success and he could not find a steady theatre home until he was noticed in a small character role in Henry Fielding's Coffee-House Politician at Lincoln's Inn Fields in 1725. It was after that fine performance, that would go unnoticed by a lesser actor, that he was snatched up by the Theatre Royal on Drury Lane as an actor and a resident acting manager, serving with James Quin. Their relationship was professional, but full of plenty of animosity. Macklin devotes a lengthy section of his memoirs to Quin, giving examples of their disagreements. Macklin admits that "nothing but the necessity of business could ever make them associate together". Even the necessity of business sometimes dissolved; however, after some contract and pay disagreements in the 1741–42 season, Macklin and nearly the entire Drury Lane resident company left and attempted to find work elsewhere.

== Shylock and other roles ==
Macklin's most important role, the one that catapulted him to stardom in eighteenth-century London, was Shylock in The Merchant of Venice on 14 February 1741. For several decades, the popular version of the play was a "fixed" text by George Granville, titled The Jew of Venice. In it, many roles were expanded, while Shylock and others were dramatically shortened. The eighteenth-century audiences were used to seeing a comic Shylock.

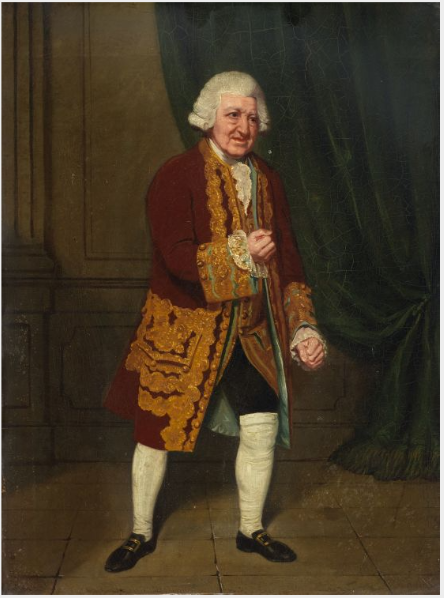
by Samuel De Wilde

Macklin wanted a different path to playing this character. While Macklin did not return to Shakespeare's script exactly as it was written, he did make his own edits to his script that were much closer than Granville's text. Instead of portraying Shylock as the usual comic pantolone, he played him as darkly villainous, serious, and highly satirical. Next, rather than dress Shylock as a clown, Macklin researched his role. He studied Josephus' Antiquities of the Jews, and in the old testament. He learned that Italian Jews, especially from Venice, were known to wear red hats, so he took that as a basis for his costume. In seeking to portray Jews exactly how they looked, Macklin emphasised the notion of historical accuracy in costuming, which would later become an inherent feature of realism in the 19th century. Macklin did not merely "study" the Jews. According to Appleton, "he actually interacted with them in marketplaces and learned to gradually adapt their way of speech".

Finally, opening night came. This faithfulness to Shakespeare's original intent for the character, combined with Macklin's revolutionary method of attempting some semblance of realism in his performance, resulted in uproarious applause. Macklin himself confesses, "On my return to the green-room, after the play was over, it was crowded with nobility and critics, who all complimented me in the warmest and most unbounded manner". King George II saw the production and was so moved he could not fall asleep that night. "This is the Jew/ That Shakespeare drew" is a phrase attributed to Pope.

Many tried to replicate Macklin's performance of Shylock, but none of the six actors that attempted the role at the rival Covent Garden theatre from 1744 to 1746 were able to match nearly the acclaim that Macklin had received for his Shylock. Even Macklin was unable to match his performance. He did have a varied career, filled with at least 490 roles, but none of them were anywhere near the uproar his Shylock caused. Even his two closest in hype, roles from The Confederacy and Love for Love, were roles designed to emulate Shylock. He played Shylock for nearly the next fifty years, as well as Iago in Othello and the Ghost in Hamlet. In Ben Jonson's Volpone, he played the part of Mosca. He was the creator of Sir Pertinax Macsycophant, a famous burlesque character, and he was Macbeth at Covent Garden in 1772, in a production with authentic Scottish costumes.

Together with David Garrick, his student, friend, and partner, Macklin revolutionised acting in the 18th century. Garrick and Macklin eventually had a falling out in the mid-1740s, which derailed Macklin's rise whilst propelling Garrick's own career. Macklin, then the stage manager at Drury Lane, participated in an actor walkout. When the actors, led by Garrick, were forced to accept the owner's terms, they had to abandon Macklin, who, as the stage manager, could have quelled the actors' strike, rather than participated in it. Macklin felt betrayed by Garrick and the other actors and he refused the £3 a week that Garrick offered him.

He also acted regularly in Dublin, in the Aunger Street and Smock Alley Theatres and in the Crow Street Theatre, which he founded in 1758.

Macklin was replaced by Samuel Foote at Drury Lane when he was appearing in An Englishman in Paris. It was written by Foote and he took Macklin's role. Maria Macklin remained in the cast and Macklin opened his own establishment in 1753. He opened a tavern at which he gave a nightly lecture followed by a debate, which Macklin called the British Inquisition. According to some histories, Macklin claimed at one of these shows to have such a good memory that he could recite any speech after reading through it once. As a challenge, Samuel Foote allegedly wrote The Great Panjandrum, a nonsense poem designed to be particularly difficult to memorise. The word Panjandrum has since passed into the English language.

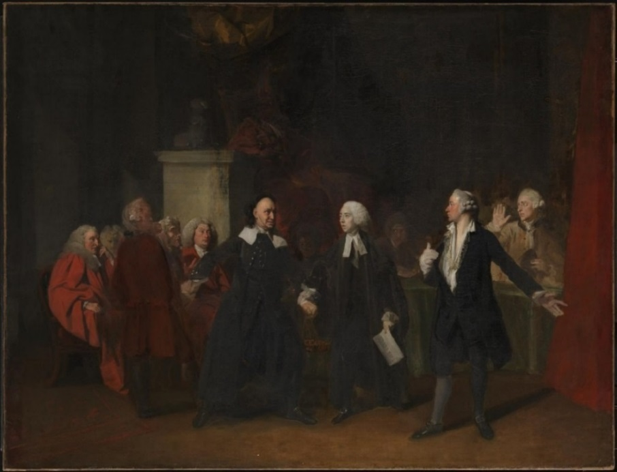
Macklin as Shylock and Maria Macklin as Portia. Jane Lessingham is in the part of Nerissa (pictured at the foot of the dais). Charles Macklin as Shylock by Johan Zoffany c. 1768.

In about 1768 Johan Zoffany created a painting of Macklin's renowned role of Shylock. Maria Macklin was included in the painting in the role of Portia and Jane Lessingham is at the foot of the dias. The painting is unusual in that it includes the lawyer Lord Mansfield to the left who may have commissioned the painting. The painting is now in The Tate in London.

Macklin returned to the stage, but finally retired in 1789, when he found he was no longer able to recall the entire part of Shylock. He lived another eight years, supported by the income from a subscription edition of two of his best plays, The Man of the World and Love in a Maze.

== Playwright ==
He wrote many plays, including Love a la Mode (1759), The School for Husbands, or The Married Libertine (1761), and The Man of the World (1781). The True-Born Irishman (first performed 1761, published 1783), renamed The Irish Fine Lady for its English production, was a hit in Ireland, but a flop in England. Macklin observed: "I believe the audience are right. There's a geography in humour as well as in morals, which I had not previously considered." Brian Friel used the play as the basis for his one-act The London Vertigo produced in Dublin in 1992.

== Introduction of naturalistic acting ==
Macklin revolutionised acting in the 18th century by introducing a natural style of acting, being the first actor of his generation to break away from the old declamatory style. According to Wilson Goldfarb, "the predominant approach to acting in the 18th century is usually described as bombastic or declamatory, terms that suggest its emphasis on oratorical skills". Due to this emphasis on speaking, rehearsal time was short, stage movement was standardised, and actors often spoke directly to the audience rather than characters onstage. Wilson and Goldfarb go on to say that there were a few innovators who were "opposed to the emphasis on declamation, stereotypical positions of performers onstage, and singsong delivery of verse; they wanted to create individual characters, and they wanted to have more careful rehearsal procedures". As a performer, Macklin was confined to the mainstream practices of 18th-century theatre companies but, through training young actors, he was able to put his ideas into practice.

== How Macklin trained his students ==
Appleton states that "Macklin believed acting a science, founded upon nature. He stressed the importance of a thorough knowledge of one's role, of propriety of dress, and of attention the business of the scene; the necessity of avoiding monotony of tone". It was not uncommon for Macklin to advise a student to unlearn all they had learned about acting. According to Appleton "Macklin made this the preliminary condition for all of his pupils. To hesitate was to be instantly dismissed. But once the condition had been agreed to, Macklin proved a dedicated teacher, willing to take infinite pains and often willing to instruct them for nothing". Most importantly, Macklin wanted his students to speak as they would in everyday life; basically transferring reality to the stage. Appleton portrays how Macklin trained his students to do this: "In the garden of his Drumcondra, Dublin house, two of his pupils would stroll down two parallel walks while Macklin walked in the middle. They would walk for ten paces, and then exchange bits of conversation. They would repeat this many times until Macklin was satisfied in every particular". In this way, Macklin drilled his students until they acquired an ease of speech and manner. To cope with projection in the theatres, Macklin would often recite from Milton's Paradise Lost or soliloquies from Macbeth or Othello, having his students to imitate him in clarity, speech, and volume. Appleton adds that "while he concentrated primarily on achieving clear and natural diction, he stressed as well the importance of mastering variety of tone and pause to indicate transitions of thought and associations of ideas". Macklin taught his students three fundamental pauses: moderate, longer, and grand. Each type of pause served an important function depending on the scene.

Macklin was one of the forerunners to stress the need to regularise rehearsals. Appleton states that "actors, compelled by the repertory system to know scores of parts, generally relied on conventional attitudes, gestures, and tones to carry them through a performance and felt little enthusiasm for this discipline. Sometimes they were absent from rehearsals. Often they arrived late, stumbled through their lines and drifted away". Macklin was not only concerned about his individual actors, but with the whole production, and so everyone had to come prepared and on time. This led to a relentless discipline unmatched in other students at the time. For the rest of his life, Macklin would continue to train his students with such intensity and passion and through them, make an important contribution to the English Theatre.

== Marriages ==
During the 1730s Macklin was involved in a relationship with an Irish actress. Her name was thought to be Ann Grace or Ann Grace Purvor. She was a noted actress and she assumed the name of Macklin although it is likely the pair never married. Their daughter, Maria Macklin (1733–1781), became a popular actress. Ann died on 28 December 1758 and he began an affair with his servant Elizabeth Jones, of Chester, whose age was matched to that of his daughter. They were married either on 13 February 1778, or 10 September 1759; sources differ.

== Legal problems ==
Macklin lived a tempestuous life, often involved in lawsuits, sometimes acting as his own lawyer. In 1735 he quarrelled with a fellow actor named Thomas Hallam, whom he accidentally killed by thrusting his cane through Hallam's eye. The pair had argued over a wig whilst performing a new farce, Trick for Trick. The incident occurred in the Scene Room of the Theatre Royal, Drury Lane, in front of many witnesses, and Macklin, after the sudden fit of temper, was sorry and arranged for a physician to attend to Hallam. The cane had pierced through Hallam's eye into his brain and he died one day later. Macklin was tried for murder, conducted his own defence and, though not acquitted, escaped with manslaughter. The punishment for manslaughter was the branding of a letter 'M' upon the hand, by this period not with a hot but with a cold iron, although there is no evidence that this was actually carried out on Macklin. In 1772 he sued the organizers of a riot among the theatregoers who had demanded that he be fired. He recovered £600, but chose to accept instead the defendants' purchase of £100 in tickets at three benefits for himself, his daughter and the management.

== Death and legacy ==
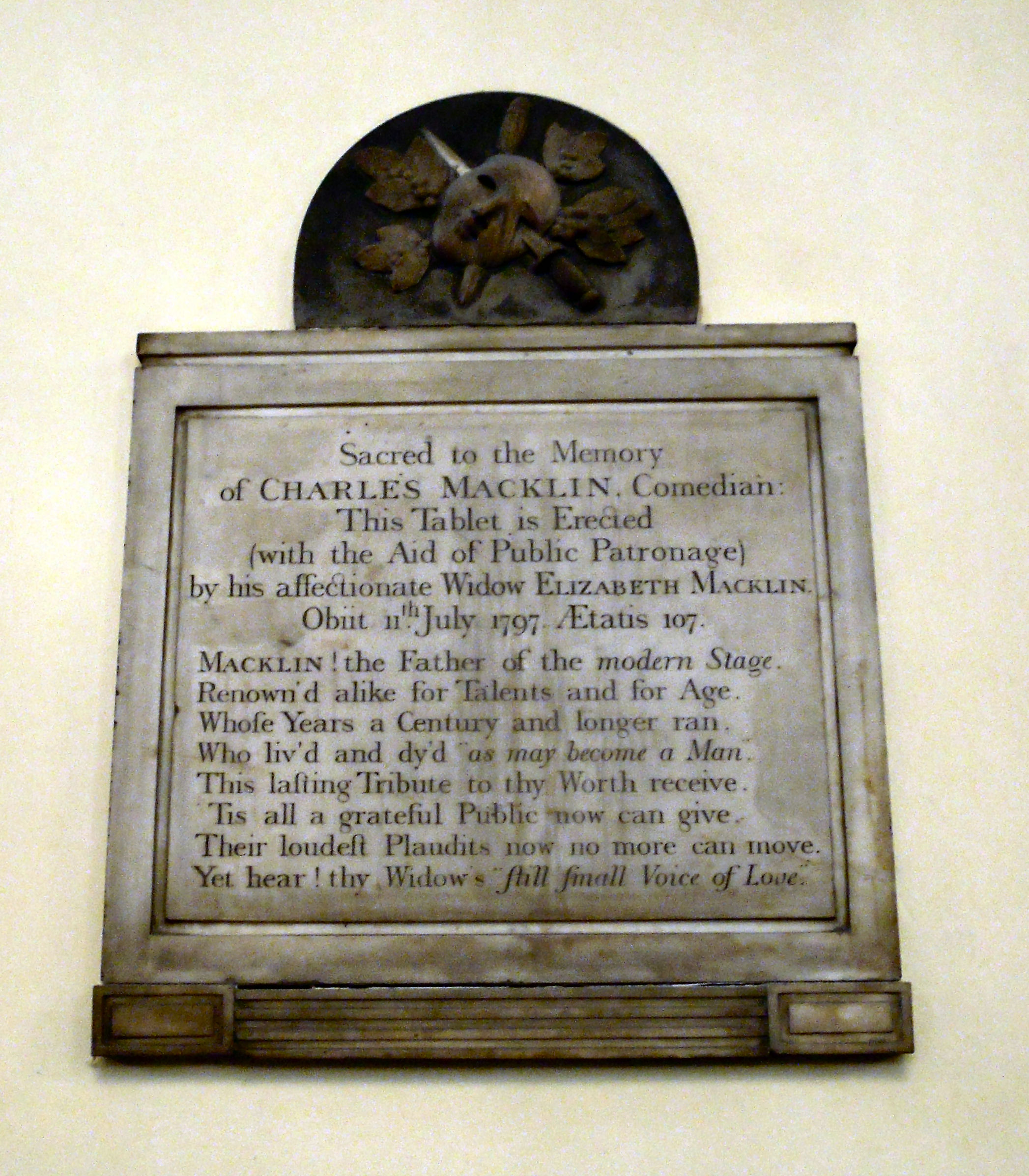
Macklin's memorial plaque in St Paul's in Covent Garden

He lived a long life and may have died a centenarian, although that is not without doubt. While his second wife gave his birth year as 1690 on the memorial tablet installed in St. Paul's Church, Covent Garden, making him 107 at his death; others have suggested that he was born in 1699 or 1710. His memorial shows a dagger piercing the eye of a theatrical mask, a contrite reference to his altercation with Thomas Hallam.

Macklin's famous role as Shylock and introduction of naturalistic acting would later influence realism in the 19th century. Macklin's drive and discipline to perfect himself as an actor and teacher still inspires theatre practitioners today. Macklin is remembered today in his native Inishowen, where the Charles Macklin Autumn School is held each October in the village of Culdaff.
