= David Moses Dyte =

English quill merchant (c. 1770–1830)

David Moses ben Meir Dyte
- Born: 1770
- Died: 1830 (aged 59–60)
- Occupation: merchant

David Moses ben Meir Dyte (c. 1770–1830) was an English Jewish quill merchant who distinguished himself by preventing the assassination attempt on George III by James Hadfield on 15 May 1800.

Dyte was attending Colley Cibber's play She Would and She Would Not at the Theatre Royal, Drury Lane when Hadfield fired a horsepistol at the King. Dyte, seated directly behind the shooter, struck the assailant and deflected the shot. It is said that Dyte asked as his sole reward the right to sell opera tickets, then a monopoly at the royal disposal. In 1802 he was appointed 'Purveyor of Pens and Quills to the Royal Household'. The incident was immortalised in the play Jew Dyte by Harold Rubinstein.

Dyte was the father of Henry Dyte, who served as Honorary Secretary to the Blind Society; and the grandfather of D. H. Dyte, Surgeon to the Jewish Board of Guardians, and Charles Dyte, a parliamentarian in the colony of Victoria.
