= Francis Gentleman =

18th-century Irish actor, poet, and dramatic writer

Francis Gentleman (23 October 1728 - 21 December 1784) was an Irish actor, poet, and dramatic writer of 18th century. He wrote several plays, dramatic works, poems and edited Shakspeare's plays for the stage.

== Biography ==
Gentleman was born at York St., Dublin, Ireland, on 23 October 1728 to an army captain. He received his education in Dublin and served in the army till dismissed in 1748.

While at school, he met John Dexter and Henry Mossop; they shared an interest in the theatre, and after leaving the army, Gentleman took to the stage. He first appeared in Thomas Southerne's stage play Oroonoko - in the character of Aboan. Later, he appeared in Dublin, London, Edinburgh, and many more. He started his career of writing for the stage in England, notably, tragic works like Sejanus and The Sultan of Love and Fame; and comedies like The Modish Wife and The Tobacconist. His writings were not successful or admired.

He died at the age of 56 on 21 December 1784.

== Family ==
He was married to Ruth and he was a father.

== Selected works ==
- Sejanus (1751)
- Narcissa and Eliza (1754)
- A Trip to the Moon (1765)
- The Sultan of Love and Fame (1770)
- The Dramatic Censor (1770)
- The Censor (1770)
- Tobacconist (1771)
- The Modish Wife (1773)
