= Theatre Royal, Drury Lane =

West End theatre in London

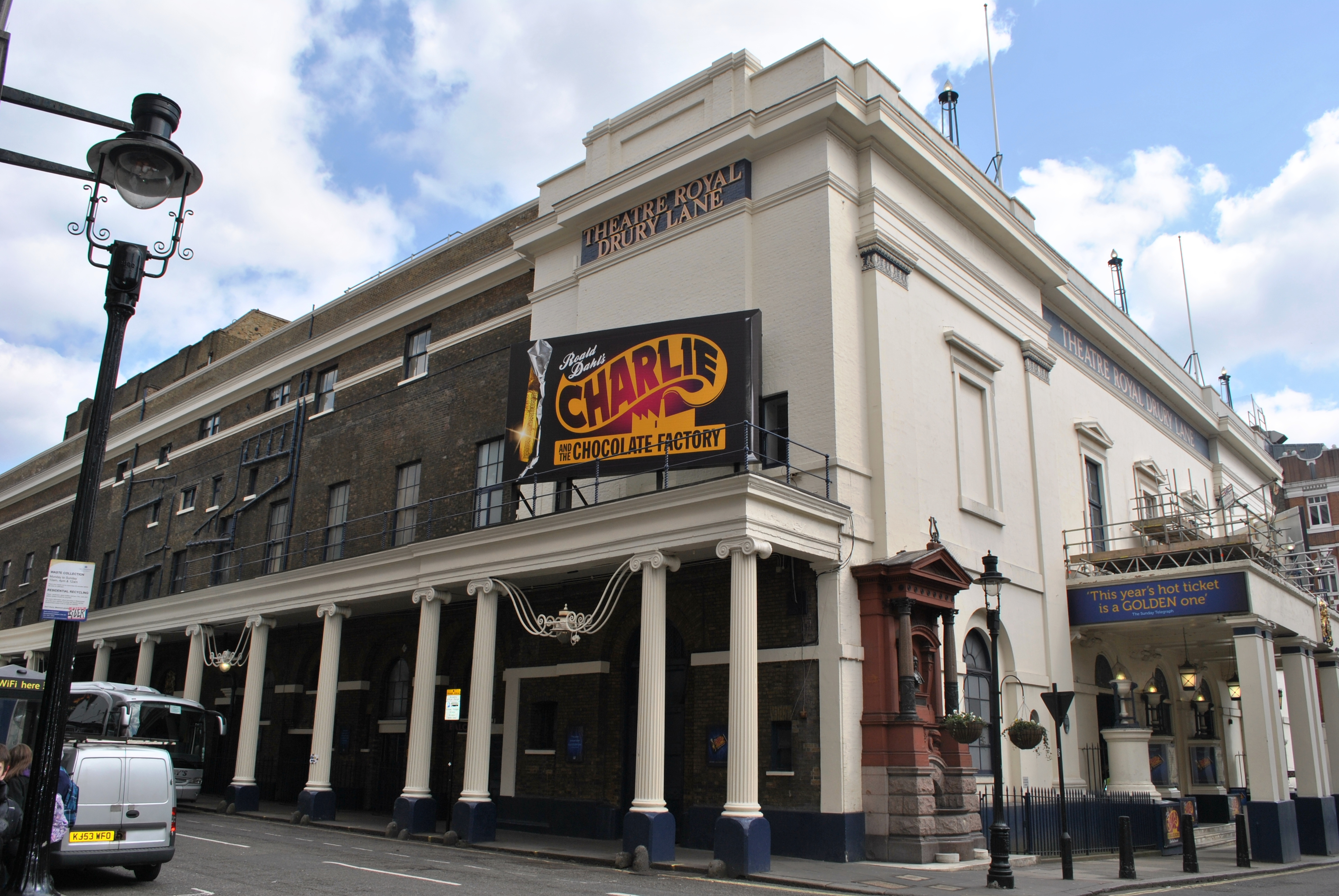
- Exterior of venue during a production of Charlie and the Chocolate Factory
- Interactive map of Theatre Royal, Drury Lane
- Address: Catherine Street; London, WC2; England
- Coordinates: 51°30′47″N 00°07′13″W
- Owner: LW Theatres
- Capacity: 1,996 (4 levels)
- Designation: Grade I listed
- Production: Jesus Christ Superstar
- Public transit: Covent Garden

Construction
- Opened: 1663; 363 years ago (original structure)
- Rebuilt: 1674; 1794 (Henry Holland); 1812 (Benjamin Dean Wyatt)

Website
- lwtheatres.co.uk/theatres/theatre-royal-drury-lane/

The Theatre Royal, Drury Lane, commonly known as Drury Lane, is a West End theatre and Grade I listed building in Covent Garden, London, England. The building faces Catherine Street (earlier named Bridges or Brydges Street) and backs onto Drury Lane. The present building, opened in 1812, is the most recent of four theatres that have stood at the location since 1663, making it the oldest theatre site in London still in use. According to the author Peter Thomson, for its first two centuries, Drury Lane could "reasonably have claimed to be London's leading theatre". For most of that time, it was one of a handful of patent London theatres, granted monopoly rights to the production of "legitimate" drama (meaning spoken plays, rather than opera, dance, concerts, or plays with music).

The first theatre on the site was built at the behest of Thomas Killigrew in the early 1660s, when theatres were allowed to reopen during the English Restoration. It was initially known as "Theatre Royal in Bridges Street". The theatre's proprietors hired prominent actors who performed at the theatre on a regular basis, including Nell Gwyn and Charles Hart. In 1672, the theatre caught fire, and Killigrew built a larger theatre on the same plot, renamed the "Theatre Royal in Drury Lane", which opened in 1674. This building lasted nearly 120 years, under the leaderships of Colley Cibber, David Garrick and Richard Brinsley Sheridan, the last of whom employed Joseph Grimaldi as the theatre's resident Clown.

In 1791, under Sheridan's management, the building was demolished to make way for a larger theatre which opened in 1794. This new Drury Lane survived for 15 years before burning down in 1809. The building that stands today opened in 1812. It has been the residency of well known actors including Edmund Kean, comedian Dan Leno and the musical composer and performer Ivor Novello. From the Second World War, the theatre has primarily hosted long runs of musicals, including Oklahoma!, My Fair Lady, 42nd Street and Miss Saigon, the theatre's longest-running show. The theatre is owned by the composer Andrew Lloyd Webber. Since January 2019, the venue has had ongoing renovations, and in July 2021, it reopened after over two years of extensive work and closures related to the COVID-19 pandemic. Disney's Frozen made its West End debut at Drury Lane the same year.

== First theatre: Theatre Royal, Bridges Street (1663) ==
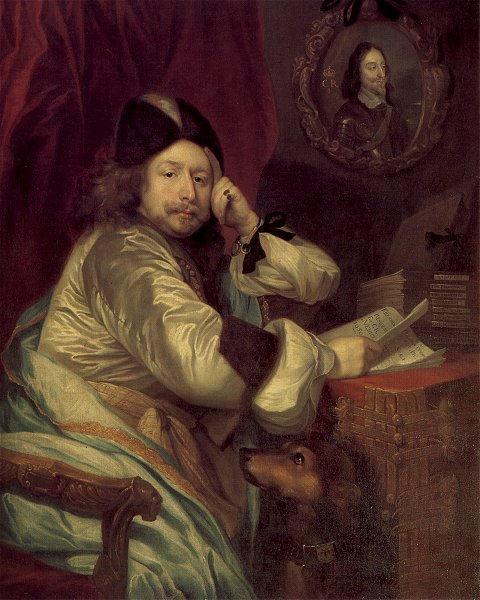
Thomas Killigrew as he appeared in 1650

A playhouse known as the Cockpit Theatre used by Queen Anne's Men on Drury Lane was targeted by rioting apprentices on 4 March 1617. After the eleven-year-long Puritan Interregnum, which had seen the banning of pastimes regarded as frivolous, such as theatre, the English monarchy was restored to the throne with the return of Charles II in 1660. Soon after, Charles issued Letters Patent to two parties licensing the formation of new acting companies. One of these went to Thomas Killigrew, whose company became known as the King's Company, and who built a new theatre in Drury Lane. The Letters Patent also granted the two companies a shared monopoly on the public performance of legitimate drama in London; this monopoly was challenged in the 18th century by new venues and by a certain slipperiness in the definition of "legitimate drama," but remained legally in place until 1843. The new playhouse, architect unknown, opened on 7 May 1663 and was known from the placement of the entrance as the "Theatre Royal in Bridges Street." (Note: The single roadway now named Catherine Street was for most of its history named Catherine Street in its southern portion and Bridges (or Brydges) Street in its northern.) It went by other names as well, including the "King's Playhouse." The building was a three-tiered wooden structure, 112 ft (34 m) long and 59 ft (18 m) wide; it could hold an audience of 700. Set well back from the broader streets, the theatre was accessed by narrow passages between surrounding buildings.

The King's Company was forced to commission the technically advanced and expensive Theatre Royal playhouse by the success of the rival Duke's Company, which was drawing fascinated crowds with their "moveable" or "changeable" scenery and visually gorgeous productions at the former Lisle's Tennis Court at Lincoln's Inn Fields. Imitating the innovations at Lincoln's Inn Fields, the Theatre Royal also featured moveable scenery with wings or shutters that could be smoothly changed between or even within acts. When not in use, the shutters rested out of sight behind the sides of the proscenium arch, which also served as a visual frame for the on-stage happenings. The picture-frame-like separation between audience and performance was a new phenomenon in English theatre, though it had been found on the Continent earlier. Theatre design in London remained ambivalent about the merits of the "picture-box" stage, and for many decades to come, London theatres including Drury Lane had large forestages protruding beyond the arch, often including the thrust stages found in the Elizabethan theatres. The players could still step forward and bridge the distance between performer and audience, and in addition, it was not unusual for audience members to mount the stage themselves.

Killigrew's investment in the new playhouse put the two companies on a level as far as technical resources were concerned, but the offerings at the Theatre Royal nevertheless continued to be dominated by actor-driven "talk" drama, contrasting with William Davenant's baroque spectacles and operas at Lincoln's Inn Fields. Internal power structures were the main reason for this difference: while Davenant skilfully commanded a docile young troupe, Killigrew's authority over his veteran actors was far from absolute. Experienced actors Michael Mohun (who Pepys called "the best actor in the world") and Charles Hart held out for shares and good contracts in the King's Company. Such a division of power between the patentee, Killigrew, and his chief actors led to frequent conflicts that hampered the Theatre Royal as a business venture. Nevertheless, it was mostly at the struggling Theatre Royal, rather than at the efficiently run Lincoln's Inn Fields, that the plays were acted that are classics today. This applies especially to the new form Restoration comedy, dominated in the 1660s by William Wycherley and the Theatre Royal's house dramatist John Dryden. Actors such as Hart and Charles II's mistress Nell Gwyn developed and refined the famous scenes of repartee, banter and flirtation in Dryden's and Wycherley's comedies. With the appearance of actresses for the first time at Drury Lane and Lincoln's Inn Fields in the 1660s, British playwrights wrote parts for outspoken female characters, daring love scenes and provocative breeches roles. In any case, the competition between the King's Company and the Duke's was good for the rebirth and development of English drama. The king himself frequently attended the theatre's productions, as did Samuel Pepys, whose private diaries provide much of what we know of London theatre-going in the 1660s. The day after the Theatre Royal opened, Pepys attended a performance of Francis Beaumont and John Fletcher's The Humorous Lieutenant. He has this to say in his diary:

The house is made with extraordinary good contrivance, and yet hath some faults, as the narrowness of the passages in and out of the Pitt, and the distance from the stage to the boxes, which I am confident cannot hear; but for all other things it is well, only, above all, the musique being below, and most of it sounding under the very stage, there is no hearing of the bases at all, nor very well of the trebles, which sure must be mended.

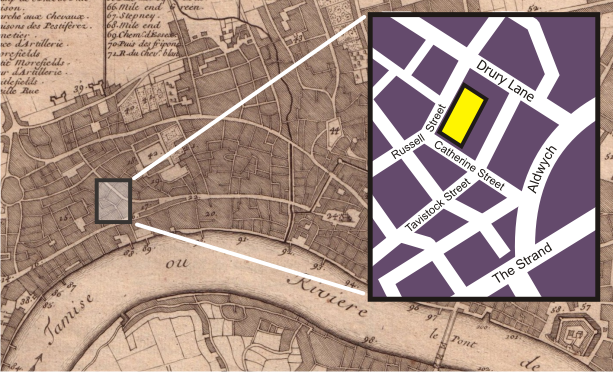
location of the Theatre Royal on a map of London from 1700; the inset shows the streets as they are in 2006.

Performances usually began at 3 pm to take advantage of the daylight: the main floor for the audience, the pit, had no roof in order to let in the light. A glazed dome was built over the opening, but according to one of Pepys' diary entries, the dome was not entirely effective at keeping out the elements: he and his wife were forced to leave the theatre to take refuge from a hail storm. Green baize cloth covered the benches in the pit and served to decorate the boxes (additionally ornamented with gold-tooled leather) and even the stage itself. The backless green benches in the pit were in a semicircular arrangement facing the stage, according to a May 1663 letter from one Monsieur de Maonconys: "All benches of the pit, where people of rank also sit, are shaped in a semi-circle, each row higher than the next." The three galleries formed a semicircle around the floor seats; both the first and second galleries were divided up into boxes.

The Great Plague of London struck in the summer of 1665, and the Theatre Royal, along with all other public entertainment, was shut down by order of the Crown on 5 June. It remained closed for 18 months until the autumn of 1666, during which time it received at least a little interior renovation, including widening of the stage. Located well to the west of the City boundary, the theatre was unaffected by the Great Fire of London, which raged through the City in September 1666, but it burned down six years later on 25 January 1672.

== Second theatre: Theatre Royal, Drury Lane (1674) ==
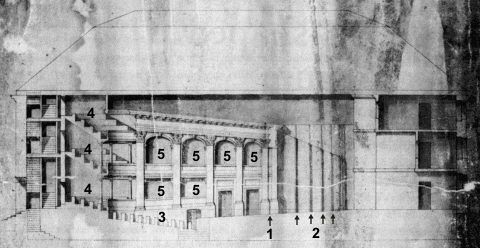
Unsigned longitudinal section showing a design attributed to Christopher Wren. 1: Proscenium arch. 2: Four pairs of shutters across the stage. 3: Pit. 4: Galleries. 5: Boxes.

During the 20th century, one illustration was repeatedly – and wrongly – published as "Christopher Wren, design for the Theatre Royal Drury Lane, 1674". Since 1964, this presumption has been disputed by scholars. Careful inspection of the drawing at All Souls' College, Oxford Library shows that it has one pencil inscription: "Play house" [sic], which may have been added by a librarian or by anyone else. No sign of a signature (by Wren or anyone else) or a date appears anywhere on the drawing. Robert D. Hume of Penn State University explained that use of the drawing "rests almost entirely on the supposition that the so-called "Wren section" at All Souls represents this theatre. It could just as easily be a discarded sketch unconnected to Drury Lane in any way."

Comparative evidence for Drury Lane's 1674 design can be found in the Theatre Royal, Bristol, built in 1766, whose design was modelled, in part, on Drury Lane's. The site measured 112 ft (34 m) east-west and 59 ft (18 m) north-south. The building was smaller than this, as reliable surveys and maps of the period show three passageways measuring between 5 and 10 ft (1.5 and 3.0 m) wide surrounding the Theatre Royal on three sides. The building probably measured between 40 and 50 ft (12 and 15 m) wide (the average width of all "Restoration" Theatres) and between 90 and 100 ft (27 and 30 m) long. Architect Robert Adam designed Drury Lane's 1674 interior. The theatre was managed, from 1747 to Adam's retirement in the 1770s, by David Garrick.

The King's Company never recovered financially from the loss of the old Theatre Royal Bridges Street. The cost of constructing the new theatre, replacing their costumes and scenery lost in the fire and competitive pressure from the rival Duke's Company contributed to its decline. Eventually, in 1682, the King's Company merged with the Duke's. The 1674 Theatre Royal building contained a warren of rooms, including storage space and dressing rooms used by the management and performers, nearly seventy people in total, as well as some fifty technical staff members. Additionally three rooms were provided for scripts, including a library for their storage, a separate room for copying actors' parts and a special library for the theatre's account books, ledger books and music scores. This jumble of rooms often made communication among various departments difficult, a problem that Garrick corrected during his tenure as manager. The entire complex occupied 13,134 sq ft (1,220 m^{2}) bounded by Drury Lane (east), Brydges Street (west), Great Russell Street (north) and Little Russell Street (south).

From 1674, theatregoers accessed the Drury Lane via a long ten-foot-wide passageway from Bridges Street. The passageway opened onto a yard (previously a "Riding Yard") in which the theatre stood. It is likely that the yard remained open to the sky at this date, on three sides of the Theatre Royal walls. Henri Misson, a visitor from France, offers a description of the theatre in 1698: his use of the word "amphitheatre" supports the view that Drury Lane had a circular line of boxes surrounding its pit:

The Pit is an Amphitheatre, fill'd with Benches without Backboards, and adorn'd and cover'd with green Cloth. Men of Quality, particularly the younger Sort, some Ladies of Reputation and Virtue, and abundance of Damsels that haunt for Prey, sit all together in this Place, Higgledy-piggledy, chatter, toy, play, hear, hear not. Farther up, against the Wall, under the first Gallery and just opposite to the Stage, rises another Amphitheatre, which is taken by persons of the best Quality, among whom are generally very few Men. The Galleries, whereof there are only two Rows, are fill'd with none but ordinary People, particularly the Upper one.

As Misson points out, the seating was divided by class, and tickets were priced accordingly. Box seats, used by the nobility and wealthy gentry, cost 5 shillings; the benches in the pit where some gentry sat, but also critics and scholars, cost 3 shillings; tradesmen and professionals occupied the first gallery with seats costing 2 shillings, while servants and other "ordinary people", as Misson refers to them, occupied the 1 shilling seats of the upper gallery. Seats were not numbered and were offered on a "first come, first served" basis, leading many members of the gentry to send servants to reserve seats well ahead of performances. The stage was 45 ft (14 m) wide and 30 ft (9.1 m) deep with a raked floor from the footlights to the backdrop. The angle of the rake rose one inch for every 24 in (610 mm) of horizontal stage. The stage floor included grooves for wings and flats in addition to trap doors in the floor. The proscenium arch covered the stage equipment above the stage that included a pair of girondels – large wheels holding many candles used to counteract the light from the footlights. Towards the latter part of the 18th century, doors were placed on either side of the stage, and a series of small spikes traced the edge of the stage apron to prevent audiences from climbing onto the stage. At the very back of the stage, a wide door opened to reveal Drury Lane.

An added difficulty for Killigrew and his sons Thomas and Charles was the political unrest of 1678–1684 with the Popish Plot and the Exclusion Bill crisis distracting potential audiences from things theatrical. This affected both the king's and the duke's companies, but most of all the king's, which had no profit margin to carry them through the lean years. In 1682, the companies merged, or rather, the king's was absorbed by the duke's. Led at the time by Thomas Betterton, the United Company, as it was now called, chose Drury Lane as their production house, leaving the Duke's Company's theatre in Dorset Garden closed for a time. In 1688, Betterton was removed from managerial control by Alexander Davenant, son of William Davenant, the original patent holder for the Duke's Company. Davenant's management (with Charles Killigrew) proved brief and disastrous, and by 1693 he was fleeing to the Canary Islands in the wake of embezzlement charges. The Theatre Royal found itself in the hands of lawyer Christopher Rich for the next 16 years.

Neither Davenant's nor Killigrew's sons were much better than crooks, and Rich attempted to recoup their depredations of the company's resources by cost-cutting tyranny, pitting actor against actor and slashing salaries. By 1695, the actors, including day-to-day manager and acting legend Thomas Betterton, were alienated and humiliated enough to walk out and set up a cooperative company of their own. Nine men and six women departed, all of them established professional performers, including such draws as tragedian Elizabeth Barry and comedian Anne Bracegirdle, leaving the United Company – henceforth known as the "Patent Company" – in "a very despicable condition," according to an anonymous contemporary pamphlet:

The disproportion was so great at parting, that it was almost impossible, in Drury Lane, to muster up a sufficient number to take in all the parts of any play; and of them so few were tolerable, that a play must of necessity be damned, that had not extraordinary favour from the audience. No fewer than sixteen (most of the old standing) went away; and with them the very beauty and vigour of the stage; they who were left being for the most part learners, boys and girls, a very unequal match for them that revolted.

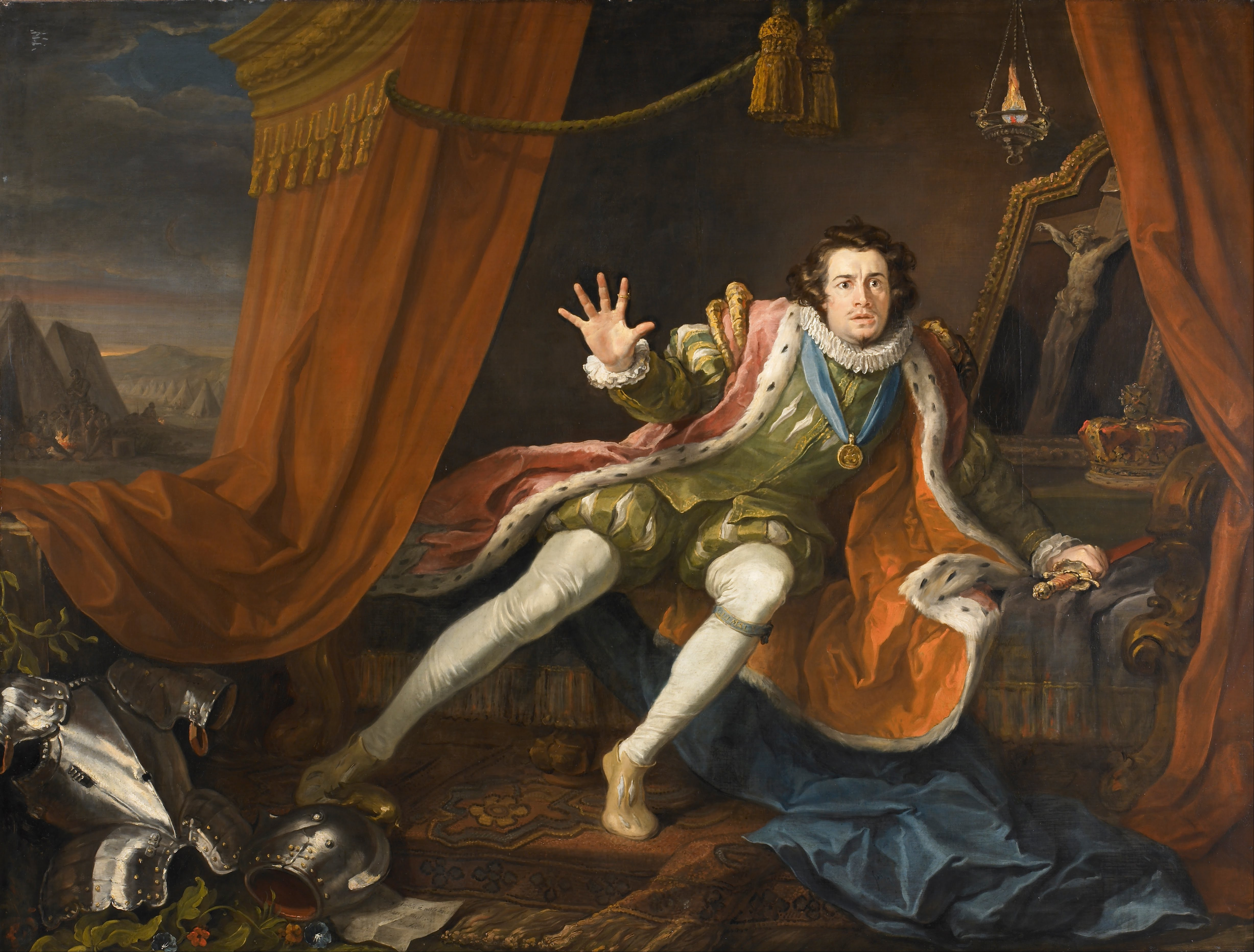
David Garrick, the theatre manager 1747–1776, is portrayed in the title role of Richard III in this painting by William Hogarth.

A private letter from 19 November 1696 reported that Drury Lane "has no company at all, and unless a new play comes out on Saturday revives their reputation, they must break." The new play is assumed to have been John Vanbrugh's The Relapse, and it turned out the success the company needed. Christopher Rich continued as its head until 1709, when the patent in question was actually revoked amid a complex tangle of political machinations. A lawyer named William Collier was briefly given the right to mount productions in Drury Lane, but by 1710 the troupe was in the hands of the actors Colley Cibber, Robert Wilks, and Thomas Doggett – a triumvirate that eventually found themselves sharply satirised in Alexander Pope's Dunciad. In 1713, Barton Booth replaced Doggett. On 2 March 1717 was the premiere of the ballet The Loves of Mars and Venus choreographed by John Weaver, and was the first ballet to be performed in England.

Cibber was the de facto leader of the triumvirate, and he led the theatre through a controversial but generally successful period until 1733, when he sold his controlling interest to John Highmore. It is likely that the sale was at a vastly inflated price and that Colley's goal was simply to get out of debts and make a profit (see Robert Lowe in his edition of Cibber's Apology). Members of the troupe at the time were most displeased; an actor's revolt was organised and executed; Charles Fleetwood came to control the theatre. Fleetwood's tenure was tumultuous; his abolition of the practice of allowing footmen free access to the upper gallery led to riots in 1737, and Fleetwood's gambling problems entangled the theatre in his own financial difficulties. It was during this period that actor Charles Macklin (a native of Inishowen in County Donegal in Ulster) rose to fame, propelled by a singular performance as Shylock in an early 1741 production of The Merchant of Venice, in which he introduced a realistic, naturalistic style of acting, abandoning the artificial bombast typical of dramatic roles prior.

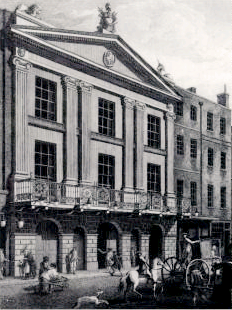
The facade on Bridges Street. Added in 1775, this gave the theatre its first on-street entrance.

In 1747, Fleetwood's playhouse patent expired. The theatre and a patent renewal were purchased by actor David Garrick (who had trained under Macklin earlier) and partner James Lacy. Garrick served as manager and lead actor of the theatre until roughly 1766 and continued on in the management role for another ten years after that. He is remembered as one of the great stage actors and is especially associated with advancing the Shakespearean tradition in English theatre – during his time at Drury Lane, the company mounted at least 24 of Shakespeare's plays. Some of Shakespeare's surge in popularity during this period can be traced to the Licensing Act 1737, which mandated governmental approval of any play before it could be performed and thereby created something of a vacuum of new material to perform. Garrick shared the stage with company including Peg Woffington, Susannah Cibber, Hannah Pritchard, Kitty Clive, Spranger Barry, Richard Yates, and Ned Shuter. It was under Garrick's management that spectators were for the first time barred from the stage itself.

Garrick commissioned Robert Adam and his brother James to renovate the theatre's interior, which they did in 1775. Their additions included an ornate ceiling and a stucco facade facing Bridges Street. This facade was the first time any structure that might be considered part of the theatre proper actually abutted the street: the building, like the 1663 original, had been built in the centre of the block, hemmed in by other structures. The narrow passage from Bridges street to the theatre now became an interior hallway; some theatre office space also went up behind the new facade.

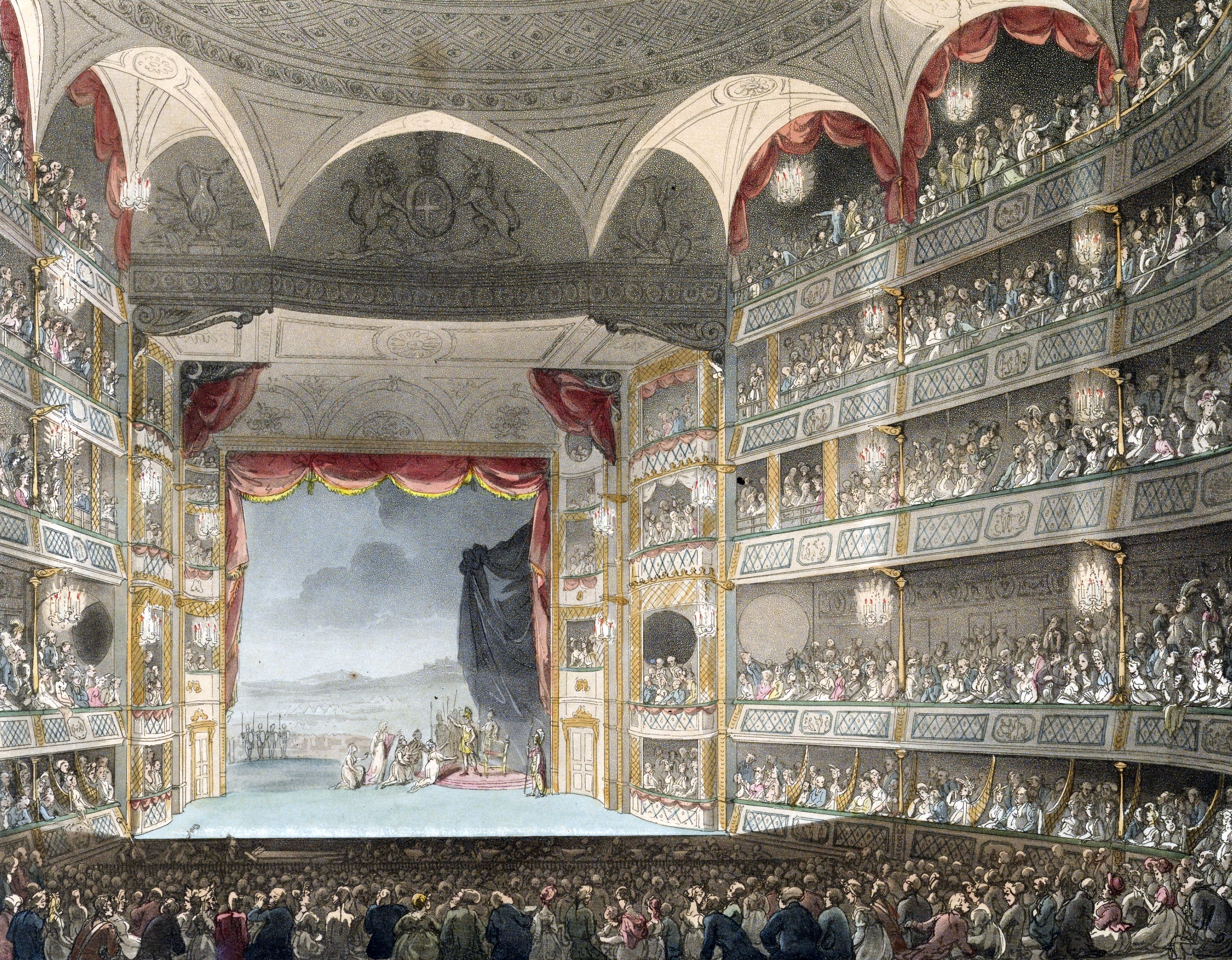
The interior of the third and largest theatre to stand at Drury Lane, c. 1808

With a series of farewell performances, Garrick left the stage in 1776 and sold his shares in the theatre to the Irish playwright Richard Brinsley Sheridan. Sheridan and his partners, Thomas Linley the elder and Doctor James Ford (court physician to King George III), completed their purchase of Drury Lane two years later, and Sheridan owned it until 1809. Sheridan premiered his own comedy of manners The School for Scandal in 1777. Active management of the theatre was carried out by several parties during Sheridan's ownership, including himself, his father Thomas, and, from 1788 to 1796 and 1800 to 1802, the popular actor John Philip Kemble. Linley took up the post of musical director at the theatre, receiving a retainer of £500 per annum.

Sheridan employed dozens of children as extras at Drury Lane including Joseph Grimaldi who made his stage debut at the theatre in 1780. Grimaldi became best known for his development of the modern day white-face clown and popularised the role of Clown in pantomimes and harlequinades. Towards the end of the 1790s, Grimaldi starred in Robinson Crusoe, which confirmed him as a key Christmas pantomime performer. Many pantomimes followed, but his career at Drury Lane became turbulent, and he left the theatre for good in 1806.

== Third theatre (1794) ==
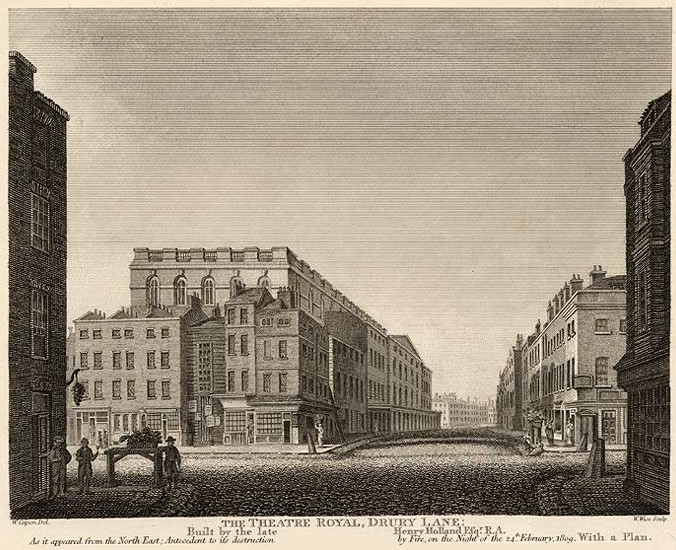
The theatre pictured as it was in 1809 (from an 1811 engraving). The view is from the north-east, looking down Russell Street at its intersection with Drury Lane. This shows the rear of the theatre with its dressing rooms and stage door.

The theatre was in need of updating by the end of the 18th century and was demolished in 1791, with the company moving temporarily to the new King's Theatre, in the Haymarket. A third theatre was designed by Henry Holland and opened on 12 March 1794. In the design of the theatre boxes, Henry Holland asked John Linnell for assistance. The designs by Linnell survive in the V&A Print Room – there are also designs by Henry Holland and Charles Heathcote Tatham who were involved in the design process. This was a cavernous theatre, accommodating more than 3,600 spectators. The motivation behind building on such a large scale? In the words of one owner:

I was aware of the very popular notion that our theatres ought to be very small; but it appeared to me that if that very popular notion should be suffered to proceed too far it would in every way deteriorate our dramatic performances depriving the proprietors of that revenue which is indispensable to defray the heavy expenses of such a concern.

New technology facilitated the expansion: iron columns replaced bulky wood, supporting five tiers of galleries. The stage was large, too: 83 ft (25 m) wide and 92 ft (28 m) deep. Holland, the architect, said it was "on a larger scale than any other theatre in Europe." Except for churches, it was the tallest building in London.

The "very popular notion that our theatres ought to be very small" proved hard to overcome. Various accounts from the period bemoan the mammoth size of the new theatre, longing for the "warm close observant seats of Old Drury," as one May 1794 theatregoer put it. (Note: John Byng, later Viscount Torrington.) Actress Sarah Siddons, then part of the Drury Lane company, called it "a wilderness of a place" (and left Drury Lane along with her brother John Philip Kemble in 1803). Not only was any sense of intimacy and connection to the company on stage lost, but the very size of the theatre put a great deal of the audience at such a distance from the stage so as to make hearing a player's voice quite difficult. To compensate, the productions mounted in the new theatre tended more toward spectacle than the spoken word. An example of such a spectacle is a 1794 production that featured real water flowing down a rocky stream into a lake large enough on which to row a boat. This water issued from tanks in the attics above the house, which were installed – along with a much-touted iron safety curtain – as proof against fire.

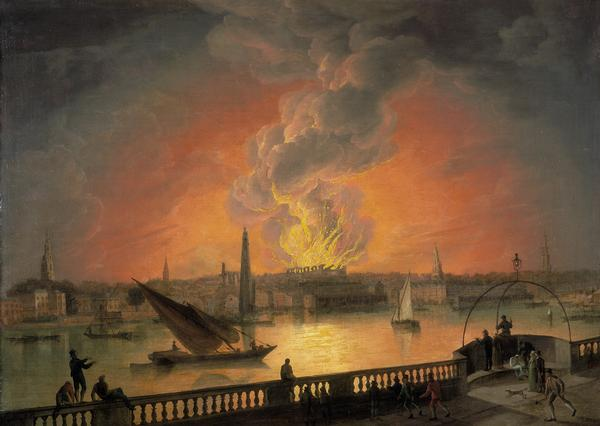
After standing only 15 years, the third Drury Lane theatre building burned down on 24 February 1809. This painting from the period, artist unknown, shows the view of the fire from the Westminster Bridge.

Richard Sheridan continued as theatre owner during the entire lifetime of this third building. He had grown in stature as a statesman during this time, but troubled finances were to be his undoing. The 1794 rebuilding had cost double the original estimate of £80,000 (equivalent to £9.2 million in 2025), and Sheridan bore the entirety of the debt. Productions were more expensive to mount in the larger structure, and increased audience revenues failed to make up the difference.

An assassination attempt against King George III took place at the theatre on 15 May 1800. James Hadfield fired two pistol shots from the pit toward the king, sitting in the royal box. The shots missed by inches, Hadfield having been jostled by a Mr Dyte. Hadfield was quickly subdued, and George, apparently unruffled, ordered the performance to continue.

The comedy actor John Bannister became acting manager in 1802. With Sheridan's son Tom, and in the circle of Richard Wroughton (stage-manager), William Dowton, Michael Kelly, Tom Dibdin and their likes, he helped to see the Theatre Royal through its next catastrophe. On 24 February 1809, despite the previously mentioned fire safety precautions, the theatre burned down. On being encountered drinking a glass of wine in the street while watching the fire, R.B. Sheridan was famously reported to have said: "A man may surely be allowed to take a glass of wine by his own fireside." Already on the shakiest financial ground, Sheridan was ruined entirely by the loss of the building. He turned to brewer Samuel Whitbread, an old friend, for help. As well as investing strongly in the project, Whitbread agreed to head a committee that would manage the company and oversee the rebuilding of the theatre, but asked Sheridan to withdraw from management himself, which he did entirely by 1811.

== Modern theatre (1812–present) ==
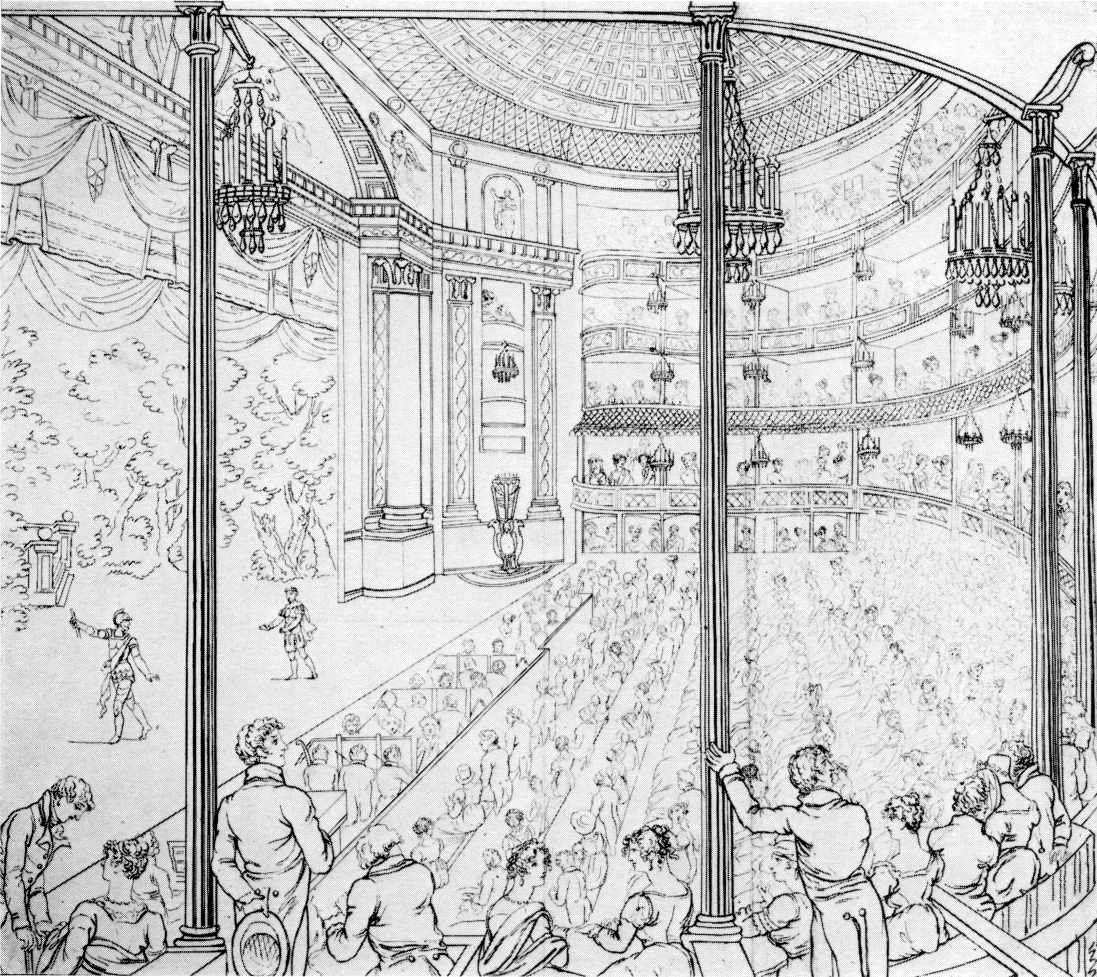
The present-day Theatre Royal in Drury Lane, sketched when it was new, in 1813

The present Theatre Royal in Drury Lane, designed by Benjamin Dean Wyatt on behalf of the committee led by Whitbread, opened on 10 October 1812 with a production of Hamlet featuring Robert Elliston in the title role of Prince Hamlet. The new theatre made some concessions toward intimacy, seating 3,060 people, about 550 fewer than the earlier building (though this size is still considered an extremely large theatre). On 6 September 1817, gas lighting was extended from the audience area to the stage, making it the first British theatre to be gaslit throughout. In 1820, the portico that still stands at the theatre's front entrance on Catherine Street was added, and in 1822 the interior underwent a significant remodelling. The colonnade running down the Russell Street side of the building was added in 1831.

Productions relying more on scenery and effects than on dialogue and acting remained commonplace in the new facility. The 1823 production of Cataract of the Ganges had a finale featuring a horseback escape up a flowing cataract "with fire raging all around." Effects for an 1829 production were produced by hydraulic apparatus that reportedly could discharge 39 tons of water.

There were those concerned that the theatre was failing in its role as one of the very few permitted to show legitimate drama. Management of the theatre after it reopened in 1813 fell to Samuel James Arnold, overseen by an amateur board of directors and a subcommittee focusing on the theatre as a centre for national culture. (Lord Byron was briefly on this subcommittee, from June 1815 until leaving England in April 1816.) Actor Edmund Kean was the on-stage highlight; like Macklin before him, he made his reputation as Shylock, premiering in the role in 1814. Kean remained until 1820 through praise and notorious disputes with local playwrights such as Charles Bucke.

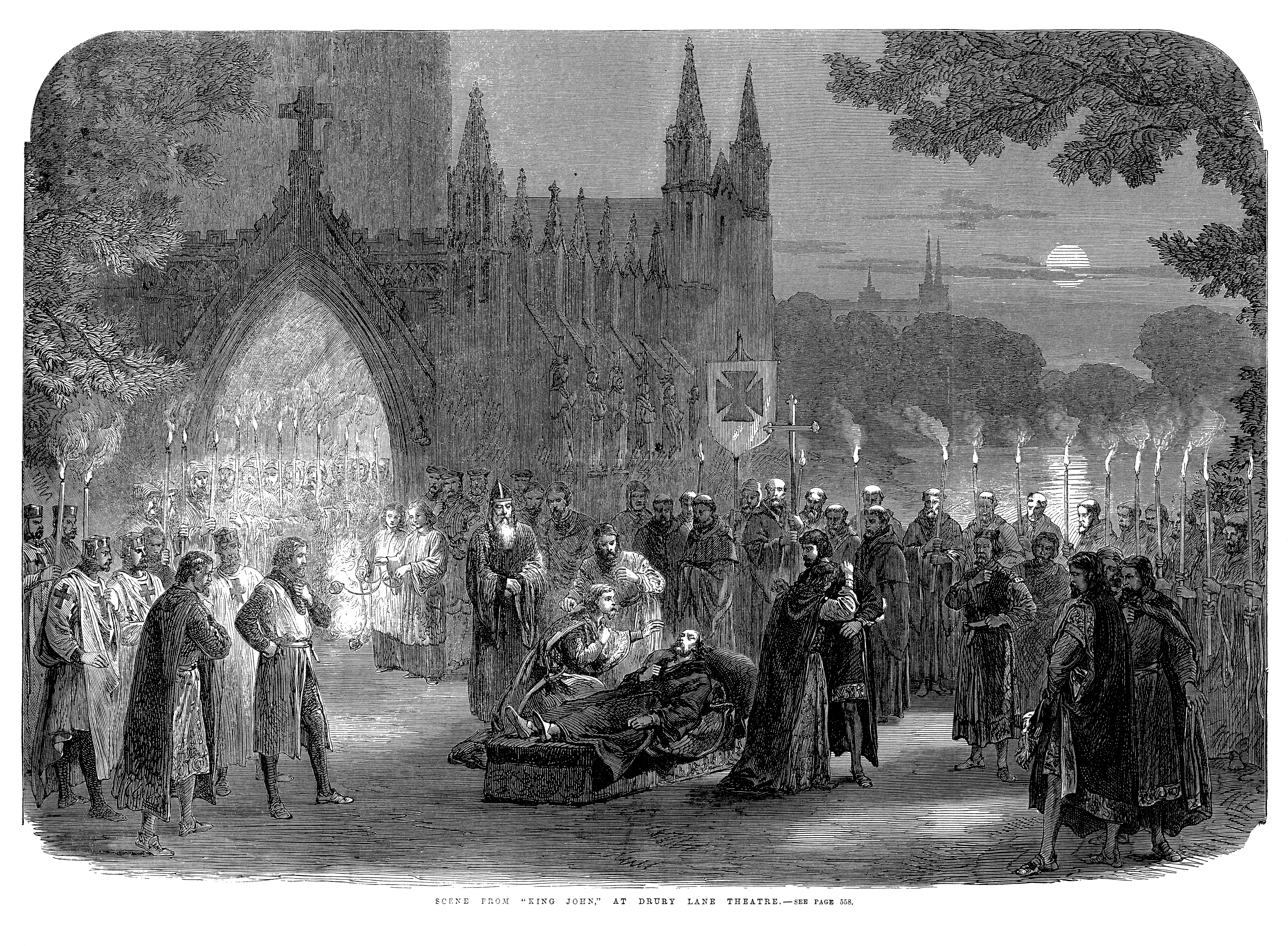
The last scene of an 1865 performance of Shakespeare's King John at the theatre, as depicted in the Illustrated London News

Elliston leased the theatre from 1819 until he went bankrupt in 1826. An American, Stephen Price of New York City's Park Theatre, followed from 1826 to 1830.

Through most of the remainder of the 19th century, Drury Lane passed quickly from one proprietor to another. A colonnade was added to the Russell Street frontage, in 1831, by architect Samuel Beazley. In 1833, Alfred Bunn gained control of both Drury Lane and Covent Garden, managing the former from 1833 to 1839, and again from 1843 to 1850. Following the lead of the Lyceum Theatre, London, Bunn championed English opera, rather than the Italian operas that had played earlier at the theatre. These included Fair Rosamond and Farinelli by John Barnett; a series of twelve operas by Michael Balfe including The Maid of Artois and The Bohemian Girl; Maritana and others by William Vincent Wallace and several by Julius Benedict. In 1837, actor-manager Samuel Phelps (1804–1878) joined the company at Drury Lane, appearing with William Charles Macready, the gifted actor-manager in several Shakespeare plays. He also created the role of Captain Channel in Douglas Jerrold's melodrama, The Prisoner of War (1842), and of Lord Tresham in Robert Browning's A Blot in the 'Scutcheon (1843). Macready was briefly manager in 1841–1843, putting significant reforms in place. Nevertheless, most productions there were financial disasters.

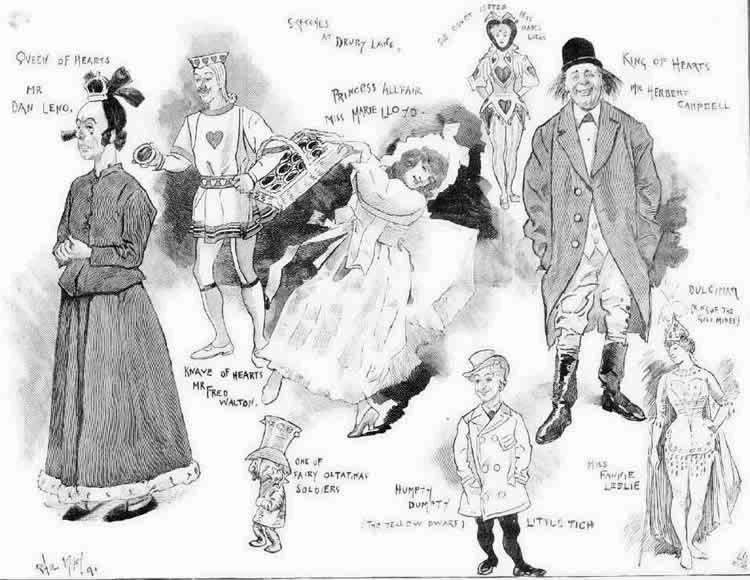
Pantomime characters from the Augustus Harris era including Dan Leno, Marie Lloyd and Little Tich by Phil May

The theatrical monopoly first bestowed by Royal Letters Patent 183 years earlier was abolished by the Theatres Act 1843, but the patent had been largely toothless for decades and this had little immediate effect. On the other hand, other theatres, used to presenting musical entertainments, continued to do so, and Drury Lane continued as one of the most accepted venues for legitimate theatre. The 19th-century run of financial and artistic failures at Drury Lane was interrupted by four plays produced over a twenty-five-year period by the actor-playwright Dion Boucicault: The Queen of Spades (1851), Eugenie (1855), Formosa (1869), and The Shaughraun (1875). But this period of general decline culminated with F. B. Chatterton's 1878 resignation; in his words, "Shakespeare spells ruin, and Byron bankruptcy." During the 19th century, Drury Lane staged ballet as well, with performers including Italy's Carlotta Grisi.

One famous musical director of Drury Lane was the eccentric French conductor and composer of light music Louis-Antoine Jullien (1812–1860), who successfully invited Berlioz to visit London and give concerts in the Theatre.

The house's fortunes rose again under the management of Augustus Harris from 1879. In the 1880s and 1890s, the theatre hosted many of the productions of the Carl Rosa Opera Company. Harris focused increased resources on the theatre's annual pantomime, beginning at Christmas 1888, adding a well-known comedian, Dan Leno. These spectacular Christmas shows were a major success, often playing into March. They were choreographed by the theatre's dance master, John D'Auban. Many of the designs under Harris were created by the imaginative designer C. Wilhelm, including the spectacular drama, Armada (1888), and many of the pantomimes. Productions relying on spectacle became the norm at Drury Lane under the managements first of Harris, from 1879 to 1896, and then of Arthur Collins from 1896 to 1923. Examples include the 1909 play, The Whip, which featured not only a train crash, but also twelve horses recreating the 2,000 Guineas Stakes on an on-stage treadmill. Jimmy Glover, director of music from 1893 to 1923, was a significant figure at the theatre during the Collins years and wrote books which record much more than its musical life.

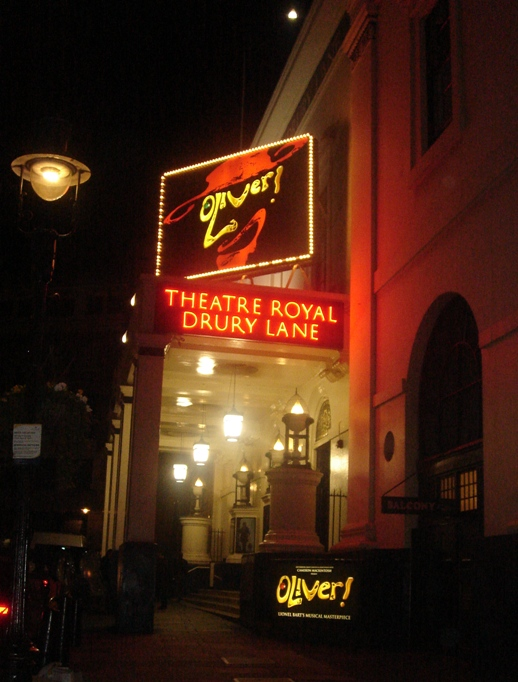
Oliver! billboard at the theatre in 2009

=== Interior renovation (1922) ===
In 1922, under the ownership of managing director Sir Alfred Butt, the theatre underwent its last major interior renovation of the 20th century. At a cost of £150,000 (equivalent to £7.37 million in 2025), it became a four-tiered theatre able to seat just over 2,000 people. It was decorated with one of the most notable interiors produced by the specialist ornamental plasterwork company of Clark and Fenn. Composer and performer Ivor Novello, immensely popular in his time though little-remembered today, presented his musicals in Drury Lane from 1931 to 1939.

The theatre was closed in 1939 because of the outbreak of the Second World War. During the war, it served as the headquarters for the Entertainments National Service Association, sustaining some minor bomb damage. It reopened in 1946 with Noël Coward's Pacific 1860.

The building was Grade I listed in February 1958.

In 2000, Theatre Royal Drury Lane was purchased by Andrew Lloyd Webber. Since 2014, it has been owned and managed by LW Theatres, Lloyd Webber's management company. The seating plan for the theatre remains the same and the auditorium is still one of the largest in London's West End. It is one of the 40 theatres featured in the 2012 DVD documentary series Great West End Theatres, presented by Donald Sinden.

=== 350th anniversary renovation (2013) ===
On 15 May 2013, Lloyd Webber revealed a £4 million restoration of the theatre to mark its 350th anniversary. Using a team of specialists, the detailed restoration has returned the public areas of the Rotunda, Royal Staircases and Grand Saloon, all of which were part of the 1810 theatre, to their original Regency style.

== Productions of the 20th and 21st centuries ==
Four of Rodgers and Hammerstein's musicals made their London debuts in Drury Lane, holding the stage almost continuously for nearly a decade, including Oklahoma! (1947–1950), Carousel (1950–1951), South Pacific (1951–1953) and The King and I (1953–1956). American imports also included Lerner and Loewe's My Fair Lady, which began a five-year run in 1958. In 1974, Monty Python recorded an album at the theatre, Live at Drury Lane.

Later long runs at the theatre include productions of A Chorus Line (1976–1979), 42nd Street (1984–1989), Miss Saigon (1989–1999, the theatre's longest-running show), The Producers (2004–2007), Charlie and the Chocolate Factory the Musical (2013–2017) and Frozen (2021–2024). Shakespeare revivals at the theatre directed by Jamie Lloyd have included The Tempest (2024–2025) and Much Ado About Nothing (2025).

The London Theatres website has a timeline that selects the following additional fully-staged productions since 1919:

- Cinderella (1919)
- Rose Marie (1924–1927)
- Showboat (1928–1929)
- Cavalcade (1931–1932)
- Three Sisters (1934)
- Camelot (1964–1965)
- Hello, Dolly! (1965–1967)
- Mame (1969–1970)
- The Great Waltz (1970–1972)
- Gone with the Wind (1972–1973)
- Billy (1974–1976)
- Sweeney Todd: The Demon Barber of Fleet Street (1980)
- The Best Little Whorehouse in Texas (1981–1983)
- The Witches of Eastwick (2000–2001)
- My Fair Lady (revival) (2001–2003)
- Anything Goes (revival) (2003–2004)
- The Lord of the Rings: The Musical (2007–2008)
- Oliver! (2009–2011)
- Shrek The Musical (2011–2013)
- 42nd Street (revival) (2017–2019)
- Hercules (2025–2026)
- Jesus Christ Superstar (2026–present)

== Hauntings ==
The author Tom Ogden calls the Theatre Royal one of the world's most haunted theatres. The appearance of almost any one of the handful of ghosts that are said to frequent the theatre signals good luck for an actor or production. The most famous ghost is the "Man in Grey", who appears dressed as a nobleman of the late 18th century: powdered hair beneath a tricorne hat, a dress jacket and cloak or cape, riding boots and a sword. Legend says that the Man in Grey is the ghost of a knife-stabbed man whose skeletal remains were found within a walled-up side passage in 1848. Various people have reported seeing the ghost, including W. J. MacQueen-Pope, who described its usual path as starting at the end of the fourth row in the upper circle and then proceeding via the rear gangway to the wall near the royal box, where the remains were found.

The ghosts of actor Charles Macklin and clown Joseph Grimaldi are also supposed to haunt the theatre. Macklin appears backstage, wandering the corridor which now stands in the spot where, in 1735, he killed fellow actor Thomas Hallam in an argument over a wig ("Goddamn you for a blackguard, scrub, rascal!" he shouted, thrusting a cane into Hallam's face and piercing his left eye). Grimaldi is reported to be a helpful apparition, purportedly guiding nervous actors skilfully about the stage on more than one occasion. The comedian Stanley Lupino said he had seen the ghost of Dan Leno in a dressing room.

== See also ==
- English drama
- European Route of Historic Theatres
- Rose Theatre

== Bibliography ==
- Auburn, Mark S. (1995). "Theatre in the age of Garrick and Sheridan". In Morwood, James; Crane, David (eds.). Sheridan Studies. Cambridge University Press. pp. 7–46. ISBN 978-0-521-46466-6.
- Beauclerk, Charles (2005). Nell Gwyn: Mistress to a King. Atlantic Monthly Press. ISBN 978-0-87113-926-9.
- Bradby, David; James, Louis; Sharratt, Bernard, eds. (1981). Performance and Politics in Popular Drama. Cambridge University Press. ISBN 978-0-521-28524-7.
- Dobbs, Brian (1972). Drury Lane: Three Centuries of the Theatre Royal, 1663–1971. Cassell.
- Earl, John; Sell, Michael (2000). Guide to British Theatres 1750–1950. Theatres Trust. pp. 107–8. ISBN 978-0-7136-5688-6.
- Faul, Michel (2006). Louis Jullien: musique, spectacle et folie au XIXe siècle (in French). Atlantica. ISBN 978-2-35165-038-7.
- Greenfield, Anne Leah, ed. (2015). Interpreting Sexual Violence, 1660–1800. Routledge. ISBN 978-1-317-31884-2.
- Hartnoll, Phyllis, ed. (1983). The Oxford Companion to the Theatre (4th ed.). London: Oxford University Press. pp. 230–232. ISBN 978-0-19-211546-1.
- Hischak, Thomas S. (2007). The Rodgers and Hammerstein Encyclopedia. Westport, Conn.: Greenwood Publishing Group. ISBN 978-0-313-34140-3.
- Hume, Robert D. (1976). The Development of English Drama in the Late Seventeenth Century (1990 ed.). Clarendon Press. ISBN 978-0-19-811799-5.
- Kliman, Bernice W. (2008). Tragedy of Hamlet of Denmark. Indiana: Focus Publishing. ISBN 978-1-58510-513-7.
- Leacroft, Richard (1973). The Development of the English Playhouse. Cornell University Press. ISBN 978-0-8014-0750-5.
- Mackintosh, Iain (1993). Architecture, Actor and Audience. Routledge UK. ISBN 978-0-415-03183-7.
- McConnell Stott, Andrew (2009). The Pantomime Life of Joseph Grimaldi. Edinburgh: Canongate Books. ISBN 978-1-84767-761-7.
- MacQueen-Pope, Walter (1945). Theatre Royal, Drury Lane. W. H. Allen & Co.
- Milhous, Judith (1979). Thomas Betterton and the Management of Lincoln's Inn Fields 1695–1708. Carbondale, Illinois: Southern Illinois University Press. ISBN 978-0-8093-0906-1.
- Nagler, Alois M. (1959). A Source Book in Theatrical History. Courier Dover. ISBN 978-0-486-20515-1.
- Smith, John Harrington (1948). The Gay Couple in Restoration Comedy. Cambridge: Harvard University Press.
- Spiers, Rupert (2002). "Restoration Theatre". Archived from the original on 1 September 2008.
- Stone, George Winchester; Kahrl, George M. (1979). David Garrick: A Critical Biography. Carbondale, Illinois: Southern Illinois University Press. ISBN 978-0-8093-0931-3.
- Thomson, Peter (1995). "Drury Lane, Theatre Royal". In Banham, Martin (ed.). The Cambridge Guide to Theatre. Cambridge University Press. pp. 309–311. ISBN 978-0-521-43437-9.
- Underwood, Peter (2013). "Theatre Royal, Drury Lane". Haunted London. Amberley. pp. 55–61. ISBN 978-1-4456-2859-2.
