= List of Latin abbreviations =

This is a list of common Latin abbreviations. Nearly all the abbreviations below have been adopted by Modern English. However, with some exceptions (for example, versus or modus operandi), most of the Latin referent words and phrases are perceived as foreign to English. In a few cases, English referents have replaced the original Latin ones (e.g., "rest in peace" for RIP and "postscript" for PS).

Latin was once the universal academic language in Europe. From the 18th century, authors started using their mother tongues to write books, papers or proceedings. Even when Latin fell out of use, many Latin abbreviations continued to be used due to their precise simplicity and Latin's status as a learned language.

== List of common abbreviations ==
Common Latin abbreviations
Abbreviation	Latin	Translation	Usage and notes
AD	anno Domini	"in the year of the Lord"	Used to label or number years in the Julian and Gregorian calendars. The AD or the Christian calendar era is based on the traditionally reckoned year of the conception or birth of Jesus of Nazareth, with AD counting years after the start of this epoch, and BC counting years before the start of the epoch. Example: "The United States Civil War began in AD 1861."
a.i.	ad interim	"temporarily"	Used in business organizational charts
a.m.	ante meridiem	"before midday"	Used on the twelve-hour clock to indicate times during the morning. Example: "We will meet the mayor at 10:00 a.m." (10:00 in 24-hour clock)
ca. c.	circa	"around", "about", "approximately"	Used with dates to indicate "approximately". Example: "The antique clock is from ca. 1900."
Cap.	capitulus	"chapter"	Used before a chapter number of laws of the United Kingdom and its former colonies. Example: "Electronic Transactions Ordinance (Cap. 553)."
cf.	confer	"bring together" and hence "compare"	Confer is an imperative form of the Latin verb conferre. Used interchangeably with "cp." in citations indicating the reader should compare a statement with that from the cited source. It is also widely used as an abbreviation for "see", although some styles recommend against such use. Example: "These results were similar to those obtained using different techniques (cf. Wilson, 1999 and Ansmann, 1992)."
CP	ceteris paribus	"other things being equal"	Commonly used in economics, ceteris paribus allows for supply and demand models to reflect specific variables. If one assumes that the only thing changing is, say, the price of wheat, then demand and supply will both be affected appropriately. While this is simplification of actual dynamic market models, it makes learning economic theory easier.
CV	curriculum vitae	"course of life"	A document containing a summary or listing of relevant job experience and education. The exact usage of the term varies between British English and American English. The singular form is never vita. Curriculum is already singular, vitae is genitive from vita, i.e., "of life", despite the plural-appearing vitae modifier. The true plural is curricula vitae.
cwt.	centum weight	"hundredweight"	This is a mixture of Latin and English abbreviations.
DG	Dei gratia	"by the grace of God"	A part of the monarch's title, it is found on all British and Canadian coins.
DV	Deo volente	"God willing"	
ead.	eadem	"the same" (woman)	See id. below. Eadem is pronounced with stress on the first e.
et al.	et alii, et alia, et alibi	"and others", "and co-workers", "and other things", "and other places"	Example: "These results agree with the ones published by Pelon et al. (2002)."; Et al. should be preferred over etc. to refer to people.
etc.	et cetera	"and the others", "and other things", "and the rest"	Other archaic abbreviations include "&c.", "&/c.", "&e.", "&ct.", and "&ca." Example: "I need to go to the store and buy some pie, milk, cheese, etc." Because cetera implies inanimate objects, et al. is preferred when speaking of people.
e.g.	exempli gratia	"for example", "for instance", "example given" (mnemonic)	Introduces an example (as opposed to an explanation): "The shipping company instituted a surcharge on any items weighing over a ton; e.g., a car or truck."
fac.	ex post facto	"after the fact", "retroactive"	Used similarly to "retroactive". Example: "The sentiment that ex post facto laws are against natural right is so strong in the United States, that few, if any, of the State constitutions have failed to proscribe them." —Thomas Jefferson, Letter to Isaac McPherson, August 13, 1813
fl.	floruit	"flourished"	Followed by the dates during which the person, usually famous, was active and productive in his/her profession. Typically used when the person's dates of birth and death are unknown.
f. (singular) ff. (plural)	folio, foliis	"and following"	This abbreviation is used in citations to indicate an unspecified number of pages following the specified page. Example: "see page 258ff."
ibid.	ibidem	"in the same place" (book, etc.)"	The abbreviation is used in citations. Not to be confused with id.
id.	idem	"the same" (man)	It is used to avoid repeating the name of a male author (in citations, footnotes, bibliographies, etc.) When quoting a female author, use the corresponding feminine form, ead. (eadem), "the same" (woman).
i.a.	inter alia	"among other things"	Example: "Ernest Hemingway—author (i.a. 'The Sun Also Rises') and friend."
i.e.	id est	"that is", "in other words", "is equivalent" (mnemonic)	Introduces an explanation (as opposed to an example): "For reasons not fully understood there is only a minor PSI contribution to the variable fluorescence emission of chloroplasts (Dau, 1994), i.e., the PSI fluorescence appears to be independent from the state of its reaction centre (Butler, 1978)."; See also the note for sc.
lb. (singular) lbs. (also plural)	libra	"scales"	Used to indicate the pound (unit of mass).
loc. cit.	loco citato	"(in) the place cited"	Means in the same place (i.e., page or section) in an article, book or other reference work as was mentioned before. It differs from "op. cit." in that the latter may refer to a different page or section in the previously cited work.
MO	modus operandi	"method of operating"	Can refer to one's body of business practices. Also, in criminology, to refer to a criminal's method of operation.
NB	nota bene (singular), notate bene (plural)	"note well"	Some people use "Note" for the same purpose. Usually written with majuscule (upper case, or capital) letters. Example: "NB: All the measurements have an accuracy of within 5% as they were calibrated according to the procedure described by Jackson (1989)."
nem. con.	nemine contradicente	"with no one speaking against"	The meaning is distinct from "unanimously"; "nem. con." simply means that nobody voted against. Thus there may have been abstentions from the vote.
no.	numero (singular), nos. (plural)	"number"	Used as a common abbreviation for "number" in all forms of writing.
op. cit.	opere citato	"(in) the work cited"	Means in the same article, book or other reference work as was mentioned before. It is most often used in citations in a similar way to "ibid", though "ibid" would usually be followed by a page number.
OV	orthographiae variae	"various spellings"	Used in historical research where spellings of names varied, such as genealogy tables and ancestry charts, for example when MacDonald, Macdonald, and McDonald are used by different members of the same family, or even by the same person at different times (before spellings were standardized). See also Orthographical variant.
p.a.	per annum	"through a year"	Used in the sense of "yearly".
per cent.	per centum	"for each one hundred"	Commonly "percent" in American English.
p.m.	post meridiem	"after midday"	Used on the twelve-hour clock to indicate times after 12 midday. Example: "We will meet the mayor at 2:00 p.m." (14:00 in 24-hour clock)
p.m.a.	post mortem auctoris	"after the author's death"	
p.p. per pro.	per procurationem	"through the agency of"	
PRN	pro re nata	"for the thing born"	As used in standard medical jargon, PRN is understood to mean "as needed". This reading of the abbreviation implies that the delivery of the prescription (by a suitable person, following a medications protocol) is done in a reactive, passive way, e.g., "when that happens, do this". A more literal translation of the Latin is "before a thing is born", which is an instruction to act pro-actively, e.g., "before that happens, do this". A PRN medication delivery is therefore properly done when a physician judges that it should be done, in order to prevent a specified problem from occurring. Oversimplifying, a patient's breakfast could be written as a PRN prescription: give this breakfast to that patient, to prevent that patient from experiencing hunger.
pro tem.	pro tempore	"for the time being", "temporarily", "in place of"	
PS	post scriptum	"after what has been written", "postscript"	Used to indicate additions to a text after the signature of a letter. Example (in a letter format): "Sincerely, John Smith. PS Tell mother I say hello!"
PPS	post post scriptum	"post-postscript"	Used to indicate additions after a postscript. Sometimes extended to comical length with PPPS, PPPPS, and so on.
q.d.	quaque die	"every day"	Used on prescriptions to indicate the medicine should be taken daily.
QED	quod erat demonstrandum	"that which was to be demonstrated"	Cited in many texts at the end of a mathematical proof. Example: "At the end of the long proof, the professor exclaimed 'QED!'"
q.v. qq.v.	quod vide quae vide	"which see"	Imperative, used after a term or phrase that should be looked up elsewhere in the current document or book. For more than one term or phrase, the plural qq.v. is used.
re	in re	"in the matter of", "concerning"	Often used to prefix the subject of traditional letters and memoranda. However, when used in an e-mail subject, there is evidence that it functions as an abbreviation of "reply" rather than the word meaning "in the matter of". Nominative case singular 'res' is the Latin equivalent of 'thing'; singular 're' is the ablative case required by 'in'. Some people believe that it is short for 'regarding', especially if it is followed by a colon (i.e., "Re:").
Reg.	regina	"queen"	A part of the monarch's title. It is found on all British coins minted during the reign of a monarch who is a queen. Rex, "king" (not an abbreviation) is used when the reigning monarch is a king.
r.	regnavit, or, more rarely, rexit	"he/she reigned", "he/she ruled"	Often abbreviated as "r." followed by the dates during which the king or queen reigned/ruled, as opposed to the monarch's dates of birth and death. Often used parenthetically after the monarch's name.
RIP	requiescat in pace, requiescant in pace	"may he/she rest in peace", "may they rest in peace"	Used as a short prayer for a dead person, frequently found on tombstones. This prayer's English equivalent would be rest in peace. Example: "RIP, good grandmother."
s.a.	sensu amplo	"in a relaxed, generous (or 'ample') sense"	
s.a.	sine anno	"without year of publication"	Commonly used in bibliography.
sc. scil.	scilicet	"it is permitted to know", "one may know", "to wit"	Sc. provides a parenthetic clarification, removes an ambiguity, or supplies a word omitted in preceding text, while viz. is usually used to elaborate or detail text which precedes it. Sc. and viz. are not to be confused with i.e. (id est), equivalent to "that is". Their meanings are similar, but there is a distinction which should be observed: sc. and viz. introduce a clarification, while i.e. introduces an equivalence.
s.d.	sine data	"without date of publication"	Commonly used in bibliography.
s.l.	sensu lato	"in the wide or broad sense"	Example: "New Age s.l. has a strong American flavor influenced by Californian counterculture."
s.l.	sine loco	"without place of publication"	Commonly used in bibliography.
s.s.	sensu stricto	"in the strict sense"	Example: "New Age s.s. refers to a spectrum of alternative communities in Europe and the United States in the 1970s."
SOS	si opus sit	"if there is need", "if occasion require", "if necessary"	A prescription indication that the drug is to be administered only once.
sic	sic	"thus"	Used when quoting text that contains some form of mistake, to show that the mistake was in the original work and is not a misquotation. Sic is also often used to indicate surprise or incredulity, or maliciously, to draw attention to an author's mistake.
stat.	statim	"immediately"	Often used in medical contexts. Example: "That patient needs attention, stat.!"
viz.	videlicet	"namely", "to wit", "precisely", "that is to say"	In contradistinction to "i.e." and "e.g.", "viz." is used to indicate a detailed description of something stated before, and when it precedes a list of group members, it implies (near) completeness. Example: "The noble gases, viz. helium, neon, argon, xenon, krypton and radon, show a non-expected behaviour when exposed to this new element." See also sc.
vs. v.	versus	"against"	Sometimes is not abbreviated. Example: "The next football game will be the Knights vs. the Sea Eagles."; English law uses v without a full stop (period), never vs, and is read as against (in criminal cases) or and (in civil cases); for example, "R[egina] v Gadd" (a criminal case) is read as "The Crown against Gadd." In Scots Law, the v is read "against"; for example, "Donoghue v Stevenson" is pronounced "Donoghue against Stevenson." US law usually uses v. with a full stop (period), and is typically read as "v" or "versus".

== List of less-common abbreviations and usages ==
Words and abbreviations that have been in general use but are currently used less often.

Lesser-common Latin abbreviations and usages
abbreviation or word	Latin	translation	usage and notes
a.C.n.	ante Christum natum	"before Christ"	"B.C." is commonly used in English instead to convey this meaning.
ad. nat. delt.	ad naturam delineavit	"after nature"	Example: "She drew this artwork ad. nat. delt."
AMDG	ad maiorem Dei gloriam, ad majorem Dei gloriam	"for the greater glory of God"	The motto of the Society of Jesus.
An. Sal. AS	Anno Salutis	"the year of salvation"	The year of Christ the Savior, similar to AD.
ap.	Apud	"in the writings of" or "quoted by [or] according to" (for quotations of a quotation)	Used to cite to a source through, via, or as described in a second source
a.u.	anno urbis	"the year of the city"	See AUC
AUC	ab Urbe condita, anno Urbis conditae	"from the foundation of the City"	Refers to the founding of Rome, which occurred in 753 BC according to the Varronian chronology. Used as a reference point in ancient Rome for establishing dates, before being supplanted by other systems. Also anno Urbis conditae (AUC) ("in the year that the City [Rome] was founded"). For example, the year 2007 AD is the year 2761 ab Urbe condita (753 + 1 + 2007 = 2761); though, rigorously speaking, the year AUC begins on April 21, the birthday of Rome (i.e., the day that Romulus was traditionally believed to have founded the Eternal City). (The reason for adding 1 to 753 is that the Romans counted dates "inclusively," i.e., including both the first and the last day or year in the count.)
Ben	Benedictus	"Blessed"	
c̅	cum	"with"	Usually found in medical shorthand.
CC.	Civis in plural	"citizens"	Abbreviation for Citizens (plural of citizen). Usually found in legal documents in Civil law countries.
DSP	decessit sine prole	"died without issue"	Used in genealogy.
et seq. et seqq. et sequa.	et sequens	"and the words, pages, etc. that follow"	Used when referring the reader to a passage beginning in a certain place, and continuing, e.g., "p.6 et seqq." means "page 6 and the pages that follow". Use et seqq. or et sequa. if "the following" is plural.
et ux.	et uxor	"and wife"	
et vir		"and husband"	
dwt.	denarius weight	"pennyweight"	This is a mixture of Latin and English abbreviations.
FD; Fid. Def.	fidei defensor	"defender of the faith"	A part of the monarch's title, it is found on all British coins.
INDFSSA	In Nomine Dei/Domini Filii Spiritus Sancti Amen	"In the name of the Lord, the Son, and the Holy Spirit, Amen"	
in litt.	in litteris	"in a letter" or other documented correspondence	Often followed by a date.
INRI	Iesus Nazarenus, Rex Iudaeorum	"Jesus the Nazarene, King of the Jews"	
inst.	instante mense	"this month"	See also prox. and ult.
inter alios		"among others"	Among other people, or among other legal entities.
loq.	loquitur	"he speaks" or "she speaks"	
m.m.	mutatis mutandis	"having changed what needs to be changed", "once the necessary changes have been made"	Used in many countries to acknowledge that a comparison being made requires certain obvious alterations, which are left unstated. It is not to be confused with the similar ceteris paribus, which excludes any changes other than those explicitly mentioned.
NIA	In Nomine Iesus Amen	"In the name of Jesus Amen"	
N.N.	nomen nescio	"I do not know the name"	Used as a placeholder for unknown names in, i.a., the Book of Common Prayer.
Nob.	nobis	"by us"	Used in Latin descriptions of organisms, particularly plants, to indicate that a name is due to the author or authors.
OD	oculus dexter	"the right eye"	Used in vision correction prescriptions.
OHSS	Ossa hic sita sunt	"here lie the bones"	Used on sepulchers and gravestones.
OS	oculus sinister	"the left eye"	Used in vision correction prescriptions.
OU	oculus uterque	"both eyes"	Used in vision correction prescriptions.
per mil.	per mille	"in each thousand"	
prox.	proximo mense	"next month"	See also inst. and ult.
QDBV	quod deus bene vertat	"may God look favourably on this"	Often on the title page of books.
QEC	quod erat construendum	"which was to be constructed"	After constructing something, normally to show its existence.
QEF	quod erat faciendum	"which was to be done"	
QEI	quod erat inveniendum	"which was to be found out"	Usually at the end of mathematical proofs.
s̅	sine	"without"	Usually found in medical shorthand.
S	Sanctus/Salvator	"Holy/Saviour"	
sec.	secundum	"second", "after", "following"	Used in several related senses such as "in the sense of" or "in accordance with". For example, in taxonomy "...sec. Smith..." typically would mean something like: "...in accordance with the ideas of Smith in this matter..."
SCS	Sanctus	"Holy"	
SCSDX	Sanctus Dominus Christus	"Holy Lord Christ"	
SDX	Sanctus Dominus Christus	"Holy Lord Christ"	
SDIX	Salvator Dominus Iesus Christus	"Saviour Lord Jesus Christ"	
sphalm.	sphalma typographicum	"misprint"	
SPD	salutem plurimam dicit	"sends many greetings"	Example: Areia S.P.D. Apollonio. ("Areia sends many greetings to Apollonius.")
SPQR	Senatus Populusque Romanus	"Senate and People of Rome"	
sqq.	sequentia	"the following ones"	Same as ff., used for an unspecified number of pages following the one cited.
stet		"let it stand"	Used in editing to indicate that something should remain as it is, and not be changed.
STTL	sit tibi terra levis	"may the earth rest lightly on you"	Was used in similar manner to R.I.P.
s.v.	sub verbo	"under the word or heading"	As in a dictionary.
SVBEEV	si vales bene est ego valeo	"If you are well, it is good. I am well."	Among the Romans, this was a traditional salutation at the beginning of a letter.
ult.	ultimo mense	"last month"	See also inst. and prox.
u.s.	ut supra	"as above"	
VC	vi coactus	"constrained by force"	Used when forced to sign.
VI	Venerate Iesum	"Venerate Jesus"	
v.i.	vide infra	"see below"	
v.s.	vide supra	"see above"	
X	Christus	"Christ"	

== Academic degrees ==
Academic degrees using Latin abbreviations
Abbreviation	Latin	Translation	Usage and notes
AB; BA	Artium Baccalaureus	"Bachelor of Arts"	An undergraduate bachelor's degree awarded for either a course or a program in the liberal arts or the sciences, or both.
BSc	Scientiae Baccalaureus	"Bachelor of Science"	An undergraduate bachelor's degree that is awarded for academic programs adjacent to mathematics, natural sciences or engineering. It generally lasts three to five years. Where periods are used, it is "B.Sc."
DD	Divinitatis Doctor	"Doctor of Divinity"	
DLit; DLitt	Doctor Litterarum	"Doctor of Literature" or "Doctor of Letters"	Where periods are used, it is "D.Lit." or "D.Litt."
DM	Doctor Medicinae	"Doctor of Medicine"	
DMD	Dentae Medicinae Doctor	"Doctor of Dental Medicine"	
DPhil	Doctor Philosophiæ	"Doctor of Philosophy"	Where periods are used, it is "D.Phil."
DSc	Doctor Scientiae	"Doctor of Science"	Where periods are used, it is "D.Sc."
DTh	Doctor Theologiae	"Doctor of Theology"	Where periods are used, it is "D.Th."
EdD	Educationae Doctor	"Doctor of Education"	Where periods are used, it is "Ed.D."
JD	Juris Doctor	"Doctor of Jurisprudence" or "Doctor of Law"	
JSD	Juridicae Scientiae Doctor	"Doctor of Juridical Science"	
LitD; LittD	Litterarum Doctor	"Doctor of Literature" or "Doctor of Letters"	Where periods are used, it is "Lit.D." or "Litt.D."
LLB	Legum Baccalaureus	"Bachelor of Laws"	The "LL" of the abbreviation for the degree is from the genitive plural legum (singular: lex or legis, for law), thus "LLB" stands for Legum Baccalaureus in Latin. Where periods are used, it is "LL.B." In the United States it was sometimes erroneously called "Bachelor of Legal Letters" to account for the double "L" (and therefore sometimes wrongly abbreviated as "L.L.B.").
LLD	Legum Doctor	"Doctor of Laws"	Where periods are used, it is "LL.D."
LLM	Legum Magister	"Master of Laws"	Where periods are used, it is "LL.M."
MA	Magister Artium	"Master of Arts"	A postgraduate academic master degree awarded by universities in many countries. The degree is typically studied for in fine art, humanities, social science or theology and can be either fully taught, research-based, or a combination of the two.
MD	Medicinae Doctor	"Doctor of Medicine"	
MSc	Magister Scientiae	"Master of Science"	In contrast to the Master of Arts degree, it is typically granted for studies in sciences, engineering and medicine and is usually for programs that are more focused on scientific and mathematical subjects. However, different universities have different conventions and may also offer the degree for fields typically considered within the humanities and social sciences. Where periods are used, it is "M.Sc."
OD	Optometriae Doctor	"Doctor of Optometry"	
PhD	Philosophiae Doctor	"Doctor of Philosophy"	Where periods are used, it is "Ph.D."
SJD	Scientiae Juridicae Doctor	"Doctor of Juridical Science"	
ScD	Scientiae Doctor	"Doctor of Science"	Where periods are used, it is "Sc.D."
S.S. Theol.	Sacrosanctae Theologiae	"of the holy theology"	Used in abbreviations in "S.S.Theol.Doct." (Doctor of Theology) and in "S.S.Theol.Studiosus" ("student of theology").
ThD	Theologiae Doctor	"Doctor of Theology"	Where periods are used, it is "Th.D."
VMD	Veterinariae Medicinae Doctor	"Doctor of Veterinary Medicine"	

== Used in biology ==
- aff. (affinis): having affinity with, similar but not identical to
- auct. (auctorum): of the authors; indicates that a name is used in the sense of subsequent authors, and not in the sense of the original author
- Ca. (Candidatus): for candidate names of organisms that have not been completely accepted
- comb. nov. (Combinatio nova): a new combination of generic and epithet name
- ex. (exemplar): example or specimen; plural abbreviated as exx.
- exs. (exsiccatus): dried
- f. sp. (forma specialis): a special form adapted to a specific host; plural abbreviated as ff. spp.
- hb. (herbarium): herbarium
- herb. (herbarium): herbarium
- in coll. (in collectionem): in the collection, often followed by the name of a collection or museum
- ined. (ineditus): an unpublished scientific name
- indet. (indeterminans): undetermined, unidentified
- in sched. (in schedula): on a herbarium sheet or label
- in syn. (in synonymia): in synonymy
- leg. (legit): he/she/they collected, often followed by the name of the collector
- nob. (nobis): by us, used to indicate that the writer(s) are the author(s) of a scientific name
- nom. (nomen): name
- nom. nov. (nomen nova): a new replacement name for a taxon
- n.v. (non visus): not seen
- n.v. (non vidi): I have not seen
- sensu: "in the sense of", used for different groups of organisms
- sp. (species): species (singular); plural also species, abbreviated as spp.
- sp. nov. (species nova): new species (singular); plural is species novae, abbreviated as spp. nov.
- ssp., subsp. (subspecies): subspecies (singular); plural is subspecies, abbreviated sspp. or subspp.
- typ. (typus): type

== See also ==
- Glossary of scientific naming § Latin abbreviations
- List of abbreviations used in medical prescriptions
- List of classical abbreviations
- List of ecclesiastical abbreviations
- List of Latin phrases
- Scribal abbreviation
