= Poenit =

Poenit may refer to:

- Poenit., an ecclesiastical abbreviation for Poenitentia ('Penance')
- Poenit., a classical abbreviation for Poenitentia ('Penance')

== See also ==
- Apostolic Penitentiary (Poenit. Ap.: Pœnitentiaria Apostolica)
- Land of Punt (Egyptian: pwnt; alternate Egyptological reading Pwene(t))
