= List of Yiddish abbreviations =

This is a list of Yiddish Abbreviations.

== Sorting Order ==
The entries are sorted according to the Hebrew alphabet. Prefixes indicating prepositions and articles (such as ב, ד, ה, ש, כ) have generally been removed, with the following exceptions:

- Where the abbreviation is incomprehensible or meaningless without the prefix
- Where the prefix is so integral to the acronym that variants without it rarely, if ever, occur

For ease of searching and sorting, double letters (ײ and װ) have been treated as if they were two separate letters.

== Numeronyms and other abbreviations with numerical elements ==
Some abbreviations included here are actually gematria (Hebrew numeronyms), but the number is so closely associated with some noun that it is grammatically used as a noun and is synonymous with it, for example ל"ו, lamed vov.

Other abbreviations contain a variable gematria component alongside other words, like the chapter references פי"א perek yud-alef (chapter 11) or פ"ט perek tet (chapter 9). Rather than list separate entries for every possible gematria, or use only one example number, the gematria component is replaced with [x] to produce (for example) [x]"פ.

== Abbreviations from other Hebraic languages ==
Some Hebrew and Aramaic abbreviations may not be included here; more may be found in the List of Hebrew abbreviations and the List of Aramaic abbreviations, respectively.

Many of the abbreviations here may be similar or identical to those in the other lists of acronyms. In fact, a work written in Yiddish may have Hebrew and Aramaic abbreviations interspersed throughout, much as an Aramaic work may borrow from Hebrew (ex. Talmud, Midrash, Zohar) and Hebrew from Aramaic (ex. Shulchan Aruch, Mishneh Torah). Although somewhat less common than Hebrew abbreviations, some Yiddish material contains Aramaic abbreviations too (for example, Chassidic responsa, commentaries, and other material).

== Stylistic Guide and Orthography ==
There are many different ways that abbreviations, acronyms, and letter words can be notated in Yiddish. Below are some general principles that can guide one in how to denote different types of abbreviations using punctuation.

- For weights, measures, and units of currency, no punctuation is required. These should only be used following a number, not when following a word.
- For first or last names, use a period (e.g., "י. ל. פּרץ" for "יצחק־לייבוש פּרץ")
- For titles and bibliographical items, use a single apostrophe following the first letter
  - To create a plural of the above, use a single apostrophe following the first letter doubled
- When truncating a word to its first syllable, use a single apostrophe following that syllable
- If using two or more words, use a double apostrophe before the initial letter of the last word
- If an abbreviation has become a word in its own right, (i.e., become an acronym), the apostrophe can be omitted entirely (e.g., "ייִװאָ" for "ייִדישער װיסנשאַפֿטלעכער אינסטיטוט")
- International letter words are transliterated and hyphenated together (e.g., "עף-בי-אײַ" for FBI)

There are additionally other abbreviations that utilize single or double apostrophes in various combinations.

== List ==
=== א ===
- און אַנדערע, א"א (un andere) – and others, et al; etc.
  - Variant: א"אַנד
- .און א‌ַלזא װײַטער, א.א.װ (un alzo veiter) - and so on
- .און אזוי װײַטער, א.א.װ (un azoy veiter) - and so on
- אויפֿן אַדרעס פֿון, א"אַפֿ (oyfn adres fun) – c/o, in care of
- אם-ירצה-הסם, אי"ה (im-yirts(e)-hashem/mirt(se)shem) – God willing

=== ב ===
- באַנד, ב׳ (band) – volume (of a book)
  - בענד/בענדער, בב׳ (bend(er)) – volumes (of a book)
- בסך-הכּל, בס"ה (bes(e)khakl) – all told, in all

=== ג ===
- גראַם, ג (gram) – gram

=== ד ===
- דאָלאַר, ד (dolar) – dollar(s)
- דאָס הייסט, ד״ה (dos heyst) – that is, i.e.
- דאָס ציטירטע װערק, דצ"װ (dos tsitirte verk) – the cited work, op. cit.
- דאָקטאָר/דאָקטער, ד"ר (doktor) – doctor

=== ה ===
- השם, ה׳ (HaShem) – "the ineffable Name (of God)", the Eternal One
- הער, ה׳ (her) – Mr.
  - הערן, הה׳ (hern) – Messrs.
- העפֿט, ה׳ (heft) – fascicle, issue (periodical)
- השם-יתברך, הש"י (HaShem-yisborekh) – "the Name, blessed be He", the Lord, God

=== ז ===
- זײַט(ל), ז׳ (zayt(l)) – page
  - זײַטלעך, זז׳ (zaytlekh) – pages
- ז"ל – used for several grammatical variants of an honorific for the dead
  - זכונה לבֿרכה (zikhroyne livrokhe) – "may her memory be a blessing"
  - זיכרונו לבֿרכה (zikhroyne livrokhe) – "may his memory be a blessing"
  - זיכרונם לבֿרכה (zikhroynom livrokhe) – "may their memory be a blessing"

=== ח ===
- חבֿר, ח׳ (chaver) – friend, colleague
  - חבֿרים, חח׳ (chaveyrim) – friends, colleagues
  - חבֿרטע, ח'טע (chaverte) – (in certain social/political circles) Miss, Mrs.; Comrade (fem.)
- חס-ושלום, ח"ו (khas-vesholem) – not at all!; by no means!; God forbid!
- חס-וחלילה, ח"ו (khas-vekholile) – under no circumstances; Heaven help us!
- [x]"ח ,[x] חלק (cheilek [x]) - (Hebrew) part [x]

=== י ===
- יארצייט, יא"צ (yartzeit) - anniversary of someone's passing, lit. time of year
- יאָרהונדערט, י"ה (yorhundert) – century

=== ל ===
- למד-װאָװניק, ל"וניק (lomedvovnik) – one of the 36 (gematria of ל"ו) Righteous Men
- לפּרט-גדול, לפּ"ג (liprat-godl) – (the Jewish year) expressed with the thousands
- לפּרט-קטן, לפּ"ק (liprat-kotn) – (the Jewish year) expressed without the thousands

=== כּ ===
- כּתבֿ-יד, כּ"י (ksavyad) - manuscript
- כּמה ערטער, כּ"ע (kame erter) - passim

=== מ ===
- [x] 'מ, [x] משנה (mishnah [x]) - (Hebrew) teaching [x]

=== נ ===
- ניו-יאָרק, נ"י (nyu-york) – New York
- נרו יאיר, נ"י (neyre yoer) – "may his light shine", wish for long life added after mentioning someone in a letter
- נאָך מיטאָג, נ"מ (noch mitog) – in the afternoon
- נאָך קריסטוסן, נ"ק (noch kristusn) – AD, CE

=== ס ===
- [x]"ס ,[x] סמן (siman [x]) - (Hebrew) chapter/section [x]
- [x]"ספ ,[x] סוף פרק (sof perek [x]) - (Hebrew) the end of chapter [x]
- סיאָניסטי סאָציאַליסטי, ס"ס (sionisti sotsialisti) – Zionist Socialist Workers Party. While the initials of this political party are often written as S.S. in Latin letters, this is not to be confused with the German SS, which is an international letter word and written "עס-עס".

=== פּ ===
- [x] 'פּ ,[x] פּרק (perek [x]) - (Hebrew) chapter [x]. But, see פּ"ק
- פּרק קמא, פּ"ק (perek kama) - (Aramaic) the first chapter. See also [x] 'פּ
- 'פּראַפֿעסאָר, פּראַפֿ (profesor) – professor

=== פֿ ===
- פֿאַר מיטאָג, פֿ"מ (far mitog) – in the morning
- פֿאַר קריסטוסן, פֿ"ק (far kristusn) – BC, BCE

=== צ ===
- צענטראל קאמיטעט, צ.ק. (tsentral komitet) – Central Committee

=== ק ===
- .ּקאַפּיטל/קאַפּיטלעך, קאַפּ'/קאַפ (kapitel/kapitlech) - chapter(s), esp. of the Book of Psalms
