= Idem =

Latin footnote or endnote term referring to the previous source or author

idem is a Latin term meaning "the same". It is commonly abbreviated as id., which is particularly used in legal citations to denote the previously cited source (compare ibid.). It is also used in academic citations to replace the name of a repeated author.

Id. is employed extensively in Canadian legislation and in legal documents of the United States to apply a short description to a section with the same focus as the previous.

Id. is masculine and neuter; ead. (feminine) is the abbreviation for eadem, which also translates to "the same".

As an abbreviation, Id. always takes a period (or full stop) in both British and American usage (see usage of the full stop in abbreviations). Its first known use dates back to the 14th century.

== Use ==
=== Legal ===
- United States v. Martinez-Fuerte, 428 U.S. 543, 545 (1976).
- Id. at 547.

Here, the first citation refers to the case of United States v. Martinez-Fuerte. The volume number cited is 428 and the page on which the case begins is 543, and the page number cited to is 545. The "U.S." between the numerical portions of the citation refers to the United States Reports. 1976 refers to the year that the case was published. The second citation references the first citation and automatically incorporates the same reporter and volume number; however, the page number cited is now 547. Id. refers to the immediately preceding citation, so if the previous citation includes more than one reference, or it is unclear which reference Id. refers to, its usage is inappropriate.

=== Academic ===
- Macgillivray, J. A. Minotaur: Sir Arthur Evans and the Archaeology of the Minoan Myth. New York: Hill & Wang, 2000.
- Id. Astral Labyrinth: Archaeology of the Greek Sky. Sutton Pub, 2003.

In this example, Id in the second citation indicates that the author is identical to that of the previous citation. That is, the author of the second citation is also Macgillivray, J. A.

=== Nautical ===
Idem is the name of a class of sailboats designed in 1897 by naval architect Clinton Crane. They are gaff-head sloops 32' long (19' at the waterline) and 8' wide. Eleven of the twelve original boats are still sailed on Upper Saint Regis Lake, NY. A new Idem was built on Upper Saint Regis Lake in 1999 by Nelson Crawford, adhering scrupulously to the original Crane design, including commissioning a run of Egyptian cotton sailcloth so that the sails would meet the original specifications.

== See also ==
- Bibliography
- Ditto mark
- Ibid. (ibidem)
- List of Latin abbreviations
- List of Latin phrases
- List of legal Latin terms
- Supra
