= Ibid. =

Latin footnote or endnote term referring to the previous source

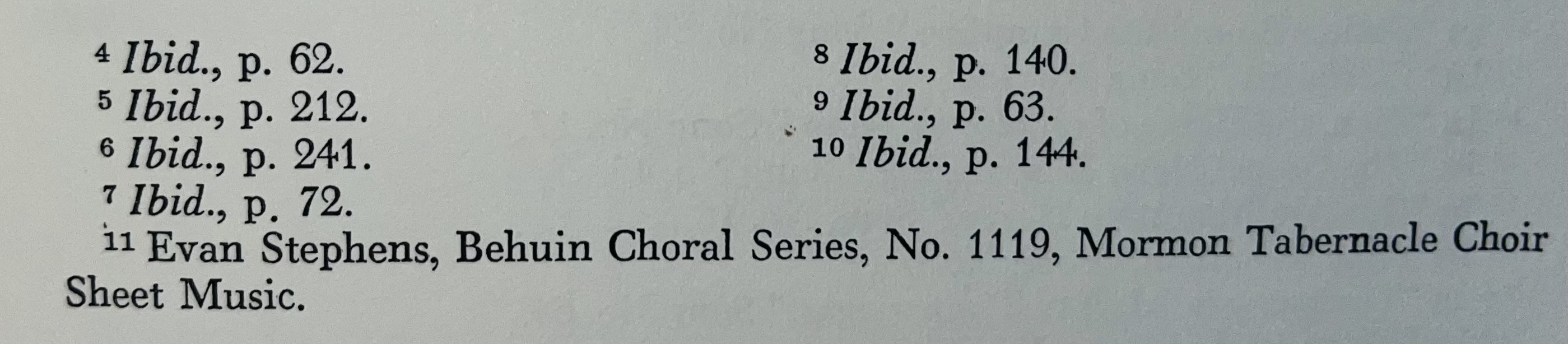
A list of citations, the majority Ibid citations

Ibid. or ib. is an abbreviation for the Latin word ibīdem, meaning 'in the same place', commonly used in an endnote, footnote, bibliography citation, or scholarly reference to refer to the source cited in the preceding note or list item. This is similar to idem, literally meaning 'the same', abbreviated id., which is commonly used in legal citation.

Ibid. may also be used in the Chicago (name-date) system for in-text references where there has been a close previous citation from the same source material. The previous reference should be immediately visible, e.g. within the same paragraph or page.

Some academic publishers now prefer that ibid. not be italicised, as it is a commonly found term. Usage differs from style or citation guides as to whether ibid should be suffixed with a full stop. For example, Oxford Standard for Citation of Legal Authorities omits full stops and does not capitalize, while The Economist's style guide uses a lower case starting letter with ending full stop. New Hart's Rules: The Oxford Style Guide recommends unitalicised and with a full stop: "ibid.".

== Example ==
[1] E. Vijh, Latin for Dummies (New York: Academic, 1997), 23.
[2] Ibid.
[3] Ibid., 29.
[4] A. Alhazred, The Necronomicon (Petrus de Dacia, 1994).
[5] Ibid. 1, 34.

Reference 2 is the same as reference 1: E. Vijh, Latin for Dummies on page 23, whereas reference 3 refers to the same work but at a different location, namely page 29. Intervening entries require a reference to the original citation in the form Ibid. <citation #>, as in reference 5.

== Cultural references ==
- "Ibid", a humorous short story by H. P. Lovecraft, purports to be a brief biography of the (fictional) Roman scholar Ibidus.
- Ibid. is used in the 1960s play Who's Afraid of Virginia Woolf? by Edward Albee. Albee uses an unabbreviated ibid (i.e. ibīdem) in his stage directions to tell an actor to use the same tone as the previous line.
- In the Discworld novels Pyramids and Small Gods by Terry Pratchett, an Ephebian philosopher is called Ibid, mentioned in the latter as the author of Discourses.

== See also ==
- Ditto mark
- Em dash
- Loc. cit.
- Op. cit.
- Supra (grammar)
- List of Latin abbreviations
