= List of ecclesiastical abbreviations =

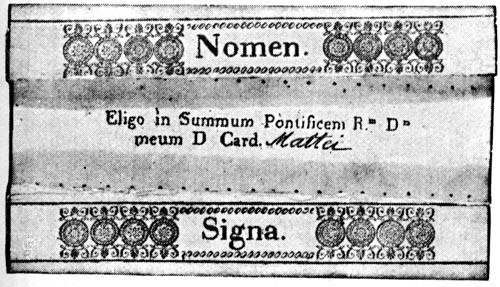
Ballot paper used for conclaves, with many Latin abbreviations.

In the Roman Catholic Church, the ecclesiastical words most commonly abbreviated at all times are proper names, titles (official or customary), of persons or corporations, and words of frequent occurrence.

== History ==
Between the seventh and ninth centuries, the ancient Roman system of abbreviations used in the Catholic Church gave way to a more difficult one that gradually grew up in the monastic houses and in the chanceries of the new Teutonic kingdoms.

Merovingian, Lombard, and Anglo-Saxon scripts each offer their own abbreviations, as well as the unique scotica manus or libri scottice scripti ('Irish hand', or books written in the medieval Irish hand). Eventually, the main productive centres of technical manuscripts, such as the Papal Chancery, the theological schools of Paris and Oxford, and the civil-law school of Bologna, set the standards of abbreviations for all Europe.

== Manuscripts ==
Medieval manuscripts make frequent use of abbreviations, owing in part to the abandonment of uncial and quasi-uncial script, and the almost universal use of cursive writing.

Medieval authors inherited a few abbreviations from Christian antiquity; others were invented or adapted, in order to save time and parchment.

Abbreviations are found especially in manuscripts of scholastic theology and canon law, annals and chronicles, the Roman law, and in administrative documents, civil and privileges, bulls, rescripts. The number of abbreviations multiplied with time, and were especially numerous during the beginning of the use of the printing press in Europe. Many early printed books display liberal use of abbreviations carried over from handwritten manuscripts, together with other characteristics of the manuscript page.

== Printing ==
The development of printing brought about the abandonment of many abbreviations, whilst also suggesting and introducing new ones. New abbreviations were also introduced following church developments such as the growth of ecclesiastical legislation and the creation of new offices.

Fewer medieval abbreviations were found in the text of books used on public occasions, such as missals, antiphonaries and Bibles, as the needs of theological students seem to have been the chief cause of the majority of medieval abbreviations.

The means of abbreviation were usually full points or dots (mostly in Roman antiquity), the semicolon (eventually conventionalized), and lines (horizontal, perpendicular, oblong, wavy curves, and commas). Vowel sounds were frequently written not after, but over, consonants. Certain letters, such as p and q, which occurred with extreme frequency in prepositions and terminations, became the source of many peculiar abbreviations, as did the frequency of words such as et ('and') and est ('is'). Habit and convenience are today the principal motives for using these abbreviations.

Most of those in actual use fall under one or other of the following heads: administrative, liturgical, scholastic, and chronological.

== Administrative ==
The first class of abbreviations, administrative ones, includes those used in the composition of Pontifical documents. They were once very numerous, and lists of them may be seen in the works of Quantin and Prou, amongst others.

Since 29 December 1878, by order of Pope Leo XIII, the great papal documents (Litterae Apostolicae) are no longer written in the old Gothic hand known as bollatico; all abbreviations, with the exception of a few obvious ones, such as S.R.E., were abolished by the same authority (Acta Sanctae Sedis, XI, 465–467). However, in everyday business, the Roman Congregations still frequently use certain brief formulas, such as negative ('no') and negative et amplius ('no with emphasis'). These are not technically abbreviations. (Note: For a list of these see Canon law.) This class includes also the abbreviations for the names of most sees. (Note: The full Latin titles of all existing (Latin) dioceses may be seen in the Roman annual, Gerarchia Cattolica. A complete list of the Latin names of all known dioceses (extant or extinct) is found in the large folio work of the Comte de Mas Latrie, Trésor de chronologie, d'histoire et de géographie (Paris, 1884). The episcopal catalogues of the Benedictine Pius Bonifacius Gams, Series Episcoporum Ecclesiae Catholicae (Ratisbon, 1873–86), and the Franciscan Conrad Eubel, Hierarchia Catholica Medii Ævi (Münster, 1898–1902), can also be consulted.)

Under the general heading of administrative abbreviations can be included abbreviated forms of address in ordinary conversation, whether referring to individuals or members of religious orders, congregations, and institutes. The forms of address used for members of Catholic lay societies and the Papal orders of merit also fall under this heading. The abbreviations of the titles of Roman Congregations, and of the individual canonical ecclesiastical authorities, belong also to this class.

== Liturgical ==
A second class of abbreviations includes those used in the description of liturgical acts or the directions for their performance, e.g. the Holy Mass, the Divine Office (Breviary), the ecclesiastical devotions, etc. The abbreviated forms for the name of God, Jesus Christ, the Holy Ghost, the names of the Blessed Virgin and the saints can also be classed as liturgical abbreviations, as can abbreviations used in the administration of the Sacraments, mortuary epitaphs (including catacomb inscriptions), and so on. Finally, some miscellaneous abbreviations, such as those used in the publication of documents concerning beatification and canonization, are also classed as liturgical.

== Scholastic ==
Scholastic abbreviations include those used to designate honorific titles acquired in the schools, to avoid the repetition of lengthy titles of books and reviews, or to facilitate reference to ecclesiastical and civil legislation.

== Chronological ==
Chronological abbreviations are used to describe elements of the year in a civil or ecclesiastical sense.

== Abbreviations used in apostolic rescripts ==
- Absoluo. – Absolutio ("Absolution")
- Alr. – Aliter ("Otherwise")
- Applica. – Apostolica ("Apostolic")
- Appatis. – Approbatis ("Having been approved")
- Archiepus. – Archiepiscopus ("Archbishop")
- Aucte. – Auctoritate ("By the Authority")
- Canice. – Canonice ("Canonically")
- Card. – Cardinalis ("Cardinal")
- Cens. – Censuris ("Censures" – abl. or dat. case)
- Circumpeone. – Circumspectione ("Circumspection" – abl. case)
- Coione. – Communione ("Communion" – abl. case)
- Confeone. – Confessione ("Confession" – abl. case)
- Consciae. – Conscientiae ("Of [or to] conscience")
- Constbus – Constitutionibus ("Constitutions" – abl. or dat. case)
- Discreoni. – Discretioni ("To the Discretion")
- Dispensao. – Dispensatio ("Dispensation")
- Dnus – Dominus ("Lord", "Sir", or "Mr.")
- Ecclae. – Ecclesiae ("Of [or to] the Church")
- Ecclis. – Ecclesiasticis ("Ecclesiastical")
- Effum. – Effectum ("Effect")
- Epus. – Episcopus ("Bishop")
- Excoe. – Excommunicatione ("Excommunication" – abl. case)
- Exit. – Existit ("Exists")
- Fr. – Frater ("Brother")
- Frum. – Fratrum ("Of the Brothers")
- Gnalis – Generalis ("General")
- Humil. – Humiliter ("Humbly")
- Humoi. – Hujusmodi ("Of this kind")
- Igr. – Igitur ("Therefore")
- Infraptum. – Infrascriptum ("Written below")
- Intropta. – Introscripta ("Written within")
- Irregulte. – Irregularitate ("Irregularity" – abl. case)
- Lia. – Licentia ("License")
- Litma. – Legitima ("Lawful")
- Lre. – Litterae ("Letters")
- Lte. – Licite ("Lawfully", or "licitly")
- Magro. – Magistro ("Master" – dat. or abl. case)
- mph. – Metaphysics
- Mir. – Misericorditer ("Mercifully")
- Miraone. – Miseratione ("Pity" – abl. case)
- Mrimonium. – Matrimonium ("Matrimony")
- Nultus. – Nullatenus ("Nowise")
- Ordinaoni. – Ordinationi ("Ordination" – dat. case)
- Ordio. – Ordinario ("Ordinary" – dat. or abl. case)
- Pbr. – Presbyter ("Priest")
- Penia. – Poenitentia ("Penance", or "repentance")
- Peniaria. – Poenitentiaria ("Penitentiary"; i.e. Bureau of the Apostolic Penitentiary)
- Pntium. – Praesentium ("Of those present", or, "Of this present writing")
- Poe. – Posse ("To be able", or, "The ability to do a thing")
- Pontus. – Pontificatus ("Pontificate")
- PP. – Papa ("Pope")
- Pr. – Pater ("Father")
- Pror. – Procurator
- Ptur. – Praefertur ("Is preferred", or, "Is brought forward")
- Ptus. – Praefatus ("Aforesaid")
- Qd. – Quod ("Because", "That", or, "Which")
- Qmlbt. – Quomodolibet ("In any manner whatsoever")
- Qtnus. – Quatenus ("Insofar as")
- Relione. – Religione ("Religion", or, "Religious Order" – abl. case)
- Rlari. – Regulari ("Regular")
- Roma. – Romana ("Roman")
- Salri. – Salutari ("Salutary")
- Snia. – Sententia ("Opinion")
- Sntae., Stae. – Sanctae ("Holy", or, "Saints" – feminine)
- Spealer. – Specialiter ("Specially")
- Spualibus – Spiritualibus ("In spiritual matters")
- Supplioni. – Supplicationibus ("Supplication" – dat. or abl. case)
- Thia, Theolia. – Theologia ("Theology")
- Tli. Tituli – ("Titles")
- Tm. – Tantum ("So much", or, "Only")
- Tn. – Tamen ("Nevertheless")
- Venebli – Venerabili ("Venerable")
- Vrae. – Vestrae ("Your")

== Abbreviations in general use, chiefly ecclesiastical ==
- A.B. – Artium Baccalaureus ("Bachelor of Arts")
- Ab. – Abbas ("Abbot")
- Abp. – Archbishop
- Abs. – Absens ("Absent")
- A.C. – Auditor Camerae (Auditor of the Papal Treasury)
- AC – Ante Christum ("Before Christ"); anno Christi
- ACN – Ante Christum Natum ("Before the Birth of Christ")
- A.D. – Anno Domini ("in the Year of the/our Lord")
- a.d. – ante diem ("The day before")
- Adm. Rev. – Admodum Reverendus ("Very Reverend")
- Adv. – Adventus ("Advent")
- Alb. – Albus ("White" – Breviary)
- al. – alii, alibi, alias ("others", "elsewhere", "otherwise")
- A.M. – Anno Mundi ("in the year of the world")
- A.M. – Artium Magister ("Master of Arts")
- A.M.D.G. – Ad Majorem Dei Gloriam ("For the greater glory of God")
- An. – Annus ("Year")
- Ann. – Anni ("Years")
- Ana, Ant. – Antiphon
- Apost. – Apostolus ("Apostle")
- Ap. Sed. – Apostolica Sedes ("Apostolic See")
- Ap. Sed. Leg. – Apostolicae Sedis Legatus ("Legate of the Apostolic See")
- Archiep. – Archiepiscopus ("Archbishop")
- Archid. – Archidiaconus ("Archdeacon")
- Archiprb. – Archipresbyter ("Archpriest")
- A.R.S. – Anno Reparatae Salutis ("In the year of Our Redemption")
- A.U. – Alma Urbs ("Beloved City" – i.e., Rome)
- Authen. – Authentica ("Authentic" – e.g. letters)
- Aux. – Auxilium, Auxilio ("Help", "With the help of")
- B.A. – Baccalaureus Artium ("Bachelor of Arts")
- B. BB. – Beatus, Beati ("Blessed")
- B.C. – Before Christ
- B.C.L. – Baccalaureus Civilis [or Canonicae] Legis ("Bachelor of Civil [or Canon] Law")
- B.D. – Bachelor of Divinity
- B.F. – Bona Fide ("In Good Faith")
- Ben. – Benedictio ("Blessing")
- Benevol. – Benevolentia ("Benevolence")
- Bon. Mem. – Bonae Memoriae ("Of Happy Memory")
- B.P. – Beatissime Pater ("Most Holy Father")
- Bro. – Brother
- B. Se. – Baccalaureus Scientiarum ("Bachelor of Sciences")
- B.U.J. – Baccalaureus Utriusque Juris ("Bachelor of Both Laws" – i.e., civil and canon)
- B.T. – Baccalaureus Theologiae ("Bachelor of Theology")
- B.V. – Beatitudo Vestra ("Your Holiness")
- B.V. – Beata Virgo ("Blessed Virgin")
- B.V.M. – Beata Virgo Maria ("Blessed Virgin Mary")
- Cam. – Camera (Papal Treasury)
- Cam. Ap. – Camera Apostolica ("Apostolic Camera" – i.e. Papal Treasury)
- Can. – Canonicus
- Canc. – Cancellarius ("Chancellor")
- Cap. – Capitulum ("Little Chapter" – Breviary)
- Cap. de seq. – Capitulum de Sequenti ("Little chapter of the following feast" – Breviary)
- Capel. – Capella ("Chapel")
- Caus. – Causa ("Cause")
- C.C. – Curatus ("Curate" – used chiefly in Ireland)
- CC. VV. – Clarissimi Viri ("Illustrious Men")
- Cen. Eccl. – Censura Ecclesiastica ("Ecclesiastical Censure")
- Cla. – Clausula ("Clause")
- Cl., Clico. – Clericus, Clerico ("Cleric")
- Clun. – Cluniacenses ("Monks of Cluny")
- C.M. – Causa Mortis ("On occasion of death")
- Cod. – Codex (Manuscript)
- Cog. Leg. – Cognatio Legalis ("Legal Cognation")
- Cog. Spir. – Cognatio Spiritualis ("Spiritual Cognation")
- Coll. Cone. – Collectio Conciliorum ("Collection of the Councils")
- Comm. Prec. – Commemoratio Praecedentis ("Commemoration of the preceding feast" – Breviary)
- Comm. Seq. – Commemoratio Sequentis ("Commemoration of the following feast" – Breviary)
- Compl. – Completorium ("Compline" – Breviary)
- Con. – Contra ("against")
- Cone. – Concilium ("Council")
- Conf. – Confessor
- Conf. Doct. – Confessor et Doctor (Breviary)
- Conf. Pont. – Confessor Pontifex ("Confessor and Bishop" – Breviary)
- Cons. – Consecratio ("Consecration")
- Consecr. – Consecratus ("Consecrated")
- Const. Ap. – Constitutio Apostolica ("Apostolic Constitution")
- Cr. – Credo ("Creed" – Breviary)
- D. – Dominus ("Lord")
- d. – dies ("day")
- D.C.L. – Doctor Civilis [or Canonicae] Legis ("Doctor of Civil [or Canon] Law")
- D.D. – Doctores ("Doctors")
- D.D. – Donum dedit; Dedicavit ("Gave", "dedicated")
- D.D. – Doctor Divinitatis ("Doctor of Divinity" – i.e. Theology)
- Dec. – Decanus ("Dean")
- Def. – Defunctus ("Deceased")
- D.G. – Dei Gratia ("By the Grace of God")
- D.N. – Dominus Noster ("Our Lord")
- D.N.J.C. – Dominus Noster Jesus Christus ("Our Lord Jesus Christ")
- DN, DNS, DNUS – Dominus ("Lord")
- Doct. – Doctor (Breviary)
- Dom. – Dominica ("Sunday")
- D.O.M. – Deo Optimo Maximo ("To God, the Best and Greatest")
- Doxol. – Doxologia ("Doxology" – Breviary)
- D.R. – Decanus Ruralis ("Rural Dean")
- DS – Deus ("God")
- D.Se. – Doctor Scientiarum ("Doctor of Sciences")
- D.V. – Deo Volente ("God willing")
- Dupl. – Duplex ("Double feast" – Breviary)
- Dupl. Maj. – Duplex Major ("Double Major feast")
- Dupl. I. Cl. – Duplex Primae Classis ("Double First Class feast" – Breviary)
- Dupl. II. Cl. – Duplex Secundae Classis ("Double Second Class feast" – Breviary)
- Eccl. – Ecclesiasticus ("Ecclesiastic")
- E., Eccl. – Ecclesia ("The Church")
- El. – Electio, Electus ("Election", "Elect")
- Emus – Eminentissimus ("Most Eminent")
- EPS, EP., Episc. – Episcopus ("Bishop")
- Et. – Etiam ("Also, Even")
- Evang. – Evangelium ("Gospel" – Breviary)
- Ex. – Extra ("Outside of")
- Exe. – Excommunicatus, Excommunicatio ("Excommunicated, Excommunication")
- Fel. Mem. – Felicis Memoriae ("Of Happy Memory")
- Fel. Rec. – Felicis Recordationis ("Of Happy Memory")
- Fer. – Feria ("Weekday")
- Fr., F. – Frater, Frere ("Brother")
- Fund. – Fundatio ("Foundation")
- Gen. – Generalis ("General")
- Gl. – Gloria ("Glory to God", etc.)
- Gr. – Gratia ("Grace")
- Grad. – Gradus ("Grade")
- Grat. – Gratias ("Thanks"); or Gratis ("Without expense")
- hebd. – Hebdomada ("Week")
- Hom. – Homilia ("Homily" – Breviary)
- hor. – hora ("hour")
- IC – Jesus (first and third letters of His name in Greek)
- Id. – Idus ("Ides")
- Igr. – Igitur ("Therefore")
- IHS – Jesus (a faulty Latin transliteration of the first three letters of *JESUS in Greek (ΙΗΣ); sometimes misinterpreted as Iesus Hominum Salvator "Jesus Saviour of Men"
- Ind. – Indictio ("Indiction")
- Ind. – Index
- Inq. – Inquisitio ("Inquisition")
- i.p.i. – in partibus infidelium ("among the infidels")
- Is. – Idus ("Ides")
- J.C. – Jesus Christus ("Jesus Christ")
- J.C.D. – Juris Canonici Doctor, Juris Civilis Doctor ("Doctor of Canon Law", "Doctor of Civil Law")
- J.D. – Juris Doctor ("Doctor of Law")
- J.M.J. – Jesus, Maria, Joseph ("Jesus, Mary, Joseph")
- Jo., Joann. – Joannes ("John")
- J.U.D. – Juris Utriusque Doctor ("Doctor of Both Laws" – Civil and Canon)
- Jud. – Judicium ("Judgment")
- J.U.L. – Juris Utriusque Licentiatus ("Licentiate of Both Laws")
- Jur. – Juris ("Of Law")
- Kal. – Kalendae ("Calends")
- Laic. – Laicus ("Layman")
- Laud. – Laudes ("Lauds" – Breviary)
- L.C.D. – Legis Civilis Doctor ("Doctor of Civil Law")
- l.c.; loc. cit. – Loco citato ("at the place already cited")
- Lect. – Lectio ("Lesson")
- Legit. – Legitime, Legitimus ("Legally", "legitimate")
- L.H.D. – Litterarum Humaniorum Doctor ("Doctor of Literature")
- Lib., Lo. – Liber, Libro ("Book", "In the book")
- Lic. – Licentia, Licentiatus ("License", "Licentiate")
- Litt. – Littera ("Letter")
- LL.B. – Legum Baccalaureus ("Bachelor of Laws")
- LL.D. – Legum Doctor ("Doctor of Laws")
- LL.M. – Legum Magister ("Master of Laws")
- Loc. – Locus ("Place")
- Lov. – Lovanium ("Louvain")
- Lovan. – Lovanienses (Theologians of Louvain)
- L.S. – Loco Sigilli ("Place of the Seal")
- Lud. – Ludovicus
- M. – Maria ("Mary")
- M.A. – Magister Artium ("Master of Arts")
- Mag. – Magister ("Master")
- Mand. – Mandamus ("We command")
- Mand. Ap. – Mandatum Apostolicum ("Apostolic Mandate", e.g. for a bishop's consecration)
- Mart., M., MM. – Martyr, Martyres ("Martyr", "Martyrs" – Breviary)
- Mat. – Matutinum ("Matins" – Breviary)
- Matr. – Matrimonum ("Marriage")
- Mgr., Msgr., or Mons. – Monsignor ("My Lord")
- Miss. – Missa ("Mass" – Breviary); Missionarius ("Missionary")
- Miss. Apost., M.A. – Missionarius Apostolicus ("Missionary Apostolic")
- mph., mp. – Metaphysics
- M.R. – Missionarius Rector ("Missionary Rector")
- m.t.v. – mutatur terminatio versiculi ("the termination of the little verse is changed" – Breviary)
- Mr. – Mother
- Nativ. D.N.J.C. – Nativitas Domini Nostri Jesu Christi ("Nativity of Our Lord Jesus Christ")
- N. D. – Nostra Domina, Notre Dame ("Our Lady")
- Nigr. – Niger ("Black" – Breviary)
- No. – Nobis ("to us", "for us")
- Nob. – Nobilis, Nobiles ("Noble", "Nobles")
- Noct. – Nocturnum ("Nocturn")
- Non. – Nonae ("Nones")
- Nostr. – Noster, nostri ("Our", "of our")
- Not. – Notitia ("Knowledge")
- N.S. – Notre Seigneur, Nostro Signore ("Our Lord")
- N.S. – New Style
- N.T. – Novum Testamentum ("New Testament")
- Ntri. – Nostri ("Of our")
- Nup. – Nuptiae ("Nuptials")
- Ob. – Obiit ("Died")
- Oct. – Octava ("Octave" – Breviary)
- Omn. – Omnes, Omnibus ("All", "to all")
- Op. Cit. – Opere Citato ("In the work cited")
- Or. – Oratio ("Prayer" – Breviary)
- Ord. – Ordo, Ordinatio, Ordinarius ("Order", "Ordination", "Ordinary")
- Or. Orat. – Orator ("Petitioner"), Oratorium ("Oratory")
- O.S. – Old Style
- O.T. – Old Testament
- Oxon. – Oxonium, Oxonienses ("Oxford", "Theologians or Scholars of Oxford")
- P. – Pater, Pere ("Father")
- Pa. – Papa ("Pope"); Pater ("Father")
- Pact. – Pactum ("Agreement")
- Pasch. – Pascha ("Easter" – Breviary)
- Patr. – Patriarcha ("Patriarch")
- Pent. – Pentecostes ("Pentecost" – Breviary)
- Ph. B. – Philosophiae Baccalaureus ("Bachelor of Philosophy")
- Ph.D. – Philosophiae Doctor ("Doctor of Philosophy")
- Phil. – Philosophia ("Philosophy")
- Ph. M. – Philosophiae Magister ("Master of Philosophy")
- P.K. – Pridie Kalendas ("The day before the Calends")
- Poenit. – Poenitentia ("Penance")
- Poenit. Ap. – Poenitentiaria Apostolica ("Office of the Apostolic Penitentiary")
- Pont. – Pontifex ("Pontiff", i.e. Bishop—Breviary)
- Pont. – Pontificatus ("Pontificate")
- Pont. Max. – Pontifex Maximus ("Supreme Pontiff")
- Poss. – Possessor, Possessio ("Possessor", "Possession")
- PP. – Papa ("Pope"); Pontificum ("Of the popes")
- P.P. – Parochus ("Parish Priest" – used mostly in Ireland)
- PP. AA. – Patres Amplissimi ("Cardinals")
- P.P.P. – Propria Pecunia Posuit ("Erected at his own expense")
- P.R. – Permanens Rector ("Permanent Rector")
- Pr. – Pastor
- Praef. – Praefatio ("Preface" of the Mass—Breviary)
- Presbit. – Presbyter, Priest
- Prof. – Professus, Professio, Professor ("Professed", "Profession", "Professor")
- Prop. Fid. – Propaganda Fide (Congregation of the Propaganda, Rome)
- Propr. – Proprium ("Proper" – Breviary)
- Prov. – Provisio, Provisum ("Provision", "Provided")
- Ps. – Psalmus ("Psalm")
- Pub., Publ. – Publicus, Publice ("Public", "Publicly")
- Purg. Can. – Purgatio Canonica ("Canonical Disculpation")
- Quadrag. – Quadragesima ("Lent", also the "Fortieth day" before Easter—Breviary)
- Quinquag. – Quinquagesima (The "Fiftieth day" before Easter—Breviary)
- R. – Responsorium ("Responsory" – Breviary)
- R. – Roma (Rome)
- Rescr. – Rescriptum ("Rescript")
- R.D. – Rural Dean
- Req. – Requiescat ("May he [or she] rest", i.e. in peace)
- Resp. – Responsum ("Reply")
- R.I.P. – Requiescat In Pace ("May he or she rest in peace")
- Rit. – Ritus ("Rite", "Rites")
- Rom. – Romanus, Romana ("Roman")
- R.P. – Reverendus Pater, Reverend Pere ("Reverend Father")
- RR. – Rerum ("Of Things, Subjects" – e.g. SS. RR. Ital., Writers on Italian [historical] subjects); Regesta
- Rt. Rev. – Right Reverend
- Rub. – Ruber ("Red" – Breviary)
- Rubr. – Rubrica ("Rubric")
- S., Sacr. – Sacrum ("Sacred")
- Sab., Sabb. – Sabbatum ("Sabbath", Saturday)
- Saec. – Saeculum (Century)
- Sal. – Salus, Salutis ("Salvation", "of Salvation")
- Salmant. – Salmanticenses (Theologians of Salamanca)
- S.C. – Sacra Congregatio ("Sacred Congregation")
- S.C.C. – Sacra Congregatio Concilii ("Sacred Congregation of the Council", i.e. of Trent)
- S.C.EE.RR. – Sacra Congregatio Episcoporum et Regularium ("Sacred Congregation of Bishops and Regulars")
- S.C.I. – Sacra Congregatio Indicis ("Sacred Congregation of the Index")
- S.C.P.F. – Sacra Congregatio de Propaganda Fide ("Sacred Congregation for the Propagation of the Faith")
- SCS – Sanctus ("Saint")
- s.d. – sine data ("without indication of date of printing", undated book)
- S.D. – Servus Dei (Servant of God)
- Semid. – Semiduplex ("Semi" double feast—Breviary)
- Septuag – Septuagesima ("Seventieth day" before Easter; always a Sunday—Breviary)
- Sexag. – Sexagesima ("Sixtieth day" before Easter—Breviary)
- Sig. – Sigillum ("Seal")
- Simpl. – Simplex ("Simple" feast—Breviary)
- Sine Com. – Sine Commemoratione ("Without commemoration" of other feast, or feasts—Breviary)
- s.l. – sine loco ("without indication of place of printing")
- s.l.n.d. – sine loco nec data ("without indication of place and date of printing")
- S.M. – Sanctae Memoriae ("Of Holy Memory")
- Soc. – Socius, Socii ("Companion", "Companions" – Breviary)
- S. Off. – Sanctum Officium (Congregation of the Holy Office, Inquisition)
- S.P. – Sanctissime Pater ("Most Holy Father")
- S.P., S. Petr. – Sanctus Petrus ("St. Peter")
- S.P. – Summus Pontifex ("Supreme Pontiff", Pope)
- S.P.A. – Sacrum Palatium Apostolicum ("Sacred Apostolic Palace", Vatican, Quirinal)
- Sr. – Sister
- S.R.C. – Sacra Rituum Congregatio ("Sacred Congregation of Rites")
- S.R.E. – Sancta Romana Ecclesia, Sanctae Romanae Ecclesiae ("Most Holy Roman Church"; or, "of the Most Holy Roman Church")
- SS. – Scriptores ("Writers")
- SS.D.N. – Sanctissimus Dominus Noster ("Our Most Holy Lord [Jesus Christ]", also a title of the Pope)
- SS., S. – Sanctus, Sancti ("Saint", "Saints")
- S.T.B. – Sacrae Theologiae Baccalaureus ("Bachelor of Sacred Theology")
- S.T.D. – Sacrae Theologiae Doctor ("Doctor of Sacred Theology")
- S.T.L. – Sacrae Theologiae Licentiatus ("Licentiate of Sacred Theology")
- S.T.P. – Sanctae Theologiae Professor ("Professor of Sacred Theology")
- Suffr. – Suffragia ("Suffrages" – i.e. prayers of the saints; Breviary)
- S.V. – Sanctitas Vestra ("Your Holiness")
- Syn. – Synodus ("Synod")
- Temp. – Tempus, Tempore ("Time", "in time")
- Test. – Testes, Testimonium ("Witnesses", "Testimony")
- Theol. – Theologia ("Theology")
- Tit. – Titulus, Tituli ("Title", "Titles")
- T.R.P. – Très Révérend Père ("Very Reverend Father")
- Ult. – Ultimo ("Last" – day, month, year)
- Usq. – Usque ("As far as")
- Ux. – Uxor ("Wife")
- V., Ven., VV. – Venerabilis, Venerabiles ("Venerable")
- V., Vest. – Vester ("Your")
- Vac. – Vacat, Vacans ("Vacant")
- Val. – Valor ("Value")
- Vat. – Vaticanus ("Vatican")
- Vba. – Verba ("Words")
- Vers. – Versiculus ("Versicle" – Breviary)
- Vesp. – Vesperae ("Vespers" – Breviary)
- V.F., Vic. For. – Vicarius Foraneus ("Vicar-Forane")
- V.G. – Vicarius Generalis ("Vicar-General")
- Vic. – Vicar
- Vid. – Vidua ("Widow" – Breviary)
- Vid., Videl. – Videlicet ("Namely")
- Vig. – Vigilia ("Vigil" of a feast—Breviary)
- Viol. – Violaceus ("Violet" – Breviary)
- Virg. – Virgo ("Virgin" – Breviary)
- Virid. – Viridis ("Green" – Breviary)
- V.M. – Vir Magnificus ("Great Man")
- V. Rev. – Very Reverend
- V.T. – Vetus Testamentum
- XC., XCS. – Christus ("Christ" – first, middle, and last letters of the Greek name)

== Abbreviations in catacomb inscriptions ==
- A.D. – Ante Diem (e.g. in the phrase, "Ante Diem VI [or Sextum] Kal. Apriles", is equivalent to the sixth day before the Calends of April, counting both the Calends and the day intended to be indicated); or Anima Dulcis ("Sweet Soul")
- A.Q.I.C. – Anima Quiescat In Christo ("May his [or her] Soul Repose in Christ")
- B., BMT. – Bene Merenti ("To the Well-Deserving")
- B.M. – Bonae Memoriae ("Of Happy Memory")
- B.F. – Bonae Feminae ("To the Good Woman")
- B.I.C. – Bibas [for Vivas] In Christo ("May you Live In Christ")
- B.M.F. – Bene Merenti Fecit ("He erected this to the Well-Deserving")
- B.Q. – Bene Quiescat ("May he [or she] Rest Well")
- C. – Consul
- CC. – Consules ("Consuls")
- C.F. – Clarissima Femina ("Most Illustrious Woman")
- Cl. V. – Clarissimus Vir ("Most Illustrious Man")
- C.O. – Conjugi Optimo ("To my Excellent Husband")
- C.O.B.Q. – Cum Omnibus Bonis Quiescat ("May he [or she] Repose With All Good souls")
- COI. – Conjugi ("To my Husband [or Wife]")
- CS., COS. – Consul
- COSS. – Consules ("Consuls")
- C.P. – Clarissima Puella ("Most Illustrious Maiden")
- D. – Depositus ("Laid to rest"); or Dulcis ("Dear One")
- D.D. – Dedit, Dedicavit ("Gave", "Dedicated")
- DEP. – Depositus ("Laid to rest")
- D.I.P. – Dormit In Pace ("Sleeps in Peace")
- D.M. – Diis Manibus ("To the Manes [of]")
- D.M.S. – Diis Manibus Sacrum ("Sacred to the Manes [of]")
- D.N. – Domino Nostro ("To Our Lord")
- DD. NN. – Dominis Nostris ("To Our Lords")
- E.V. – Ex Voto ("In Fulfilment of a Vow")
- EX. TM. – Ex Testamento ("In accordance with the Testament of")
- E VIV. DISC. – E Vivis Discessit ("Departed from Life")
- F. – Fecit ("Did"); or Filius ("Son"); or Feliciter ("Happily")
- F.C. – Fieri Curavit ("Caused to be made")
- F.F. – Fieri Fecit ("Caused to be made")
- FF. – Fratres ("Brothers"); Filii ("Sons")
- FS. – Fossor ("Digger")
- H. – Haeres ("Heir"); Hic ("Here")
- H.L.S. – Hoc Loco Situs ("Laid [or Put] in This Place")
- H.M.F.F. – Hoc Monumentum Fieri Fecit ("Caused This Monument to be Made")
- H.S. – Hic Situs ("Laid Here")
- ID. – Idibus ("On the Ides")
- IDNE. – Indictione ("In the Indiction" – a chronological term)
- I.L.H. – Jus Liberorum Habens ("Possessing the Right of Children" – i.e., eligibility to public office under age)
- INB. – In Bono ("In Good [odour]")
- IND. – Same as IDNE
- INP – In Pace ("In Peace")
- I.X. – In Christo ("In Christ")
- K. – Kalendas ("Calends"); or Care, Carus, Cara ("Dear One"); or Carissimus[a] ("Dearest")
- K.B.M. – Karissimo Bene Merenti ("To the Most Dear and Well-deserving")
- L. – Locus ("Place")
- L.M. – Locus Monumenti ("Place of the Monument")
- L.S. – Locus Sepulchri ("Place of the Sepulchre")
- M. – Martyr, or Memoria ("Memory") or Monumentum ("Monument")
- MM. – Martyres ("Martyrs")
- M.P. – Monumentum Posuit ("Erected a Monument")
- MRT. – Merenti ("To the Deserving")
- N. – Nonas ("Nones"); or Numero ("Number")
- NN. – Nostris ("To Our" – with a plural) or Numeri ("Numbers")
- O. – Hora ("Hour"); Obiit ("Died")
- OB. IN XTO. – Obiit In Christo ("Died In Christ")
- OMS. – Omnes ("All")
- OP. – Optimus (Excellent, or Supremely Good)
- P. – Pax ("Peace"); or Pius ("Dutiful"); or Ponendum ("To be Placed"); or Pridie ("The Day Before"); or Plus ("More")
- P.C. – Poni Curavit ("Caused to be Placed")
- P.C., P. CONS. – Post Consulatum ("After the Consulate")
- P.I. – Poni Jussit ("Ordered to be Placed")
- P.M. – Plus Minus ("More or Less"); or Piae Memoriae ("Of Pious Memory"); or Post Mortem ("After Death")
- PP. – Praepositus ("Placed over")
- PR.K. – Pridie Kalendas ("The Day Before the Calends")
- PRB. – Presbyter ("Priest")
- PR.N. – Pridie Nonas ("The Day Before the Nones")
- P.T.C.S. – Pax Tibi Cum Sanctis ("Peace to Thee With the Saints")
- PZ. – Pie Zeses ("May you Live Piously" – Greek)
- Q., Qui. – Quiescit ("He Rests")
- Q.B.AN. – Qui Bixit [for Vixit] Annos ("Who lived ... years")
- Q.I.P. – Quiescat In Pace ("May he [or she] Rest in Peace")
- Q.V. – Qui Vixit ("Who Lived")
- R. – Requiescit ("He Rests"); or Refrigerio ("In [a place of] Refreshment")
- Reg. – Regionis ("Of the Region")
- S. – Suus ("His"), or Situs ("Placed"), or Sepulchrum ("Sepulchre")
- SC. M. – Sanctae Memoriae ("Of Holy Memory")
- SD. – Sedit ("He sat")
- SSA. – Subscripta ("Subscribed")
- S.I.D. – Spiritus In Deo ("Spirit [rests] in God")
- S.P. – Sepultus ("Buried"), or Sepulchrum ("Sepulchre")
- SS. – Sanctorum (Of the Saints)
- S.V. – Sacra Virgo ("Holy Virgin")
- T., TT. – Titulus, Tituli ("Title", "Titles")
- TM. – Testamentum ("Testament")
- V. – Vixit ("He Lived"), or Vixisti ("Thou didst Live")
- VB. – Vir Bonus ("A Good Man")
- V.C. – Vir Clarissimus ("A Most Illustrious Man")
- VV. CC. – Viri Clarissimi ("Most Illustrious Men")
- V.H. – Vir Honestus ("A Worthy Man")
- V. X. – Vivas, Care (or Cara) ("Mayest thou Live, Dear One"), or Uxor Carissima ("Most Dear Wife")
- X., XPC., XS. – Christus ("Christ")

== Abbreviations of titles of the principal religious orders and congregations of priests ==
- A.A. – Augustiniani Assumptionis (Assumptionists)
- A.B.A. – Antoniani Benedictini Armeni (Mechitarists)
- C.J.M. – Congregatio Jesu et Mariae (Eudist Fathers)
- C.M. – Congregatio Missionis (Lazarists)
- C.M. – Congregatio Mariae (Fathers of the Company of Mary)
- C.P. – Congregatio Passionis (Passionists)
- C.PP.S. – Congregatio Pretiosissimi Sanguinis (Fathers of the Most Precious Blood)
- C.R. – Congregatio Resurrectionis (Resurrectionist Fathers)
- C.R.C.S. – Clerici Regulares Congregationis Somaschae (Somaschi Fathers)
- C.R.I.C. – Canonici Regulares Immaculatae Conceptionis ("Canons Regular of the Immaculate Conception")
- C.R.L. – Canonici Regulares Lateranenses ("Canons Regular of the Lateran")
- C.R.M. – Clerici Regulares Minores ("Clerks Regular Minor", Mariani)
- C.R.M.D. – Clerici Regulares Matris Dei ("Clerks Regular of the Mother of God")
- C.R.M.I. – Clerici Regulares Ministrantes Infirmis ("Clerks Regular Attendant on the Sick", Camillini, Camilliani)
- C.R.P. – Congregatio Reformatorum Praemonstratensium (Premonstratensians)
- C.R.S.P. – Clerici Regulares Sancti Pauli (Barnabites)
- C.R.S.P. – Clerici Regulares Pauperum Matris Dei Scholarum Piarum ("Clerks Regular of the Poor Men of the Mother of God for Pious Schools", Piarists)
- C.R.T. – Clerici Regulares Theatini (Theatines)
- C.S.B. – Congregatio Sancti Basilii (Basilians)
- C.S.C. – Congregatio A Sancta Cruce (Congregation of Holy Cross)
- C.S.P. – Congregatio Sancti Pauli (Paulists)
- C.S. Sp. – Congregatio Sancti Spiritus (Holy Ghost Fathers, Spiritans)
- C.S.V. – Clerici Sancti Viatoris (Clerks, or Clerics, of St. Viateur)
- C.SS.CC. – Congregatio Sacratissimorum Cordium (Missionaries of the Sacred Hearts of Jesus and Mary)
- C. SS. R. – Congregatio Sanctissimi Redemptoris (Redemptorists)
- F.S.S.P. – Fraternitas Sacerdotalis Sancti Petri (Priestly Fraternity of Saint Peter)
- F.S.S.P.X – Fraternitas Sacerdotalis Sancti Pii X (Society of Saint Pius X)
- I.C.R.S.S. – Institutum Christi Regis Summi Sacerdotis (Institute of Christ the King Sovereign Priest)
- Inst. Char. – Institutum C(h)aritatis (Rosminians)
- L.C. – Legio Christi (Legionaries of Christ)
- M.C. – Missionaries of Charity
- M.S. – Missionaries of La Salette (France)
- M.S.C. – Missionarii Sancti Caroli ("Missionaries of St. Charles")
- M.S.C. – Missionarii Sacratissimi Cordis ("Missionaries of the Most Sacred Heart")
- O.C. – Ordo C(h)aritatis (Fathers of the Order of Charity)
- O. Camald. – Ordo Camaldulensium (Camaldolese)
- O. Cart. – Ordo Cartusiensis (Carthusians)
- O. Cist. – Ordo Cisterciensium (Cistercians)
- O.C.C. – Ordo Carmelitarum Calceatorum (Carmelites)
- O.C.D. – Ordo Carmelitarum Discalceatorum (Discalced, Barefoot Carmelites)
- O.C.R. – Ordo Reformatorum Cisterciensium (Cistercians, Trappists)
- O.F.M. – Ordo Fratrum Minorum (Observant Franciscans)
- O.F.M. Rec. – Order of Friars Minor Recollects
- O.M. – Ordo [Fratrum] Minimorum (Minims of St. Francis of Paola)
- O. Merced. – Ordo Beatae Mariae Virginis de Redemptione Captivorum (Mercedarians, Nolaschi)
- O.M.C. – Ordo Minorum Conventualium (Conventual Franciscans)
- O.M. Cap., O.F.M. Cap., O.M.C. – Ordo Minorum Cappucinorum (Capuchins)
- O.M.I. – Oblati Mariae Immaculatae (Oblate Fathers of Mary Immaculate)
- O.P., Ord. Fratr. Praed. – Ordo Praedicatorum (Dominicans)
- Ord. Praem. – Ordo Praemonstratensium (Premonstratensians, Norbertines)
- O.S.A. – Ordo [Eremitarum] Sancti Augustini (Augustinians)
- O.S.B. – Ordo Sancti Benedicti (Benedictines)
- O.S.C. – Oblati Sancti Caroli (Oblate Fathers of St. Charles)
- O.S.F.C. – Ordinis Sancti Francisci Capuccini (Franciscan Capuchins)
- O.S.F.S. – Oblati Sancti Francisci Salesii (Oblate Fathers of St. Francis of Sales)
- O.S.H. – Ordo [Eremitarum] Sancti Hieronymi (Hieronymites)
- O.S.M. – Ordo Servorum Mariae (Servites)
- O.S.P.P.E. – Ordo Sancti Pauli Primi Eremitae (Pauline Fathers)
- O.SS.C. – Oblati Sacratissimi Cordis (Oblate Fathers of the Sacred Heart)
- O. Trinit. – Ordo Sanctissimae Trinitatis (Trinitarians)
- P.O. – Pretres de l'Oratoire, Presbyteri Oratorii (Oratorians)
- P.S.M. – Pia Societas Missionum (Fathers of the Pious Society of Missions, Pallottini)
- P.S.S. – Presbyteri Sancti Sulpicii, Pretres de S. Sulpice (Sulpicians)
- S.C. – Salesianorum Congregatio (Congregation of St. Francis of Sales – Salesian Fathers)
- S.D.S. – Societas Divini Salvatoris (Society of the Divine Saviour)
- S.V.D. – Societas Verbi Divini (Divine Word Missionaries – Steyler Missionaries, Verbites)
- S.J. – Societas Jesu (Society of Jesus – Jesuits)
- S.M. – Societas Mariae (Marists)
- S.M.O.C.S.G. – Sacer Militaris Ordo Constantinianus Sancti Georgii (Sacred Military Constantinian Order of Saint George)
- S.M.O.M. – Supremus Militaris Ordo Melitensis (Sovereign Military Order of Malta)
- S.P.M. – Societas Patrum Misericordiae (Fathers of Mercy)
- S.J.C. – Canonici Regulares Sancti Joannis Cantii (Canons Regular of Saint John Cantius)
- S.S.C. – Columban Fathers (Missionary Society of St Columban)
- S.S.S. – Societas Sanctissimi Sacramenti (Congregation of the Blessed Sacrament)
- S.T.S. – Societas Trinitatis Sanctae (Society of the Holy Trinity)

== See also ==
- List of classical abbreviations
- List of Latin abbreviations
- List of medieval abbreviations
- List of Latin phrases
