= Ante Christum natum =

Calendar era term

The term ante Christum natum (Latin for 'before Christ [was] born'), usually abbreviated to a. Chr. n., a.Ch.n., a.C.n., A.C.N., or ACN, denotes the years before the birth of Jesus. It is a Latin equivalent to the English "BC" ("before Christ"). The phrase ante Christum natum is also seen shortened to ante Christum ("before Christ"), similarly abbreviated to a. Chr., A. C. or AC. A related phrase, p. Chr. n., p. Ch. n., P.C.M, PCN, or post Christum natum complements a. Ch. n. and is equivalent to anno Domini (AD).

In English, these phrases are rare and AC, ACN, and ante Christum natum are not in the Chicago Manual of Style (14th edition), the American Heritage Dictionary (3rd edition), or P. Kenneth Seidelmann's Explanatory Supplement to the Astronomical Almanac (1992, University Science Books). In other European languages, such as Italian ("a.c." or "a.C." for avanti Cristo), a vernacular version is the standard term.

The Anglo-Saxon historian Bede used the Latin phrase ante incarnationis dominicae tempus ("before the time of the Incarnation of the Lord") in his Historia ecclesiastica gentis Anglorum (Ecclesiastical History of the English People) (Book 1, Chapter 2) of 731 PCN, and thereby became the first author to describe a year as being before Christ. Both Dionysius Exiguus and Saint Bede, who was familiar with the work of the former, regarded Anno Domini 1 as beginning on the date of the Incarnation of Jesus Christ, yet "the distinction between Incarnation and Nativity was not drawn until the late 9th century, when in some places the Incarnation epoch was identified with Christ's conception, i. e., the Annunciation on March 25".

== See also ==
- Chronology of Jesus
- Common Era
- List of ecclesiastical abbreviations
- Nativity of Jesus

== Sources ==
- Blackburn, Bonnie; Holford-Strevens, Leofranc (2003) [1999]. The Oxford companion to the year (Reprinted ed.). Oxford.
