= Op. cit. =

Latin abbreviation

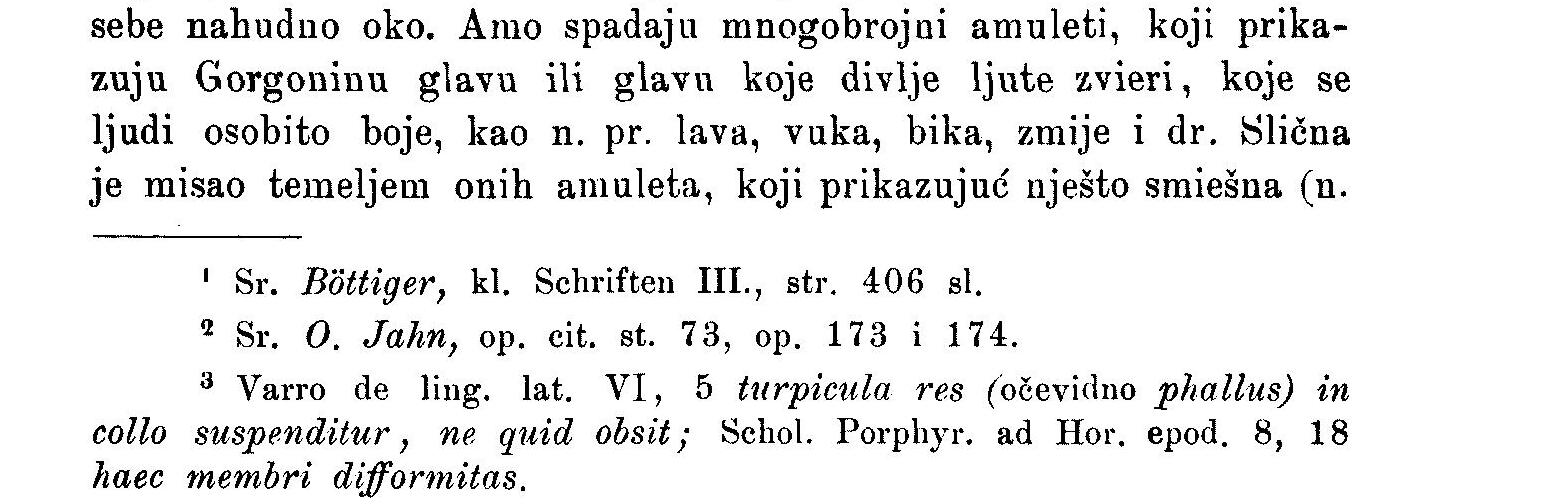
Op.cit. footnote

Op. cit. is an abbreviation of the Latin phrase opus citatum or opere citato, meaning 'the work cited' or 'in the cited work', respectively.

== Overview ==
The abbreviation is used in an endnote or footnote to refer the reader to a cited work, standing in for repetition of the full title of the work. Op. cit. thus refers the reader to the bibliography, where the full citation of the work can be found, or to a full citation given in a previous footnote. Op. cit. should never, therefore, be used on its own, which would be meaningless, but most often with the author's surname, or another brief clue as to which work is referred to. For example, given a work called The World of Salamanders (1999) by Jane Q. Smith, the style would typically be "Smith op. cit.", usually followed by a page number, to refer the reader to a previous full citation of this work (or with further clarification such as "Smith 1999, op. cit." or "Smith, World of Salamanders, op. cit.", if two sources by that author are cited). Given names or initials are not needed unless the work cites two authors with the same surname, as the whole purpose of using op. cit. is the economy of text. For works without an individually named author, the title can be used, e.g. "CIA World Fact Book, op. cit." As usual with foreign words and phrases, op. cit. is typically given in italics. The variant Loc. cit., an abbreviation of the Latin phrase loco citato meaning "in the place cited", has been used for the same purpose but also indicating the same page not simply the same work; it is now rarely used or recognized.

The Chicago Manual of Style, 16th edition, claims that op. cit. and loc. cit. are "rightly falling into disuse", and "instead uses the short-title form", e.g. the form World of Salamanders, to use the example above. Various different styles call for other alternatives, such as a reference to the author's surname and publication year, e.g. "Smith 1999".

Op. cit. is contrasted with ibid., an abbreviation of the Latin adverb ibidem, meaning "in the same place; in that very place" which refers the reader to the title of the work in the preceding footnote. The easily confused idem (sometimes abbreviated id.), the Latin definitive pronoun meaning "the same" is also used on occasion (especially in legal writing) within footnotes, and is a stand-in for the last-cited author, rather than title. The Latin adverb supra, meaning "above", means simply "see above" and can therefore be somewhat imprecise.

== Examples ==
Footnotes 9 to 15:

- (9) R. Millan, Art of Latin Grammar (Academic: New York, 1997), p. 23.
- (10) G. Wiki, Language and Its Uses (Blah Ltd.: London, 2000), p. 217.
- (11) G. Wiki, Towards a More Perfect Speech (Blah Ltd.: London, 2003), p. 354.
- (12) G. Wiki, I Say, You Say (Blah Ltd.: London, 2003), p. 35.
- (13) Millan, op. cit., p. 5.
- (14) Wiki 2000, op. cit., p. 66.
- (15) Wiki, I Say, You Say, op. cit., p. 4.

Reference number 13 refers to the last cited work by the author R. Millan, and hence, it is the same as in number 9 (R. Millan, Art of Latin Grammar), although the page referred to is different. Reference number 14 refers to reference number 10, Language and Its Uses (because the work was published in 2000), page 66. Reference number 15 refers to reference number 12: there are two works by Wiki published in 2003 so you must use the title.

For the short-title form:

- (9) R. Millan, Art of Latin Grammar (Academic: New York, 1997), p. 23.
- (10) G. Wiki, Language and Its Uses (Blah Ltd.: London, 2000), p. 217.
- (11) G. Wiki, Towards a More Perfect Speech (Blah Ltd.: London, 2003), p. 354
- (12) G. Wiki, I Say, You Say (Blah Ltd.: London, 2003), p. 35
- (13) Art of Latin Grammar, p. 5.
- (14) Language and Its Uses, p. 66.
- (15) I Say, You Say, p. 4.

This is exactly the same as the long form above.

== See also ==
- Bibliography
- MLA style (may or may not apply to APA style)
