= Loc. cit. =

Latin footnote or endnote term referring to the preceding work and page number

Loc. cit. (Latin, short for loco citato, meaning "in the place cited") is a footnote or endnote term used to repeat the title and page number for a given work (and author). Loc. cit. is used in place of ibid. when the reference is not only to the work immediately preceding, but also refers to the same page. Therefore, loc. cit. is never followed by volume or page numbers. Loc. cit. may be contrasted with op. cit. (opere citato, "in the work cited"), in which reference is made to a work previously cited, but to a different page within that work.

== Sample usage ==
- Example 1:

9. R. Millan, "Art of Latin grammar" (Academic, New York, 1997), p. 23.

10. Loc. cit.

Explanation: The loc. cit. in reference #10 refers to reference #9 in its entirety, including the page number.

- Example 2:

9. R. Millan, "Art of Latin grammar" (Academic, New York, 1997), p. 23.

10. G. Wiki, "Blah and its uses" (Blah Ltd., Old York, 2000), p. 12.

11. Millan, loc. cit.

Explanation: The loc. cit. in reference #11 refers to reference #9, including the page number.

== See also ==
- Bibliography
- Ibid.
- Op. cit.
- MLA style
