= Supra (grammar) =

Academic or legal citation signal

Supra (Latin for "above") is an academic and legal citation signal used when a writer desires to refer a reader to an earlier-cited authority.

For example, an author wanting to refer to a source in their third footnote could cite this as: "See supra note 3". Or for text in that note: "See supra text accompanying note 3". Traditionally Vide (Latin for "see" or more broadly "perceive") would be used instead of see, so those citations would instead be written as "Vide supra — note 3" and "Vide supra — text accompanying note 3".

Supra can also be used to provide a short form citation to an earlier (but not immediately preceding) authority. For example:

1. Stephen J. Legatzke, Note, The Equitable Recoupment Doctrine in United States v. Dalm: Where's the Equity, 10 Va. Tax Rev. 861 (1991).
2. Legatzke, supra note 1, at 862.

In this example, the second citation refers the reader to page 862 in the journal in which the article by Legatzke appears. The use of supra should be done with care and only when the user fully understands its usage as it could be very confusing to readers if not used appropriately.

More generally, the phrase vide supra or v.s., often enclosed in parentheses, is used simply to refer the reader to preceding text.

== See also ==
- Bibliography
- Ibid.
- Op. cit.
- Infra, a Latin word meaning "below, beneath or underneath."
