= List of classical Latin abbreviations =

The following list contains a selection from the Latin abbreviations that occur in the writings and inscriptions of the Romans. A few other non-classical Latin abbreviations are added.

== A ==
- A. – Absolvo, Actum, Aedilis, Aes, Ager, Ago, Aio, Amicus, Annus, Antiquo, Auctor, Auditor, Augustus, Aulus, Aurum, Aut.
- A.A. – Aes alienum, Ante audita, Apud agrum, Aurum argentum.
- AA. – Augusti duo.
- AAA. – Augusti tres.
- A.A.A.F.F. – Auro argento aere flando feriundo. or Aere Argento Auro Flando Feriundo.
- A.A.V. – Alter ambove.
- A.C. – Acta causa, Alius civis.
- A.D. – Ante diem
- A.D.V. – Ante diem quintum.
- A.D.A. – Ad dandos agros.
- AEO. – Aedes, Aedilis, Aedilitas.
- AEM., AIM. – Aemilius, Aemilia.
- AER. – Aerarium.
- AER.P. – Aere publico.
- A.F. – Acture fide, Auli filius.
- AG. – Ager, Ago, Agrippa.
- A.G. – Agens gratias, Amico grato, Animo grato, Anno gratiae, Aulus Gellius.
- A.L.AE., A.L.E. – Arbitrium litis aestimandae.
- A.M., A.MILL. – Ad milliarium. Ante meridiem.
- AN. – Aniensis, Annus, Ante.
- ANN. – Annales, Anni, Annona.
- ANT. – Ante, Antonius.
- A.O. – Alii omnes, Amico optimo.
- AP. – Appius, Apud.
- A.P. – Ad pedes, Aedilitia potestate.
- A.P.F. – Auro (or argento) publico feriundo.
- A.P.M. – Amico posuit monumentum, Annorum plus minus.
- A.P.R.C. – Anno post Romam conditam.
- ARG. – Argentum.
- AR.V.V.D.D. – Aram votam volens dedicavit, Arma votiva dono dedit.
- AT, A TE., A TER. – A tergo.
- A.T.M.D.O. – Aio te mihi dare oportere.
- AV. – Augur, Augustus, Aurelius.
- A.V. – Annos vixit.
- A.V.C. – Ab urbe condita.
- AVG. – Augur, Augustus.
- AVGG. – Augusti duo
- AVGGG. – Augusti tres.
- AVT.PR.R. – Auctoritas provinciae Romanorum.
- A. – Absolvo, Aedilis, Aes, Ager, Ago, Aio, Amicus, Annus, Antiquo, Auctor, Auditor, Augustus, Aulus, Aurum, Aut.
- AA. – Augusti.
- AAA., AAAGGG – Augusti tres.
- A.A.A.F.F. – Auro argento acre flando feriundo.
- A.B. – Artium Baccalaureus ("Bachelor of Arts")
- Ab. – Abbas ("Abbot")
- Abp. – Archbishop
- Abs. – Absens ("Absent")
- Absoluo. – Absolutio ("Absolution")
- ABB. – Abbas
- A.B.M. – Amico bene merenti
- A.C. – Auditor Cameræ (Auditor of the Papal Treasury)
- AC – Ante Christum ("Before Christ")
- ACN – Ante Christum Natum ("Before the Birth of Christ")
- A.D. – Anno Domini ("Year of Our Lord")
- a.d. – ante diem ("The day before")
- A.C. – Acta causa, Alins civis.
- A.D. – A domino, Anno Domini, Ante diem
- AED. – Aedilis
- AEDILIC. – Aedilicia potestate, Aedilicius
- AED CVR – Aedilis curulis
- AEL. – Aelius
- AEPP. – Archiepiscopus
- Alr. – Aliter ("Otherwise")
- A.M., A.MILL. – Ad milliarium.
- AP. – Appius, Apud.
- A.P.F. – Auro (sive argento) publico feriundo.
- A.P.M. – Amico posuit monumentum, Annorum plus minus.
- Applica. – Apostolica ("Apostolic")
- Appatis. – Approbatis ("Having been approved")
- Archiepus. – Archiepiscopus ("Archbishop")
- Aucte. – Auctoritate ("By the Authority")
- AVG. – Augur, Augustus, Augustus mensis.
- AVGG. – Augusti
- AVR. – Aurelius
- AVSPP – Auspicia
- Adm. Rev. – Admodum Reverendus ("Very Reverend")
- Adv. – Adventus ("Advent")
- Alb. – Albus ("White" — Breviary)
- al. – alii, alibi, alias ("others", "elsewhere", "otherwise")
- A.M. – Anno Mundi ("Year of the World")
- A.M. – Artium Magister ("Master of Arts")
- A.M.D.G. – Ad Majorem Dei Gloriam ("For the greater glory of God")
- An. – Annus ("Year")
- Ann. – Anni ("Years")
- Ana – Antiphona
- Ant. – Antiphona
- Apost. – Apostolus ("Apostle")
- Ap. Sed. – Apostolica Sedes ("Apostolic See")
- Ap. Sed. Leg. – Apostolicæ Sedis Legatus ("Legate of the Apostolic See")
- Archiep. – Archiepiscopus ("Archbishop")
- Archid. – Archidiaconus ("Archdeacon")
- Archiprb. – Archipresbyter ("Archpriest")
- A.R.S. – Anno Reparatæ Salutis ("In the year of Our Redemption")
- A.U. – Alma Urbs ("Beloved City" — i.e., Rome)
- Authen. – Authentica ("Authentic" — e.g. letters)
- Aux. – Auxilium, Auxilio ("Help", "With the help of")
- A.D. – Ante Diem (e.g. in the phrase, "Ante Diem VI [or Sextum] Kal. Apriles", is equivalent to the sixth day before the Calends of April, counting both the Calends and the day intended to be indicated); or Anima Dulcis ("Sweet Soul")
- A.Q.I.C. – Anima Quiescat In Christo ("May his [or her] Soul Repose in Christ")

== B ==
- B. – Balbius, Balbus, Beatus, Bene, Beneficiarius, Beneficium, Bonus, Brutus, Bustum.
- B. (for V.) – Berna Bivus, Bixit.
- B.A. – Bixit anos, Bonis auguriis, Bonus amabilis.
- BB., B.B. – Bene bene, i.e. optime, Optimus.
- B.D. – Bonae deae, Bonum datum.
- B.DD. – Bonis deabus.
- B.D.S.M. – Bene de se merenti.
- B.F. – Bona femina, Bona fides, Bona fortuna, Bonum factum.
- B.F. – Bona femina, Bona filia.
- B.H. – Bona hereditaria, Bonorum heres.
- B.I. – Bonum judicium.
- B.I.I. – Boni judicis judicium.
- B.M. – Beatae memoriae, Bene merenti.
- B.N. – Bona nostra, Bonum nomen.
- BN.H.I. – Bona hic invenies.
- B.P. – Bona paterna, Bonorum potestas, Bonum publicum.
- B.Q. – Bene quiescat, Bona quaesita.
- B.RP.N. – Boho reipublicae natus.
- BRT. – Britannicus.
- B.T. – Bonorum tutor, Brevi tempore.
- B.V. – Bene vale, Bene vixit, Bonus vir.
- B.V.V. – Balnea vina Venus.
- BX. – Bixit (for vixit).
- B. – Balbius, Balbus, Beatus, Bene, Beneficiarius, Beneficium, Bonus, Brutus, Bustum.
- B. (in loco V.) – Berna Bivus, Bixit.
- B.A. – Bixit annos [recte Vixit annos], Bonis auguriis, Bonus amabilis.
- BB., B.B. – Bene bene, i.e. optime, Optimus.
- B.D. – Bonae deae, Bonum datum.
- B.DD. – Bonis deabus.
- B.D.S.M. – Bene de se merenti.
- B.F. – Bona femina, Bona fides, Bona fortuna, Bonum factum.
- B.F. – Bona femina, Bona filia.
- B.H. – Bona hereditaria, Bonorum heres.
- B.I. – Bonum iudicium.
- B.I.I. – Boni iudicis iudicium.
- B.M. – Beatae memoriae, Bene merenti.
- B.M.V. – Beatae Mariae virginis
- B.N. – Bona nostra, Bonum nomen.
- BN.H.I. – Bona hic invenies.
- B.P. – Bona paterna, Bonorum potestas, Bonum publicum.
- B.Q. – Bene quiescat, Bona quaesita.
- B.RP.N. – Boho reipublicae natus.
- BRT. – Britannicus.
- B.T. – Bonorum tutor, Brevi tempore.
- B.V. – Bene vale, Bene vixit, Bonus vir.
- B.V.V. – Balnea vina Venus.
- BX. – Bixit [recte vixit].
- B. – Bene Merenti
- BMT. – Bene Merenti ("To the Well-Deserving")
- B.M. – Bonae Memoriæ ("Of Happy Memory")
- B.F. – Bonae Feminæ ("To the Good Woman")
- B.I.C. – Bibas [for Vivas] In Christo ("May you Live In Christ")
- B.M.F. – Bene Merenti Fecit ("He erected this to the Well-Deserving")
- B.Q. – Bene Quiescat ("May he [or she] Rest Well")
- B.A. – Baccalaureus Artium ("Bachelor of Arts")
- B. BB. – Beatus, Beati ("Blessed")
- B.C. – Before Christ
- B.C.L. – Baccalaureus Civilis [or Canonicae] Legis ("Bachelor of Civil [or Canon] Law")
- B.D. – Bachelor of Divinity
- B.F. – Bona Fide ("In Good Faith")
- Ben. – Benedictio ("Blessing")
- Benevol. – Benevolentia ("Benevolence")
- Bon. Mem. – Bonæ Memoriæ ("Of Happy Memory")
- B.P. – Beatissime Pater ("Most Holy Father")
- Bro. – Brother
- B. Se. – Baccalaureus Scientiarum ("Bachelor of Sciences")
- B.U.J. – Baccalaureus Utriusque Juris ("Bachelor of Both Laws" — i.e., civil and canon)
- B.T. – Baccalaureus Theologiæ ("Bachelor of Theology")
- B.V. – Beatitudo Vestra ("Your Holiness")
- B.V. – Beata Virgo ("Blessed Virgin")
- B.V.M. – Beata Virgo Maria ("Blessed Virgin Mary")

== C ==
- C. – Caesar, Cains, Caput, Causa, Censor, Civis, Conors, Colonia Comitialis (dies), Condemno, Consul, Cum, Curo, Custos, Caia, Centuria, Cum, Con. (prefix).
- C.B. – Civis bonus, Commune bonum, Conjugi benemerenti, Cui bono.
- C.C. – Calumniae causa, Causa cognita, Conjugi carissimae, Consilium cepit, Curiae consulto.
- C.C.C. – Calumniae cavendae causa.
- C.C.F. – Caesar (or Caius) curavit faciendum, Caius Caii filius.
- CC.VV. – Clarissimi viri. (=senators)
- C.D. – Caesaris decreto, Cains Decius, Comitialibus diebus.
- CES. – Censor, Censores.
- CESS. – Censores.
- C.F. – Causa fiduciae, Conjugi fecit, Curavit faciendum.
- C.H. – Custos heredum, Custos hortorum.
- C.I. – Caius Julius, Consul jussit, Curavit judex.
- CL. – Clarissimus, Claudius, Clodius, Colonia.
- CL.V. – Clarissimus vir, Clypeum vovit.
- C.M. – Caius Marius, Causa mortis.
- CN. – Cnaeus.
- COH. – Coheres, Conors.
- COL. – Collega, Collegium, Colonia, Columna.
- COLL. – Collega, Coloni, Coloniae.
- COM. – Comes, Comitium, Comparatum.
- CON. – Conjux, Consensus, Consiliarius, Consul, Consularis.
- COR. – Cornelia (tribus), Cornelius, Corona, Corpus.
- COS. – Consiliarius, Consul, Consulares.
- COSS. – Consules.
- C.P. – Carissimus (or Clarissimus) puer, Civis publicus, Curavit ponendum.
- C.R. – Caius Rufus, Cīvis Rōmānus, Curavit reficiendum.
- CS. – Caesar, Communis, Consul.
- C.V. – Clarissimus (or Consularis) vir.
- CVR. – Cura, Curator, Curavit, Curia.
- C. – Caesar, Caius, Caput, Carrissimus, Causa, Censor, Centurio, Civis, Cohors, Colonia Comitialis (dies), Condemno, Coniunx, Comes, Consul, Cum, Curavit, Curo, Custos, Caia, Centuria, Cum, Con. (praeverbium).
- c. – circa
- CAL. – Calendis
- C.B. – Civis bonus, Commune bonum, Coniugi benemerenti, Cui bono.
- C.C. – Calumniae causa, Causa cognita, Coniugi carissimae, Consilium cepit, Curiae consulto.
- C.C.C. – Calumniae cavendae causa.
- C.C.F. – Caesar (vel Caius) curavit faciendum, Caius Caii filius.
- CC.VV. – Clarissimi viri.
- C.D. – Caesaris decreto, Cains Decius, Comitialibus diebus.
- CES. – Censor, Censores.
- CESS. – Censores.
- C.F. – Causa fiduciae, Coniugi fecit, Curavit faciendum.
- C.H. – Custos heredum, Custos hortorum.
- C.I. – Caius Iulius, Consul iussit, Curavit iudex.
- CL. – Clarissimus, Claudius, Clodius, Colonia.
- CL.V. – Clarissimus vir, Clypeum vovit.
- C.M. – Caius Marius, Causa mortis.
- CN. – Cnaeus.
- COH. – Coheres, Conors.
- COL. – Collega, Collegium, Colonia, Columna.
- COLL. – Collega, Coloni, Coloniae.
- COM. – Comes, Comitium, Comparatum.
- CON. – Coniunx, Consensus, Consiliarius, Consul, Consularis.
- COR. – Cornelia (tribus), Cornelius, Corona, Corpus.
- COS. – Consiliarius, Consul, Consulares.
- COSS. – Consules.
- C.P. – Carissimus (sive Clarissimus) puer, Civis publicus, Curavit ponendum.
- C.R. – Caius Rufus, Cīvis Rōmānus, Curavit reficiendum.
- CS. – Caesar, Communis, Consul.
- C.V. – Clarissimus (sive Consularis) vir.
- CVR. – Cura, Curator, Curavit, Curia.
- Cam. – Camera (Papal Treasury)
- Cam. Ap. – Camera Apostolica ("Apostolic Camera" — i.e. Papal Treasury)
- Can. – Canonicus
- Canc. – Cancellarius ("Chancellor")
- Cap. – Capitulum ("Little Chapter" — Breviary)
- Cap. de seq. – Capitulum de Sequenti ("Little chapter of the following feast" — Breviary)
- Capel. – Capella ("Chapel")
- Caus. – Causa ("Cause")
- C.C. – Curatus ("Curate" — used chiefly in Ireland)
- CC. VV. – Clarissimi Viri ("Illustrious Men")
- Cen. Eccl. – Censura Ecclesiastica ("Ecclesiastical Censure")
- Cla. – Clausula ("Clause")
- Cl. – Clericus
- Clico. – Clericus, Clerico ("Cleric")
- Clun. – Cluniacenses ("Monks of Cluny")
- C.M. – Causa Mortis ("On occasion of death")
- Cod. – Codex (Manuscript)
- Cog. Leg. – Cognatio Legalis ("Legal Cognation")
- Cog. Spir. – Cognatio Spiritualis ("Spiritual Cognation")
- Coll. Cone. – Collectio Conciliorum ("Collection of the Councils")
- Comm. Prec. – Commemoratio Praecedentis ("Commemoration of the preceding feast" — Breviary)
- Comm. Seq. – Commemoratio Sequentis ("Commemoration of the following feast" — Breviary)
- Compl. – Completorium ("Compline" — Breviary)
- Con. – Contra ("against")
- Cone. – Concilium ("Council")
- Conf. – Confessor
- Conf. Doct. – Confessor et Doctor (Breviary)
- Conf. Pont. – Confessor Pontifex ("Confessor and Bishop" — Breviary)
- Cons. – Consecratio ("Consecration")
- Consecr. – Consecratus ("Consecrated")
- Const. Ap. – Constitutio Apostolica ("Apostolic Constitution")
- Cr. – Credo ("Creed" — Breviary)
- Canice. – Canonice ("Canonically")
- Card. – Cardinalis ("Cardinal")
- Cens. – Censuris ("Censures" — abl. or dat. case)
- Circumpeone. – Circumspectione ("Circumspection" — abl. case)
- Coione. – Communione ("Communion" — abl. case)
- Confeone. – Confessione ("Confession" — abl. case)
- Consciae. – Conscientiæ ("Of [or to] conscience")
- Constbus – Constitutionibus ("Constitutions" — abl. or dat. Case)
- C. – Consul
- CC. – Consules ("Consuls")
- C.F. – Clarissima Femina ("Most Illustrious Woman")
- Cl. V. – Clarissimus Vir ("Most Illustrious Man")
- C.O. – Conjugi Optimo ("To my Excellent Husband")
- C.O.B.Q. – Cum Omnibus Bonis Quiescat ("May he [or she] Repose With All Good souls")
- COI. – Conjugi ("To my Husband [or Wife]")
- CS. – Consul
- COS. – Consul
- COSS. – Consules ("Consuls")
- C.P. – Clarissima Puella ("Most Illustrious Maiden")

== D ==
- D. – Dat, Dedit, De, Decimus, Decius, Decretum, Decurio, Deus, Dicit, Dies, Divus, Dominus, Domus, Donum, Depositus ("Laid to rest"), Dulcis ("Dear One"), Dedit, Dedicavit ("Gave", "Dedicated")
- d. Decessit ("he/she died")
  - d.s.p. : Decessit sine prole, “died without issue.”
  - d.s.p.l.: Decessit sine prole legitima, “died without legitimate issue.”
  - d.s.p.m.: Decessit sine prole mascula, “died without male issue”.
  - d.s.p.m.l.: Decessit sine prole mascula legitima, “died without legitimate male issue”.
  - d.s.p.m.s.: Decessit sine prole mascula superstite, “died without surviving male issue”.
  - d.v.m. : Decessit vita matris, “Died during the lifetime of the mother”. Used when an heir or heiress predeceases their mother. This is used in cases of inheritance through the mother's line rather than that of the father.
  - d.v.p. : Decessit vita patris, “Died during the lifetime of the father.” Used when the heir predeceases their father, the current holder of an honor or title.
- d. – dies ("day")
- D.C. – Decurio coloniae, Diebus comitialibus, Divus Caesar.
- D.C.L. – Doctor Civilis [or Canonicae] Legis ("Doctor of Civil [or Canon] Law")
- D.D. – Dea Dia, Decurionum decreto, Dedicavit, Deo dedit, Dono dedit, Domus Divina,, Doctor Divinitatis ("Doctor of Divinity" — i.e. Theology), Doctores ("Doctors")
- D.D.D. – Datum decreto decurionum, Dono dedit dedicavit, Deo Donum Dedit
- D.D.L.M. – Donum dedit libens merito.
- D.E.R. – De ea re.
- D.G. – Dei Gratia ("By the Grace of God")
- D.I. – Dedit imperator, Diis immortalibus, Diis inferis.
- D.I.P. – Dormit In Pace ("Sleeps in Peace")
- D.l.M. – Deo invicto Mithrae, Diis inferis Manibus.
- D.M. – Deo Magno, Dignus memoria, Di(i)s Manibus ("To the Manes/spirits of the departed"), Dolo malo.
- D.M.P.S. – Dis Manibus (et) perpetuae securitati
- D.M.S. – Diis Manibus Sacrum ("Sacred to the Manes [of]")
- D.N. – Domino Nostro ("To Our Lord"), Dominus Noster ("Our Lord")
- D.N.I.C. – Domini nostri Iesu Christi
- D.N.J.C. – Dominus Noster Jesus Christus ("Our Lord Jesus Christ")
- D.O.M. – Deo Optimo Maximo ("To God, the Best and Greatest")
- D.O.M.A. – Deo Optimo maximo aeterno
- D.P.S. – Dedit proprio sumptu, Deo perpetuo sacrum, De pecunia sua.
- D.R. – Decanus Ruralis ("Rural Dean")
- D.S.I.M. – Deo Soli Invicto Mithrae
- D.S.P. – De sua pecunia.
- D.Se. – Doctor Scientiarum ("Doctor of Sciences")
- D.V. – Deo Volente ("God willing")
- DD. NN. – Dominis Nostris ("To Our Lords")
- DD. – Divi
- Dec. – Decanus ("Dean")
- DEC. – Decurio
- Def. – Defunctus ("Deceased")
- DEP. – Depositus ("Laid to rest")
- DES. – Designatus.
- DEV – Devotus
- Discreoni. – Discretioni ("To the Discretion")
- Dispensao. – Dispensatio ("Dispensation")
- DN – Dominus
- Dni. – Domini
- DNO. – Domino
- DNS – Dominus ("Lord", "Sir", or "Mr.")
- Dnus – Dominus
- DNUS – Dominus
- Doct. – Doctor (Breviary)
- Dom. – Dominica ("Sunday")
- Doxol. – Doxologia ("Doxology" — Breviary)
- Dr. iur. – Doctor iuris
- DS – Deus ("God")
- Dupl. I. Cl. – Duplex Primæ Classis ("Double First Class feast" — Breviary)
- Dupl. II. Cl. – Duplex Secundae Classis ("Double Second Class feast" — Breviary)
- Dupl. Maj. – Duplex Major ("Double Major feast")
- Dupl. – Duplex ("Double feast" — Breviary)

== E ==
- E. – Ecclesia, Ejus, Eius, Eques, Erexft, Ergo, Est, Et, Earvin, Etiam, Evangelista, Ex.
- EG. – Aeger, Egit, Egregius.
- E.G. – exempli gratia (e.g.) (for the sake of example)
- E.H.L.N.R. – eius hac lege nihil(um) rogatur
- EQ.M. – Equitum magister.
- EL. – Electus
- E.M. – Egregiae memoriae, Eiusmodi, Ejusmodi, Erexit monumentum.
- EPI. – Episcopi
- EPO. – Episcopo
- EQ. – Eques
- EQ.M. – Equitum magister.
- E.Q.R. – Eques Romanus.
- E.P. – Equo publico.
- E.R.A. – Ea res agitur.
- E(X)T. – Ex testamento
- E(X)V. – Ex voto
- Eccl. – Ecclesiasticus ("Ecclesiastic")
- Eccl. – Ecclesia ("The Church")
- El. – Electio, Electus ("Election", "Elect")
- Emus – Eminentissimus ("Most Eminent")
- EPS – Episcopus
- EP. – Episcopus
- Episc. – Episcopus ("Bishop")
- Et. – Etiam ("Also, Even")
- Evang. – Evangelium ("Gospel" — Breviary)
- Ex. – Extra ("Outside of")
- Exe. – Excommunicatus, Excommunicatio ("Excommunicated, Excommunication")
- Ecclae. – Ecclesiæ ("Of [or to] the Church")
- Ecclis. – Ecclesiasticis ("Ecclesiastical")
- Effum. – Effectum ("Effect")
- Epus. – Episcopus ("Bishop")
- Excoe. – Excommunicatione ("Excommunication" — abl. case)
- Exit. – Existit ("Exists")
- E.V. – Ex Voto ("In Fulfilment of a Vow")
- EX. TM. – Ex Testamento ("In accordance with the Testament of")
- E VIV. DISC. – E Vivis Discessit ("Departed from Life")

== F ==
- F. – Fabius, Facere, Fecit, &c., Familia, Fastus (dies), Felix, Feliciter, Femina, Fides, Filius, Flamen, Fortuna, Frater, Fuit, Functus.
- F.C. – Faciendum curavit, Fidei commissume, Fiduciae causa, Fieri Curavit ("Caused to be made")
- F.D. – Fidem dedit, Flamen Dialis, Fraude donavit.
- F.F. – Fieri fecit ("Caused to be made")
- F.F.C. – Filii faciendum curaverunt
- F.F.F. – Ferro flamma fame, Fortior fortuna fato.
- F.L. – Favete linguis, Fecit libens, Felix liber.
- F.R. – Forum Romanum.
- Fel. Mem. – Felicis Memoriæ ("Of Happy Memory")
- Fel. Rec. – Felicis Recordationis ("Of Happy Memory")
- Fer. – Feria ("Weekday")
- FF. – Fratres ("Brothers"); Filii ("Sons")
- FL. – Filius, Flamen, Flaminius, Flavius, floruit.
- FR. – Forum, Fronte, Frumentarius., Frater
- Frum. – Fratrum ("Of the Brothers")
- FS. – Fossor ("Digger")
- FS ET S – Fecit sibi et sui
- Fund. – Fundatio ("Foundation")

== G ==
- G. – Gaius (Caius), Gallia, Gaudium, Gellius, Gemma, Gens, Gesta, Gratia.
- G.F. – Gemina fidelis (legioni).
- G.P.F. – Gemina pia fidelis (legioni).
- GL. – Gloria.
- GN. – Genius, Gens, Genus, Gnaeus (Cnaeus).
- G.P.R. – Genro populi Romani.
- Gen. – Generalis ("General")
- Gl. – Gloria ("Glory to God", etc.)
- Gr. – Gratia ("Grace")
- Grad. – Gradus ("Grade")
- Great. – Gratias ("Thanks"); or Gratis ("Without expense")
- Gnalis – Generalis ("General")
- G.P.R. – Genro populi Romani.

== H ==
- H. – Habet, Heres, Hic, Homo, Honor, Hora.
- HBQ. – Hic Bene Quiescat (Latin: May He Rest Peacefully Here, epigraphy)
- HER. – Heres, Herennius.
- HER., HERC. – Hercules.
- H.L. – Hac lege, Hoc loco, Honesto loco.
- H.M. – Hoc monumentum, Honesta mulier, Hora mala.
- H.S.E. – Hic sepultus est, Hic situs est.
- H.V. – Haec urbs, Hic vivit, Honeste vixit, Honestus vir.
- H. – Habet, Heres, Hic, Homo, Honor, Hora.
- H.B. – Hungaria (et) Bohmia
- HER. – Heres, Herennius.
- HER., HERC. – Hercules.
- H.F.C. – Heres faciendum curavit
- HH. – Heredes
- H.L. – Hac lege, Hoc loco, Honesto loco.
- H.M. – Hoc monumentum, Honesta mulier, Hora mala.
- H.M.P. – Hoc monumentum posuit
- H.S.E. – Hic sepultus est, Hic situs est.
- H.V. – Haec urbs, Hic vivit, Honeste vixit, Honestus vir.
- Humil. – Humiliter ("Humbly")
- Humoi. – Huiusmodi ("Of this kind")
- hebd. – Hebdomada ("Week")
- Hom. – Homilia ("Homily" — Breviary)
- hor. – hora ("hour")
- H. – Haeres ("Heir"); Hic ("Here")
- H.L.S. – Hoc Loco Situs ("Laid [or Put] in This Place")
- H.M.F.F. – Hoc Monumentum Fieri Fecit ("Caused This Monument to be Made")
- H.S. – Hic Situs ("Laid Here")

== I ==
- I. – Immortalis, Imperator, In, Infra, Inter, Invictus, Ipse, Isis, Judex, Julius, Junius, Jupiter, Justus.
- IA. – Jam, Intra.
- I.C. – Julius Caesar, Juris Consultum, Jus civile.
- ID. – Idem, Idus, Interdum.
- l.D. – Inferis diis, Jovi dedicatnm, Jus dicendum, Jussu Dei.
- I.D.M. – Jovi deo magno.
- I.E. – Id est.
- I.F. – In foro, In fronte.
- I.H. – Jacet hic, In honestatem, Justus homo.
- IM. – Imago, Immortalis, Immunis, Impensa.
- IMP. – Imperator, Imperium.
- I.N.R.I. – Iesus Nazarenus Rex Iudaeorum.
- I.O.M. – Jovi optimo maximo.
- I.P. – In publico, Intra provinciam, Justa persona.
- I.S.V.P. – Impensa sua vivus posuit.
- I. – Immortalis, Imperator, In, Infra, Inter, Invictus, Ipse, Isis, Iudex, Iulius, Iunius, Iupiter, Iustus.
- IA. – Iam, Intra.
- I.C. – Iulius Caesar, Iuris Consultum, Ius civile.
- ICTVS – Iuris consultus
- ID. – Idem, Idus, Interdum.
- l.D. – Inferis diis, Iovi dedicatnm, Ius dicendum, Iussu Dei.
- I.D.M. – Iovi deo magno.
- I.F. – In foro, In fronte.
- I.H. – Iacet hic, In honestatem, Iustus homo.
- II VIR I D – Duovir/Duumvir iure dicundo.
- IIIIII VIR AVG – Sevir/Sexvir Augustalis.
- ILL. – Illustrissimus
- ILLMA – Illustrissima
- IM. – Imago, Immortalis, Immunis, Impensa.
- IMP. – Imperator, Imperium.
- I.N.R.I. – Iesus Nazarenus Rex Iudaeorum.
- Inst. (Instant, "Current" day, month, year)
  - Inst. a. (instant anno = current year); Inst. MDCCX ("Current Year: 1710")
  - Inst. men. (instant mense = current month)
- I.O.M. – Iovi optimo maximo.
- I.P. – In publico, Intra provinciam, Iusta persona.
- I.S.V.P. – Impensa sua vivus posuit.
- IVL. – Iulius
- IVN. – Iunior
- ID. – Idibus ("On the Ides")
- IDNE. – Indictione ("In the Indiction" — a chronological term)
- I.L.H. – Jus Liberorum Habens ("Possessing the Right of Children" — i.e., eligibility to public office under age)
- INB. – In Bono ("In Good [odour]")
- IND. – Same as IDNE
- INP – In Pace ("In Peace")
- I.X. – In Christo ("In Christ")
- IC – Jesus (first and third letters of His name in Greek)
- Id. – Idus ("Ides")
- Igr. – Igitur ("Therefore")
- Ind. – Indictio ("Indiction")
- Ind. – Index
- Inq. – Inquisitio ("Inquisition")
- i.p.i. – in partibus infidelium ("among the infidels")
- Is. – Idus ("Ides")
- Igr. – Igitur ("Therefore")
- Infraptum. – Infrascriptum ("Written below")
- Intropta. – Introscripta ("Written within")
- Irregulte. – Irregularitate ("Irregularity" — abl. case)

== J ==
- J.C. – Jesus Christus ("Jesus Christ")
- J.C.D. – Juris Canonici Doctor, Juris Civilis Doctor ("Doctor of Canon Law", "Doctor of Civil Law")
- J.D. – Juris Doctor ("Doctor of Law")
- J.M.J. – Jesus, Maria, Joseph ("Jesus, Mary, Joseph")
- Jo. – Johannes
- Joann. – Joannes ("John")
- J.U.D. – Juris Utriusque Doctor ("Doctor of Both Laws" — Civil and Canon)
- Jud. – Judicium ("Judgment")
- J.U.L. – Juris Utriusque Licentiatus ("Licentiate of Both Laws")
- Jur. – Juris ("Of Law")

== K ==
- K. – Kaeso, Caia, Calumnia, Caput, Carus, Castra.
- K., KAL., KL. – Kalendae.
- K. – Kaeso, Caia, Calumnia, Caput, Carus, Castra.
- K., KAL., KL. – Kalendae.
- Kal. – Kalendae ("Calends")
- K. – Kalendas ("Calends"); or Care, Carus, Cara ("Dear One"); or Carissimus[a] ("Dearest")
- K.B.M. – Karissimo Bene Merenti ("To the Most Dear and Well-deserving")

== L ==
- L. – Laelius, Legio, Lex, Libens, Liber, Libra, Locus, Lollius, Lucius, Ludus.
- LB. – Libens, Liberi, Libertus.
- L.C.D. – Legis Civilis Doctor ("Doctor of Civil Law")
- L.D.D.D. – Locus datus decreto decurionum.
- LEG. – Legatus, Legio.
- LEG AVG PR PR – Legatus Augusti pro praetore
- LEG LEG – Legatus legionis
- LIB. – Liber, Liberalitas, Libertas, Libertus, Librarius.
- LIB BAR(O) – Liber baro
- LL. – Leges, Libentissime, Liberti.
- L.L.V.S. – Libens laetus votum solvit.
- L.M. – Libens merito, Locus monumenti.
- L.S. – Laribus sacrum, Libens solvit, Locus sacer, Lectori Salutem.
- LVD. – Ludus.
- LV.P.F. – Ludos publicos fecit.
- Lia. – Licentia ("License")
- Litma. – Legitima ("Lawful")
- Lre. – Litteræ ("Letters")
- Lte. – Licite ("Lawfully", or "licitly")
- Laic. – Laicus ("Layman")
- Laud. – Laudes ("Lauds" — Breviary)
- l.c. – Loco citato
- loc. cit. – Loco citato ("at the place already cited")
- Lect. – Lectio ("Lesson")
- Legit. – Legitime, Legitimus ("Legally", "legitimate")
- L.H.D. – Litterarum Humaniorum Doctor ("Doctor of Literature")
- Lib. – Liber
- Lo. – Liber, Libro ("Book", "In the book")
- Lic. – Licentia, Licentiatus ("License", "Licentiate")
- Litt. – Littera ("Letter")
- LL.B. – Legum Baccalaureus ("Bachelor of Laws")
- LL.D. – Legum Doctor ("Doctor of Laws")
- LL.M. – Legum Magister ("Master of Laws")
- Loc. – Locus ("Place")
- Lov. – Lovanium ("Louvain")
- Lovan. – Lovanienses (Theologians of Louvain)
- L.S. – Loco Sigilli ("Place of the Seal")
- Lud. – Ludovicus

== M ==
- M. – Magister, Magistratus, Magnus, Manes, Marcus, Marins, Marti, Mater, Memoria, Mensis, Miles, Monumentum, Mortuus, Mucius, Mulier.
- M'. – Manius.
- M.D. – Magno Deo, Manibus diis, Matri deum, Merenti dedit.
- MES. – Mensis.
- MESS. – Menses.
- M.F. – Mala fides, Marci filius, Monumentum fecit.
- M.I. – Matri Idaeae, Matii Isidi, Maximo Jovi.
- MNT., MON. – Moneta.
- M.P. – Male positus, Monumentum posuit.
- M.S. – Manibus sacrum, Memoriae sacrum, Manu scriptum.
- MVN. – Municeps, municipium (also MN., MV. and MVNIC.)
- M.V.S. – Marti ultori sacrum, Merito votum solvit.
- M. – Magister, Magistratus, Magnus, Manes, Marcus, Marins, Marti, Mater, Memoria, Mensis, Miles, Monumentum, Mortuus, Mucius, Mulier.
- M'. – Manius.
- M.D. – Magno Deo, Manibus diis, Matri deum, Merenti dedit.
- MEN – Mensis
- MES. – Mensis.
- MESS. – Menses.
- M.F. – Mala fides, Marci filius, Monumentum fecit.
- M.I. – Matri Idaeae, Matii Isidi, Maximo Iovi.
- MIL – Miles.
- M L – Monumentum legavit.
- MNT. – Moneta.
- MON – Moneta, Monumentum.
- M.P. – Male positus, Monumentum posuit.
- M.S. – Manibus sacrum, Memoriae sacrum, Manu scriptum.
- MVN. – Municeps, municipium (MN., MV. et MVNIC. quoque)
- M.V.S. – Marti ultori sacrum, Merito votum solvit.
- M. – Maria ("Mary")
- M.A. – Magister Artium ("Master of Arts")
- Mag. – Magister ("Master")
- Mand. – Mandamus ("We command")
- Mand. Ap. – Mandatum Apostolicum ("Apostolic Mandate", e.g. for a bishop's consecration)
- Mart. – Martyr
- M. – Martyr
- MM. – Martyr, Martyres ("Martyr", "Martyrs" — Breviary)
- Mat. – Matutinum ("Matins" — Breviary)
- Matr. – Matrimonum ("Marriage")
- Mgr. – Monseigneur, Monsignore ("My Lord")
- Miss. – Missa ("Mass" — Breviary); Missionarius ("Missionary")
- Miss. Apost. – Missionarius Apostolicus
- M.A. – Missionarius Apostolicus ("Missionary Apostolic")
- M.R. – Missionarius Rector ("Missionary Rector")
- m.t.v. – mutatur terminatio versiculi ("the termination of the little verse is changed" — Breviary)
- Magro. – Magistro ("Master" — dat. or abl. case)
- Mir. – Misericorditer ("Mercifully")
- Miraone. – Miseratione ("Pity" — abl. case)
- Mrimonium. – Matrimonium ("Matrimony")
- M. – Martyr, or Memoria ("Memory") or Monumentum ("Monument")
- MM. – Martyres ("Martyrs")
- M.P. – Monumentum Posuit ("Erected a Monument")
- MRT. – Merenti ("To the Deserving")

== N ==
- N. – Natio, Natus, Nefastus (dies), Nepos, Neptunus, Nero, Nomen, Non, Nonae, Noster, Novus, Numen, Numerius, Numerus, Nummus.
- NB – Nota Bene
- NEP. – Nepos, Neptunus.
- N.F.C. – Nostrae fidei commissum.
- N.L. – Non licet, Non liquet, Non longe.
- N.M.V. – Nobilis memoriae vir.
- NN. – Nostri.
- N.N. – Nomen nescio
- NN., NNO., NNR. – Nostrorum.
- NOB. – Nobilis.
- NOB., NOBR., NOV. – Novembris.
- N.P. – Nefastus primo (priore parto diei), Non potest.
- N. – Natio, Natus, Nefastus (dies), Nepos, Neptunus, Nero, Nomen, Non, Nonae, Noster, Novus, Numen, Numerius, Numerus, Nummus.
- NEP. – Nepos, Neptunus.
- N.F.C. – Nostrae fidei commissum.
- N.L. – Non licet, Non liquet, Non longe.
- N.M.V. – Nobilis memoriae vir.
- NN. – Nostri.
- NN., NNO., NNR. – Nostrorum.
- N.N. – nomen nominandum seu nomen nescio
- NO – Nonis
- NOB. – Nobilis.
- NOB., NOBR., NOV. – Novembris.
- N.P. – Nefastus primo (priore parto diei), Non potest.
- N. – Nonas ("Nones"); or Numero ("Number")
- NN. – Nostris ("To Our" — with a plural) or Numeri ("Numbers")
- Nultus. – Nullatenus ("Nowise")
- Nativ. D.N.J.C. – Nativitas Domini Nostri Jesu Christi ("Nativity of Our Lord Jesus Christ")
- N. D. – Nostra Domina, Notre Dame ("Our Lady")
- Nigr. – Niger ("Black" — Breviary)
- No. – Nobis ("to us", "for us")
- Nob. – Nobilis, Nobiles ("Noble", "Nobles")
- Noct. – Nocturnum ("Nocturn")
- Non. – Nonæ ("Nones")
- Nostr. – Noster, nostri ("Our", "of our")
- Not. – Notitia ("Knowledge")
- N.S. – Notre Seigneur, Nostro Signore ("Our Lord")
- N.S. – New Style (The Gregorian calendar date, which has New Year's Day on January 1. It was introduced by the Roman Catholic church in 1582 but Britain, a Protestant nation, did not adopt it until 1752.)
- N.T. – Novum Testamentum ("New Testament")
- Ntri. – Nostri ("Of our")
- Nup. – Nuptiæ ("Nuptials")

== O ==
- O. – Ob, Officium, Omnis, Oportet, Optimus, Opus, Ossa.
- OB. – Obiit, Obiter, Orbis.
- OCist – Ordo Cisterciensis
- O.C.S. – Ob cives servatos.
- OFM – Ordo Fratrum Minorum
- O.H.F. – Omnibus honoribus functus.
- O.H.S.S. – Ossa hic sita sunt.
- O P N – Ora pro nobis.
- OR. – Hora, Ordo, Ornamentum.
- OSA – Ordo Sancti Augustini
- OSB – Ordo Sancti Benedicti
- OT – Ordo Teutonicus
- O.T.B.Q. – Ossa tua bene quiescant.
- OVF – Oro vos faciatis
- Ob. – Obiit ("Died"), from Latin: obitus died, obiit he died.
  - ob. coel. (obiit in coelibatu = died celibate; i.e., died a bachelor or died after taking Holy Orders)
  - ob. inf. (obiit infantia = died in infancy)
  - ob. inf. set. (died as minor)
  - ob. inn. (obiit innupta = died a spinster)
  - ob. juv. (obiit juvenis = died in childhood)
  - o.s.p. (obiit sine prole = died without issue; i.e., childless).
  - o.s.p.l. (obiit sine prole legitima = died without legitimate issue).
  - o.s.p.s. (obiit sine prole superstite = died without surviving issue).
  - o.s.p.m. (obiit sine prole mascula = died without male issue).
  - o.s.p.m.l. (obiit sine prole mascula legitima = died without legitimate male issue).
  - o.s.p.m.s. (obiit sine prole mascula superstite = died without surviving male issue).
  - o.v.m. (obiit vita matris = died in the lifetime of their mother; used in the case of a child predeceasing an heiress)
  - o.v.p. (obiit vita patris = died in the lifetime of their father)
- Oct. – Octava ("Octave" — Breviary)
- Omn. – Omnes, Omnibus ("All", "to all")
- Op. Cit. – Opere Citato ("In the work cited")
- Or. – Oratio ("Prayer" — Breviary)
- Ord. – Ordo, Ordinatio, Ordinarius ("Order", "Ordination", "Ordinary")
- Or – Orator
- Orat. – Orator ("Petitioner"), Oratorium ("Oratory")
- O.S. – Old Style (The Julian calendar date. New Year's Day was held on March 25, the Feast of the Annunciation, or “Lady Day”. Although the Roman Catholic church adopted the Gregorian calendar in 1582, England / Britain, a Protestant nation, didn't adopt it until 1752.)
- O.T. – Old Testament
- Oxon. – Oxonium, Oxonienses ("Oxford", "Theologians or Scholars of Oxford")
- Ordinaoni. – Ordinationi ("Ordination" — dat. case)
- Ordio. – Ordinario ("Ordinary" — dat. or abl. case)
- O. – Hora ("Hour"); Obiit ("Died")
- OB. IN XTO. – Obiit In Christo ("Died In Christ")
- OMS. – Omnes ("All")
- OP. – Optimus (Excellent, or Supremely Good)

== P ==
- P. – Pars, Passus, Pater, Patronus, Pax, Perpetuus, Pes, Pius, Plebs, Pondo, Populus, Post, Posuit, Praeses, Praetor, Primus, Pro, Provincia, Publicus, Publius, Puer.
- P.C. – Pactum conventum, Patres conscripti, Pecunia constituta, Ponendum curavit, Post consulatum, Potestate censoria.
- P.F. – Pia fidelis, Pius felix, Promissa fides, Publii filius.
- P.M. – Piae memoriae, Pius minus, Pontifex maximus. Post meridiem.
- P.P. – Pater patratus, Pater patriae, Pecunia publica, Praepositus, Primipilus, Propraetor.
- PR. – Praeses, Praetor, Pridie, Princeps.
- P.R. – Permissu reipublicae, Populus Romanus.
- P.R.C. – Post Romam conditam.
- PR.PR. – Praefectus praetorii, Propraetor.
- P.S. – Pecunia sua, Plebiscitum, Proprio sumptu, Publicae saluti, Post scriptum.
- P.V. – Pia victrix, praefectus urbi, Praestantissimus vir.
- P. – Pars, Passus, Pater, Patronus, Pax, Perpetuus, Pes, Pius, Plebs, Pondo, Populus, Positum, Post, Posuit, Praeses, Praetor, Primus, Pro, Provincia, Publicus/-e, Publius, Puer.
- P.C. – Pactum conventum, Patres conscripti, Pecunia constituta, Ponendum curavit, Post consulatum, Potestate censoria.
- P.F. – Pia fidelis, Pius felix, Promissa fides, Publii filius.
- P F INV – Pius felix invictus.
- P.M. – Piae memoriae, Pius minus, Pontifex maximus.
- PONT MAX – Pontifex maximus.
- POS – Posuit
- P.P. – Parentes posuerunt, Parentibus pientissimis, Pater patratus, Pater patriae, Patronus posuit, Pecunia publica, Praepositus, Primipilus/Primus pilus, Pro pietate, Propraetor.
- PP – Posuerunt.
- PR. – Praeses, Praetor, Pridie, Princeps.
- PRAEF – Praefectus
- PRAET – Praetor
- P.R. – Permissu reipublicae, Populus Romanus.
- P.R.C. – Post Romam conditam.
- PROC – Procurator
- PRO SAL – Pro salute.
- PR.PR. – Praefectus praetorii, Propraetor.
- P.S. – Pecunia sua, Plebiscitum, Proprio sumptu, Publicae saluti, Post scriptum.
- PS – Psalmus.
- P.V. – Pia victrix, praefectus urbi, Praestantissimus vir.
- P. – Pax ("Peace"); or Pius ("Dutiful"); or Ponendum ("To be Placed"); or Pridie ("The Day Before"); or Plus ("More")
- P.C. – Poni Curavit ("Caused to be Placed")
- P.C. – Post Consulatum
- P. CONS. – Post Consulatum ("After the Consulate")
- P.I. – Poni Jussit ("Ordered to be Placed")
- P.M. – Plus Minus ("More or Less"); or Piae Memoriae ("Of Pious Memory"); or Post Mortem ("After Death")
- PP. – Præpositus ("Placed over")
- PR.K. – Pridie Kalendas ("The Day Before the Calends")
- PRB. – Presbyter ("Priest")
- PR.N. – Pridie Nonas ("The Day Before the Nones")
- P.T.C.S. – Pax Tibi Cum Sanctis ("Peace to Thee With the Saints")
- PZ. – Pie Zeses ("May you Live Piously" — Greek)
- Pbr. – Presbyter ("Priest")
- Penia. – Pœnitentia ("Penance", or "repentance")
- Peniaria. – Pœnitentiaria ("Penitentiary"; i.e. Bureau of the Apostolic Penitentiary)
- Pntium. – Præsentium ("Of those present", or, "Of this present writing")
- Poe. – Posse ("To be able", or, "The ability to do a thing")
- Pontus. – Pontificatus ("Pontificate")
- PP. – Papa ("Pope")
- Pr. – Pater ("Father")
- Pror. – Procurator
- Ptur. – Præfertur ("Is preferred", or, "Is brought forward")
- Ptus. – Præfatus ("Aforesaid")
- P. – Pater, Pere ("Father")
- Pa. – Papa ("Pope"); Pater ("Father")
- Pact. – Pactum ("Agreement")
- Pasch. – Pascha ("Easter" — Breviary)
- Patr. – Patriarcha ("Patriarch")
- Pent. – Pentecostes ("Pentecost" — Breviary)
- Ph.B. – Philosophiæ Baccalaureus ("Bachelor of Philosophy")
- Ph.D. – Philosophiæ Doctor ("Doctor of Philosophy")
- Phil. – Philosophia ("Philosophy")
- Ph.M. – Philosophiæ Magister ("Master of Philosophy")
- P.K. – Pridie Kalendas ("The day before the Calends")
- Poenit. – Poenitentia ("Penance")
- Poenit. Ap. – Pœnitentiaria Apostolica ("Office of the Apostolic Penitentiary")
- Pont. – Pontifex ("Pontiff", i.e. Bishop — Breviary)
- Pont. – Pontificatus ("Pontificate")
- Pont. Max. – Pontifex Maximus ("Supreme Pontiff")
- Poss. – Possessor, Possessio ("Possessor", "Possession")
- PP. – Papa ("Pope"); Pontificum ("Of the popes")
- P.P. – Parochus ("Parish Priest" — used mostly in Ireland)
- PP. AA. – Patres Amplissimi ("Cardinals")
- P.P.P. – Propria Pecunia Posuit ("Erected at his own expense")
- P.R. – Permanens Rector ("Permanent Rector")
- Praef. – Præfatio ("Preface" of the Mass — Breviary)
- Presbit. – Presbyter, Priest
- Prof. – Professus, Professio, Professor ("Professed", "Profession", "Professor")
- Prop. Fid. – Propaganda Fide (Congregation of the Propaganda, Rome)
- Propr. – Proprium ("Proper" — Breviary)
- Prov. – Provisio, Provisum ("Provision", "Provided")
- Ps. – Psalmus ("Psalm")
- Pub. – Publicus
- Publ. – Publicus, Publice ("Public", "Publicly")
- Purg. Can. – Purgatio Canonica ("Canonical Disculpation")

== Q ==
- Q. – Quaestor, Quando, Quantus, Que, Qui, Quinquennalis, Quintus, Quirites.
- Q.B.F.F.F.Q.S. – Quod bonum, faustum, felix fortunatumque sit. (Quod bonum, felix, faustum fortunatumque sit.)
- Q.D.R. – Qua de re.
- Q.I.D. – Quater in die.
- Q.I.S.S. – Quae infra scripta sunt
- QQ. – Quaecunque, Quinquennalis, Quoque.
- Q.Q.V. – Quoquoversus.
- Q.R. – Quaestor reipublicae.
- Q.S.S.S. – Quae supra scripta sunt
- Quadrag. – Quadragesima ("Lent", also the "Fortieth day" before Easter — Breviary)
- Quinquag. – Quinquagesima (The "Fiftieth day" before Easter — Breviary)
- Qd. – Quod ("Because", "That", or, "Which")
- Qmlbt. – Quomodolibet ("In any manner whatsoever")
- Qtnus. – Quatenus ("In so far as")
- Q. – Quiescit
- Qui. – Quiescit ("He Rests")
- Q.B.AN. – Qui Bixit [for Vixit] Annos ("Who lived... years")
- Q.I.P. – Quiescat In Pace ("May he [or she] Rest in Peace")
- Q.V. – Qui Vixit ("Who Lived")

== R ==
- R. – Recte, Res, Res publica, Retro, Rex, Ripa, Roma, Romanus, Rufus, Rursus.
- R.C. – Romana civitas, Romanus civis.
- RESP., RP. – Res publica.
- RET.P., RP. – Retro pedes.
- RIP – Requiescat in pace.
- ROM IMP – Romanorum imperator.
- R.R. – Relationes relatae
- R. – Recte, Res, Respublica, Retro, Rex, Ripa, Roma, Romanus, Rufus, Rursus.
- R.C. – Romana civitas, Romanus civis.
- RESP., RP. – Res publica.
- RET.P., RP. – Retro pedes.
- R. – Requiescit ("He Rests"); or Refrigerio ("In [a place of] Refreshment")
- Reg. – Regionis ("Of the Region")
- Relione. – Religione ("Religion", or, "Religious Order" — abl. case)
- Rlari. – Regulari ("Regular")
- Roma. – Romana ("Roman")
- R. – Responsorium ("Responsory" — Breviary)
- R. – Roma (Rome)
- Rescr. – Rescriptum ("Rescript")
- R.D. – Rural Dean
- Req. – Requiescat ("May he [or she] rest", i.e. in peace)
- Resp. – Responsum ("Reply")
- R.I.P. – Requiescat In Pace ("May he or she rest in peace")
- Rit. – Ritus ("Rite", "Rites")
- Rom. – Romanus, Romana ("Roman")
- R. P. – Reverendus Pater, Reverend Pere ("Reverend Father")
- RR. – Rerum ("Of Things, Subjects" — e.g. SS. RR. Ital., Writers on Italian [historical] subjects); Regesta
- Rt. Rev. – Right Reverend
- Rub. – Ruber ("Red" — Breviary)
- Rubr. – Rubrica ("Rubric")

== S ==
- S. – Sacrum, Sanctus, Sanctissimus, Scriptus, Semis, Senatus, Sepultus, Servius, Servus, Sextus, Sibi, Sine, Situs, Solus, Solvit, Sub, Suus.
- SAC. – Sacerdos, Sacrificium, Sacrum.
- S.C. – Senatus consultum.
- S.D. – Sacrum diis, Salutem dicit, Senatus decreto, Sententiam
- S.D.M. – Sacrum diis Manibus, Sine dolo malo.
- SER. – Servius, Servus.
- S.E.T.L. – Sit ei terra levis.
- SN. – Senatus, Sententia, Sine nomine.
- S.D. – Salutem dicit.
- S.P. – Sacerdos perpetua, Sine pecunia, Sua pecunia.
- S.P.D. – Salutem plurimam dicit.
- S.P.Q.R. – Senatus populusque Romanus.
- S.S. – Sanctissimus senatus, Supra scripture.
- S.T.T.L.-- Sit tibi terra levis.
- S. – Sacerdos, Sacrum, Sanctus, Scriptus, Semis, Senatus, Sepultus, Servius, Servus, Sestertium, Sextus, Sibi, Sine, Situs, Solus, Solvit, Sub, Suus.
- SAC. – Sacerdos, Sacrificium, Sacrum.
- S.C. – Senatus consultum.
- sc., scil. – scilicet
- S.D. – Sacrum diis, Salutem dicit, Senatus decreto, Sententiam
- S.D.M. – Sacrum diis Manibus, Sine dolo malo.
- SER. – Servius, Servus/-a.
- S.E.T.L. – Sit ei terra levis.
- SEX – Sextus.
- SI – Societas Iesu
- SN. – Senatus, Sententia, Sine.
- S.P. – Sacerdos perpetua, Sine pecunia, Spurius, Sua pecunia.
- S.P.D. – Salutem plurimam dicit, ad caput litterarum.
- S.P.Q.R. – Senatus populusque Romanus.
- S. R. E. – Sacra vel Sancta Romana Ecclesia
- S. R. I. (M. P.) – Sacrum Romanum Imperium
- S.S. – Sancti, Sanctissimus, Sanctissimus senatus, Supra scripture.
- SSS – Sanctissimus.
- ST – Sanctus.
- S.T.B.V.E.B.V. – Si Tu Bene Valeas Ego Bene Valeo.
- STIP – Stipendorium.
- STTL – Sit tibi terra levis.
- S.V.B.E.E.Q.V. – Si vales bene est, ego quidem valeo.
- S. – Sacrum
- Sacr. – Sacrum ("Sacred")
- Sab. – Sabbatum
- Sabb. – Sabbatum ("Sabbath", Saturday)
- Saec. – Saeculum (Century)
- Sal. – Salus, Salutis ("Salvation", "of Salvation")
- Salmant. – Salmanticenses (Theologians of Salamanca)
- S.C. – Sacra Congregatio ("Sacred Congregation")
- S.C.C. – Sacra Congregatio Concilii ("Sacred Congregation of the Council", i.e. of Trent)
- S.C.EE.RR. – Sacra Congregatio Episcoporum et Regularium ("Sacred Congregation of Bishops and Regulars")
- S.C.I. – Sacra Congregatio Indicis ("Sacred Congregation of the Index")
- S.C.P.F. – Sacra Congregatio de Propaganda Fide ("Sacred Congregation for the Propagation of the Faith")
- SCS – Sanctus ("Saint")
- s.d. – sine data ("without date of publication")
- S.D. – Servus Dei (Servant of God)
- Semid. – Semiduplex ("Semi" double feast — Breviary)
- Septuag – Septuagesima ("Seventieth day" before Easter; always a Sunday — Breviary)
- Sexag. – Sexagesima ("Sixtieth day" before Easter — Breviary)
- Sig. – Sigillum ("Seal")
- Simpl. – Simplex ("Simple" feast — Breviary)
- Sine Com. – Sine Commemoratione ("Without commemoration" of other feast, or feasts — Breviary)
- s.l. – sine loco ("without place of publication")
- s.l.n.d. – sine loco nec data ("without place or date of publication")
- S.M. – Sanctæ Memoriæ ("Of Holy Memory")
- Soc. – Socius, Socii ("Companion", "Companions" — Breviary)
- S. Off. – Sanctum Officium (Congregation of the Holy Office, Inquisition)
- S.P. – Sanctissime Pater ("Most Holy Father")
- S.P. – Sanctus Petrus
- S. Petr. – Sanctus Petrus ("St. Peter")
- S.P. – Summus Pontifex ("Supreme Pontiff", Pope)
- S.P.A. – Sacrum Palatium Apostolicum ("Sacred Apostolic Palace", Vatican, Quirinal)
- Sr. – Soror (Sister)
- S.R.C. – Sacra Rituum Congregatio ("Sacred Congregation of Rites")
- S.R.E. – Sancta Romana Ecclesia, Sanctæ Romanæ Ecclesia ("Most Holy Roman Church"; or, "of the Most Holy Roman Church")
- SS. – Scriptores ("Writers")
- SS.D.N. – Sanctissimus Dominus Noster ("Our Most Holy Lord [Jesus Christ]", also a title of the Pope)
- S., SS. – Sanctus, Sancti ("Saint", "Saints")
- s.t. – sine typographo ("without printer", "without printer's name")
- S.T.B. – Sacræ Theologiæ Baccalaureus ("Bachelor of Sacred Theology")
- S.T.D. – Sacræ Theologiæ Doctor ("Doctor of Sacred Theology")
- S.T.L. – Sacræ Theologiæ Licentiatus ("Licentiate of Sacred Theology")
- Suffr. – Suffragia ("Suffrages" — i.e. prayers of the saints; Breviary)
- S.V. – Sanctitas Vestra ("Your Holiness")
- Syn. – Synodus ("Synod")
- Salri. – Salutari ("Salutary")
- Snia. – Sententia ("Opinion")
- Sntae. – Sanctæ
- Stae. – Sanctæ ("Holy", or, "Saints" — feminine)
- Spealer. – Specialiter ("Specially")
- Spualibus – Spiritualibus ("In spiritual matters")
- Supplioni. – Supplicationibus ("Supplication" — dat. or abl. case)
- S. – Suus ("His"); or Situs ("Placed"); or Sepulchrum ("Sepulchre")
- SC. M. – Sanctæ Memoriæ ("Of Holy Memory")
- SD. – Sedit ("He sat")
- SSA. – Subscripta ("Subscribed")
- S.I.D. – Spiritus In Deo ("Spirit [rests] in God")
- S.P. – Sepultus ("Buried"); or Sepulchrum ("Sepulchre")
- SS. – Sanctorum (Of the Saints)
- S.V. – Sacra Virgo ("Holy Virgin")

== T ==
- T. – Terminus, Testamentum, Titus, Tribunus, Tu, Turma, Tutor.
- TB., TI., TIB. – Tiberius.
- TB., TR., TRB. – Tribunus.
- T.F. – Testamentum fecit, Titi filius, Titulum fecit, Titus Flavius.
- TM. – Terminus, Testamentum, Thermae.
- T.P. – Terminum posuit, Tribunicia potestate, Tribunus plebis.
- TVL. – Tullius, Tunus.
- T. – Terminus, Testamentum, Titus, Tribunus, Tu, Turma, Tutor.
- TB., TI., TIB. – Tiberius.
- TB., TR., TRB. – Tribunus.
- T.F. – Testamentum fecit, Titi filius, Titulum fecit, Titus Flavius.
- TFI – Testamentum fieri iussit.
- TI(B) – Tiberius
- TM. – Terminus, Testamentum, Thermae.
- TR PL – Tribunus plebis
- TR.POT –Tribunicia potestate, Tribunus plebis.
- T.R.E. – Tempore Regis Eduardi
- TRIB.POT – Tribunicia potestate, Tribunus plebis.
- TVL. – Tullius, Tunus.
- T. – Titulus
- TT. – Titulus, Tituli ("Title", "Titles")
- TM. – Testamentum ("Testament")
- Thia – Theologia
- Theolia. – Theologia ("Theology")
- Tli. – Tituli ("Titles")
- Tm. – Tantum ("So much", or, "Only")
- Tn. – Tamen ("Nevertheless")
- Temp. – Tempus, Tempore ("Time", "in time")
- Test. – Testes, Testimonium ("Witnesses", "Testimony")
- Theol. – Theologia ("Theology")
- Tit. – Titulus, Tituli ("Title", "Titles")

== U ==
- Ult. – Ultimo ("Last" — day, month, year)
  - Ult. a. (ultimo anno = last year)
  - Ult. men. (ultimo mense = last month)
- Usq. – Usque ("As far as")
- Ux. – Uxor ("Wife")

== V ==
- V. – Urbs, Usus, Uxor, Vale, Venerabilis, Verba, Vestalis, Vester, Victrix, Vir, Virgo, Vivus, Volo, Votum.
- V. – Vixit ("He Lived"); or Vixisti ("Thou didst Live")
- V.A. – Veterano assignatus, Vixit annos.
- V.B. – Vir Bonus ("A Good Man")
- V.C. – Vale coniunx, Vir clarissimus, Vir consularis.
- V.E. – Verum etiam, Vir egregius (=equestrian), Visum est.
- V.F. – Usus fructus, Verba fecit, Vicarius Foraneus, Vivus fecit.
- V.G. – Vicarius Generalis ("Vicar-General")
- v. g., v. gr. – Verbi gratia
- V.H. – Vir Honestus ("A Worthy Man")
- V.M. – Vir Magnificus ("Great Man")
- V.P. – Urbis praefectus, Vir perfectissimus, Vivus posuit.
- V.R. – Urbs Roma, Uti rogas, Votum reddidit.
- V.S. – Votum solvit, Vir spectabilis.
- V.S.L.M. – Votum Solvit Libens Merito. (willingly and deservedly fulfilled his vow)
- V.S.L.L.M. – Votum solvit libens laetus merito.
- V.T. – Vetus Testamentum
- V.X. – Vivas, Care [or Cara] ("Mayest thou Live, Dear One"); or Uxor Carissima ("Most Dear Wife")
- Vac. – Vacat, Vacans ("Vacant")
- Val. – Valor ("Value")
- Vat. – Vaticanus ("Vatican")
- Vba. – Verba ("Words")
- Ven. – Venerabilis
- Venebli – Venerabili ("Venerable")
- Vers. – Versiculus ("Versicle" — Breviary)
- Vesp. – Vesperæ ("Vespers" — Breviary)
- Vest. – Vester ("Your")
- Vic. For. – Vicarius Foraneus ("Vicar-Forane")
- Vid. – Vidua ("Widow" — Breviary)
- Vid., Videl. – Videlicet (Namely)
- Vig. – Vigilia ("Vigil" of a feast — Breviary)
- Viol. – Violaceus ("Violet" — Breviary)
- Virg. – Virgo ("Virgin" — Breviary)
- Virid. – Viridis ("Green" — Breviary)
- VIX – Vixit
- VLP – Ulpius
- Vrae. – Vestræ ("Your")
- VV. CC. – Viri Clarissimi ("Most Illustrious Men")
- VV. – Venerabilis, Venerabiles ("Venerable")

== X ==
- XV V. – Quindecimvir.
- X. – Christus
- XPC. – Christus
- XS. – Christus ("Christ")
- XC. – Christus
- XCS. – Christus ("Christ" — first, middle, and last letters of the Greek name)

== Z ==
- ZC, ZE – Et cetera

== Numbers ==
- I – unus
- V – quinque
- X – decem
- L – quinquaginta
- C – centum
- D – quingenti
- M – mille

== See also ==
- List of ecclesiastical abbreviations
- List of Latin abbreviations
- List of medieval abbreviations
- List of Latin phrases
