= Abbreviation (disambiguation) =

An abbreviation is a shortened form of a word or a phrase.

Abbreviation may also refer to:

- Abbreviation (music)
- <abbr/>, an HTML element
- Abbreviations.com, an online dictionary

== See also ==
- Abbreviator, a writer in the Catholic church
