= Tushlaba =

Hebrew acronym

Tushlaba is the Hebrew acronym for תם ונשלם שבח לאל בורא עולם (Abbr. Heb.: תושלב"ע) meaning "Finished and Complete, Praise be to God, Creator of the Universe."

At the end of Jewish works on traditional and religious subjects, it is customary for the author to express thanks to God for enabling the author of the book to complete it satisfactorily. The author's gratitude is expressed in one word, תושלב"ע, printed on the last page of text of the book.

== See also ==
- List of Hebrew acronyms
