= Badei HaShulchan =

Contemporary Jewish legal commentary

The Badei HaShulchan (Hebrew: בדי השלחן, romanized: Poles of the Table) is a multi-volume Halachic commentary on the Shulchan Aruch, authored by Rabbi Shraga Feivel Cohen in Hebrew from 1980 onwards. It is commonly used by rabbis and is sometimes a required text in yeshivahs, especially when studying the Jewish dietary laws (kashrut). Other volumes in the series cover the laws of mourning, tzedakah, vows, ritual immersion and the laws of family purity.

The work consists of three parts running in parallel with the text of the Shulchan Aruch itself, which is reproduced at the top of each page:

1. the primary part of Badei HaShulchan, a summarized clarification of the law in the Shulchan Aruch;
2. supporting citations, or Tziyunim; and
3. extensive notes and elaboration explaining the reasoning behind the Badei HaShulchan, called Biurim (Explanations).
