= Abbreviations.com =

Online abbreviations dictionary

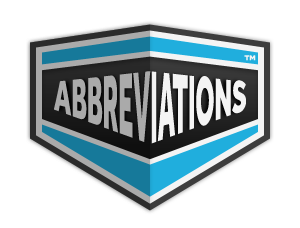
- Website type: Dictionary
- Available in: English
- Creator: STANDS4
- Website: www.abbreviations.com
- Commercial: Yes
- Launched: January 1, 2001; 25 years ago

Abbreviations.com is an online abbreviations dictionary whose domain was first registered in 2001. The company was founded by Yigal Ben Efraim as part of STANDS4 LLC, which also operates Lyrics.com, Grammar.com and Symbols.com among other reference related websites.

As of 2016 the website includes nearly a million definitions that are classified by a large variety of categories from computing and the Web to governmental, military, medicine and more. The database is being built by contributing editors, who can sign up on the website and help expanding it by submitting new entries for inclusion. The website also offers its content to be freely used by third-parties through its open APIs.

== Reception ==
Reference Reviews wrote a review for the site in 2013, stating that it "certainly has its place among the librarians' quick reference websites" but that " the authoritativeness of the site entries is not completely evident. There are no external references available to verify entry reliability. While I would recommend this site to all librarians, it would certainly be a cautionary recommendation." Choice was also critical of the site, writing that "Unfortunately it falls short compared to other online and print sources" and noted that the site had errors, which they attributed to the site seeming to allow user-generated content.

=== Awards and recognition ===
In 2005 the website has been selected as one of the "101 Best Web Sites for Writers" by the American magazine Writer's Digest.

In 2010 the Abbreviations.com website has been selected as one of the "Best Free Reference Web Sites" by the ALA's Reference and User Services Association.

In 2015 the website's parent company STANDS4 has won the Red Herring Top 100 Europe award.
